= Adult Residential Colleges Association =

Group of residential colleges in the United Kingdom

The Adult Residential Colleges Association (ARCA) was a group of 27 residential colleges in the United Kingdom. The association was based in Felixstowe, Suffolk, England.

ARCA colleges specialized in short-stay residential adult education courses for the general public. Many were run by local authorities, whilst others were operated by charitable trusts or similar organizations.

Each college published its own programme of weekend, midweek and day courses, summer schools and courses leading to recognized qualifications. Most were offered just for the enjoyment of learning rather than for formal credit. Academic qualifications were not required of those who enrolled.

== Associated colleges ==
- Anglia Leisure Learning in Suffolk
- Alston Hall in Longridge, Lancashire
- Belstead House in Ipswich, Suffolk
- Benslow Music Trust in Hitchin, Hertfordshire
- Braziers Park in Wallingford, Oxfordshire
- Burton Manor in Burton, Cheshire
- Debden House in Loughton, Essex
- Denman College in Marcham, Oxfordshire
- Dillington House in Whitelackington, Somerset
- Farncombe Estate Centre in Broadway, Worcestershire
- Hawkwood College in Stroud, Gloucestershire
- Higham Hall in Cockermouth, Cumbria
- Knuston Hall in Irchester, Northamptonshire
- Lancashire College in Chorley, Lancashire
- Missenden Abbey in Great Missenden, Buckinghamshire
- Plas Tan y Bwlch in Blaenau Ffestiniog, Gwynedd
- Wedgwood Memorial College in Barlaston, Staffordshire
- West Dean College in West Dean, West Sussex
- Westhope Craft College in Craven Arms, Shropshire
