= Listed buildings in Burton (near Neston) =

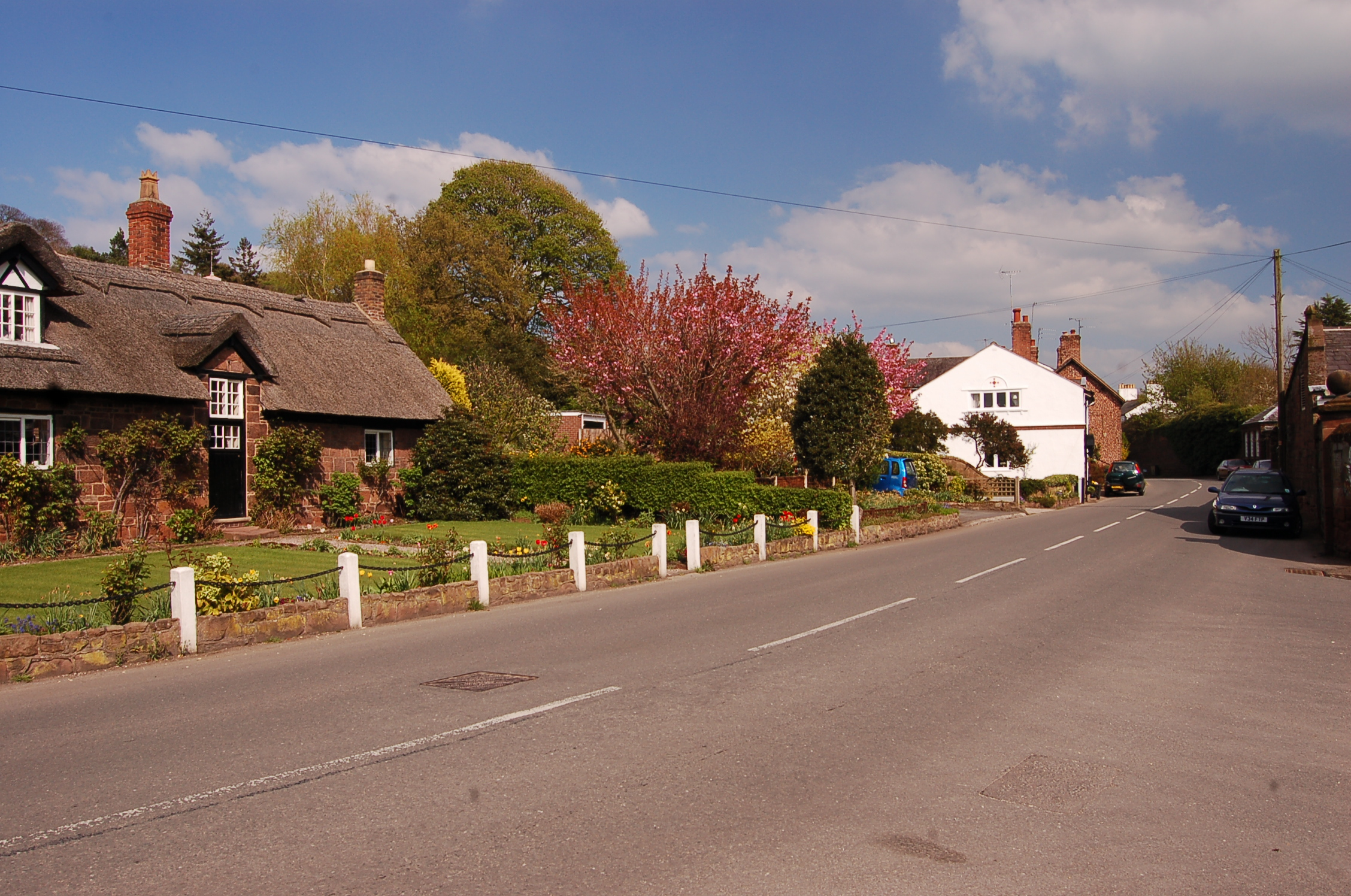
Village Street, Burton, with Bishop Wilson's House on the left

Burton is an unparished district in the Wirral Peninsula, Cheshire West and Chester, England. It contains 33 buildings that are recorded in the National Heritage List for England as designated listed buildings. The district contains the village of Burton and surrounding farmland and marsh. Most of the listed buildings are houses and cottages in the village, and many of these date from the 17th century, although most have been altered or extended. Only one of the buildings is listed at Grade II*, the middle of the three grades; this is St Nicholas' Church. All the other buildings are listed at Grade II, the lowest grade. The major house in the village is Burton Manor, which was later converted into an adult education college, although this closed in 2011. There are separate listed structures associated with the church and the manor. The other buildings include farmhouses and farm buildings, a former school and schoolmaster's cottage, the ruins of a windmill, a peace memorial, and a telephone kiosk.

== Key ==
Grade	Criteria
II*	Particularly important buildings of more than special interest.
II	Buildings of national importance and special interest.

== Buildings ==
Name and location	Photograph	Date	Notes	Grade
Barn End; 53.2605°N 3.0279°W		17th century (or earlier)	Originating as two cottages, the building has been altered and converted into one house. It is built partly in timber framing with brick nogging and crucks, and partly in sandstone, all of which is rendered. The house stands on an outcrop of sandstone, and is approached by ten steps. Its roof is thatched. The house is in a single storey and extends for five bays. The windows are horizontal sliding sashes.	II
Bishop Wilson's House; 53.2605°N 3.0295°W		Early 17th century	This originated as a cottage, dairy and cheese room; it was altered in the 19th and 20th centuries and is used as a house with an outbuilding. It is built in sandstone. The house has a thatched roof, and the roof of the outbuilding is slated. The house is in a single storey with an attic and has a four-bay front. Above the entrance is a gabled half-dormer, and the attic window is a dormer. Inside the house are the remains of three crucks. The house was the birthplace of Bishop Wilson.	II
Barn Farmhouse and outbuildings 53.2557°N 3.0229°W	—	17th century	The farmhouse and outbuildings are in stone and brick with slate roofs, the front of the farmhouse being stuccoed. The farmhouse is in two storeys with a two-bay front on a stone plinth and the outbuildings are in a single storey with a loft. The windows are a mix of sashes and casements.	II
Burton Point Farmhouse; 53.2597°N 3.0435°W	—	17th century	There have been alterations and additions, and the farmhouse is used as a house. It is built in sandstone with some rendering, and has a slate roof with stone copings and ridges. The house is in two storeys and has two bays. The windows are later casements.	II
Church Cottage; 53.2613°N 3.0243°W		17th century	Originally two cottages, this has been converted into a single dwelling. It is built in sandstone and brick with a slate roof. The house is in two storeys and has a five-bay front, with the left (brick) part standing on a stone plinth. The windows are casements.	II
Elm Farmhouse; 53.2606°N 3.0256°W		17th century	The farmhouse was remodelled in the 19th century and extended in the 20th century, and is used as a private house. It is built in stone and brick on a stone plinth and has a slate roof. The house is in two storeys with an attic, and has a three-bay front with an added bay to the right. The windows are casements. Inside the house is an inglenook.	II
Farm building, Village Street; 53.2607°N 3.0268°W		17th century	The farm building has subsequently been altered. It is in sandstone with a slate roof. The building has one storey and a loft and extends for two bays. Its features include two large circular pitch holes.	II
Greenwood; 53.2603°N 3.0298°W		17th century	This originated as a house and a farm building, and was later combined into a single dwelling. It was damaged by fire in the 20th century. The building is timber-framed and encased in brick, and has a red tiled roof. It has an L-shaped plan, is in a single storey, and in two bays. The windows are replacement casements.	II
Plessington Cottage; 53.2610°N 3.0255°W		17th century	The house has been altered and extended. It is built in roughcast brick with a slate roof. The original part is in a single storey with attics and two dormers, and has a three-bay front. The extension to the left has two storeys and a single bay. The windows are replacement casements. The house stands on a sandstone outcrop, and steps lead up to the entrance.	II
Rake Farm Cottage; 53.26034°N 3.02865°W		17th century	The house has been altered, and it was restored in about 1975. It is basically timber-framed on a sandstone plinth, and was later encased in brick. The house is in two storeys and has a two-bay front. In the plinth is a blocked mullioned window. Four steps lead up to the door. The windows are replacement casements.	II
Rose Cottage; 53.26028°N 3.02726°W		17th century	A house that was altered in the 19th and 20th centuries. It is partly timber-framed with brick nogging, and partly in stone. The house has a single storey with an attic and a two-bay front. The left part projects slightly forward and contains a door. The windows are 20th-century casements; those in the attic are in gabled half-dormers.	II
The Croft; 53.26037°N 3.02880°W		17th century	The end cottage in a row of three. It is built in roughcast sandstone with a slate roof and a tile ridge. It is in a single storey with an attic, and has a front with one window and a door. The door is approached by six steps. The windows are replacement casements; that in the attic is in a gabled half-dormer.	II
Church House; 53.2604°N 3.0273°W		Late 17th century	Originating as two cottages, there have been alterations in the 19th and 20th centuries, and it is now a single dwelling with an L-shaped plan. The building is timber-framed with crucks and brick nogging on a stone plinth. It is roofed in red tiles, with gables, one coped, the other with bargeboards. The building is in one storey with attics. The windows are later casements.	II
Delamere House; 53.2605°N 3.0269°W		Late 17th century	This is basically a timber-framed house with crucks, which was later altered and encased in rendered sandstone. The house has a stone plinth and a red tiled roof. It is in a single storey with an attic, and has a two-bay front. The windows are casements; that in the attic being in a half-dormer.	II
Pickerton Cottage; 53.2606°N 3.0270°W		Late 17th century	A sandstone house with a slate roof and stone copings. It is in two storeys, and has a three-bay front. The windows are mainly replacement casements.	II
Stanley House; 53.2606°N 3.0272°W		Late 17th century	The house was extended in the late 18th century, and altered in the 20th century. The original house is timber-framed with brick nogging on a sandstone plinth, and has a red tile roof. The extension to the left is in stone and has a slate roof. The original part has a single storey with an attic, and is in two bays. The extension has two storeys and one bay. The windows in the original part are 20th-century casements, those in the attic being in gabled dormers; the windows in the extension are sashes.	II
The White House; 53.2605°N 3.0263°W		Late 17th century	This originated as a farmhouse, later altered into a house with a shop, then into a private house. It is built in painted brick on a stone plinth with a slate roof. It is in two storeys with a four-bay front. Most of the windows are 19th-century casements.	II
Church Farmhouse; 53.2608°N 3.0253°W		1678	This originated as a farmhouse with an attached cottage, and was later converted into a single dwelling. The house is in brick with stone quoins on a stone plinth. The former cottage is rendered. Both have slate roofs. Both parts are in two storeys, the house having two bays, and the cottage having one. The windows are sashes.	II
Peartree Cottage; 53.2610°N 3.0258°W		1682	The cottage is built in sandstone and brick, and has a slate roof with red ridge tiles. It is in a single storey with a three-bay front, and a single-bay lean-to extension to the left. The windows are casements.	II
St Nicholas House; 53.2603°N 3.0275°W		1711	The house has been altered and extended. It is built in roughcast brick and has slate roofs. The main part has three storeys and a four-bay front, and the extension to the right has two storeys and one bay. The windows in the main part of the house are sashes, and in the extension and the porch they are casements.	II
St Nicholas' Church; 53.2617°N 3.0250°W		1721	The church incorporates a chapel dating from 1380, and the chancel was rebuilt in 1870. It is built in sandstone and has a slate roof. The church consists of a continuous nave and chancel, a north aisle, a north vestry and a west tower. The tower is in four stages and has a plain parapet and a clock face, the clock having only one hand.	II*
The Old School; 53.2614°N 3.0323°W		1724	This originated as a school with an attached schoolmaster's cottage. A rear extension was added in 1890, and the building has been converted into a residence. It is built in brick with a slate roof and coped gables. The School is in a single storey with a five-bay front, the end bays being gabled and projecting forwards, The cottage is in one storey and an attic, and has one bay.	II
Chest tombs 53.2615°N 3.0248°W		1740–83	A group of 18 chest tombs in the churchyard of St Nicholas. They are in sandstone and have various inscriptions. Many of these consist of indecipherable dates and names, but skull and crossbones and hourglass motifs can be identified.	II
Barn, Burton Marsh Farm; 53.2615°N 3.0471°W	—	Mid-18th century	The barn is built in sandstone with a slate roof and coped gables. It is in two storeys, including lofts, and has a four-bay front. Its features include round pitch holes and vertical slit ventilators.	II
Sundial; 53.26154°N 3.02500°W		18th century	The sundial is in the churchyard of St Nicholas. It is constructed in red sandstone and consists of a vase-shaped pillar on a square pedestal, standing on square base. The dial and gnomon are missing.	II
Windmill (remains); 53.26284°N 3.03132°W		1771	This was a tower windmill with a circular plan. It is built in sandstone, but only the lower eight courses and a date stone have survived.	II
Grave slabs 53.2616°N 3.0248°W		1783–1879	A group of eight grave slabs in the churchyard of St Nicholas. They are in sandstone and have various inscriptions, many of which consist of indecipherable dates and names.	II
Burton Manor; 53.2597°N 3.0285°W		c. 1805	A house that was remodelled in 1902–05 by Sir Charles Nicholson, with an orangery added in 1910. In 1948 it became an adult education college, but this closed in 2011. The house is built in sandstone with a green slate roof, and has a quadrilateral plan with a central courtyard. The entrance front is in two and three storeys and five bays, the central bay having an open pediment. The windows in the house and the orangery are sashes, and there is also a high-level Diocletian window in the orangery.	II
Ice House, Burton Manor; 53.25906°N 3.02984°W		c. 1805	The ice house is constructed in sandstone. It consists of two underground chambers linked by a passage, each chamber being approached by a separate flight of steps.	II
Coach House, Burton Manor; 53.2601°N 3.0288°W		1904	The coach house was designed by Sir Charles Nicholson and converted into a house in 1948. It is built in sandstone and has a roof of Westmorland slate. The house is in a single storey with attics, and has a front of three bays. On the roof are weatherboarded dormers, and a slate-clad clock tower with a pyramidal roof, and a weathervane in the form of a bird.	II
Wall, gate piers and library, Burton Manor; 53.26026°N 3.02896°W		1904	Designed by Sir Charles Nicholson, parts of the sandstone wall probably pre-date his design. The library is in sandstone with a hipped slate roof. It is in a single storey with three bays, and a flat-roofed extension to the right. The gate piers are in brick, standing in pairs on each side of the entrance. They have ball finials, and the pairs of piers are joined by stone lintels.	II
Burton in Wirral Peace Cross; 53.26257°N 3.02263°W		1917	The memorial stands near a road junction. It is in stone, and consists of a wheel-head cross on a tall four-sided plinth on a base of three steps. There are inscriptions on the three steps including a plea for peace.	II
Telephone kiosk 53.26043°N 3.02740°W		1935	A K6 type telephone kiosk, designed by Giles Gilbert Scott. It is constructed in cast iron, with a square plan and domed roof. In the panels around the top are three unperforated crowns.	II
