= Battle of Benfleet =

894 battle between Vikings and Wessex

- Part of Viking invasions of England
| Date | 894 |
| Location | South Benfleet 51.55°N 0.56°E |
| Result | Anglo-Saxon victory |

Belligerents
| Wessex; Mercia | Vikings |

Commanders and leaders
| Edward the Elder; Æthelred, Lord of the Mercians | Unknown |

Casualties and losses
| Unknown | Combat losses unknown Women and children captured Ships lost |
- Location within Essex

The Battle of Benfleet was an 894 battle between the Vikings and the Anglo-Saxons commanded by Edward the Elder and Æthelred, Lord of the Mercians, the son and son-in-law of Alfred the Great respectively. The battle was part of a campaign started by the Vikings in 892 to raid and potentially occupy lands in England, having been defeated by the armies of France. As part of this campaign the invaders were supported by those Vikings who had settled in England following an earlier invasion launched in 865. The battle was a victory for the Anglo-Saxons who successfully captured a number of women and children, as well as capturing or destroying the Viking ships.

After their defeat the Vikings continued to raid England until they disbanded in 895 after being forced to abandon a series of camps. The rest of Alfred's reign was peaceful, and he was succeeded by Edward as King of Wessex in 899. In time Edward would become the ruler of Mercia, uniting the two kingdoms.

== Background ==
=== Situation in England ===
England in 878

Following the victory of Alfred the Great over Guthrum at the battle of Eddington in 878, Guthrum became King of East Anglia and his army settled in that area. This marked the end of the campaigns of the Great Heathen Army of Vikings who had first attacked England in 865. Added to the land of East Anglia were those of Essex and south-east Mercia, forming Guthrum's kingdom, while Northumbria had been broken up, with the richest part forming the Viking kingdom of York under Halfdan, while the northern part survived under a local ruler, Eadwulf, ruling from Bamburgh. Mercia had also been broken up with the area west of Watling Street ruled by Aethelred, Alfred's son-in-law, and the area east of this but west of Guthrum's realm was controlled by a series of towns under Viking rule acting as independent states, and became known as the Five Boroughs. The area under Viking control became known as the Danelaw, signifying the Danish influence of the Vikings upon the local laws. Alfred then reorganized the defence of his kingdom, creating fortified towns known as burhs to defend major sites and lines of communication. He also reorganised the fyrd, the ad hoc levy of men for military service, into a mobile standing force. Together these changes allowed Alfred's armies to simultaneously defend against attacks from multiple directions, as would occur in the period 892–895.

=== Campaign ===
Following the peace between Alfred and Guthrum, Wessex was mostly free of Viking raids from the north. The potential for a renewal of war between Wessex and the Vikings was increased when Guthrum died in the 880s and was further enhanced when the Vikings in France suffered crushing defeats against the French armies. The Vikings left France in 892 loading their families, animals and equipment into 250 boats, landing in the area of the Rother river in south-east England. These Vikings rapidly overran Alfred's fortified town of Eorpeburnan before moving to Appledore in Kent where they built a small fortified town. At this point a second Viking fleet, led by Haestan and consisting of 800 men, sailed up the Thames and landed at Milton Regis, near the Isle of Sheppey. Unable to face both armies at once, Alfred negotiated a peace agreement with Haestan whereby both the Viking's sons were baptised and he agreed to leave Wessex in return for a sizeable payment. After this, Haestan withdrew to Benfleet in Essex.

While Alfred's negotiations with Haestan were ongoing the Vikings out of Appledore in the spring of 893 began raiding across Wessex until they were intercepted by Edward, Alfred's son, and routed at the battle of Farnham. These Vikings then retreated to, and fortified Thorney Island, situated in the braided River Colne south of Iver. Edward initially besieged the island but with supplies short and his men nearing the end of their term of service he was forced to withdraw. Alfred had intended to relieve Edward's army when he heard a fleet of 100 ships out of Danelaw was besieging Exeter and another fleet of 40 ships was raiding the Devon coast. Alfred was forced to turn to face the Vikings at Exeter while Edward was joined by Aethelred and a contingent of Londoners and returned to Thorney, finding the Vikings still there. After taking hostages Edward allowed the Vikings to retreat to Benfleet, to join those under the command of Haestan.

== Battle ==
In 894, Edward and Aethelred followed the Vikings to Benfleet where Haestan was absent on a raiding expedition. The Anglo-Saxons broke into the camp and managed to capture a number of women and children, including Haestan's wife and two sons. Haestan's family were sent to Alfred, who returned them to Haestan as part of the subsequent negotiations. Most of the Viking ships were also captured, with many being sent to London or Rochester. The rest were broken up or burnt. The surviving Vikings were joined by Haestan at Shoebury, where they made a new camp. The battle of Benfleet was one of the most complete victories gained over the Vikings on English soil up to that point.

Evidence of the battle was found during the construction of Benfleet railway station during the 19th century when human bones and charred timbers were discovered. It is possible that the Anglo-Saxon dead were buried near Benfleet church.

== Aftermath ==
At Shoebury, the Vikings received reinforcements from within the Danelaw, and then relocated across England to Buttington. This was near the Welsh border and Haestan sought the help of the Welsh princes, but they instead chose to honour an existing alliance with Alfred, recognising him as their overlord. Aethelred and the Ealdormen of Somerset and Wiltshire raised a great levy, and were joined by men from North Wales. This force besieged the Vikings and won a victory after the defenders were forced to attempt a breakout due to starvation. After this defeat the surviving Vikings fled back to Shoebury. The Anglo-Saxon army pursued them and forced them to leave Wessex and head for the deserted ruins of Chester. They were compelled by hunger and disease to abandon this position and moved into North Wales, where they pillaged for provisions. After nine months the Vikings left Wales and travelled through the Viking-held territories of Northumbria and East Anglia to reach Mersea Island in Essex. Leaving the island after a short time they sailed up the Lea river and established a camp near London. Alfred forced them out of this camp in 895 and the Vikings rode across England to establish a new camp at Bridgnorth. While Bridgnorth was besieged a diplomatic mission was sent to the Vikings of Northumbria and East Anglia to eliminate their support for the invaders. Once this had been accomplished, the Vikings at Bridgnorth disbanded.

Until Alfred's death in 899, relations between the Anglo-Saxons and their neighbours were largely peaceful. Upon his death Alfred was succeeded by Edward as King of Wessex, and Aethelred was succeeded by Aethelflaed, his wife, as ruler of the Mercians upon his death in 911. Edward took personal control of Mercia following Aethelflaed's death in 918, uniting the two kingdoms.

== Sources ==
- Costambeys, Marios (2004). "Æthelred". Oxford Dictionary of National Biography (online ed.). Oxford University Press. doi:10.1093/ref:odnb/52311. (Subscription, Wikipedia Library access or UK public library membership required.)
- Costambeys, Marios (2018). "Æthelflæd [Ethelfleda]". Oxford Dictionary of National Biography (online ed.). Oxford University Press. doi:10.1093/ref:odnb/8907. (Subscription, Wikipedia Library access or UK public library membership required.)
- Grainger, John D. (30 March 2019). The United Kingdom: The Unification & Disintegration of Britain Since AD 43. Pen and Sword. ISBN 978-1-5267-4820-1.
- Halfond, Gregory I. (28 March 2015). The Medieval Way of War: Studies in Medieval Military History in Honor of Bernard S. Bachrach. Ashgate Publishing, Ltd. ISBN 978-1-4724-1960-6.
- Kendrick, Sir Thomas D. (24 October 2018). A History of the Vikings. Routledge. ISBN 978-1-136-24239-7.
- Marren, Peter (18 September 2006). Battles of the Dark Ages. Pen and Sword. ISBN 978-1-84884-706-4.
- Potter, Philip J. (30 April 2020). The Mighty Warrior Kings: From the Ashes of the Roman Empire to the New Ruling Order. Pen and Sword History. ISBN 978-1-5267-5629-9.
- Sawyer, Peter (1 January 2010). "Danelaw". In Bjork, Robert E. (ed.). The Oxford Dictionary of the Middle Ages. Oxford University Press. ISBN 978-0-19-866262-4.
- Williams, Judith (18 December 2017). The Little History of Essex. The History Press. ISBN 978-0-7509-8514-7.
- Wormald, Patrick (2006). "Alfred [Ælfred]". Oxford Dictionary of National Biography (online ed.). Oxford University Press. doi:10.1093/ref:odnb/183. (Subscription, Wikipedia Library access or UK public library membership required.)
