= Wedgwood Memorial College =

Coordinates: 52.9429°N 2.1657°W

Wedgwood Memorial College was a small residential college in Barlaston, near Stoke-on-Trent in Staffordshire, England. The college was owned and operated by Stoke-on-Trent City Council until it was closed down by the council in March 2012. It still houses the centre of Esperanto education at Estoril House.

There is also a similarly named building in Burslem, the Wedgwood Institute, which is sometimes called the "Wedgwood Memorial Institute". This is a completely separate institution.

The college, a member of the Adult Residential Colleges Association, offered short courses in literature and languages (French, German and Esperanto); political science and history; and art, art history and architectural history. Wedgwood Memorial College had a non-circulating library with 15,000 volumes available for research and private study.

The buildings were also rented out for weddings, parties and small conferences, with eight rooms available that accommodated from ten to 40 people per room. One of these rooms is the Montagu C. Butler Library, located in Esperanto House on the grounds of the college.

== History of college ==
The Barlaston estate was acquired by Wedgwood in the 1930s, and the college opened in February 1945 in Barlaston Hall, a country house. The building was endangered by coal mining operations and a geological fault, which caused major diagonal cracks in the walls. The college moved from Barlaston Hall to Victorian and Edwardian buildings in Barlaston village.

== Esperanto instruction ==
Esperanto House, the headquarters of the Esperanto Association of Britain has its main office on the Estoril site of Wedgwood Memorial College.

Between 1960 and 2011, the last opportunity prior to its 2012 closure, Wedgwood Memorial College offered a week-long Esperanto summer school every August. This came about partly through the influence of Horace Barks, the Lord Mayor of Stoke-on-Trent, who was an advocate of Esperanto.

The college offered a weekend course in Esperanto theatre every January and a weekend residential course in Esperanto language every October. The Esperanto Association of Britain offers a partial subsidy to Esperanto learners attending the Wedgwood Memorial College programme and who have first completed such an introductory course.
