= Esperanto Association of Britain =

British association for Esperanto

- Esperanto-Asocio de Britio
- Abbreviation: EAB
- Predecessor: British Esperanto Association
- Formation: March 13, 1976; 50 years ago
- Registration no.: 272676
- Legal status: Charitable organization
- Region served: United Kingdom
- President: Gabriel Beecham
- Main organ: La Brita Esperantisto
- Affiliations: World Esperanto Association
- Website: esperanto.org.uk

The Esperanto Association of Britain (EAB; Esperanto: Esperanto-Asocio de Britio) is a registered educational charity whose objective is to advance education in and about the international language Esperanto and to preserve and promote the culture and heritage of Esperanto for the educational benefit of the general public. Its predecessor organisation, the British Esperanto Association (BEA, established in 1904; Esperanto: Brita Esperanto-Asocio), was one of the most active national Esperanto organisations during the 20th century.

Among its activities it publishes, provides and distributes information about the language and organises educational courses, lectures and conferences. It also provides a comprehensive bookshop with material from around the world.

== History ==
The British Esperanto Association was founded in October 1904 during a period of interest in Esperanto after the turn of the 20th century in the United Kingdom, where Esperanto had until then been slow to develop compared to other European countries. Its rules were finalised by 8 June 1905, and it was incorporated as a limited company on 1 May 1907. Britain previously had only small local groups of Esperantists, including a Keighley society founded in 1902, and early publicity in the press by W.T. Stead, who hosted the inaugural meeting of the London Esperanto Club in 1903. BEA coordinated local clubs, examinations, and the distribution of textbooks, while establishing a formal governance structure with an elected Council and a paid secretary.

BEA launched the magazine The British Esperantist in 1905, incorporating the earlier periodical The Esperantist in 1906. Early British Esperantists were inspired both by the idealism of Esperanto's founder, L. L. Zamenhof, and by the promise of practical benefits, such as international communication and commercial opportunities. Support from prominent figures, including Stead, Felix Moscheles, and Ebenezer Howard helped give the movement visibility and credibility in both cultural and peace-oriented circles.

During the interwar period, BEA undertook promotional, educational, and parliamentary activities. It ran correspondence courses, expanded its publishing programme, and engaged in lobbying efforts advocating for the inclusion of Esperanto in postwar international institutions such as the League of Nations. It hosted the World Congress of Esperanto in Edinburgh (1926), Oxford (1930), and London (1938), and membership surpassed 2,000 for the first time in 1931. BEA also sought to popularise Esperanto through advertising, public lectures, and dual-language publications with English text such as International Language (1924–1931).

During the Second World War, BEA maintained activities under wartime conditions, emphasizing preparation for postwar peace and international understanding. Membership increased, reaching a peak of 3,039 in 1945, largely driven by interest in postwar reconstruction and international cooperation. The association engaged in parliamentary advocacy, notably petitioning the government regarding the future role of Esperanto in education and international affairs. In the post-war era, membership declined steadily, and by 1952 it had fallen below 2,000. The BEA focused on internal activities and educational initiatives, including correspondence courses and its youth section. Efforts to modernize the organisation continued through the 1960s and 1970s, including broader parliamentary engagement, the foundation of a fund to encourage international travel for young people, and the production of English-language publications such as Esperanto Contact.

A separate charitable body, the Esperanto Association of Britain, was constituted in the late 1970s. According to The British Esperantist, EAB’s first constitution was adopted in March 1976, and the organisation was registered with the Charity Commission for England and Wales on 10 February 1977. Its predecessor body, BEA, remains registered as a dormant company, having transferred its stock and cash to EAB in 1995 and its property in 1999. The company’s directors are ordinarily drawn from EAB’s management committee.

Following the transition of assets from BEA, including the sale of BEA’s long-time headquarters on Holland Park Avenue in London, EAB operated a base on the campus of Wedgwood Memorial College in Barlaston, where it hosted residential courses, ran a national book service and maintained the Montagu C. Butler Library. After the closure of Wedgwood College in 2012, the association decentralised its activities, expanded its online provision, and in 2024 discontinued the use of a physical office, adopting a forwarding address for administrative purposes.

In 2012, EAB celebrated the 125th anniversary of the creation of Esperanto by Zamenhof in 1887.

== Publications ==
In January 1905 the British Esperanto Association launched its official organ, The British Esperantist, as a monthly publication. It was later retitled La Brita Esperantisto (briefly LBE from 2010 to 2014). Its frequency has varied over time: initially a monthly, it became bimonthly during World War II, quarterly in 1991, and since then a semi-annual magazine with Spring and Autumn issues.

Other regular publications include Update, a newsletter mainly in English covering activities related to the Esperanto movement in Britain.

The association is also active as a book publisher. In addition to its periodicals, it publishes original works, translations, and reprints of significant titles in Esperanto. During the early 2020s its output included 15 books in 2022 and 14 in 2023, followed by 10 titles in 2024. Its 2024 publishing programme comprised three strands: works connected with the “Bauldton” anniversary project honouring the centenary of Marjorie Boulton and William Auld; the completion of EAB’s six-volume edition of Tove Jansson’s Moomin books in Esperanto; and several standalone titles.

EAB has received multiple awards for its publishing activity in the Literary Arts Competitions of the World Esperanto Association, particularly in the field of publishing for children. In 2026 it won the “Children's book of the year” prize for its edition of Stig de la ŝutloko, a translation of Clive King's Stig of the Dump. This followed earlier wins for La krubalo, EAB's translation of The Gruffalo, in 2020; for La domo ĉe Pu-Angulo, its translation of A. A. Milne’s The House at Pooh Corner, in 2022; and for Doktoro Esperanto kaj la lingvo de Espero, written by Mara Rockliff and illustrated by Zosia Dzierżawska, in 2024.

In recognition of EAB’s wider publishing programme, its Director Tim Owen received the World Esperanto Association’s “Diploma for Outstanding Artistic Activity” in 2024.

== Offices ==
In earlier years, the offices of EAB were located at 17 Hart Street, London WC1, then 140 Holland Park Avenue, London W11.. In 2001 (after several months in temporary accommodation) the office relocated to a converted outbuilding at the Wedgwood Memorial College, Barlaston, Staffordshire,. In 2024, with most of its activities having moved online, the association moved out of its physical office and is now contactable through a forwarding address 483 Green Lanes, London, N13 4BS..

== See also ==
- Junularo Esperantista Brita Young British Esperantists
