= Ipstones Edge =

Geographical feature in Staffordshire, England

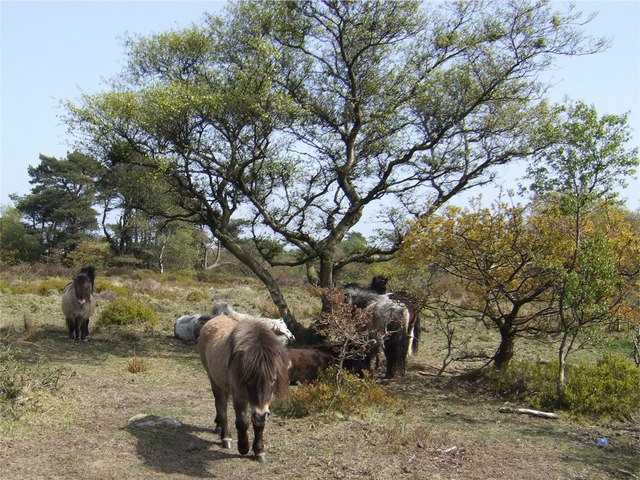
- Swineholes Wood

- Location within Staffordshire
- Location: near Ipstones, Staffordshire
- OS grid: SK 047 503
- Coordinates: 53°02′58″N 1°55′55″W
- Operator: Staffordshire Wildlife Trust
- Website: www.staffs-wildlife.org.uk/nature-reserves/ipstones-edge

Ipstones Edge is a geographical feature, a few mile south-east of Leek, and about 1 mile north-east of the village of Ipstones, in Staffordshire, England. It is in the local government district of Staffordshire Moorlands. Parts of the terrain comprise a nature reserve of the Staffordshire Wildlife Trust.

== Description ==
The elevation of Ipstones Edge is 386 metres (1,266 ft), and its prominence is 79 metres (259 ft). It is at the south-west end of the Pennines, and runs north-west to south-east for several miles.

The nature reserve at Ipstones Edge consists of three parcels of land: Swineholes Wood, Black Heath and Casey Bank.

=== Swineholes Wood and Black Heath ===
Swineholes Wood and Black Heath are heathland habitats that remain from what was in the 1700s a much larger area of heathland on the ridge, known as Little Morridge. Situated on the edge of the Pennines, they are at a transition between heathland to the south and upland moorland to the north, and so there is a particular range of plants and wildlife. They are together designated a Site of Special Scientific Interest.

The areas are managed to maintain a balance between heathland and woodland. Part of the area is stunted oak woodland, where there are heathland shrubs including bilberry. There is grazing by a small herd of cattle during the summer months.

=== Casey Bank ===
Casey Bank was acquired by the Trust in 1999, when it would otherwise have been subject to agricultural improvements. There are boggy areas with plants including bog asphodel, marsh valerian and marsh violets, and dryer areas with plants including adder's-tongue fern and moonwort.

=== Connected landscape ===
The area of the reserve has grown over the years. This is in accordance with the aim of the Wildlife Trusts, to have large-scale nature recovery projects, connecting fragments of land and working with surrounding landowners, to let wildlife move more freely.

== See also ==
- Morridge
