= Junularo Esperantista Brita =

JEB logo

Junularo Esperantista Brita (JEB) is the organisation for young Esperanto-speakers in the United Kingdom. Membership to JEB open to anyone aged under 30 living in Great Britain and Northern Ireland.

== History ==
In 1959, a group of young Esperanto-speakers formed Junularo Esperantista Brita as a youth offshoot of the British Esperanto Association, which had been the focal point for Esperanto-speakers of all ages in the United Kingdom since it was formed in 1904. Among these activists was Humphrey Tonkin, who led meetings and classes at the University of Cambridge. Some of the students attending these meetings would later go on to make big contributions in service of Esperanto, including world-renowned phonetician Professor John Wells, former president of the Esperanto Association of Britain, the Esperanto Academy, the World Esperanto Association and the International Phonetic Association.

JEB's activity ebbed over the next fifty years. A concerted effort to revitalise JEB took place when it was formally restarted in Glasgow in 2003, but it wasn't until 2006 that JEB truly showed a resurgence. The representatives of JEB met in Scarborough at EAB's annual congress and new members were voted onto JEB's committee, who restarted the association's activities.

From 2006, JEB's online presence was very visible through its website and forums, the latter of which are now offline. Members met periodically at events held in various towns in the UK. JEB attendance at international Esperanto events also during this period, with the UK being the third-best represented country at 2007's Internacia Seminario, held in Germany. JEB briefly reintroduced its magazine 'Saluton' for four issues, but this was discontinued after a committee decision in 2008 in preference of free-of-cost online delivery of JEB-related news and articles.

Since 2012, the association's activities have been primarily carried out through the JEB Facebook page, and in conjunction with a particularly active Esperanto youth group in London.

== Previous JEB events ==
City	Date
Stratford-upon-Avon	July 2007
Peterborough	March 2008
Buxton	July 2008
Cardiff	February 2010
York	June 2010
London	September 2011
Cambridge	March 2012
Liverpool	June 2012
Belfast	September 2012
Bristol	February 2013
Cardiff	June 2013
Aberdeen	March 2014
London	January 2014

== See also ==
- Esperanto Association of Britain
