= Listed buildings in Ipstones =

Professional photographer

Ipstones is a civil parish in the district of Staffordshire Moorlands, Staffordshire, England. It contains 96 listed buildings that are recorded in the National Heritage List for England. Of these, four are at Grade II*, the middle of the three grades, and the others are at Grade II, the lowest grade. Apart from the village of Ipstones, the parish is almost completely rural. The Caldon Canal passes through and ends in the parish, and the listed buildings associated with it are three bridges, a lock, a milestone and a milepost. A high proportion of the other listed buildings are houses, cottages and associated structures, farmhouses and farm buildings. The rest of the listed buildings include churches and a chapel, items in a churchyard, a road bridge, a former tramway terminus, a former warehouse, road mileposts, public houses, a hand pump, and a telephone kiosk.

== Key ==
| Grade | Criteria |
|---|---|
| II* | Particularly important buildings of more than special interest |
| II | Buildings of national importance and special interest |

== Buildings ==
| Name and location | Photograph | Date | Notes | Grade |
|---|---|---|---|---|
| Whitehough; 53.05885°N 1.98141°W | | 1620 | A farmhouse that was extended to the right in 1724, it is in stone, and has a tile roof with verge parapets on corbeled kneelers with moulded copings. There are two storeys and attics, and a complex plan, with the house in two parts. The early part has two gables with owl holes, chamfered windows, some with mullions, others with mullions and transoms, an inserted stair window, and a doorway with a two-light fanlight. The later wing projects to the right, and has raised bands, a central doorway with lintels grooved as voussoirs, and similar windows to the older part, together with cross windows with casements. There is a massive turret-like chimney stack. | II* |
| Gate Farmhouse; 53.03285°N 1.95000°W | — | 1624 | The farmhouse is in stone, and has a tile roof with verge parapets on corbelled kneelers. There is one storey and an attic, and three bays. The doorway to the left has a heavy Tudor arched lintel, the windows are mullioned casements, and there is a gabled dormer with a datestone. | II |
| Hay House Farmhouse; 53.04621°N 1.98769°W | — | 1625 | The farmhouse was extended to the rear in the 18th century and altered in the 19th century. It is in stone, and has a tile roof with pitched copings and verge parapets on corbelled kneelers. There are two storeys, and a T-shaped plan, with a main block and a later rear wing. The front is in two parts, with a projecting wing on a plinth to the right, and a three-bay wing recessed to the left. Most of the windows are mullioned, and the doorway has an arched hood. | II |
| 4 High Street; 53.04665°N 1.97017°W | — | 17th century | A house, at one time a shop, it is in stone, and has a tile roof with verge parapets on corbelled kneelers and pitched copings. There is one storey and an attic, and one bay. On the gabled front facing the street is a shop window and a two-light mullioned casement window above. In the left return is a doorway with a heavy lintel. | II |
| Above Church House, 88 Church Lane; 53.05115°N 1.97713°W | | 17th century | The house, which was rebuilt in the 19th century, is in sandstone with a moulded eaves band, and a tile roof with verge parapets. There are two storeys, a cellar and an attic, a main block of two bays with a projecting gabled porch, and a lower single-bay extension to the left. The windows are a mix of sashes and chamfered mullioned casements, and in the extension is a dormer. | II |
| Barn northwest of Belmont Hall; 53.04556°N 1.99732°W | — | 17th century (possible) | The barn was rebuilt in the 19th century and altered in the 20th century. It is in red sandstone with an eaves band, and has a tile roof with verge parapets. There is a single storey and an L-shaped plan. In the centre is a doorway with a heavy lintel flanked by small casement windows, with a segmental-headed cart entry to the right, and a double-door entry to the left. | II |
| Blackbrook Farmhouse; 53.06107°N 1.92468°W | — | 17th century | A stone farmhouse with string courses, and a tile roof with verge parapets and pitched copings on corbelled kneelers. There are two storeys and an attic, and three bays. The windows are chamfered and mullioned, with some mullions missing. | II |
| Barn east of Blackbrook Farmhouse; 53.06104°N 1.92417°W | — | 17th century | The barn is in stone, and has a tile roof with verge parapets. There are two levels, consisting of a hay loft over cow sheds and a stable. The barn contains a hay loft door, three vents, a window, and three doors, one with a heavy lintel and a Tudor arch. | II |
| Bolton Farmhouse; 53.03251°N 1.94809°W | — | 17th century | The farmhouse, which was altered in the 19th century, is in stone and has a tile roof. There are two storeys and an attic, and three bays. The windows on the front are casements, and elsewhere there are chamfered mullioned windows. | II |
| Booth's Hall; 53.03737°N 1.98254°W | — | 17th century | A farmhouse that was extended in the 19th century, it is in stone, and has a tile roof with verge parapets and pitched coping, and a cruciform plan. In the centre is the original range, forming a gabled cross-wing, on a chamfered plinth, that has two storeys and an attic and contains casement windows. Flanking the central range are 19th-century single-bay wings. In the west gable end are mullioned windows and a blocked owl hole. | II |
| Clough Meadow Cottage; 53.07142°N 1.99077°W | | 17th century | The house, which was repaired in the 18th century, is in stone and has a tile roof with verge parapets and rounded copings. There are two storeys and three bays. The windows have chamfered mullions in chamfered reveals, and the entrance is at the rear. | II |
| Meadow Place Farmhouse; 53.04298°N 1.96856°W | — | 17th century | A stone farmhouse with a moulded floor band, a moulded eaves band, and a tile roof with verge parapets. There are two storeys, three bays, and a doorway with a Tudor arch. Some of the windows are three-light chamfered mullioned casements, and others have been converted into small-pane casements. | II |
| Barn south of Meadow Place Farmhouse; 53.04286°N 1.96833°W | — | 17th century | The barn is in stone, and has a tile roof with verge parapets on corbelled kneelers. There are two levels, consisting of a hay loft over a byre. On the west front are two doorways with heavy lintels, and four windows, some of which are blocked. | II |
| Barn, Paddock Farm; 53.03956°N 1.96917°W | — | 17th century | A stone barn with a chamfered eaves band, and a tile roof with verge parapets. There are two levels, consisting of a hay loft over stables. The barn contains two stable doors, and three hay loft openings in the upper level. | II |
| Padwick Farmhouse; 53.07109°N 1.98107°W | — | 17th century | The farmhouse, which was restored in the 19th century, is in stone, and has a tile roof with verge parapets. There are two storeys and the house is in two parts. The right part has three bays, and contains a central doorway with a Tudor arch and chamfered mullioned casement windows. The left part projects slightly, it has two bays and contains a gabled dormer, two small windows, and a doorway with a heavy lintel. | II |
| Barn 300 metres north of The Hermitage; 53.03032°N 1.97099°W | — | 17th century | The barn is in stone with a chamfered eaves band, and a tile roof with verge parapets. There are two levels, with a hay loft over cow sheds. Part of the east front projects under a catslide roof; it contains an entrance with a chamfered lintel and another opening, to the right are 20th-century garage doors, and in the upper part are slit vents. | II |
| Booth's Farmhouse; 53.03638°N 1.98140°W | — | 1663 | The farmhouse is in sandstone, and has a tile roof with verge parapets and corbelled kneelers. There are two storeys, and a long three-bay front containing a full-height gabled porch. To its left and right are chamfered mullioned casement windows with hood moulds. The front of the porch is blind apart from a small oculus in a square block with inscribed circles in the angles. On the right side of the porch is a blocked entrance that has a Tudor arch with inset moulded spandrels. At the rear is a dormer with four mullioned lights. | II |
| Sharpecliffe Hall; 53.06676°N 1.98868°W | | 1673 | The house probably incorporates earlier fabric, and was restored and extended in the 19th century. It is in stone with quoins and moulded string courses, and has a tile roof with a crested ridge, and verge parapets with ball finials. The original part has two storeys and an attic and three gabled bays. On the front is a gabled porch with a Tudor arch and a coat of arms above. The windows are chamfered and mullioned, and one also has a transom. In the centre gable are two inscribed plaques. To the right is a later recessed wing with two storeys and two bays that contains a dormer, and to the left is another recessed wing. | II* |
| Laund Farmhouse; 53.05756°N 1.92739°W | — | Late 17th century | The farmhouse is in stone with a moulded eaves band, and a tile roof with verge parapets and pitched copings. There are two storeys, two bays, and a slightly projecting gabled wing on the left. In the gable apex is a circular owl hole, and the windows have chamfered mullions. | II |
| Barn north of The Stones Farmhouse; 53.04406°N 1.97516°W | — | 1680 | The barn is in stone and has a tile roof with verge parapets. There are two levels, with a hay loft above cattle sheds. It contains two entrances, one with a heavy lintel, and two hay loft doors above. In the south gable end is a datestone. | II |
| The Stones Farmhouse; 53.04382°N 1.97527°W | — | 1686 | The farmhouse was extended in the 18th century and altered in the 20th century. It is in stone on a plinth, with quoins, and a tile roof with verge parapets. There are two storeys and an attic, and three bays. The windows are casements, and there is a small window with an inscribed and dated lintel. | II |
| Barn north of Booth's Farmhouse; 53.03665°N 1.98133°W | — | 1687 | The barn is in stone with large quoins, and a tile roof with verge parapets. There are two levels, consisting of a hay loft over cow sheds. In the ground floor are two doorways with heavy lintels, one with a dated plaque, and a window, and in the upper level are grouped vents. | II |
| Barn northwest of Gate Farmhouse; 53.03322°N 1.95038°W | — | Late 17th or early 18th century | The barn is in stone and has a tile roof with verge parapets and pitched copings. There are two levels, with a hayloft over cattle sheds. The barn contains a hayloft door, top-hung casement windows, and entrances, one with a heavy lintel. | II |
| Littlestones Farmhouse; 53.04443°N 1.97737°W | — | Late 17th or early 18th century | The farmhouse is in stone and has a tile roof with verge parapets. There are two storeys and an attic, and the front is in three parts. In the centre are two bays containing casement windows and a doorway, to the left is a projecting gabled bay with chamfered mullioned casements, and to the right is a single-storey wing with a chamfered eaves band and a doorway with a heavy lintel. | II |
| The Hermitage; 53.02850°N 1.96968°W | — | Late 17th or early 18th century | The farmhouse, which was altered and extended in the 19th century, is in sandstone, and has a tile roof with verge parapets and pitched copings. There are two storeys, two parallel ranges, and a front of two bays. The doorway has a heavy lintel incised into an ogee arch with a circle in the tympanum, and the windows are mullioned casements. | II |
| Barn north of Laund Farmhouse; 53.05769°N 1.92750°W | — | 1717 | The barn was extended in 1886. It is in stone with a tile roof, and has two levels, consisting of a hay loft over a cattle shed. The barn contains two hay loft doors, three windows, and paired doorways with dated lintels. | II |
| Walls, Whitehough; 53.05873°N 1.98124°W | — | 1719 | The walls, which were extended in the 18th century, enclose the garden and the drive to the south and east of the house. They are in stone, and are ramped up to rusticated piers in the centre and at the angles; the outer piers have ball finials, and the inner ones have urns. | II |
| Former stables, Whitehough; 53.05926°N 1.98150°W | — | 1724 | The former stables are in stone with quoins and coped gable ends. There is one storey and a loft, and a front of four bays. The building contains a three-light mullioned window, a small window, and two doorways, one of which has been replaced by a window, and the other has a large lintel with a recessed dated panel. | II |
| Brown Edge Farmhouse; 53.07265°N 1.97026°W | | Early 18th century | A stone farmhouse with a tile roof, two storeys, and three bays. The doorway has a moulded surround, and the windows are chamfered mullioned casements. | II |
| Barn north of Hay House Farmhouse; 53.04659°N 1.98757°W | — | Early 18th century | The barn is in stone with a chamfered eaves band, and a tile roof with verge parapets. There is one storey and an L-shaped plan, with a lean-to on the north. The barn contains a cart entry with a heavy lintel, and another opening. | II |
| Barn northeast of Lower Lady Meadows Farmhouse; 53.07430°N 1.96150°W | | Early 18th century | The barn was extended in the 19th century. It is in stone and has a tile roof, an L-shaped plan, and two levels with hay lofts over cattle sheds and a cart house. The earlier part has verge parapets on corbelled kneelers, and a hay loft door above three doors, two with heavy lintels. The later wing contains a mullioned window and an elliptically-arched cart entry. | II |
| New House Farmhouse, Bottom Lane; 53.05536°N 1.96183°W | | Early 18th century | The farmhouse is in stone with a floor band, and a tile roof with verge parapets on corbelled kneelers. There are two storeys, three bays, a lean-to on the left, and a single-bay extension on the right. On the front is a gabled porch, and the windows are three-light chamfered mullioned casements. | II |
| Barn west of New House Farmhouse, Bottom Lane; 53.05544°N 1.96233°W | — | Early 18th century (probable) | The barn is in stone with a quadrant eaves band, and has a tile roof with verge parapets and pitched copings. There are two levels, consisting of a hay loft over a cattle shed. On the south side are two loft doors, and in the east gable end are dove nesting boxes and ledges, and an opening with a round-arched head below them. | II |
| Barn north of New House Farmhouse, Far Lane; 53.04141°N 1.97051°W | — | Early 18th century | The barn is in stone, and has a tile roof with verge parapets on corbelled kneelers. There are two levels, consisting of a hay loft over cattle sheds. In the upper storey are two hay loft doors with five openings in the ground floor, all with heavy lintels. | II |
| Sexton Farmhouse; 53.05820°N 1.95699°W | — | Early 18th century | The farmhouse is in stone, with a tile roof that has a verge parapet to the right with pitched coping. There are two storeys and three bays. On the front is a projecting single-storey extension containing a doorway, and the windows are casements, some with mullions. | II |
| Barn 20 metres north of The Hermitage; 53.02876°N 1.96956°W | — | Early 18th century | The barn is in sandstone with a chamfered eaves band, and a tile roof with a verge parapet. There are two levels, with a hay loft above cattle sheds, and a long front of about 25 metres (82 ft). In the lower level are two wide entries, and three doors with heavy lintels, and in the upper level is a hay loft door. | II |
| Barn northeast of Whitehough; 53.05911°N 1.98081°W | — | Early 18th century | The barn is in stone on a plinth, and has a tile roof and verge parapets with pitched coping on corbelled kneelers. There are two levels consisting of a hay loft over cattle sheds, an L-shaped plan with a front about 25 metres (82 ft) long, and a lean-to outshut to the north. The barn contains doorways, casement windows and vents. | II |
| Gazebo, Whitehough; 53.05889°N 1.98202°W | | Early 18th century | The gazebo is in stone and has a pyramidal tiled roof. It has a square plan, and one storey over a cellar. The gazebo contains a Tudor arched doorway over a cellar door, and a cross window. | II* |
| Pigsties and bull pen, Whitehough; 53.05909°N 1.98162°W | — | Early 18th century | The buildings are in stone, and have a tile roof and verge parapets with pitched copings. The bull pen has a single storey and contains a door. The pigsties are under a roof built up against a wall, and have three units, each with a heavy lintel. In front are feed trough bins with segmental heads. | II |
| Sundial, Whitehough; 53.05873°N 1.98152°W | — | Early 18th century | The sundial is in stone and has a two-stepped base, on which stands a chamfered square shaft about 600 millimetres (24 in) high. The head is missing. | II |
| Clerks Bank Farmhouse; 53.05371°N 1.97996°W | — | 1727 | The farmhouse was later extended and altered. It is in stone with a tile roof, and has two storeys, three bays, and a lower extension to the right. The middle bay, with was originally a porch, projects and is gabled with verge parapets on corbelled kneelers. In its upper floor is a three-light chamfered mullioned window, and the other windows are casements. The gable contains a dated panel. | II |
| Hawkes Farmhouse, 53 High Street; 53.04846°N 1.96771°W | — | Early to mid 18th century | A stone house that has a tile roof with verge parapets. There are two storeys, a symmetrical front of two bays, and a brick lean-to on the right. In the centre is a gabled porch with wavy bargeboards, and the windows are three-light mullioned casements. | II |
| East View, 62 Back Lane; 53.04387°N 1.96773°W | — | 1742 | A stone house with a string course, a moulded eaves band, and a tile roof with verge parapets on corbelled kneelers. There are two storeys and two bays. The windows are three-light chamfered mullioned casements, and there are two doorways, the left doorway with a heavy dated lintel. | II |
| 5, 7 and 9 High Street; 53.04683°N 1.97023°W | — | 18th century | A house, later divided into three, it is in red brick with stone dressings, quoins, and a red tile roof with verge parapets. There are three storeys and three bays. To the right are two flat-roofed canted bay windows, the other windows are three-light mullioned casements, and above the doorways are heavy lintels. | II |
| 11 High Street; 53.04688°N 1.97000°W | — | 18th century | A stone house on a partial plinth, with a moulded eaves band, and a tile roof with verge parapets and pitched copings. There are two storeys and two bays. The windows are sashes with wedge lintels, and the doorway, which is in the left gable end, has a flat hood. | II |
| 14 High Street; 53.04689°N 1.96968°W | — | 18th century | The house, which was refronted in the 19th century, is in brick with diapering, rendered dressings, a raised sill band, and a tile roof. There are two storeys, three bays, and a rear block. The central doorway has a semicircular fanlight, and the windows on the front are sashes with wedge lintels. The window above the doorway has a round-arched head and a keystone. In the rear block are mullioned casement windows. | II |
| Barn east of Booth's Farmhouse; 53.03654°N 1.98099°W | — | Mid 18th century (probable) | The barn, which was extended in the 19th century, is in stone, and has a tile roof with verge parapets. It is about 30 metres (98 ft) long, with two levels, consisting of a hay loft over cattle sheds, and is in two parts. The earlier part to the north has two doors, casement windows, and vents, and the longer and lower part to the south contains a central opening with a heavy lintel, and three hay loft doors. | II |
| Froghall Bridge; 53.02196°N 1.96481°W | | 18th century | The bridge carries the A52 road over the River Churnet and the Churnet Valley Railway, the road bridge being extended to cross the railway in the 19th century. It is in rusticated stone, and consists of two elliptical arches. | II |
| Lower Lady Meadows Farmhouse; 53.07428°N 1.96180°W | | 18th century | The farmhouse, which was extended in the 19th century, is in stone, and has a tile roof with verge parapets and pitched copings. There are two storeys, an L-shaped plan, and a front of two bays. The doorway has a lintel with an inset shield, and the windows are three-light mullioned casements. | II |
| Lower Park Farmhouse; 53.04371°N 1.95096°W | — | 18th century | A stone farmhouse that has a roof of concrete pantiles with verge parapets. There are two storeys and an attic, and two bays. The windows have two lights and mullions, and contain 20th-century casements. | II |
| New House Farmhouse, Far Lane; 53.04107°N 1.97054°W | — | 18th century | A stone farmhouse on a plinth, with a floor band, and a tile roof with verge parapets and pitched copings. There are two storeys and three bays. The windows are mullioned and contain small panes and central sashes. | II |
| Tearn Farmhouse; 53.04232°N 1.97020°W | — | 18th century | The farmhouse, which was later extended, is in stone, and has a tile roof with verge parapets on the left. The house is in two parts. The earlier part to the right has two storeys and an attic, two bays, a central gabled porch, and three-light mullioned casement windows. The extension to the left has two storeys, one bay, and contains a 20th-century casement window. | II |
| Belmont Hall; 53.04529°N 1.99681°W | | c. 1760 | A large house in rendered sandstone, with an eaves band and a hipped tile roof. The entrance front has two storeys and an attic, three bays, and a central small Corinthian portico. The approach front has a three-storey three-sided bay window to the left, and a lower two-storey recessed wing to the right. The windows are sashes. To the west is a service wing with eight bays and three doorways. | II |
| 24, 26 and 28 High Street; 53.04755°N 1.96866°W | — | 1774 | A house, at one time an inn and later altered, it is in two parts, with a rear wing, two storeys, a tile roof, and verge parapets. The main part is in brick with quoins, an eaves band, and two bays. In the centre is a gabled porch and a quoined doorway flanked by bay windows with hipped roofs. In the upper floor are sash windows with wedge lintels and raised keystones. To the left is a lower one-bay stone extension containing a datestone with a coat of arms, and in the rear wing are mullioned casement windows. | II |
| 60 Church Lane; 53.04906°N 1.97461°W | — | Late 18th century | A stone house that has a tile roof with a verge parapet on the right, three storeys, and one bay. To the right is a doorway with a heavy lintel, and the windows are two-light mullioned casements. | II |
| Marquis of Granby Public House; 53.04684°N 1.97071°W | | Late 18th century | A house, later a public house, it was extended in the 19th century. It is in red brick with stone dressings, dentilled eaves, and a tile roof with verge parapets on the central block. The building is in three parts; the central block has three storeys and two bays, a porch, sash windows in the upper floors and casement windows on the ground floor. To the right is an extension with three storeys, one bay, bands, and sash windows with stone lintels, and to its right is a lean-to former stable with double stable doors replaced by a window. To the left is another extension, with two storeys, two bays, a central doorway, and sash windows, all with stone lintels. | II |
| Red Lion Inn; 53.04658°N 1.97108°W | | Late 18th century | Originally two houses, they were extended in the 19th century, and have been converted into a public house. It is in stone with rusticated quoins, floor bands, and a tile roof. The building is in two parts with continuous eaves. The older part on the left has three storeys and three bays; the later part has two storeys and two bays. The left doorway has pilasters, a frieze, and a cornice, and the right doorway has a pediment. The windows are a mix of sashes and casements. | II |
| Sandy Lodge, Bottom Lane; 53.05153°N 1.96388°W | — | Late 18th century | The house was extended in the 20th century. The original part is in stone, the extension is in brick, and the roof is tiled and has verge parapets. There are two storeys, the original block has two bays, the extension to the left has one bay, there is a garage extension to the right, and an outshut at the rear. In the ground floor of the original block are two-light mullioned casement windows, and elsewhere the windows are 20th-century casements. | II |
| Twist Intake, High Street; 53.04659°N 1.97028°W | — | Late 18th century | A red brick house with stone dressings that has a tile roof with verge parapets and pitched copings. There are three storeys and a symmetrical front of two bays. The central doorway has a quoined surround, and the windows are three-light small-paned casements with wedge lintels and raised keystones. | II |
| House north of village school 53.04638°N 1.96939°W | — | Late 18th century | A stone house that has a tile roof with verge parapets and pitched copings. There are three storeys and a symmetrical front of three bays, the middle bay with a gablet containing a shield. The windows are chamfered mullioned casements, with two lights in the upper floor, and three lights in the ground floor. | II |
| Cherryeye Bridge; 53.03091°N 1.98037°W | | c. 1779 | The bridge carried a road over the Caldon Canal. It is in stone and consists of a single span with a hump back. The parapet has a flat top, and is slightly curved out at the ends. | II |
| Bridge at Consall Forge; 53.03957°N 2.00179°W | | c. 1779 | An accommodation bridge (No. 50), it carries a track over the Caldon Canal. The bridge is in stone, and consists of a single elliptical arch. It has a flat-topped parapet, which is horizontal over the arch, ramped down on both sides, and makes a concave sweep to the north. | II |
| Consall New Lock; 53.03316°N 1.99524°W | | c. 1779 | The lock (No. 17) on the Caldon Canal has retaining walls in sandstone with some repairs in concrete. There are winding stone steps, and a wooden-framed catwalk over entrance. | II |
| Milestone southeast of Bridge No. 53; 53.03012°N 1.97882°W | | c. 1779 | The milestone is on the towpath of the Caldon Canal. It has a triangular plan and a rounded top, and is about 60 centimetres (24 in) high. On the sides of the milestone is inscribed "1" and "16". | II |
| Bridge at Froghall Wharf; 53.02661°N 1.96202°W | | c. 1783 | The bridge carries a road over the Caldon Canal, it is in stone, and consists of a single virtually round arch. The bridge has a string course, and an inclined parapet with round coping and end piers. | II |
| Tramway terminus and wall 53.02707°N 1.95957°W | — | c. 1783 | The retaining walls at the former tramway terminus are about 8 metres (26 ft) high and 40 metres (130 ft) long. They contain two buttresses and two arches, one for a water channel. | II |
| St Leonard's Church; 53.04924°N 1.97489°W | | 1789–92 | The chancel designed by Gerald Horsley was added to the church in 1902–03. The church is built in sandstone and has roofs of tile and stone slate. It consists of s nave, a south porch, a chancel, and a west tower. The tower has three stages, angle buttresses rising to pilasters and then to pinnacles, a west window, and an embattled parapet. The nave and chancel also have embattled parapets, the east window has four lights, and above it on the exterior is a low relief of The Crucifixion. | II* |
| Chapel House; 53.04603°N 1.99354°W | | c. 1790 | The building was planned as a chapel but never completed, and has since been used as a house. It is in stone with a tile roof, and consists of a nave and a chancel in one unit, and a west tower. The tower has two stages and buttresses, windows with Y-tracery, and a pyramidal roof. The windows are mullioned, some with transoms, and the east window has a pointed head, four lights, and geometric tracery. | II |
| The Grove, 5 Church Lane; 53.04670°N 1.97153°W | | Late 18th to early 19th century | A stone house with quoins, a raised eaves band, and a tile roof with verge parapets. There are three storeys and three bays. The central doorway has pilasters, a pulvinated frieze, and a pediment. To its left is a flat-roofed bay window, to the right is a sash window with a pediment, and above it is a Venetian window. The other windows are sash windows with moulded surrounds, those in the middle floor with raised keystones. | II |
| Furnihough memorial 53.04939°N 1.97508°W | — | 1804 | The memorial is in the churchyard of St Leonard's Church, and is to the memory of Jonah Furnihough. It is a chest tomb in stone, and has incised sides inset at the angles, waisted balusters that are gadrooned below the waist and support a fluted frieze, and a top slab with a cornice. | II |
| Oulsnam memorial 53.04951°N 1.97511°W | — | 1819 | The memorial is in the churchyard of St Leonard's Church, and is to the memory of Thomas Oulsnam. It is a pedestal tomb in stone, and has a square plan. The tomb has a moulded plinth, inset sides with reeded pilasters at the angles, a frieze with fleurons, and a surbase with a cornice. | II |
| Prince memorial 53.04940°N 1.97526°W | — | 1819 | The memorial is in the churchyard of St Leonard's Church, and is to the memory of Paul Prince. It is a chest tomb in stone, and has incised sides inset at the angles, square waisted balusters that have capitals carved with fleurons, and a top slab with a cornice. | II |
| Slack memorial 53.04933°N 1.97489°W | — | 1819 | The memorial is in the churchyard of St Leonard's Church, and is to the memory of Ann and Josiah Slack. It is a chest tomb in stone, and has a moulded plinth, incised ovals on the sides, reeded pilasters at the angles under a frieze, a break with fleurons, and a top slab with a cornice. | II |
| Canal milepost 53.03477°N 1.99867°W | | 1820 | The milepost is in the towpath of the Caldon Canal. It is in cast iron, and consists of a circular shaft with convex plates and a domed top. On the plates are the distances to Etruria and Uttoxeter, and on the shaft is a small plate with the date and initials of the manufacturer. | II |
| Scarrat memorial 53.04937°N 1.97500°W | — | 1821 | The memorial is in the churchyard of St Leonard's Church, and is to the memory of Thomas Scarrat. It is a chest tomb in stone, and has incised sides inset at the angles, waisted balusters that are gadrooned below the waist and support a frieze with fleurons, and a top slab with a cornice. | II |
| Belmont Farmhouse and outbuildings 53.04728°N 1.99585°W | — | Early 19th century | The farmhouse dates from about 1860. The buildings are in sandstone with hipped tiled roofs. There are two storeys and a U-shaped plan, with the farmhouse forming the west range. This has seven bays, and contains chamfered mullioned windows and two doorways. The outbuildings form the other two ranges, and include a segmental-arched coach entry, now blocked. | II |
| Froghall Wharf warehouse 53.02647°N 1.96180°W | | Early 19th century | The warehouse, later used for other purposes, is in red brick and has a slate roof. There are two storeys, and it contains small-pane casement windows and an entrance, all with segmental heads. On the west side the verge projects as a hoist cover, and on the south side is a canted boarded and gabled hoist. | II |
| Megcrofts, Bottom Lane; 53.05216°N 1.96468°W | — | Early 19th century | A stone farmhouse that has a tile roof with verge parapets. There are two storeys, an L-shaped plan, and a front of three bays, the right bay gabled. In the centre is a projecting flat-roofed porch with a parapet and a Tudor arched entrance, and the windows are sashes. | II |
| The Cottage, Park Lane; 53.04904°N 1.96189°W | — | Early 19th century | A stone house with rusticated quoins, a floor band, a moulded eaves band, and a tile roof. There are two storeys, a double-depth plan, and a symmetrical front of three bays. In the centre is a doorway, and the windows are sashes with raised surrounds and lintels grooved as voussoirs. | II |
| Ball memorial 53.04942°N 1.97490°W | — | 1829 | The memorial is in the churchyard of St Leonard's Church, and is to the memory of Thomas Ball. It is a chest tomb in stone, and has twin incised panels on the sides and incised implied pilasters, and a moulded plinth and top slab. | II |
| Milepost at SK 047 524; 53.06952°N 1.93095°W | | 1834 | The milepost is on the southwest side of the A523 road, and is in cast iron. It consists of a cylindrical post with an enlarged head and a domed top. On the head are the distances to Leek and Ashbourne, and on the post is the distance to London. | II |
| Milepost at SK 059 514; 53.06047°N 1.91220°W | | 1834 | The milepost is on the southwest side of the A523 road, and is in cast iron. It consists of a cylindrical post with an enlarged head and a domed top. On the top is the date and the name of the manufacturer, on the head are the distances to Leek and Ashbourne, and on the post is the distance to London. | II |
| Sea Lion Inn; 53.04501°N 1.96878°W | | 1836 | The public house is in stone with rusticated quoins, a floor band, a moulded eaves band, and a tile roof. There are two storeys and four bays. The doorway has a quoined surround, the windows are sashes, and the window above the doorway has a round head, pilasters, and a keystone. | II |
| St Mark's Church, Foxt; 53.03635°N 1.94741°W | | 1838 | The church is in stone with a tile roof, and consists of a nave and a chancel in one unit, a south porch, and a west tower. The tower has three stages, a south doorway with a Tudor arch, string courses, and machicolations under an embattled parapet. The windows are lancets, and the east window contains Y-tracery. | II |
| Wesleyan Chapel; 53.04659°N 1.96932°W | — | 1838 | The chapel is in red brick on a plinth, with a cogged eaves band and a hipped slate roof. There is one storey, a square plan, and a symmetrical front of two bays. The central doorway has a flat hood, and above it is an inscribed cast iron plaque. The windows are cross-casements with wedge lintels. | II |
| Brook House, High Street; 53.04772°N 1.96841°W | — | c. 1840 | A stone house with rusticated quoins, an eaves band, and a tile roof with verge parapets. There are two storeys and three bays. The central doorway has a pulvinated frieze and a pediment on consoles. The windows are sashes with lintels grooved as voussoirs and keystones, and the window above the doorway is round-headed with pilasters. | II |
| Gates, piers and walls, Sharpecliffe Hall; 53.06644°N 1.98828°W | | Late 19th century | The walls, which may incorporate earlier fabric, are in stone with deep pitched copings, and sweep round to square piers about 2.5 metres (8 ft 2 in) high that have ball finials on a moulded base. The ornate gates are in wrought iron. | II |
| Terrace garden walls, Sharpecliffe Hall; 53.06646°N 1.98872°W | — | Late 19th century | The three tiers of terraces are retained by walls about 14 metres (46 ft) high and 100 metres (330 ft) long. The walls are in stone, the top wall has deep pitched copings, and the other walls have flat coping. There are flights of steps between the terraces with balustrades and ball finials. | II |
| Hand pump and enclosure 53.04825°N 1.96781°W | — | 1876 | The hand pump, which steads in an enclosure on the northwest side of High Street, is in cast iron and is about 1,200 millimetres (47 in) high. It has a shaft in three stages with bands, an enlarged fluted head, and a double-curved handle. The enclosure is formed by a stone wall on three sides, with an inscribed plaque. | II |
| Milepost against southwest pier of Froghall Bridge; 53.02172°N 1.96514°W | — | Early 20th century (possible) | The milepost is on the north side of the A52 road. It is in cast iron, and has a triangular section and a sloping top. On the top is "FROGHALL" and on the sides are the distances to Ipstones, Onecoat, Leek, Warslow, Longnor, Buxton, and Cheadle. | II |
| Milepost at SK 021 484; 53.03423°N 1.97000°W | | Early 20th century (probable) | The milepost is on the west side of the B5053 road. It is in cast iron, and has a triangular section and a sloping top. On the top is "IPSTONES" and on the sides are the distances to Ipstones, Onecoat, Leek, Warslow, Longnor, Buxton, Froghall, and Cheadle. | II |
| Milepost at SK 021 500; 53.04743°N 1.96902°W | | Early 20th century (probable) | The milepost is on the north side of High Street. It is in cast iron, and has a triangular section and a sloping top. On the top is "IPSTONES" and on the sides are the distances to Onecoat, Leek, Warslow, Longnor, Buxton, Froghall, and Cheadle. | II |
| Milepost at SK 039 525; 53.07005°N 1.94290°W | — | Early 20th century (probable) | The milepost is on the northwest side of the B5053 road. It is in cast iron, and has a triangular section and a sloping top. On the top is "IPSTONES" and on the sides are the distances to Ipstones, Onecoat, Leek, Warslow, Longnor, Buxton, Froghall, and Cheadle. | II |
| Milepost at SK 029 515; 53.06015°N 1.95834°W | — | Early 20th century (probable) | The milepost is on the west side of the B5053 road. It is in cast iron, and has a triangular section and a sloping top. On the top is "IPSTONES" and on the sides are the distances to Ipstones, Onecoat, Leek, Warslow, Longnor, Buxton, Froghall, and Cheadle. | II |
| Milepost at SK 052 513; 53.05908°N 1.92234°W | | Early 20th century (probable) | The milepost is on the west side of Ellastone Road. It is in cast iron, and has a triangular section and a sloping top. On the top is "IPSTONES" and on the sides are the distances to Leek, Ellastone, Rocester, and Uttoxeter. | II |
| Telephone kiosk 53.04678°N 1.97058°W | — | 1935 | The K6 type telephone kiosk, designed by Giles Gilbert Scott, stands outside the Marquis of Granby Public House. Constructed in cast iron with a square plan and a dome, it has three unperforated crowns in the top panels. | II |
