= Sir Charles Nicholson, 2nd Baronet =

British architect (1867–1949)

Sir Charles Nicholson Bt
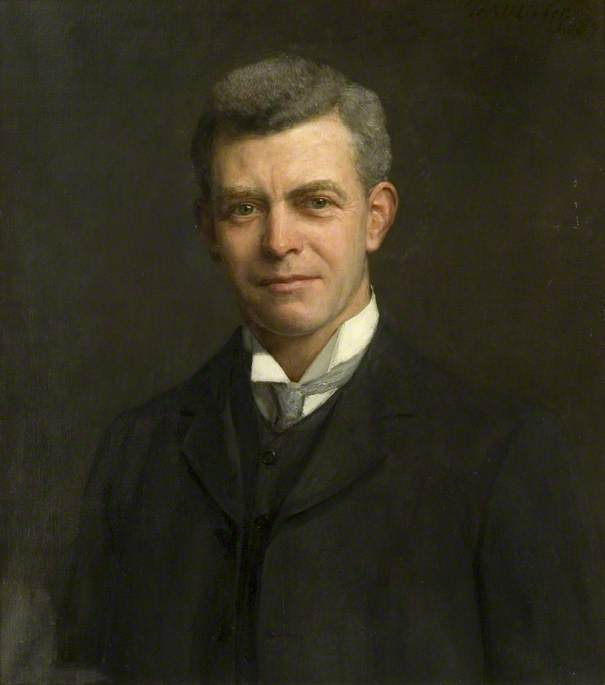
- Painting of Nicholson by Herbert Arnould Olivier
- Born: 27 April 1867; Hadleigh, Essex
- Died: 4 March 1949 (aged 81)
- Occupation: Architect
- Spouses: Evelyn Louise Olivier (m. 1895; died 1927) Catherine Maud Warren (m. 1931)
- Children: 3, including John
- Father: Sir Charles Nicholson, 1st Baronet

Sir Charles Archibald Nicholson, 2nd Baronet (27 April 1867 – 4 March 1949), was an English architect and designer who specialised in ecclesiastical buildings and war memorials. He carried out the refurbishments of several cathedrals, the design and build of over a dozen new churches, and the restoration of many existing, medieval parish churches.

Nicholson was born in Hadleigh, Essex to Sir Charles Nicholson, 1st Baronet, and his wife, Sarah Elizabeth Nicholson née Keightley. His younger brothers were the stained-glass artist Archibald Keightley Nicholson and Sir Sydney Hugo Nicholson, the founder of the Royal School of Church Music.

Nicholson was married first to Evelyn Louise Nicholson née Olivier (1866–1927) and they had three children, a son, John, and two daughters. His second wife was Catherine Maud Warren, who survived him upon his death in 1949.

== Early life ==
Nicholson was born in Hadleigh, Essex, to Sir Charles Nicholson, 1st Baronet, and his wife, Sarah Elizabeth Nicholson née Keightley. His younger brothers were the stained-glass artist Archibald Keightley Nicholson and Sir Sydney Hugo Nicholson, organist at Westminster Abbey and the founder of the Royal School of Church Music. Nicholson attended Rugby School and New College, Oxford, obtaining a third class in modern history in 1889. He took an interest in architecture and was apprenticed to the architect J. D. Sedding, under whom he learnt the Victorian Gothic style. He worked for a short time for Henry Wilson before founding his own practice in 1893. He won the Tite Prize in 1893 and was elected a fellow of the Royal Institute of British Architects in 1905. Hubert Corlette later partnered him until 1916. From 1920 Nicholson worked with Theodore Rushton.

== Career ==
In addition to designing churches, Nicholson conducted the refurbishments of many medieval churches. In addition to his ecclesiastical commissions, he was also a prolific designer of public war memorials, including one at his former school in Rugby. Nicholson's Anglican cathedral work included a new east chapel in Norwich, the west front of St Anne's Cathedral, Belfast (where he was the cathedral's architect between 1924–48) various additions to Chelmsford Cathedral, and the reconstruction of Portsmouth Cathedral. His internal restorations were carried out at Brecon, Carlisle, Exeter, Leicester, Lichfield, Lincoln, Llandaff, Manchester, Salisbury, Wakefield, Wells, and Winchester. His works abroad include the ministerial buildings for the Jamaican Government in Kingston.

Nicholson's works include 42 new churches, nine new chapels, and work on nine cathedrals. Nicholson took on the alterations and restorations of many medieval churches, together with the designs of a large amount of church furnishings. The majority of his work was in England, but he also worked in Wales, Northern Ireland, Jamaica and South Africa. He was also an accomplished watercolourist who exhibited at the Royal Academy on 32 occasions.

From 1890, Nicholson carried out a lot of restoration work to his local parish church, St Mary the Virgin in South Benfleet. He designed the reredos between 1890–91, completely restored the south aisle between 1924-5, and designed much of the building's furnishings and fittings. His gilded border, which he completed in 1935, incorporated previous paintings by his mother, Sarah. These were repainted in 1958. Barbara Nicholson, one of his daughters, painted the ciborium.

== Personal life ==
Nicholson succeeded to the baronetcy in 1903. He largely avoided publicity and preferred to conduct a quiet life with his family.

Nicholson was married twice: firstly, on 1 October 1895, to the diarist and watercolour painter Evelyn Louise Nicholson née Olivier (1867–1927), daughter of the Reverend Henry Arnold Olivier, sister of Sydney Haldane Olivier (1859–1943), and aunt of Laurence Olivier. The Nicholsons had a son, John Nicholson, 3rd Baronet and two daughters, including the medical artist, Barbara Nicholson. In 1912, Nicholson purchased Porters, a manor house in Southend-on-Sea to save it from demolition, living there until 1932, when it was sold to Southend Corporation who in 1935 opened it as the Mayor's parlour and civic house.

On 10 June 1931, four years after Evelyn's death, Nicholson married Catherine Maud Warren (1883–1962) at the Church of All Saints, Southend-on-sea, Essex.

Nicholson died on 4 March 1949 in Oxford and is buried in the Church of St Mary the Virgin, South Benfleet. He is buried, alongside his first wife, in a stone memorial he designed for her, on the south side of the west tower. His second wife was buried there upon her death in 1962. The tomb was designated as a Grade II listed building on 9 November 2021 by Historic England.

== Partial list of works ==
Nicholson's architectural works include (in chronological order):

- St Andrew's Vicarage (now renamed Church End House), Totteridge, Hertfordshire (1892, Nicholson's first work)
- Enlargement of St Matthew's Church, Yiewsley, Middlesex (1897-1898)
- St Alban the Martyr, Westcliff-on-Sea, Essex (1898-1908)
- Chancel fittings for Christ Church, Chester (1900–10)
- Remodelling of Burton Manor, Cheshire (1902)
- Enlargement of Clifton College Chapel, Bristol (1909–10)
- Major alterations to St Oswald's Church, Guiseley, West Yorkshire (1910 etc.)
- Chernockehouse, Winchester, Hampshire (1910–12)
- St Mary's Church, Cattedown, Plymouth, Devon (1911–12)
- St Luke's Church, Grimsby, Lincolnshire (1912)
- St Paul's Church, Halifax, West Yorkshire (1912)
- Restoration of All Saints' Church, Cadney, Lincolnshire (1912–14)
- New nave and chancel of St Lawrence's Church, Scunthorpe, Lincolnshire (1913)
- St John the Divine, Rastrick, West Yorkshire (1913)
- St Clement's Church, Leigh-on-Sea, Essex (1913 and 1919)
- St Alban's church, Copnor, Hampshire (1914)
- St Michael's Church, Sutton Ings, East Riding of Yorkshire (1915)
- War memorial for St John's Church, Coleford, Gloucestershire (1918)
- Sotterley War Memorial, Suffolk (1920)
- North chapel of St Michael's Church, Basingstoke, Hampshire (1920)
- Chapel of the Resurrection and vestries for St James' Church, Grimsby, Lincolnshire (1920)
- Restoration of St Giles' Church, Oxford (1920)
- Enlargement of SS Philip and James' Church, Oxford (1920–21)
- Memorial Chapel of Rugby School, Warwickshire (1920)
- Hornchurch war memorial, Essex (1921)
- Church of St John the Evangelist, Long Eaton, Derbyshire (started 1922)
- Screen in the Church of St Mary the Virgin, Saffron Walden, Essex (1924)
- Church of the Ascension, Bitterne Park, Hampshire (1924–26)
- Our Lady of Lourdes and St Joseph, Leigh-on-Sea, Essex (1924-1929), based on original designs for St Alban's Westcliff-on-Sea
- St Dunstan's Church, Bellingham Estate, Lewisham (1925)
- Completion of Christ Church, Gosport, Hampshire (1925)
- Restoration of Shrewsbury Castle, Shropshire (1926)
- Completion of St Matthew's Church, Southsea, Hampshire (1926, now the Church of the Holy Spirit)
- Chelmsford Cathedral: new east end (1926) and bishop's throne
- Chancel screen of the Church of St Margaret, Bowers Gifford, Essex (1926)
- St Mary's Church, Springbourne, Bournemouth (1926–34)
- St Michael and All Angels, Leigh-on-Sea, Essex (started 1926, completed after his death 1957)
- Chapel and library for St Boniface College, Warminster, Wiltshire (1927)
- Bishop's throne and stalls for Leicester Cathedral (1927)
- St Michael's Church, Castleford, West Yorkshire (1927–29)
- Altar and reredos of the Church of St Mary and St Cuthbert, Chester-le-Street, County Durham (1928)
- St John's Church, Stafford (started 1928, uncompleted)
- Enlargement of Church of St Laurence, Upminster, Essex (1928)
- New St Mary's Church, Frinton-on-Sea, Essex (1928–29)
- Lady chapel and choir vestry in Holy Trinity Church, Gosport (1929)
- Restoration of St Mary's Church, Hamstead Marshall, Berkshire (1929)
- St Andrew's Church, Bromley (1929)
- West doors of St Anne’s Cathedral, Belfast (1929)
- Seamen's home at Alton, Hampshire (1929–36)
- Stained glass east window for the Horner Chapel of St Andrew's Church, Mells, Somerset (1930)
- Restoration of Christ Church, Gosport, Hampshire (1930s)
- Lady Chapel of Norwich Cathedral (1930–32)
- St George's Church, Barkingside, Essex (1931)
- Rebuilding parts of SS Peter and Paul's Church, Fareham, Hampshire (1931–32)
- St John's Church, Dudley Wood, Staffordshire (now West Midlands, 1931)
- St Margaret's Church, Leigh-on-Sea, Essex (1931)
- St Peter's Church, St Helier, London (1932)
- Reredos and choir stalls of St Petroc's Church, Bodmin, Cornwall (1932)
- St Elizabeth's Church, Becontree, Essex (1932)
- Refurbishment of St Sepulchre-without-Newgate, London, 1932
- Residential block at Malling Abbey, Kent (1935)
- Screen of the north chapel of St Mary's Church, Droxford, Hampshire (1935)
- Sheffield Cathedral enlargement (1936) and bishop's throne (1937)
- St Thomas of Canterbury's Church, Camelford, Cornwall (1938)
- Enlargement of Portsmouth Cathedral (1938–39), Hampshire
- Restoration of Wakefield Cathedral (1939)
- Monument to FH Lindley Meynell in Holy Angels Church, Hoar Cross, Staffordshire (1941)
- Reredos in Lady Chapel of the Church of St Saviour-on-the-Cliff, Shanklin (1948)
- Roof decoration for St Mary's Church, Ketton, Rutland (completed in 1950 after his death)

=== Undated ===
- The roof of Alton Abbey, Hampshire
- Nave altar and railings for Lincoln Cathedral
- Altar, reredos and communion rails for St Michael's Church, Macclesfield, Cheshire
- Font cover for St Chad's Church, Stafford
- Pulpit for St Michael's Church, Stone, Staffordshire
- Grange Mansions, Totteridge, Hertfordshire
- Furnishings for the Essex Regiment Chapel at Warley Barracks, Little Warley, Essex
- The pulpit of St Andrew's Church, West Chelborough, Dorset
- Southend War Memorial, Essex
- Mosaic design for the Church of SS Mary and Nicholas, Wilton, Wiltshire
- Reredos for All Saints' Church, Wolverhampton
- Burwash War Memorial, East Sussex
- Havant War Memorial, Hampshire (jointly with Alfred Edwin Stallard)
- Stained glass window of St Michael and St George First World War memorial, St Mary Magdalene, Sparkford, Somerset

== References and further reading ==
- Brodie, Antonia; Felstead, Alison; Franklin, Jonathan; Pinfield, Leslie, eds. (2001). Directory of British Architects 1834–1914. Vol. L–Z. London & New York: Continuum. ISBN 082645514X.
- Bundock, Edwin (2013). Sir Charles Nicholson (1867–1949) Architect of Noble Simplicity. Jewel Tree Publications.
- Lloyd, David W.; Pevsner, Nikolaus (2006). The Isle of Wight. The Buildings of England. London: Yale University Press. ISBN 978-0-300-10733-3.
- Nairn, Ian; Pevsner, Nikolaus; Cherry, Bridget (revision) (1971) [1962]. Surrey. The Buildings of England (2nd ed.). Harmondsworth: Penguin Books. ISBN 0-14-071021-3.
- Newman, John (1969). North East and East Kent. The Buildings of England. Harmondsworth: Penguin Books. ISBN 0-14-071039-6.
- Newman, John; Pevsner, Nikolaus (1972). Dorset. The Buildings of England. Harmondsworth: Penguin Books. ISBN 0-14-071044-2.
- O'Brien, Charles; Bailey, Bruce; Pevsner, Nikolaus; Lloyd, David W. (2018). Hampshire: South. The Buildings of England. London: Yale University Press. ISBN 978-0-300-22503-7.
- Pevsner, Nikolaus (1952). London. The Buildings of England. Vol. 2 Except the Cities of London and Westminster. Harmondsworth: Penguin Books. ISBN 0-14-071006-X.
- Pevsner, Nikolaus (1958a). Shropshire. The Buildings of England. Harmondsworth: Penguin Books.
- Pevsner, Nikolaus (1958b). North Somerset and Bristol. The Buildings of England. Harmondsworth: Penguin Books.
- Pevsner, Nikolaus (1960). Leicestershire and Rutland. Penguin Books. ISBN 978-0-14-071018-2.
- Pevsner, Nikolaus (1962). North-East Norfolk and Norwich. The Buildings of England. Vol. 1. Harmondsworth: Penguin Books.
- Pevsner, Nikolaus (1966). Berkshire. The Buildings of England. Harmondsworth: Penguin Books.
- Pevsner, Nikolaus (1972). Yorkshire: York & the East Riding. The Buildings of England. Harmondsworth: Penguin Books. ISBN 0-14-0710-43-4.
- Pevsner, Nikolaus (1974). Staffordshire. The Buildings of England. Harmondsworth: Penguin Books. ISBN 0-14-071046-9.
- Pevsner, Nikolaus; Cherry, Bridget (revision) (1975) [1963]. Wiltshire. The Buildings of England (2nd ed.). Harmondsworth: Penguin Books. ISBN 0-14-0710-26-4.
- Pevsner, Nikolaus; Cherry, Bridget (revision) (1977) [1953]. Hertfordshire. The Buildings of England (2nd ed.). Harmondsworth: Penguin Books. ISBN 0-14-071007-8.
- Pevsner, Nikolaus; Harris, John (1964). Lincolnshire. The Buildings of England. Harmondsworth: Penguin Books.
- Pevsner, Nikolaus; Hubbard, Edward (1971). Cheshire. The Buildings of England. Harmondsworth: Penguin Books. ISBN 0-14-071042-6.
- Pevsner, Nikolaus; Lloyd, David (1967). Hampshire and the Isle of Wight. The Buildings of England. Harmondsworth: Penguin Books.
- Pevsner, Nikolaus; Radcliffe, Enid (revision) (1965) [1954]. Essex. The Buildings of England. Harmondsworth: Penguin Books. ISBN 0-14-0710-11-6.
- Pevsner, Nikolaus; Radcliffe, Enid (revision) (1967) [1959]. Yorkshire the West Riding. The Buildings of England. Harmondsworth: Penguin Books. ISBN 0-14-071017-5.
- Pevsner, Nikolaus; Radcliffe, Enid (revision) (1970) [1951]. Cornwall. The Buildings of England. Harmondsworth: Penguin Books. ISBN 0-14-071001-9.
- Pevsner, Nikolaus; Wedgwood, Alexandra (1966). Warwickshire. The Buildings of England. Harmondsworth: Penguin Books.
- Pevsner, Nikolaus; Williamson, Elizabeth (revision) (1978) [1953]. Derbyshire. The Buildings of England (2nd ed.). Harmondsworth: Penguin Books. ISBN 0-14-071008-6.
- Pevsner, Nikolaus; Williamson, Elizabeth (revision) (1983) [1953]. County Durham. The Buildings of England (2nd ed.). Harmondsworth: Penguin Books. ISBN 0-14-071009-4.
- Pevsner, Nikolaus; Cherry, Bridget; O'Brien, Charles (2005). London 5: East. The Buildings of England. Vol. 5. London: Yale University Press.
- Sherwood, Jennifer; Pevsner, Nikolaus (1974). Oxfordshire. The Buildings of England. Harmondsworth: Penguin Books. ISBN 0-14-071045-0.
- Verey, David (1970). Gloucestershire: The Vale and the Forest of Dean. The Buildings of England. Vol. 2. Harmondsworth: Penguin Books.
- Evelyn Nicholson’s trip to Australia, 1897, University of Sydney Library

Baronetage of the United Kingdom
Preceded by Charles Nicholson	Baronet (of Luddenham); 1903–1949	Succeeded by John Charles Nicholson
