= Horace Barks =

- Born: 1895; Ipstones, Staffordshire
- Died: 1983 (aged 87–88)
- Known for: Lord Mayor of Stoke-on-Trent; Esperanto

Horace Barks, OBE (1895-1983) was a British Labour politician. He was Lord Mayor of Stoke-on-Trent in 1951–2.

Barks was born in Ipstones in the Staffordshire countryside and came from a working-class background. His experiences in World War I left him with pacifist beliefs and experience of railway operations. After the war he became a train guard and, in 1921, a member of the Labour Party, the dominant party in Stoke-on-Trent during the twentieth century. He was elected a councillor in 1930 and made an Alderman in 1948. He served as Mayor for 1951–52.

Barks' cultural interests included Esperanto and the writer Arnold Bennett. Barks and his son Guy were active in the Arnold Bennett Society, which is based in Stoke-on-Trent. The reference library in the city is named after Barks.

== Esperanto ==
Barks was involved with starting classes at the Wedgwood Memorial College in Barlaston, which remains an important centre of Esperanto education.

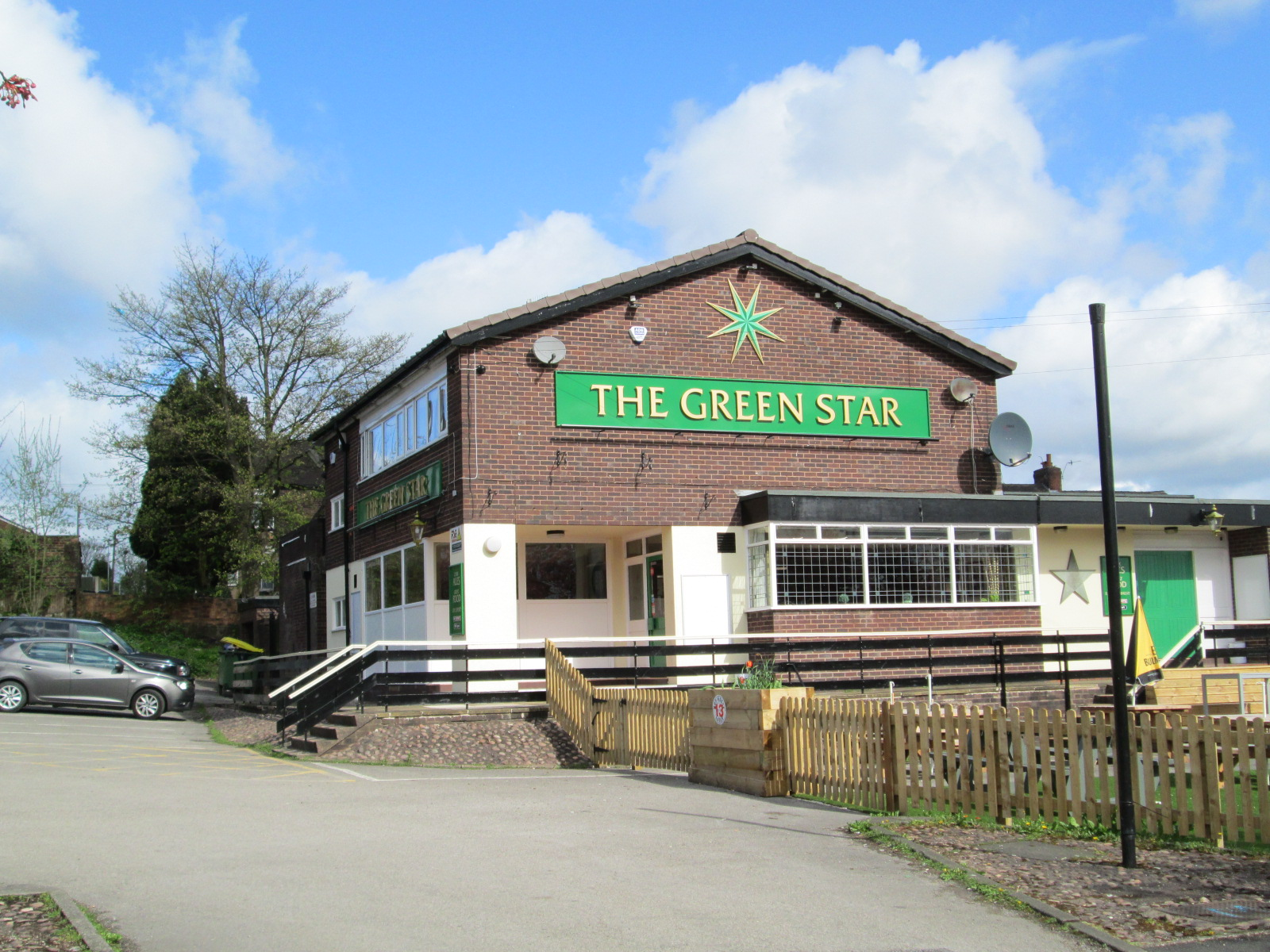
The Green Star

Through Barks' influence his local pub in Smallthorne, Stoke-on-Trent, acquired the name "The Green Star" (an Esperanto symbol) and a sign in Esperanto "La Verda Stelo". It is mentioned in a poem by Raymond Schwartz. Smallthorne also has a street named after Zamenhof.
