= Burton Mere Wetlands =

Nature reserve on the England–Wales border

Coordinates: 53.26201°N 3.04487°W

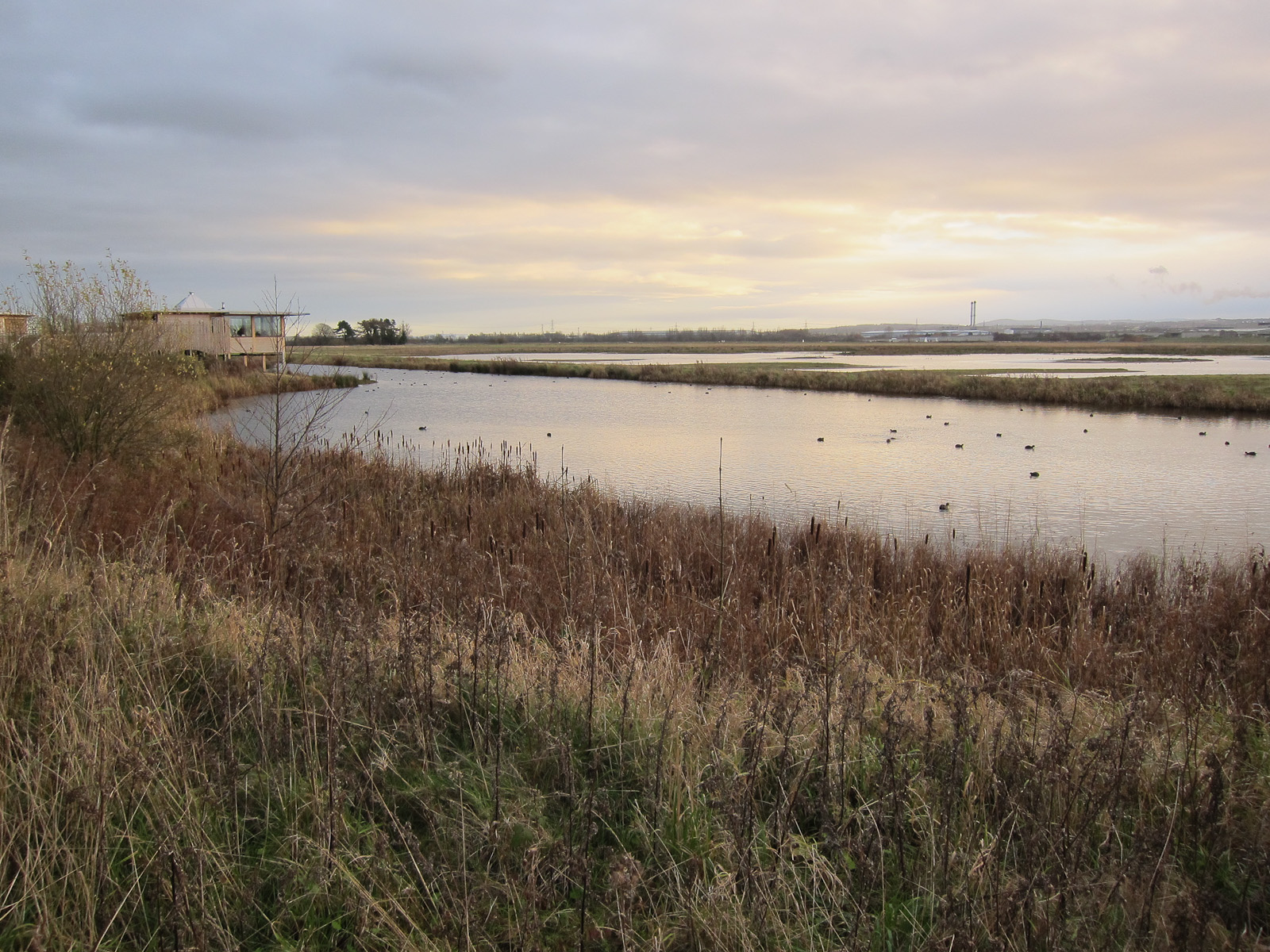
View towards the reception hide

Burton Mere Wetlands (grid reference SJ304744) is a nature reserve on the Dee Estuary straddling the border between Cheshire, England and Flintshire, Wales. It is run by the Royal Society for the Protection of Birds (RSPB) and incorporates the older Inner Marsh Farm reserve. It lies near the village of Burton, about 3 kilometres (1.9 mi) south of Neston. It has all been developed by the RSPB and includes a large area of mixed wetland habitats, bluebell woodlands, and arable fields all managed to attract wildlife.

The reserve is open from 9 am until 9 pm (or dusk if sooner) and the reception hide is open from 9:30 am until 5 pm. There is a charge for non-members of the RSPB.

== History ==
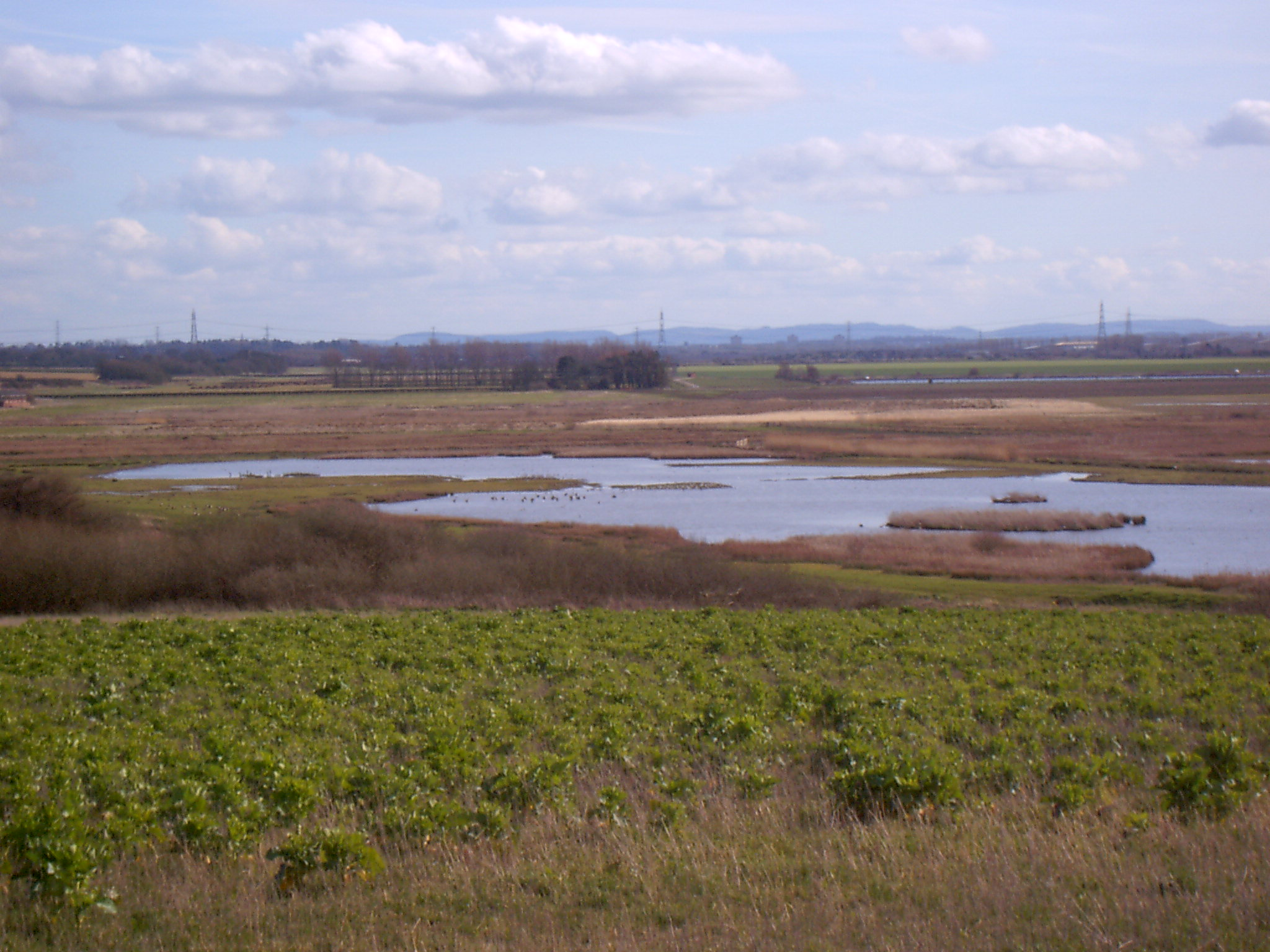
View over Inner Marsh Farm in 2007

The site consisted of tidal mudflats until the late 19th century when it was reclaimed during the building of the Wrexham to Bidston railway line. The resulting land was used for grazing and duck shooting and was later used for arable farming.

The RSPB bought land for the original Inner Marsh Farm reserve in 1986 and the reserve opened in June 1992. Three shallow, freshwater pools were created as well as a footpath leading to a hide overlooking the pools. Because of restrictions from the local council, the RSPB did not publicise the reserve and access was originally for members only. The reserve was closed on Tuesdays for essential maintenance. There was a small car park at the end of an untarmacked road, signposted for Burton Point Farm, off Station Road.

The reserve was enlarged by the purchase of land at Burton Marsh Farm in 2006 and Burton Mere Fisheries in 2008. New wetland areas were created along with additional visitor facilities including a reception hide, toilet block and a new entrance and car park. The reserve was renamed Burton Mere Wetlands in September 2011 when the new section was officially opened by the television presenter and naturalist Iolo Williams. Further paths and screens including a path linking the old and new sections of the reserve were opened in April 2014.

In March 2022 a fire broke out on the Neston reedbed section of the nature reserve, the result of a suspected arson attack, burning ten hectares of the marsh.

== Wildlife ==
Birds include a variety of waders through the winter and migration seasons including significant numbers of black-tailed godwit, spotted redshank, greenshank and ruff. Winter also brings many ducks including pintail, shoveller, teal and wigeon, as well as small numbers of Bewick's swan and whooper swan. Birds of prey can be seen over the marsh, from the reserve or from nearby Denhall Lane; these include short-eared owl, hen harrier, marsh harrier, merlin, kestrel and peregrine falcon.

Breeding birds include good numbers of nationally declining waders such as lapwing and redshank. Avocet also breed on the new pools. Yellow wagtail, skylark, sedge warbler, reed warbler, lesser whitethroat, grasshopper warbler and reed bunting all occur. A colony of little egrets and grey herons breeds in a nearby wood. Western cattle egret bred after an influx in 2017, and nesting attempts by great egret and Eurasian spoonbill were observed in subsequent years. Ten pairs of Mediterranean gulls nested on the reserve in summer 2019.

Mammals on the reserve include harvest mouse, water vole and European hare. Daubenton's bats feed over the wetlands. Insects include the wall brown butterfly and the red-eyed damselfly.

The pools on the reserve are surrounded by reedmace, sea club-rush, grey club-rush, soft rush and hard rush. Areas of damp grassland contain marsh foxtail, floating sweet-grass, creeping bent and soft rush. Wild flowers include marsh marigold and fleabane. Whilst wild orchids such as southern marsh orchid can be found in abundance, bee orchids are also present.
