= Ipstones =

Village in Staffordshire, England

Coordinates: 53.05°N 01.97°W

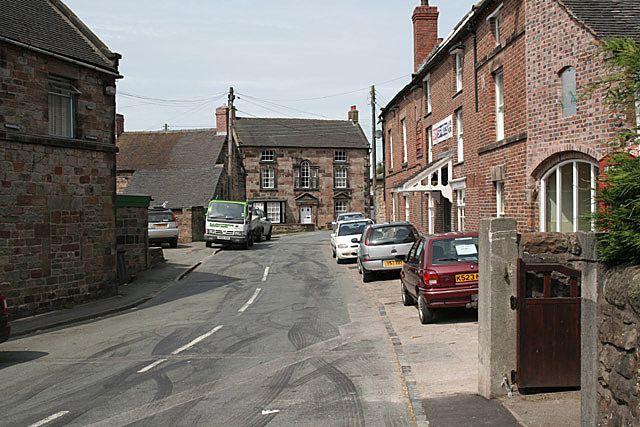

- Location within Staffordshire
- Population: 1,488 (2011)
- OS grid reference: SK0249
- Shire county: Staffordshire
- Region: West Midlands
- Country: England
- Sovereign state: United Kingdom
- Post town: Staffordshire Moorlands
- Postcode district: ST10
- Police: Staffordshire
- Fire: Staffordshire
- Ambulance: West Midlands

Ipstones Inclosure Act 1777
- Act of Parliament
- Parliament of Great Britain
- Long title: An Act for dividing and enclosing the several Commons and Waste Grounds, within the Manor and Parish of Ipstones, in the County of Stafford.
- Citation: 17 Geo. 3. c. 130 Pr.
- Territorial extent: Great Britain

Dates
- Royal assent: 16 May 1777
- Commencement: 31 October 1776 (Note: Start of session.)

Status: Current legislation

Ipstones is a village and civil parish in the north of the English county of Staffordshire.

Ipstones is part of the Staffordshire Moorlands district; within the boundaries of the civil parish are the hamlets Foxt, Consall Forge and Bottomhouse. Ipstones Edge, to the north of the village, rises to 1,250 feet (380 m) and gives views for many miles around.

Ipstones is not mentioned in the Domesday Book and dates from around the 12th century. The majority of the houses and farms, barring modern development, are built from local sandstone. Two sections of the village are designated as Conservation Areas with several listed structures contained within them.

Ipstones was served by a railway station opened by the North Staffordshire Railway on 15 June 1905, on its line between Leekbrook Junction and Waterhouses. The station was closed to passengers on 30 September 1935. The buildings have been demolished but heritage trains of the Churnet Valley Railway now use the line again and there have been proposals to restore mineral trains to Caldon Low.

Ipstones has three pubs, a butcher's, a corner shop, an agricultural supplies store, a church and a primary school.

== Notable people ==
- Horace Barks, OBE (1895-1983), train guard, interested in Esperanto, Labour politician & Lord Mayor of Stoke-on-Trent in 1951–2.

== See also ==
- Listed buildings in Ipstones
