= St Nicholas Church, Burton =

Coordinates: 53.2617°N 3.0250°W

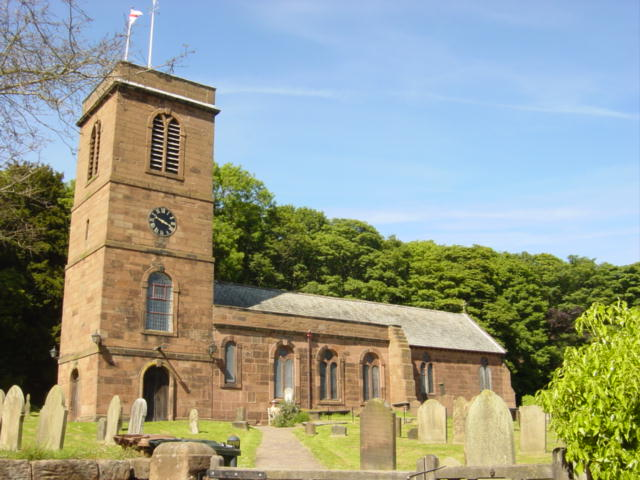
- St Nicholas Church from the southwest

- Location in Cheshire
- OS grid reference: SJ 317 744
- Location: [[Burton, Cheshire West and Chester], Cheshire
- Country: England
- Denomination: Anglican
- Website: St Nicholas, Burton

History
- Status: Parish church

Architecture
- Functional status: Active
- Heritage designation: Grade II*
- Designated: 27 December 1962
- Architectural type: Church
- Completed: 1870

Specifications
- Materials: Red sandstone Grey slate roofs

Administration
- Province: York
- Diocese: Chester
- Archdeaconry: Chester
- Deanery: Wirral South
- Parish: Burton

Clergy
- Vicar: Vacant

St Nicholas Church is in the village of Burton, Ellesmere Port and Neston, Cheshire, England. It is recorded in the National Heritage List for England as a designated Grade II* listed building. It is an active Anglican parish church in the diocese of Chester, the archdeaconry of Chester and the deanery of Wirral South. Its benefice is combined with that of St Michael, Shotwick.

== History ==
Relics of an earlier church dating from the 12th century consist of Norman stones which have been dug up in the churchyard and are now preserved in the porch and beneath the tower. Apart from the Massey chapel which was erected in 1380, the present church was built in 1721. The chancel was rebuilt in 1870.

== Architecture ==
=== Exterior ===
The church stands in an elevated position above the houses of the village and is approached through Georgian gate posts. It is built in red sandstone with grey slate roofs. The plan of the church consists of a west tower, a four-bay nave which is continuous with a two-bay chancel, a north aisle and a vestry to the northeast of the aisle. At the east end of the aisle is the Massey chapel. The tower is in four stages. Doors are on the north and south faces. Above the south door is a semicircular-headed window and above this a clock with a single hand. The belfry windows are louvred. At the top of the tower is a cornice and a solid parapet. Externally on the south side, between the nave and chancel, is a multi-stepped buttress. Built into one of the walls of the tower is a coffin lid dating from the 13th century which is decorated with a foliated cross.

=== Interior ===
The font is massive and plain with a Gothic oak cover. The altar rails are Jacobean and consist of alternate twisted and turned balusters. The sanctuary chair dates from the reign of Charles II. The stained glass in the east window of the chancel is by Kempe. One of the Massey memorials is in marble and dated 1579, the other is in alabaster and dated 1794. In the church is a hatchment bearing the arms of the Congreve family and other memorials to this family. The memorial to Richard Congreve who died in 1820 is by S. Gibson and includes a weeping putto. The organ was built around 1935 by the John Compton Organ Co and renovated in 1985 by Rushworth and Dreaper. There is a ring of six bells. Five of these were cast by Rudhall of Gloucester in 1724 and the other bell, dated 1896, is by John Taylor and Company. The parish registers start in 1538.

== External features ==
In the churchyard is a group of 18 chest tombs, and a group of eight raised grave slabs, which are listed Grade II. Also listed Grade II is a red sandstone sundial from the 18th century. It consists of a vase-shaped pillar on a square pedestal standing on a square base slab. Also in the churchyard is the war grave of a First World War soldier of the Royal Engineers.

== See also ==
- Grade II* listed buildings in Cheshire West and Chester
- Listed buildings in Burton, Neston, Cheshire
