= Sir John Nicholson, 3rd Baronet =

English surgeon

Sir John Charles Nicholson, 3rd Baronet, (10 January 1904 – 16 March 1986) was an English surgeon. Born in Surrey, and educated at Brighton College and New College, Oxford, he qualified as a surgeon in 1929 and won the Willet Medal for excellence in operative surgery. He was appointed as the house surgeon to many London hospitals, including St Bartholomew's Hospital, where he later became a demonstrator in physiology and pharmacology. Later, he was appointed the surgical registrar to the London Lock, the National Temperance and Royal National Orthopaedic hospitals. From 1950 he was a surgeon at the Bethnal Green, and St Leonard's and St Matthew's Hospitals in East London. He retired to Sunbury-on-Thames in 1969 and died in 1986.

== Biography ==
=== Early life and career ===
Nicholson was born on 10 January 1904 in Chilworth, Surrey. He was the second of three children and the only son to the English architect Sir Charles Nicholson, 2nd Baronet, and his wife, Evelyn Louise Nicholson née Olivier (1867–1927). He was educated at Brighton College and New College, Oxford, before entering St Bartholomew's Hospital for his clinical studies. He married Dr Caroline MacNeice, a medical practitioner, in 1928. In 1929 he qualified as a surgeon and won the Willet Medal for operative surgery. He was appointed as the house surgeon to the Prince of Wales Hospital in Tottenham, and to St Bartholomew's Hospital in the City of London, where he later became a demonstrator in physiology and pharmacology.

In 1932 Nicholson joined the Army Reserve. During the conflict he served in the Royal Army Medical Corps as a surgical specialist in the rank of Lieutenant-Colonel. After demobilisation he was awarded the Territorial Decoration. In 1947 he moved to Cambridge, Massachusetts, where he held the post of Fellow in Surgery at Harvard University; he returned to England the following year. Nicholson inherited the baronetcy in 1949 after the death of his father. From 1950, for 19 years, he was appointed as surgeon to the Bethnal Green, St Leonard's and St Matthew's Hospitals in East London.

=== Later life and retirement ===
Nicholson retired from medicine in 1969 and lived with his wife at Sunbury-on-Thames, where he indulged in his hobby of sailing. He died on 16 March 1986, aged 82.

== Personal life ==
Nicholson's father was a prolific and noted architect and designer of ecclesiastical buildings and war memorials. Sir John's grandfather, Sir Charles Nicholson, 1st Baronet (1808–1903), was an English-Australian politician, explorer, pastoralist, antiquarian, philanthropist, and was a founding member of the University of Sydney. Sir John's paternal uncles were the stained glass designer Archibald Keightley Nicholson and the organist, composer, and founder of the Royal School of Church Music, Sydney Nicholson. Sir John's maternal uncle was Sydney Olivier, 1st Baron Olivier, and his cousin was the English actor Laurence Olivier.

Nicholson's father-in-law was John MacNeice (1866–1942), who was Bishop of Down, Connor and Dromore between 1934 and 1942. His brother-in-law was the poet Louis MacNeice. Nicholson and his wife, Caroline, had a childless marriage; she died in a car accident in 1981.
