= Church of St Mary the Virgin, South Benfleet =

Church in Essex, England

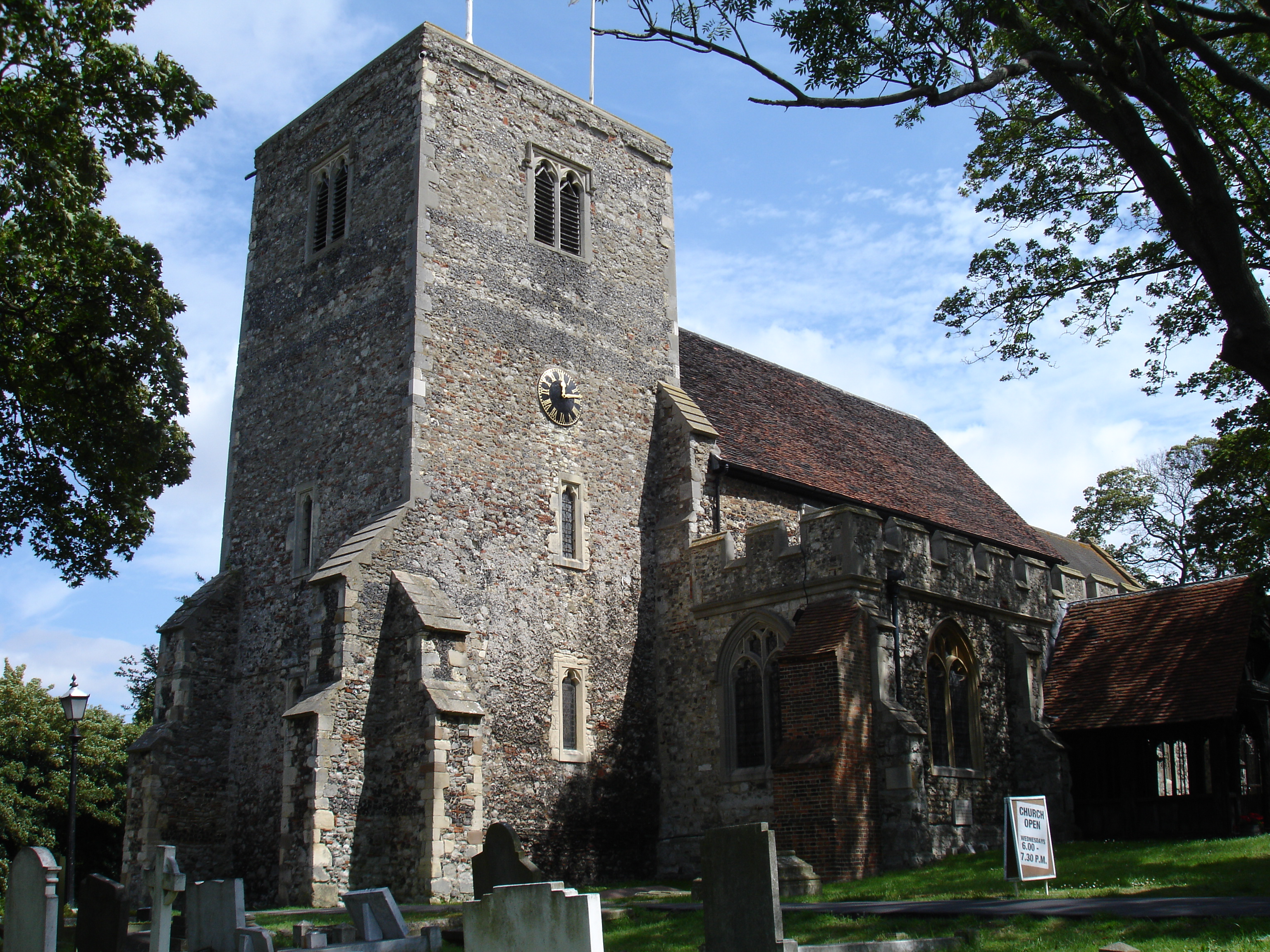
- Church of St Mary the Virgin, South Benfleet
- 51°32′46″N 0°33′48″E
- Denomination: Church of England
- Churchmanship: Anglo-Catholicism
- Website: St Mary the Virgin

History
- Dedication: Saint Mary the Virgin

Architecture
- Functional status: Parish church
- Heritage designation: Grade I
- Designated: 7 August 1952
- Architectural type: Church

Administration
- Diocese: Chelmsford
- Parish: South Benfleet

The Church of St Mary the Virgin is the parish church of South Benfleet, Essex. The church dates to around the 12th century, and predates the neighbouring Hadleigh Castle, which lies to the east a few miles away. The church was designated as a Grade I listed building in 1952.

== Architecture ==
=== Exterior ===
The oldest part is the Nave which dates to around the 12th century. Over the next 100 years, the Chancel was built; it later received various alterations and refurbishments in the 1400s. The three-stage west tower was the last stone section of the building to be built, in around the 1300s. The building has a wooden south porch which dates to the 1400s. At around the same time, the north aisle and clerestory were added. There were numerous repairs made in the 1600s and further refurbishments carried out in the 1800 and 1900s, most notably by the English architect Sir Charles Nicholson.

The stone work is predominantly ashlar, rubble, flint and has some Roman brick. The building has a central moulded hammerbeam roof with moulded, arched braces and is covered by red plain tiles. The tower has clock faces to the north and south walls.

=== Interior ===
The Chancel has a roof of four bays, and four-armed octagonal crown posts with moulded capitals and bases. There is a piscina which dates to the 1400s. Most of the stained glass dates to mainly the 1800 and 1900s and was designed by Nicholson's brother, Archibald; there is some medieval glass to the east and north-west windows. The panelling of the choir walls were designed by Sir Charles Nicholson with decoration by his mother. Nicholson also designed the traceried screen and features on it, with decoration by his daughter, Barbara. There is a font, the base of which dates to the 1200s, with a much later bowl. The pulpit is from the 1900s. The church organ was built to the designs of Nicholson's younger brother, Sidney, who later became the organist at Westminster Abbey and was the founder of the Royal School of Church Music.

== Churchyard ==
Sir Charles Nicholson, who died in 1949, is buried on the south side of the west tower in a family tomb that also contains his wives, Evelyn Louise, née Olivier, who predeceased him and who was an aunt to the actor Laurence Olivier, and Catherine Maud née Warren. Just adjacent to the church yard, at the junction of Essex Way and the High Street, is the Grade II-listed South Benfleet War Memorial, also designed by Nicholson. Other churchyard monuments include a table tomb from the 1720s which belongs to James Matthews, a local farmer and hoyman. The inscription reads "Sixty three years our Hoyman sailed merrily around. Fourty four lived parishioner where he's aground. Five wives bear him thirty three children. Enough, land another as honest before he gets off." The monument is listed at Grade II, as are a group of four, c. 1800 headstones to Catherine and Robert Hewson (d.1776); Mary Nash (d.1760); and John Greenway (d.1736). The stones are around 18 and 22 yards southeast of the south porch.

== Sources ==
- Pevsner, Nikolaus; Cherry, Bridget; O'Brien, Charles (2007). Essex. The Buildings of England. Vol. 5. London: Yale University Press.
