= South Benfleet =

Town in Essex, England

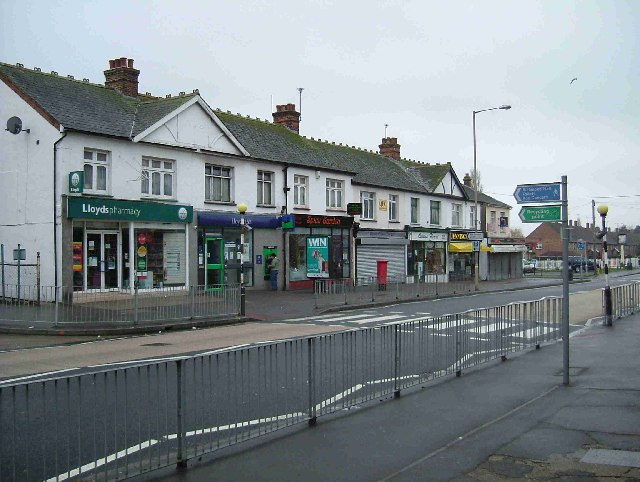
- High Road, Benfleet

- Location within Essex
- OS grid reference: TQ782860
- District: Castle Point
- Shire county: Essex
- Region: East
- Country: England
- Sovereign state: United Kingdom
- Post town: Benfleet
- Postcode district: SS7
- Dialling code: 01268
- Police: Essex
- Fire: Essex
- Ambulance: East of England
- UK Parliament: Castle Point

South Benfleet is a town in the Castle Point district of Essex, England, 30 miles east of London. It is adjacent to the village of North Benfleet. The Benfleet (SS7) post town includes South Benfleet, Thundersley, New Thundersley and Hadleigh. The Battle of Benfleet took place here between the Vikings and Saxons in 894.

The community is directly north of Canvey Island and is served by Benfleet railway station. It hosts South Benfleet Primary School, which was used temporarily to house local residents during the widespread flooding of 1953.

At the junction of Saint Mary's Church and The Anchor pub is the site of the UK's first "overrunable" mini roundabout.

== History ==
The name of the town originates from the time of the Saxon settlers in the 5th century, when the area was largely marshland. They named the area Beamfleote, meaning "tree fleet", being the area where the creeks from the River Thames adjoined the wooded area to the north. The current spelling was adopted at the time the railway service was brought to the area and a railway station built for the town. Throughout the intervening period various documented versions of the names has been 'Benfleota', 'Beamflet', 'Bemflet', 'Bienflet' and 'Bemfleet'. The last was used on John Norden's maps in the 17th century.

In Saxon times the village became known as South Benfleet when a new settlement, which became known as Little Benfleet, developed to the north of the original settlement. The new settlement did not last, and its site, which has since become known as North Benfleet, is now largely rural.

The railway was brought to the town in 1855. The new Benfleet railway station connected the town with Southend-on-Sea to the east and London Fenchurch Street station.

In July 2002, Castle Point District Council named a 6-mile cycle way, from near Benfleet railway station to near Leigh-on-Sea railway station, the "de Neumann Way" after Captain Peter de Neumann, GM.

== Battle of Benfleet ==
The Battle of Benfleet took place between the Saxons and Danish Vikings in 894. This was towards the end of the Saxon period, and the Thames and other waterways made the area vulnerable to Viking attacks. Benfleet was used as a Viking base. However, the Vikings were defeated in the battle by the army of King Alfred under the command of his son Edward the Elder and his son-in-law Earl Aethelred of Mercia. Subsequently, a church was built by the Saxons in thanksgiving for the victory over the Vikings. St Mary's is the most recent church building occupying this site and is a Grade I listed building.

In December 2008 a sculpture commemorating the battle was erected in Ferry Road, South Benfleet.

== Geography ==
=== Local towns ===
- Southend-on-Sea
- Basildon
- Pitsea
- Canvey Island
- Hadleigh
- Leigh-on-Sea
- Thundersley
- Rayleigh

== Governance ==
There are two tiers of local government covering South Benfleet, at district and non-metropolitan county level: Castle Point Borough Council, based in Thundersley, and Essex County Council, based in Chelmsford.

South Benfleet was an ancient parish in the Barstable Hundred of Essex. When elected parish and district councils were established in 1894, South Benfleet was given a parish council and included in the Rochford Rural District. In 1929 the parish and its neighbours Hadleigh and Thundersley were removed from the rural district and united to become Benfleet Urban District. The three parishes were thereafter classed as urban parishes and so were no longer eligible to have parish councils, with the lowest elected tier of local government being Benfleet Urban District Council. In 1951, South Benfleet urban parish had a population of 8,191.

Benfleet Urban District was abolished on 1 April 1974 under the Local Government Act 1972, becoming part of the new district of Castle Point. No successor parish was created for the former urban district and so Castle Point Borough Council is the lowest elected tier of local government covering South Benfleet.

== Transport ==
Benfleet railway station is served by the London, Tilbury and Southend railway line, currently run by c2c rail. By road the A13 and A12/A127/A130 connect the town to London.

=== Sadlers Farm ===
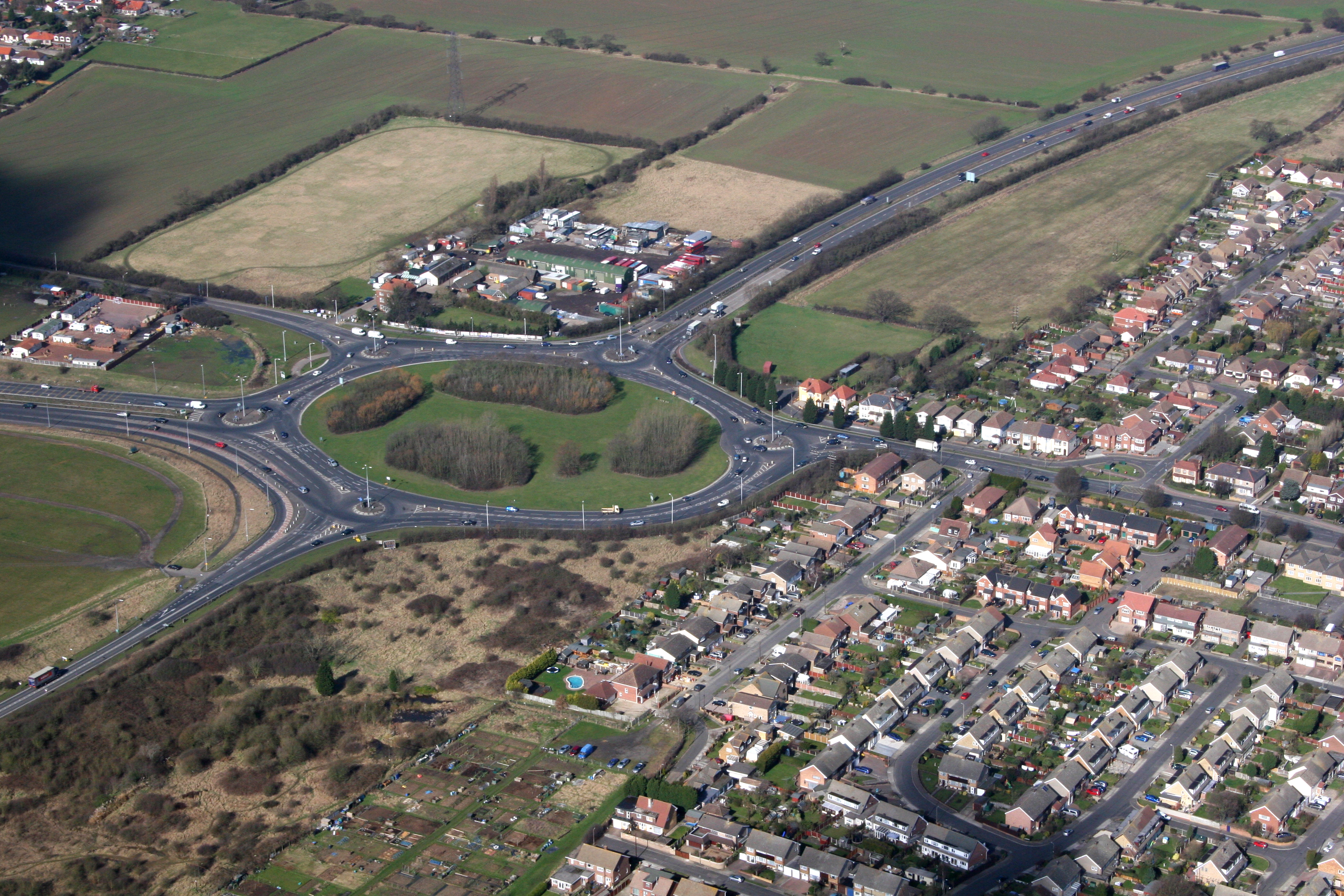
Sadlers Farm

Sadlers Farm is a traffic junction to the north-west of the town (51.567°N 0.542°E). The original Sadlers Farm junction was a roundabout commonly congested at rush hour. A £63 million improvement scheme began in 2010 and finished in 2012. The redeveloped junction included a flyover bypass for the A13 and A130, extra lanes, and redesigned roundabouts.

== Notable people ==
- Ron Martin – Southend United Chairman
- Ashley George Old the war artist is buried there
- Nicola Willis - Olympic gymnast

== Landmarks ==
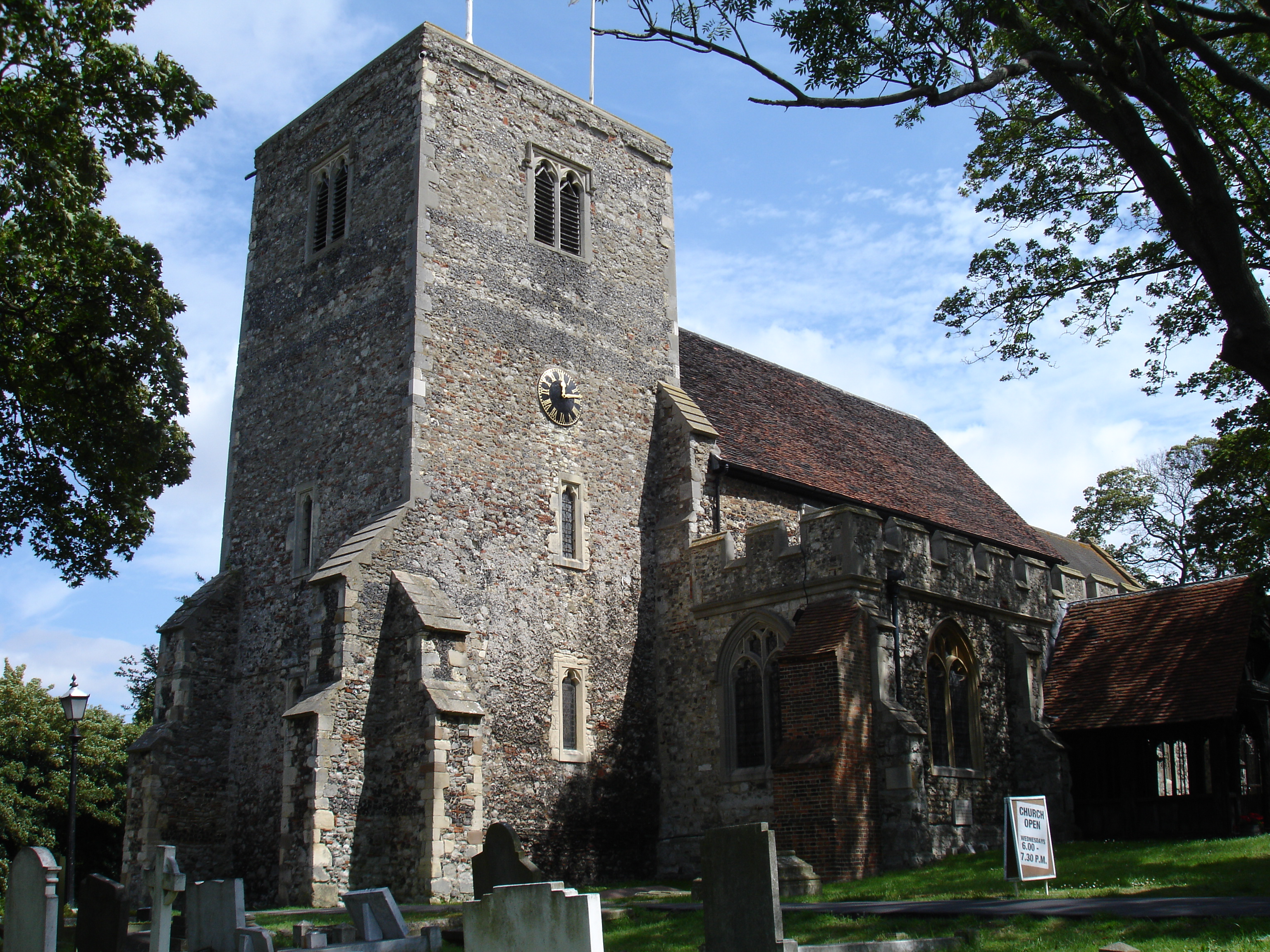
Saint Mary's Parish Church

The Church of England in Benfleet is served by the Church of St Mary the Virgin. The public houses located in the Monument and St Mary's area of the town include The Anchor, The Hoy and Helmet and the Half Crown. Further north is the Benfleet Tavern. There is also a range of restaurants in the South Benfleet conservation area.

== Sport ==
Benfleet FC are members of the Essex Olympian Football League. The First Team play in Senior Division 1 and Seconds in the Reserve Division 2. There is also a third team who compete in the Mid-Essex Division 3. The club play their home fixtures at Woodside Park Extension at the top of Manor Road. Fixtures are organised on a Saturday afternoon, with some mid-week fixtures towards the end of the season.

Benfleet is home to Sceptre League Division 1 Sunday team Benfleet FC, who finished 8th in 2010/2011 season.

Benfleet FC (Sunday) managed to win the Mike Wigget Cup in 2009/2010 season, beating Shoebury Boys 4–2 in the final at Burroughs Park, Great Wakering.

Benfleet Vikings RFC are the town's local rugby club, formed in 2013, with Senior, Youth, and Minis sides. The senior side currently compete in the Shepherd Neame Essex Merit League 6 East and play their home fixtures on Saturdays at Richmond Park, off of Brook Road.

Benfleet is also home to South Benfleet United F.C., a football club formed in 1978 for youth football but is now a men's and veterans' (over 35s) club. Their men's team currently play in the Sceptre League and their veterans teams are in the Premier Division and Division 3 of the Southend Borough Combination Veterans League.

Benfleet Cricket Club (established 1948) currently play their home matches at Woodside Park at the top of Manor Road. Members of the Hambro Financial Cricket League (formerly Shepherd Neame Essex League), they currently field five adult teams on a Saturday, two adult teams on a Sunday, and teams at u9, u11, u13 and u15 age groups in competitions organised by the South Essex Cricket Participation Group.

== In popular culture ==
Benfleet was referred to as Beamfleot in The Saxon Stories by Bernard Cornwell.

== Images ==
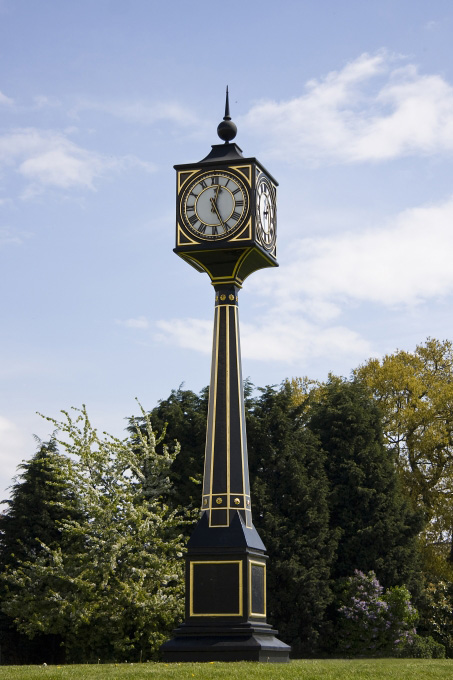
Clock on Vic House roundabout

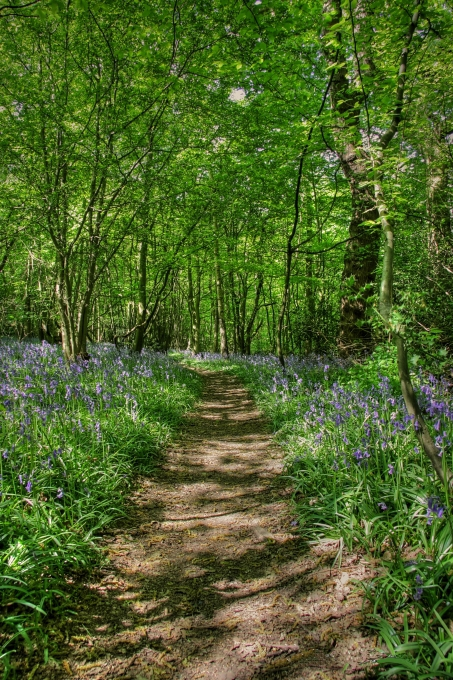
One of the last true Bluebell woods in Essex (Shipwrights Drive)

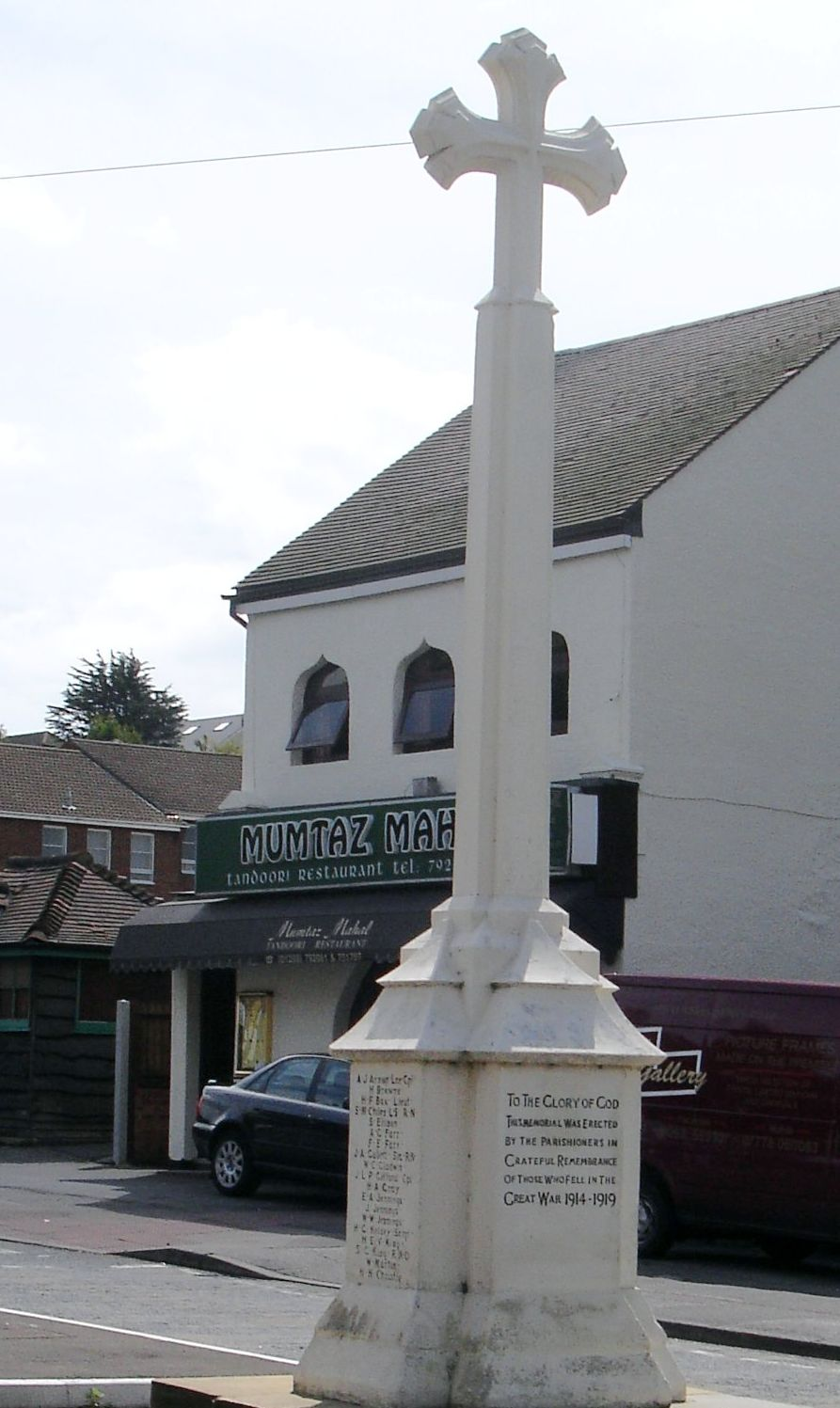
War Monument, South Benfleet

== See also ==
- North Benfleet
