= Burton (near Neston) =

Village in Cheshire, England

Coordinates: 53.260°N 3.025°W

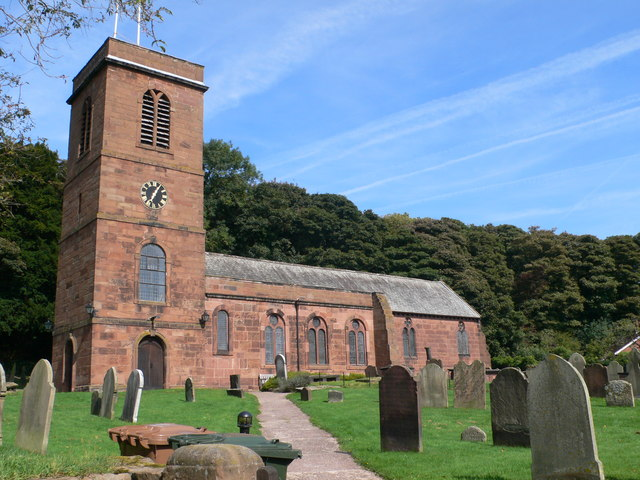
- St Nicholas' Church, Burton

- Location within Cheshire
- Population: 715 (2001 Census)
- OS grid reference: SJ316741
- Unitary authority: Cheshire West and Chester
- Ceremonial county: Cheshire
- Region: North West
- Country: England
- Sovereign state: United Kingdom
- Post town: NESTON
- Postcode district: CH64
- Dialling code: 0151
- Police: Cheshire
- Fire: Cheshire
- Ambulance: North West
- UK Parliament: Chester North and Neston

Burton is a village on the Wirral Peninsula, in the unitary authority of Cheshire West and Chester and the ceremonial county of Cheshire, England. It is situated south of the town of Neston.

At the 2001 Census, the settlement constituted part of the Burton and Ness Ward of the Borough of Ellesmere Port and Neston. The population of the village was 715 with the ward having a total population of 1,620. As of 2025 Burton is part of Willaston and Thornton Ward.

== History ==
The village population was recorded at 288 in 1801, 291 in 1851, 222 in 1901 and 667 in 1951. The Cheshire and Chester Record Office has records of baptisms, marriages and burials at the parish church, St Nicholas', dating from 1538.

=== Ancient ===
Burton was first documented in the Domesday Book and historically was on the route which travellers would take from London to Birkenhead. Owing to its location on trade routes, it is thought to have developed at a faster rate than neighbouring communities. Indeed, during the fourteenth century trade and travel allowed Burton to flourish, standing as it did near the site of embarcation for the ferry to North Wales and on the main route to the city of Chester. However, the build up of silt in the River Dee led to a decrease in shipping trade, and Burton's prosperity took a downturn when the river course was diverted in the eighteenth century.

=== Modern ===
In recent years Burton has become a quiet 'picture postcard' village much sought after on the property market. In 2001 the village of Burton was ranked eighth overall in a UK market research survey of so-called 'super rich' communities by Philip Beresford of the Sunday Times Rich List, with millionaires making up 16% of the population in its postal district.

== Landmarks ==
The village is the location of Burton Manor, formerly a residential adult education college operated by Liverpool City Council and refurbished in 2022 to be used by a local business. Just to the south of Burton is the RSPB's Burton Mere Wetlands reserve.

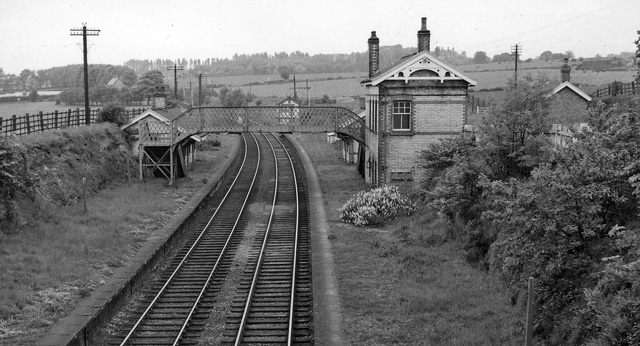
Burton Point railway station in 1961

Burton had an operational railway station, Burton Point, on the Borderlands Line, from 1889 until 1955. Services were to Wrexham and Seacombe. The station's position, some distance from village, led to a decline in usage as cars became common in the 1950s. The site is still almost entirely intact, the station buildings currently forming part of a garden centre. The line is proposed to be incorporated into Merseyrail, running right into the underground section of Liverpool's city centre.

== Transport ==
Public buses serving Burton from 2017:

Number	Route	Operator	Days of operation
274	Neston High School – Ellesmere Port	Aintree Coachlines	One journey this direction only (Monday to Friday: schooldays only)
W1	Willaston – Caldy Grammar School/West Kirby Grammar School	Happy Al's	One journey each way (Monday to Friday: schooldays only)
22A	Chester - West Kirby	Happy Al's	Five journeys in each direction (Monday to Saturday from 30 June 2025)

== Notable people ==
Burton is the birthplace of Bishop Thomas Wilson (1663–1755), Bishop of Sodor and Man. The popular BBC radio broadcaster John Peel grew up in the village, having been born in Heswall.

== See also ==
- Listed buildings in Burton (near Neston)
- St Nicholas' Church, Burton
