= Burton Manor =

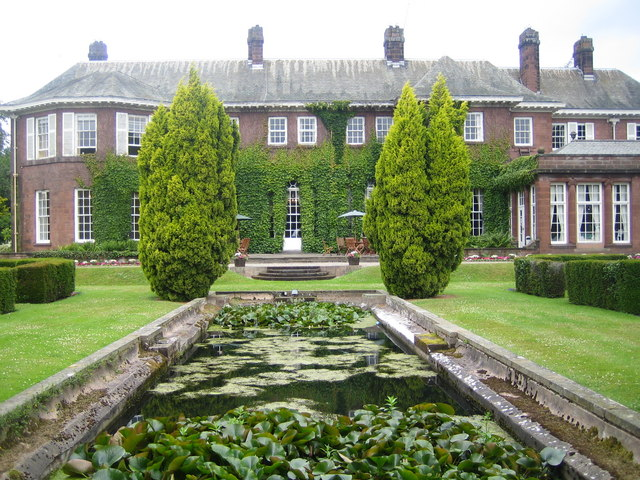
- Burton Manor from the garden with the orangery on the right

- Location in Cheshire
- 53.2596°N 3.0285°W
- OS grid reference: SJ 315,741

History
- Built: c. 1805
- Built for: Richard Congreve

Site notes
- Architect: Sir Charles Nicholson (restoration)
- Restored: 1904
- Restored by: Henry Neville Gladstone

Listed Building – Grade II
- Designated: 22 March 1974
- Reference no.: 1387802

Burton Manor is a former manor house in the village of Burton, Cheshire, England. It is recorded in the National Heritage List for England as a designated Grade II listed building. At one time an adult education college, this is now closed, but the walled garden is open to the public and is administered by the Friends of Burton Manor Gardens.

== History ==
The house was built around 1805 for Richard Congreve and remodelled in 1904 by Sir Charles Nicholson for Henry Neville Gladstone, son of William Ewart Gladstone. An orangery was added in 1910 to a design by Arthur Beresford Pite. Formerly a private house, it became an adult education college with accommodation for resident students, operated by Liverpool City Council.It closed as an adult educational college in March 2011. Since its closure the organisation known as the Friends of Burton Manor has been formed to restore the manor and its associated buildings. The walled garden is open to the public and is maintained by the Friends of Burton Manor Gardens.

In 2022 the house was refurbished in keeping with its listed status and is now home to a recruitment business. 16 new houses have been built in its grounds. The Friends of Burton Manor still maintain the outer gardens, which remain open to the public.

== Architecture ==
The house is built in ashlar and hammer-dressed red sandstone with a roof of green slates. The chimney stacks are tall and ornate, built of stone and brick. The plan of the building is quadrangular with a central courtyard. The authors of the Buildings of England series consider it to be a "classical design of no great force" and state that its most attractive feature is the small inner courtyard.

== External features ==
The former coach house is listed at Grade II, as are the boundary walls, gate piers and library.

== Garden ==
The garden was designed in the early 20th century as a formal garden. It was designed by T. H. Mawson with a pool, lawns, and terraces with views over extensive parkland. It is listed Grade II on the National Register of Historic Parks and Gardens. The ice house in the garden is listed at Grade II, and is a scheduled monument.

== See also ==
- Listed buildings in Burton, Neston, Cheshire
