= Pound Wood =

Nature reserve in Daws Heath, Essex, England

Coordinates: 51.5688°N 0.6189°E

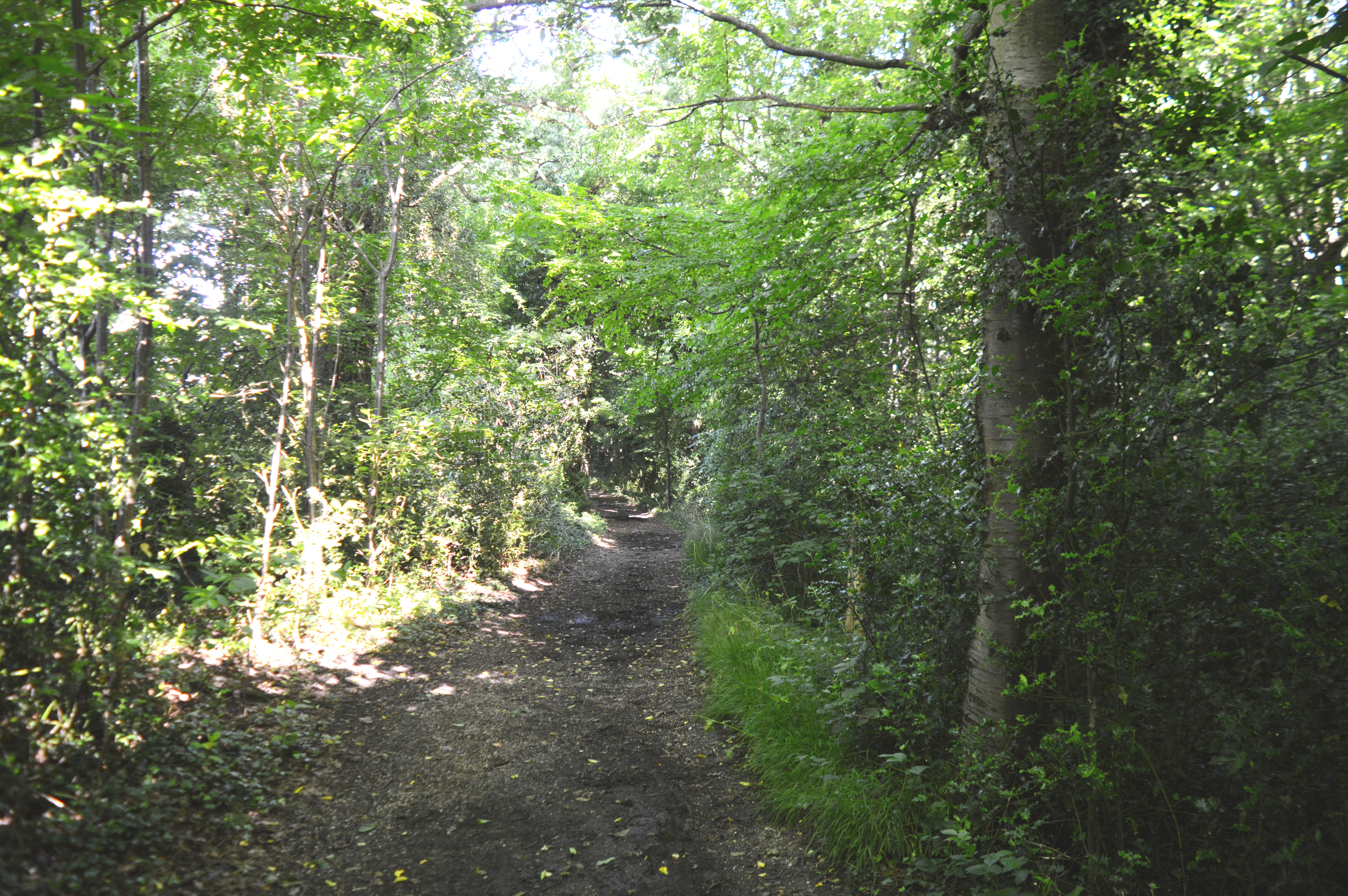

Pound Wood is a 22.3 nature reserve in Daws Heath in Essex. It is owned and managed by the Essex Wildlife Trust.

Much of this site is ancient woodland, with some old secondary woodland. Trees include sweet chestnut, aspen and the wild service tree. There are a number of dells and ponds.

There is access from St Michael's Road, which separates the site from Tile Wood, another Essex Wildlife Trust nature reserve.
