= Little Haven Nature Reserve =

Nature reserve in Essex, England

Coordinates: 51.5709°N 0.60749°E

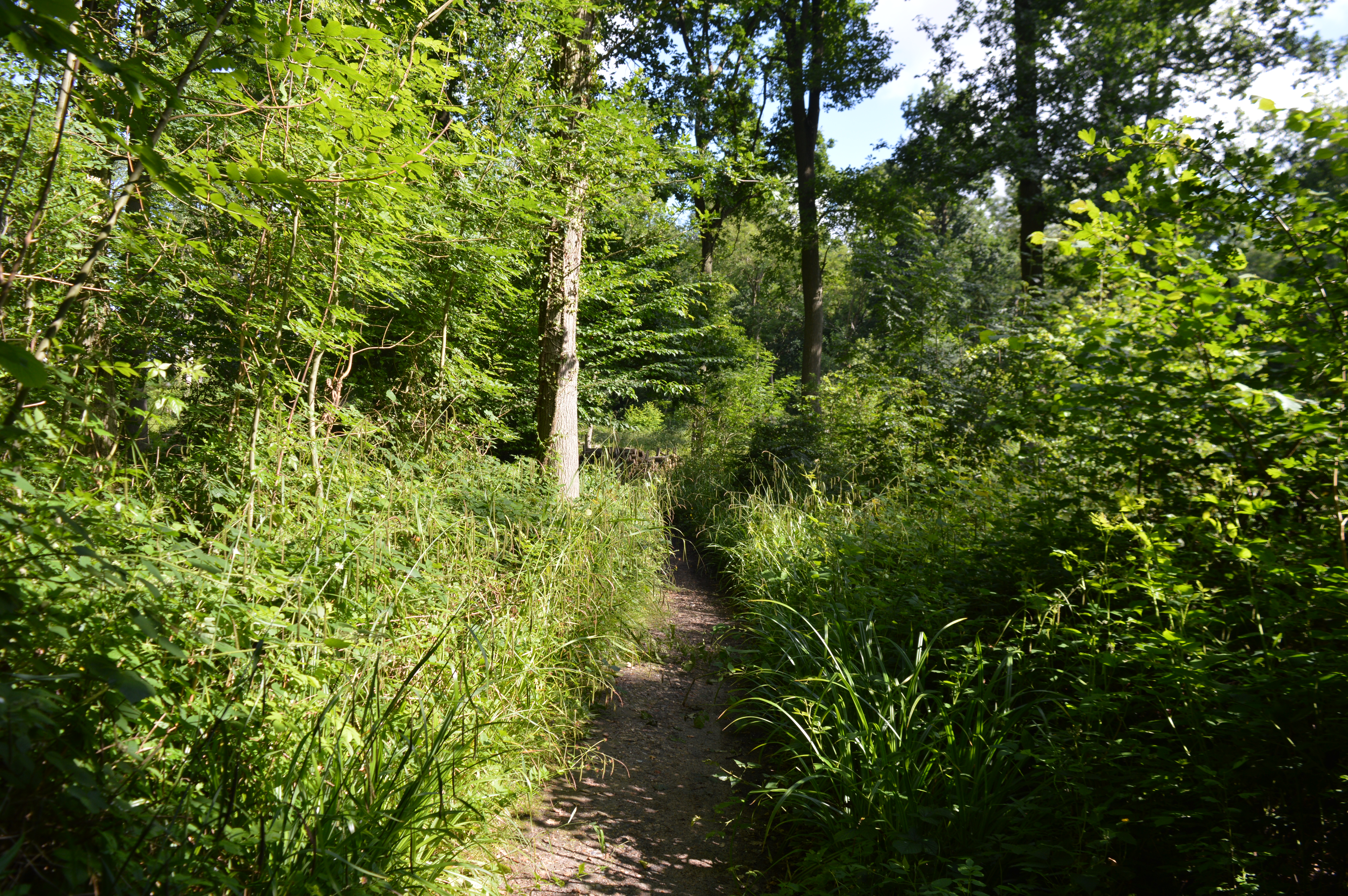
- Interactive map of Little Haven Nature Reserve
- Type: Nature reserve
- Location: Thundersley, Essex
- OS grid: TQ 808 890
- Area: 37.2 hectares (92 acres)
- Manager: Essex Wildlife Trust

Little Haven is a 37.2-hectare (92-acre) nature reserve in Thundersley in Essex, England. It is owned by the Little Haven's Children's Hospice, and leased to the Essex Wildlife Trust (EWT).

This site has diverse habitats of woodland, meadows, scrub and hedges. The main trees are sessile oaks, hornbeams and sweet chestnut, and plants such as wood sorrel and are indicators of ancient woodland. The hedges provide nesting sites for migrating birds such as whitethroats.

There is access to the site by a footpath from St Michael's Road through Tile Wood, a neighbouring EWT nature reserve.
