= Great Wood and Dodd's Grove =

Nature reserve in Essex, England

Coordinates: 51.559°N 0.623°E

- Site of Special Scientific Interest
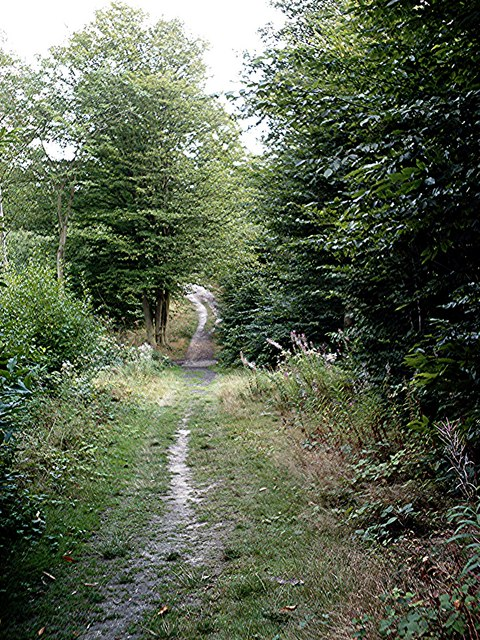
- Location of Great Wood and Dodd's Grove.
- Area of search: Essex
- Grid reference: TQ819877
- Interest: Biological
- Area: 36.8 ha (91 acres)
- Notification date: 1985
- Location map: Magic Map

Great Wood and Dodd's Grove is a 36.8-hectare (91-acre) biological Site of Special Scientific Interest in Leigh-on-Sea in Essex. It is also a Local Nature Reserve called Belfairs. Essex Wildlife Trust runs the Belfairs Woodland Centre and manages the site together with Southend-on-Sea City Council.

This is a small remnant of the ancient Hadleigh Great Wood. It is coppiced oak woodland on sands, gravels and clay, and one of the largest areas of old woodland in the south of the county. Bramble and honeysuckle are the main ground plants. Other plants include the rare broad-leaved helleborine. Hadleigh Woods comprise several contiguous woods: Belfairs Wood (32.3 ha); Coxall Wood (0.79 ha); Dodd's Grove (4.02 ha); and Hadleigh Great Wood (33.3 ha).

The site has toilets, a café and trails.

There is access from Poors Lane, which runs through the site and separates Hadleigh Great Wood from Dodd's Grove.

== See also ==
- Hockley woods
- Daws Heath
- Prittle Brook
