= Tile Wood =

Nature reserve in Daws Heath, Essex, England

Coordinates: 51.5688°N 0.6189°E

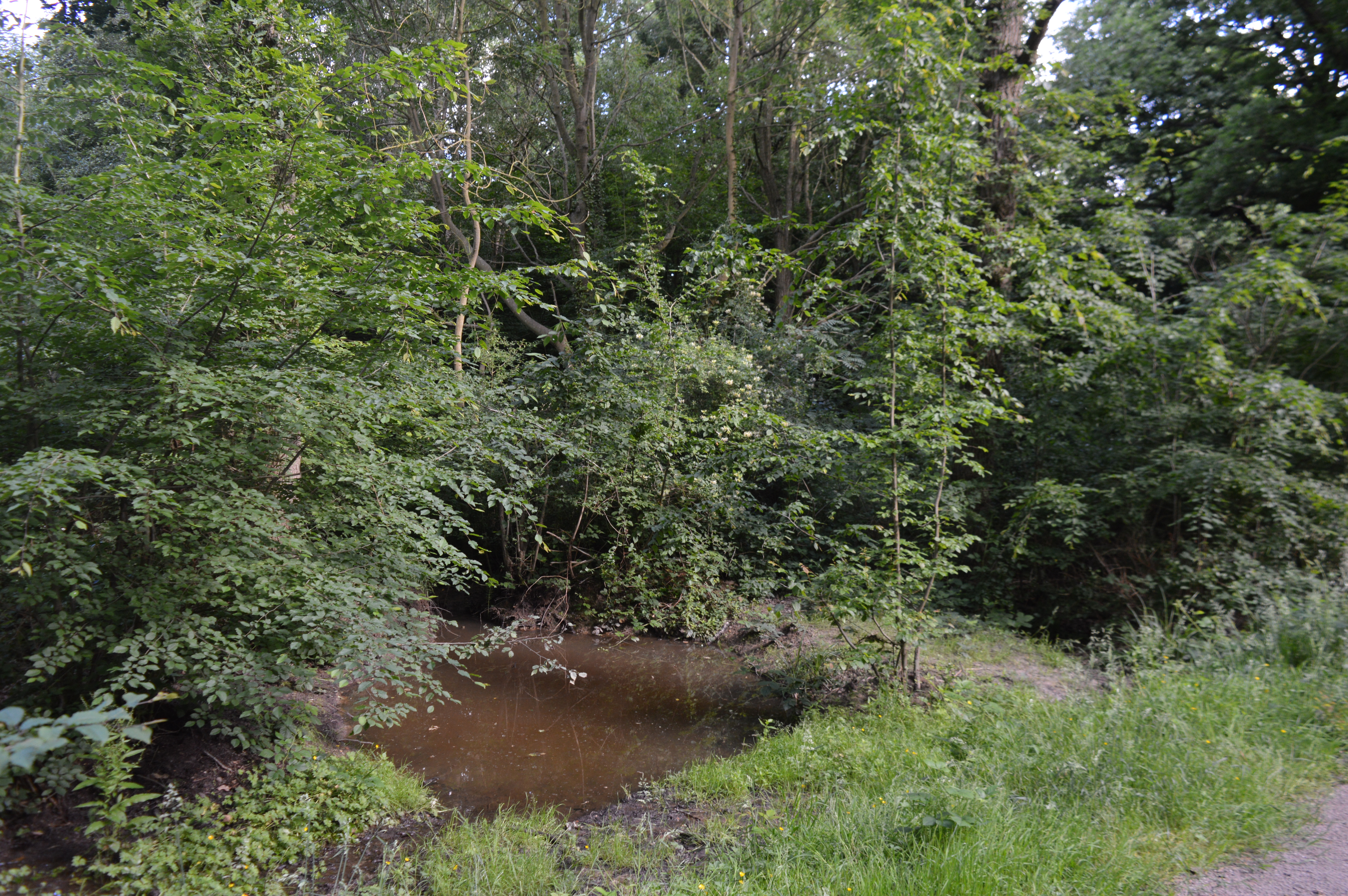
- Interactive map of Tile Wood
- Type: Nature reserve
- Location: Daws Heath, Essex
- OS grid: TQ 816 890
- Area: 6.5 hectares (16 acres)
- Manager: Essex Wildlife Trust

Tile Wood is a 6.5-hectare (16-acre) nature reserve in Daws Heath in Essex. It is managed by the Essex Wildlife Trust.

The wood is ancient, having been mentioned in the Anglo-Saxon period. The main trees are sessile oak, hornbeam and sweet chestnut. Ground flora include wood sorrel, bluebells and wood-rush.

There is access from St Michael's Road, and the site is adjacent to two other nature reserves managed by the Essex Wildlife Trust, Little Haven and Pound Wood.
