= Daws Heath =

Hamlet in Essex, England

Coordinates: 51.565°N 0.612°E

Daws Heath is a hamlet in the Castle Point near Southend-on-Sea in Essex, England.

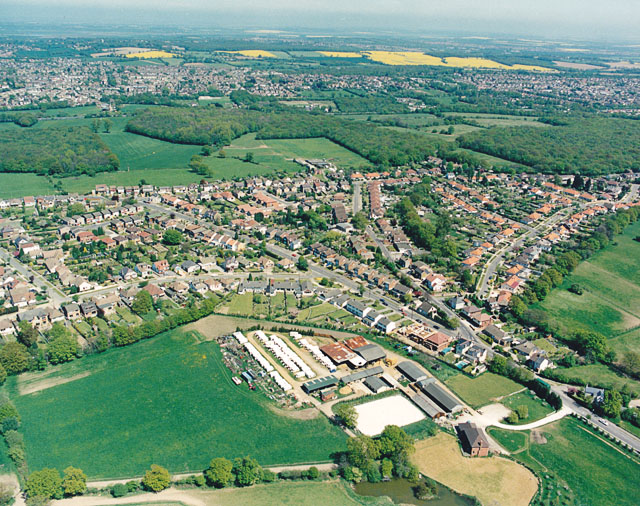
Aerial view of Daws Heath estate and the woods beyond.

Daws Heath extends from the north side of Hadleigh towards the A127 London-Southend arterial road, and from where it adjoins Thundersley at the west end of Daws Heath Road eastwards to Belfairs Park, Leigh-on-Sea in Southend borough. It is traversed by the Daws Heath Road and St Michael's Road.

== History ==
Daws Heath was described in books as a "wild and lawless place: both travellers and local inhabitants had to endure thieves and highwaymen," (Thundersley - A Pictorial History by Terry Babbington) and "a hotbed of lawlessness right down to living memory." (Southend-on-Sea & District by J.W.Burrows, dated 1909). Burrows continued......"The settlement of this...district is attributed to some discharged soldiers who served in the Peninsular War. Upon the heath land they built themselves small huts, and by some means or another managed to obtain a precarious livelihood. Here possibly smuggled goods were concealed until a favourable opportunity enabled the owners to dispatch them to London or through the bye roads into the centre of England." Charcoal burning was an important industry here in the 16th century, supplying gunpowder factories. This probably included the Waltham Abbey Royal Gunpowder Mills which produced gunpowder from 1660. More recently the Essex Wildlife Trust has revived charcoal burning in Pound Wood. The Wildlife Trust has done much work in Pound Wood and Tile Wood/Starvelarks Wood (next to Little Haven Children's Hospice), making them more accessible to visitors.

The artist Alan Sorrell was a resident of Daws Heath.

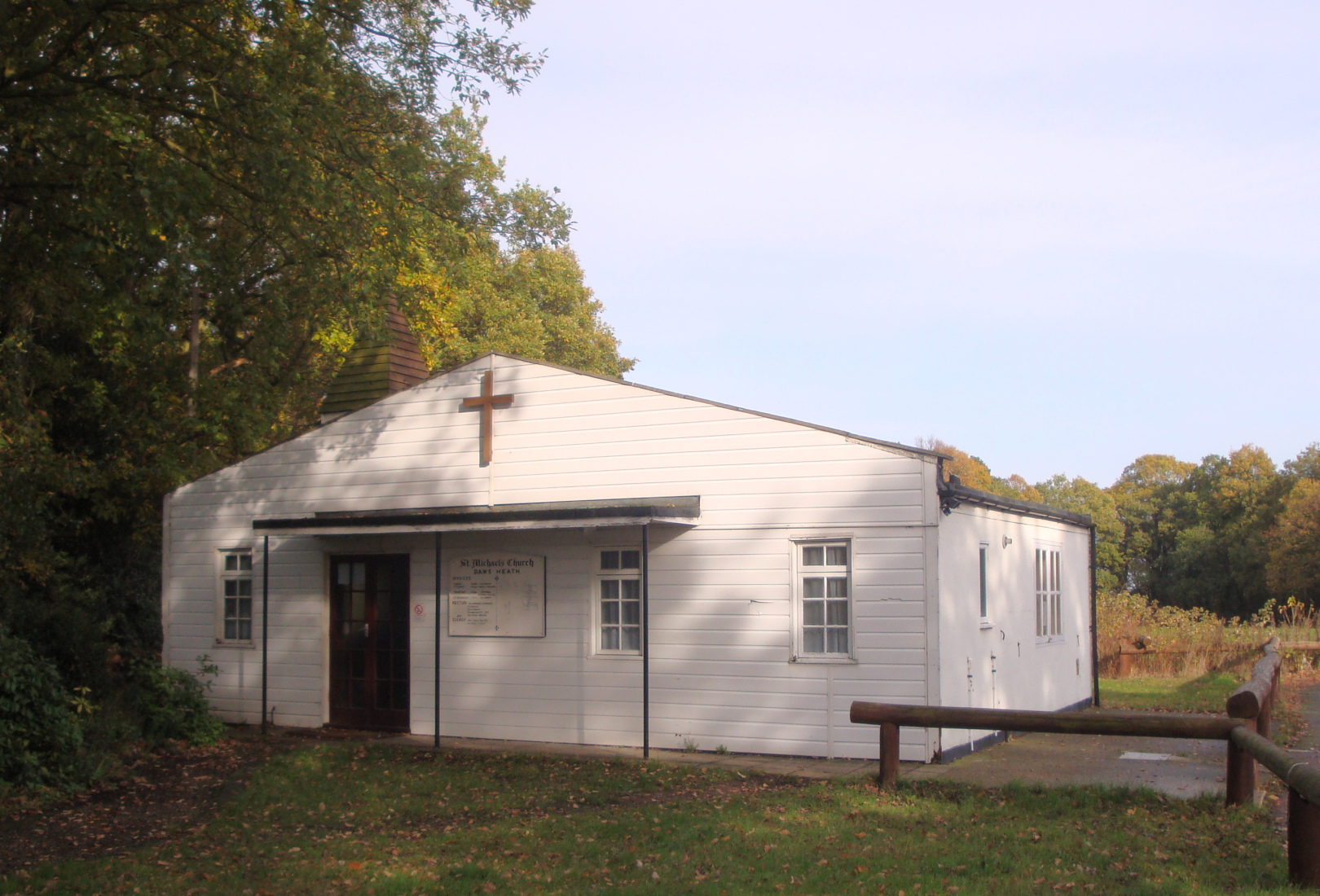
St Michael's Church, Daws Heath, Thundersley. Pictured in 2009 before demolition in 2012

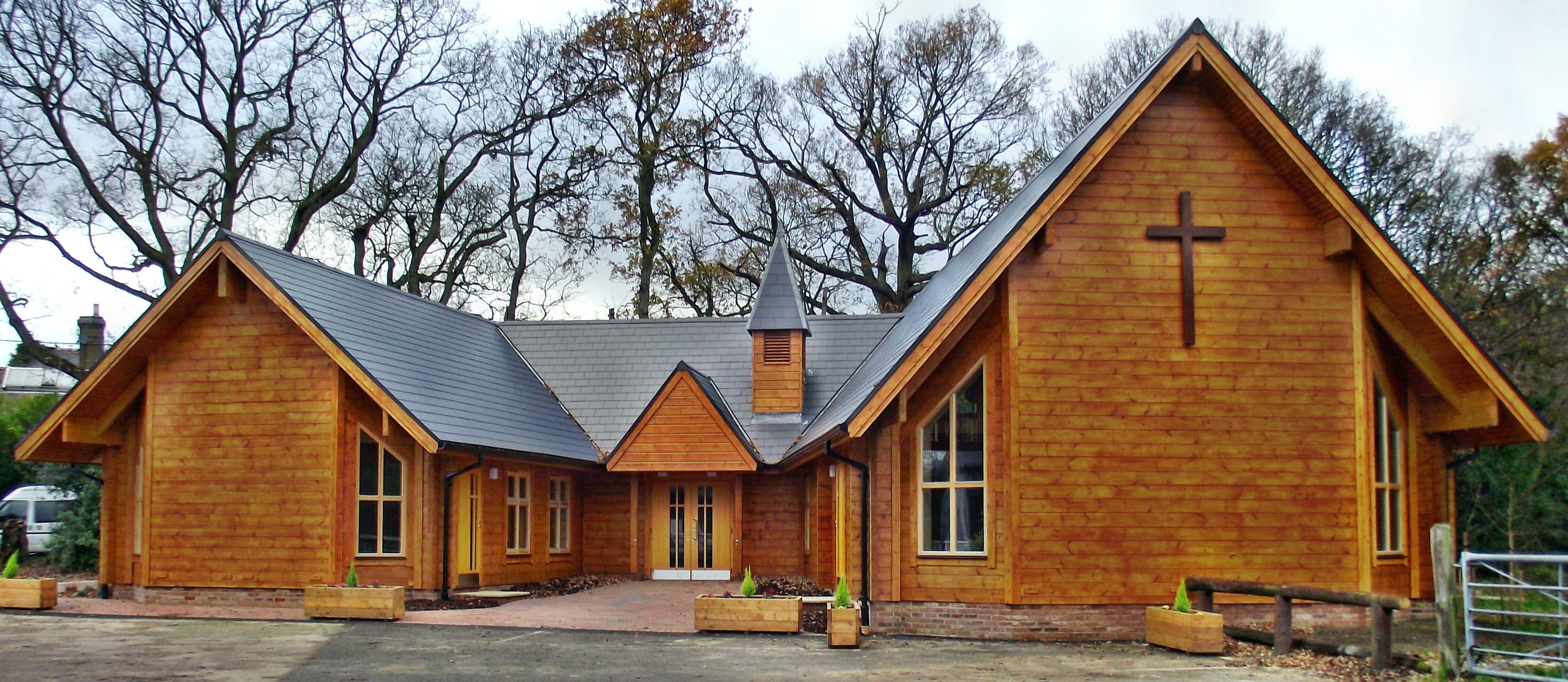
The New Church of St Michael & All Angels Daws Heath

== Woods of Daws Heath ==
The woodlands of Daws Heath include the following named woods.

Pound Wood (OS Grid Reference TQ820887) lies to the north of Bramble Road and spans the parishes of Thundersley and Hadleigh. It is a 54.0 acre (21.85 hectare) coppice wood with standard Oaks, mainly Sessile but some Pedunculate. Coppice trees include Willow, Hornbeam and Chestnut. Other species include Holly, Birch, Wild Service, Woodrushes, Wood spurge and Bluebells. Two small streams run in a south-west to north-east direction. The wood was purchased by Essex Wildlife Trust in 1993.

Rag Wood (TQ806887) is a small, 3.7 acre (1.50 hectare), privately owned wood located to the north-east of West Wood and south-west of Valerie Wells Wood. It comprises mainly Oak with some Chestnut and Hornbeam. It is a secondary wood, perhaps of the early 19th century.

Starvelarks Wood is divided into two contiguous woods by a track running north to south. Starvelarks Wood East (TQ810892) is an 8.03 acres (3.25 hectare) wood, and Starvelarks Wood West (TQ811891) is 10.6 acres (4.29 hectare). Both woods are mainly Chestnut coppice with some Ash and Birch, unusually for woods in the area there is very little Hornbeam. Both woods are thought to be 19th century plantations. Starvelarks wood is part of the Essex Wildlife Trust's Little Havens Nature Reserve.

Tile Wood is divided into two woods: Tile Wood East (TQ816890) is a 17.4 acres (7.04 hectare) wood and was formerly known from Anglo-Saxon records as Tilhurst. St Michaels Road forms the eastern boundary of the East wood. The wood is mainly Hornbeam coppice with standard Oaks. Tile Wood West (TQ815892) is 17.6 acres (7.12 hectare) and is also known as Wyburns Wood, Lower Wyburns Farm is located to the north of the wood but now separated from it by the A127 road. Tile Wood West comprises principally Ash with some Alder, Chestnut and Hazel. Both woods are owned by the Church Commissioners.

Valerie Wells Wood (TQ808887), formerly known as Cottage Plantation, is located to the north-east of West Wood, Daws Heath Road forms the wood's northern boundary. It is 14.1 acre (5.71 hectare) wood of predominately Chestnut coppice. There are some Pines, Poplar and Beeches, these are uncommon species in south-east Essex, and indicate that the wood originated as a plantation. The wood was purchased from a private owner by the Essex Wildlife Trust in 2013.

West Wood (TQ805881) is a 79.4 acre (32.13 hectare) wood that straddles the parishes of Thundersley and Hadleigh. The wood abuts Rayleigh Road (A129) on its south-west corner. The wood can be accessed from Rayleigh Road, Hedge Lane, Westborough Close, and Daws Heath Road. The Prittle Brook runs west to east through the wood. To the south of the brook, trees are mainly Hornbeam and Oak. To the north, Chestnut predominates with some Hornbeam, Oak and Birch. A Luftwaffe photograph of 1940 shows the whole of the wood north of the brook had been clear-felled and was in different stages of re-growth. West Wood is owned by Castle Point District Council and is currently managed by Castle Point Wildlife Group. The wood was formerly owned by the Dean and Chapter of St. Paul's Cathedral. The Prittle brook was partly culverted to the east of the wood, and contained within concrete embankments following flooding of the brook and Daws Heath Road in 1968.

The 5.5 mile (8.9 km) Seven Woods Walk includes the woods of Daws Heath plus Hadleigh Great Wood and Belfairs Wood.

== See also ==
- Great Wood and Dodds Grove
- Hockley Woods
- Prittle Brook
