= Hadleigh Farm =

Farm and cross-country cycling venue

Coordinates: 51.54387°N 0.60883°E

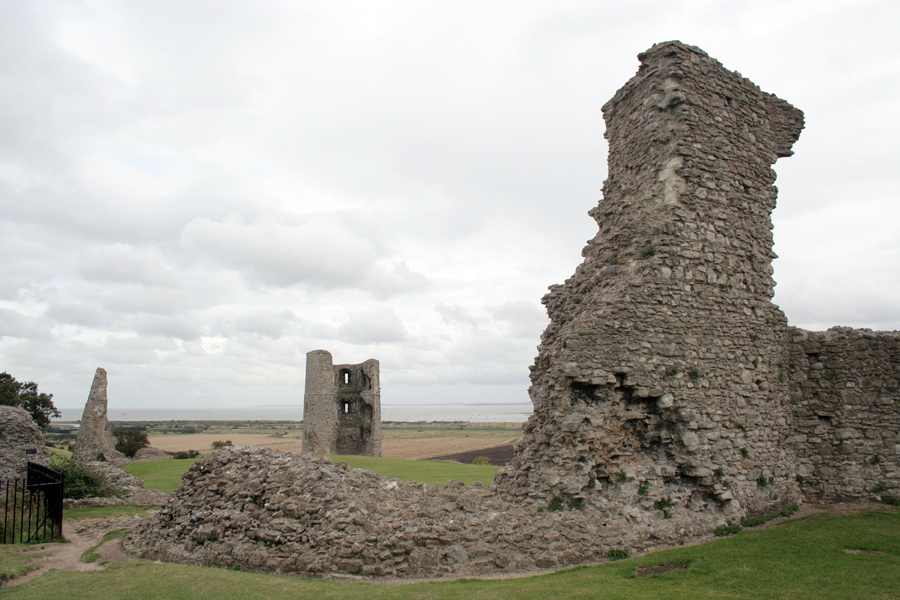
The remains of Hadleigh Castle, overlooking Hadleigh Farm

Hadleigh Farm is an educational working farm and cross-country cycling venue located in Hadleigh, within the borough of Castle Point, in the county of Essex. The men's and women's mountain biking events of the 2012 Summer Olympics took place at Hadleigh Farm on 11 and 12 August.

== Site ==
Hadleigh Farm is owned by the Salvation Army and run as an educational working farm. It features a rare breeds centre and tea room for visitors. The 700-acre (2.8 km^{2}) farm was purchased in 1891 by William Booth as part of a plan to rescue the destitute from the squalor of London.

Hadleigh Farm overlooks the Thames Estuary to the south and adjoins Hadleigh Castle, built in the 1230s during the reign of King Henry III, and one of the most important late-medieval castles in Essex, now preserved by English Heritage as a Grade I listed building. A portion of the mountain bike course for the 2012 Olympic and Paralympic Games crosses the adjacent Hadleigh Country Park, owned and managed by Essex County Council and a Site of Special Scientific Interest with special regard for invertebrates.

== 2012 Summer Olympics ==
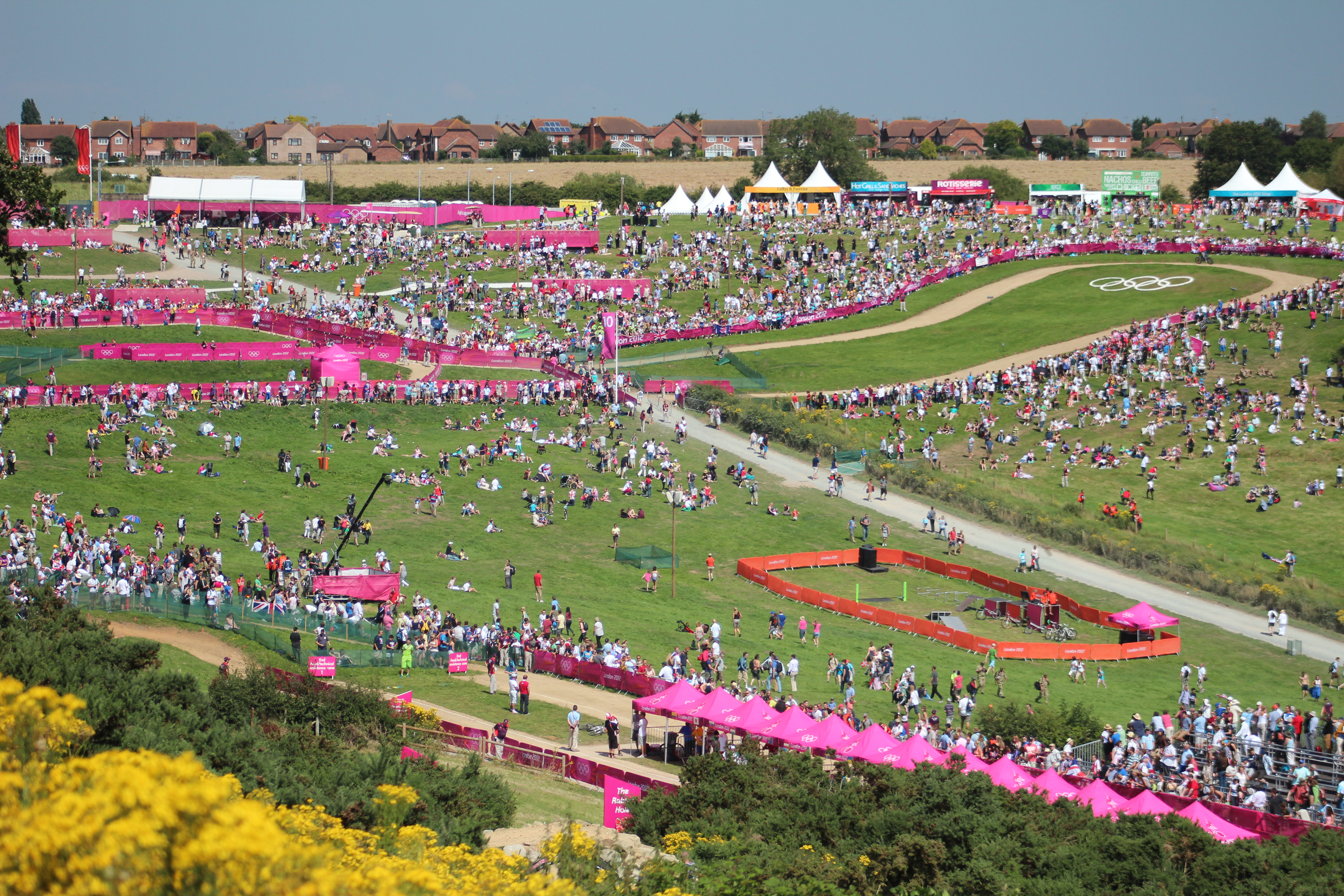
Lower parts of the Hadleigh Farm venue during the Olympics, on the day of the women's cross-country cycling.

Hadleigh Farm was confirmed in 2008 as the venue for the mountain biking competitions of the cycling programme of the 2012 Summer Olympics. The original proposed venue at Weald Country Park had been deemed insufficiently challenging by the UCI, who were described as being delighted with Hadleigh.

Temporary grandstands seating up to 3,000 people were erected for the Olympics. Following the Olympics the course was adapted for use by the general public, with a new bike shop, cafe, and workshop and broader facilities for the farm. A new mountain bike club based at the farm has been founded and the course has been used for events including the British National Mountain Bike Championships.

== Transport ==
Plans for improving access to the site for the Olympics included the widening of Castle Lane and Chapel Lane in Hadleigh. The site is approximately 5 miles (8 km) from London Southend Airport. Hadleigh Farm lies along the London, Tilbury and Southend line between Benfleet and Leigh-on-Sea railway stations.
