= Hockley Woods =

Nature reserve in Essex, England

Coordinates: 51.594°N 0.643°E

- Site of Special Scientific Interest
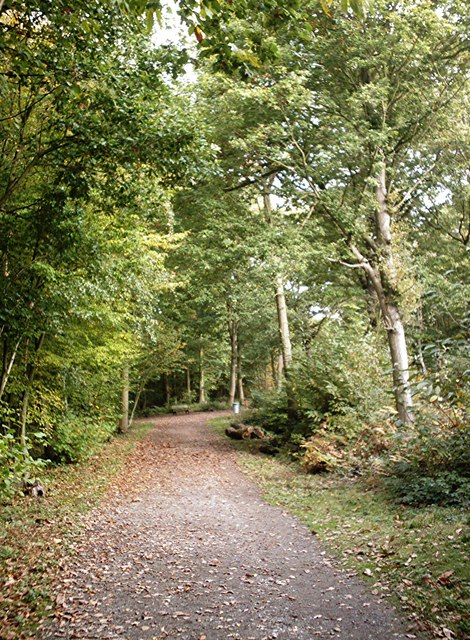
- Location of Hockley Woods.
- Area of search: Essex
- Grid reference: TQ 833917
- Interest: Biological
- Area: 91.3 ha (226 acres)
- Notification date: 1986
- Location map: Magic Map

Hockley Woods is a large woodland in south-east Essex. It is a Local Nature Reserve, and parts are a Site of Special Scientific Interest. It is owned and managed by Rochford District Council.

Hockley Woods are the largest residual area of the wildwood, which covered much of Essex after the Ice Age, 10,000 years ago. Hockley Woods comprise several contiguous named woods including Great Bull Wood (30.2 ha), Great Hawkwell Wood (44.1 ha), Beeches or Beaches Wood (25.0 ha), Winks Wood (1.1 ha), Little Bull Wood (1.51 ha), Whitbred's Wood (3.57 ha) and Parson's Snipe (3.67 ha). Note that none of the woods is called Hockley wood. The woods extend over parts of the parishes of Hockley, Hawkwell and Rayleigh. The size of the woods is variously given as 130 hectares, 109 hectares and 91.3 hectares, although the latter is the SSSI only. Trees have recently (2022) been planted in the arable field to the south of Parson' s Snipe

The woods are on pre-glacial gravels and clay. The wooded areas are an intricate mosaic of various trees, every species developing under appropriate conditions. Oak and sweet chestnut develop on the higher ground, birch on the most acidic soils, hornbeam on the wet soils, willow and hazel along the streams. Other trees include pedunculate oak, sessile oak and birch. Ground flora include three species of orchid, and there is a stream and area of bog. Other species include the wild service tree, wood anemone, wood spurge and cow wheat that develop on the undisturbed soils of old woods. The protected heath fritillary butterfly is common on the site.

Hockley Woods are coppiced and used for timber. It is also the location for Hockley Woods parkrun, a free, weekly, timed 5km running event held every Saturday at 9 am.

Access to the wooded areas is unrestricted. There is a bus stop on Main Road (SS5 4RN) and a car park. The site has public toilets.

== Other woods in Hockley ==
Other isolated woods within the parish of Hockley are as follows.

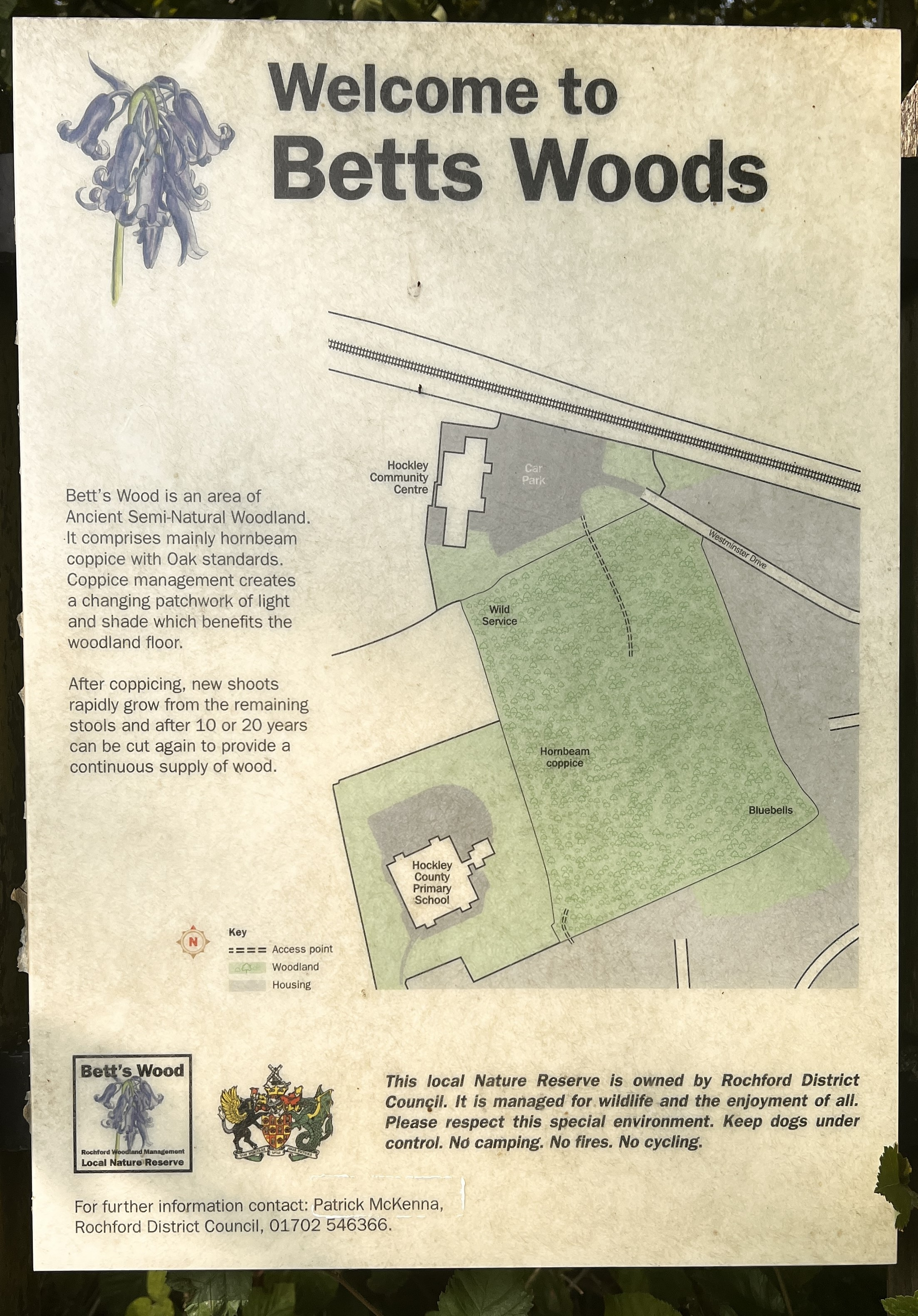
Information Board for Betts Wood

Betts Wood (Ordnance Survey Reference TQ834929), 2.97 hectares, is a rectangular wood principally comprising coppiced Hornbeam and standard Oak with Ash, Hazel and Elm. Ground vegetation consists mainly of brambles. The wood is a public open space bordered by housing, a school and a community centre car park. To the west an abandoned field is now a Hornbeam and Oak wood.

Blounts Wood (TQ818929), 3.21 hectares, is a rectangular wood principally comprising Hornbeam, Ash and Hazel. It has a rich flora including Wild Service, Crab Apple, and hart's tongue fern. The Shenfield to Southend Railway forms the southern boundary of the wood.

Crabtree Wood (TQ833935), 1.55 hectares, a Hornbeam wood around a small steep valley. A large wood bank marks the boundary with Hockley Hall Wood. The flora is quite poor, although bluebells are abundant.

Folly Wood (TQ832926), 2.54 hectares, is a rectangular wood of pure Hornbeam and is densely shaded and brambles are abundant. It has a few Oaks. Its boundaries comprise housing and an arable field.

Hockley Hall Wood (TQ831935),12.59 hectares and the detached Hockley Hall Wood South (TQ830930), 0.3 hectares. Hockley Hall Wood is a scarp wood mainly comprising Hornbeam, with some Ash and Hawthorn (Crataegus monogyna). It has a rich flora and is much shaded and with an acid soil, the grass Milium effusum is in profusion. Hockley Hall Wood is privately owned although a public footpath runs through the wood in an East-West direction. Hockley Hall Wood South became detached from Hockley Hall Wood with the construction of the Shenfield to Southend railway in 1888. It has the typical structure of an Oak-Hornbeam wood. It has a rich flora including Wild Service, broom, brambles and bluebells. The railway forms the northern boundary and an arable field the other boundaries.

Marylands Wood (TQ837930), 4.79 hectares, is a rectangular Hornbeam wood, with Ash, Maple, Willow and Hawthorn. It has abundant flora including Wild Service, bluebell, and three species of orchid. The railway forms the southern boundary, and housing the eastern boundary. Marylands Wood is distinct from Marylands Nature Reserve (TQ839933).

Plumberow Wood (TQ839940), 5.22 hectares, is a privately owned scarp wood with less Hornbeam than neighbouring woods. Timber trees are mainly Ash, the flora is rather poor, but bluebells are abundant.

== See also ==
- Marylands Nature Reserve
- Daws Heath
- Great wood
