= Church of St James the Less, Hadleigh =

Church in Essex, England

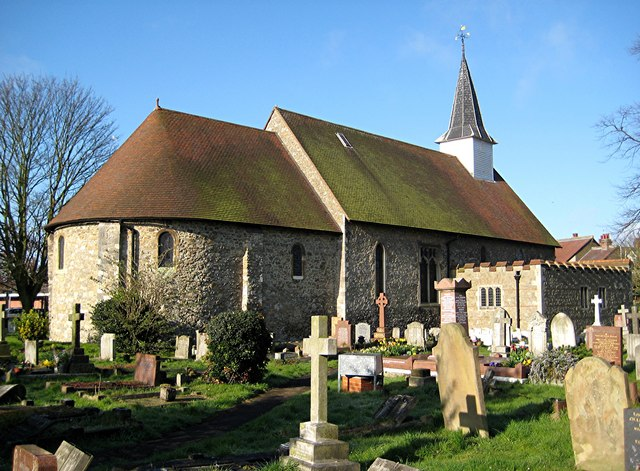
- Church of St James the Less, Hadleigh
- 51.553080°N 00.609574°E
- Denomination: Church of England
- Churchmanship: Contemporary worship
- Website: St James the Less

History
- Dedication: St James the Less

Architecture
- Functional status: Parish church
- Heritage designation: Grade I
- Designated: 7 August 1952
- Architectural type: Church

Administration
- Diocese: Chelmsford
- Parish: Hadleigh

The Church of St James the Less, is a grade I listed church in Hadleigh, Essex.

The church is of predominantly Norman construction with the chancel and nave dating to the 12th century.
