= Marylands Nature Reserve =

Nature reserve in Hockley, Essex, England

Coordinates: 51.6085°N 0.65442°E

Marylands
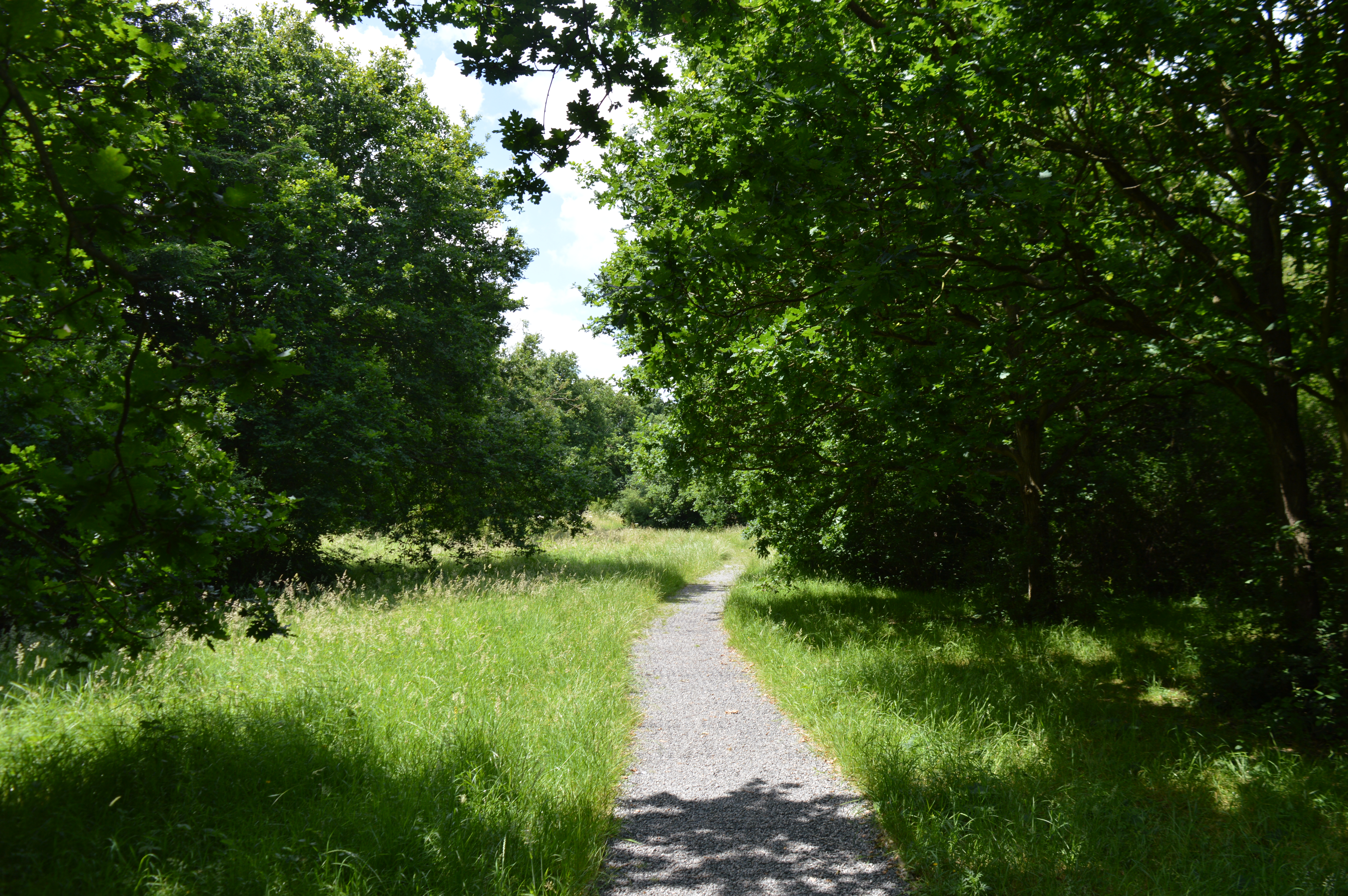
- Interactive map of Marylands
- Type: Local Nature Reserve
- Location: Hockley, Essex
- OS grid: TQ839933
- Area: 3.7 hectares (9.1 acres)
- Manager: Hockley Parish Council

Marylands is a 3.7 hectare Local Nature Reserve in Hockley in Essex. It is owned by Rochford District Council and managed by Hockley Parish Council.

The site has a varied fauna and flora, with 96 species of trees, shrubs, grasses and herbs, and 13 of butterflies. Nine of the tree species are associated with ancient woodland. There are woodland and farmland birds, and a stream with sticklebacks.

The site is near Plumberow Road and there is full public access.

== See also ==
Hockley Woods
