= Thundersley Great Common =

Protected area in Essex, England

Coordinates: 51.575°N 0.592°E

- Site of Special Scientific Interest
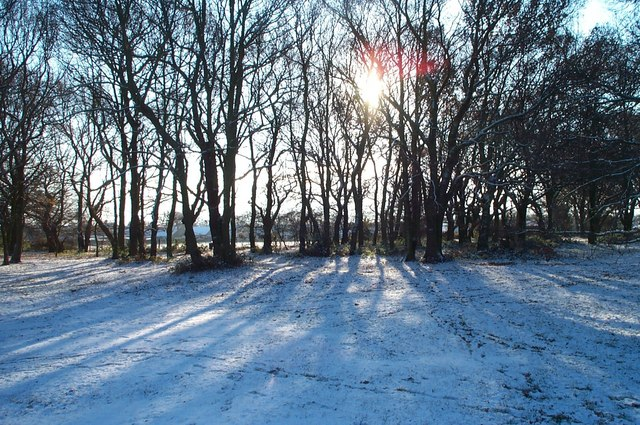
- Location of Thundersley Great Common.
- Area of search: Essex
- Grid reference: TQ 793891; TQ 797894
- Interest: Biological
- Area: 8.9 ha (22 acres)
- Notification date: 1987
- Location map: Magic Map

Thundersley Great Common or Thundersley Common is an 8.9-hectare (22-acre) biological Site of Special Scientific Interest in Thundersley in Essex. It is managed as public open space by Castle Point Borough Council.

The site is in two separate areas, and has a variety of grass and heath habitats. There wet and dry heathland, both unusual in Essex, and have locally uncommon plants. Heather and gorse are dominant in areas which are not mown, and ponds which dry up in the summer provide an additional habitat.

There is access from Common Approach and Kingsley Lane.

== Land ownership ==
All land within Thundersley Great Common SSSI is owned by the local authority.
