= Hadleigh Country Park =

Country park in Essex, England

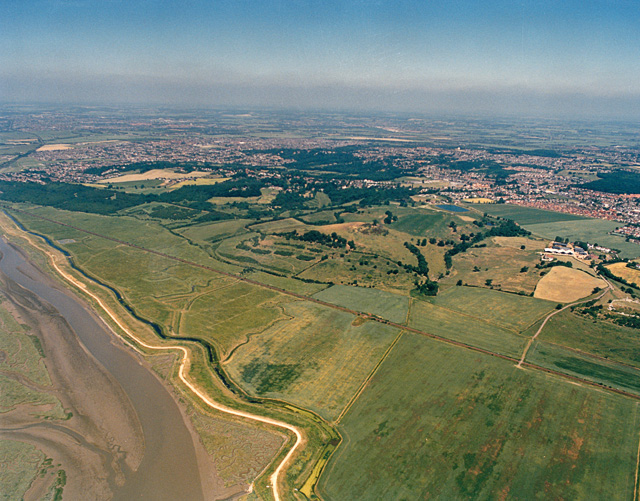
- Aerial view of the park
- Interactive map of Hadleigh Country Park
- Type: Country Park
- Location: Hadleigh, Essex, England
- Area: 152 hectares (380 acres)
- Operator: Essex County Council
- Open: All year

Hadleigh Country Park is a country park in Hadleigh, Essex, England.

== History ==
The park was formerly called Hadleigh Castle Country Park. The park was conceived in the 1930s but not created until the 1970s. Hadleigh Castle is adjacent but separate and managed by English Heritage.

== Facilities ==
The park is home to an Iron Age roundhouse, mountain biking trails, horse riding, a reservoir, conservation area, walking routes, a visitor centre and natural habitats.

== Conservation area ==
The park incorporates a wetland conservation area and salt marsh that is home to dragonflies.

== Events ==
The park was the venue for mountain biking in the 2012 Summer Olympics. There is also stargazing.
