= Hadleigh Castle =

Grade I listed castle in the United Kingdom

- Essex, England
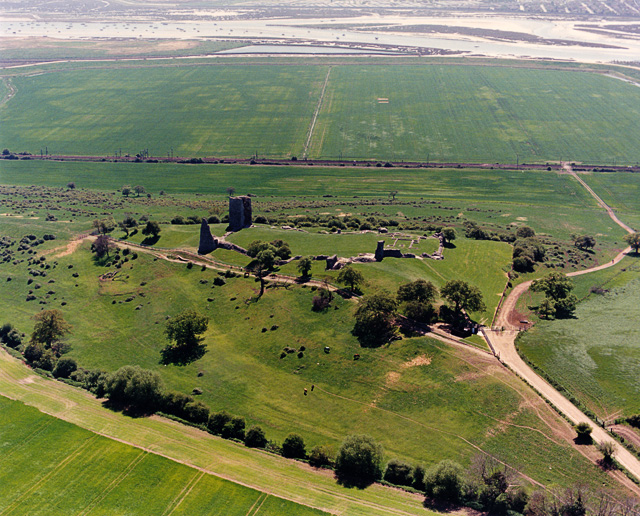
- Aerial view of Hadleigh Castle from the north, with the Thames Estuary in the background

Site information
- Owner: English Heritage
- Open to the public: Yes
- Condition: Ruined

Location
- Shown within Essex
- Location within Essex
- Coordinates: 51.5444°N 0.6090°E
- Grid reference: grid reference TQ810860

Site history
- Materials: Kentish ragstone

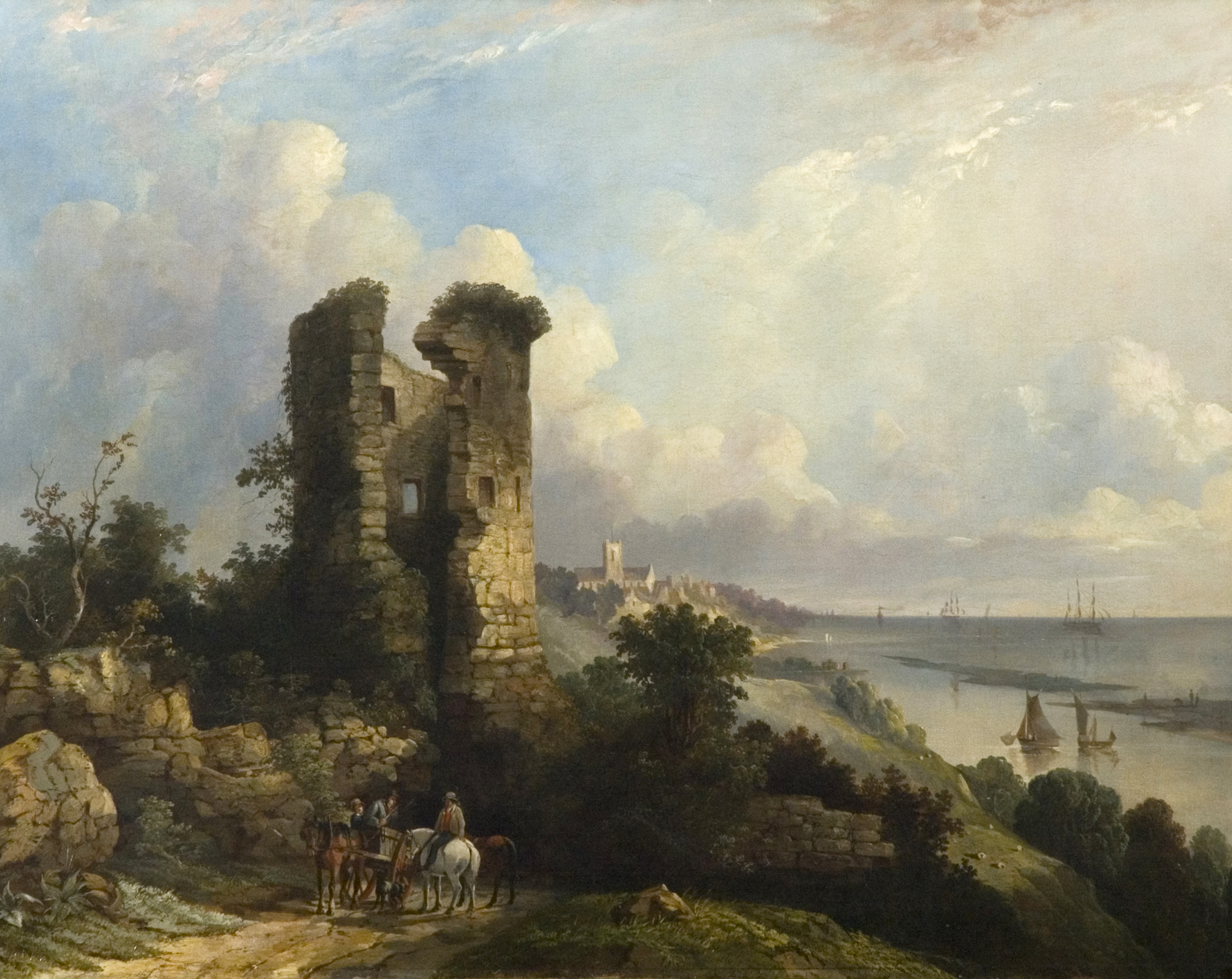
Hadleigh Castle by Henry Bright, Beecroft Art Gallery

Hadleigh Castle is a ruined fortification in the English county of Essex, overlooking the Thames Estuary from south of the town of Hadleigh. Built after 1215 during the reign of Henry III by Hubert de Burgh, the castle was surrounded by parkland and had an important economic and defensive role. The castle was significantly expanded and remodelled by Edward III, who turned it into a grander property, designed to defend against a potential French attack, as well as to provide the King with a convenient private residence close to London. Built on a soft hill of London clay, the castle has often been subject to subsidence; this, combined with the sale of its stonework in the 16th century, has led to it now being ruined. The remains are now preserved by English Heritage and protected under UK law as a Grade I listed building and scheduled monument.

== History ==
=== 13th century ===
Hadleigh Castle was first built by Hubert de Burgh, the 1st Earl of Kent, who was a key supporter of King John. De Burgh was given the honour of Rayleigh by John in 1215 as a reward for his services, but chose not to develop the existing caput of Rayleigh Castle, instead building a new fortification south of the town of Hadleigh. The exact date of construction is uncertain, but it is now believed the work was conducted early in de Burgh's tenure of the site, permission being retrospectively officially confirmed through a licence to crenellate in 1230 under Henry III.

The site was chosen on top of the South Essex south ridge, overlooking the Thames estuary, formed from generally soft deposits of London clay. In the 13th century, marshlands would have stretched away to the south of the castle, with the tide occasionally reaching up as far as the base of the hill itself, and the area would have been more wooded than today. By 1235 the park of Hadleigh had been formed around the castle, including woodland, a fishpond, stables and a park lodge, but the castle was also associated with a wider estate including Rayleigh, Thundersley and Eastwood Parks.

The first castle built on the site was probably of an octagonal design, running along the top of the ridge, protected by square and semi-circular mural towers, with a barbican guarding the eastern entrance. It probably resembled White Castle in Monmouthshire, remodelled by de Burgh in the same period, or Bolingbroke Castle in Lincolnshire and Beeston Castle in Cheshire, both built in the 1220s. The castle was built of Kentish ragstone and cemented by a mortar containing a large proportion of seashells, particularly cockleshells from the cockle beds of neighbouring Canvey Island. A valuable tidal watermill had been built by 1249, essential for making bread for the castle; recent archaeological work suggests that it was positioned on a wharf reaching out into the estuary just to the south-east of the castle. Terraced gardens were built along the south side of the castle overlooking the estuary, probably including vineyards.

De Burgh finally fell out of favour with Henry III; he was imprisoned and then finally stripped of Hadleigh Castle in 1239. For the rest of the century, Hadleigh was retained as a royal castle, as part of an estate containing 142 acres (57 ha) of agricultural land, the park and the castle mill. By the 1250s, the castle had fallen into neglect and, despite some investment after it was given to Queen Eleanor in 1273, it remained in relatively poor condition. Only the mill, vital for the operation of the wider estate, appears to have been well-maintained. A new 17-metre-wide by 9-metre-long (56 foot by 30 foot) hall and an adjacent solar complex were built at the castle around 1290, but collapsed due to subsidence shortly afterwards. In 1299 the castle was given to Queen Margaret, who complained about the quality of the building and insisted that repairs were carried out. Her husband, Edward I, visited the castle twice, using it as a base for hunting in the area.

=== 14th century ===
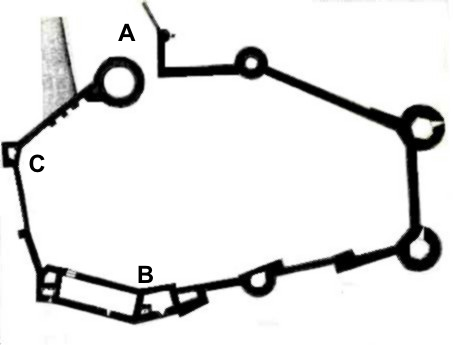
Plan of Hadleigh Castle in the late 14th century, based on the 1862 excavations: A – barbican entrance; B – royal apartments; C – postern gate

Edward II took a much closer interest in Hadleigh, leading to a period of renewal and rebuilding during his reign and that of his son, Edward III. Edward II first stayed there in 1311, and work was done to renovate the castle before he arrived, including building new royal quarters and repairing some of the castle walls that had succumbed to subsidence. Amongst the buildings known to be in the castle during the period were the castle hall, larder, kitchen, cellar, a long house, prison, an "old chamber" and armoury; they were guarded by a garrison of 24 soldiers during crises. Edward stayed there frequently during his reign up until 1324, on occasion travelling to Hadleigh Castle from London on his royal barge, which docked at a wharf to the south of the castle.

Edward III acquired Hadleigh Castle in 1330, when he recovered it from his mother, Isabella of France, who had taken it from Edward when she deposed him in 1326. Edward paid little initial interest to the castle, but in the 1360s decided to make much greater use of the property, ordering large parts of it to be rebuilt at a cost of more than £2200. (Note: Comparison of medieval financial figures with modern equivalents is notoriously challenging. For comparison, this sum corresponds to around eleven times the £200 a year average income of a baron during this period.) Between 1361 and 1363 the internal buildings were renovated and new royal lodgings built along the south walls, after which the east side of the castle was rebuilt entirely, with two large circular towers installed in a new stretch of curtain wall, completed by 1365. The north side of the castle was rebuilt to include a main entrance with a portcullis and a drawbridge, protected by a barbican and a large circular tower called the "High Tower", which was complete by 1370. The work was probably overseen by William of Wykeham.

Originally, historians believed that Edward's decision to rebuild much of the castle was in response to the growing tensions with France; in this version of events, Hadleigh would have formed an important coastal fortification along the Thames estuary, protecting it from French raids. Current historical opinion plays down this motivation, noting that at the time of the work on Hadleigh relations with France were unusually good. Instead, it is suspected that the increasing elderly Edward intended Hadleigh more as a personal retreat close to London, where he could stay in privacy and considerable comfort. Whilst the entrance on the inland side remained relatively basic, the building work created a grander impression from the estuary – any visitors to London, English or French, would have passed by Queenborough Castle on the south bank and Hadleigh on the north, the combination communicating a strong sense of royal power.

=== 15th–19th centuries ===
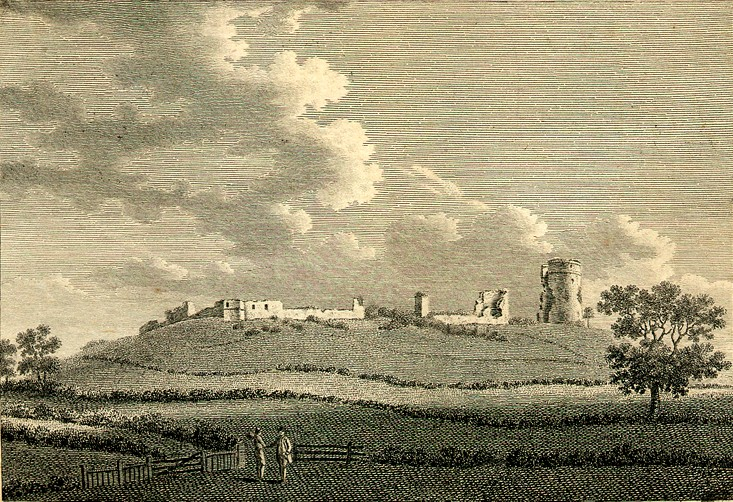
The towers, royal lodgings and remaining walls as seen from the south in an engraving of 1783, after Francis Grose

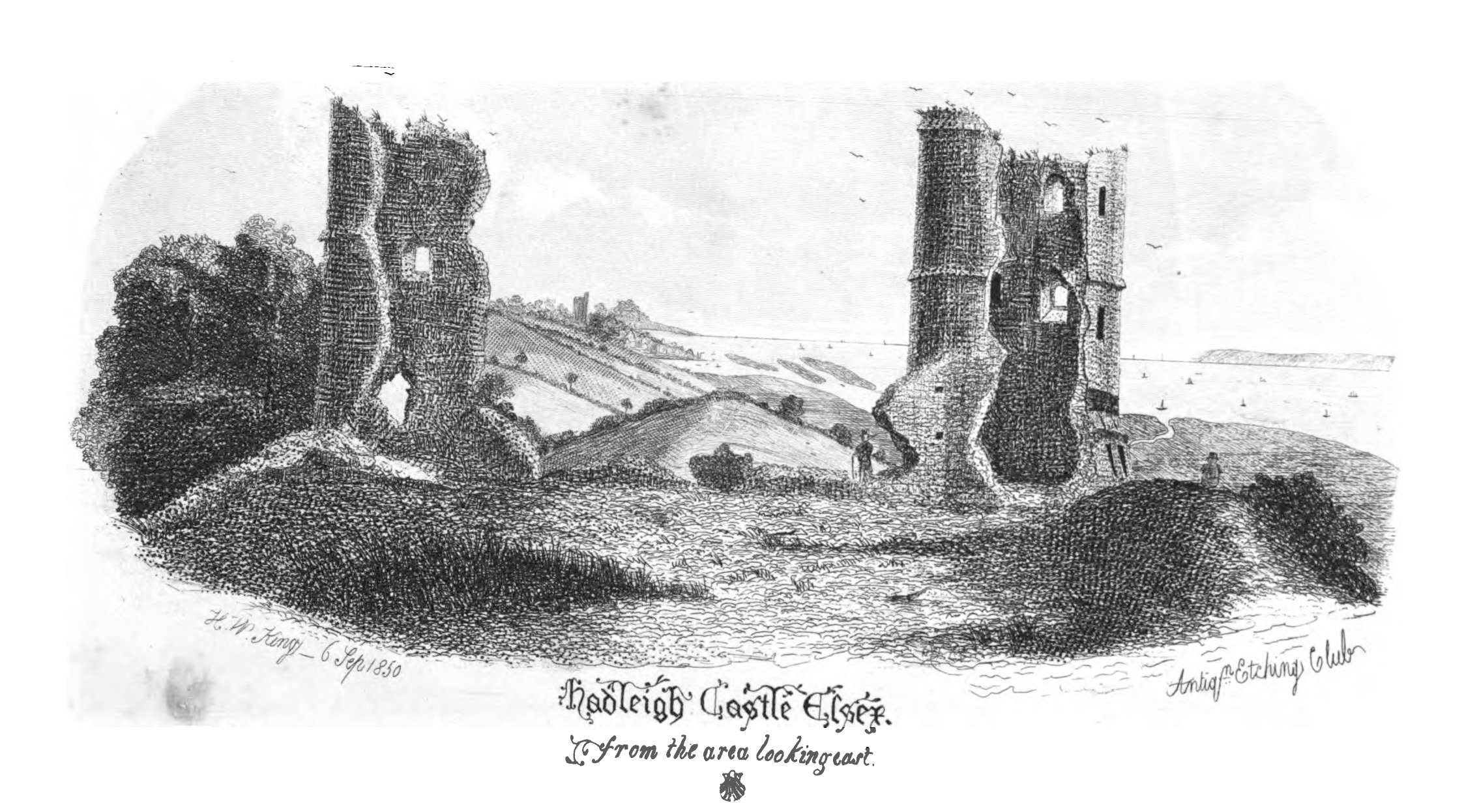
Etching by H.W. King, 1850.

Edward III's grandson, Richard II, made little use of Hadleigh, and the use of the castle was granted to Aubrey de Vere until his death in 1400. The castle was passed amongst a number of high-status owners during the 15th century, but saw little use by the crown. Edmund of Langley and his son Edward of Norwich, the Dukes of York, used the castle in the early years, before passing it on to Humphrey of Lancaster, the Duke of Gloucester. Richard, Duke of York, used the castle next, before it passed to Edmund Tudor in the middle of the century. The tradition of the castle forming part of the queen's property was then reinstated and it was granted to Elizabeth Woodville, the wife of Edward IV. Henry VIII made no known use of the castle himself, but it formed part of the dower of three of his wives – Catherine of Aragon, Anne of Cleves, and Catherine Parr – and the castle's parks were used as sources of timbers for his navy.

After 1544 the estate began to be broken up; first the parks were sold and then the castle itself, bought by Lord Richard Rich from Edward VI for £700 in 1551. (Note: It is difficult to accurately compare 16th-century and modern prices or incomes. Depending on the measure used, £700 in 1563 could equate to either £150,000 (using the retail price index) or £2.67 million (using the average earnings index). A prosperous member of the gentry might expect an annual income of at least £500 during the period.) Rich dismantled the castle for the value of its stone, primarily between 1551 and 1575, and the castle, now thoroughly ruined, passed through Rich's descendants.

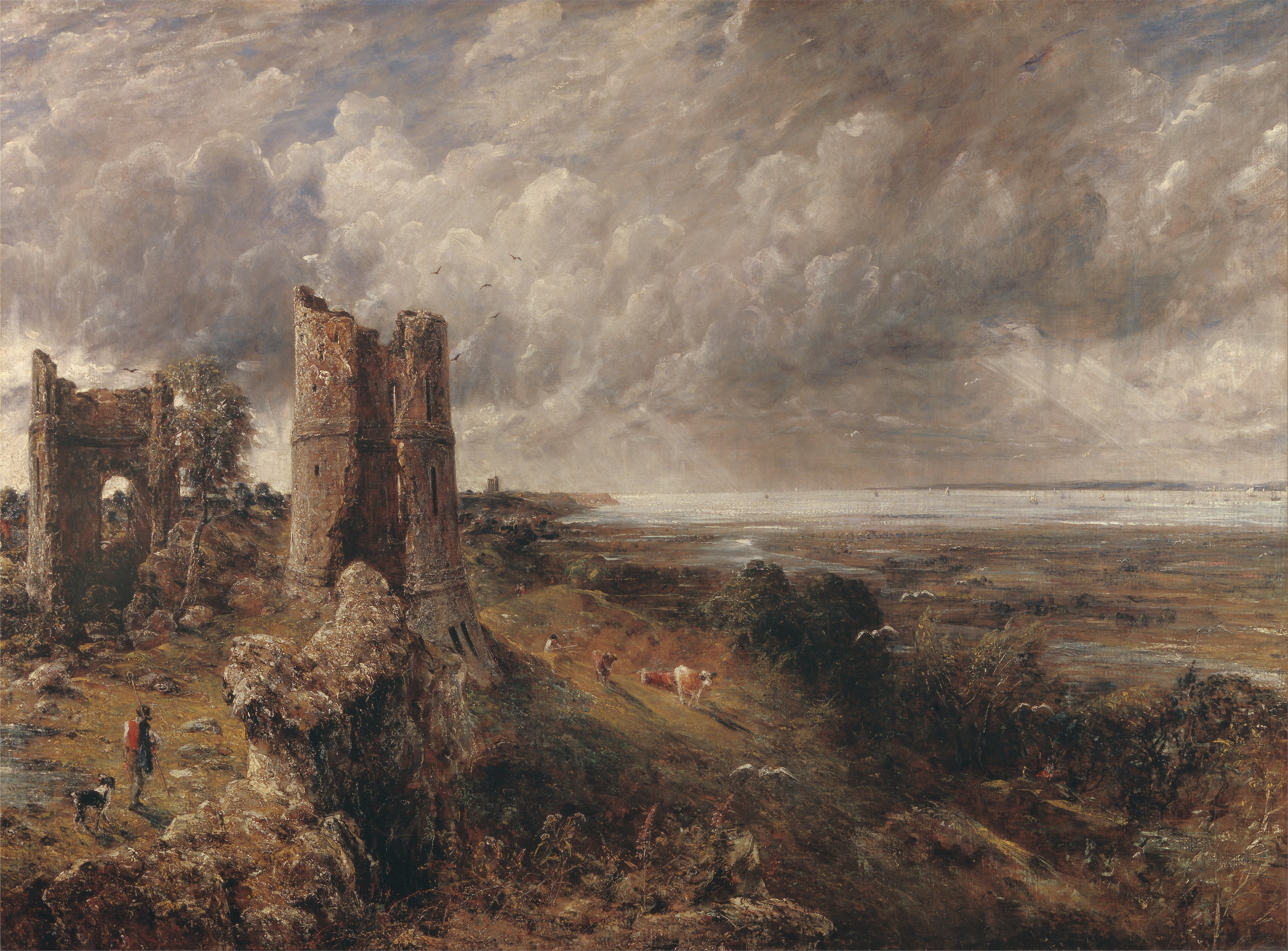
Hadleigh Castle, The Mouth of the Thames - Morning after a Stormy Night by John Constable, 1829

The English painter John Constable visited Hadleigh in 1814 and made a drawing of the castle as preparation for ten oil sketches and a single painting. The oil painting Hadleigh Castle was produced in 1829 and exhibited at the Royal Academy in the same year. One of the sketches is currently displayed at the Tate Gallery, London, while the painting now hangs in the Yale Center for British Art at New Haven, United States. Constable's painting, "one of his most monumental works" according to the art historians Tammis Groft and Mary Mackay, depicts the early 19th-century Hadleigh Castle as a decaying, man-made structure, succumbing to the elemental power of nature.

William Booth purchased Hadleigh Castle and its surrounding site in 1891 for the use of the Salvation Army, which established a farm to train the English poor prior to them being sent overseas to the British colonies. Considerable subsidence and slippage on the ridge occurred between 1898 and 1923, causing a collapse of the southern curtain wall.

=== Today ===
The Salvation Army gave the castle to the Ministry of Works in 1948, and it is now owned by English Heritage, classed as a scheduled monument and a Grade I listed building. Subsidence and landslips have continued; the north-east tower largely collapsed in the 1950s, and further major slippages occurred in 1969, 1970, and 2002. One of the three-storey towers at the eastern side stands to nearly full height with narrow rectangular windows in the upper levels. The second tower has only about one-third of its original form. Some sections of the curtain wall have survived, as well as the foundations of the great hall, solars, and the kitchen.

The castle is still surrounded by the 19th-century Salvation Army farm, and beyond that by Hadleigh Country Park, owned and managed by Essex County Council and a Site of Special Scientific Interest with special regard for invertebrates. In 2008, Hadleigh Farm, close to the castle, was announced as the venue for the mountain biking competition in the 2012 Summer Olympics.

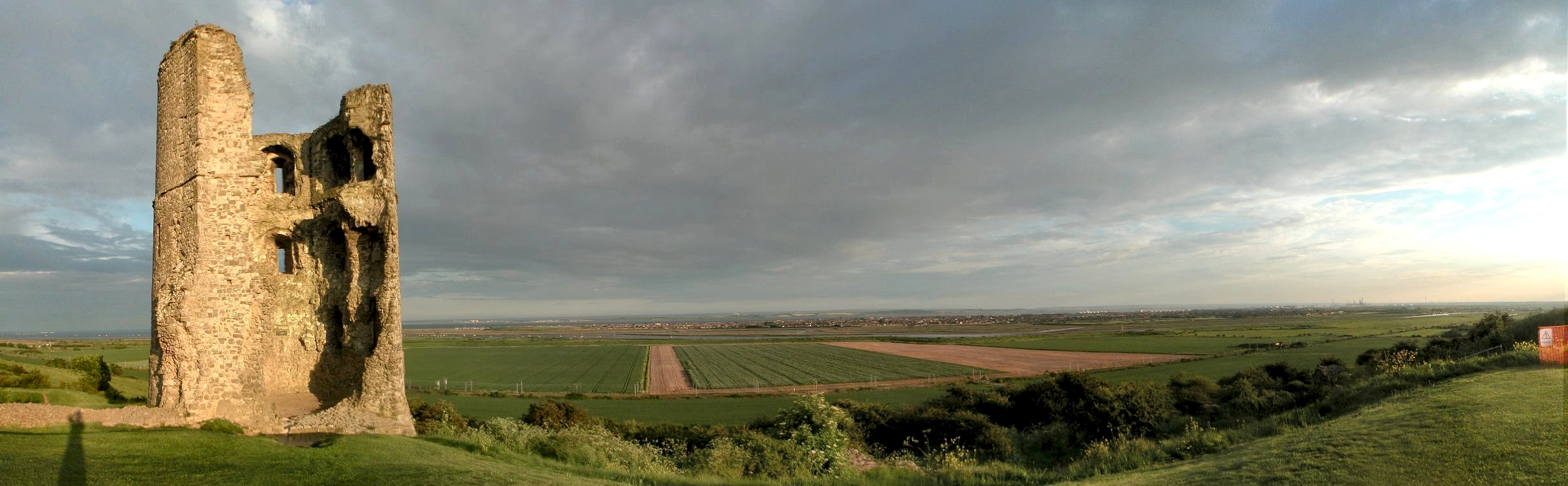
The view south from Hadleigh Castle, with the south-east tower on the left

== See also ==
- Castles in Great Britain and Ireland
- List of castles in England

== Bibliography ==
- Alexander, Magnus and Susan Westlake. (2009) Hadleigh Castle Essex, Earthwork Analysis: Survey Report. English Heritage Research Department Report 32/2009. ISSN 1749-8775.
- Bettley, James and Nikolaus Pevsner. (2007) Essex: the buildings of England. New Haven, US: Yale University Press. ISBN 978-0-300-11614-4.
- Creighton, Oliver Hamilton. (2005) Castles and Landscapes: Power, Community and Fortification in Medieval England. London: Equinox. ISBN 978-1-904768-67-8.
- Groft, Tammis Kane and Mary Alice Mackay. (1998) Albany Institute of History & Art: 200 years of collecting. New York: Hudsdon Hills Press. ISBN 978-1-55595-101-6.
- Hall, Hubert. (2003) Society in the Elizabethan Age. Whitefish, US: Kessinger Publishing. ISBN 978-0-7661-3974-9.
- Kenyon, John R. (2005). Medieval Fortifications. London: Continuum International Publishing Group. ISBN 0-8264-7886-7.
- King, H. W. (1863). "Hadleigh Castle," in Essex Archaeological Society Transactions, 2, pp. 82–92.
- Pounds, Norman John Greville. (1994) The Medieval Castle in England and Wales: a social and political history. Cambridge: Cambridge University Press. ISBN 978-0-521-45828-3.
- Singman, Jeffrey L. (1995) Daily life in Elizabethan England. Westport, US: Greenwood Press. ISBN 978-0-313-29335-1
