= Benfleet Urban District =

Former urban district in Essex, England

Coordinates: 51.55°N 0.59°E

Benfleet
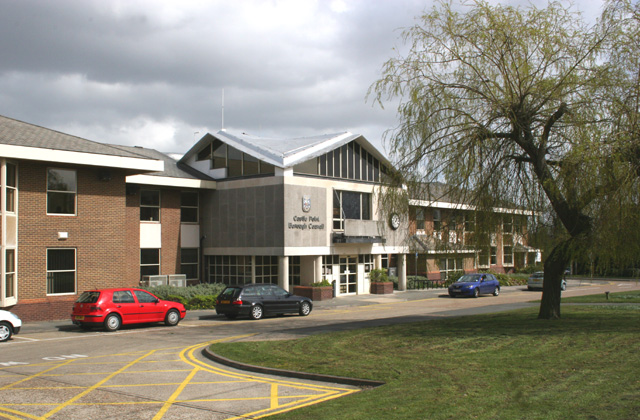
- Council's headquarters on Kiln Road, Thundersley
- Area
  - 1931: 6,356 acres (25.72 km^{2})
  - 1961: 6,372 acres (25.79 km^{2})
- Population
  - 1921: 6,136 (equivalent area)
  - 1971: 48,045
- History
  - Created: 1929
  - Abolished: 1974
  - Succeeded by: Castle Point
- Status: Urban district
  - HQ: Thundersley

Benfleet Urban District was an urban district in the county of Essex, England. It was created in 1929 and abolished in 1974.

The urban district was created on 1 October 1929 covering the three civil parishes of Hadleigh, South Benfleet and Thundersley, which had all previously formed part of the Rochford Rural District. Each parish had previously had a parish council, but on becoming part of the urban district they were reclassified as urban parishes and so became ineligible to have parish councils, with Benfleet Urban District Council being the lowest elected tier of local government.

The urban district council built itself a new headquarters on Kiln Road in Thundersley in 1962.

Benfleet Urban District was abolished in 1974 under the Local Government Act 1972, becoming part of the new district of Castle Point. The new council took over the old Benfleet Urban District Council's offices in Thundersley to serve as its headquarters. No successor parish was created for the former urban district and so it became unparished.
