= Prittle Brook =

Stream in south Essex, England

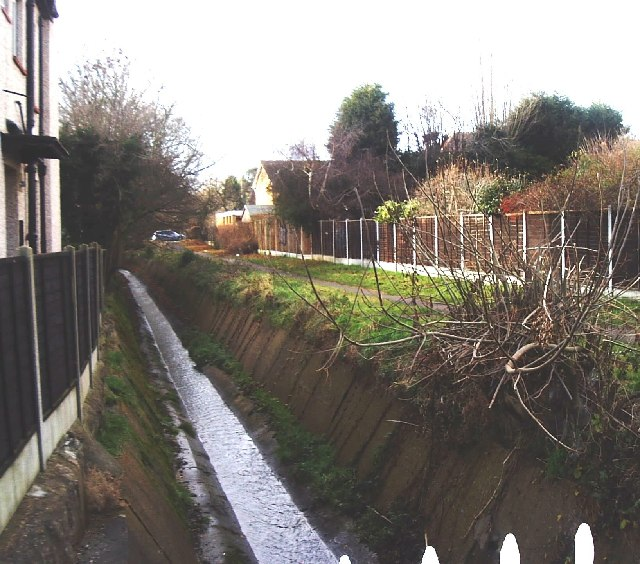
- Etymology: From the parish of Prittlewell

Location
- Country: England
- County: Essex
- District: Castle Point, Southend-on-Sea, Rochford

Physical characteristics
- Source
  - location: Thundersley Essex
  - coordinates: 51°33'38"N 0°35'40"E
- Mouth: River Roach, Rochford
  - coordinates: 51°34'27"N 0°42'59"E
- Length: 11.6 km (7.2 mi)

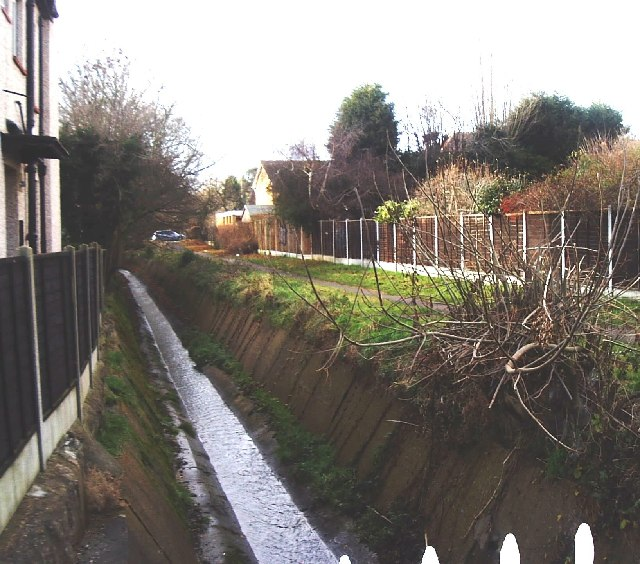
The Prittle Brook at Leigh on Sea showing the concrete walling

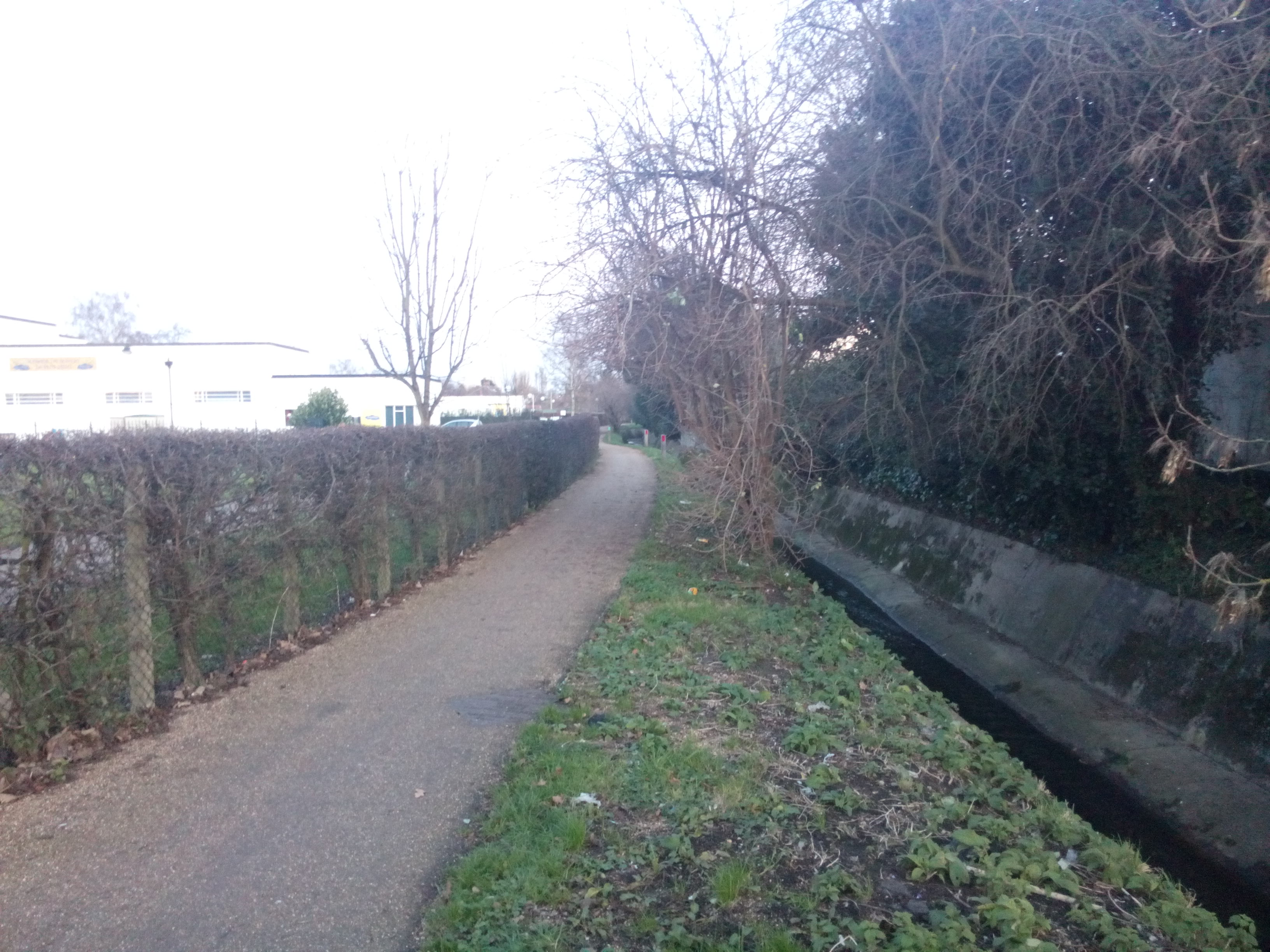
Prittle Brook has a footpath alongside for some of its length.

The Prittle Brook is a 7.2 mile (11.59 km) watercourse in south Essex, England. A tributary of the River Roach, the brook rises in Thundersley and passes through Hadleigh, Leigh-on-Sea, Westcliff, Prittlewell, Rochford and discharges into the Roach and then into the North Sea via the Roach and Crouch estuaries.

== Description ==
=== Course ===
Prittle Brook rises in Thundersley near Kiln Road opposite Shipwrights Drive (51°33'38"N 0°35'40"E) it flows (partly culverted) north then east and under Rayleigh Road (A129). It emerges from a culvert near Prittle Close, and combines with another stream flowing from the north. Flowing eastwards, its course is through West Wood, then under private properties before crossing under Daws Heath Road. It then flows through private property again before reaching Dodds Grove Nature Reserve and then into Hadleigh Great Wood and Belfairs Wood. The brook formed a series of meanders to the north of Hadleigh Great Wood. These were 'tampered with after 1920 and most of the meanders cut off'.

A small tributary arises near The Crescent, Hadleigh and flows east under Woodfield Road, to the north of St. David’s Drive, then under Highlands Boulevard and joins Prittle Brook to the rear of houses in Vardon Drive, Leigh-on-Sea (51°34'27"N 0°42'59"E). Another tributary arises in Hadleigh Great Wood and flows north east to join Prittle Brook at the boundary of the wood.

From Belfairs the brook flows east under Eastwood Road and broadly follows the alignment of Manchester Drive and Fairfax Drive – known as the Prittle Brook Greenway – to Prittlewell Chase Southend. From the eastern end of the Greenway the Prittle Brook flows under Victoria Avenue (A127), through Priory Park and north, past London Southend Airport to Rochford and eventually joins with an arm of the River Roach (Fleethall Creek) at Sutton Bridge (51°34'27"N 0°42'59"E). The normal tidal limit of the Roach is about 150 metres south of Sutton Bridge.

The Prittle Brook has a catchment area of 20.18 km^{2} (4,987 acres).

=== Prittle Brook Greenway ===
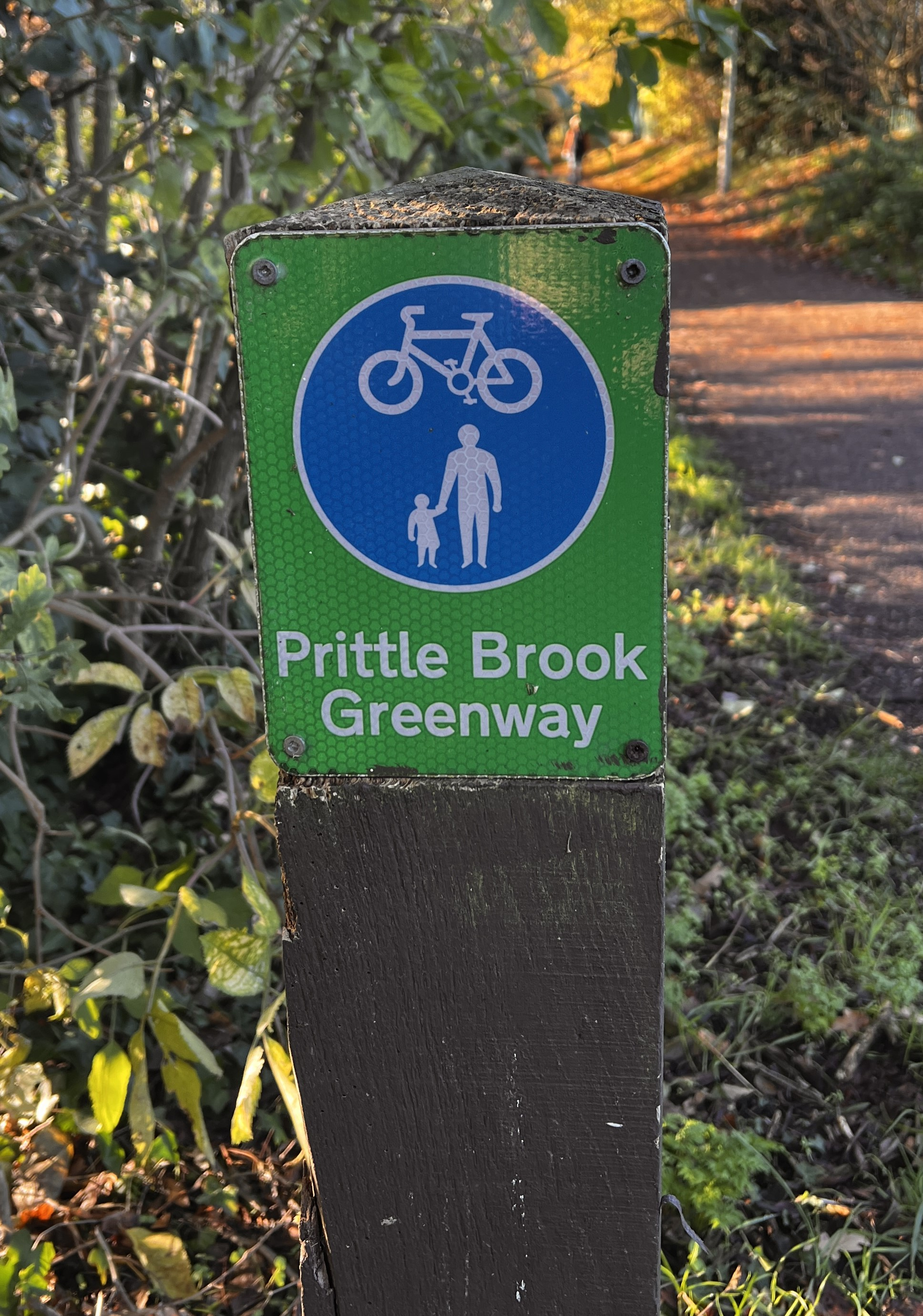
Prittle Brook Greenway marker post

A 5.7 km pathway (officially designated the "Prittle Brook Greenway" in 2010) enables walkers and cyclists to follow the section of the Brook from Belfairs, past Southend University Hospital to Roots Hall, effectively providing a route from Leigh into Southend which avoids the main roads. This pathway, built in the 1940s, follows the Prittle Brook as it passes under several roads; the bridge which leads to Our Lady of Lourdes School in Manchester Drive runs directly over the Brook. This part of the Brook's route has been urbanised since the 1930s, and the banks have been concreted east of the Belfairs Wood area. As a consequence, the velocity of the brook has greatly increased, a phenomenon particularly noticeable during and after heavy rain (see below).

The Prittle Brook Greenway was the subject of major improvement work between 2009 and 2012, during which the sections running parallel with Blenheim Chase and Prittlewell Chase were widened and signposted.

=== Flood defences ===
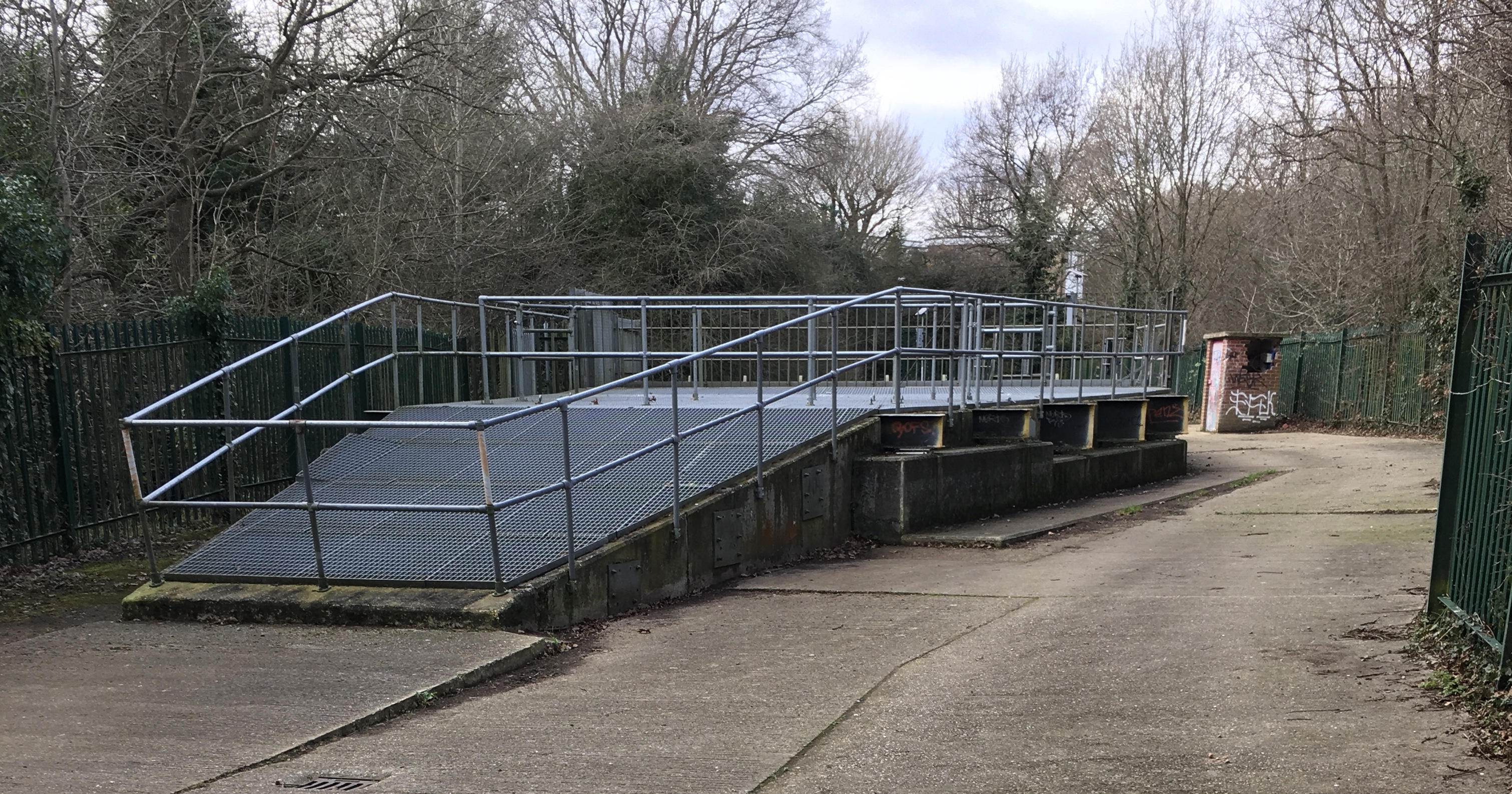
Prittle Brook relief tunnel inlet

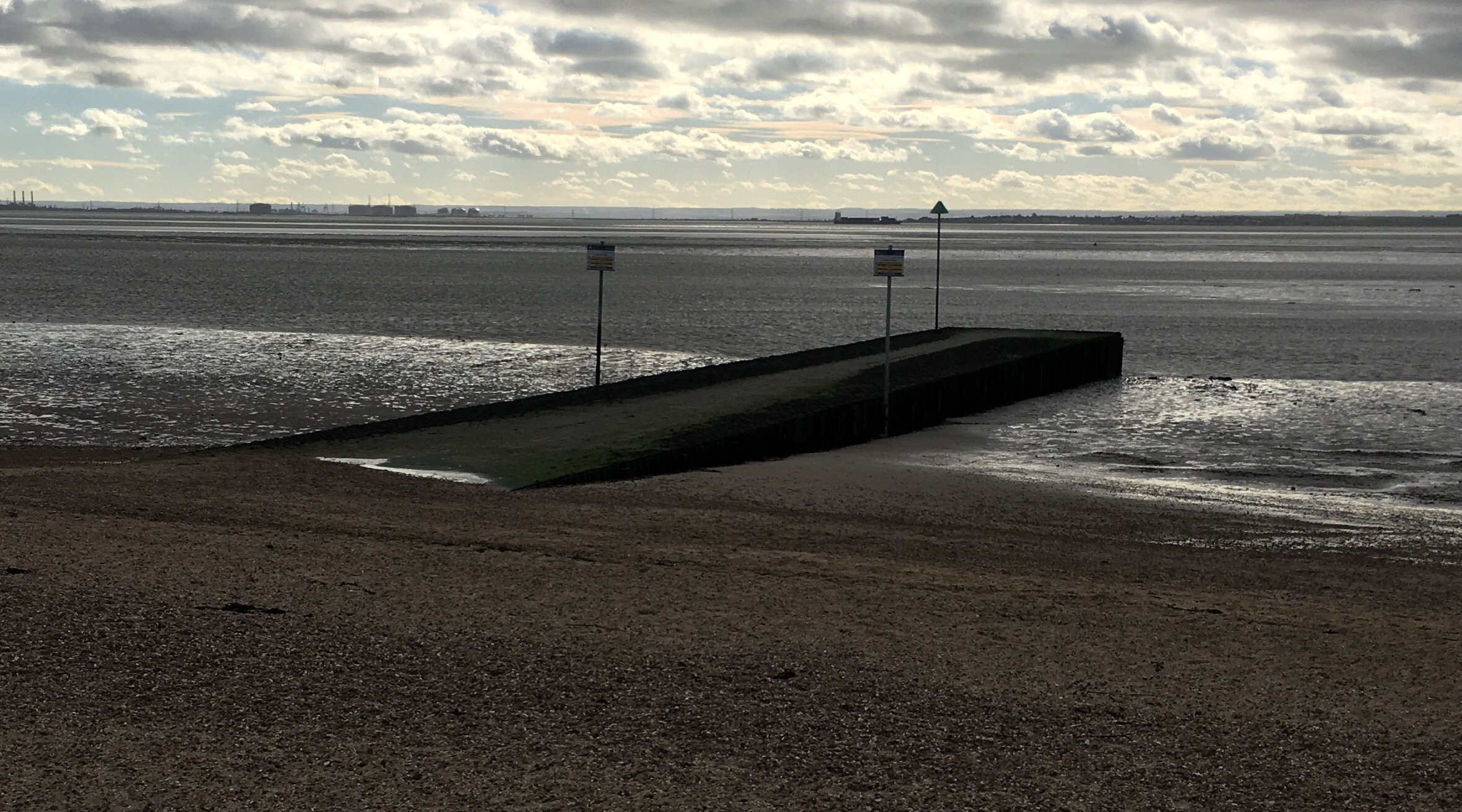
Prittle Brook relief tunnel outfall

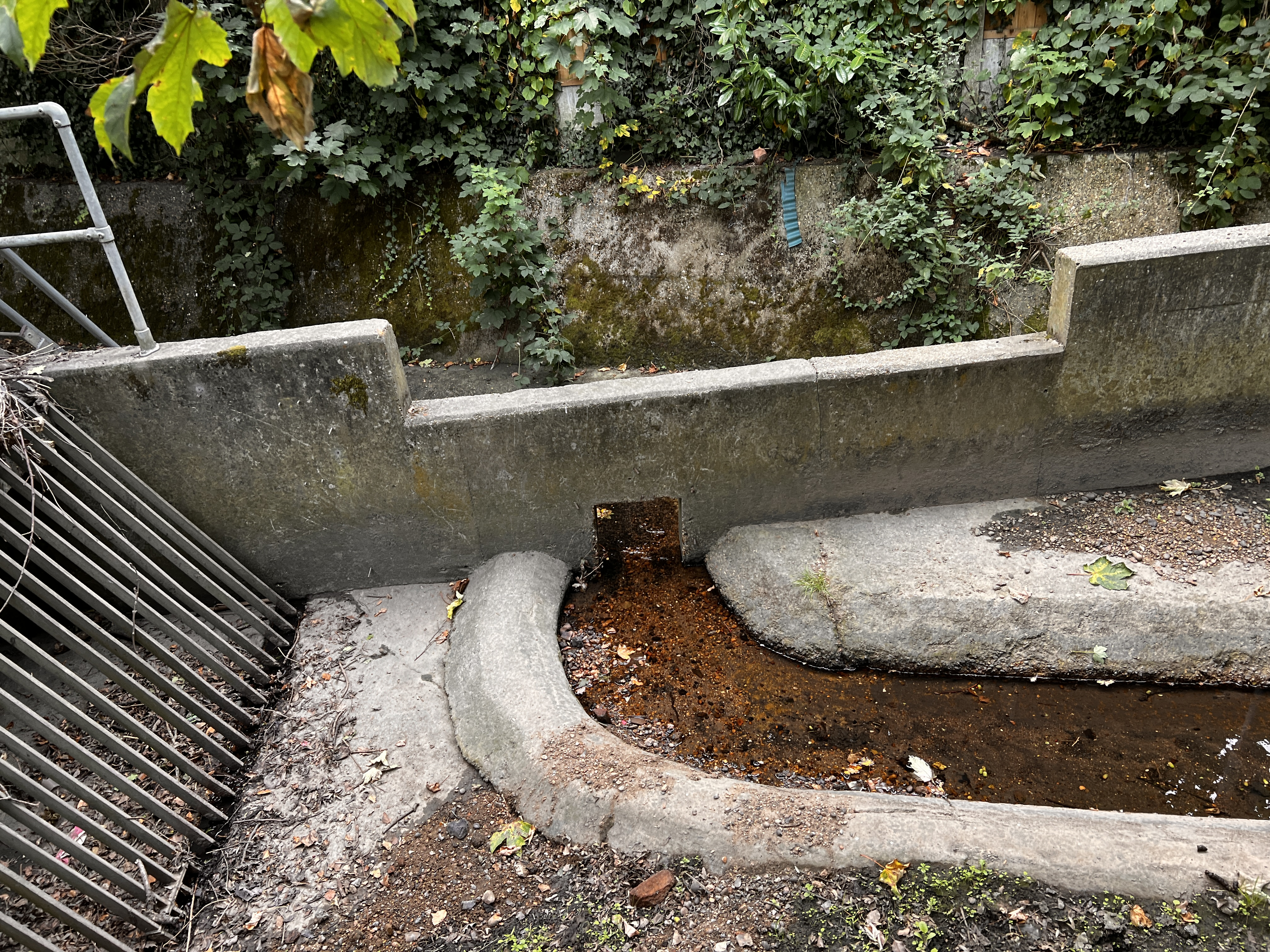
Prittle Brook overflow weir, Manchester Drive, Leigh

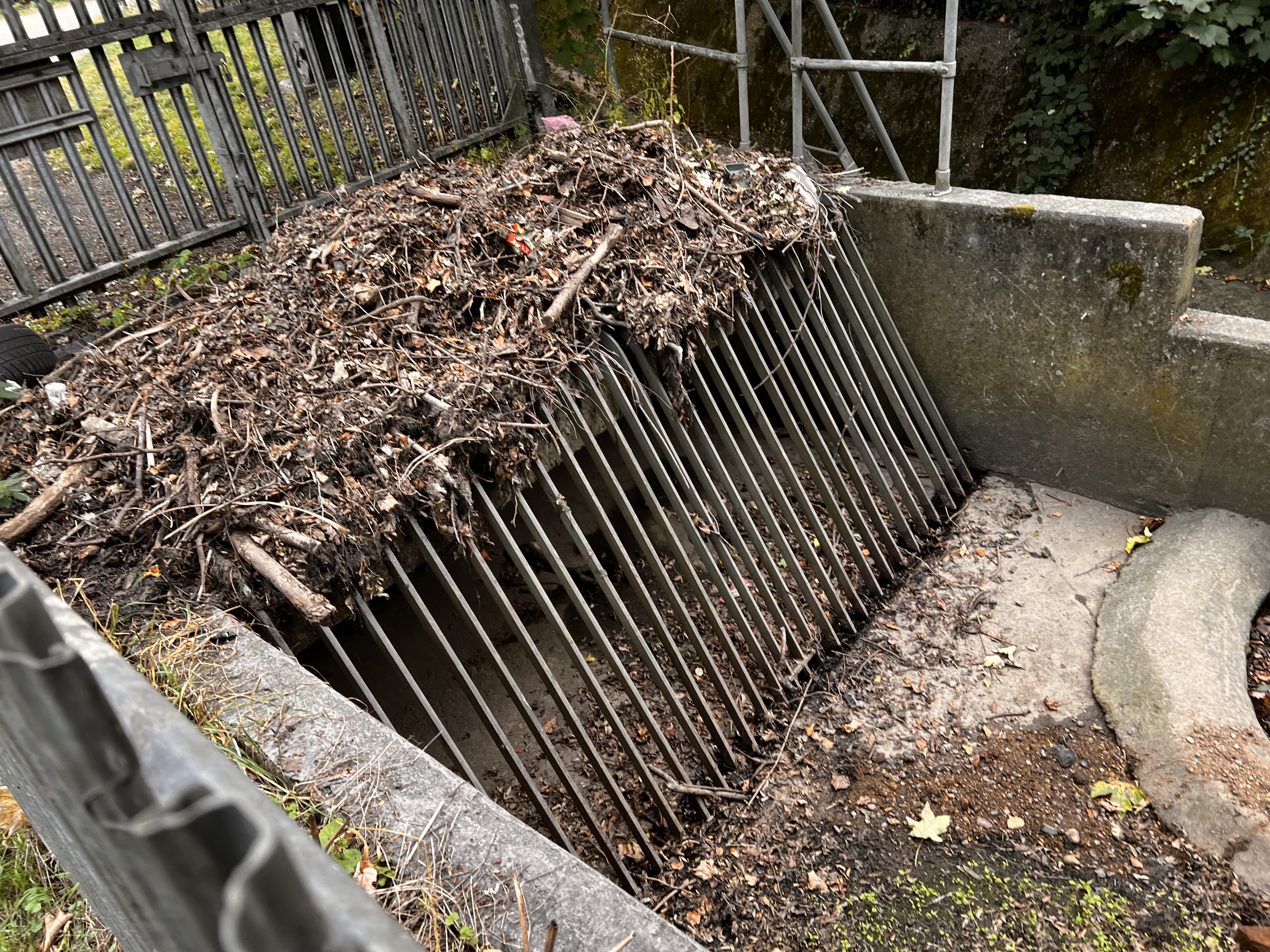
Prittle Brook overflow inlet, Manchester Drive, Leigh

In September 1968, during the Great flood of 1968, the Prittle Brook overflowed and flooded houses in Daws Heath Road, Hadleigh and around Manchester Drive, Leigh-on-Sea. The brook was subsequently culverted and provided with concrete embankments west of Daws Heath Road. In 1972–3 the Prittle Brook Flood Relief scheme was constructed. This takes excess water from the brook at times of flood from an inlet structure west of Eastwood Road (51°33'04"N 0°38'45"E. Elevation 33.5 metres AOD), Leigh-on-Sea and transfers water through an underground tunnel. Another intake to the tunnel is adjacent to Manchester Drive (51°33’03.5”N 0°39’41.6”E).The tunnel is 2.5 metres in diameter and is formed from segmented concrete blocks, it was constructed by Murphy using a rotary drum excavator. The tunnel discharges water into the River Thames at an outfall on the foreshore at Chalkwell beach.

The water level in the Prittle Brook is continuously monitored. The Prittlewell Brook [sic] Monitoring Station is located in Belfairs Park (51°33'10.9"N 0°38'28.0"E); it comprises a concrete flume and equipment cabinet. The current water level is accessible online.

Note: Coordinate 51.55109°N 0.70207°E is at Priory Park, Southend on Sea
