= Hadleigh, Essex =

Town in Essex, England

Coordinates: 51.5535°N 0.6095°E

Hadleigh
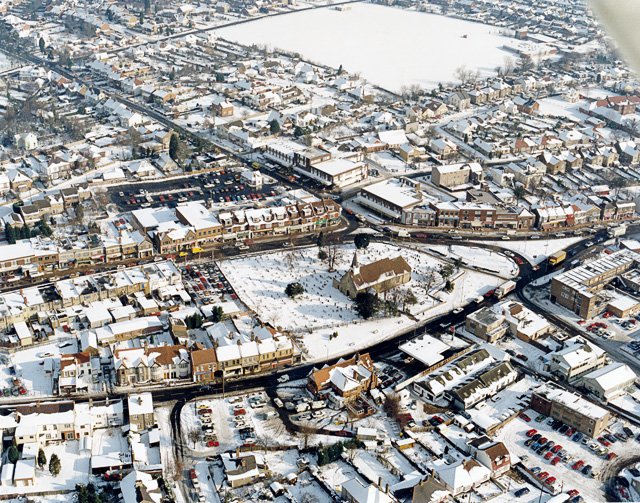
- Aerial view of Hadleigh town centre in snow, February 1991

- Location within Essex
- OS grid reference: TQ810870
- District: Castle Point
- Shire county: Essex
- Region: East
- Country: England
- Sovereign state: United Kingdom
- Post town: BENFLEET
- Postcode district: SS7
- Dialling code: 01702
- Police: Essex
- Fire: Essex
- Ambulance: East of England
- UK Parliament: Castle Point

Hadleigh is a town in the borough of Castle Point, in the south-east of Essex, England. It lies on the A13 road between Thundersley, Benfleet and Leigh-on-Sea. The A127 'Southend Arterial Road' bypasses the town to the north.

== History ==
Hadleigh is known for Hadleigh Castle, and the adjoining country park to the south of the town centre. The castle's name is referenced in the name of the local government district of Castle Point, along with Canvey Point. The castle has extensive views overlooking the Thames Estuary. Most of the facing stones were stripped from the castle in the 16th century – the only bits still visible today being high inside the surviving towers and a small section of the 'gate house' – so most of what remains today is the rubble infill that was packed between the outer facing stones. Despite this the skeletal remains are pleasing to the eye and have been considered a romantic ruin for a few hundred years. John Constable painted Hadleigh Castle in 1829. The painting now belongs to the Yale Center for British Art, and is on permanent display in its museum on the Yale campus.

Based on the previous census, writing in 1848, Samuel Lewis, summarised the facts of its history and economy as follows:

- It had 366 inhabitants.
- The Poor Law Union covering the area was Rochford
- In the reign of Henry II of England a castle was built here by Hubert de Burgh, Earl of Kent, the remains are situated on the brow of a steep hill, and consist chiefly of two circular towers.
- The living is a discharged rectory, valued in the king's books at £11. 14. 7.; net income, £450 [per year]; patrons, the Rector and Fellows of Lincoln College, Oxford. The church is an ancient structure, of which the eastern end is semicircular, and in the Norman style. A school is endowed with £781 three % consols.

In the 19th century, Hadleigh was the home of the cunning man James Murrell. He died in the town in December 1860.

Hadleigh was an ancient parish in the Rochford Hundred of Essex. When elected parish and district councils were established in 1894, Hadleigh was given a parish council and included in the Rochford Rural District. In 1929, Hadleigh and its neighbours South Benfleet and Thundersley were removed from the Rochford Rural District to form the new Benfleet Urban District. Hadleigh continued to exist as a civil parish after the 1929 reforms, but classed as an urban parish, making it ineligible to have a parish council; Benfleet Urban District Council was the lowest tier of local government. The civil parish and Benfleet Urban District were both abolished in 1974 when the new Castle Point district was created. At the 1951 census (one of the last before the abolition of the civil parish), Hadleigh had a population of 5,209.

The town has never had a railway station and almost all of its architecture is late 19th and 20th century – only three buildings are listed but one of these is the church, which is Grade I listed.

== Landmarks ==
The castle ruins are set at the top of a hill overlooking the Thames Estuary, and the Canary Wharf development nearly 30 miles to the west can be seen when visibility is adequate. Another building of note is the Church of St James the Less which was believed to be Norman but is now known to be Saxon because of its general dimensions, window alignments, Saxon Romanesque arches, pagan Saxon puddingstone inclusions and the pagan Saxon "fairy wheel" motif carved into the wall by the north door. The church remains picturesque and its neighbouring street layout resembles St Clement Danes in that it stands in the middle of a bustling high street. However, it has a considerably larger churchyard.

== Salvation Army Farm Colony ==
The colony was established in Hadleigh in 1891 by William Booth, a preacher who founded the Salvation Army Christian organisation. He believed every human being should have food and shelter and published a plan to rescue the destitute from the squalor of London. His vision was that the poor would be given board and lodgings in a City Colony in exchange for a day's work. They could then move to a Farm Colony where they would be trained to work the land and run their own smallholdings. Then finally they could progress to Overseas Colonies, running smallholdings abroad.

The trial City Colony was set up in Whitechapel in 1889 and two years later Booth put down a deposit on land in Hadleigh for his Farm Colony. Starting with 800 acres (3.2 km^{2}) of land, later expanding to 3,200 acres (13 km^{2}), the farm was home to 200 colonists by the end of its first year. Existing farm buildings were renovated and new dormitories, a bathhouse, laundry, reading room, hospital and religious meeting house were built. As well as farming and market gardening, colonists were taught brickmaking, pottery and construction skills. Today the colony operates an employment training centre for people who have special training needs, and accepts referrals from Social Services and the Employment Service. The aim is to create a realistic working environment, with the intention of helping clients gain the skills necessary for work elsewhere. Employment at the training centre – reminiscent of the colony's origins – includes horticulture, carpentry, catering, office skills and estate management.

== Governance ==
There are two tiers of local government covering South Benfleet, at district and non-metropolitan county level: Castle Point Borough Council and Essex County Council.

Hadleigh was an ancient parish in the Rochford Hundred of Essex. When elected parish and district councils were established in 1894, Hadleigh was given a parish council and included in the Rochford Rural District. In 1929 the parish and its neighbours South Benfleet and Thundersley were removed from the rural district and united to become Benfleet Urban District. The three parishes were thereafter classed as urban parishes and so were no longer eligible to have parish councils, with the lowest elected tier of local government being Benfleet Urban District Council.

Benfleet Urban District was abolished in 1974 under the Local Government Act 1972, becoming part of the new district of Castle Point. As part of the 1974 reforms the former urban district became unparished. Castle Point Borough Council is therefore the lowest elected tier of local government covering Hadleigh.

== Sport ==
Leigh Town Football Club in the Essex Olympian Football League play at John Burrows which also the site of Hadleigh and Thundersley Cricket Club.

It was announced in August 2008 that Hadleigh Farm (including the area around the castle) would host the London 2012 Olympic mountain biking events. The actual event took place on Saturday 11th and Sunday 12 August.

== Media ==
The area is served by BBC London and ITV London with television signals received from Crystal Palace TV transmitter, Local radio stations are BBC Essex on 95.3 FM, Heart East on 96.3 FM and Radio Essex on 105.1 FM. The local newspapers are The Evening Echo and The Canvey and Benfleet Times.

== Gallery ==
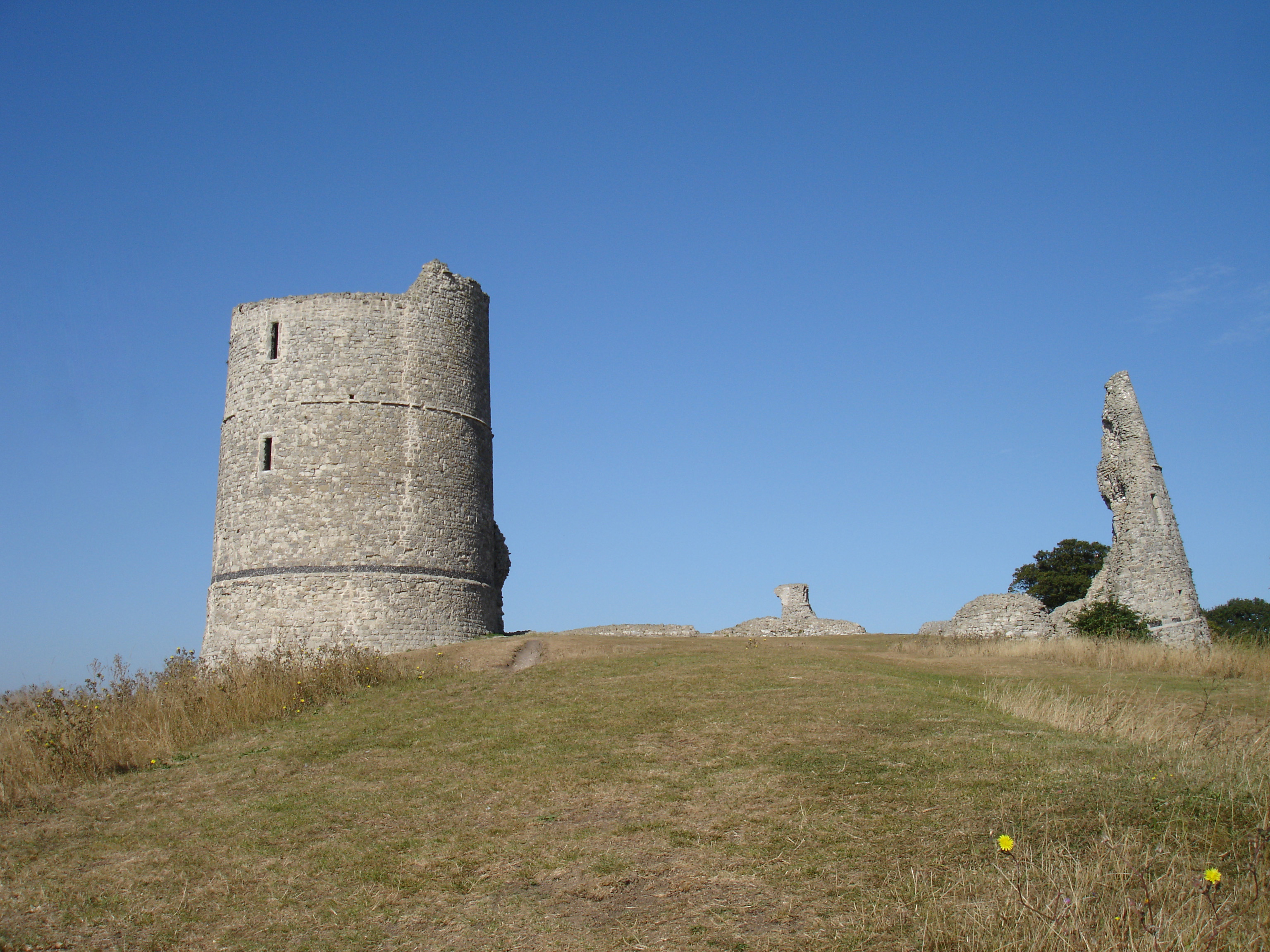
Hadleigh Castle

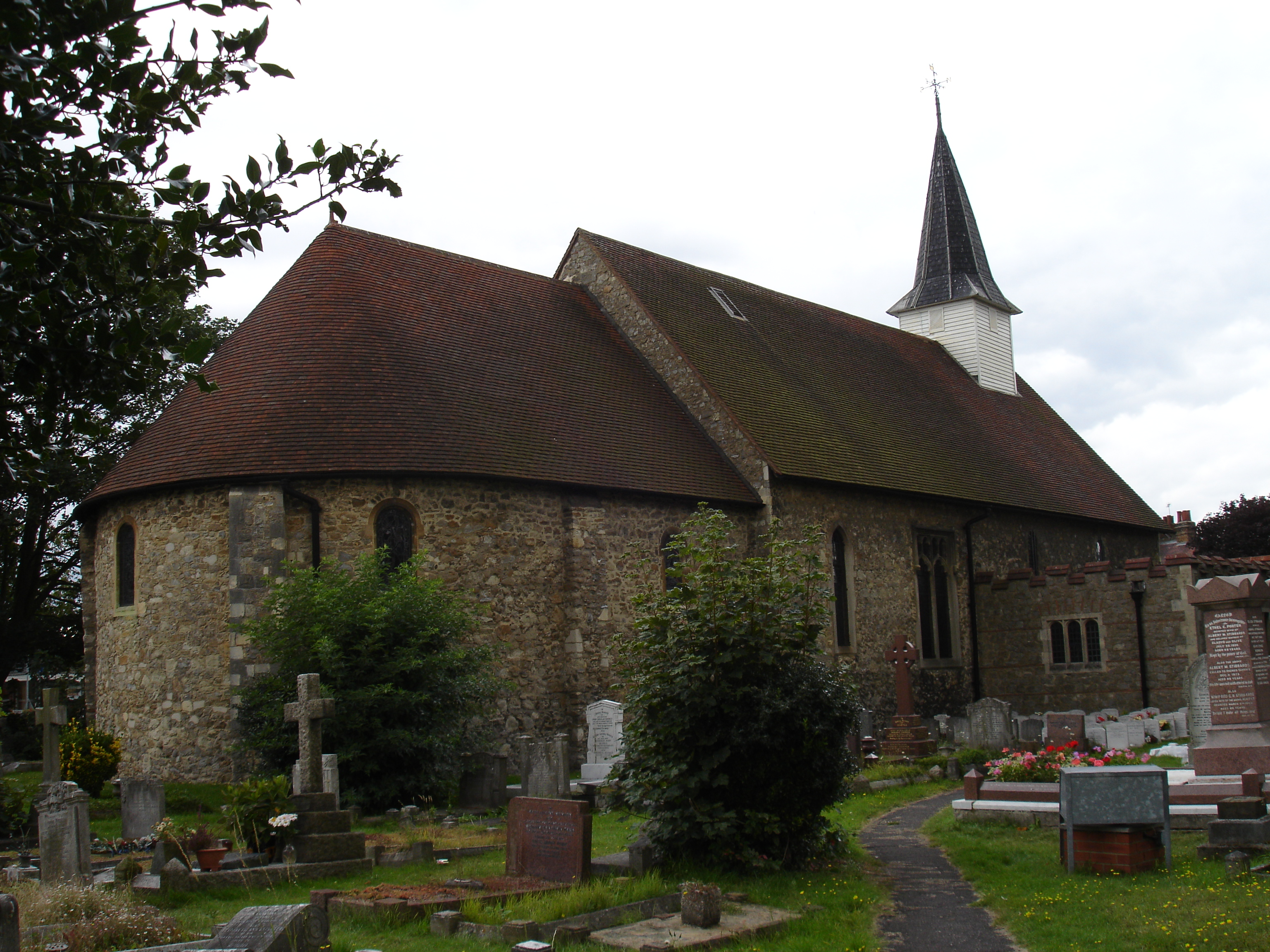
Church of St James the Less, Hadleigh, Essex

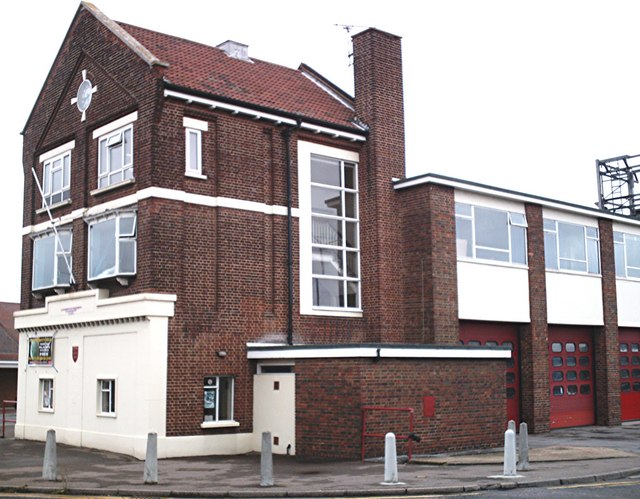
Fire Station

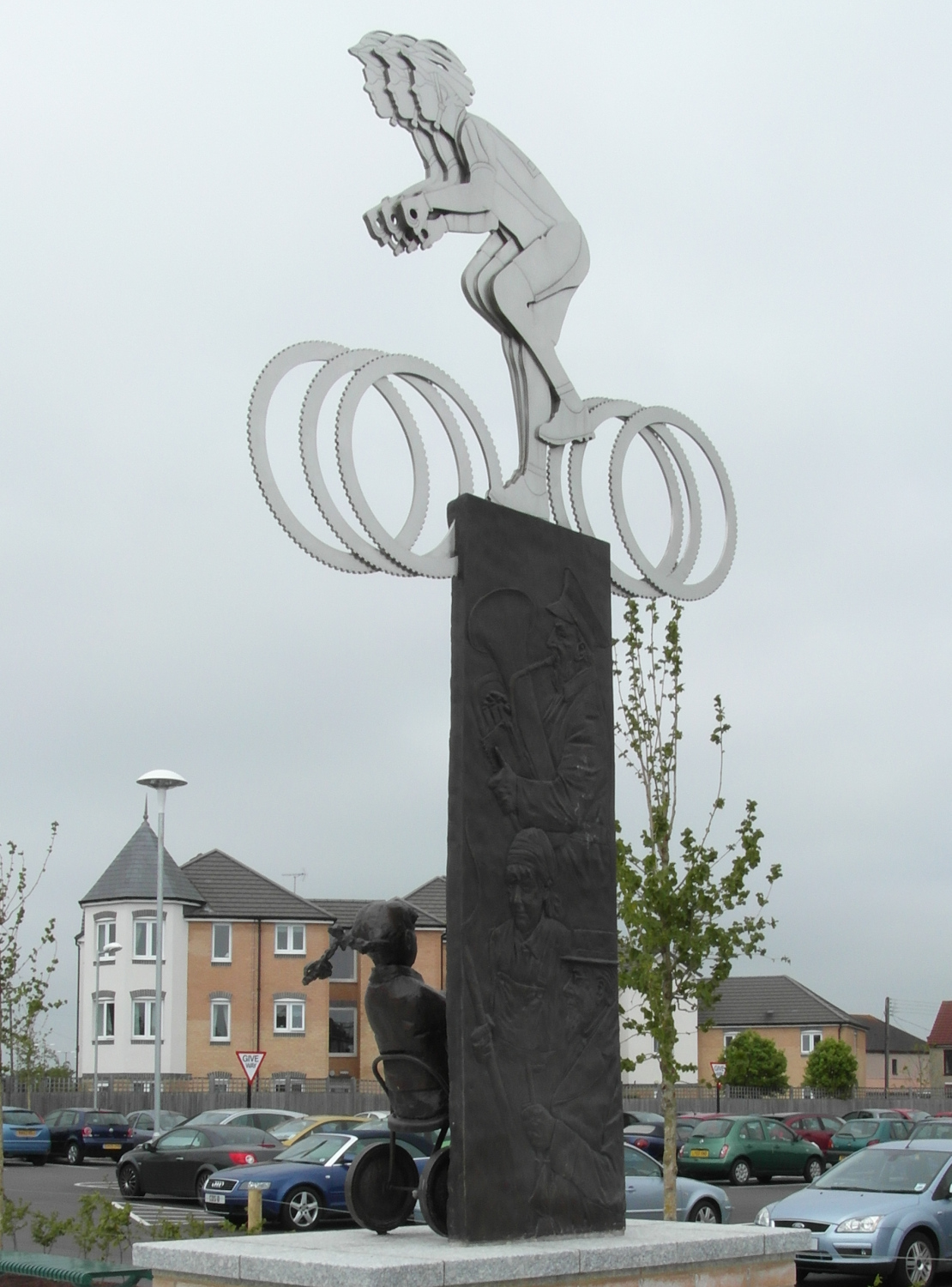
The Hadleigh Sculpture

== See also ==
- Hadleigh Bus Depot
