= Thundersley =

Village and former civil parish in Essex, England

Coordinates: 51.57°N 0.59°E

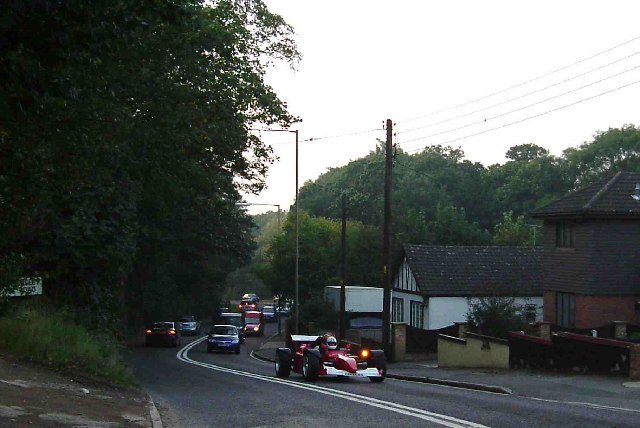
- Bread and Cheese Hill, part of the A13, is the name of one of the roads climbing the main slope up to Thundersley from South Benfleet.

- Location within Essex
- OS grid reference: TQ800887
- District: Castle Point
- Shire county: Essex
- Region: East
- Country: England
- Sovereign state: United Kingdom
- Post town: BENFLEET
- Postcode district: SS7
- Dialling code: 01268 & 01702
- Police: Essex
- Fire: Essex
- Ambulance: East of England
- UK Parliament: Castle Point

Thundersley is a village and former civil parish located within the Borough of Castle Point in southeast Essex, England. It is 31 miles (50 km) east of Charing Cross, London and 23 miles south of the county town of Chelmsford. Thundersley is in the ecclesiastical parish of Thundersley St Peter and St Michael's & All Angels, and includes the hamlet of Daws Heath.

Thundersley is designated under "Thundersley and South Benfleet" built up area by the Office for National Statistics. The area also includes Hadleigh, Daws Heath and South Benfleet and had a population of 49,885 at the 2021 census.

== Toponymy ==
Thundersley derives from the Old English Þunres lēah, meaning "grove or meadow [perhaps sacred] belonging to the god Thunor or Thor". It has also historically been known as Thunresleam. The place-name is first attested in the Domesday Book of 1086, where it appears as Thunreslea.

== Geography ==
The area is relatively hilly for Essex, with the land being on average 200 feet (60 m) above sea level, and sits on a crop of materials known as the Rayleigh Hills. The village is interdespersed with large and commons. These include Thundersley Common (a Site of Special Scientific Interest), Shipwrights Wood (12 hectares) and Thundersley Glen all owned and managed by the council; West Wood (22½ hectares acres) owned by the council and managed by Castle Point Wildlife Group; Coombe Wood is under mixed ownership and much of it has Village Green status.

== History ==
Thundersley is first recorded in the Doomsday book of 1086. The settlement was under the ownership of Swein of Essex, the son of Robert FitzWimarc, and consisted of 12 households, 2 lord's plough teams and 2 men's plough teams, pasture for 200 sheep and woodland for 50 pigs.

Samuel Lewis's major work, a Topographical Dictionary of England in 1848 gives this account:

THUNDERSLEY (St. Peter), a parish, in the union of Billericay [...] S.[outh] division of Essex, 2¼ miles (S. W. by W.) from Rayleigh; containing 596 inhabitants, of whom 120 are in the hamlet. This parish is about two miles in length [east-west], and a mile and a half in breadth, and comprises 2100 acres, of which 100 are common or waste; the village is on elevated ground, and the surrounding scenery is pleasingly diversified. The [parish priest] living...[was] valued in the king's books at £14. 13. 4., and in the gift [appointment of the Rev. G. Hemming: the tithes have been commuted [near-eliminated] for £570; there is a parsonage-house, and the glebe comprises 40 acres. The church is a venerable structure in the later Norman and early English styles, with a tower and spire.

Greeves motorcycles were produced in a purpose-built factory at Thundersley from 1953 to 1976. Initially the bikes were an offshoot of the Invacar company, which produced invalid cars and needed to diversify its products.

== Schools and colleges ==
There is one secondary school in Thundersley, The King John School and Sixth Form, with a further one, The Deanes located in St Michael's Ward which covers Daws Heath. There is also USP College (Seevic Campus) for further education, and Cedar Hall School, which is a special educational needs school for those aged 4-18. There are two primary schools - Thundersley Primary School and Kingston.

== Governance ==
=== Current governance ===
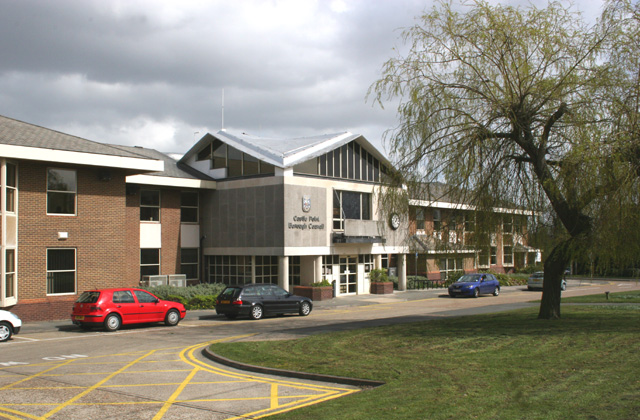
Castle Point Borough Council's headquarters on Kiln Road

Thundersley comes under two tiers of local government, Essex County Council and Castle Point Borough Council, who are based in Kiln Road in Thundersley. The village is part of the UK constituency of Castle Point, and the current MP is Dame Rebecca Harris.

=== History of governance ===
Thundersley was an ancient parish. It was subdivided into two townships: (Note: This looks like original research based on the parish having two churches, with no reference provided - this 1831 government record (Abstract of the Answers and Returns Made Pursuant to an Act Passed in the Eleventh Year of the Reign of His Majesty King George IV. Intituled "An Act for Taking an Account of the Population of Great Britain, and of the Incriease Or Diminution Thereof." · Volume 1) shows Thundersley as parish and hamlet in the Parish, township and hamlet column) Daws Heath covering the eastern third of the parish, which was in the Rochford Hundred, and a Thundersley township covering the remainder of the parish, which was in the Barstable Hundred.

When elected parish and district councils were established in 1894, Thundersley was given a parish council and included in the Rochford Rural District. In 1929 the parish and its neighbours Hadleigh and South Benfleet were removed from the rural district and united to become Benfleet Urban District. The three parishes were thereafter classed as urban parishes and so were no longer eligible to have parish councils, with the lowest elected tier of local government being Benfleet Urban District Council. In 1951 the parish of Thundersley had a population of 6,482.

The urban district council built itself a new headquarters on Kiln Road in Thundersley in 1962.

Benfleet Urban District was abolished in 1974 under the Local Government Act 1972, becoming part of the new district of Castle Point, which took over the old Benfleet Urban District Council's offices in Thundersley to serve as its headquarters. As part of the 1974 reforms, Thundersley became an unparished under Castle Point Borough Council.

== Transport ==
Thundersley is bounded by the A127 road to the north, where it borders Rayleigh, the A130 road to the west where it borders the villages of North Benfleet and Bowers Gifford. The A13 road to the south and eastwards beyond the A129 road bordering through Daws Heath, Belfairs Park in Leigh-on-Sea and Hadleigh.

The nearest railway stations are Benfleet railway station and Rayleigh railway station. The London Tilbury and Southend LT&SR 79 Class 4-4-2T No. 80 locomotive Thundersley was named after this area, and it is on exhibition at Bressingham Steam and Gardens in Norfolk, on loan from the National Railway Museum.

== Recreation ==
Football club Thundersley Rovers Sports Club was formed in 1963 and currently has a senior mens team along with junior teams for boys and girls. Since 1980 it has been based at Thundersley Common.

There are multiple parks in the area aimed at children under 12. There is one park located in Swans Green Recreation Ground, along Hart Road and another at Thundersley Great Common.

Other leisure opportunities include Runnymede Leisure Centre, which contains two swimming pools and a gym.

== Religion ==
The Parish of Thundersley has three Anglican churches: St Peter's, Thundersley, St George's, New Thundersley and St Michael's, Daws Heath the original of which has been replaced by an enhanced timber church, consecrated by the Bishop of Bradwell on 1 December 2012.)

Fully reformed Christian churches include Thundersley Congregational Church which runs as its mission The Beacon, Thundersley Gospel Hall, Daws Heath Evangelical Church and Thundersley Community Church at Cedar Hall School.

Thundersley Christian Spiritualist Church was formed in October 1933 and moved to a wooden hut on Bread and Cheese Hill in July 1947. A new building opened at the same site in 1998.

== Notable people ==
- Chessplayer, journalist and author James Mason (1849–1905), who became one the world's best half-dozen chess players in the 1880s, is buried in Thundersley churchyard.
- Novelist Fergus Hume (1859–1932), author of The Mystery of a Hansom Cab, spent the last 30 years of his life in Thundersley and is buried there.
- The writer Bernard Cornwell (b.1944), author of the Sharpe novels, grew up in Thundersley.
- The rector of Thundersley, Robert Drake was burnt at the stake in 1556 for refusing to renounce his protestant faith.

== Gallery ==
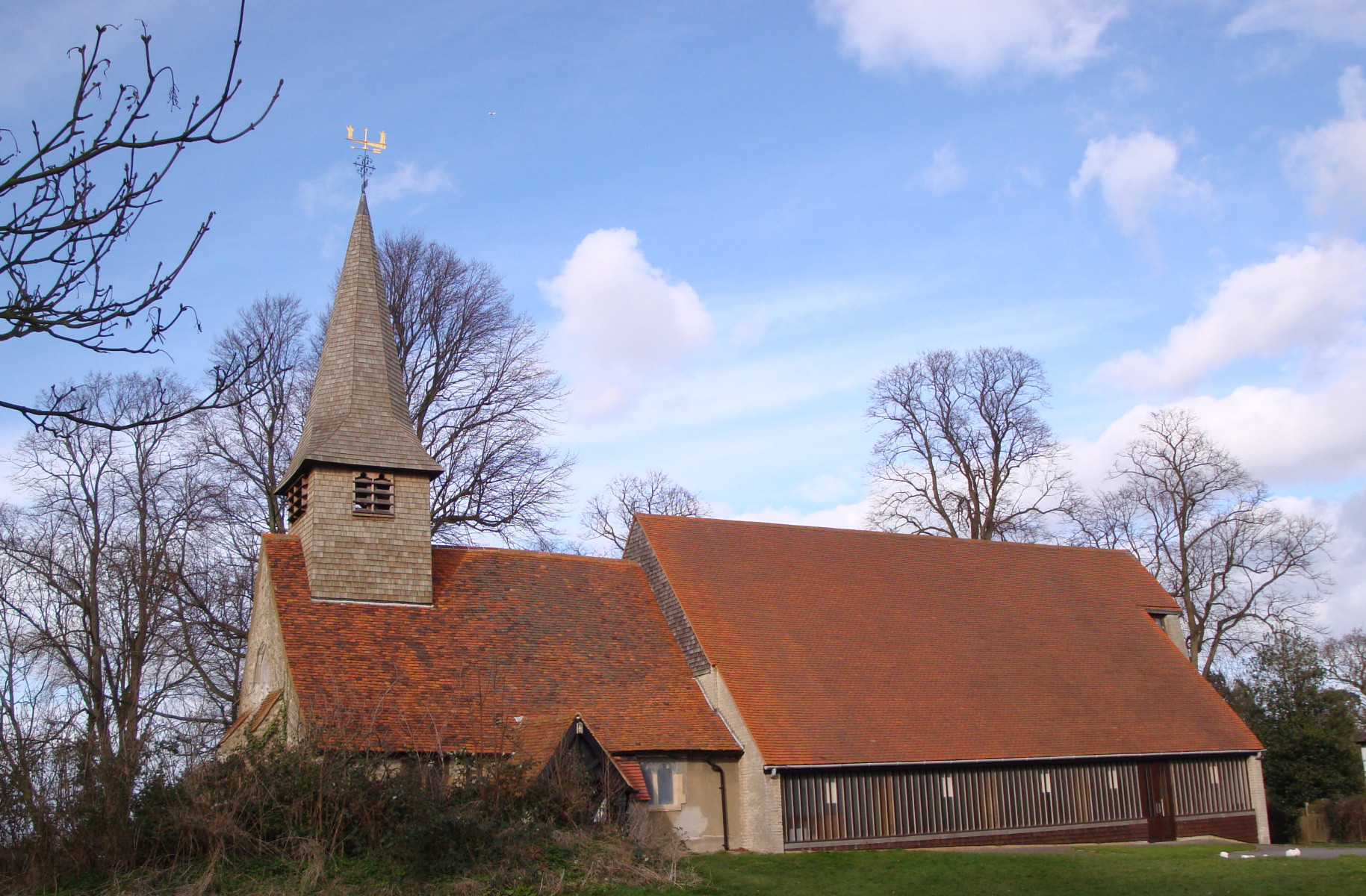
St Peter's Church Thundersley

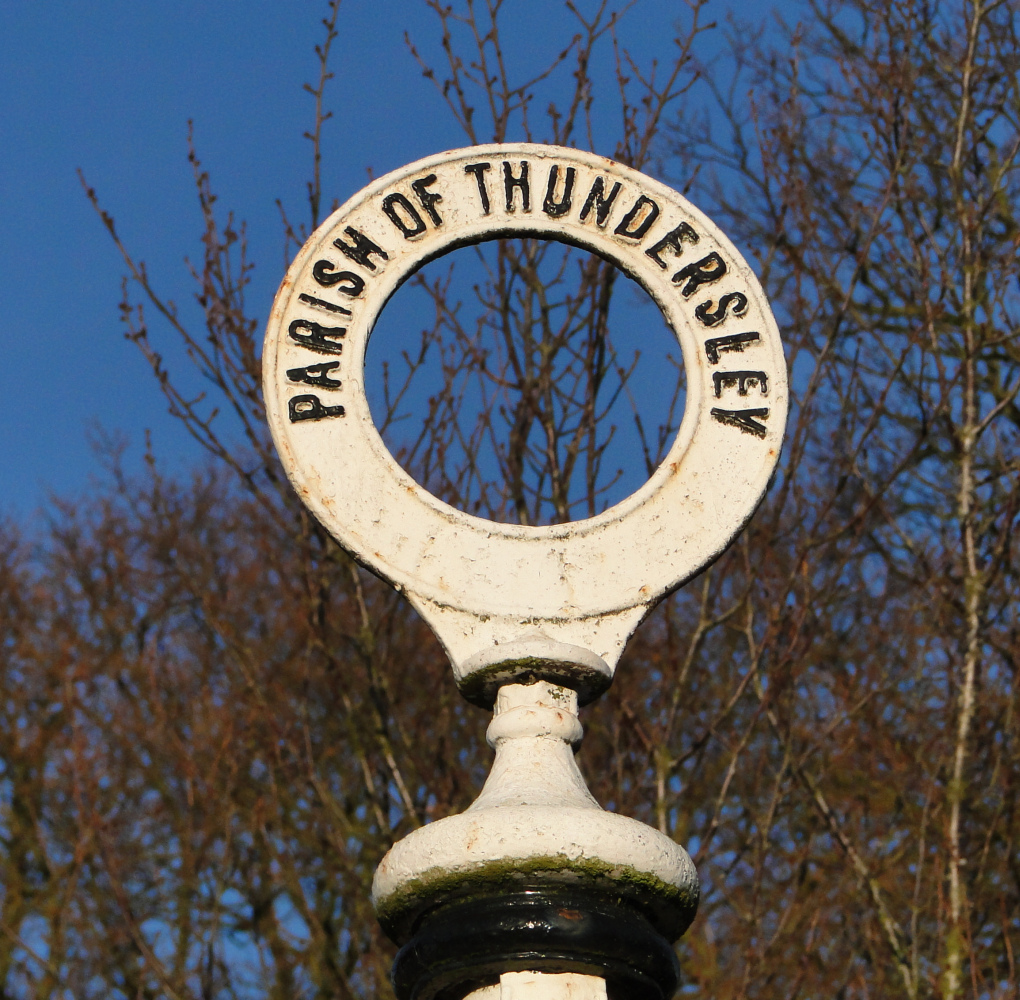
Top of old road direction sign of Thundersley
