= 2024 Castle Point Borough Council election =

Local election in Castle Point, England

- 2 May 2024

All 39 seats to Castle Point Borough Council 20 seats needed for a majority

	First party	Second party
Leader	Warren Gibson	Dave Blackwell
Party	PIP	CIIP
Last election	16 seats, 35.4%	16 seats, 20.2%
Seats before	16	16 (Note: Including one vacant seat at Canvey Island North last held by CIIP.)
Seats won	24	15
Seat change	▲8	▼1
Popular vote	23,432	10,844
Percentage	44.1%	20.4%
Swing	▲8.7%	▲0.2%
	Third party	Fourth party
Leader	Beverley Egan
Party	Conservative	Independent
Last election	9 seats, 28.5%	0 seats, 0.8%
Seats before	8	1
Seats won	0	0
Seat change	▼8	▼1
Popular vote	7,679	409
Percentage	14.5%	0.8%
Swing	▼14.1%	0.0%
- Winner of each seat at the 2024 Castle Point Borough Council election
Leader before election
Dave Blackwell
CIIP
No overall control
Leader after election
Dave Blackwell
CIIP
PIP

The 2024 Castle Point Borough Council election was held on Thursday 2 May 2024, alongside the other local elections in the United Kingdom being held on the same day. All 39 members of Castle Point Borough Council in Essex were elected following boundary changes.

Prior to the election, the council was under no overall control, being led by a coalition of two local parties, the Canvey Island Independent Party (which only contested seats on Canvey Island) and the People's Independent Party (which only contested seats on the mainland part of the borough). The election resulted in a clean sweep for the two local parties. The Conservatives lost all their seats. The People's Independent Party were left with a majority, but it was agreed that they would continue to form a joint administration with the Canvey Island Independent Party.

== Background ==
Castle Point was a traditionally Conservative council. The Conservative controlled the council from 1976 until 1995, when the Labour Party won a majority. The Conservatives retook control in 2003. This majority lasted until 2022 (aside from a period of no overall control from 2014 to 2015), when the council again fell into no overall control.

In the 2023 election, the People's Independent Party gained 6 seats with 35.4% of the vote, the Canvey Island Independent Party held the 6 seats they were defending with 20.2%, and the Conservatives lost 6 with 28.5%. Following the 2023 election, the CIIP and PIP had formed a majority coalition.

== Boundary changes ==
Castle Point usually elects its councillors in thirds, on a 4-year cycle. However, following boundary changes, all councillors will be elected to the new wards. The change reduces the number of councillors by 2. The electoral system is due to change to whole council elections every 4 years following a vote by the council.

Old wards	No. of seats	New wards	No. of seats
Appleton	3	Appleton	3
Boyce	3	Canvey Island Central	3
Canvey Island Central	3	Canvey Island East	3
Canvey Island East	3	Canvey Island North	3
Canvey Island North	3	Canvey Island South	3
Canvey Island South	3	Canvey Island Winter Gardens	3
Canvey Island West	2	Hadleigh St James	3
Canvey Island Winter Gardens	3	St George's	3
Cedar Hall	3	St Mary's	3
St George's	3	St Michael's	3
St James	3	Tarpots	3
St Mary's	3	Thundersley North	3
St Peter's	3	Thundersley South	3
Victoria	3		

== Previous council composition ==
After 2023 election		Before 2024 election		After 2024 election	
Party	Seats	Party	Seats	Party	Seats
CIIP	16	CIIP	15	CIIP	15
PIP	16	PIP	16	PIP	24
Conservative	9	Conservative	8	Conservative	0
Independent	0	Independent	1	Independent	0

Changes:

- December 2023: John Payne (CIIP) dies
- May 2023: Godfrey Isaacs leaves Conservatives to sit as an independent

== Results summary ==
Castle Point Borough Council's composition following the 2024 elections.

2024 Castle Point Borough Council election
Party	Candidates	Seats	Gains	Losses	Net gain/loss	Seats %	Votes %	Votes	+/−
PIP	24	24	0	0	▲8	61.5	44.1	23,432	+8.7
CIIP	15	15	0	0	▼1	38.5	20.4	10,844	+0.2
Conservative	22	0	0	0	▼7	0.0	14.5	7,679	–14.1
Canvey Residents' Alliance	13	0	0	0	Steady	0.0	10.3	5,472	N/A
Labour	25	0	0	0	Steady	0.0	9.3	4,972	–4.0
Independent	1	0	0	0	▼1	0.0	0.8	409	±0.0
Green	2	0	0	0	Steady	0.0	0.7	357	N/A

== Ward results ==
The Statement of Persons Nominated, which details the candidates standing in each ward, was released by Castle Point Borough Council following the close of nomination on 8 April 2024. Thirteen of the thirty-five Conservative nominations were rejected as invalid. An asterisk denotes an incumbent councillor seeking re-election.

=== Appleton ===
Electorate: 5,148

Appleton
Party	Candidate	Votes	%	±%
PIP	Lynsey McCarthy-Calvert*	854	60.4	
PIP	Diana Jones*	831	58.7	
PIP	Lorraine Larman	793	56.1	
Conservative	Wayne Johnson	504	35.6	
Conservative	Michael Dixon	441	31.2	
Conservative	Barry Webb	420	29.7	
Labour	Mark Maguire	205	14.5	
Labour	Charlie Young	196	13.9	
Turnout			29.6	
PIP hold				
PIP hold				
PIP gain from Conservative				

=== Canvey Island Central ===
Electorate: 5,905

Canvey Island Central
Party	Candidate	Votes	%	±%
CIIP	Peter May*	716	60.4	
CIIP	Lorraine Breading	683	57.6	
CIIP	Jamie Huntman	590	49.7	
Canvey Residents	Mickey Finn	479	40.4	
Canvey Residents	Sean Quartermaine	476	40.1	
Canvey Residents	Lisa Megennis	431	36.3	
Labour	Terry Miller	183	15.4	
Turnout			22.8	
CIIP hold				
CIIP hold				
CIIP hold				

=== Canvey Island East ===
Electorate: 5,839

Canvey Island East
Party	Candidate	Votes	%	±%
CIIP	Susan Brooke	910	73.0	
CIIP	Carole Sach*	876	70.2	
CIIP	Grace Watson*	809	64.9	
Canvey Residents	Michael Griffin	435	34.9	
Conservative	John Last	263	21.1	
Labour	Daniel Curtis	225	18.0	
Conservative	Rachel Ojo	224	18.0	
Turnout			25.4	
CIIP hold				
CIIP hold				
CIIP hold				

=== Canvey Island North ===
Electorate: 5,890

Canvey Island North
Party	Candidate	Votes	%	±%
CIIP	Dave Blackwell*	834	56.2	
CIIP	Michael Fuller*	732	49.3	
CIIP	Nick Harvey*	715	48.2	
Canvey Residents	Kevin Hobbs	527	35.5	
Canvey Residents	Paul Joiner	500	33.7	
Canvey Residents	Jade Pittman	473	31.9	
Conservative	Nikki Drogman	187	12.6	
Labour	Anita Duffield	168	11.3	
Conservative	Pat Haunts	162	10.9	
Labour	Brendan Duffield	152	10.2	
Turnout			27.3	
CIIP hold				
CIIP hold				
CIIP hold				

=== Canvey Island South ===
Electorate: 5,786

Canvey Island South
Party	Candidate	Votes	%	±%
CIIP	Barry Campagna*	851	62.2	
CIIP	Barry Palmer*	784	57.3	
CIIP	Janice Payne*	754	55.1	
Canvey Residents	Scott Griffin	426	31.1	
Canvey Residents	Leah Griffin	417	30.5	
Canvey Residents	Jamie Coronado	411	30.0	
Conservative	Joan Liddiard	224	16.4	
Labour	Heidi Cox	122	8.9	
Labour	Katie Curtis	116	8.5	
Turnout			25.5	
CIIP hold				
CIIP hold				
CIIP hold				

=== Canvey Island Winter Gardens ===
Electorate: 5,688

Canvey Island Winter Gardens
Party	Candidate	Votes	%	±%
CIIP	David Thomas*	551	48.6	
CIIP	Peter Greig*	548	48.3	
CIIP	Graham Withers*	491	43.3	
Canvey Residents	Michelle Griffin	335	29.5	
Canvey Residents	Natalie Lawrence	285	25.1	
Canvey Residents	Praise Coronado	277	24.4	
Conservative	Darren Brown	235	20.7	
Labour Co-op	Maggie McArthur-Curtis	184	16.2	
Labour Co-op	Moreblessing Chasiya	178	15.7	
Green	Bob Chapman	162	14.3	
Conservative	Ivor Earl	157	13.8	
Turnout			21.6	
CIIP hold				
CIIP hold				
CIIP hold				

=== Hadleigh St James ===
Electorate: 4,604

Hadleigh St James
Party	Candidate	Votes	%	±%
PIP	Kate Knott	949	71.3	
PIP	Aimme Harbinson	850	63.8	
PIP	Duncan MacPherson	791	59.4	
Conservative	Simon Hart*	464	34.8	
Conservative	Jacqui Thornton*	445	33.4	
Labour	Dina Mehdi	251	18.8	
Labour	Charlotte Reilly	245	18.4	
Turnout			33.3	
PIP win (new seat)				
PIP win (new seat)				
PIP win (new seat)				

=== St George's ===
Electorate: 4,859

St George's
Party	Candidate	Votes	%	±%
PIP	Nicola Benson*	751	63.2	
PIP	Dean Silk	552	46.5	
PIP	Nanine Pachy	509	42.8	
Independent	Steven Cole	409	34.4	
Conservative	David Cross	369	31.1	
Conservative	Paul Harbord	333	28.0	
Labour	Jackie Reilly	245	20.6	
Labour	Freddy West	202	17.0	
Green	Billy Brew	195	16.4	
Turnout			28.4	
PIP hold				
PIP gain from Conservative				
PIP gain from Conservative				

=== St Mary's ===
Electorate: 5,357

St Mary's
Party	Candidate	Votes	%	±%
PIP	Russ Savage*	1,360	78.5	
PIP	Rob Lillis*	1,351	78.0	
PIP	Sharon Ainsley*	1,322	76.3	
Conservative	Roxanne Goldfinch	390	22.5	
Labour Co-op	Laurence Chapman	285	16.5	
Labour Co-op	Joe Cooke	249	14.4	
Labour Co-op	Georgina Morgan-Bates	239	13.8	
Turnout			35.8	
PIP hold				
PIP hold				
PIP hold				

=== St Michael's ===
Electorate: 4,449

St Michael's
Party	Candidate	Votes	%	±%
PIP	John Knott*	1,450	95.0	
PIP	Warren Gibson*	1,396	91.5	
PIP	Tim Copsey*	1,387	90.9	
Labour	Amie Maguire	179	11.7	
Labour	Jacqueline Warner	165	10.8	
Turnout			38.3	
PIP win (new seat)				
PIP win (new seat)				
PIP win (new seat)				

=== Tarpots ===
Electorate: 5,575

Tarpots
Party	Candidate	Votes	%	±%
PIP	Michael Dearson*	899	68.5	
PIP	Kieron Bowker*	730	55.6	
PIP	Benn Wimbledon	678	51.7	
Conservative	Andrew Sheldon	674	51.3	
Conservative	Sunil Gupta	504	38.4	
Labour	Holly Foxen	232	17.7	
Labour	Susan Foxen	221	16.8	
Turnout			28.3	
PIP win (new seat)				
PIP win (new seat)				
PIP win (new seat)				

=== Thundersley North ===
Electorate: 5,968

Thundersley North
Party	Candidate	Votes	%	±%
PIP	Gareth Howlett*	1,408	82.1	
PIP	Steve Mountford*	1,339	78.1	
PIP	Tom Gibson*	1,298	75.7	
Conservative	Margaret Belford	382	22.3	
Conservative	Vincent White	300	17.5	
Labour	Bill Emberson	209	12.2	
Labour	Helen Emberson	209	12.2	
Turnout			31.8	
PIP win (new seat)				
PIP win (new seat)				
PIP win (new seat)				

=== Thundersley South ===
Electorate: 4,128

Thundersley South
Party	Candidate	Votes	%	±%
PIP	Allan Edwards*	652	62.2	
PIP	Matt Cortes	648	61.8	
PIP	Laurie Dixon	634	50.9	
Conservative	James Cutler	364	34.7	
Conservative	Andy Thornton*	321	30.6	
Conservative	Adrian Roper	316	30.1	
Labour	Gwyn Bailey	168	16.0	
Labour	Andrew Darling	144	13.7	
Turnout			27.9	
PIP win (new seat)				
PIP win (new seat)				
PIP win (new seat)				

== By-elections ==
=== Canvey Island Winter Gardens ===
Canvey Island Winter Gardens by-election: 29 May 2025
Party	Candidate	Votes	%	±%
Reform	Reece Langley	712	53.1	N/A
Conservative	Paul Harbord	233	17.3	+1.3
CIIP	Steve Sach	200	14.9	−22.7
Labour	Moreblessing Chasiya	131	9.8	−2.8
Green	Bob Chapman	67	5.0	−6.1
Majority		479	35.6	N/A
Turnout		1,344	23.3	+1.7
Reform gain from CIIP				

By-election triggered by the death of Canvey Island Independent Party councillor Peter Greig.
