= 2026 Essex County Council election =

2026 English local government election

- 7 May 2026

All 78 seats to Essex County Council 40 seats needed for a majority
- Registered: 1,152,546
- Turnout: 504,542; 43.8% (▲10.6%)
	First party	Second party	Third party
Leader	None	Kevin Bentley (defeated)	Michael Mackrory (died) (Note: Leader of the Lib Dem & Independent Group (7 Liberal Democrats, 2 Independents & 1 Green))
Party	Reform	Conservative	Liberal Democrats
Last election	0 seats, 0.6%	52 seats, 48.8%	8 seats, 13.8%
Seats before	1	50 (Note: Includes the vacant seat in Witham Southern, which was last held by a Conservative.)	8 (Note: Includes the vacant seat in Chelmsford Springfield last held by the Liberal Democrats.)
Seats won	53	13	6
Seat change	▲52	▼37	▼2
Popular vote	187,810	125,998	60,287
Percentage	37.3%	25.0%	12.0%
Swing	▲36.7%	▼23.8%	▼1.8%
	Fourth party	Fifth party	Sixth party
Leader	Michael Mackrory / Chris Pond (Note: Leader of the Non-Aligned Group (3 Independents, 2 R4U, 2 CIIP & 1 LRA))	Michael Mackrory	Ivan Henderson (defeated)
Party	Independent	Green	Labour
Last election	3 seats, 5.9%	1 seat, 5.6%	5 seats, 17.1%
Seats before	5	1	6
Seats won	2	1	1
Seat change	▼3	Steady	▼5
Popular vote	19,919	45,878	42,153
Percentage	4.0%	9.1%	8.4%
Swing	▼1.9%	▲3.5%	▼8.7%
	Seventh party	Eighth party	Ninth party
Leader	Chris Pond	None	Chris Pond (defeated)
Party	R4U	PIP	Loughton Residents
Last election	2 seats, 2.4%	Did not exist	1 seat, 1.2%
Seats before	2	0	1
Seats won	1	1	0
Seat change	▼1	▲1	▼1
Popular vote	7,011	5,566	4,064
Percentage	1.4%	1.1%	0.8%
Swing	▼1.0%	N/A	▼0.4%
- Winner of each seat at the 2026 Essex County Council election.
Leader before election
Kevin Bentley
Conservative
Leader after election
Peter Harris
Reform

The 2026 Essex County Council election took place on 7 May 2026 to elect members to Essex County Council in Essex, England. This took place on the same day as other local elections. Reform UK gained majority control of the county council from the Conservatives.

== Background ==
At the 2021 election, the Conservatives won an outright majority of seats on the council, maintaining overall control of the authority for a seventh consecutive term. Kevin Bentley (Stanway & Pyefleet), leader of the Conservative group, was appointed leader of the council and formed a Conservative administration.

== Boundary changes ==
Following a local government boundary review, there will be an increase in the number of councillors from 75 to 78, and a new pattern of electoral division boundaries will be used. As part of the changes, all two-member divisions will be abolished, meaning all divisions will now elect only one councillor each.

== Delay ==
The general election of councillors was due to take place on 1 May 2025. However, following the publication of the English Devolution White Paper, the majority of the members of Essex County Council voted in favour of asking the government to cancel the planned 2025 elections. The Conservative and Labour groups, in addition to the sole Loughton Residents Association councillor, voted in favour of the motion of the Conservative administration to request both that Essex County Council take part in the local government reorganisation and that the elections be delayed. The Liberal Democrat, Canvey Island Independent Party, and Residents for Uttlesford groups voted against the motion, as did the sole councillors for Reform UK and for the Rochford District Residents. The Liberal Democrat group put an amendment that would have removed the request for an election delay from the motion as a whole, but this was voted down by a show of hands without a roll call vote.

The May 2025 local elections that would have taken place were cancelled. It was announced on 22 January 2026 that the election would go ahead on 7 May 2026 following a legal challenge by Reform UK.

== Summary ==
=== Election result ===
2026 Essex County Council election
Party	Candidates	Seats	Gains	Losses	Net gain/loss	Seats %	Votes %	Votes	+/−
Reform	78	53	N/A	N/A	▲52	68.0	37.3	187,810	+36.7
Conservative	78	13	N/A	N/A	▼37	16.7	25.0	125,998	–23.8
Liberal Democrats	78	6	N/A	N/A	▼2	6.4	12.0	60,287	–1.8
Independent	17	2	N/A	N/A	▼3	1.3	4.0	19,919	–1.9
Green	71	1	N/A	N/A	Steady	1.3	9.1	45,878	+3.5
Labour	78	1	N/A	N/A	▼5	1.3	8.4	42,153	–8.7
R4U	5	1	N/A	N/A	▼1	1.3	1.2	6,271	–1.2
PIP	3	1	N/A	N/A	▲1	1.3	1.1	5,566	N/A
Loughton Residents	2	0	N/A	N/A	▼1	0.0	0.8	4,064	–0.4
Rochford Resident	3	0	N/A	N/A	Steady	0.0	0.5	2,631	–0.6
CIIP	2	0	N/A	N/A	▼2	0.0	0.4	2,073	–0.6
Residents	1	0	N/A	N/A	Steady	0.0	0.1	383	±0.0
TUSC	9	0	N/A	N/A	Steady	0.0	0.1	339	N/A
Advance UK	2	0	N/A	N/A	Steady	0.0	<0.1	164	N/A
English Democrat	1	0	N/A	N/A	Steady	0.0	<0.1	89	±0.0

== Results by local authority and ward ==
=== Basildon ===
==== Incumbents ====
Ward	Incumbent councillor	Party	Re-standing
Basildon Laindon Park & Fryerns	Jeff Henry	Conservative	No
Basildon Laindon Park & Fryerns	Patricia Reid (Note: Elected at the 2023 Basildon Laindon Park & Fryerns by-election.)	Labour	Yes
Basildon Pitsea	Aiden McGurran	Labour	No
Basildon Pitsea	Emma Callaghan (Note: Elected at the 2024 Basildon Pitsea by-election.)	Labour	No
Basildon Westley Heights	Kerry Smith	Independent	Yes
Billericay & Burstead	Anthony Hedley	Conservative	No
Billericay & Burstead	Richard Moore	Conservative	No
Wickford Crouch	Tony Ball	Conservative	Yes
Wickford Crouch	Malcolm Buckley	Conservative	No

==== Authority summary ====
Basildon borough summary
Party	Seats	+/-	Votes	%	+/-
Reform	6	▲6	23,256	40.4	+38.2
Conservative	2	▼3	15,067	26.2	–26.4
Independent	1	Steady	2,836	4.9	–2.6
Labour	0	▼3	8,612	15.0	–8.9
Green	0	Steady	4,850	8.4	N/A
Liberal Democrats	0	Steady	2,678	4.7	–5.5
TUSC	0	Steady	280	0.5	+0.4
Total	9	Steady	57,579	39.7	+9.8
Registered electors			130,687	–	–6.6

==== Division results ====
Billericay North
Party	Candidate	Votes	%
Conservative	Philip Turner	4,160	48.2
Reform	Denise Martin	2,611	30.2
Green	Stewart Goshawk	873	10.1
Liberal Democrats	Chris May	540	6.3
Labour	Peter Bunyan	456	5.3
Majority		1,549	18.0
Turnout		8,678	53.6
Registered electors		16,190	
Conservative win (new seat)			

Burstead
Party	Candidate	Votes	%
Conservative	Andrew Schrader	3,581	43.0
Reform	Phillip Bruce	3,097	37.2
Labour	Leslie Banks	673	8.1
Green	Daniel Mcgarry	638	7.7
Liberal Democrats	Peter Lancaster	322	3.9
TUSC	Elaine McDonald	22	0.3
Majority		484	5.8
Turnout		8,368	50.5
Registered electors		16,577	
Conservative win (new seat)			

Castledon & Crouch
Party	Candidate	Votes	%
Reform	Zoe Hockton	3,309	48.6
Conservative	Malcolm Buckley	1,824	26.8
Liberal Democrats	Stewart Mott	808	11.9
Labour	Stewart Blackett	448	6.6
Green	Maximillian Giddens	418	6.1
Majority		1,485	21.8
Turnout		6,830	46.2
Registered electors		14,788	
Reform win (new seat)			

Gloucester Park
Party	Candidate	Votes	%
Reform	Darren Gardner	2,038	40.9
Labour	Emma Callaghan*	1,686	33.9
Conservative	Yetunde Adeshile	646	13.0
Green	Chloe Fowler	449	9.0
Liberal Democrats	Mike Chandler	115	2.3
TUSC	Eleanor Donne	46	0.9
Majority		352	7.0
Turnout		5,005	34.7
Registered electors		14,424	
Reform win (new seat)			

Laindon Town
Party	Candidate	Votes	%
Reform	Krupa Kollabathula	2,295	44.5
Labour	Adele Brown*	1,344	26.0
Conservative	Jeff Henry	839	16.3
Green	Jessica Whitehead	459	8.9
Liberal Democrats	Stephen McCarthy	181	3.5
TUSC	Dave Murray	45	0.9
Majority		951	18.5
Turnout		5,183	34.3
Registered electors		15,113	
Reform win (new seat)			

Pitsea
Party	Candidate	Votes	%
Reform	Sue Truman	2,452	47.1
Labour	Pat Reid*	1,382	26.6
Conservative	Stuart Terson	734	14.1
Green	Michelle Savage	440	8.5
Liberal Democrats	Steven Spowart	135	2.6
TUSC	Jack Huggins	58	1.1
Majority		1,070	20.5
Turnout		5,218	33.8
Registered electors		15,434	
Reform win (new seat)			

Vange
Party	Candidate	Votes	%
Reform	Sam Journet	2,070	42.7
Labour	Gavin Callaghan	1,506	31.0
Green	Matthew Hornsby	440	9.1
Conservative	Deepak Roy	410	8.5
Independent	Lurie Cojocaru	300	6.2
Liberal Democrats	Jyothi Kurra	70	1.4
TUSC	Andrew Buxton	56	1.2
Majority		564	11.7
Turnout		4,866	31.0
Registered electors		15,700	
Reform win (new seat)			

Westley Heights
Party	Candidate	Votes	%	±%
Independent	Kerry Smith*	2,516	38.3	–22.2
Reform	Nick Palmer	2,017	30.7	N/A
Conservative	Chris Allen	671	10.2	–13.1
Labour	Brian Button	655	10.0	–0.4
Green	Sam England	531	8.1	N/A
Liberal Democrats	Steve Nice	106	1.6	–1.8
TUSC	Chris Huggins	53	0.8	±0.0
Independent	X None of the Above	20	0.3	–1.3
Majority		499	7.6	–29.6
Turnout		6,604	43.0	+8.2
Registered electors		15,376		
Independent hold				

Wickford East & Bowers Gifford
Party	Candidate	Votes	%
Reform	Steven Swaby	3,367	47.9
Conservative	Tony Ball*	2,202	31.3
Green	Sam Twigg	602	8.6
Labour	Viviane Morris	462	6.6
Liberal Democrats	Nicola Hoad	401	5.7
Majority		1,165	16.6
Turnout		7,085	45.1
Registered electors		15,714	
Reform win (new seat)			

=== Braintree ===
==== Incumbents ====
Division	Incumbent councillor	Party	Re-standing
Bocking	Lynette Bowers-Flint	Conservative	Yes
Braintree Eastern	Paul Thorogood	Green	Yes
Braintree Town	Tom Cunningham	Conservative	Yes
Halstead	Chris Siddall	Conservative	Yes
Hedingham	Peter Schwier	Conservative	Yes
Three Fields with Great Notley	Graham Butland	Conservative	No
Witham Northern	Ross Playle	Conservative	Yes
Witham Southern	Vacant	Conservative (Note: Vacant seat last held by the Conservatives.)	N/A

==== Authority summary ====
Braintree district summary
Party	Seats	+/-	Votes	%	+/-
Reform	6	▲6	20,372	38.6	N/A
Conservative	1	▼6	13,755	26.1	–25.0
Green	1	Steady	8,211	15.6	–11.7
Labour	0	Steady	4,590	8.7	–7.5
Independent	0	Steady	3,539	6.7	+6.3
Liberal Democrats	0	Steady	2,285	4.3	–0.6
Total	8	Steady	52,752	43.6	+12.0
Registered electors			121,326	–	+6.6

==== Division results ====
Bocking
Party	Candidate	Votes	%	±%
Reform	Shaun Spalding	2,681	44.0	N/A
Conservative	Lynette Bowers-Flint*	1,496	24.6	–33.7
Green	Andrea Phillips	859	14.1	+1.9
Labour	Jacqui Thurgood	754	12.4	–12.0
Liberal Democrats	Andrew Sosin	299	4.9	–0.2
Majority		1,185	19.4	N/A
Turnout		6,098	39.5	+12.2
Registered electors		15,451		
Reform gain from Conservative				

Braintree Eastern
Party	Candidate	Votes	%	±%
Green	Paul Thorogood*	3,133	46.2	–3.2
Reform	Kevin Stowe	2,148	31.7	N/A
Conservative	India Jayatillake	1,019	15.0	–23.0
Labour	Sarah Neal	320	4.7	–5.1
Liberal Democrats	Ashley Thompson	163	2.4	–0.5
Majority		985	14.5	+3.1
Turnout		6,795	49.0	+10.3
Registered electors		13,873		
Green hold				

Braintree Town
Party	Candidate	Votes	%	±%
Reform	Terry Longstaff	2,403	43.7	N/A
Conservative	George Prime	1,153	21.0	–35.9
Green	Shaun Marchant	979	17.8	+4.5
Labour	Jonathan Ayten	690	12.6	–10.8
Liberal Democrats	Richard Lee	269	4.9	–1.5
Majority		1,250	22.7	N/A
Turnout		5,504	35.7	+8.5
Registered electors		15,428		
Reform gain from Conservative				

Halstead
Party	Candidate	Votes	%	±%
Reform	Isi Rocha	3,172	42.4	N/A
Conservative	Chris Siddall*	2,119	28.3	–15.6
Green	Karl Handy	1,150	15.4	–22.7
Labour	Malcolm Fincken	737	9.9	–5.6
Liberal Democrats	Terry Sherlock	303	4.1	+1.6
Majority		1,053	14.1	N/A
Turnout		7,497	43.8	+12.8
Registered electors		17,114		
Reform gain from Conservative				

Hedingham
Party	Candidate	Votes	%	±%
Reform	Nathan Robins	2,746	36.8	N/A
Independent (Green)	Jo Beavis	2,049	27.5	N/A
Conservative	Peter Schwier*	1,876	25.2	–38.2
Labour	Christine Calver	417	5.6	–9.3
Liberal Democrats	Oliver Fenwick	370	5.0	–3.9
Majority		697	9.3	N/A
Turnout		7,482	51.3	+16.7
Registered electors		14,577		
Reform gain from Conservative				

Three Fields with Great Notley
Party	Candidate	Votes	%	±%
Reform	Carl Johnson	2,837	38.4	N/A
Conservative	Tom Cunningham	2,159	29.2	–24.6
Independent (Green)	Michael Staines	1,490	19.1	–8.4
Labour	Tom Diamond	537	7.3	–3.1
Liberal Democrats	Nicholas Wicks	453	6.1	–2.2
Majority		678	9.2	N/A
Turnout		7,510	50.0	+14.8
Registered electors		15,012		
Reform gain from Conservative				

Witham Town
Party	Candidate	Votes	%
Conservative	Ross Playle*	2,410	39.6
Reform	Tony O`Brien	1,849	30.3
Green	James Abbott	1,132	18.6
Labour	Jack Robertson	541	8.9
Liberal Democrats	Barry Fleet	162	2.7
Majority		561	9.3
Turnout		6,097	38.3
Registered electors		15,902	
Conservative win (new seat)			

Witham West & Rural
Party	Candidate	Votes	%
Reform	John Morris	2,536	43.2
Conservative	Simon Morgan	1,523	25.9
Green	Philip Hughes	958	16.3
Labour	Phil Barlow	594	10.1
Liberal Democrats	Richard Pennicard	266	4.5
Majority		1,013	17.3
Turnout		5,895	42.2
Registered electors		13,969	
Reform win (new seat)			

=== Brentwood ===
==== Authority summary ====
Brentwood borough summary
Party	Seats	+/-	Votes	%	+/-
Reform	4	▲4	11,381	38.7	+37.6
Conservative	0	▼3	7,626	26.0	–24.2
Liberal Democrats	0	▼1	6,705	22.8	–5.8
Green	0	Steady	2,027	6.9	+0.4
Labour	0	Steady	1,646	5.6	–5.5
Total	4	Steady	29,474	48.8	+12.6
Registered electors			60,420	–	+1.2

==== Division results ====
Brentwood Hutton
Party	Candidate	Votes	%	±%
Reform	Russell Quirk	2,951	39.3	N/A
Conservative	Keith Barber	2,670	35.5	−27.1
Liberal Democrats	Benjamin Rigby	946	12.6	+2.1
Green	David Hale	519	6.9	+1.6
Labour	Phil Holland	426	5.7	−5.1
Majority		281	3.8	N/A
Turnout		7,534	49.8	+15.7
Registered electors		15,143		
Reform gain from Conservative				

Brentwood North
Party	Candidate	Votes	%	±%
Reform	Chris Hossack	2,568	36.2	+34.1
Liberal Democrats	Barry Aspinell*	2,451	34.6	−13.1
Conservative	Thomas Gordon	1,319	18.6	−16.0
Green	John Hamilton	472	6.7	−0.3
Labour	Susan Kortlandt	276	3.9	−4.7
Majority		117	1.6	N/A
Turnout		7,100	48.9	+11.8
Registered electors		14,553		
Reform gain from Liberal Democrats		Swing	▲23.6	

Brentwood Rural
Party	Candidate	Votes	%	±%
Reform	Samuel Gascoyne	3,438	45.4	N/A
Conservative	Lesley Wagland	2,446	32.3	−32.5
Liberal Democrats	Darryl Sankey	1,043	13.8	−7.1
Green	Paul Jeater	403	5.3	−1.9
Labour	Richard Millwood	235	3.1	−4.0
Majority		992	13.1	N/A
Turnout		7,587	52.3	+13.0
Registered electors		14,499		
Reform gain from Conservative				

Brentwood South
Party	Candidate	Votes	%	±%
Reform	Paul Godfrey	2,424	33.6	+31.2
Liberal Democrats	David Kendall	2,265	31.4	−3.8
Conservative	Terence Brant	1,191	16.5	−21.6
Labour	Elizabeth Jerrard	709	9.8	−8.3
Green	Marc Sardinha	633	8.8	+2.6
Majority		159	2.2	N/A
Turnout		7,253	44.7	+9.6
Registered electors		16,225		
Reform gain from Conservative		Swing	▲17.5	

=== Castle Point ===
==== Authority summary ====
Castle Point borough summary
Party	Seats	+/-	Votes	%	+/-
Reform	4	▲4	13,110	44.0	+43.4
PIP	1	▲1	5,566	18.7	N/A
Conservative	0	▼3	5,664	19.0	–25.2
CIIP	0	▼2	2,073	7.0	–10.7
Green	0	Steady	1,745	5.9	N/A
Labour	0	Steady	1,198	4.0	–9.0
Liberal Democrats	0	Steady	464	1.6	–1.2
Total	5	Steady	29,848	42.8	+9.4
Registered electors			69,735	–	±0.0

==== Division results ====
Canvey Island East
Party	Candidate	Votes	%	±%
Reform	Keiron McGill	3,655	58.3	+55.3
CIIP	Dave Blackwell*	1,163	18.5	−32.8
Conservative	Henry Young	872	13.9	−22.2
Green	Leah Rowe	276	4.4	N/A
Labour	Jackie Reilly	189	3.0	−5.5
Liberal Democrats	Richard Bannister	116	1.8	+0.6
Majority		2,492	39.8	N/A
Turnout		6,280	40.8	+11.4
Registered electors		15,391		
Reform gain from CIIP		Swing	▲44.1	

Canvey Island West
Party	Candidate	Votes	%	±%
Reform	Alan Tibbit	2,761	55.3	N/A
CIIP	Peter May*	910	18.2	−31.6
Conservative	Paul Harbord	752	15.1	−23.1
Green	Bob Chapman	325	6.5	N/A
Labour	Heidi Cox	187	3.7	−8.4
Liberal Democrats	Stephen Tellis	57	1.1	N/A
Majority		1,851	37.1	N/A
Turnout		4,997	35.9	+9.5
Registered electors		13,933		
Reform gain from CIIP				

Hadleigh
Party	Candidate	Votes	%	±%
PIP	Allan Edwards	2,187	35.3	N/A
Reform	Richard Crawford	2,075	33.5	N/A
Conservative	Jacqui Thornton	1,120	18.1	−32.5
Green	Alexandra Nightingale	406	6.6	N/A
Labour	Jackie Warner	269	4.3	−8.8
Liberal Democrats	Geoffrey Duff	134	2.2	−3.4
Majority		112	1.8	N/A
Turnout		6,195	47.2	+7.9
Registered electors		13,126		
PIP gain from Conservative				

South Benfleet
Party	Candidate	Votes	%	±%
Reform	Niki Merison	2,185	34.6	N/A
Conservative	Andrew Sheldon	1,927	30.5	−17.7
PIP	Russ Savage	1,533	24.3	N/A
Green	Laurence Chapman	402	6.4	N/A
Labour	Georgina Morgan-Bates	224	3.5	−10.8
Liberal Democrats	Seb Regnier-Wilson	45	0.7	−2.1
Majority		258	4.1	N/A
Turnout		6,323	46.9	+8.9
Registered electors		13,492		
Reform gain from Conservative				

Thundersley
Party	Candidate	Votes	%	±%
Reform	Karon Phipps	2,434	40.2	N/A
PIP	Matt Cortes	1,846	30.5	N/A
Conservative	Michael Dixon	993	16.4	−28.5
Green	Christine Shaw	336	5.6	N/A
Labour	Joe Cooke	329	5.4	−9.6
Liberal Democrats	Paul Glass	112	1.9	−1.0
Majority		588	9.7	N/A
Turnout		6,053	43.9	+8.0
Registered electors		13,793		
Reform gain from Conservative				

=== Chelmsford ===
==== Authority summary ====
Chelmsford city summary
Party	Seats	+/-	Votes	%	+/-
Reform	4	▲4	20,045	33.6	N/A
Liberal Democrats	4	Steady	18,112	30.3	+1.3
Conservative	1	▼4	13,195	22.1	–26.1
Green	0	Steady	4,628	7.7	+0.6
Labour	0	Steady	2,065	3.5	–6.2
Independent	0	Steady	1,311	2.2	N/A
Residents	0	Steady	383	0.6	N/A
Total	9	Steady	59,864	44.1	+10.8
Registered electors			135,797	–	+1.6

==== Division results ====
Broomfield & Writtle
Party	Candidate	Votes	%	±%
Conservative	Mike Steel*	3,025	38.0	−25.6
Reform	Chris Davy	2,739	34.4	N/A
Liberal Democrats	Rachel Wheelhouse	1,093	13.7	+0.7
Green	Kevin Kuken	790	9.9	−0.9
Labour	Jessica Peacock	320	4.0	−8.6
Majority		286	3.6	–47.0
Turnout		7,987	49.4	+17.3
Registered electors		16,178		
Conservative hold				

Chelmer
Party	Candidate	Votes	%	±%
Reform	Robert Jerome	2,388	34.5	N/A
Liberal Democrats	Smita Rajesh	1,988	28.7	+3.4
Conservative	Rengarajan Subramanian	1,740	25.1	−34.3
Green	Mike Thompson	539	7.8	+0.8
Labour	Peter Dixon	267	3.9	−4.4
Majority		400	5.8	N/A
Turnout		6,934	41.7	+8.7
Registered electors		16,639		
Reform gain from Conservative				

Chelmsford Central
Party	Candidate	Votes	%	±%
Liberal Democrats	David Loxton	2,877	48.2	+5.1
Reform	Howard Rogers	1,498	25.1	N/A
Conservative	Nicholas Stanig	788	13.2	−26.0
Green	Reza Hossain	528	8.8	+1.2
Labour	Jonathan Legg	240	4.0	−6.0
Independent	Kamla Sangha	37	0.6	N/A
Majority		1,379	23.1	+18.7
Turnout		5,981	41.8	+7.7
Registered electors		14,307		
Liberal Democrats hold				

Chelmsford North
Party	Candidate	Votes	%	±%
Liberal Democrats	Stephen Robinson*	2,896	46.3	−0.6
Reform	Aidan Hargitt	1,864	29.8	N/A
Conservative	Stacy Seales	766	12.2	−24.3
Green	Edward Massey	495	7.9	+1.5
Labour	David Howell	236	3.8	−6.4
Majority		1,032	16.5	+6.1
Turnout		6,273	41.3	+7.7
Registered electors		15,192		
Liberal Democrats hold				

Chelmsford Springfield Poll rescheduled to 18 June 2026 due to death of a candidate.
Party	Candidate	Votes	%	±%
Liberal Democrats	Richard Lee	3,203	54.6	+8.6
Reform	Tomy Sebastian	1,616	27.5	N/A
Conservative	David John Wilkinson	723	12.3	−25.1
Green	Chris Rees	216	3.7	N/A
Labour	Adam Kenningham-Brown	110	1.9	−7.3
Majority		1,587	27.1	+18.5
Turnout		5,884	39.3	+3.8
Registered electors		14,984		
Liberal Democrats hold				

The Chelmsford Springfield poll was postponed because Liberal Democrat candidate Mike Mackrory died before polling day.

Chelmsford West
Party	Candidate	Votes	%	±%
Liberal Democrats	Hazel Clark	2,622	46.4	+0.4
Reform	Chris Wing	1,570	27.8	N/A
Conservative	Robert Adams	740	13.1	−24.3
Green	Ronnie Bartlett	536	9.5	+3.5
Labour	Jack Robinson	183	3.2	−6.0
Majority		1,052	18.6	+10.0
Turnout		5,669	42.4	+6.9
Registered electors		13,373		
Liberal Democrats hold				

Danbury & The Hanningfields
Party	Candidate	Votes	%
Reform	Paul Clark	3,369	43.1
Conservative	John Spence*	2,442	31.2
Independent	Steve Davis	663	8.5
Liberal Democrats	Sue Baker	544	7.0
Green	Angela Thomson	478	6.1
Labour	Finn Rehal	320	4.1
Majority		927	11.9
Turnout		7,827	49.6
Registered electors		15,765	
Reform win (new seat)			

Great Baddow & Galleywood
Party	Candidate	Votes	%
Reform	Kevin Bellamy	2,436	34.6
Liberal Democrats	Kieron Franks	2,402	34.1
Conservative	James Raven	970	13.8
Independent	Richard Hyland	611	8.7
Green	Amit Shah	456	6.5
Labour	Shirley Mason	161	2.3
Majority		34	0.5
Turnout		7,047	46.1
Registered electors		15,276	
Reform win (new seat)			

Woodham Ferrers
Party	Candidate	Votes	%
Reform	Christopher Benn	2,565	41.0
Conservative	Bob Massey*	2,001	32.0
Green	Alicia Cash	590	9.4
Liberal Democrats	Donna Eley	487	7.8
Residents	Keith Bentley (Note: Stood under the description South Woodham Ferrers Residents Party.)	383	6.1
Labour	Jonathan Gatenby	228	3.6
Majority		564	9.0
Turnout		6,263	44.5
Registered electors		14,086	
Reform win (new seat)			

=== Colchester ===
==== Authority summary ====
Colchester city summary
Party	Seats	+/-	Votes	%	+/-
Reform	4	▲4	16,985	29.1	+28.2
Conservative	2	▼3	13,016	22.3	–21.9
Liberal Democrats	2	Steady	10,421	17.9	–2.7
Labour	1	▼1	8,588	14.7	–9.4
Green	0	Steady	8,120	13.9	+4.0
Independent	0	Steady	1,211	2.1	N/A
Total	9	Steady	58,474	41.3	+7.6
Registered electors			141,747	–	+0.4

==== Incumbent ====
Ward	Incumbent councillor	Party	Re-standing
Abbey	Lee Scordis	Labour	Yes
Constable	Lewis Barber	Conservative	No
Drury	Sue Lissimore	Conservative	Yes
Maypole	Dave Harris	Labour	Yes
Mersea & Tiptree	John Jowers	Conservative	No
Mile End & Highwoods	David King	Liberal Democrats	Yes
Parsons Heath & East Gates	Simon Crow	Conservative	Yes
Stanway & Pyefleet	Kevin Bentley	Conservative	Yes
Wivenhoe St Andrew	Mark Cory	Liberal Democrats	Yes

==== Division results ====
Colchester Abbey
Party	Candidate	Votes	%	±%
Labour Co-op	Lee Scordis*	2,215	36.0	–9.0
Reform	Scott Alan Holman	1,649	26.8	N/A
Green	Amy Kirkby-Taylor	1,357	22.1	+4.8
Conservative	Richard Martin	487	7.9	–18.0
Liberal Democrats	Catherine Spindler	445	7.2	–3.1
Majority		566	9.2	N/A
Turnout		6,163	36.7	+6.1
Registered electors		16,772		
Labour Co-op hold				

Colchester Lexden
Party	Candidate	Votes	%	±%
Conservative	Sue Lissimore*	2,662	37.7	–18.4
Reform	Keith Coomber	1,535	21.8	N/A
Labour	Chris Coates	1,063	15.1	–6.2
Liberal Democrats	John Loxley	935	13.3	–0.3
Green	James Jefferies	864	12.2	+3.1
Majority		1,127	15.9	–18.9
Turnout		7,066	48.2	+6.2
Registered electors		14,673		
Conservative hold				

Colchester Maypole
Party	Candidate	Votes	%	±%
Reform	Max Maxwell	1,812	34.2	+32.1
Labour	Dave Harris*	1,618	30.6	–19.2
Liberal Democrats	Mick Spindler	776	14.7	–0.5
Green	Alyssa Carrington	563	10.6	+5.7
Conservative	Bevan Waghorn	523	9.9	–18.2
Majority		194	3.6	N/A
Turnout		5,298	32.8	+11.1
Registered electors		16,134		
Reform gain from Labour		Swing	▲25.7	

Colchester North
Party	Candidate	Votes	%
Liberal Democrats	David King*	2,290	35.3
Reform	Graham Wilson	1,434	22.1
Green	Kemal Çufoğlu	1,413	21.8
Conservative	Angus Allan	749	11.5
Labour	Pauline Bacon	611	9.4
Majority		856	13.2
Turnout		6,505	38.4
Registered electors		16,953	
Liberal Democrats win (new seat)			

Colchester St Johns
Party	Candidate	Votes	%
Reform	Dean Dasley	2,120	34.1
Liberal Democrats	Natalie Sommers	1,871	30.1
Conservative	Simon Crow*	830	13.3
Labour	Christine Dale	736	11.8
Green	Lisa Cross	667	10.7
Majority		249	4.0
Turnout		6,253	40.5
Registered electors		15,454	
Reform win (new seat)			

Constable
Party	Candidate	Votes	%	±%
Conservative	Sara Naylor	3,060	39.9	–27.2
Reform	Adrian Gasser	2,259	29.4	+27.1
Green	Alex McCormick	852	11.1	+0.7
Liberal Democrats	Mark Jenkins	850	11.1	+2.8
Labour	Sarah Chaker	651	8.5	–3.5
Majority		801	10.5	–44.6
Turnout		7,698	49.1	+9.5
Registered electors		15,673		
Conservative hold				

Mersea & Tiptree
Party	Candidate	Votes	%	±%
Reform	Christopher Perera	3,105	38.5	N/A
Conservative	Paul Dundas	2,934	36.4	–35.4
Green	Heidi Cornish	1,043	12.9	–0.5
Labour	Barry Gilheany	495	6.1	–3.6
Liberal Democrats	Jacqui Morley	488	6.1	+1.0
Majority		171	2.1	N/A
Turnout		8,100	48.3	+13.8
Registered electors		16,773		
Reform gain from Conservative				

Stanway & Marks Tey
Party	Candidate	Votes	%
Reform	Andrew Harding	2,092	32.7
Conservative	Kevin Bentley*	1,537	24.0
Independent	Lesley Scott-Boutell	1,211	18.9
Liberal Democrats	Amir Anbouche	612	9.6
Green	Amanda Kirke	574	9.0
Labour	John Spademan	373	5.8
Majority		555	8.7
Turnout		6,398	43.0
Registered electors		14,868	
Reform win (new seat)			

Wivenhoe St Andrew
Party	Candidate	Votes	%	±%
Liberal Democrats	Mark Cory*	2,154	43.3	+4.0
Reform	Daryl Swain	979	19.7	+18.5
Labour	Julie Young	826	16.6	–18.7
Green	Andrew Canessa	787	15.8	+6.6
Conservative	Christopher Thompson	234	4.7	–10.3
Majority		1,175	23.6	+19.6
Turnout		4,993	34.6	+6.2
Registered electors		14,447		
Liberal Democrats hold		Swing	▼7.3	

=== Epping Forest ===
==== Authority summary ====
Epping Forest district summary
Party	Seats	+/-	Votes	%	+/-
Reform	6	▲5	18,649	40.9	+40.6
Conservative	1	▼4	11,622	25.5	–25.2
Liberal Democrats	0	Steady	4,575	10.0	–1.8
Loughton Residents	0	▼1	4,064	8.9	–5.3
Labour	0	Steady	3,035	6.7	–6.3
Green	0	Steady	2,634	5.8	–2.0
Independent	0	Steady	958	2.1	N/A
English Democrat	0	Steady	89	0.2	–0.4
TUSC	0	Steady	11	<0.1	–0.2
Total	7	Steady	44,558	44.5	+11.8
Registered electors			100,065	–	–0.9

==== Division results ====
Chigwell & Buckhurst Hill East
Party	Candidate	Votes	%
Conservative	Lee Scott*	2,184	32.7
Reform	Yair Cohen	2,167	32.5
Green	Steven Neville	1,004	15.1
Independent	Lisa Morgan	748	11.2
Labour	Martin Morris	353	5.3
Liberal Democrats	Naomi Davies	216	3.2
Majority		17	0.2
Turnout		6,697	43.5
Registered electors		15,406	
Conservative win (new seat)			

Epping & Theydon Bois
Party	Candidate	Votes	%	±%
Reform	Annie O'Neill	2,833	35.4	N/A
Conservative	Holly Whitbread*	2,355	29.4	−20.7
Liberal Democrats	Razia Sharif	2,318	29.0	−13.4
Labour	Christine Mortimer	287	3.6	−4.0
Independent	William Ayrton	210	2.6	N/A
Majority		478	6.0	N/A
Turnout		8,030	53.8	+12.6
Registered electors		14,919		
Reform gain from Conservative				

Loughton North
Party	Candidate	Votes	%
Reform	Natalie Wilding-Barrett	2,359	37.1
Loughton Residents	Chris Pond*	2,191	34.5
Green	Joe Fellows	671	10.6
Conservative	Marshall Vance	605	9.5
Labour	Debbie Wild	366	5.8
Liberal Democrats	Glenn Hernandez	159	2.5
Majority		168	2.6
Turnout		6,369	41.0
Registered electors		15,526	
Reform win (new seat)			

Loughton South & Buckhurst Hill West
Party	Candidate	Votes	%
Reform	Neil Carlsson	2,054	29.7
Loughton Residents	Roger Baldwin	1,873	27.1
Conservative	Smruti Patel	1,455	21.0
Green	Joanna Garbaty	959	13.9
Labour	Alain Laviolette	358	5.2
Liberal Democrats	Ishvinder Singh	213	3.1
TUSC	Scott Jones	11	0.2
Majority		181	2.6
Turnout		6,937	49.3
Registered electors		14,073	
Reform win (new seat)			

North Weald & Nazeing
Party	Candidate	Votes	%	±%
Reform	Karen McIvor	2,684	49.8	N/A
Conservative	Christopher Whitbread*	1,716	31.9	−40.7
Liberal Democrats	Thomas Addenbrooke	524	9.7	−1.2
Labour	Alex Drummond	461	8.6	−7.9
Majority		968	17.9	N/A
Turnout		4,123	35.2	+7.1
Registered electors		11,704		
Reform gain from Conservative				

Ongar & Rural
Party	Candidate	Votes	%	±%
Reform	Jaymey McIvor*	3,892	56.1	+53.6
Conservative	Ray Balcombe	1,879	27.1	−42.5
Liberal Democrats	Monica Richardson	591	8.5	+2.9
Labour	Ann Huish	487	7.0	−3.5
English Democrat	Robin Tilbrook	89	1.3	−3.5
Majority		2,013	29.0	N/A
Turnout		6,970	49.2	+17.9
Registered electors		14,173		
Reform hold		Swing	▲48.1	

Waltham Abbey
Party	Candidate	Votes	%	±%
Reform	James Abbott	2,660	49.6	N/A
Conservative	Jodie Lucas	1,428	26.6	−30.8
Labour	Kevin Hind	723	13.5	−5.4
Liberal Democrats	Paul Tippett	554	10.3	+7.3
Majority		1,232	23.0	N/A
Turnout		5,432	38.1	+11.2
Registered electors		14,264		
Reform gain from Conservative				

=== Harlow ===
==== Authority summary ====
Harlow district summary
Party	Seats	+/-	Votes	%	+/-
Conservative	5	▲1	13,969	52.1	–2.3
Reform	0	Steady	5,990	22.3	N/A
Labour	0	Steady	3,703	13.8	–21.4
Green	0	Steady	2,596	9.7	N/A
Liberal Democrats	0	Steady	504	1.9	–2.8
TUSC	0	Steady	48	0.2	N/A
Total	5	▲1	26,922	40.4	+8.2
Registered electors			66,593	–	+4.5

==== Division results ====
Harlow Common & Church Langley
Party	Candidate	Votes	%
Conservative	Andrew Johnson*	3,708	54.9
Reform	Gary Swaile	1,625	24.1
Labour	Rosanna Jackson	770	11.4
Green	Paul King	544	8.1
Liberal Democrats	Paul Ward	111	1.6
Majority		2,083	30.8
Turnout		6,786	42.8
Registered electors		15,856	
Conservative win (new seat)			

Harlow Netteswell
Party	Candidate	Votes	%
Conservative	Nicky Purse	2,617	45.3
Reform	Mark Gough	1,339	23.2
Labour Co-op	Kay Morrison	968	16.7
Green	Julie Taylor	718	12.4
Liberal Democrats	Lesley Rideout	141	2.4
Majority		1,278	22.1
Turnout		5,822	38.3
Registered electors		15,215	
Conservative win (new seat)			

Harlow Pardon & Toddbrook
Party	Candidate	Votes	%
Conservative	Michael Hardware*	1,742	41.8
Reform	Scott Hegley	943	22.6
Labour	Stefan Mullard-Toal	882	21.2
Green	David Margetts	517	12.4
Liberal Democrats	Meena Kumar	85	2.0
Majority		799	19.2
Turnout		4,197	36.9
Registered electors		11,371	
Conservative win (new seat)			

Harlow South West
Party	Candidate	Votes	%
Conservative	Clive Souter*	3,673	61.4
Reform	Jamie Winslow	996	16.6
Labour Co-op	Jake Shepherd	690	11.5
Green	Julie Bull	507	8.5
Liberal Democrats	David Martin	94	8.5
TUSC	Andrew Hammond	25	0.4
Majority		2,677	44.8
Turnout		5,994	40.7
Registered electors		14,741	
Conservative win (new seat)			

Old Harlow
Party	Candidate	Votes	%
Conservative	Michael Garnett*	2,229	54.2
Reform	Tracy Cranfield	1,087	26.4
Labour	Liam Kerrigan	393	9.6
Green	Jennifer Steadman	310	7.5
Liberal Democrats	Kairan Laver	73	1.8
TUSC	Paul Lenihan	23	0.6
Majority		1,142	27.8
Turnout		4,123	43.8
Registered electors		9,410	
Conservative win (new seat)			

=== Maldon ===
==== Authority summary ====
Maldon district summary
Party	Seats	+/-	Votes	%	+/-
Reform	3	▲3	9,650	39.2	N/A
Independent	1	Steady	3,820	15.5	–11.8
Conservative	0	▼2	5,861	23.8	–23.4
Liberal Democrats	0	Steady	2,631	10.7	+1.4
Green	0	Steady	1,889	7.7	+0.6
Labour	0	Steady	785	3.2	–4.7
Total	4	▲1	24,692	46.1	+11.1
Registered electors			53,567	–	+4.6

==== Division results ====
Burnham & Southminster
Party	Candidate	Votes	%	±%
Independent	Wendy Stamp*	2,354	41.2	−7.2
Reform	Nigel Betts	2,255	39.5	N/A
Conservative	Gary Duce	566	9.9	−25.4
Green	Simon Mills	259	4.5	−0.3
Labour	Jackie Brown	142	2.5	−3.2
Liberal Democrats	Robert Jones	139	2.4	+0.2
Majority		99	1.7	–11.4
Turnout		5,731	44.2	+10.1
Registered electors		12,955		
Independent hold				

Maldon Rural North
Party	Candidate	Votes	%
Reform	Stuart Clarke	2,613	41.6
Conservative	Mark Durham*	1,890	30.1
Green	Isobel Doubleday	799	12.7
Liberal Democrats	Nick Spenceley	677	10.8
Labour	Helen Wightwick	303	4.8
Majority		723	11.5
Turnout		6,299	47.3
Registered electors		13,309	
Reform win (new seat)			

Maldon Rural South
Party	Candidate	Votes	%
Reform	Justin Jay	2,699	42.6
Conservative	Jane Fleming*	1,761	27.8
Independent	Linda Haywood	855	13.5
Green	Richard George	352	5.6
Liberal Democrats	James Eley	302	4.8
Independent	Mark Bassenger	200	3.2
Labour	Felix Preston	161	2.5
Majority		938	14.8
Turnout		6,342	47.9
Registered electors		13,243	
Reform win (new seat)			

Maldon Town & Heybridge
Party	Candidate	Votes	%
Reform	Samuel Cousins	2,083	33.0
Conservative	James Burrell-Cook	1,644	26.1
Liberal Democrats	John Driver	1,513	24.0
Green	James Reece-Ford	479	7.6
Independent	Kevin Lagan	411	6.5
Labour	Stephen Capper	179	2.8
Majority		439	6.9
Turnout		6,320	45.0
Registered electors		14,060	
Reform win (new seat)			

=== Rochford ===
==== Incumbents ====
Ward	Incumbent councillor	Party	Re-standing
Rayleigh North	James Newport (Note: Elected at the 2022 Rayleigh North by-election.)	Liberal Democrats	Yes
Rayleigh South	June Lumley	Conservative	No
Rochford North	Laureen Shaw	Conservative	Yes
Rochford South	Mike Steptoe	Conservative	Yes
Rochford West	Michael Hoy (Note: Originally elected as a Rochford District Resident, but left the party to sit as an independent and subsequently joined the Liberal Democrats.)	Liberal Democrats	Yes

==== Authority summary ====
Rochford district summary
Party	Seats	+/-	Votes	%	+/-
Reform	5	▲5	13,002	40.7	N/A
Conservative	0	▼3	7,364	23.0	–22.9
Liberal Democrats	0	▼2	5,171	16.2	–3.5
Rochford Resident	0	Steady	2,631	8.2	–11.2
Green	0	Steady	1,922	6.0	N/A
Labour	0	Steady	1,657	5.2	–7.0
Independent	0	Steady	221	0.7	–2.1
Total	5	Steady	31,968	46.5	+12.4
Registered electors			69,074	–	+2.5

==== Division results ====
Rayleigh South
Party	Candidate	Votes	%	±%
Reform	Adi Malviya	2,545	38.6	N/A
Conservative	Simon Smith	1,769	26.9	–21.5
Liberal Democrats	Andy Cross	1,394	21.2	–17.8
Green	Charles Joynson	417	6.3	N/A
Labour	David Bodimeade	242	3.7	–8.9
Independent	Richard Linden	221	3.4	N/A
Majority		776	11.7	N/A
Turnout		6,622	49.2	+11.7
Registered electors		13,454		
Reform gain from Conservative				

Rayleigh West
Party	Candidate	Votes	%
Reform	Stuart Prior	2,404	39.7
Liberal Democrats	James Newport*	1,608	26.6
Conservative	Craig Rimmer	1,078	17.8
Green	Debra Lawrence	366	6.1
Rochford Resident	Vilma Wilson	361	6.0
Labour	Stephen Cooper	233	3.9
Majority		796	13.1
Turnout		6,071	45.1
Registered electors		13,473	
Reform win (new seat)			

Rochford East
Party	Candidate	Votes	%
Reform	James Cottis	2,630	43.4
Conservative	Mike Steptoe*	2,045	33.8
Green	Chris Taylor	604	10.0
Labour	Shona Hyde-Williams	483	8.0
Liberal Democrats	Matthew O'Leary	296	4.9
Majority		585	9.6
Turnout		6,087	44.5
Registered electors		13,691	
Reform win (new seat)			

Rochford North
Party	Candidate	Votes	%
Reform	Sophie Preston-Hall	2,829	39.6
Liberal Democrats	Michael Hoy*	1,544	21.6
Conservative	Simon Wootton	1,241	17.4
Rochford Resident	Adrian Eves	1,205	16.9
Labour	Ian Rooke	328	4.6
Majority		1,285	18.0
Turnout		7,184	49.2
Registered electors		14,590	
Reform win (new seat)			

Rochford South
Party	Candidate	Votes	%	±%
Reform	Tino Callaghan	2,594	42.4	N/A
Conservative	Laureen Shaw*	1,231	20.1	–43.4
Rochford Resident	Nick Booth	1,065	17.4	N/A
Green	Philip Hannan	535	8.7	N/A
Labour	James Hedges	371	6.1	–15.6
Liberal Democrats	Mike Sutton	329	5.4	–9.4
Majority		1,363	22.3	N/A
Turnout		6,143	44.3	+16.0
Registered electors		13,866		
Reform gain from Conservative				

=== Tendring ===
==== Authority summary ====
Tendring district summary
Party	Seats	+/-	Votes	%	+/-
Reform	8	▲8	24,709	47.0	+46.4
Conservative	0	▼6	9,186	17.5	–33.2
Independent	0	▼1	6,023	11.5	–0.1
Labour	0	▼1	4,570	8.7	–8.1
Green	0	Steady	4,005	7.6	+3.7
Liberal Democrats	0	Steady	3,904	7.4	–1.5
Advance UK	0	Steady	164	0.3	N/A
Total	8	Steady	52,659	43.2	+11.4
Registered electors			121,906	–	+5.2

==== Division results ====
Brightlingsea
Party	Candidate	Votes	%	±%
Reform	Aimee Keteca	2,198	32.1	N/A
Independent	Mat Court	1,671	24.4	−4.7
Liberal Democrats	Gary Scott	1,354	19.8	+0.4
Conservative	Ric Morgan	903	13.2	−31.4
Green	Ben Harvey	504	7.4	N/A
Labour	Oli Mupenda	211	3.1	−3.8
Majority		527	7.7	N/A
Turnout		6,856	45.7	+11.0
Registered electors		14,993		
Reform gain from Conservative				

Clacton North
Party	Candidate	Votes	%	±%
Reform	Peter Harris	3,513	56.9	+52.2
Independent	Mark Stephenson*	1,046	16.9	+7.5
Conservative	Mick Skeels*	578	9.4	−41.2
Green	Alex Greenwood	496	8.0	+2.7
Labour	Joanne Rosser	301	4.9	−12.5
Liberal Democrats	Katherine Hornby	191	3.1	N/A
Advance UK	Lynnette Grimwood	50	0.8	N/A
Majority		2,467	40.0	N/A
Turnout		6,200	37.4	+15.9
Registered electors		16,597		
Reform gain from Conservative		Swing	▲22.4	

Clacton South
Party	Candidate	Votes	%
Reform	Mark Webster	3,700	55.4
Independent	Adrian Smith	1,297	19.4
Conservative	Chris Amos	629	9.4
Green	Jonathan Salisbury	540	8.1
Labour	Barry Page	376	5.6
Liberal Democrats	Jeremy Talbot	136	2.0
Majority		2,403	36.0
Turnout		6,685	39.5
Registered electors		16,908	
Reform win (new seat)			

Clacton West & St Osyth
Party	Candidate	Votes	%	±%
Reform	Bradley Thompson	3,825	60.8	N/A
Conservative	Joe Holmes	904	14.4	−43.6
Independent	Carrie Doyle	598	9.5	N/A
Green	Tracey Osben	416	6.6	+2.2
Labour	Karen Creavin	308	4.9	−10.2
Liberal Democrats	Joshua Hadley	128	2.0	−2.2
Advance UK	Tony Mack	114	1.8	N/A
Majority		2,921	46.4	N/A
Turnout		6,307	38.6	+11.5
Registered electors		16,329		
Reform gain from Conservative				

Frinton & Walton
Party	Candidate	Votes	%	±%
Reform	Melanie Moakson	3,400	46.7	N/A
Independent	Pierre Oxley	1,411	19.4	+14.2
Conservative	Mark Cossens	1,347	18.5	−37.2
Green	Steven Walker	508	7.0	+1.2
Labour	Thea Roper	409	5.6	−4.2
Liberal Democrats	Helen Fontaine	198	2.7	+0.6
Majority		1,989	27.3	N/A
Turnout		7,282	51.5	+14.0
Registered electors		14,131		
Reform gain from Conservative				

Harwich
Party	Candidate	Votes	%	±%
Reform	Linda McKenzie	2,582	43.9	N/A
Labour	Ivan Henderson*	2,232	38.0	−18.8
Conservative	Lizi Ninnim	544	9.3	−28.9
Green	Natasha Osben	374	6.4	N/A
Liberal Democrats	Helen Mealing	143	2.4	−2.6
Majority		350	5.9	N/A
Turnout		5,885	39.1	+7.5
Registered electors		15,047		
Reform gain from Labour				

Tendring Rural East
Party	Candidate	Votes	%	±%
Reform	Jeff Bray	3,297	47.7	N/A
Conservative	Dan Land*	2,661	38.5	−27.8
Green	Erin Leybourne	428	6.2	+0.7
Labour	Val Cooke	331	4.8	−11.2
Liberal Democrats	Barrie Coker	193	2.8	−4.0
Majority		636	9.2	N/A
Turnout		6,916	49.6	+17.2
Registered electors		13,947		
Reform gain from Conservative				

Tendring Rural West
Party	Candidate	Votes	%	±%
Reform	Pat Murray	2,194	33.7	N/A
Conservative	Zoe Fairley	1,620	24.9	−30.4
Liberal Democrats	Terry Barrett	1,561	24.0	−0.7
Green	Holly Turner	739	11.3	+4.2
Labour	Isa Smith	402	6.2	−4.9
Majority		574	8.8	N/A
Turnout		6,528	46.8	+11.2
Registered electors		13,954		
Reform gain from Conservative				

=== Uttlesford ===
==== Authority summary ====
Uttlesford district summary
Party	Seats	+/-	Votes	%	+/-
Reform	3	▲3	10,661	31.0	N/A
Conservative	1	▼1	9,673	28.1	–11.4
R4U	1	▼1	6,271	18.2	–18.3
Green	0	Steady	3,251	9.5	+2.6
Liberal Democrats	0	Steady	2,837	8.2	–2.5
Labour	0	Steady	1,704	5.0	–1.5
Total	5	▲1	35,228	48.3	+9.6
Registered electors			72,997	–	+6.0

==== Division results ====
Dunmow
Party	Candidate	Votes	%	±%
Reform	Kevin Mordrick	2,950	39.1	N/A
Conservative	Colin Todd	2,231	29.5	−21.2
R4U	Sandi Merifield	829	11.0	−21.8
Green	Max Buckland	596	7.9	+2.0
Liberal Democrats	Richard Silcock	584	7.7	+3.2
Labour	Ben Cavanagh	360	4.8	−1.3
Majority		719	9.6	N/A
Turnout		7,573	47.9	+13.5
Registered electors		15,799		
Reform gain from Conservative				

Saffron Walden
Party	Candidate	Votes	%	±%
R4U	Paul Gadd*	2,857	38.0	−5.9
Reform	Heather Asker	1,395	18.6	N/A
Conservative	David Sadler	1,335	17.8	−13.4
Green	Edward Gildea	1,043	13.9	+5.3
Labour	Jane Berney	541	7.2	−1.6
Liberal Democrats	Jennie Lardge	339	4.5	−3.0
Majority		1,462	19.4	+6.7
Turnout		7,539	47.0	
Registered electors		16,045		
R4U hold				

Stansted
Party	Candidate	Votes	%	±%
Conservative	Raymond Gooding*	2,277	30.1	−7.9
Reform	Philip Hoy	1,926	25.4	N/A
Liberal Democrats	Geoffrey Sell	1,297	17.1	−3.4
R4U	Bianca Donald	1,033	13.6	−16.0
Green	David Radford	655	8.7	+2.6
Labour	Liam Arora	380	5.0	−0.9
Majority		351	4.7	–3.7
Turnout		7,583	50.4	+10.1
Registered electors		15,043		
Conservative hold				

Takeley
Party	Candidate	Votes	%
Reform	Geoff Bagnell	2,227	39.6
Conservative	Susan Barker*	2,126	37.8
R4U	Maggie Sutton	423	7.5
Green	Madeleine Radford	400	7.1
Liberal Democrats	Lorraine Flawn	252	4.5
Labour	Lanie Shears	195	3.5
Majority		101	1.8
Turnout		5,633	46.7
Registered electors		12,071	
Reform win (new seat)			

Thaxted
Party	Candidate	Votes	%	±%
Reform	Bo Davis	2,163	31.4	N/A
R4U	Martin Foley*	1,869	27.1	−12.7
Conservative	John Moran	1,704	24.7	−13.5
Green	Paul Allington	557	8.1	+1.4
Liberal Democrats	Patrick O'Brien	365	5.3	−5.3
Labour	Oliver Winters	228	3.3	−1.4
Majority		294	4.3	N/A
Turnout		6,900	49.1	+10.3
Registered electors		14,039		
Reform gain from R4U				

== Changes 2026–2027 ==
=== By-elections ===
==== Rayleigh West ====
Rayleigh West by-election: 18 June 2026 Resignation of Stuart Prior (Reform)
Party	Candidate	Votes	%	±%
Conservative	Stuart Belton	1,515	35.4	+17.6
Liberal Democrats	James Newport	1,262	29.5	+2.9
Reform	Denise Martin	1,046	24.4	−15.3
Green	Liam Lonergan	225	5.3	−0.8
Independent	Jamie Burton	117	2.7	N/A
Labour	Stephen Cooper	85	2.0	−1.9
Independent	Mike Webb	35	0.8	N/A
Majority		253	5.9	N/A
Turnout		4,302	31.9	–13.2
Registered electors		13,503		
Conservative gain from Reform		Swing	▲7.4	

The Rayleigh West by-election was triggered by Stuart Prior's resignation shortly after the 7 May election, following criticism of offensive social-media posts; the same resignation also triggered a by-election in the Sweyne Park and Grange ward of Rochford District Council.
