= 2003 Castle Point Borough Council election =

Map of the results of the 2003 Castle Point Borough Council election. Conservative in blue and Labour in red.

The 2003 Castle Point Borough Council election took place on 1 May 2003 to elect members of Castle Point Borough Council in Essex, England. The whole council was up for election after boundary changes increased the number of seats by 2. The Conservative party gained overall control of the council from the Labour party.

== Election result ==
The Conservatives took control of the council after gaining 22 seats to have 39 of the 41 councillors. Meanwhile, Labour was reduced to only 2 councillors after losing 19 seats. Overall turnout at the election was 26.8%, down from 32% at the 1999 election.

Among the Labour councillors to be defeated were the leader of the council Dave Wells and the mayor Charles Smith.

Castle Point local election result 2003
Party	Seats	Gains	Losses	Net gain/loss	Seats %	Votes %	Votes	+/−
Conservative	39			+22	95.1	60.8	31,753	
Labour	2			-19	4.9	37.6	19,641	
Green	0			0	0	1.2	621	
Independent	0			-1	0	0.3	178	
Socialist Alliance	0			0	0	0.1	47	

== Ward results ==
Appleton (3 seats)
Party	Candidate	Votes	%	±%
Conservative	Eugene Egan	864		
Conservative	Pamela Freeman	840		
Conservative	Thomas Skipp	830		
Labour	Michael Gamble	615		
Labour	John Trollope	587		
Labour	Lorna Trollope	566		
Turnout		4,302	30.1	

Boyce (3 seats)
Party	Candidate	Votes	%	±%
Conservative	Wendy Goodwin	1,069		
Conservative	Gail Boland	1,039		
Conservative	Christopher Freeman	1,014		
Labour	John Hart	390		
Labour	Frank Callow	380		
Labour	Gilian Wilson	372		
Turnout		4,264	28.4	

Canvey Island Central (3 seats)
Party	Candidate	Votes	%	±%
Labour	David Blackwell	621		
Conservative	Jane King	586		
Labour	Terry Blackwell	584		
Conservative	Laurence Martin	578		
Conservative	Terry Sessions	556		
Labour	Barry Dixie	551		
Turnout		3,476	22.7	

Canvey Island East (3 seats)
Party	Candidate	Votes	%	±%
Conservative	Geoffrey Coates	655		
Conservative	Shirley Coates	633		
Conservative	Lionel Hart	629		
Labour	Jackie Reilly	593		
Labour	Mark Reilly	561		
Labour	Sarah Beales	542		
Green	Christopher Keene	135		
Turnout		3,748	25.5	

Canvey Island North (3 seats)
Party	Candidate	Votes	%	±%
Conservative	Matthew Howard	560		
Conservative	Patricia Haunts	511		
Conservative	Heather Searle	510		
Labour	John Payne	449		
Labour	William Deal	448		
Labour	Kenneth Finch	433		
Turnout		2,911	20.0	

Canvey Island South (3 seats)
Party	Candidate	Votes	%	±%
Conservative	Mark Howard	855		
Conservative	Sylvia Waymark	818		
Conservative	Jeffrey Stanley	791		
Labour	Mike Curham	477		
Labour	Adrian Fletcher	457		
Labour	Lynne Fletcher	447		
Green	Clifford Hughes	152		
Turnout		3,997	27.2	

Canvey Island West (2 seats)
Party	Candidate	Votes	%	±%
Conservative	Raymond Howard	902		
Conservative	Anthony Belford	769		
Labour	Christine Andrews	190		
Labour	Heidi Cox	182		
Green	Irene Willis	75		
Turnout		2,118	29.5	

Canvey Island Winter Gardens (3 seats)
Party	Candidate	Votes	%	±%
Conservative	Norman Bambridge	575		
Conservative	Dorothy Best	563		
Conservative	Lance Munt	517		
Labour	Katie Curtis	373		
Labour	Jane David	366		
Labour	William Green	355		
Independent	Norman Garnett	178		
Socialist Alliance	Robert Chapman	47		
Turnout		2,974	20.5	

Cedar Hall (3 seats)
Party	Candidate	Votes	%	±%
Conservative	Peter Burch	967		
Conservative	Norman Smith	931		
Conservative	Norman Ladzrie	914		
Labour	Jennifer Howlett	434		
Labour	George Wilson	418		
Labour	Charles Smith	416		
Turnout		4,080	30.3	

St Georges (3 seats)
Party	Candidate	Votes	%	±%
Conservative	Jacqueline Govier	720		
Conservative	Andrew Cole	689		
Conservative	Terence Turpin	653		
Labour	Joseph Cooke	642		
Labour	David Wells	626		
Labour	Roy English	606		
Turnout		3,936	28.5	

St James (3 seats)
Party	Candidate	Votes	%	±%
Conservative	Tony Thomas	964		
Conservative	Godfrey Isaacs	884		
Conservative	W Sharp	799		
Labour	John West	361		
Labour	Godfrey Harris	352		
Labour	Harry Brett	345		
Green	Douglas Copping	259		
Turnout		3,964	28.2	

St Marys (3 seats)
Party	Candidate	Votes	%	±%
Conservative	Kathleen Meager	764		
Conservative	Lisa Preston	734		
Conservative	David Cross	719		
Labour	Brian Wilson	715		
Labour	Anthony Wright	686		
Labour	Daniel Regan	685		
Turnout		4,303	29.0	

St Peters (3 seats)
Party	Candidate	Votes	%	±%
Conservative	William Dick	948		
Conservative	Pamela Challis	924		
Conservative	Beverley Egan	912		
Labour	John Hawkins	564		
Labour	Matthew Thomas	508		
Labour	Adrian Hobden	481		
Turnout		4,337	29.6	

Victoria (3 seats)
Party	Candidate	Votes	%	±%
Conservative	Colin Riley	868		
Conservative	Clifford Brunt	861		
Conservative	Enid Isaacs	838		
Labour	Frederick Jones	433		
Labour	Robert Peters	427		
Labour	Philip Brunt	403		
Turnout		3,830	29.1	
