= 1999 Castle Point Borough Council election =

1999 UK local government election

The 1999 Castle Point Borough Council election took place on 6 May 1999 to elect members of Castle Point Borough Council in Essex, England. The whole council was up for election and the Labour Party stayed in overall control of the council.

== Background ==
Before the election Labour controlled the council with 32 councillors, compared to 5 for the Conservatives and 2 seats were vacant. This came after Labour had won a majority at the 1995 election gaining 30 seats from the Conservatives and meant the Conservatives required a swing of over 10% to take back control.

Both the Conservative and Labour parties contested every ward, while the Green Party had 3 candidates. Meanwhile, the Liberal Democrats did not stand any candidates at the election, despite having put up over a dozen candidates in 1995.

== Election result ==
Labour held onto control of the council with 24 councillors, but lost 10 seats to the Conservatives who finished with 15 seats. Most of the Conservative advances came in Benfleet, where they picked up 6 seats. Meanwhile, the Conservatives gained both seats in Canvey South after 2 recounts, with the final result in that ward being announced the day after the election. Overall turnout at the election was 32%.

Castle Point local election result 1999
Party	Seats	Gains	Losses	Net gain/loss	Seats %	Votes %	Votes	+/−
Labour	24	0	10	-10	61.5			
Conservative	15	10	0	+10	38.5			
Green	0	0	0	0	0.0			

== Ward results ==
Canvey South (2 seats)
Party	Candidate	Votes	%	±%
Conservative	Sylvia Waymark	598		
Conservative	Jeffrey Stanley	596		
Labour	Lynne Fletcher	592		
Labour	Terry Norman	590		
Green	Chris Keene	62		
Green	Hollie Coley	61		
Turnout		2,499		
Conservative gain from Labour		Swing		
Conservative gain from Labour		Swing		

== By-elections between 1999 and 2003 ==
St. Georges By-Election 19 July 2001
Party	Candidate	Votes	%	±%
Labour		712	53.9	−5.1
Conservative		609	46.1	+5.1
Majority		103	7.8	
Turnout		1,321	24	
Labour hold		Swing		
