= 2022 Castle Point Borough Council election =

2022 UK local government election

| ← 2021 | 5 May 2022 | 2023 → |

14 out of 41 seats to Castle Point Borough Council 21 seats needed for a majority

| | First party | Second party | Third party |
|---|---|---|---|
| Leader | Dave Blackwell | Andrew Sheldon | Steve Cole |
| Party | CIIP | Conservative | PIP |
| Last election | 16 seats, 14.4% | 21 seats, 42.7% | N/A |
| Seats before | 16 | 21 | 4 |
| Seats won | 5 | 3 | 6 |
| Seats after | 16 | 15 | 10 |
| Seat change | Steady | ▼6 | ▲6 |
| Popular vote | 4,295 | 7,883 | 6,160 |
| Percentage | 19.9% | 36.6% | 28.6% |
| Swing | ▲5.5% | ▼6.1% | N/A |
- Map of the 2022 Castle Point borough election results
Council control before election
Conservative
Council control after election
No overall control

The 2022 Castle Point Borough Council election took place on 5 May 2022 to elect members of Castle Point Borough Council in England.

== Results summary ==
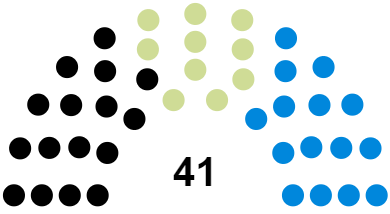
Makeup of the Castle Point borough council after the 2022 election

2022 Castle Point Borough Council election
| Party | This election | | | Full council | | | This election | | |
| Party | Seats | Net | Seats % | Other | Total | Total % | Votes | Votes % | +/− |
|---|---|---|---|---|---|---|---|---|---|
| CIIP | 5 | Steady | 35.7 | 11 | 16 | 39.0 | 4,295 | 19.9 | +5.5 |
| Conservative | 3 | ▼6 | 21.4 | 12 | 15 | 36.6 | 7,883 | 36.6 | -6.1 |
| PIP | 6 | ▲6 | 42.9 | 4 | 10 | 24.4 | 6,160 | 28.6 | New |
| Labour | 0 | Steady | 0.0 | 0 | 0 | 0.0 | 3,067 | 14.2 | +0.6 |
| Independent | 0 | Steady | 0.0 | 0 | 0 | 0.0 | 129 | 0.6 | -26.5 |
| Heritage | 0 | Steady | 0.0 | 0 | 0 | 0.0 | 23 | 0.1 | New |

== Ward results ==
=== Appleton ===
Appleton
| Party | Candidate | Votes | % | ±% |
|---|---|---|---|---|
| PIP | Lynsey McCarthy-Calvert | 798 | 45.1 | N/A |
| Conservative | Wayne Johnson | 732 | 41.4 | −11.8 |
| Labour | Toni Rocha Filho | 239 | 13.5 | +0.1 |
| Majority | | 66 | 3.7 | |
| Turnout | | 1,769 | | |
| PIP gain from Conservative | | Swing | N/A | |

=== Boyce ===
Boyce
| Party | Candidate | Votes | % | ±% |
|---|---|---|---|---|
| PIP | Allan Edwards | 902 | 48.0 | N/A |
| Conservative | Jack Fortt | 783 | 41.6 | −3.6 |
| Labour | Gwyn Bailey | 196 | 10.4 | +1.1 |
| Majority | | 119 | 6.4 | |
| Turnout | | 1,881 | | |
| PIP gain from Conservative | | Swing | N/A | |

=== Canvey Island Central ===
Canvey Island Central
| Party | Candidate | Votes | % | ±% |
|---|---|---|---|---|
| CIIP | Peter May | 700 | 59.7 | −3.9 |
| Conservative | Amanda Arnold | 301 | 25.7 | +0.9 |
| Labour | Terry Miller | 172 | 14.7 | +3.1 |
| Majority | | 399 | 34.0 | |
| Turnout | | 1,173 | | |
| CIIP hold | | Swing | ▼2.4 | |

=== Canvey Island East ===
Canvey Island East
| Party | Candidate | Votes | % | ±% |
|---|---|---|---|---|
| CIIP | Alan Acott | 667 | 51.2 | +2.2 |
| Conservative | Owen Cartey | 484 | 37.1 | −4.7 |
| Labour | Jackie Reilly | 152 | 11.7 | +2.4 |
| Majority | | 183 | 14.1 | |
| Turnout | | 1,303 | | |
| CIIP hold | | Swing | ▲3.5 | |

=== Canvey Island North ===
Canvey Island North
| Party | Candidate | Votes | % | ±% |
|---|---|---|---|---|
| CIIP | Nick Harvey | 982 | 66.0 | +10.5 |
| Conservative | Adrian Roper | 330 | 22.2 | −10.0 |
| Labour Co-op | Maggie McArthur-Curtis | 177 | 11.9 | −0.4 |
| Majority | | 652 | 44.0 | |
| Turnout | | 1,489 | | |
| CIIP hold | | Swing | ▲10.3 | |

=== Canvey Island South ===
Canvey Island South
| Party | Candidate | Votes | % | ±% |
|---|---|---|---|---|
| CIIP | Barry Palmer | 885 | 64.7 | +8.8 |
| Conservative | Eleanor Dixon | 361 | 26.4 | −6.1 |
| Labour | Liz Anderson | 121 | 8.9 | +1.4 |
| Majority | | 524 | 38.3 | |
| Turnout | | 1,367 | | |
| CIIP hold | | Swing | ▲7.5 | |

=== Canvey Island West ===
Canvey Island West
| Party | Candidate | Votes | % | ±% |
|---|---|---|---|---|
| Conservative | Jay Blissett | 443 | 38.6 | −5.7 |
| CIIP | Jamie Huntman | 431 | 37.5 | −11.4 |
| Labour | Heidi Cox | 146 | 12.7 | +5.9 |
| Independent | Sean Quartermaine | 129 | 11.2 | N/A |
| Majority | | 12 | 1.6 | |
| Turnout | | 1,149 | | |
| Conservative hold | | Swing | ▲2.9 | |

=== Canvey Island Winter Gardens ===
Canvey Island Winter Gardens
| Party | Candidate | Votes | % | ±% |
|---|---|---|---|---|
| CIIP | Peter Greig | 630 | 56.0 | +18.2 |
| Conservative | John Stone | 313 | 27.8 | +0.1 |
| Labour | Katie Curtis | 182 | 16.2 | +3.9 |
| Majority | | 317 | 28.2 | |
| Turnout | | 1,125 | | |
| CIIP hold | | Swing | ▲9.1 | |

=== Cedar Hall ===
Cedar Hall
| Party | Candidate | Votes | % | ±% |
|---|---|---|---|---|
| PIP | Tom Gibson | 1,056 | 58.6 | N/A |
| Conservative | Pat Haunts | 584 | 32.4 | −7.4 |
| Labour | Moreblessing Chasiya | 161 | 8.9 | −0.6 |
| Majority | | 472 | 26.2 | |
| Turnout | | 1,801 | | |
| PIP gain from Conservative | | Swing | N/A | |

=== St. George's ===
St. George's
| Party | Candidate | Votes | % | ±% |
|---|---|---|---|---|
| Conservative | Sue Mumford | 606 | 42.6 | −0.6 |
| PIP | Nicola Benson | 562 | 39.5 | N/A |
| Labour Co-op | Ros Dunhill | 256 | 18.0 | −2.1 |
| Majority | | 44 | 3.1 | |
| Turnout | | 1,424 | | |
| Conservative hold | | Swing | N/A | |

=== St. James ===
St. James
| Party | Candidate | Votes | % | ±% |
|---|---|---|---|---|
| Conservative | Godfrey Isaacs | 1,030 | 62.5 | +8.0 |
| Labour | Dina Mehdi | 618 | 37.5 | +22.7 |
| Majority | | 412 | 25.0 | |
| Turnout | | 1,648 | | |
| Conservative hold | | Swing | ▼7.4 | |

=== St. Mary's ===
St. Mary's
| Party | Candidate | Votes | % | ±% |
|---|---|---|---|---|
| PIP | Sharon Ainsley | 940 | 47.8 | N/A |
| Conservative | Andrew Sheldon | 737 | 37.4 | −2.3 |
| Labour Co-op | Laurence Chapman | 268 | 13.6 | −4.4 |
| Heritage | Ben Downton | 23 | 1.2 | N/A |
| Majority | | 203 | 10.4 | |
| Turnout | | 1,968 | | |
| PIP gain from Conservative | | Swing | N/A | |

=== St. Peter's ===
St. Peter's
| Party | Candidate | Votes | % | ±% |
|---|---|---|---|---|
| PIP | Hannah Barton-Brown | 750 | 46.5 | N/A |
| Conservative | Nikki Drogman | 664 | 41.2 | −3.7 |
| Labour | Bill Emberson | 198 | 12.3 | +1.0 |
| Majority | | 86 | 5.3 | |
| Turnout | | 1,612 | | |
| PIP gain from Conservative | | Swing | N/A | |

=== Victoria ===
Victoria
| Party | Candidate | Votes | % | ±% |
|---|---|---|---|---|
| PIP | Kieron Bowker | 1,152 | 62.3 | N/A |
| Conservative | Paul Varker | 515 | 27.9 | −9.4 |
| Labour Co-op | Tom Harrison | 181 | 9.8 | −1.5 |
| Majority | | 637 | 34.4 | |
| Turnout | | 1,848 | | |
| PIP gain from Conservative | | Swing | N/A | |
