= Shire Hall, Chelmsford =

County building in Chelmsford, Essex, England

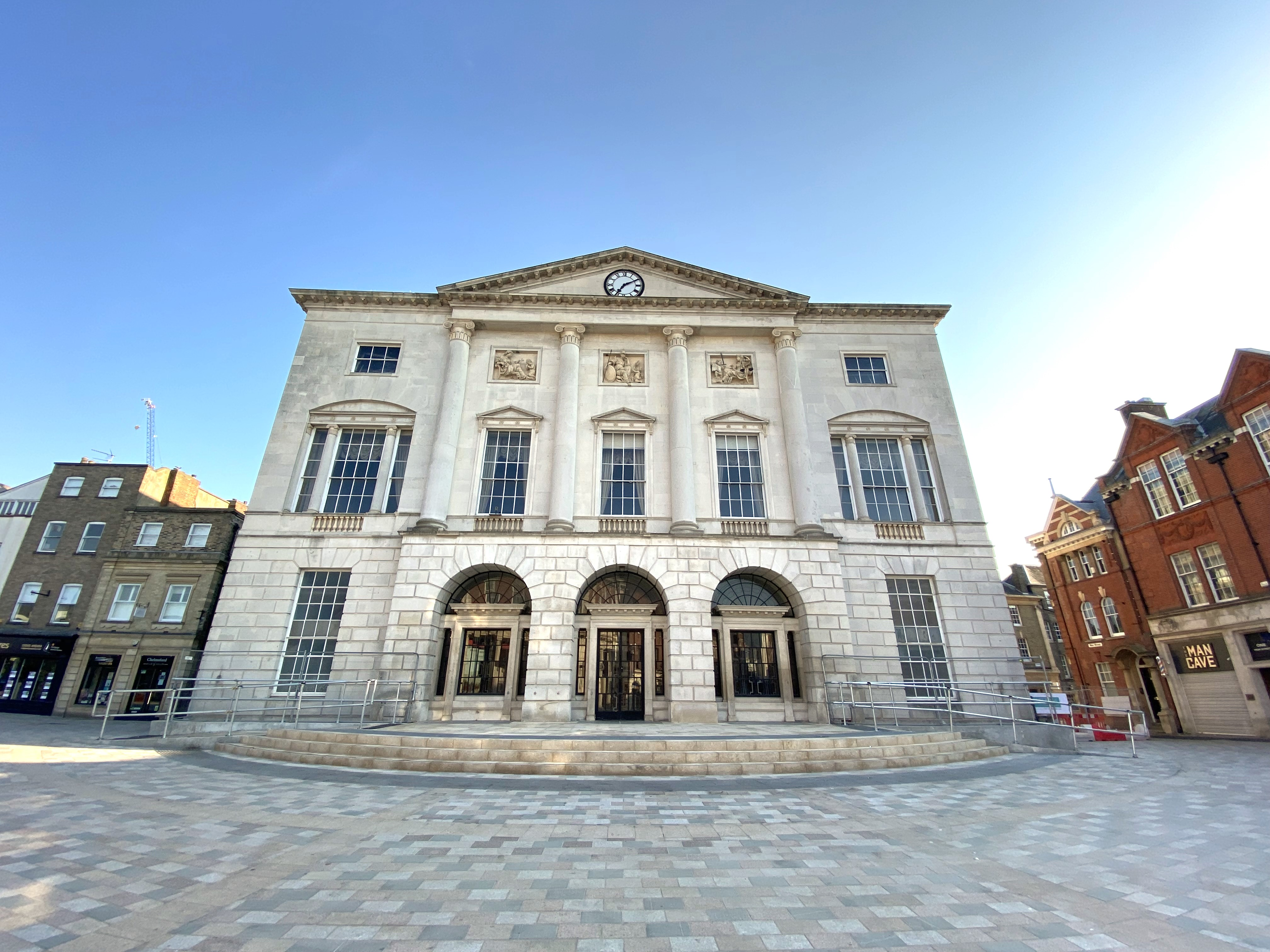

- Location within Essex
- 51.7347°N 0.4729°E
- Location: Chelmsford, Essex

History
- Built: 1791

Site notes
- Architect: John Johnson
- Architectural style: Classical style

Listed Building – Grade II*
- Designated: 20 May 1949
- Reference no.: 1141328

The Shire Hall is a municipal facility in Tindal Square in Chelmsford, Essex. It is a Grade II* listed building.

== History ==
Essex Shire House Act 1789
- Act of Parliament
- Parliament of Great Britain
- Long title: An Act for building a new Shire House, for the County of Essex.
- Citation: 29 Geo. 3. c. 8
- Territorial extent: Great Britain

Dates
- Royal assent: 8 April 1789
- Commencement: 20 November 1788 (Note: Start of session.)

Status: Current legislation

Text of statute as originally enacted

The current building was commissioned to replace an ageing 16th century sessions house at the north end of the High Street which hosted the quarter sessions and which had been supplemented by a smaller building which hosted the nisi prius court. The work was authorised by the Essex Shire House Act 1789 (29 Geo. 3. c. 8).

The new building, which was designed by John Johnson in the classical style with a Portland stone façade, opened in July 1791. The design involved a symmetrical main frontage with five bays facing onto Tindal Square; the central section of three bays, which projected slightly forward, featured three arched entrances on the ground floor which were originally open; there were three windows on the first floor interspersed with Ionic order columns supporting a large pediment containing a clock. Above the first floor windows were carvings depicting justice, wisdom and mercy. Internally, the principal rooms were a corn exchange and two court rooms on the ground floor and there was a large assembly room on the first floor.

In 1856, after a crowd entered the building to attend a trial of five men charged with murder while poaching, the staircase collapsed killing one youth and seriously injuring four others.

Elected county councils were established in 1889 under the Local Government Act 1888. Essex County Council held its first formal meeting at Shire Hall on 2 April 1889, when the question of where the council should meet was debated. It was eventually decided that the four quarterly meetings of the council would be held at Shire Hall, but other meetings and committees would be held in London, which was more accessible by train for the majority of the councillors. Shire Hall continued to be used for quarterly meetings of the council until a new council chamber at County Hall was completed in 1938.

Shire Hall's function as a judicial facility reduced with the opening of the new Crown Court in New Street in 1982 and ceased completely with the opening of a new magistrates' court in New Street in April 2012.

In 2019, after the building had lain empty for seven years, the county council appointed the developer, Aquila, to submit proposals for a mixed-used development in the building. Aquila's planning permission application, submitted in 2021, was rejected in 2022.

In 2024 a long-term lease was granted to the Essex Shire Hall Trust, who submitted a planning application for the building in May 2026.

== Artworks ==
Works of art in Shire Hall include three statues of classical female figures by the sculptor, John Bacon, as well as chimney pieces at either end of the assembly hall containing panels carved by Charles Rossi.
