= Canvey Point =

Coordinates: 51.522°N 0.633°E

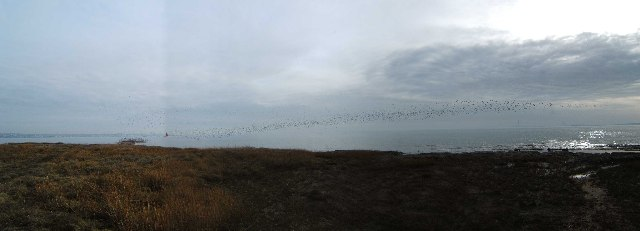
Canvey Point, looking east

Canvey Point is situated in the easternmost part of Canvey Island in the borough of Castle Point, Essex, England.

Canvey Point is commonly referred to as just "The Point" by most residents of Canvey Island.

It is reputedly haunted by the ghost of a Viking invader, searching for his ship.
