= County Hall, Chelmsford =

County building in Chelmsford, Essex, England

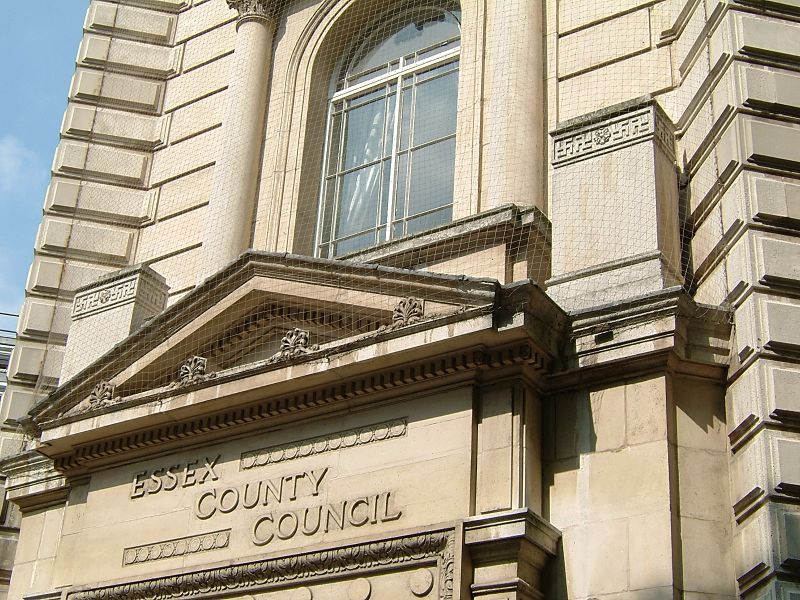
- The entrance to Block C of County Hall

- Location within Essex
- 51.7347°N 0.4704°E
- Location: Chelmsford, Essex

History
- Built: 1909

Site notes
- Architect: Frank Whitmore
- Architectural style: Classical style

Listed Building – Grade II
- Designated: 26 February 2007
- Reference no.: 1391892

Essex County Hall is a municipal building in Market Road, Chelmsford, Essex: it is the headquarters of Essex County Council. Blocks C and D are Grade II listed buildings.

== History ==
Following the implementation of the Local Government Act 1888, which established county councils in every county, it became necessary to find facilities for Essex County Council. Given the difficulty of travelling by rail to Chelmsford from many parts of the county, the council decided to hold only its quarterly meetings at the Shire Hall there, with other committees and meetings being held in London, which was more accessible to the majority of councillors. The council subsequently established two small offices on the north side of King Edward's Street.

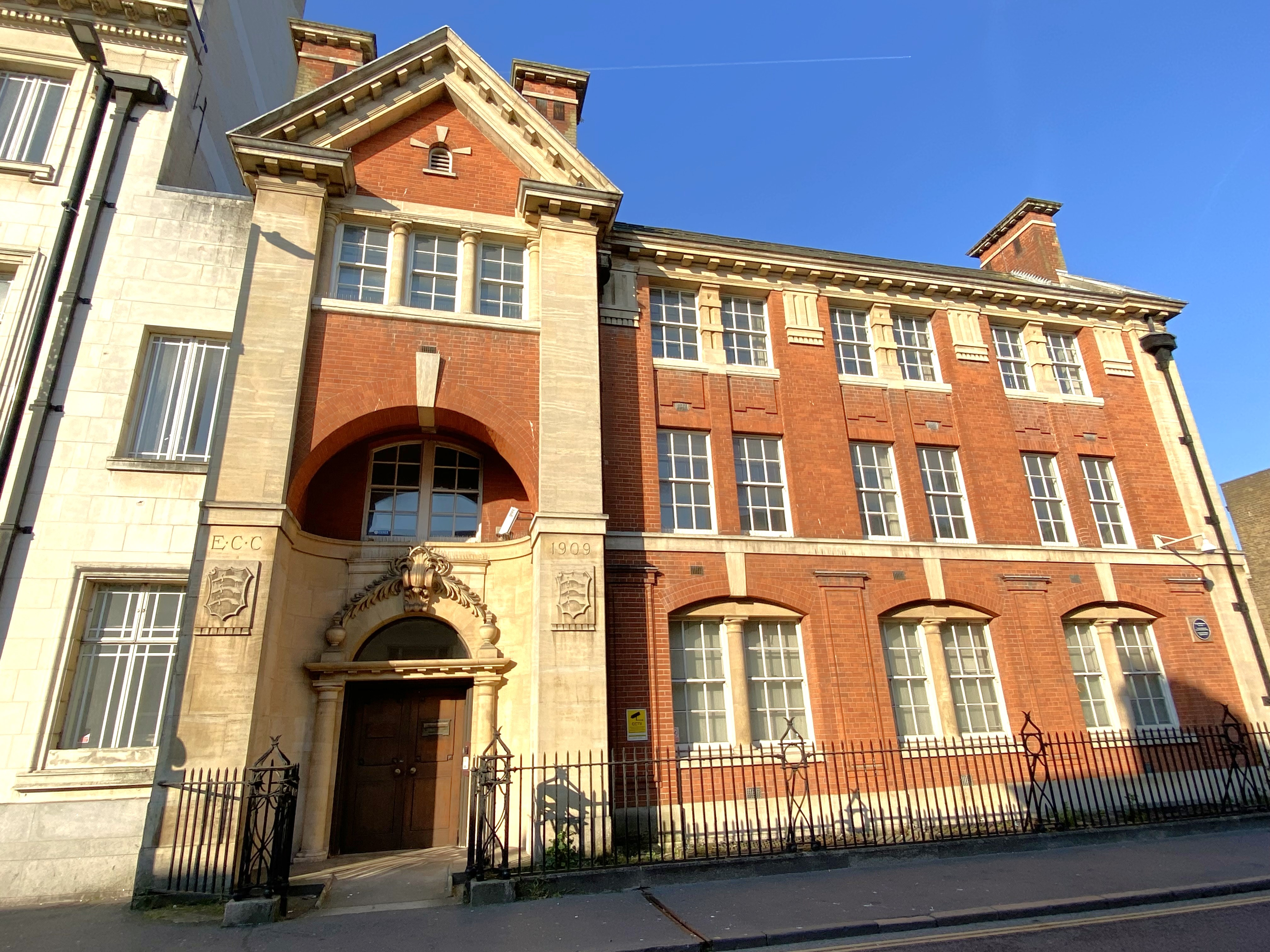
The oldest part of the complex, known as Block D

In due course more substantial facilities became necessary and a red brick building on Duke Street (later known as Block D), designed by Frank Whitmore in the classical style, was completed in 1909. The design involved an asymmetrical main frontage with four bays facing Duke Street; the left bay featured an arched recess containing a doorway with a fanlight above flanked by Doric order columns and full height stone pilasters bearing the county coat of arms; there was a double window on the first floor and a triple window on the second floor with an open pediment above. The Duke Street block was designed with a view to it being later extended to incorporate a council chamber, but in 1913 the council decided not to pursue the extension on grounds of cost, preferring to continue to meet at both Shire Hall and in London.

By the late 1920s it was clear that further expansion was needed. The properties in King Edward's Street were demolished and the most imposing part of the new county hall complex, a building clad in Portland Stone on the corner of Duke Street and Threadneedle Street known as Block C, designed by J. Stuart, was built between 1929 and 1939. The design featured a main entrance at the south east corner of the building facing Market Road; there was a doorway on the ground floor flanked by Doric order columns supporting an entablature with a pediment above; there was a round headed window on the first floor flanked by Corinthian order columns and there were smaller windows on the floors above. A line of swastikas carved into the stonework above the doorway led to controversy in 2014. Internally, the principal rooms were the council chamber, the committee room and the council chairman's room which were all fitted out at the expense of the businessman and philanthropist, Sir William Courtauld. The council chamber in the new building was formally opened on 23 September 1938.

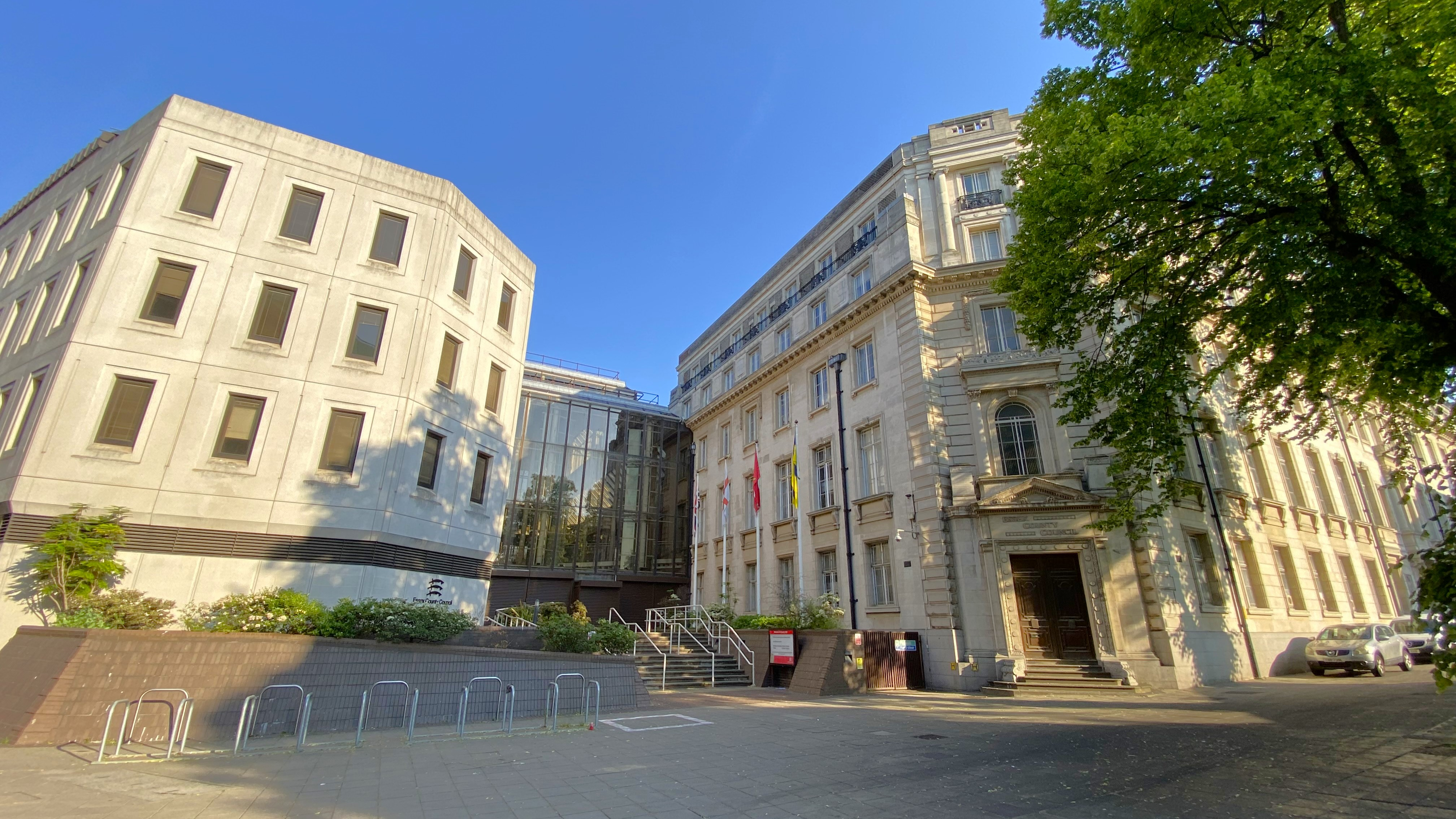
The main entrance facing Market Road, with Block A to the left and Block C to the right

A modern 3-storey building in the heart of the complex, known as Block B, followed after the Second World War and a modern 9-storey building on Victoria Road South, known as Block A, which was designed by H. Connolly, was built between 1959 and 1965.

Works of art in the building include a bust of the politician, Thomas Gardiner Bramston, by the sculptor, John Ternouth and a bust of the politician, John Perry-Watlington, by the sculptor, William Theed.
