= The People's Independent Party =

English political party

- Abbreviation: PIP
- Leader: Warren Gibson
- Founder: Steven Cole
- Founded: 2021; 5 years ago
- Registered: 18 March 2022; 4 years ago
- Headquarters: 441 High Road, Essex, SS7 5AF
- Ideology: Localism
- Colours: Yellow-green; Green
- Essex County Council: 1 / 77
- Castle Point Borough Council: 24 / 39

Website
- www.thepip.org.uk

The People's Independent Party (PIP) is a localist political party based in Castle Point, in Essex, England. Formed in 2021 by former Conservative councillor Steven Cole, and registered in 2022, PIP sought to prevent a local plan to build 5,000 homes in the borough, by taking control of the council from the ruling Conservatives. At formation, the party had four councillors (including Cole), all (except Cole) were originally elected as independents.

== History ==
PIP was founded to oppose house-building in the Local Plan. Following the results of the 2022 election, the PIP gained six seats to take its total to 10 councillors, ending over 20 years of Conservative control of Castle Point Borough Council. A new joint administration was formed between the PIP and the Canvey Island Independent Party, with Steven Cole becoming Deputy Leader of the council.

In February 2023, Steven Cole stood down as party leader, and former HGV and taxi driver Warren Gibson was elected as leader of PIP and deputy leader of the council. In the 2023 election, the People's Independent Party gained a further seven seats bringing their total up to 16, all of which were taken from the Conservatives. There was one remaining seat in the St James' Ward that was Conservative-held.

In the 2024 election, the party increased their vote share and gained a further eight councillors, winning a majority of 24 seats on the council, with the Conservatives losing all their seats. They again formed the administration alongside Canvey Island Independent Party. This led to Castle Point becoming the only council in England other than the all-independent Isles of Scilly Council where none of the seats are held by Labour, Conservatives, Liberal Democrats, or Greens. PIP was helped by thirteen Conservative candidates being unable to stand due to issues with their nomination papers, as well as dissatisfaction with national parties. With CIIP, PIP supported court action to recover what they saw as excess payments to former council leadership.

In England's 2026 local elections, the PIP stood three candidates for Essex County Council with one being elected.

== Policies ==
The main focus of the PIP has been re-writing the council's local plan to reduce construction and prioritise the development of brownfield sites. Other policies include freezing council tax, introducing a Community Infrastructure Levy, changing the election cycle to every four years, and spending £1.5 million to rejuvenate council owned buildings. The Conservative government in 2024 labelled Castle Point under PIP as a "consistent under-performance" area for house building.

Previously, the party campaigned on expanding activities for young people, and pushing for consultation on street lights being turned back on between 1 a.m. and 5 a.m.. In July 2025, the party proposed increasing the area covered by a Public Spaces Protection Order to reduce vehicle-related anti-social behaviour, and the following month agreed to keep streetlights on overnight following a consultation. The party opposed the local government reorganisation planned for 2027, which will abolish Castle Point council.
