= Holehaven Creek =

Protected area in Essex, England

Coordinates: 51.518°N 0.522°E

- Site of Special Scientific Interest
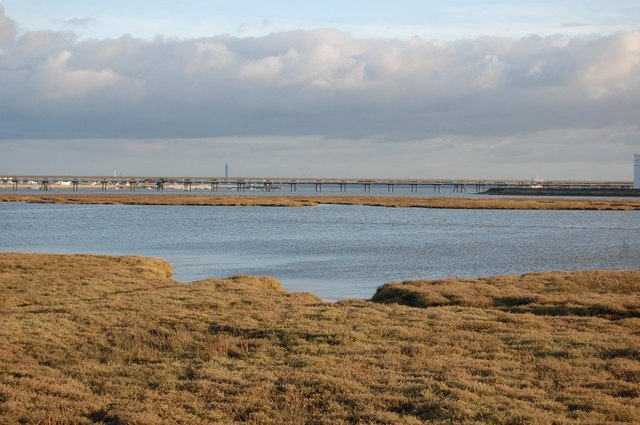
- Location of Holehaven Creek.
- Area of search: Essex
- Grid reference: TQ 750832
- Interest: Biological
- Area: 272.9 ha (674 acres)
- Notification date: 2003
- Location map: Magic Map

Holehaven Creek is a tidal creek between Canvey Island and Corringham in Essex and drains the a number of surrounding marshes in the area. It has been designated as a 272.9-hectare (674-acre) biological Site of Special Scientific Interest (SSSI). The channel up the creek is accessible to small boats, and the Thames Estuary Path runs along its eastern boundary. The creek is named after the Holehaven anchorage (haven for shipping) formed by its mouth on the River Thames, although this is no longer used as it once was.

== History ==
It was used a quarantine place for international shipping headed to London before and during the Great Plague of London.

Wooden reservoirs in the creek were used to hold lobsters destined for London brought in on well-boats from Scotland and Norway.

== SSSI ==
The SSSI consists of Holehaven Creek itself and part of the adjoining East Haven Creek and Vange Creek. It is part of the Thames Estuary, and drains the surrounding marshes into the river. It has been designated an SSSI because its intertidal marshes and mudflats support nationally important (and sometimes internationally) numbers of wintering black-tailed godwits. Curlews and dunlins are also sometimes present in nationally significant numbers.
