= 1995 Castle Point Borough Council election =

1995 UK local government election

The 1995 Castle Point Borough Council election took place on 4 May 1995 to elect members of Castle Point Borough Council in Essex, England.

== Results summary ==
1995 Castle Point Borough Council election
Party	Seats	Gains	Losses	Net gain/loss	Seats %	Votes %	Votes	+/−
Labour	34	31	0	▲31	87.2	57.6	41,665	+28.1
Conservative	5	0	31	▼31	12.8	30.0	21,673	-25.9
Liberal Democrats	0	0	0	Steady	0.0	12.0	8,681	+0.4
Independent	0	0	0	Steady	0.0	0.3	238	-0.2
Militant Labour	0	0	0	Steady	0.0	0.1	17	New
