= Essex County Council =

English principal local authority in the East of England

- Arms of Essex

- Council logo

Type
- Type: Non-metropolitan county

Leadership
- Chair: Karen McIvor, Reform UK since 28 May 2026
- Leader: Peter Harris, Reform UK since 28 May 2026
- Chief Executive: Nicole Wood since 14 February 2025

Structure
- Seats: 78 councillors
- Political groups: Administration (50) Reform (50) Other parties (28) Conservative (15) Liberal Democrats (6) Labour (1) R4U (1) People's Independent (1) Independent (4)
- Length of term: 4 years

Elections
- Voting system: First-past-the-post
- Last election: 7 May 2026

Meeting place
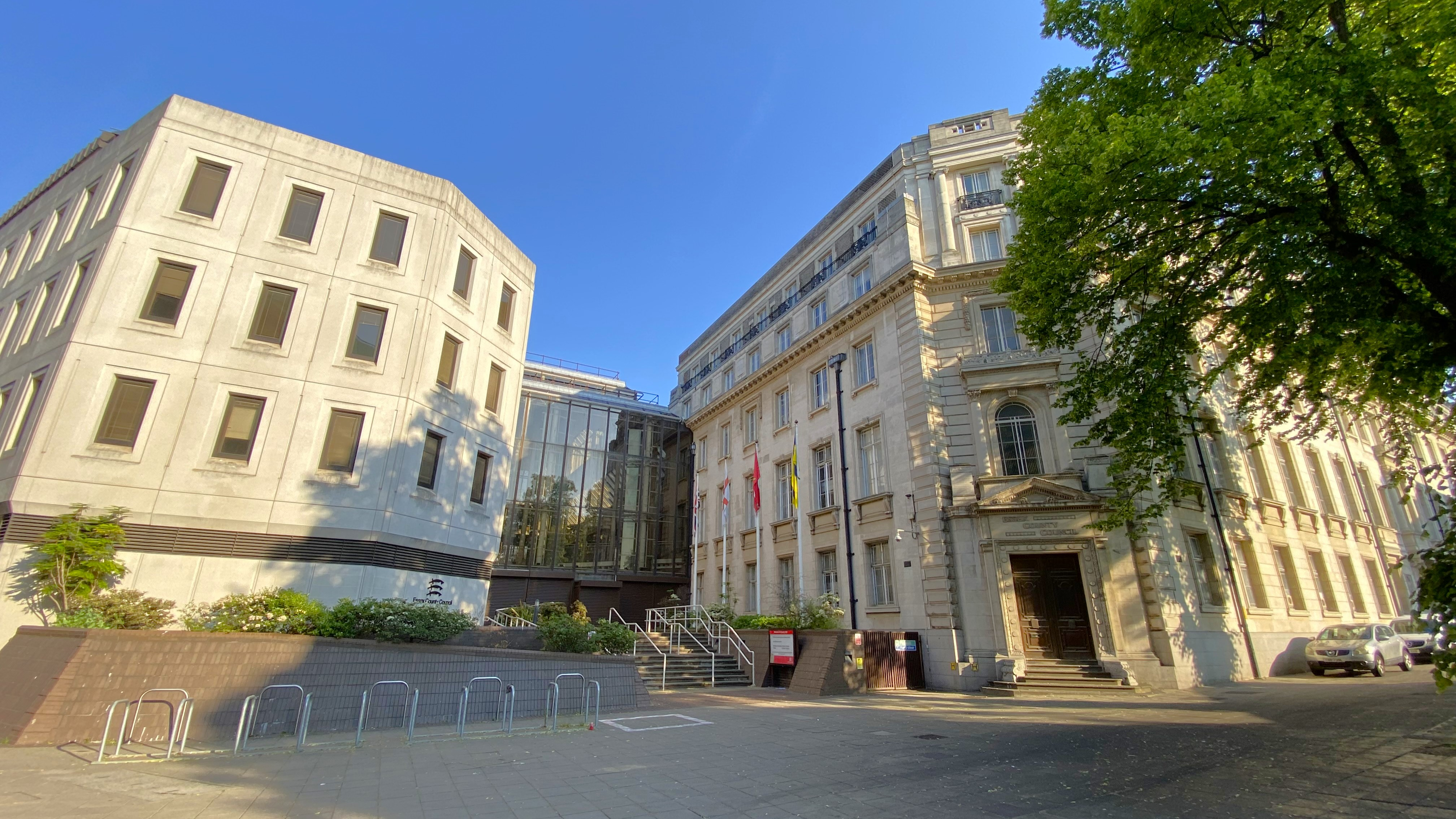
- County Hall, Market Road, Chelmsford, CM1 1QH

Website
- www.essex.gov.uk

Essex County Council is the county council that governs the non-metropolitan county of Essex in England. The non-metropolitan county is smaller than the ceremonial county; the non-metropolitan county excludes Southend-on-Sea and Thurrock which are both administered as separate unitary authorities. The county council has been under Reform UK majority control since 2026. The council meets at County Hall in the centre of Chelmsford.

== History ==
Elected county councils were created under the Local Government Act 1888, taking over many administrative functions that had previously been performed by magistrates at the Quarter Sessions. The first elections were held in January 1889, and the council formally came into being on 1 April 1889. The council held its first official meeting on 2 April 1889 at the Shire Hall in Chelmsford. The first chairman of the council was Andrew Johnston of Woodford, a Liberal, who held the post for 27 years until he stood down in 1916.

The area governed by the county council (called the "administrative county" until 1974) excluded county boroughs, which were towns considered large enough to provide their own county-level services. When the county council was established in 1889 there was one county borough within the wider county of Essex, at West Ham. Other county boroughs were subsequently created, removing them from the administrative county, being Southend-on-Sea in 1914 and East Ham in 1915. The administrative county was further reduced in 1965 under the London Government Act 1963 which transferred Barking, Chingford, Dagenham, Hornchurch, Ilford, Leyton, Romford, Walthamstow, and Wanstead and Woodford to Greater London.

The county was reconstituted in 1974 as a non-metropolitan county under the Local Government Act 1972, which reformed the council's powers and responsibilities and saw it regain jurisdiction over Southend-on-Sea. The county was divided into 14 non-metropolitan districts at the same time, forming a lower tier of local government. In 1998 two of the districts, Southend-on-Sea and Thurrock were made unitary authorities, removing them from the area controlled by Essex County Council and transferring county-level services to those councils. For certain services, Essex, Southend and Thurrock co-operate through joint arrangements, such as the Essex County Fire and Rescue Service.

At the 2011 census Essex County Council served a population of 1,393,600, making it one of the largest local authorities in England. County council functions include social care, transport, education and many others.

=== Future arrangements ===
Under the English devolution white paper of December 2024, it was proposed that the Essex, including the unitary authority areas of Thurrock and Southend-on-Sea, would be re-organised into two or three local authorities. Essex was accepted on to the priority programme in February 2025.

In March 2026, the government announced local government reorganisation plans, which would have seen the county council abolished in 2028 and local government across Essex reorganised into five unitary authorities. These proposals were withdrawn in September 2026.

== Political control ==
The council has had a Reform UK majority since 2026, which saw the Conservative lose majority control of Essex County Council for the first time since 2001

Political control of the county council since the 1974 reforms has been as follows:

| Party in control | Years |
|---|---|
| Conservative | 1974–1985 |
| No overall control | 1985–1989 |
| Conservative | 1989–1993 |
| No overall control | 1993–1998 |
| Conservative | 1998–1998 |
| No overall control | 1998–2001 |
| Conservative | 2001–2026 |
| Reform | 2026-present |

=== Leadership ===
The leaders of the council since 1993 have been:

| Councillor | Party | From | To |
|---|---|---|---|
| Bill Archibald | Labour | May 1993 | May 1996 |
| Chris Pearson | Labour | May 1996 | May 1997 |
| Mervyn Juliff | Labour | May 1997 | Apr 1998 |
| Paul White, Baron Hanningfield | Conservative | Apr 1998 | May 1999 |
| Mervyn Juliff | Labour | May 1999 | Feb 2000 |
| Paul White, Baron Hanningfield | Conservative | Feb 2000 | 9 Feb 2010 |
| Peter Martin | Conservative | 9 Feb 2010 | May 2013 |
| David Finch | Conservative | 14 May 2013 | May 2021 |
| Kevin Bentley | Conservative | 25 May 2021 | May 2026 |
| Peter Harris | Reform | 28 May 2026 | |

=== Composition ===
Following the 2026 election, and subsequent changes the make-up of the council is as follows:

| Party | Councillors |
|---|---|
| Reform | 50 |
| Conservative | 15 |
| Liberal Democrats | 6 |
| Labour | 1 |
| R4U | 1 |
| People's Independent | 1 |
| Independent | 4 |
| Total | 78 |

== Elections ==
Since the last boundary changes in 2026 the council has comprised 78 councillors representing 78 electoral divisions, each electing one councillor. Elections are held every four years.

== Premises ==
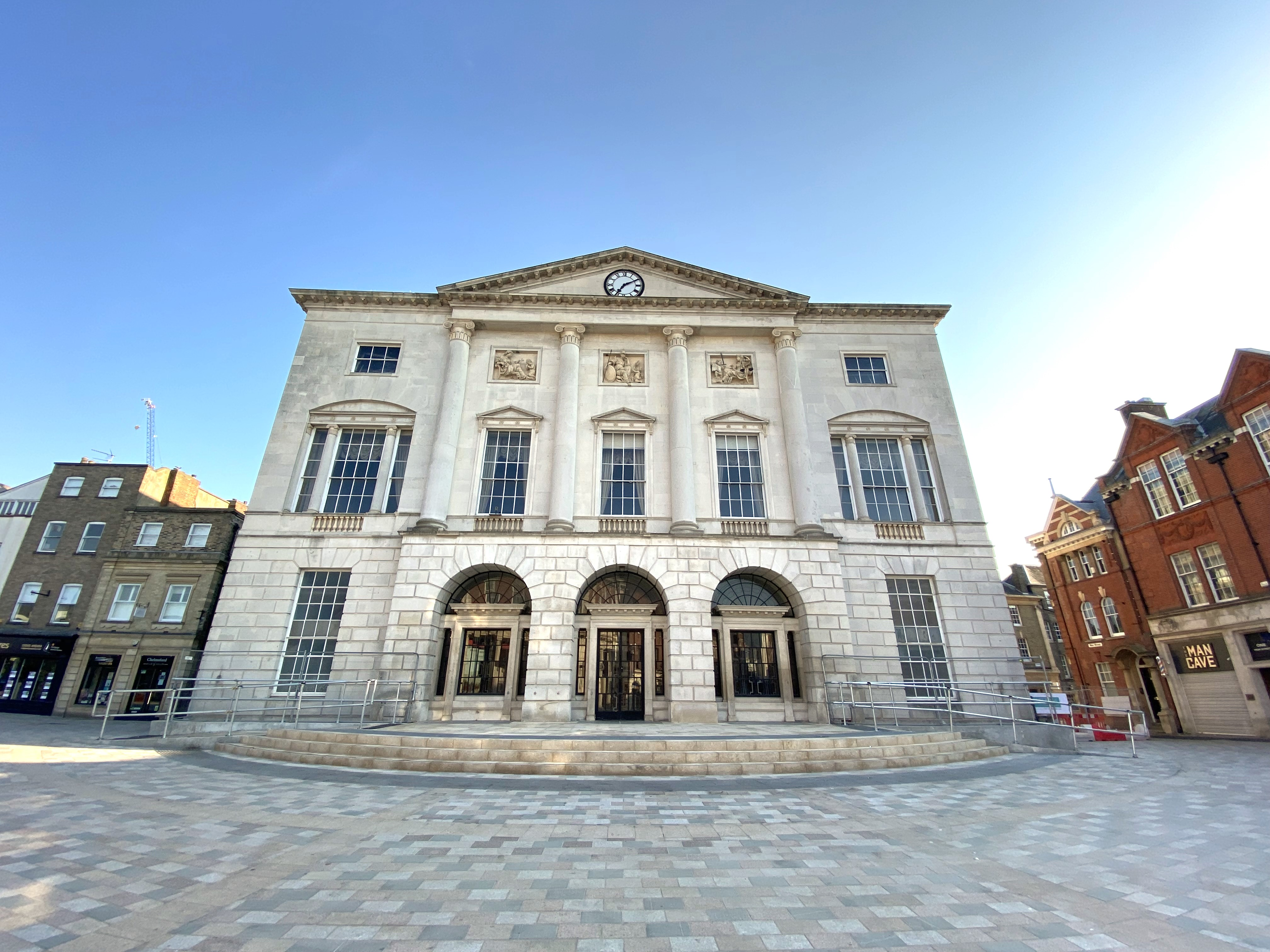
Shire Hall, Chelmsford: Used for council meetings 1889–1938.

The council is based at County Hall on Market Road in Chelmsford.

From its creation in 1889 until 1938 the council met four times a year at Shire Hall in Chelmsford but met at other times at premises near Liverpool Street station in London, which was more accessible by train to the majority of councillors. In 1909 the council built itself an office building on Duke Street in Chelmsford with a view to later extending the building to include a council chamber, before deciding against the extension on grounds of cost. The council's London premises moved several times, finally settling in 1931 at a building called Essex House at 26 Finsbury Square, which included offices, a council chamber and committee rooms.

A new County Hall was built between 1929 and 1939 between Market Road, Threadneedle Street and Duke Street in Chelmsford, adjoining the 1909 office block. The new County Hall included a council chamber, which was formally opened on 23 September 1938. The council's London premises at Finsbury Square were destroyed in the Blitz during the Second World War. Further extensions were added to County Hall in the 1950s and 1960s, particularly along Market Road.

== Young Essex Assembly ==
Essex County Council operates the Young Essex Assembly, an elected youth council comprising 75 members aged between 11 and 19, or 11 and 25 if they have additional needs, who aim to represent young people across Essex. The initiative seeks to engage younger people in the county, with the youth councillors working with schools and youth centres to improve youth services in Essex and help voice concerns of younger people. The Youth Assembly also sends representatives to the UK Youth Parliament.

== Notable members ==
- Sir Sydney Walter Robinson (1876–1950), briefly Liberal member of parliament for Chelmsford
- Major-General Lord Edward Hay (1888–1944)
- Beryl Platt, Baroness Platt of Writtle, Chairman 1971–1980
- Robert Dixon-Smith, Baron Dixon-Smith, Chairman 1986–1989
- Paul White, Baron Hanningfield, Chairman 1989–1992, Leader 2001–2010
- Angela Smith, Baroness Smith of Basildon, member 1989–1993, later member of parliament for Basildon and a peer since 2010

== See also ==
- Essex Act 1987
- The Association of South Essex Local Authorities
