= 2023 Castle Point Borough Council election =

2023 UK local government election

- 4 May 2023

14 out of 41 seats to Castle Point Borough Council 21 seats needed for a majority

	First party	Second party	Third party
Leader	Warren Gibson	Dave Blackwell	Godfrey Isaacs
Party	PIP	CIIP	Conservative
Last election	10 seats, 28.6%	16 seats, 19.9%	15 seats, 36.6%
Seats before	10	16	15
Seats won	7	6	1
Seats after	16	16	9
Seat change	▲6	Steady	▼6
Popular vote	6,840	3,900	5,512
Percentage	35.4%	20.2%	28.5%
Swing	▲6.8%	▲0.3%	▼8.1%
Leader before election
Dave Blackwell
Canvey Island Independent Party
No overall control
Leader after election
Dave Blackwell
Canvey Island Independent Party
No overall control

The 2023 Castle Point Borough Council election took place on 4 May 2023 to elect members of Castle Point Borough Council in Essex, England. This was on the same day as other local elections across England.

The coalition between The People's Independent Party and the Canvey Island Independent Party substantially increased their majority on the council at the expense of the Conservatives.

In the aftermath of the election the Conservative group leader, Godfrey Isaacs, left the group to sit as an independent councillor. He was replaced as group leader by Beverley Egan. Dave Blackwell, leader of the Canvey Island Independent Party, continued to serve as leader of the council after the election.

== Summary ==
=== Election result ===
2023 Castle Point Borough Council election
Party	This election				Full council			This election		
Party	Candidates	Seats	Net	Seats %	Other	Total	Total %	Votes	Votes %	+/−
PIP	{{{candidates}}}	7	▲6	50.0	10	16	39.02	6,840	35.4	+6.8
CIIP	{{{candidates}}}	6	Steady	39.02	10	16	39.0	3,900	20.2	+0.3
Conservative	{{{candidates}}}	1	▼6	7.1	7	9	19.5	5,512	28.5	–8.1
Labour	{{{candidates}}}	0	Steady	0.0	0	0	0.0	2,581	13.4	–0.8
Liberal Democrats	{{{candidates}}}	0	Steady	0.0	0	0	0.0	201	1.0	N/A
Independent	{{{candidates}}}	0	Steady	0.0	0	0	0.0	162	0.8	+0.2
Reform	{{{candidates}}}	0	Steady	0.0	0	0	0.0	111	0.6	N/A

== Ward results ==
The Statement of Persons Nominated, which details the candidates standing in each ward, was released by Castle Point Borough Council following the close of nominations on 5 April 2023. The results of the election were announced on 5 May 2023.

=== Appleton ===
Appleton
Party	Candidate	Votes	%	±%
PIP	Benjamin Bizzell	653	43.3	–1.8
Conservative	Wayne Johnson	614	40.7	–0.7
Labour Co-op	Mark Maguire	241	16.0	+2.5
Majority		39	2.6	–1.1
Turnout		1,508		
PIP gain from Conservative		Swing	▼0.6	

=== Boyce ===
Boyce
Party	Candidate	Votes	%	±%
PIP	Rob Lillis	1,036	59.2	+11.2
Conservative	Chas Mumford*	566	32.3	–9.3
Labour	Gwyn Bailey	149	8.5	–1.9
Majority		470	26.9	+20.5
Turnout		1,751		
PIP gain from Conservative		Swing	▲10.3	

=== Canvey Island Central ===
Canvey Island Central
Party	Candidate	Votes	%	±%
CIIP	Dave Blackwell*	665	65.5	+5.8
Conservative	Nikki Drogman	176	17.3	–8.4
Labour	Terry Miller	175	17.2	+2.5
Majority		489	48.2	+14.2
Turnout		1,016		
CIIP hold		Swing	▲7.1	

=== Canvey Island East ===
Canvey Island East
Party	Candidate	Votes	%	±%
CIIP	Grace Watson	678	64.4	+13.2
Conservative	Pat Haunts	247	23.5	–13.6
Labour	Jackie Reilly	127	12.1	+0.4
Majority		431	40.9	+26.8
Turnout		1,052		
CIIP hold		Swing	▲13.4	

=== Canvey Island North ===
Canvey Island North
Party	Candidate	Votes	%	±%
CIIP	Michael Fuller*	872	69.0	+3.0
Conservative	Adrian Roper	231	18.3	–3.9
Labour Co-op	Maggie McArthur-Curtis	161	12.7	+0.8
Majority		641	50.7	+7.9
Turnout		1,264		
CIIP hold		Swing	▲3.5	

=== Canvey Island South ===
Canvey Island South
Party	Candidate	Votes	%	±%
CIIP	Janice Payne*	762	64.2	–0.5
Conservative	Wayne Lambert	260	21.9	–4.5
Labour	Daniel Curtis	119	10.0	+1.1
Liberal Democrats	Richard Bannister	45	3.8	N/A
Majority		502	42.3	+4.0
Turnout		1,186		
CIIP hold		Swing	▲2.0	

=== Canvey Island West ===
Canvey Island West
Party	Candidate	Votes	%	±%
CIIP	David Thomas*	394	40.9	+3.4
Conservative	John Stone	298	30.9	–7.7
Independent	Sean Quartermaine	162	16.8	+5.6
Labour	Heidi Cox	110	11.4	–1.3
Majority		96	10.0	N/A
Turnout		964		
CIIP hold		Swing	▲5.1	

=== Canvey Island Winter Gardens ===
Canvey Island Winter Gardens
Party	Candidate	Votes	%	±%
CIIP	Graham Withers*	529	58.0	+2.0
Conservative	Jeffrey Stanley	195	21.4	–6.4
Labour Co-op	Liz Anderson	188	20.6	+4.4
Majority		334	36.6	+8.4
Turnout		912		
CIIP hold		Swing	▲4.2	

=== Cedar Hall ===
Cedar Hall
Party	Candidate	Votes	%	±%
PIP	Gareth Howlett	900	53.0	–5.6
Conservative	Colin Maclean*	624	36.7	+4.3
Labour Co-op	Moreblessing Chasiya	142	8.4	–0.5
Reform	Keiron McGill	32	1.9	N/A
Majority		276	16.3	–9.9
Turnout		1,698		
PIP gain from Conservative		Swing	▼5.0	

=== St. George's ===
St. George's
Party	Candidate	Votes	%	±%
PIP	Nicola Benson	604	48.1	+8.6
Conservative	Jack Fortt	409	32.5	–10.1
Labour	Katie Curtis	244	19.4	+1.4
Majority		195	15.6	N/A
Turnout		1,257		
PIP hold		Swing	▲9.4	

=== St. James ===
St. James
Party	Candidate	Votes	%	±%
Conservative	Jacqui Thornton*	698	41.2	–21.3
PIP	Sonny Allain	451	26.6	N/A
Labour	Dina Mehdi	311	18.3	–19.2
Liberal Democrats	Geoffrey Duff	156	9.2	N/A
Reform	Simon Woodward	79	4.7	N/A
Majority		247	14.6	–10.4
Turnout		1,695		
Conservative hold		Swing	N/A	

=== St. Mary's ===
St. Mary's
Party	Candidate	Votes	%	±%
PIP	Di Jones	948	58.2	+10.4
Conservative	James Cutler*	420	25.8	–11.6
Labour Co-op	Laurence Chapman	262	16.1	+2.5
Majority		528	32.4	–22.0
Turnout		1,630		
PIP gain from Conservative		Swing	▲11.0	

=== St. Peter's ===
St. Peter's
Party	Candidate	Votes	%	±%
PIP	Michael Dearson	892	56.2	+9.7
Conservative	Michael Dixon	497	31.3	–9.9
Labour	Bill Emberson	199	12.5	+0.2
Majority		395	24.9	+19.6
Turnout		1,588		
PIP gain from Conservative		Swing	▲9.8	

=== Victoria ===
Victoria
Party	Candidate	Votes	%	±%
PIP	John Knott	1,356	75.9	+13.6
Conservative	Eleanor Dixon	277	15.5	–12.4
Labour Co-op	Joe Cooke	153	8.6	–1.2
Majority		1,079	60.4	+26.0
Turnout		1,786		
PIP gain from Conservative		Swing	▲13.0	
