= Borough of Castle Point =

Castle Point
- Non-metropolitan district and borough
- Borough of Castle Point
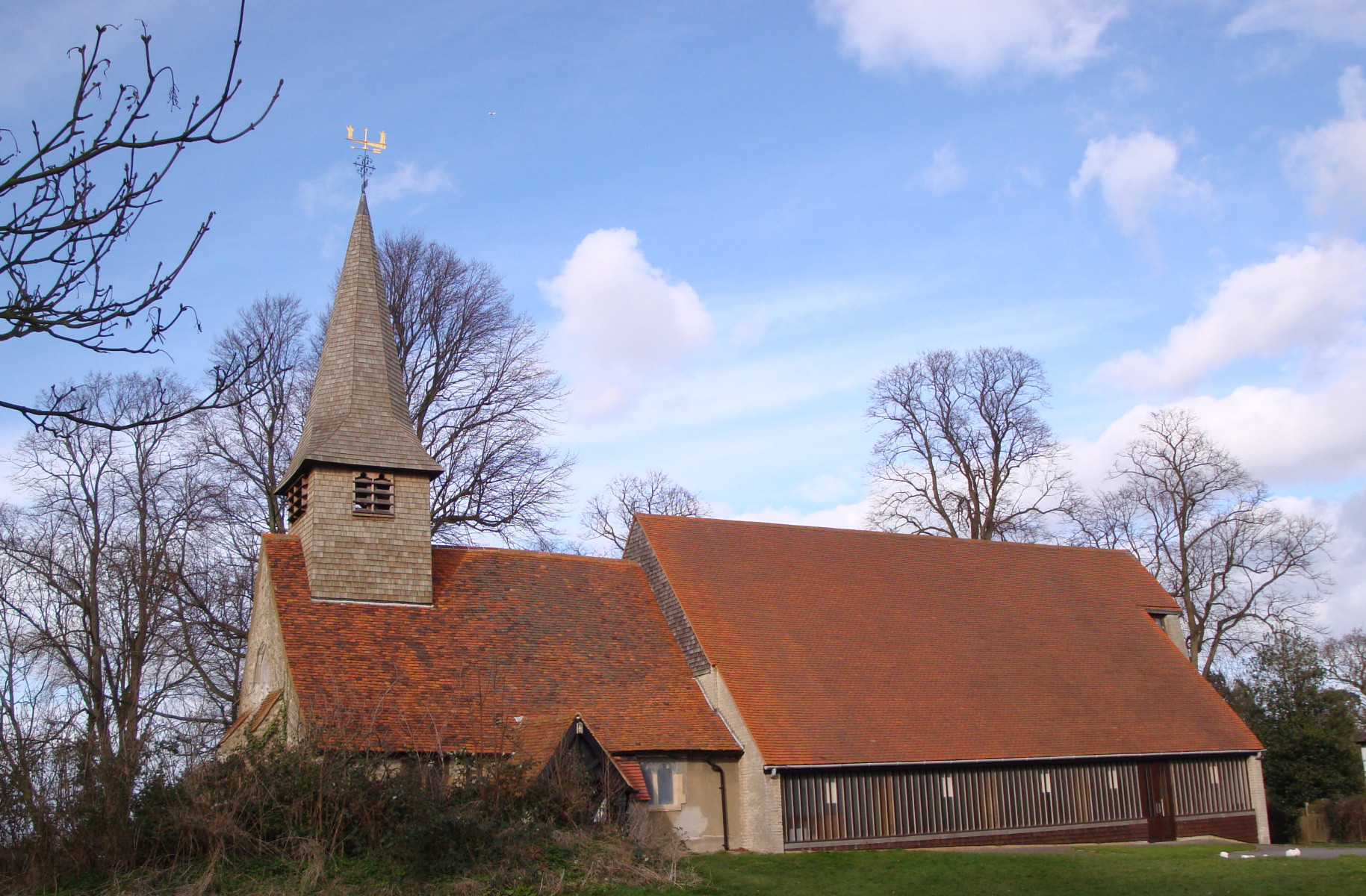
- Thundersley, one of the towns of the borough and its administrative centre

- Castle Point within Essex
- Coordinates: 51.54°N 0.58°E
- Country: United Kingdom
- Constituent country: England
- Region: East of England
- County: Essex
- Established: 1 April 1974
- Admin HQ: Thundersley

Government
  - Type: Alternative s.31
  - MPs: Rebecca Harris (Conservative)

Area
  - Land: 17.41 sq mi (45.08 km^{2})

Population (2021)2021 Census
  - Total: 89,591
  - Estimate (2021): 89,591
  - Density: 4,976/sq mi (1,921.2/km^{2})

Ethnicity (2021)
  - Ethnic groups: List: 94.9% White; 1.7% Asian; 1.6% Mixed; 1.3% Black; 0.5% other

Religion (2021)
  - Religion: List: 48.6% Christianity; 43.5% no religion; 7.1% other; 0.8% Islam
- Time zone: UTC+0 (Greenwich Mean Time)
  - Summer (DST): UTC+1 (British Summer Time)

Castle Point is a local government district with borough status in south Essex, England, lying around 30 miles (48 km) east of London. The borough comprises the towns of South Benfleet, Hadleigh and Thundersley (where the council is based) on the mainland, and the adjoining Canvey Island in the Thames Estuary, which is connected to the mainland by bridges.

The borough borders the City of Southend-on-Sea to the east, Rochford District to the north. The government had announced plans to merged the district into a new unitary authority area with these districts in 2028. In September 2026, the government suspended the plans, and elections for the current council would take place in May 2027. Castle Point also borders Borough of Basildon to the west, and the Thurrock unitary authority area to the south-west, across Holehaven Creek.

== History ==
Castle Point was formed on 1 April 1974, under the Local Government Act 1972, as one of 14 non-metropolitan districts within Essex. The new district covered the areas of the former urban districts of Benfleet and Canvey Island, both of which were abolished at the same time.

The district was named "Castle Point", combining references to landmarks in both of the former urban districts: Hadleigh Castle in Benfleet and Canvey Point at the eastern tip of Canvey Island.

The district was granted borough status with effect from 1 February 1992, allowing the chair of the council to take the title of mayor.

In March 2026, the government announced that it would abolish the district in 2028 as part of local government reform across Essex. These proposals were withdrawn in September 2026.

== Governance ==
Castle Point Borough Council

Type
- Type: Non-metropolitan district

Leadership
- Mayor: Kate Knott, PIP since 20 May 2026
- Leader: Dave Blackwell, CIIP since 18 May 2022
- Chief Executive: Angela Hutchings since 1 July 2022

Structure
- Seats: 39
- Political groups: All parties (39) PIP (24) CIIP (14) Reform (1)

Elections
- Last election: 2 May 2024
- Next election: 4 May 2028

Meeting place
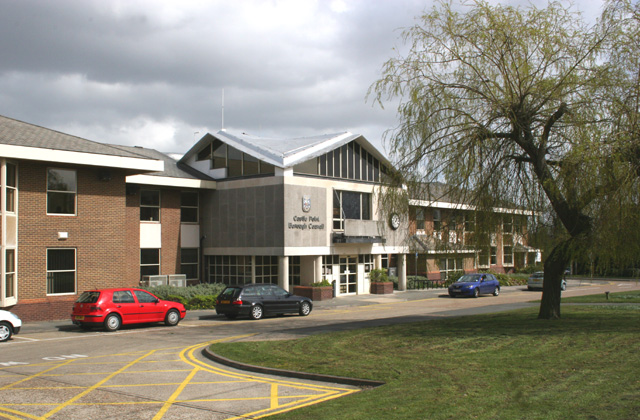
- Council Offices, Kiln Road, Thundersley, Benfleet, SS7 1TF

Website
- www.castlepoint.gov.uk

Castle Point Borough Council provides district-level services. County-level services are provided by Essex County Council. Canvey Island is a civil parish with a town council, forming a third tier of local government in that part of the borough. The mainland part of the borough (the former Benfleet Urban District) is an unparished area.

In December 2024 the Regulator of Social Housing issued a downgrade from a C3 to a C4 (the lowest consumer grade) after the council was found to not be able to demonstrate mitigation of fire risk, failed to survey the majority of their properties over the last 5 years, lacked up to date electrical assessments for 40% of communal areas, a lack of domestic abuse policy and being unable to demonstrate its response to hate crime.

=== Political control ===
Following the 2024 election, a majority of the seats on the council were held by local party the People's Independent Party, which won all the seats on the mainland part of the borough, but did not contest any seats on Canvey Island. All the seats on Canvey Island were won by another local party, the Canvey Island Independent Party. The two parties had been running the council as coalition since the 2022 election, when the council had been under no overall control. Despite holding all the council's seats between them following the 2024 election, the two parties agreed to continue to form a joint administration.

The first election to the council was held in 1973, initially operating as a shadow authority alongside the outgoing authorities until the new arrangements came into effect on 1 April 1974. Political control of the council since 1974 has been as follows:

Party in control	Years
Labour	1974–1976
Conservative	1976–1995
Labour	1995–2003
Conservative	2003–2014
No overall control	2014–2014
Conservative	2014–2022
No overall control	2022–2024
The People's Independent Party	2024–present

=== Leadership ===
The role of mayor is largely ceremonial in Castle Point. Political leadership is instead provided by the leader of the council. The leaders since 2014 have been:

Councillor	Party	From	To
Pam Challis	Conservative		May 2014
Colin Riley	Conservative	4 Jun 2014	May 2018
Norman Smith	Conservative	16 May 2018	15 Mar 2021
Jeffrey Stanley	Conservative	15 Mar 2021	May 2021
Andrew Sheldon	Conservative	19 May 2021	May 2022
Dave Blackwell	Canvey Island Independent Party	18 May 2022	

=== Composition ===
Following the 2024 election, and a subsequent by-election in May 2025 the composition of the council was:

Party	Councillors
The People's Independent Party	24
Canvey Island Independent Party	14
Reform UK	1
Total	39

Notably, Castle Point is currently one of only two councils in England where no seat is held by the Labour Party, the Conservatives, the Liberal Democrats or the Green Party; the other being the Isles of Scilly Council. The next election is due in 2026.

=== Premises ===
The council is based at the Council Offices on Kiln Road in Thundersley. The building was built in 1962 as the headquarters of the former Benfleet Urban District Council.

== Elections ==
Since the last boundary changes in 2024, the council has comprised 39 councillors representing 13 wards, with each ward electing three councillors. Elections are held every four years.

== Geography ==
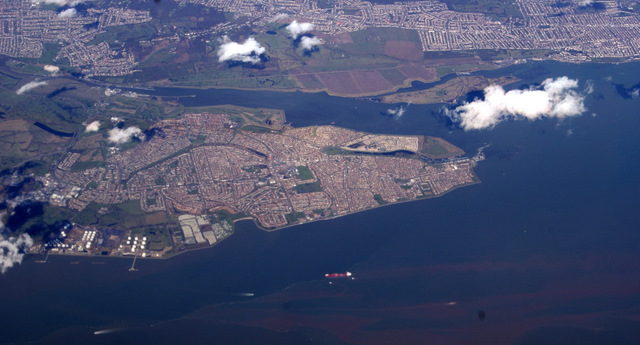
Canvey Island, one of the towns of the borough

The national land use tables published by MHCLG show that in 2017, 56.6% of the borough was covered by green spaces including agriculture, forest and open land, water and outdoor recreation spaces. Close to one-fifth (18.2%) was accounted for by residential gardens.

=== Climate ===
Climate in this area has mild differences between highs and lows, but despite adequate rainfall all year-round it is on average the driest part of the UK. The Köppen Climate Classification subtype for this climate is "Cfb" (Marine West Coast Climate/Oceanic climate).

Climate data for Castle Point
Month	Jan	Feb	Mar	Apr	May	Jun	Jul	Aug	Sep	Oct	Nov	Dec	Year
Mean daily maximum °C (°F)	8 (46)	8 (46)	11 (52)	13 (55)	17 (63)	20 (68)	22 (72)	22 (72)	19 (66)	15 (59)	11 (52)	8 (46)	15 (59)
Mean daily minimum °C (°F)	3 (37)	3 (37)	4 (39)	5 (41)	8 (46)	11 (52)	14 (57)	14 (57)	11 (52)	9 (48)	5 (41)	3 (37)	8 (46)
Average precipitation mm (inches)	46 (1.8)	35 (1.4)	41 (1.6)	38 (1.5)	33 (1.3)	33 (1.3)	30 (1.2)	30 (1.2)	36 (1.4)	41 (1.6)	41 (1.6)	41 (1.6)	445 (17.5)
Source: Weatherbase

== Demography ==
The median age of Castle Point's residents at the 2011 census was 45, compared to a regional average of 39 and national average of 40.

Castle Point has several estates laid out as seaside resorts for retirement, which is reflected in 7% of its population at the time of the 2011 census being aged 75 to 84, compared to 5.5% nationally.

== Transport ==
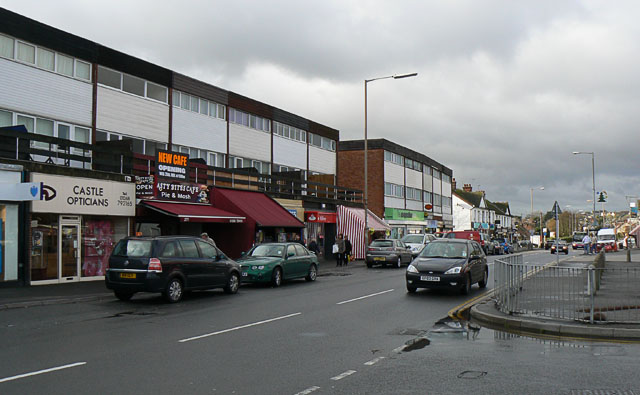
South Benfleet, one of the towns of the borough

The A13 crosses Castle Point and the A127 skirts it to the north, providing direct links to both Southend and London.

The only station in the borough is Benfleet railway station on the London, Tilbury and Southend line from London Fenchurch Street to Shoeburyness, operated by c2c.

Castle Point has an extensive bus network operated by the First Essex and Arriva Shires & Essex, with services across the borough and to Southend, Basildon, Lakeside Shopping Centre and Rayleigh. Weekday services by Stephensons of Essex also travel to London, Southend and Thurrock College and Regal Busways offers a six-day-a-week service to Chelmsford.

== Economy ==
The Daily Telegraph reported that economic output of jobs in Castle Point in 2022 was 59% of the national average, the lowest urban council area in England, by the 'Gross Value Added per Workforce Job' statistical measure. A third of jobs were part-time, above the England average of 23%, and many of the jobs were in the retail sector. The population has more retired people than average, 26% over age 65 compared to 19% in England at the last census, and the district's population has the second lowest rate in England of degree level qualification at 18.5%.

In 1959, Canvey Island received UK's first shipment of liquefied natural gas and was once a petrochemical industry hub, but that has reduced to two storage sites remaining. Large employer DP World London Gateway is nearby the district, but travel to there is difficult due to Holehaven Creek.

== Sport and community facilities ==
Waterside Farm Sports Centre, on Canvey Island is set in 88 acres (36 ha) of parkland and has a range of indoor and outdoor facilities, including a 25-metre swimming pool, a learner pool and facilities for badminton, squash, netball, basketball, trampolining and gymnastics. The centre also includes an outdoor 6 lane, 400-metre athletics track. Opposite the sports centre is the Castle Point Golf Course, an 18-hole par 71 public pay-and-play course with a 17-bay floodlit driving range.

Runnymede Pool is situated behind the Council Offices in Kiln Road. It has a 25-metre pool and a learner pool and is home to Runnymede Swimming Club.

== Twinning ==
Castle Point is twinned with three towns and counties:

- Romainville, a north-eastern Paris suburb, since 30 March 1962.
- Cologne District, Germany. Formally since 19 June 1971 when Lövenich (now part of Cologne) was an independent town.
- County Roscommon, Ireland. Twinned with Castle Point council in April 1998.

== Places of interest ==
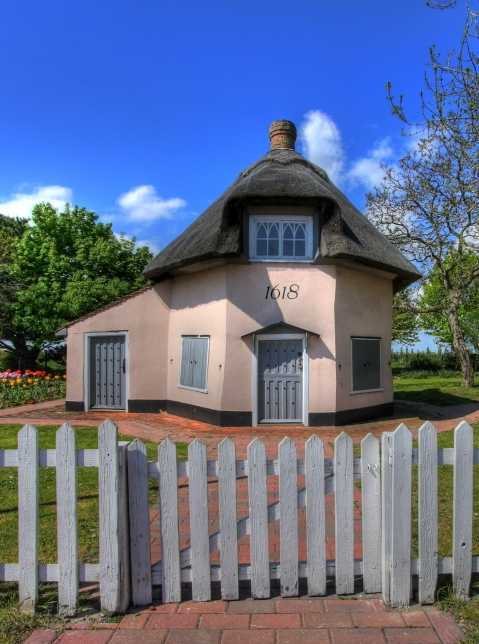
Dutch Cottage Museum

Hadleigh Castle is preserved as an ancient monument from the 13th century, forming the most important historic site in the borough and the most important late medieval castle in Essex. The Dutch Cottage Museum contains a variety of exhibits that illustrate the history of Canvey Island, and the Castle Point Transport Museum, also situated on Canvey in the retired District bus depot, features a display of over thirty old buses, coaches and commercial vehicles.

== Arms ==
Coat of arms of Borough of Castle Point

Notes
Granted 30 September 1987.
Crest
On a wreath Or Gules and Vert within a circlet of oyster shells Proper and between two stalks of wheat leaved Or a tower triple towered Gold.
Escutcheon
Per chevron embattled per pale Gules and Vert and barry wavy Argent and Azure in chief two ancient crowns Or and in base on a lozenge Vert a mound of earth issuant from its base and thereon a representation of a Canvey Island Dutch cottage Proper.
Motto
Societas Florebit (Fellowship Will Blossom)
