= Castle Point Borough Council elections =

Local government elections in Essex, England

Map showing the composition of Castle Point Borough Council as of 2024.

Castle Point Borough Council in Essex, England holds an election for the whole council every four years. From 2003 to 2023 a third of the council was elected every year for three years, with no election in the fourth. Since the last boundary changes in 2024, 39 councillors have been elected from 13 wards.

== Council elections ==
Summary of the council composition after recent council elections, click on the year for full details of each election.

Year	Conservative	Canvey Island Independent	UK Independence Party	Independent	People's Independent Party	Labour	Notes
1973	19	0	0	0	0	20	
1976	36	0	0	0	0	3	
1979	38	0	0	0	0	1	New ward boundaries
1983	38	0	0	0	0	1	
1987	39	0	0	0	0	0	District boundary changes took place but the number of seats remained the same
1991	36	0	0	0	0	3	
1995	5	0	0	0	0	34	
1999	15	0	0	0	0	24	
2003	39	0	0	0	0	2	New ward boundaries
2004	35	6	0	0	0	0	
2006	29	11	0	0	0	1	
2007	26	15	0	0	0	0	
2008	25	15	0	0	0	1	
2010	25	16	0	0	0	0	
2011	25	16	0	0	0	0	
2012	25	15	0	1	0	0	
2014	20	16	5	0	0	0	
2015	22	13	3	3	0	0	
2016	22	14	3	0	0	0	
2018	27	14	0	0	0	0	
2019	25	16	0	0	0	0	
2021	21	16	0	0	4	0	
2022	15	16	0	0	10	0	
2023	9	16	0	0	16	0	
2024	0	15	0	0	24	0	New ward boundaries

== Borough result maps ==
2003 results map

2004 results map

2006 results map

2007 results map

2008 results map

2010 results map

2011 results map

2012 results map

2014 results map

2015 results map

2016 results map

2018 results map

2019 results map

2021 results map

2022 results map

2023 results map

2024 results map

== By-election results ==
By-elections occur when seats become vacant between council elections. Below is a summary of recent by-elections; full by-election results can be found by clicking on the by-election name.

By-election	Date	Incumbent party	Winning party
Cedar Hall	10 April 1997	Labour	Labour
Canvey Island East	22 October 1998	Labour	Labour
St. Georges by-election	19 July 2001	Labour	Labour
Boyce by-election	30 September 2004	Conservative	Conservative
Canvey Island North by-election	8 September 2005	Conservative	Labour
St Marys by-election (first seat)	20 December 2007	Conservative	Conservative
St Marys by-election (second seat)	20 December 2007	Conservative	Labour
Canvey Island East by-election	30 October 2014	CIIP	Independent
St. George's by-election	5 May 2016	Conservative	Conservative
Boyce by-election	6 May 2021	Conservative	Conservative
St. George's by-election	6 May 2021	Conservative	Conservative
St. Peter's by-election	24 February 2022	Conservative	Conservative
Canvey Island Winter Gardens by-election	29 May 2025	CIIP	Reform
