= 2009 Essex County Council election =

UK local government election

- 4 June 2009

All 75 seats to Essex County Council 38 seats needed for a majority

	First party	Second party	Third party
Leader	Paul White	Tom Smith-Hughes	Paul Kirkman
Party	Conservative	Liberal Democrats	Labour
Leader since	>1998	May 2005	May 2005
Leader's seat	Stock	Chelmsford North	Pitsea (Defeated)
Last election	52 seats, 44.5%	8 seats, 22.9%	13 seat, 24.3%
Seats before	49	8	13
Seats won	60	12	1
Seat change	▲8	▲4	▼12
Popular vote	169,975	79,085	42,334
Percentage	43.3%	20.1%	10.8%
Swing	▼1.2%	▼2.8%	▼13.8%
	Fourth party	Fifth party	Sixth party
Leader	Chris Pond	Dave Blackwell	N/a
Party	Loughton Residents	CIIP	BNP
Leader since	May 2005	22 April 2004	N/a
Leader's seat	Loughton Central	N/a	N/a
Last election	1 seat, 0.4%	Did Not Stand	0 seats, 0.2%
Seats before	1	0	0
Seats won	1	1	0
Seat change	Steady	▲1	Steady
Popular vote	2,824	1,655	35,037
Percentage	0.7%	0.4%	8.9%
Swing	▲0.3%	▲0.4%	▲8.7%
	Seventh party
Party	Green
Last election	0 seats, 5.6%
Seats before	0
Seats won	0
Seat change	Steady
Popular vote	26,547
Percentage	6.8%
Swing	▲1.2%
- Results by electoral division.Conservatives in blue, Liberal Democrats in yellow, Labour in red and in grey the Canvey Island Independent Party and Independent Loughton Residents Association.
Council control before election
Conservative
Council control after election
Conservative

An election to Essex County Council took place on 4 June 2009 as part of the 2009 United Kingdom local elections. The elections had been delayed from 7 May, to coincide with elections to the European Parliament. 75 councillors were elected from various electoral divisions, which returned either one or two county councillors each by first-past-the-post voting for a four-year term of office. The electoral divisions were the same as those used at the previous election in 2005.

All locally registered electors (British, Irish, Commonwealth and European Union citizens) who were aged 18 or over on Thursday 2 May 2013 were entitled to vote in the local elections. Those who were temporarily away from their ordinary address (for example, away working, on holiday, in student accommodation or in hospital) were also entitled to vote in the local elections, although those who had moved abroad and registered as overseas electors cannot vote in the local elections. It is possible to register to vote at more than one address (such as a university student who had a term-time address and lives at home during holidays) at the discretion of the local Electoral Register Office, but it remains an offence to vote more than once in the same local government election.

== Previous composition ==
=== 2005 election ===
Party	Seats
Conservative	52
Labour	13
Liberal Democrats	8
Community Rep.	1
Loughton Residents	1
Total	75

=== Composition of council seats before election ===
Party	Seats
Conservative	49
Labour	13
Liberal Democrats	8
Tendring First	3
Loughton Residents	1
Independent	1
Total	75

== Summary ==
The Conservatives were re-elected with an increased majority. As in several other Tory councils, the Liberal Democrats replaced Labour as the main opposition party as Labour lost all but one seat, reflecting the Labour Party's declining national popularity at that time.

A notable feature of this election was the number of minor parties and local groups. These included right wing and anti-European parties, that appear to have siphoned support from the main parties and, in some divisions, out-polled them. Local groups enjoyed strong local support, challenging the successful candidates and winning seats.

== Results summary ==
In summaries, Labour and Labour Co-operative results are amalgamated. In multi-member divisions, the "majority" is the number of votes by which the loser with the highest number of votes fell short of being elected.

2009 Essex County Council election
Party	Seats	Gains	Losses	Net gain/loss	Seats %	Votes %	Votes	+/−
Conservative	60	12	4	▲8	80.0	43.3	169,975	−1.2
Liberal Democrats	12	4	0	▲4	16.0	20.1	79,085	−2.8
Labour	1	0	12	▼12	1.3	10.8	42,334	−13.8
Loughton Residents	1	0	0	Steady	1.3	0.7	2,764	+0.3
CIIP	1	1	0	▲1	1.3	0.4	1,655	N/A
BNP	0	0	0	Steady	0.0	8.9	35,037	+8.7
Green	0	0	0	Steady	0.0	6.8	26,547	+1.2
UKIP	0	0	0	Steady	0.0	4.6	18,186	+4.0
Tendring First	0	0	0	Steady	0.0	1.5	5,866	N/A
English Democrat	0	0	0	Steady	0.0	1.3	5,212	+1.2
Independent	0	0	0	Steady	0.0	1.1	4,322	+0.8
Community Rep.	0	0	1	▼1	0.0	0.4	1,523	−0.5

=== Election of Group Leaders ===
Paul White (Stock) was re elected leader of the Conservative Group and Tom Smith-Hughes (Chelmsford North) was re elected leader of the Liberal Democratic Group.

In April 2012, Smith-Hughes died after a long battle with cancer. Deputy leader Michael Mackrory (Springfield) was elected to replace him.

=== Election of Leader of the Council ===
Paul White the leader of the Conservative group was duly elected leader of the council and formed a conservative administration.

White was forced to resign after being charged with false accounting as part of the ongoing expenses scandal. Peter Martin (Chelmer) was elected as his successor, with David Finch (Hedingham) as his deputy.

== Results by District ==
=== Basildon ===
District Summary

Party	Seats	+/-	Votes	%	+/-
Conservative	9	▲4	31,648	43.4	−2.4
Labour	0	▼4	11,640	16.0	−15.5
Liberal Democrat	0	Steady	11,009	15.1	−3.1
BNP	0	Steady	10,114	13.9	+13.9
UKIP	0	Steady	7,648	10.5	+10.5
English Democrats	0	Steady	795	1.1	+0.7

Division Results

Basildon Westley Heights
Party	Candidate	Votes	%	±%
Conservative	John Schofield *	1,936	34.6	−3.3
Liberal Democrats	Geoffrey Williams	1,679	30.0	+1.4
UKIP	Imelda Clancy	711	12.7	N/A
Labour	Mark Witzer	679	12.1	−13.7
BNP	Geoffrey McCarthy	596	10.6	N/A
Majority		257	5.4	
Turnout		5,601	35.9	
Conservative hold		Swing		

Billericay and Burstead
Party	Candidate	Votes	%	±%
Conservative	Anthony Headley *	6,224	62.4	–3.4
Conservative	Kay Twitchen *	5,021	50.4	–0.2
UKIP	Susan McCaffery	1,721	17.3	N/A
Liberal Democrats	Martin Howard	1,638	16.4	–6.9
Liberal Democrats	Stephen Nice	1,519	15.2	–7.2
Labour	Margaret Viney	913	9.2	–6.9
English Democrat	Kim Gandy	795	6.6	N/A
BNP	Michael Bateman	735	7.4	N/A
Labour	Anthony Borlase	717	7.2	–7.1
BNP	Irene Bateman	656	6.6	N/A
Turnout		19,939	39.3	
Conservative hold				
Conservative hold				

Laindon Park and Fryerns
Party	Candidate	Votes	%	±%
Conservative	John Dornan	2,349	33.4	+0.1
Conservative	Terri Sargent	2,282	32.4	+0.8
Labour	William Archibald *	2,094	29.7	–24.6
Labour	Rachel Liebeschuetz *	1,686	23.9	–19.4
BNP	David King	1,612	22.9	N/A
BNP	Leonard Heather	1,608	22.8	N/A
Liberal Democrats	Arnold Lutton	1,240	17.6	+2.2
Liberal Democrats	Linda Williams	1,214	17.2	+4.7
Turnout		14,085	26.1	
Conservative gain from Labour				
Conservative gain from Labour				

Pitsea
Party	Candidate	Votes	%	±%
Conservative	David Abrahall	2,437	30.9	−4.5
Conservative	Sandra Hillier	2,122	26.9	–3.9
Labour	Keith Bobbin *	2,027	25.7	−24.6
Labour	Paul Kirkman *	1,836	23.3	–21.3
UKIP	Terry McBride	1,725	21.9	N/A
UKIP	Janet Davies	1,637	20.7	N/A
BNP	Philip Howell	1,439	18.2	N/A
BNP	Raymond Pearce	1,072	13.6	N/A
Liberal Democrats	Elizabeth Grant	788	10.0	–6.1
Liberal Democrats	Emma Peall	697	8.8	–5.4
Turnout		15,780	28.2	
Conservative gain from Labour				
Conservative gain from Labour				

Wickford Crouch
Party	Candidate	Votes	%	±%
Conservative	Don Morris *	4,732	54.2	−2.7
Conservative	Iris Pummell *	4,545	52.1	–2.1
UKIP	Ron Long	1,854	21.3	N/A
BNP	Anthony Gladwin	1,449	16.6	N/A
Liberal Democrats	Philip Jenkins	1,189	13.6	−2.1
Liberal Democrats	Benjamin Williams	1,045	12.0	–3.3
BNP	Christopher Roberts	947	10.9	N/A
Labour	Santa Bennett	875	10.0	−15.3
Labour	Patricia Rackley	813	9.3	–15.6
Turnout		17,449	34.1	
Conservative hold				
Conservative hold				

=== Braintree ===
District Summary

Party	Seats	+/-	Votes	%	+/-
Conservative	8	▲2	18,199	44.0	+0.8
Labour	0	▼2	5,675	13.7	−17.0
Liberal Democrat	0	Steady	5,266	12.7	−4.8
Green	0	Steady	4,613	11.1	+4.3
UKIP	0	Steady	3,052	7.4	+5.5
BNP	0	Steady	2,779	6.7	+6.7
English Democrats	0	Steady	1,814	4.4	+4.4

Division Results

Bocking
Party	Candidate	Votes	%	±%
Conservative	John Baugh	1,814	37.3	−0.1
Labour	Lynn Watson *	997	20.5	−19.6
UKIP	Gordon Helm	859	17.7	New
Liberal Democrats	Terry Brooks	572	11.8	−5.1
BNP	Carole Gladwin	318	6.5	New
Green	Nicholas Scales	299	6.2	+0.6
Majority		817	16.8	
Turnout		4,859	36.5	
Conservative gain from Labour		Swing		

Braintree Eastern
Party	Candidate	Votes	%	±%
Conservative	Nigel Edey *	2,316	45.5	+2.5
Labour	Eric Lynch	747	14.7	−18.9
Liberal Democrats	Paul Lemon	607	11.9	−2.7
Green	Andrea Bunn	554	10.9	+6.1
English Democrat	Perry Blye	493	9.7	New
BNP	Matthew Taylor	368	7.2	New
Majority		1,569	30.9	
Turnout		5,085	40.0	
Conservative hold		Swing		

Braintree Town
Party	Candidate	Votes	%	±%
Conservative	Graham Butland	1,575	35.3	−7.7
Labour	Elwyn Bishop *	876	19.6	−14.0
UKIP	Philip Shute	652	14.6	New
Liberal Democrats	Doug Rice	600	13.4	−1.2
Green	Wendy Partridge	279	6.2	+1.4
BNP	Paul Hooks	254	5.7	New
English Democrat	Albert Day	231	5.2	New
Majority		699	15.6	
Turnout		4,467	35.3	
Conservative gain from Labour		Swing		

Halstead
Party	Candidate	Votes	%	±%
Conservative	Joe Pike *	2,196	40.8	−6.2
UKIP	Michael Ford	790	14.7	New
Labour	Malcolm Fincken	600	11.2	−15.5
Liberal Democrats	Alan Crowe	584	10.9	−9.4
English Democrat	Raymond Brown	529	9.8	New
Green	Patricia Brunton	413	7.7	+1.7
BNP	Linda Henry	265	4.9	New
Majority		1,406	26.1	
Turnout		5,377	36.9	
Conservative hold		Swing		

Hedingham
Party	Candidate	Votes	%	±%
Conservative	David Finch *	3,329	54.5	+2.0
Liberal Democrats	Stephen Bolter	1,130	18.5	−4.6
Green	Agnes Wells	706	11.6	+5.4
BNP	Richard Higby	504	8.3	New
Labour	John Kotz	435	7.1	−11.1
Majority		2,199	38.8	
Turnout		6,104	44.7	
Conservative hold		Swing		

Three Fields with Great Notley
Party	Candidate	Votes	%	±%
Conservative	Roger Walters *	2,648	55.9	+4.0
Liberal Democrats	Peter Braley	612	12.9	−6.0
English Democrat	Colin Morris	561	11.8	New
Green	Stephen Hicks	412	8.7	+4.6
Labour	Moia Thorogood	274	5.8	−15.8
BNP	Michael Keeble	231	4.9	New
Majority		2,036	43.0	
Turnout		4,738	40.8	
Conservative hold		Swing		

Witham Northern
Party	Candidate	Votes	%	±%
Conservative	Michael Lager *	1,793	31.8	−6.0
Green	James Abbott	1,307	23.2	+6.5
Labour	Phillip Barlow	946	16.8	−18.2
UKIP	David Hodges	751	13.3	+8.8
Liberal Democrats	Pamela Hooper	490	8.7	+2.7
BNP	Robert Rundell	349	6.2	New
Majority		486	8.6	
Turnout		5,636	41.9	
Conservative hold		Swing		

Witham Southern
Party	Candidate	Votes	%	±%
Conservative	Derrick Louis *	2,528	49.3	+8.6
Labour	Lucy Barlow	800	15.6	−20.6
Liberal Democrats	Bernard Dearlove	671	13.1	−3.3
Green	Philip Hughes	643	12.5	+5.8
BNP	Rodney Leveridge	490	9.5	New
Majority		1,728	33.7	
Turnout		5,132	36.0	
Conservative hold		Swing		

=== Brentwood ===
District Summary

Party	Seats	+/-	Votes	%	+/-
Conservative	2	▼2	11,668	49.3	±0.0
Liberal Democrat	2	▲2	7,081	29.9	+0.3
Labour	0	Steady	1,739	7.3	−5.6
BNP	0	Steady	1,691	7.1	+7.1
UKIP	0	Steady	1,300	5.5	+0.2
English Democrats	0	Steady	198	0.8	+0.8

Division Results

Brentwood Hutton
Party	Candidate	Votes	%	±%
Conservative	John Roberts *	4,052	65.4	+7.6
Liberal Democrats	Ross Carter	1,119	18.1	−5.0
BNP	Clifford Houghton	602	9.7	New
Labour	Kees Maxey	420	6.8	−6.6
Majority		2,933	47.4	
Turnout		6,193	42.6	
Conservative hold		Swing		

Brentwood North
Party	Candidate	Votes	%	±%
Liberal Democrats	Barry Aspinell	2,698	45.5	+14.9
Conservative	Phil Baker *	2,397	40.4	−6.3
Labour	Michele Wigram	562	9.5	−3.5
BNP	Carolyn Rossiter	276	4.6	New
Majority		301	5.1	
Turnout		5,933	45.2	
Liberal Democrats gain from Conservative		Swing		

Brentwood Rural
Party	Candidate	Votes	%	±%
Conservative	Ann Naylor *	2,953	48.7	−1.0
UKIP	Yvonne Maguire	1,300	21.4	+15.0
Liberal Democrats	Karen Chilvers	991	16.3	−15.7
Labour	Dennis Norman	314	5.2	−3.5
BNP	Sidney Chaney	312	5.1	New
English Democrat	Maureen Davies	198	3.3	New
Majority		1,653	27.2	
Turnout		6,068	44.5	
Conservative hold		Swing		

Brentwood South
Party	Candidate	Votes	%	±%
Liberal Democrats	David Kendall	2,273	41.5	+7.6
Conservative	Lionel Lee *	2,266	41.3	+0.3
BNP	Kevin Swaby	501	9.1	New
Labour	Gareth Paul Barrett	443	8.1	−8.8
Majority		7	0.1	
Turnout		5,483	41.5	
Liberal Democrats gain from Conservative		Swing		

=== Castle Point ===
District Summary

Party	Seats	+/-	Votes	%	+/-
Conservative	4	▼1	11,303	47.0	−3.2
CIIP	1	▲1	3,437	14.3	+14.3
Labour	0	Steady	2,789	11.6	−22.7
BNP	0	Steady	2,760	11.5	+11.5
Liberal Democrat	0	Steady	1,678	7.0	−3.8
Green	0	Steady	1,168	4.9	+0.2
UKIP	0	Steady	916	3.8	+3.8

Division Results

Canvey Island East
Party	Candidate	Votes	%	±%
CIIP	Brian Wood	1,782	34.8	New
Conservative	Mark Howard *	1,612	31.5	−13.8
BNP	Laurence Morgan	852	16.7	New
Labour	John Payne	553	10.8	−31.1
Liberal Democrats	Nicole Nunn	316	6.2	−2.0
Majority		170	3.3	
Turnout		5,115	34.6	
CIIP gain from Conservative		Swing		

Canvey Island West
Party	Candidate	Votes	%	±%
Conservative	Ray Howard *	1,948	43.1	−7.7
CIIP	Peter May	1,655	36.6	New
BNP	John Morgan	505	11.2	New
Labour	Jackie Reilly	314	7.0	−31.0
Liberal Democrats	Ashley Final	97	2.2	−5.5
Majority		293	6.5	
Turnout		4,519	34.6	
Conservative hold		Swing		

Hadleigh
Party	Candidate	Votes	%	±%
Conservative	Jillian Reeves *	2,965	52.0	−3.6
Say No to European Union	Bob Eldridge	1,023	17.9	New
Labour Co-op	John Trollope	507	8.9	−15.9
Green	Lesley Morgan	427	7.5	−0.7
Liberal Democrats	Paul Westlake	406	7.1	−4.3
BNP	Peter Barber	378	6.6	New
Majority		1,942	34.0	
Turnout		5,706	42.3	
Conservative hold		Swing		

South Benfleet
Party	Candidate	Votes	%	±%
Conservative	Colin Riley *	2,702	54.0	+3.6
Labour	Emma Spicer	757	15.1	−16.2
BNP	Mark Cooling	652	13.0	New
Liberal Democrats	Jeni Goldfinch	475	9.5	−6.7
Green	Nanine Pachy	422	8.4	+6.3
Majority		1,945	38.8	
Turnout		5,008	38.7	
Conservative hold		Swing		

Thundersley
Party	Candidate	Votes	%	±%
Conservative	Bill Dick *	2,076	43.9	−4.9
UKIP	Jean Hulse	916	19.4	New
Labour Co-op	Joe Cooke	658	13.9	−22.6
Liberal Democrats	Ian Fuller	384	8.1	−2.1
BNP	Linda England	373	7.9	New
Green	Eileen Peck	319	6.7	+2.2
Majority		1,160	24.5	
Turnout		4,726	38.6	
Conservative hold		Swing		

=== Chelmsford ===
District Summary

Party	Seats	+/-	Votes	%	+/-
Liberal Democrat	5	Steady	15,366	31.6	−0.1
Conservative	4	Steady	21,470	44.1	+0.5
Green	0	Steady	3,493	7.1	+2.2
Labour	0	Steady	3,272	6.7	−11.3
BNP	0	Steady	3,203	6.6	+6.6
SWFCTA	0	Steady	1,076	2.2	+1.2
UKIP	0	Steady	785	1.6	+1.0

Division Results

Broomfield and Writtle
Party	Candidate	Votes	%	±%
Conservative	John Aldridge *	3,234	56.7	+11.3
Liberal Democrats	Don Bacon	1,176	20.6	−6.6
Green	Reza Hossain	489	8.6	+3.2
BNP	Daniel Warden	434	7.6	New
Labour Co-op	John Knott	369	6.5	−10.5
Majority		2,058	36.1	
Turnout		5,702	39.3	
Conservative hold		Swing		

Chelmer
Party	Candidate	Votes	%	±%
Conservative	Peter Martin *	3,431	57.9	+4.4
Liberal Democrats	David Whiteing	1,162	19.6	−3.1
Green	Eleanor Burgess	589	9.9	+3.4
Labour	David Howell	378	6.4	−10.9
BNP	Viktor Underwood	366	6.2	New
Majority		2,269	38.3	
Turnout		5,926	37.1	
Conservative hold		Swing		

Chelmsford Central
Party	Candidate	Votes	%	±%
Liberal Democrats	Margaret Hutchon	2,076	44.5	+6.6
Conservative	Robert Pontin	1,570	33.6	−1.7
Green	Peter Lynn	381	8.2	+2.3
Labour	Jonathan Legg	358	7.7	−13.2
BNP	Jay Slaven	284	6.1	New
Majority		506	10.8	
Turnout		4,669	39.6	
Liberal Democrats hold		Swing		

Chelmsford North
Party	Candidate	Votes	%	±%
Liberal Democrats	Tom Smith-Hughes *	2,418	46.7	+7.6
Conservative	Dick Madden	1,659	32.0	−3.3
Labour Co-op	Jim Webb	405	7.8	−16.5
Green	Angela Thomson	376	7.3	+1.4
BNP	Paul Maylin	323	6.2	New
Majority		759	14.6	
Turnout		5,181	38.7	
Liberal Democrats hold		Swing		

Chelmsford West
Party	Candidate	Votes	%	±%
Liberal Democrats	Jude Deakin	2,040	41.2	+5.2
Conservative	James Morgan	1,613	32.6	+3.0
Labour Co-op	Joan Bliss	546	11.0	−16.1
BNP	Christine Mitchell	376	7.6	New
Green	Nelson Brunton	372	7.5	+2.2
Majority		427	8.6	
Turnout		4,947	35.5	
Liberal Democrats hold		Swing		

Great Baddow
Party	Candidate	Votes	%	±%
Liberal Democrats	Maureen Miller *	2,545	40.9	+1.6
Conservative	Janette Potter	2,089	33.6	−3.6
UKIP	Jesse Pryke	785	12.6	New
Labour	James French	326	5.2	−13.6
Green	Colin Budgey	260	4.2	−0.5
BNP	Jemma Cutts	216	3.5	New
Majority		456	7.3	
Turnout		6,221	40.8	
Liberal Democrats hold		Swing		

South Woodham Ferrers
Party	Candidate	Votes	%	±%
Conservative	Norman Hume *	1,808	43.9	−7.6
SWFCTA	Ian Roberts	1,076	26.1	+15.6
Liberal Democrats	Barry Passingham	393	9.5	−6.9
BNP	Victor Scott	359	8.7	New
Labour	Margaret Vanner	291	7.1	−11.2
Green	Stephanie Bills	193	4.7	+1.4
Majority		732	17.8	
Turnout		4,120	32.8	
Conservative hold		Swing		

Springfield
Party	Candidate	Votes	%	±%
Liberal Democrats	Michael Mackrory *	2,845	45.7	+4.2
Conservative	Paul Hutchinson	2340	37.6	−0.7
BNP	Bernard Corby	403	6.5	New
Green	John Bills	340	5.5	New
Labour Co-op	Robert Jones	302	4.8	−15.4
Majority		505	8.1	
Turnout		6,230	40.7	
Liberal Democrats hold		Swing		

Stock
Party	Candidate	Votes	%	±%
Conservative	Paul White *	3,726	65.7	±0.0
Liberal Democrats	Angela Robinson	711	12.5	−12.2
Green	Richard Monk	493	8.7	−0.9
BNP	Charlotte Davis	442	7.8	New
Labour	Una Norman	297	5.2	New
Majority		3,015	53.2	
Turnout		5,669	42.1	
Conservative hold		Swing		

=== Colchester ===
District Summary

Party	Seats	+/-	Votes	%	+/-
Conservative	5	Steady	16,442	36.1	−1.3
Liberal Democrat	4	▲1	15,282	33.6	+2.3
Labour	1	▼1	5,498	12.1	−10.9
Green	0	Steady	4,683	10.3	+3.7
BNP	0	Steady	2,616	5.7	+5.7
UKIP	0	Steady	880	1.9	+1.9
Independent	0	Steady	107	0.2	−1.5

Division Results

Abbey
Party	Candidate	Votes	%	±%
Liberal Democrats	Margaret Fisher *	2,384	50.4	+7.5
Green	Linda Wonnacott	845	17.9	+6.9
Conservative	Darius Laws	828	17.5	−5.4
Labour	Rossanna Trudgian	365	7.7	−15.7
BNP	John Alfred Key	305	6.4	N/A
Majority		1,539	32.6	
Turnout		4,727	31.0	
Liberal Democrats hold		Swing		

Constable
Party	Candidate	Votes	%	±%
Conservative	Anne Brown	3,209	51.5	+1.4
UKIP	George Curtis	880	14.1	N/A
Liberal Democrats	Barry Woodward	821	13.2	−10.4
Green	Roger Bamforth	583	9.4	+2.6
Labour	David Alexander Hough	406	6.5	−13.0
BNP	James Butler	223	3.6	N/A
Independent	Bruno Hickman	107	1.7	N/A
Majority		2,329	37.4	
Turnout		6,229	42.6	
Conservative hold		Swing		

Drury
Party	Candidate	Votes	%	±%
Conservative	Jeremy Lucas *	2,402	40.6	−3.3
Liberal Democrats	John Loxley	2383	40.3	+7.6
Green	Stephen Ford	563	9.5	+2.8
Labour	Michael Donnachie	323	5.5	−11.0
BNP	Graham Carter	238	4.0	N/A
Majority		19	0.3	
Turnout		5,909	44.4	
Conservative hold		Swing		

Maypole
Party	Candidate	Votes	%	±%
Liberal Democrats	Lyn Barton	1,344	32.3	+0.5
Labour	Dave Harris	1,226	29.4	−5.4
Conservative	Roger Buston	1,021	24.5	−4.2
BNP	Daniel Hack	297	7.1	N/A
Green	Pamela Nelson	277	6.7	
Majority		118	2.1	
Turnout		4,165	32.5	
Liberal Democrats gain from Labour		Swing		

Mersea and Tiptree
Party	Candidate	Votes	%	±%
Conservative	John Jowers *	3,004	56.7	+12.7
Liberal Democrats	Jon Longman	900	17.0	+0.8
Green	Kathy Bamforth	562	10.6	+6.0
BNP	Michael Newbury	437	8.2	N/A
Labour	John Wood	395	7.5	−13.3
Majority		2,104	39.7	
Turnout		5,298	37.2	
Conservative hold		Swing		

Mile End and Highwoods
Party	Candidate	Votes	%	±%
Liberal Democrats	Anne Turrell *	2,509	54.2	+16.1
Conservative	Brian Jarvis	1,337	28.9	−8.8
Green	Mary Bryan	315	6.8	+1.0
Labour	Robert Fisher	262	5.7	−12.7
BNP	Benjamin Jones	209	4.5	N/A
Majority		1,172	25.3	
Turnout		4,632	34.3	
Liberal Democrats hold		Swing		

Parsons Heath and East Gates
Party	Candidate	Votes	%	±%
Liberal Democrats	Theresa Higgins *	2,183	49.3	+5.9
Conservative	Christopher Arnold	1,183	26.7	+3.2
Green	Maria Iacovou	419	9.5	+4.4
BNP	Gary Saveall	328	7.4	N/A
Labour	Adam Fox	317	7.2	−14.4
Majority		1,000	22.6	
Turnout		4,430	34.7	
Liberal Democrats hold		Swing		

Stanway and Pyefleet
Party	Candidate	Votes	%	±%
Conservative	Kevin Bentley	2,394	44.7	+0.4
Liberal Democrats	Colin Sykes	1,538	28.7	−2.4
Labour	Michael Lilley	551	10.3	−9.7
Green	Walter Schwarz	539	10.1	+4.5
BNP	Shaun Cuming	331	6.2	N/A
Majority		856	16.0	
Turnout		5,353	37.9	
Conservative hold		Swing		

Wivenhoe St Andrew
Party	Candidate	Votes	%	±%
Labour	Julie Young *	1,653	34.7	−2.4
Liberal Democrats	Mark Cory	1,220	25.6	+2.9
Conservative	Eugene Kraft	1,064	22.3	−3.0
Green	Chris Fox	580	12.2	+3.2
BNP	Samantha Paterson	248	5.2	N/A
Majority		433	9.1	
Turnout		4,765	33.0	
Labour hold		Swing		

=== Epping Forest ===
District Summary

Party	Seats	+/-	Votes	%	+/-
Conservative	5	▼1	16,009	43.9	−5.2
Liberal Democrat	1	▲1	6,921	19.0	−3.7
Loughton Residents	1	Steady	2,764	7.6	+2.9
BNP	0	Steady	3,809	10.4	+8.0
Labour	0	Steady	2,548	7.0	−10.5
Green	0	Steady	2,194	6.0	+3.1
UKIP	0	Steady	1,535	1.9	+4.2
English Democrat	0	Steady	505	1.4	+1.4
Independent	0	Steady	177	0.5	+0.5

Division Results

Buckhurst Hill and Loughton South
Party	Candidate	Votes	%	±%
Conservative	Valerie Metcalfe	2,601	40.1	−8.7
Liberal Democrats	Ann Haigh	1,952	30.1	−5.0
UKIP	Gerard Wadsworth	637	9.8	New
Green	Steven Neville	392	6.0	New
BNP	Alexander Copland	370	5.7	New
Labour	Tom Owen	359	5.5	−10.6
Independent	Neville Wright	177	2.7	New
Majority		649	10.0	
Turnout		6,488	41.4	
Conservative hold		Swing		

Chigwell and Loughton Broadway
Party	Candidate	Votes	%	±%
Conservative	John Knapman	2,363	53.2	+3.4
Labour	Ruth Montefiore	618	13.9	−6.7
BNP	Edward Butler	540	12.2	+3.9
Liberal Democrats	Katie Holmes	509	11.5	−6.4
Green	Chris Lord	410	9.2	+5.8
Majority		1,745	39.3	
Turnout		4,440	33.9	
Conservative hold		Swing		

Epping and Theydon Bois
Party	Candidate	Votes	%	±%
Liberal Democrats	Janet Whitehouse	2,481	42.3	+1.9
Conservative	James Surguy	2,080	35.5	−6.4
UKIP	Andrew Smith	581	9.9	New
BNP	Tony Frankland	306	5.2	New
Green	Daniel Kieve	219	3.7	+0.3
Labour	Simon Bullough	192	3.3	−6.6
Majority		401	6.8	
Turnout		5,859	45.9	
Liberal Democrats gain from Conservative		Swing		

Loughton Central
Party	Candidate	Votes	%	±%
Loughton Residents	Chris Pond *	2,764	55.2	+20.0
Conservative	Mitchell Cohen	911	18.2	−9.8
BNP	Rodney Law	529	10.6	+0.7
UKIP	Michael McGough	317	6.3	New
Labour	Martin Lawford	250	5.0	−12.2
Green	Jesse Briton	120	2.4	−1.1
Liberal Democrats	Christopher Spence	117	2.3	−3.9
Majority		1,853	37.0	
Turnout		5,008	37.6	
Loughton Residents hold		Swing		

North Weald and Nazeing
Party	Candidate	Votes	%	±%
Conservative	Anthony Jackson *	3,119	61.0	+2.7
BNP	Julian Leppert	612	12.0	New
Liberal Democrats	Matthew Lake	524	10.2	−7.7
Green	Nicola Harries	442	8.6	+3.0
Labour	Kelvin Morris	419	8.2	−10.0
Majority		2,507	49.0	
Turnout		5,116	37.9	
Conservative hold		Swing		

Ongar and Rural
Party	Candidate	Votes	%	±%
Conservative	Gerard McEwen *	2,358	53.0	−5.3
Liberal Democrats	Derek Jacobs	656	14.7	−3.2
English Democrat	Robin Tilbrook	505	11.3	New
BNP	Peter Turpin	380	8.5	New
Green	Jessica Barnecutt	288	6.5	+0.9
Labour	Sheila Spring	265	6.0	−12.2
Majority		1,702	38.2	
Turnout		4,452	37.3	
Conservative hold		Swing		

Waltham Abbey
Party	Candidate	Votes	%	±%
Conservative	Liz Webster *	2,577	50.5	−6.1
BNP	Patricia Richardson	1,072	21.0	New
Liberal Democrats	Pat Brooks	682	13.4	−0.9
Labour	Mitch Diamond-Conway	445	8.7	−15.5
Green	Nicky Fuller	323	6.3	+1.5
Majority		1,505	29.5	
Turnout		5,099	31.3	
Conservative hold		Swing		

=== Harlow ===
District Summary

Party	Seats	+/-	Votes	%	+/-
Conservative	4	▲3	9,968	35.3	−1.9
Labour	0	▼3	7,363	26.1	−15.3
Liberal Democrat	0	Steady	4,939	17.5	+0.3
BNP	0	Steady	4,092	14.5	+14.5
Green	0	Steady	1,858	6.6	+2.5

Division Results

Harlow North
Party	Candidate	Votes	%	±%
Conservative	Michael Garnett	1,838	33.2	−0.6
Labour	Paul Sztumpf *	1,378	24.9	−17.2
Liberal Democrats	Ian Jackson	1,129	20.4	+1.7
BNP	Geoffrey Williams	716	12.9	New
Green	Robert King	472	8.5	+3.1
Majority		460	8.3	
Turnout		5,533	35.4	
Conservative gain from Labour		Swing		

Harlow South East
Party	Candidate	Votes	%	±%
Conservative	Eddie Johnson *	1,956	40.8	−0.7
Labour	Mike Danvers	983	20.5	−17.1
Liberal Democrats	Linda Pailing	859	17.9	+0.6
BNP	Thomas Richardson	677	14.1	New
Green	Suzzanne King	320	6.7	+3.1
Majority		973	20.3	
Turnout		4,795	32.5	
Conservative hold		Swing		

Harlow West
Party	Candidate	Votes	%	±%
Conservative	Lee Dangerfield	3,235	36.2	–1.4
Conservative	Guy Mitchinson	2,939	32.9	–3.6
Labour	Tony Durcan *	2,549	28.5	−14.0
Labour	Jenny Holland *	2,453	27.4	–14.7
Liberal Democrats	Tim Sanderson	1,504	16.8	−0.7
Liberal Democrats	Manny Doku	1,447	16.2	+0.2
BNP	Paul Richard Evans	1,381	15.4	N/A
BNP	Scott Cato	1,318	14.7	N/A
Green	Cheryl Gerrard	1,066	11.9	+4.1
Turnout		17,892	32.7	
Conservative gain from Labour				
Conservative gain from Labour				

=== Maldon ===
District Summary

Party	Seats	+/-	Votes	%	+/-
Conservative	3	Steady	8,518	46.9	−4.4
Liberal Democrat	0	Steady	2,227	12.3	−4.9
Green	0	Steady	1,843	10.2	+2.5
Labour	0	Steady	1,539	8.5	−15.3
BNP	0	Steady	1,466	8.1	+8.1
UKIP	0	Steady	1,376	7.6	+7.6
Independent	0	Steady	1,180	6.5	+6.5

Division Results

Heybridge and Tollesbury
Party	Candidate	Votes	%	±%
Conservative	Rodney Bass *	3,338	53.9	
Liberal Democrats	Matthew Bellard	992	16.0	
Green	Robert Graves	803	13.0	
BNP	Adrian Litscher	585	9.4	
Labour	Norman Hunt	473	7.6	
Majority		2,346	37.9	
Turnout		6,191	39.6	
Conservative hold		Swing		

Maldon
Party	Candidate	Votes	%	±%
Conservative	Penny Channer	2,359	41.6	
Independent	Brian Mead *	1,180	20.8	
Liberal Democrats	Christopher Crowther	621	11.0	
Green	Janet Carden	600	10.6	
Labour	Michael Bentley	515	9.1	
BNP	Len Blain	391	6.9	
Majority		1,179	20.8	
Turnout		5,666	39.2	
Conservative hold		Swing		

Southminster
Party	Candidate	Votes	%	±%
Conservative	Bob Boyce *	2,821	44.8	
UKIP	Tim Drain	1,376	21.9	
Liberal Democrats	Marian Elsden	614	9.8	
Labour	Pauline Wells	551	8.8	
BNP	Nev Saveall	490	7.8	
Green	Jonathan King	440	7.0	
Majority		1,445	23.0	
Turnout		6,292	35.8	
Conservative hold		Swing		

=== Rochford ===
District Summary

Party	Seats	+/-	Votes	%	+/-
Conservative	5	Steady	11,718	49.1	−1.0
Liberal Democrat	0	Steady	4,449	18.6	−1.9
BNP	0	Steady	2,751	11.5	+11.5
Labour	0	Steady	1,823	7.6	−15.8
English Democrats	0	Steady	1,565	6.6	+6.6
Green	0	Steady	1,135	4.8	−1.3
UKIP	0	Steady	416	1.7	+1.7

Division Results

Rayleigh North
Party	Candidate	Votes	%	±%
Conservative	Stephen Castle *	2,095	38.3	
Liberal Democrats	Chris Black	1,739	31.8	
English Democrat	John Hayter	718	13.1	
UKIP	Tony Smith	416	7.6	
BNP	Lisa Byrne	278	5.1	
Labour	David Bodimeade	226	4.1	
Majority		356	6.5	
Turnout		5,472	41.8	
Conservative hold		Swing		

Rayleigh South
Party	Candidate	Votes	%	±%
Conservative	Mavis Webster *	2,165	48.9	
English Democrat	Paula Hayter	847	19.1	
Liberal Democrats	Lindsay Frend	777	17.6	
BNP	Donna-Marie Loughran	347	7.8	
Labour	Alan Bennett	289	6.5	
Majority		1,318	29.8	
Turnout		4,425	35.4	
Conservative hold		Swing		

Rochford North
Party	Candidate	Votes	%	±%
Conservative	Tracey Chapman *	2,490	51.7	
BNP	John Curtin	705	14.6	
Liberal Democrats	Debbie Taylor	679	14.1	
Green	Andrew Vaughan	618	12.8	
Labour	David Kirkman	328	6.8	
Majority		1,785	37.0	
Turnout		4,820	37.4	
Conservative hold		Swing		

Rochford South
Party	Candidate	Votes	%	±%
Conservative	Roy Pearson *	1,996	51.1	
BNP	Earl Strobridge	547	14.0	
Green	Douglas Copping	517	13.2	
Labour	David Lench	491	12.6	
Liberal Democrats	Lester Wakeling	354	9.1	
Majority		1,449	37.1	
Turnout		3,905	32.2	
Conservative hold		Swing		

Rochford West
Party	Candidate	Votes	%	±%
Conservative	Bonnie Hart *	2,972	56.8	
Liberal Democrats	Sid Cumberland	900	17.2	
BNP	Sandra Matthews	874	16.7	
Labour	Angelina Marriott	489	9.3	
Majority		2,072	39.6	
Turnout		5,235	38.2	
Conservative hold		Swing		

=== Tendring ===
District Summary

Party	Seats	+/-	Votes	%	+/-
Conservative	8	▲3	17,020	41.1	+0.2
Tendring First	0	Steady	5,866	14.2	+14.2
Liberal Democrat	0	Steady	4,758	11.5	−7.3
Labour	0	▼2	4,652	11.2	−16.0
BNP	0	Steady	3,974	9.6	+9.6
Green	0	Steady	2,972	7.2	+2.7
CRP	0	▼1	1,523	3.7	−5.5
UKIP	0	Steady	892	2.2	+2.2

Division Results

Brightlingsea
Party	Candidate	Votes	%	±%
Conservative	Derek Robinson *	2,387	43.0	−2.1
Liberal Democrats	Gary Scott	1577	28.4	+3.9
Labour Co-op	Tracey Osben	588	10.6	−14.6
BNP	Jim Taylor	537	9.7	New
Green	Stephen Whiteman	468	8.4	+3.2
Majority		810	14.6	
Turnout		5,557	39.0	
Conservative hold		Swing		

Clacton East
Party	Candidate	Votes	%	±%
Conservative	Linda Mead	2,270	42.6	−8.7
Tendring First	Pierre Oxley *	1,361	25.5	New
BNP	Keith Beaumont	626	11.8	New
Labour	Norman Jacobs	508	9.5	−19.3
Green	Eleanor Mary Gordon	325	6.1	+3.0
Liberal Democrats	Dominique Azid	238	4.5	−9.8
Majority		909	17.1	
Turnout		5,328	40.7	
Conservative hold		Swing		

Clacton North
Party	Candidate	Votes	%	±%
Conservative	Stephen Mayzes	1,566	39.8	+9.0
Liberal Democrats	Brian Whitson	782	19.9	−4.6
BNP	Loraine Henry	651	16.6	New
Labour Co-op	Delia Aldis	649	16.5	−22.9
Green	Robbie Spence	282	7.2	+4.8
Majority		784	19.9	
Turnout		3,930	31.4	
Conservative gain from Labour		Swing		

Clacton West
Party	Candidate	Votes	%	±%
Conservative	Chris Griffiths	1,639	40.0	+10.9
Tendring First	Kevin Watson	694	16.9	New
BNP	Tracey Worsley	606	14.8	New
Labour Co-op	Roy Raby	469	11.4	−15.8
Liberal Democrats	John Candler	348	8.5	−2.4
Green	Clare Palmer	223	5.4	+3.4
Community Rep.	Kenneth Sargeant	123	3.0	−27.8
Majority		945	23.0	
Turnout		4,102	35.5	
Conservative gain from Community Rep.		Swing		

Frinton and Walton
Party	Candidate	Votes	%	±%
Conservative	Mick Page *	3,215	46.2	−10.6
Tendring First	Terry Allen	2,253	32.4	New
BNP	Pat Henry	500	7.2	New
Green	Sandra Moog	500	7.2	+3.9
Labour Co-op	James Osben	495	7.1	−17.4
Majority		962	13.8	
Turnout		6,963	45.6	
Conservative hold		Swing		

Harwich
Party	Candidate	Votes	%	±%
Conservative	Ricky Callender	1,746	36.5	+15.8
Community Rep.	Steven Henderson	1,115	23.3	−8.0
Labour Co-op	Les Double *	996	20.8	−21.5
BNP	Anthony Evennett	331	6.9	New
Liberal Democrats	Kate Douglas	302	6.3	New
Green	Frank Barton	293	6.1	+0.4
Majority		631	13.2	
Turnout		4,783	37.0	
Conservative gain from Labour		Swing		

Tendring Rural East
Party	Candidate	Votes	%	±%
Conservative	Mick Skeels	2,002	35.3	−4.8
Tendring First	Mark Cossens *	1,271	22.4	New
Labour	Charlie Powell	589	10.4	−20.9
Liberal Democrats	Joyce O'Brien	528	9.3	−13.4
BNP	Peter Hack	518	9.1	New
Green	Chris Southall	447	7.9	+4.9
Community Rep.	Tony Colbourne	253	4.5	+2.3
Majority		731	12.9	
Turnout		5,608	38.7	
Conservative hold		Swing		

Tendring Rural West
Party	Candidate	Votes	%	±%
Conservative	Sarah Candy *	2,195	40.8	−5.1
Liberal Democrats	Ann Elvin	983	18.3	−20.4
UKIP	David Macdonald	892	16.6	New
Green	Duncan Gordon	434	8.1	−2.2
Labour	John Ford	358	6.6	New
Tendring First	Jack Robertson	287	5.3	New
BNP	Debbie Hack	205	3.8	New
Community Rep.	Martyn Donn	32	0.6	−4.4
Majority		1,212	22.5	
Turnout		5,386	40.9	
Conservative hold		Swing		

=== Uttlesford ===
District Summary

Party	Seats	+/-	Votes	%	+/-
Conservative	4	Steady	12,921	52.6	+4.3
Liberal Democrat	0	Steady	6,031	24.6	−9.4
Green	0	Steady	2,588	10.5	+3.6
BNP	0	Steady	1,383	5.6	+5.6
Labour	0	Steady	1,301	5.3	−4.3
English Democrat	0	Steady	335	1.4	+1.4

Division Results

Dunmow
Party	Candidate	Votes	%	±%
Conservative	Susan Barker *	3,780	60.9	+5.1
Liberal Democrats	Alan Thawley	906	14.6	−21.1
Green	Simon Whittle	632	10.2	+1.7
BNP	Lynne Turpin	500	8.1	New
Labour	Bill McCarthy	390	6.3	New
Majority		2,874	46.3	
Turnout		6,208	38.3	
Conservative hold		Swing		

Saffron Walden
Party	Candidate	Votes	%	±%
Conservative	Robert Chambers *	3,287	50.6	+8.7
Liberal Democrats	Richard Freeman	1506	23.2	−8.3
Green	Trilby Roberts	891	13.7	+6.9
Labour	Yvonne Morton	483	7.4	−7.9
BNP	Susan Clapp	332	5.1	New
Majority		1,781	27.4	
Turnout		6,499	42.3	
Conservative hold		Swing		

Stansted
Party	Candidate	Votes	%	±%
Conservative	Ray Gooding *	2,748	43.6	±0.0
Liberal Democrats	Alan Dean	2,651	42.0	+0.1
Green	Karmel Stannard	421	6.7	+2.1
BNP	George Martin	288	4.6	New
Labour	Barbara Light	198	3.1	−6.9
Majority		97	1.5	
Turnout		6,306	46.7	
Conservative hold		Swing		

Thaxted
Party	Candidate	Votes	%	±%
Conservative	Simon Walsh *	3,106	56.0	+3.4
Liberal Democrats	Ron Clover	968	17.5	−8.9
Green	Peter Vernon	644	11.6	+4.0
English Democrat	Gloria Meredew	335	6.0	New
BNP	Edward Long	263	4.7	New
Labour	Yad Zanganah	230	4.1	−9.3
Majority		2,138	38.6	
Turnout		5,546	41.3	
Conservative hold		Swing		

== By-elections ==
=== Harlow West ===
A by-election was held following the disqualification of Cllr Lee Dangerfield (Conservative) for non-attendance.

Harlow West: 5 May 2011
Party	Candidate	Votes	%	±%
Labour	Tony Durcan	5,320	48.4	+22.2
Conservative	Mark Gough	4,564	41.6	+8.4
Liberal Democrats	John Strachan	1,100	10.0	–5.4
Majority		756	6.8	N/A
Turnout		10,984		
Labour gain from Conservative		Swing	▲6.9	

No BNP (14.2%) or Green (11.0%) candidates as previous.

=== Chelmsford Central ===
A by-election was called following the death of Cllr Margaret Hutcheon (Liberal Democrat).

Chelmsford Central: 9 June 2011
Party	Candidate	Votes	%	±%
Conservative	Dick Madden	1,496	43.6	+10.0
Liberal Democrats	Graham Pooley	1,323	38.6	–5.9
Labour	Russell Kennedy	610	17.8	+10.1
Majority		173	5.0	N/A
Turnout		3,429		
Conservative gain from Liberal Democrats		Swing	▲8.0	

No Green (8.2%) or BNP (6.1%) candidates as previous.

=== Stock ===
A by-election was called due to the disqualification of Cllr Paul White, Lord Hanningfield (Conservative) after he was sentenced to nine months in prison for false accounting.

Stock: 8 September 2011
Party	Candidate	Votes	%	±%
Conservative	Ian Grundy	1,820	59.3	–6.4
UKIP	Jesse Pryke	736	24.0	N/A
Labour	Maurice Austin	275	9.0	+3.8
Liberal Democrats	Marian Elsden	160	5.2	–7.3
Green	Reza Hossain	80	2.6	–6.1
Majority		1,084	35.3	–17.9
Turnout		3,071		
Conservative hold		Swing	N/A	

No BNP candidate as previous (7.8%).

=== Chelmsford North ===
A by-election was called due to the death of Cllr Tom Smith-Hughes (Liberal Democrat).

Chelmsford North: 28 June 2012
Party	Candidate	Votes	%	±%
Liberal Democrats	Stephen Robinson	1,614	42.1	–4.6
Conservative	Robert Pontin	941	24.5	–7.5
Labour	Nastassia Player	711	18.5	+10.7
UKIP	Leslie Retford	435	11.3	N/A
Green	Reza Hossain	134	3.5	–3.8
Majority		673	17.6	+3.0
Turnout		3,835		
Liberal Democrats hold		Swing	▲1.5	

No BNP candidate as previous (6.2%).
