= 2014 Castle Point Borough Council election =

2014 UK local government election

Map of the results of the 2014 Castle Point Borough Council election. Canvey Island Independent Party in light grey, UK Independence Party in purple and Conservative in blue.

The 2014 Castle Point Borough Council election took place on 22 May 2014 to elect members of Castle Point Borough Council in Essex, England. One third of the council was up for election and the Conservative Party lost overall control of the council to no overall control.

After the election, the composition of the council was

- Conservative 20
- Canvey Island Independent Party 16
- UK Independence Party 5

== Background ==
At the last election in 2012 the Conservatives held control of the council with 25 councillors, compared to 15 for the Canvey Island Independent Party and 1 independent. However, since then the UK Independence Party had won 2 Castle Point seats at the 2013 Essex County Council election and planned to stand 8 candidates at the 2014 Borough Council election.

14 of the 41 seats on the council were contested at the 2014 election.

== Election result ==
The Conservatives lost their majority on the council after the UK Independence Party gained 5 seats. The UK Independence Party gains came in Appleton, Cedar Hall, St George's, St Peter's and Victoria wards, with 87-year-old UK Independence Party candidate Ron Hurrell defeating the Conservative leader of the council, Pam Challis, in St Peter's ward. Meanwhile, in the European elections that were held at the same time the UK Independence Party won 48% of the vote in Castle Point, almost double that of the Conservatives.

On Canvey Island the Canvey Island Independent Party regained a seat in Canvey Island South, which they had lost to a defection. The results left the Conservatives as the largest party on the council with 20 seats, while the Canvey Island Independent Party had 16 seats and the UK Independence Party had 5 seats.

Following the election the Conservative group on the council chose Colin Riley as their new leader defeating the former deputy leader of the council Jeffrey Stanley by 2 votes, while Alan Bayley became the leader of the UK Independence Party group. Both the Canvey Island Independent Party and UK Independence Party initially proposed a coalition between all 3 parties to run the council, but following the Conservative leadership election decided against coalition and Colin Riley became the new leader of the council at the head of a Conservative minority administration.

Castle Point local election result 2014
Party	Seats	Gains	Losses	Net gain/loss	Seats %	Votes %	Votes	+/−
CIIP	6	1	0	+1	42.9	23.2	5,543	+2.3%
UKIP	5	5	0	+5	35.7	26.9	6,431	+26.9%
Conservative	3	0	5	-5	21.4	33.9	8,098	-12.9%
Labour	0	0	0	0	0	16.0	3,822	-10.9%
Independent	0	0	1	-1	0	0	0	-2.4%

== Ward results ==
Appleton
Party	Candidate	Votes	%	±%
UKIP	Alan Bayley	856	44.0	+44.0
Conservative	Charles Mumford	728	37.4	−24.3
Labour	Elliott Adair	361	18.6	−19.7
Majority		128	6.6	
Turnout		1,945		
UKIP gain from Conservative		Swing		

Boyce
Party	Candidate	Votes	%	±%
Conservative	Norman Smith	927	46.1	−28.0
UKIP	Robert Baillie	823	40.9	+40.9
Labour	Anthony Wright	261	13.0	−12.9
Majority		104	5.2	−43.1
Turnout		2,011		
Conservative hold		Swing		

Canvey Island Central
Party	Candidate	Votes	%	±%
CIIP	Peter May	964	65.1	+1.6
Conservative	Raymond Savill	324	21.9	+1.6
Labour	John Payne	192	13.0	−3.2
Majority		640	43.2	+0.0
Turnout		1,480		
CIIP hold		Swing		

Canvey Island East
Party	Candidate	Votes	%	±%
CIIP	Alan Acott	1,006	66.8	+18.8
Conservative	Patricia Haunts	318	21.1	−2.4
Labour	Margaret McArthur-Curtis	182	12.1	−0.7
Majority		688	45.7	+21.2
Turnout		1,506		
CIIP hold		Swing		

Canvey Island North
Party	Candidate	Votes	%	±%
CIIP	Nigel Harvey	1,067	63.7	−1.0
Conservative	Margaret Belford	325	19.4	+0.8
Labour	Matthew Reilly	283	16.9	+0.2
Majority		742	44.3	−1.8
Turnout		1,675		
CIIP hold		Swing		

Canvey Island South
Party	Candidate	Votes	%	±%
CIIP	Barry Palmer	1,035	62.3	+14.5
Conservative	Denise Lambert	458	27.6	+2.5
Labour	Michael Curham	168	10.1	−0.6
Majority		577	34.7	+11.9
Turnout		1,661		
CIIP gain from Independent		Swing		

Canvey Island West
Party	Candidate	Votes	%	±%
CIIP	Jane King	636	50.1	+7.4
Conservative	Jeanette Blissett	509	40.1	−9.2
Labour	William Deal	124	9.8	+1.8
Majority		127	10.0	
Turnout		1,269		
CIIP hold		Swing		

Canvey Island Winter Gardens
Party	Candidate	Votes	%	±%
CIIP	Peter Greig	835	64.3	+1.8
Conservative	Jeanette Carrington	283	21.8	+0.9
Labour	Katie Curtis	181	13.9	−2.7
Majority		552	42.5	+1.0
Turnout		1,299		
CIIP hold		Swing		

Cedar Hall
Party	Candidate	Votes	%	±%
UKIP	Alan Hudson	897	49.4	+49.4
Conservative	Colin Maclean	610	33.6	−25.1
Labour	Bernard Thorne	310	17.1	−24.2
Majority		287	15.8	
Turnout		1,817		
UKIP gain from Conservative		Swing		

St George's
Party	Candidate	Votes	%	±%
UKIP	Brian Wood	710	43.0	+43.0
Conservative	Pamela Freeman	525	31.8	−21.9
Labour	Joseph Cooke	417	25.2	−21.1
Majority		185	11.2	
Turnout		1,652		
UKIP gain from Conservative		Swing		

St. James'
Party	Candidate	Votes	%	±%
Conservative	Godfrey Isaacs	886	43.9	−16.9
UKIP	Michael Dixon	790	39.2	+39.2
Labour	Dina Mehdi	340	16.9	−4.3
Majority		96	4.8	34.8
Turnout		2,016		
Conservative hold		Swing		

St. Mary's
Party	Candidate	Votes	%	±%
Conservative	Andrew Sheldon	771	40.3	−11.9
UKIP	Michael Aubrey	726	37.9	+37.9
Labour	Brian Wilson	418	21.8	−26.0
Majority		45	2.3	−2.0
Turnout		1,915		
Conservative hold		Swing		

St. Peter's
Party	Candidate	Votes	%	±%
UKIP	Ronald Hurrell	830	45.1	+45.1
Conservative	Pamela Challis	680	36.9	−27.1
Labour	William Emberson	331	18.0	−18.0
Majority		150	8.1	
Turnout		1,841		
UKIP gain from Conservative		Swing		

Victoria
Party	Candidate	Votes	%	±%
UKIP	Paul Varker	799	44.2	+44.2
Conservative	Neal Warren	754	41.7	−22.9
Labour	Frederick West	254	14.1	−5.7
Majority		45	2.5	
Turnout		1,807		
UKIP gain from Conservative		Swing		

== By-elections between 2014 and 2015 ==
A by-election was held in Canvey Island East on 30 October 2014 after Canvey Island Independent Party councillor Gail Barton was removed from the council for not attending any council meetings for 8 months. The UK Independence Party did not put up a candidate for the by-election, instead supporting the Canvey Island Independent Party candidate, while the Canvey Island Independents agreed to support the UK Independence Party at the 2015 general election. However the seat was gained by independent candidate Colin Letchford with a majority of 66 votes over the Canvey Island Independent Party.

Meanwhile, following the by-election, councillor Stephen Cole defected from the Canvey Island Independent Party to the Conservatives, with the agreement between the Canvey Island Independent Party and the UK Independence Party being cited as a factor in his decision. This meant following the by-election and defection the Conservatives regained a one-seat majority on the council with 21 seats, compared to 14 for the Canvey Island Independent Party, 5 for the UK Independence Party and 1 independent.

Canvey Island East by-election 30 October 2014
Party	Candidate	Votes	%	±%
Independent	Colin Letchford	389	39.1	+39.1
Canvey Island Independent Party	John Payne	323	32.4	−34.4
Conservative	Chas Mumford	208	20.9	−0.2
Labour	Jackie Reilly	76	7.6	−4.5
Majority		66	6.6	
Turnout		996	20.9	
Independent gain from CIIP		Swing		
