= Canvey Island Independent Party =

- Leader: David Blackwell
- Treasurer: Michael John Fuller
- Nominating Officer: Robert James Ford
- Founded: 22 April 2004
- Headquarters: 96 Central Avenue; Canvey Island; Essex
- Ideology: Localism; Separate local council for Canvey Island
- Castle Point Borough Council: 14 / 39
- Essex County Council (Castle Point seats): 0 / 5

Website
- ciip.org.uk

The Canvey Island Independent Party (CIIP) is a local political party active on Canvey Island, in Essex, England. It was established in 2004 by Labour councillor Dave Blackwell to campaign for a separate district council for Canvey Island. With The People's Independent Party, they have formed the administration on Castle Point Borough Council since 2022.

== History ==
Castle Point borough map with South Benfleet in the north in red and Canvey Island in the south in off-white. Inset shows all of Essex.

Canvey Island became a single civil parish in 1881, replacing 17 former divisions that had existed in broadly the same form since the Norman era. In 1926, the parish was converted to the Canvey Island Urban District, which governed the island as a distinct entity. The urban district was dissolved along with the mainland Benfleet Urban District in the Local Government Act 1972 to form the local government district of Castle Point along with mainland Benfleet, Hadleigh, and Thundersley, ending Canvey Island's existence as a separate entity in local government.

Blackwell was elected as a Labour councillor in 1995, but he felt restricted by national politics. The Canvey Island Independents were established in 2004 to campaign for a return to Canvey Island's autonomy, which had been abolished 32 years previously. They argued that the current local government arrangements – which saw more councillors elected to the borough council from the mainland – were unfair to the residents of Canvey Island. There are more seats outside Canvey, despite Canvey's population almost equalling the other districts, and in 2020 CIIP took a petition to Downing Street about this with over 10,000 signatures. Local government reorganisation would require a request from the borough council and approval from the secretary of state. They submitted plans for Castle Point to move from a cabinet to a committee system, which were rejected, and also campaigned for more power to be devolved to Canvey Island Town Council, a parish council subordinate to Castle Point, which is responsible for limited services and facilities on the island. They have campaigned for a third road from Canvey to the mainland. Issues fuelling support for CIIP include difficulty driving off the island, housing, and flooding and poor drainage, and feeling neglected by councillors based in mainland Benfleet. Academic James Ker-Lindsay says such separatism movements stem from identity and a desire for decision-making at the right level.

In 2019, CIIP opposed the Conservative administration's local plan to build 5,000 new homes in the borough. CIIP favours devolution and did not take a position on the Local Government Reorganisation due for 2027.

== Election results ==
Since its formation the Canvey Island Independent Party has contested elections on a yearly basis, with representation at borough and county council level. It is also active at the parish level, with Canvey Island Independents sitting on Canvey Island Town Council. It only stands in seats on Canvey and not South Benfleet. The party does not contest Parliamentary elections.

=== Borough Council elections ===
The Canvey Island Independents have been represented continuously on Castle Point Borough Council since their first election in 2004, first winning three seats, then five, eventually winning all but one of the Canvey seats by 2020. They were consistently the second-largest group on the council, behind the ruling Conservatives until the 2022 elections, in which they came in first place after the Conservatives lost six seats. In 2015, they formed an electoral pact with Ukip to form an administration after the elections if they together had more seats than the Conservatives. Ukip agreed not to stand in Canvey and CIIP supported Ukip's parliamentary candidate, local councillor and group leader Jamie Huntman. In 2022, an increase in votes and seats for The People's Independent Party on Castle Point Borough Council saw the Conservatives lose power and a joint PIP and CIIP administration was formed, with Dave Blackwell elected leader of the council. In 2024 CIIP won all 15 seats on Canvey, but lost a by-election to Reform in May 2025 following the death of Peter Grieg, part of a national trend of losses by independents to Reform.

Year	Councillors	Control
2004	6 / 41	Conservative
2006	11 / 41	Conservative
2007	15 / 41	Conservative
2008	15 / 41	Conservative
2010	16 / 41	Conservative
2011	16 / 41	Conservative
2012	15 / 41	Conservative
2014	16 / 41	No overall control
2015	13 / 41	Conservative
2016	14 / 41	Conservative
2018	14 / 41	Conservative
2019	16 / 41	Conservative
2021	16 / 41	Conservative
2022	16 / 41	No overall control
2023	16 / 41	No overall control
2024	15 / 39	The People's Independent Party

=== County council elections ===
The Canvey Island Independents were represented on Essex County Council since the 2009 election, having failed to secure either seat on Canvey Island at the elections in 2005. They won both Canvey Island seats at the 2017 election, taking one from the Conservatives, and retained them at the 2021 election, but lost them to Reform in May 2026.

Year	Castle Point Councillors	Control
2005	0 / 5	Conservative
2009	1 / 5	Conservative
2013	1 / 5	Conservative
2017	2 / 5	Conservative
2021	2 / 5	Conservative
2026	0 / 5	Reform
