= 2019 Castle Point Borough Council election =

2019 UK local government election

The 2019 Castle Point Borough Council election took place on 2 May 2019 to elect members of Castle Point Borough Council in England.

== Results summary ==
2019 Castle Point Borough Council election
Party	This election			Full council			This election		
Party	Seats	Net	Seats %	Other	Total	Total %	Votes	Votes %	+/−
Conservative	8	▼2	57.1	16	24	60.0	8,789	44.8	-6.3
CIIP	6	▲2	42.9	10	16	40.0	4,721	24.1	+1.9
Labour	0	Steady	0.0	0	0	0.0	3,421	17.4	-2.6
Independent	0	Steady	0.0	0	0	0.0	1,735	8.8	+7.5
UKIP	0	Steady	0.0	0	0	0.0	591	3.0	-1.3
Liberal Democrats	0	Steady	0.0	0	0	0.0	351	1.8	+0.6

== Ward results ==
=== Appleton ===
Appleton
Party	Candidate	Votes	%	±%
Conservative	Eoin Egan	795	52.3	−12.1
Independent	Lynsey McCarthy-Calvert	487	32.0	New
Labour	Rosalind Dunhill	239	15.7	−5.4
Majority		308	20.3	
Turnout				
Conservative hold		Swing		

=== Boyce ===
Boyce
Party	Candidate	Votes	%	±%
Conservative	Chas Mumford	822	47.9	−24.8
Labour	Gwyn Bailey	594	34.6	+16.6
Independent	Robert Baillie	300	17.5	New
Majority		228	13.3	
Turnout				
Conservative hold		Swing		

=== Canvey Island Central ===
Canvey Island Central
Party	Candidate	Votes	%	±%
CIIP	Dave Blackwell	897	71.2	
Conservative	John Stone	228	18.1	
Labour	Kieran Smith	134	10.6	
Majority		669	53.1	
Turnout				
CIIP hold		Swing		

=== Canvey Island East ===
Canvey Island East
Party	Candidate	Votes	%	±%
CIIP	Martin Tucker	855	64.9	
Conservative	Susan Richardson	362	27.5	
Labour Co-op	Jackie Reilly	100	7.6	
Majority		493	37.4	
Turnout				
CIIP gain from Conservative		Swing		

=== Canvey Island North ===
Canvey Island North
Party	Candidate	Votes	%	±%
CIIP	Michael Fuller	1,002	71.9	+10.1
Conservative	Owen Cartey	271	19.5	+4.2
Labour Co-op	Maggie McArthur-Curtis	120	8.6	−8.3
Majority		731	52.4	
Turnout				
CIIP hold		Swing		

=== Canvey Island South ===
Canvey Island South
Party	Candidate	Votes	%	±%
CIIP	Janice Payne	607	39.7	−32.2
Independent	Colin Letchford	604	39.5	New
Conservative	Scott Griffin	247	16.2	−11.8
Labour Co-op	Elizabeth Anderson	71	4.6	−4.6
Majority		3	0.5	
Turnout				
CIIP hold		Swing		

=== Canvey Island West ===
Canvey Island West
Party	Candidate	Votes	%	±%
CIIP	David Thomas	516	48.9	
Conservative	Ray Howard	468	44.3	
Labour	Bill Scott	72	6.8	
Majority		48	4.6	
Turnout				
CIIP gain from Conservative		Swing		

=== Canvey Island Winter Gardens ===
Canvey Island Winter Gardens
Party	Candidate	Votes	%	±%
CIIP	Graham Withers	844	67.1	
Conservative	Sean Quartermaine	254	20.2	
Labour	David Manclark	160	12.7	
Majority		590	46.9	
Turnout				
CIIP hold		Swing		

=== Cedar Hall ===
Cedar Hall
Party	Candidate	Votes	%	±%
Conservative	Colin Maclean	1,025	76.3	
Labour	Brendan Duffield	319	23.7	
Majority		706	52.6	
Turnout				
Conservative hold		Swing		

=== St. George's ===
St. George's
Party	Candidate	Votes	%	±%
Conservative	Steven Cole	789	67.1	
Labour Co-op	Joe Cooke	387	32.9	
Majority		402	34.2	
Turnout				
Conservative hold		Swing		

=== St. James ===
St. James
Party	Candidate	Votes	%	±%
Conservative	Jacqui Thornton	732	39.8	
Independent	Brian Allars	344	18.7	
UKIP	Brian Lee	310	16.9	
Labour	Milton Dunmow	227	12.4	
Liberal Democrats	Miles Hopkins	224	12.2	
Majority		388	21.1	
Turnout				
Conservative hold		Swing		

=== St. Mary's ===
St. Mary's
Party	Candidate	Votes	%	±%
Conservative	James Cutler	985	71.8	
Labour	Christine Shaw	387	28.2	
Majority		598	43.6	
Turnout				
Conservative hold		Swing		

=== St. Peter's ===
St. Peter's
Party	Candidate	Votes	%	±%
Conservative	Bill Dick	1,004	75.2	
Labour	Christopher Tobin	331	24.8	
Majority		673	50.4	
Turnout				
Conservative hold		Swing		

=== Victoria ===
Victoria
Party	Candidate	Votes	%	±%
Conservative	Colin Riley	807	54.0	
UKIP	David Gibson	281	18.8	
Labour Co-op	Tom Harrison	280	18.7	
Liberal Democrats	Geoff Duff	127	8.5	
Majority		526	35.2	
Turnout				
Conservative hold		Swing		
