= 2004 Castle Point Borough Council election =

2004 UK local government election

Map of the results of the 2004 Castle Point Borough Council election. Conservative in blue and Canvey Island Independent Party in light grey. Wards in dark grey were not contested in 2004.

The 2004 Castle Point Borough Council election took place on 10 June 2004 to elect members of Castle Point Borough Council in Essex, England. One third of the council was up for election and the Conservative Party stayed in overall control of the council.

After the election, the composition of the council was:

- Conservative 35
- Canvey Island Independent Party 6

== Background ==
Before the election the Conservatives controlled the council with 39 councillors, while both Labour and the Canvey Island Independent Party had 1 seat. The Canvey Island Independent Party had been formed by ex-Labour councillor Dave Blackwell after he quit Labour in January 2004. The party wanted Canvey Island to have its own council and police division.

== Election results ==
The Conservatives remained in control of the council, but lost 4 seats to the Canvey Island Independent Party. This reduced the Conservatives to 35 councillors, while the Canvey Island Independent Party became the only opposition on the council with 6 seats. The Canvey Island Independent Party won all 5 seats they had contested including defeating the only Labour councillor Terry Blackwell.

Castle Point local election result 2004
Party	Seats	Gains	Losses	Net gain/loss	Seats %	Votes %	Votes	+/−
Conservative	8	0	4	-4	61.5	48.8	11,145	-12.0
CIIP	5	5	0	+5	38.5	16.7	3,820	+16.7
Labour	0	0	1	-1	0.0	27.1	6,193	-10.5
Green	0	0	0	0	0.0	6.3	1,449	+5.1
Independent	0	0	0	0	0.0	0.7	163	+0.4
Third Way	0	0	0	0	0.0	0.2	47	+0.2
Respect	0	0	0	0	0.0	0.2	44	+0.2

== Ward results ==
Appleton
Party	Candidate	Votes	%	±%
Conservative	Thomas Skipp	1,183	64.6	
Labour	John Trollope	649	35.4	
Majority		534	29.1	
Turnout		1,832	34.6	+4.5
Conservative hold		Swing		

Boyce
Party	Candidate	Votes	%	±%
Conservative	Christopher Freeman	1,185	63.9	
Labour	Anthony Wright	416	22.4	
Green	Nanine Othni	254	13.7	
Majority		769	41.5	
Turnout		1,855	36.3	+7.9
Conservative hold		Swing		

Canvey Island Central
Party	Candidate	Votes	%	±%
CIIP	John Anderson	751	44.2	
Labour	Terry Blackwell	456	26.8	
Conservative	Nigel King	452	26.6	
Green	Christopher Keene	40	2.4	
Majority		295	17.4	
Turnout		1,699	33.1	+10.4
CIIP gain from Labour		Swing		

Canvey Island East
Party	Candidate	Votes	%	±%
CIIP	Anne Wood	847	45.7	
Conservative	Winnifred Day	510	27.5	
Labour	Jackie Reilly	449	24.2	
Third Way	Keith Low	47	2.5	
Majority		337	18.2	
Turnout		1,853	36.0	+10.5
CIIP gain from Conservative		Swing		

Canvey Island North
Party	Candidate	Votes	%	±%
CIIP	Martin Tucker	846	47.6	
Labour	Mark Reilly	457	25.7	
Conservative	Heather Searle	406	22.8	
Green	Irene Willis	70	3.9	
Majority		389	21.9	
Turnout		1,779	34.8	+14.8
CIIP gain from Conservative		Swing		

Canvey Island South
Party	Candidate	Votes	%	±%
CIIP	Brian Wood	750	41.9	
Conservative	Jeffrey Stanley	581	32.5	
Labour	Mike Curham	248	13.9	
Independent	L Hart	163	9.1	
Green	Clifford Hughes	48	2.7	
Majority		169	9.4	
Turnout		1,790	35.1	+7.9
CIIP gain from Conservative		Swing		

Canvey Island Winter Gardens
Party	Candidate	Votes	%	±%
CIIP	Barry Dixie	626	45.5	
Conservative	Keneth Moore	460	33.5	
Labour	Margaret McArthur-Curtis	245	17.8	
Respect	Robert Chapman	44	3.2	
Majority		166	12.1	
Turnout		1,375	26.4	+5.9
CIIP gain from Conservative		Swing		

Cedar Hall
Party	Candidate	Votes	%	±%
Conservative	Norman Ladzrie	1,170	67.8	
Labour	Lorna Trollope	556	32.2	
Majority		614	35.6	
Turnout		1,726	36.9	+6.6
Conservative hold		Swing		

St Georges
Party	Candidate	Votes	%	±%
Conservative	Elizabeth Govier	1,007	60.5	
Labour	Joseph Cooke	657	39.5	
Majority		350	21.0	
Turnout		1,664	35.3	+6.8
Conservative hold		Swing		

St James'
Party	Candidate	Votes	%	±%
Conservative	W Sharp	1,131	57.9	
Green	Vikki Copping	425	21.8	
Labour	Daniel Regan	397	20.3	
Majority		706	36.1	
Turnout		1,953	39.1	+10.9
Conservative hold		Swing		

St Mary's
Party	Candidate	Votes	%	±%
Conservative	David Cross	942	52.7	
Labour	Brian Wilson	844	47.3	
Majority		98	5.5	
Turnout		1,786	35.6	+6.6
Conservative hold		Swing		

St Peter's
Party	Candidate	Votes	%	±%
Conservative	Beverley Egan	1,084	60.4	
Labour	M Gamble	423	23.6	
Green	Peck	288	16.0	
Majority		661	36.8	
Turnout		1,795	35.4	+5.8
Conservative hold		Swing		

Victoria
Party	Candidate	Votes	%	±%
Conservative	Enid Isaacs	1,034	59.0	
Labour	Robert Peters	396	22.6	
Green	Douglas Copping	324	18.5	
Majority		638	36.4	
Turnout		1,754	38.0	+8.9
Conservative hold		Swing		

== By-elections between 2004 and 2006 ==
=== Boyce ===
Boyce by-election 30 September 2004
Party	Candidate	Votes	%	±%
Conservative		699	64.0	+0.1
Labour		278	25.4	+3.0
Green		116	10.6	−3.1
Majority		421	38.5	−3.0
Turnout		1,093	21.5	−14.8
Conservative hold		Swing		

=== Canvey Island North ===
Canvey Island North by-election 8 September 2005
Party	Candidate	Votes	%	±%
Labour	Mark Reilly	399	45.8	+20.1
Canvey Island Independent Party		315	36.1	−11.5
Conservative		131	15.0	−7.8
Liberal Democrats		27	3.1	+3.1
Majority		84	9.6	
Turnout		872	16.6	−18.2
Labour gain from Conservative		Swing		
