= 2012 Castle Point Borough Council election =

2012 UK local government election

Map of the results of the 2012 Castle Point Borough Council election. Conservative in blue and Canvey Island Independent Party in light grey. Wards in dark grey were not contested in 2012.

The 2012 Castle Point Borough Council election took place on 3 May 2012 to elect members of Castle Point Borough Council in Essex, England. One third of the council was up for election and the Conservative Party stayed in overall control of the council.

After the election, the composition of the council was:

- Conservative 25
- Canvey Island Independent Party 15
- Independent 1

== Background ==
Since the last election in 2011, 3 councillors for the Canvey Island Independent Party, Joan Liddiard, Anne and Brian Wood, formed their own Canvey Independent Group, after Brian Wood had been expelled from the party in November 2011. Anne and Brian Wood stood at the 2012 election as independent candidates, along with 13 candidates each from the Conservative and Labour parties, 5 from the Canvey Island Independent Party and 2 from the Green Party.

One Conservative councillor, Enid Isaacs of Victoria ward, stood down at the election.

== Election result ==
The Conservatives retained a 9-seat majority on the council after holding all of the seats they had been defending. The closest they came to losing a seat was in St Mary's ward where they held on with a majority of 63 votes over Labour, which meant Labour failed to win any seats at the election. Meanwhile, the Canvey Island Independent Party regained seats in both Canvey East and Canvey South defeating independents Anne and Brian Wood.

Castle Point local election result 2012
Party	Seats	Gains	Losses	Net gain/loss	Seats %	Votes %	Votes	+/−
Conservative	8	0	0	0	61.5	46.8	8,018	-6.3
CIIP	5	2	0	+2	38.5	20.9	3,578	-0.9
Labour	0	0	0	0	0.0	26.9	4,603	+5.0
Green	0	0	0	0	0.0	3.0	517	-0.1
Independent	0	0	2	-2	0.0	2.4	410	+2.4

== Ward results ==
Appleton
Party	Candidate	Votes	%	±%
Conservative	Thomas Skipp	849	61.7	−3.9
Labour	Elliott Adair	526	38.3	+3.9
Majority		323	23.5	−7.6
Turnout		1,375		
Conservative hold		Swing		

Boyce
Party	Candidate	Votes	%	±%
Conservative	Jeffrey Stanley	983	74.1	−2.1
Labour	Lorna Trollope	343	25.9	+2.1
Majority		640	48.3	−4.0
Turnout		1,326		
Conservative hold		Swing		

Canvey Island Central
Party	Candidate	Votes	%	±%
CIIP	John Anderson	754	63.5	−0.4
Conservative	Patricia Haunts	241	20.3	−1.7
Labour	Bill Deal	192	16.2	+2.1
Majority		513	43.2	+1.3
Turnout		1,187		
CIIP hold		Swing		

Canvey Island East
Party	Candidate	Votes	%	±%
CIIP	Gail Barton	595	48.0	−8.2
Conservative	Lydia Parkin	291	23.5	−6.3
Independent	Anne Wood	195	15.7	+15.7
Labour	Maggie McArthur-Curtis	158	12.8	−1.2
Majority		304	24.5	−1.9
Turnout		1,239		
CIIP gain from Independent		Swing		

Canvey Island North
Party	Candidate	Votes	%	±%
CIIP	Martin Tucker	913	64.7	+5.9
Conservative	Mark Howard	262	18.6	−6.7
Labour	Esther Akinnuwa	236	16.7	+0.8
Majority		651	46.1	+12.6
Turnout		1,411		
CIIP hold		Swing		

Canvey Island South
Party	Candidate	Votes	%	±%
CIIP	Barry Campagna	624	47.8	−7.8
Conservative	Chas Mumford	327	25.1	−8.1
Independent	Brian Wood	215	16.5	+16.5
Labour	Matthew Reilly	139	10.7	−0.5
Majority		297	22.8	+0.5
Turnout		1,305		
CIIP gain from Independent		Swing		

Canvey Island Winter Gardens
Party	Candidate	Votes	%	±%
CIIP	Steven Cole	692	62.5	+7.9
Conservative	Kay Mullaly	232	20.9	−10.3
Labour	Katie Curtis	184	16.6	+2.4
Majority		460	41.5	+18.0
Turnout		1,108		
CIIP hold		Swing		

Cedar Hall
Party	Candidate	Votes	%	±%
Conservative	Liz Wass	720	58.7	+12.4
Labour	Laura Ward	507	41.3	+13.3
Majority		213	17.4	+6.9
Turnout		1,227		
Conservative hold		Swing		

St. George's
Party	Candidate	Votes	%	±%
Conservative	Clive Walter	607	53.7	−8.1
Labour	Joe Cooke	524	46.3	+8.1
Majority		83	7.3	−16.3
Turnout		1,131		
Conservative hold		Swing		

St. James'
Party	Candidate	Votes	%	±%
Conservative	Bill Sharp	982	60.8	−5.9
Labour	Fred Jones	343	21.2	+2.1
Green	Douglas Copping	290	18.0	+3.8
Majority		639	39.6	−8.0
Turnout		1,615		
Conservative hold		Swing		

St. Mary's
Party	Candidate	Votes	%	±%
Conservative	David Cross	762	52.2	−10.9
Labour	Brian Wilson	699	47.8	+10.9
Majority		63	4.3	−21.9
Turnout		1,461		
Conservative hold		Swing		

St. Peter's
Party	Candidate	Votes	%	±%
Conservative	Beverley Egan	822	64.0	−1.5
Labour	Bill Emberson	463	36.0	+13.1
Majority		359	27.9	−14.7
Turnout		1,285		
Conservative hold		Swing		

Victoria
Party	Candidate	Votes	%	±%
Conservative	Simon Hart	940	64.6	−2.3
Labour	Dina Mehdi	289	19.8	−0.8
Green	Lesley Morgan	227	15.6	+3.1
Majority		651	44.7	−1.6
Turnout		1,456		
Conservative hold		Swing		
