= 2010 Castle Point Borough Council election =

2010 UK local government election

Map of the results of the 2010 Castle Point Borough Council election. Conservative in blue and Canvey Island Independent Party in light grey.

The 2010 Castle Point Borough Council election took place on 6 May 2010 to elect members of Castle Point Borough Council in Essex, England. One third of the council was up for election and the Conservative Party stayed in overall control of the council.

After the election, the composition of the council was:

- Conservative 25
- Canvey Island Independent Party 16

== Background ==
8 people stood at the council election as Independent Save Our Green Belt candidates backed by the MP for Castle Point Bob Spink. Spink had resigned from the Conservative Party in 2008 and stood at the 2010 general election as an independent.

== Election result ==
In an election held at the same time as the 2010 general election and therefore seeing a higher turnout than in most council elections, the Conservatives stayed in control of the council after defeating competition from independent candidates. Twenty-two-year-old Conservative Andrew Sheldon picked up one seat in St Mary's ward to become the youngest councillor, defeating the only Labour councillor, Brian Wilson. However the Conservatives also lost a seat to the Canvey Island Independent Party in Canvey West.

Castle Point local election result 2010
Party	Seats	Gains	Losses	Net gain/loss	Seats %	Votes %	Votes	+/−
Conservative	8	1	1	0	57.1	43.7	19,566	-8.5
CIIP	6	1	0	+1	42.9	20.0	8,940	-3.0
Independent Save Our Green Belt	0	0	0	0	0.0	19.0	8,481	+19.0
Labour	0	0	1	-1	0.0	16.5	7,361	+0.4
Liberal Democrats	0	0	0	0	0.0	0.9	399	+0.9

== Ward results ==
Appleton
Party	Candidate	Votes	%	±%
Conservative	Pam Freeman	1,644	45.9	−27.3
Independent Save Our Green Belt	Lee Gardiner	1,228	34.3	+34.3
Labour	Lorna Trollope	713	19.9	−6.9
Majority		416	11.6	−34.8
Turnout		3,585		
Conservative hold		Swing		

Boyce
Party	Candidate	Votes	%	±%
Conservative	Norman Smith	2,068	56.2	−7.6
Independent Save Our Green Belt	Douglas Beard	1,146	31.1	+31.1
Labour	Tony Wright	468	12.7	−0.4
Majority		922	25.0	−15.6
Turnout		3,682		
Conservative hold		Swing		

Canvey Island Central
Party	Candidate	Votes	%	±%
CIIP	Peter May	1,579	54.2	−6.1
Conservative	Stewart Topley	913	31.3	+2.5
Labour	Daniel Curtis	421	14.5	+3.6
Majority		666	22.9	−8.5
Turnout		2,913		
CIIP hold		Swing		

Canvey Island East
Party	Candidate	Votes	%	±%
CIIP	John Payne	1,572	52.1	−7.1
Conservative	James Parkin	1,041	34.5	+3.2
Labour	Alan Curtis	402	13.3	+3.8
Majority		531	17.6	−10.3
Turnout		3,015		
CIIP hold		Swing		

Canvey Island North
Party	Candidate	Votes	%	±%
CIIP	Nick Harvey	1,675	51.1	−0.6
Conservative	Pat Haunts	1,046	31.9	+12.1
Labour	John Payne	561	17.1	+7.1
Majority		630	19.2	−12.7
Turnout		3,283		
CIIP hold		Swing		

Canvey Island South
Party	Candidate	Votes	%	±%
CIIP	Joan Liddard	1,565	50.2	+5.2
Conservative	Mark Howard	1,146	36.8	+4.6
Labour	Katie Curtis	406	13.0	+5.4
Majority		419	13.4	+0.6
Turnout		3,117		
CIIP hold		Swing		

Canvey Island West
Party	Candidate	Votes	%	±%
CIIP	Jane King	1,000	45.2	+13.3
Conservative	Colin MacLean	926	41.9	−18.8
Labour	Bill Deal	285	12.9	+5.5
Majority		74	3.3	
Turnout		2,211		
CIIP gain from Conservative		Swing		

Canvey Island Winter Gardens
Party	Candidate	Votes	%	±%
CIIP	Peter Greig	1,549	53.9	−5.5
Conservative	Richard Bender	951	33.1	+1.9
Labour	Maggie McArthur-Curtis	373	13.0	+3.6
Majority		598	20.8	−7.4
Turnout		2,873		
CIIP hold		Swing		

Cedar Hall
Party	Candidate	Votes	%	±%
Conservative	Maryse Iles	1,510	46.5	−29.3
Independent Save Our Green Belt	Duncan McFarlane	1,142	35.2	+35.2
Labour	Ian Harris	595	18.3	−5.9
Majority		368	11.3	−40.3
Turnout		3,247		
Conservative hold		Swing		

St Georges
Party	Candidate	Votes	%	±%
Conservative	Andy Cole	1,505	47.1	−22.0
Independent Save Our Green Belt	Charles McLaughlin	891	27.9	+27.9
Labour	Joe Cooke	797	25.0	−5.9
Majority		614	19.2	−19.0
Turnout		3,193		
Conservative hold		Swing		

St James
Party	Candidate	Votes	%	±%
Conservative	Godfrey Isaacs	1,882	50.7	−20.5
Independent Save Our Green Belt	Darryl Godbold	1,303	35.1	+35.1
Labour	Fred Jones	530	14.3	−0.2
Majority		579	15.6	−41.1
Turnout		3,715		
Conservative hold		Swing		

St Mary's
Party	Candidate	Votes	%	±%
Conservative	Andrew Sheldon	1,617	48.7	−6.9
Independent Save Our Green Belt	Neil Hamper	960	28.9	+28.9
Labour	Brian Wilson	744	22.4	−8.0
Majority		657	19.8	−5.4
Turnout		3,321		
Conservative gain from Labour		Swing		

St Peter's
Party	Candidate	Votes	%	±%
Conservative	Pamela Challis	1,733	50.4	−19.3
Independent Save Our Green Belt	Lynn McFarlane	735	21.4	+21.4
Labour	Bill Emberson	570	16.6	−0.8
Liberal Democrats	John Hardy	399	11.6	+11.6
Majority		998	29.0	−23.3
Turnout		3,437		
Conservative hold		Swing		

Victoria
Party	Candidate	Votes	%	±%
Conservative	Cliff Brunt	1,584	50.2	−21.1
Independent Save Our Green Belt	Sally Hardes	1,076	34.1	+34.1
Labour	Harry Brett	496	15.7	+2.2
Majority		508	16.1	−39.9
Turnout		3,156		
Conservative hold		Swing		
