= 2016 Castle Point Borough Council election =

2016 UK local government election

The 2016 Castle Point Borough Council election took place on 5 May 2016 to elect members of Castle Point Borough Council in England. This was on the same day as other local elections.

== Results summary ==
Castle Point Borough Council election, 2016
Party	Seats	Gains	Losses	Net gain/loss	Seats %	Votes %	Votes	+/−
Conservative	22	0	0	Steady		38.6	7,313	-7.8
CIIP	14	0	0	Steady		15.5	3,090	-1.8
UKIP	3	0	0	Steady		31.4	6,241	+11.3
Labour	0	0	0	Steady		15.2	3,019	-0.3
Liberal Democrats	0	0	0	Steady		1.1	211	N/A

== Ward results ==
=== Appleton ===
Appleton
Party	Candidate	Votes	%	±%
Conservative	Tom Skipp	832	49.3	−0.1
UKIP	Lee Gardiner	566	33.5	−1.0
Labour	Gwyneth Bailey	289	17.1	+1.0
Majority				
Turnout				
Conservative hold		Swing		

=== Boyce ===
Boyce
Party	Candidate	Votes	%	±%
Conservative	Jeffrey Stanley	803	47.7	−4.0
UKIP	Robert Baillie	604	35.9	−0.3
Labour	Anthony Wright	275	16.4	+3.3
Majority				
Turnout				
Conservative hold		Swing		

=== Canvey Island Central ===
Canvey Island Central
Party	Candidate	Votes	%	±%
CIIP	John Anderson	650	46.2	−10.6
UKIP	Judith McKinlay	394	28.0	New
Conservative	James Cutler	215	15.3	−12.9
Labour	Bill Scott	130	9.2	−5.9
Liberal Democrats	John Hardy	19	1.4	New
Majority				
Turnout				
CIIP hold		Swing		

=== Canvey Island East ===
Canvey Island East
Party	Candidate	Votes	%	±%
CIIP	Carole Sach	518	37.0	+0.1
UKIP	Sarah Mahoney	488	34.9	New
Conservative	Wayne Johnson	264	18.9	−18.5
Labour	Jackie Reilly	130	9.3	New
Majority				
Turnout				
CIIP hold		Swing		

=== Canvey Island North ===
Canvey Island North
Party	Candidate	Votes	%	±%
CIIP	John Payne	557	36.5	−16.3
UKIP	Daniel Frost	514	33.7	New
Conservative	David Manclark	308	20.2	−11.6
Labour	Sonia Mutch	147	9.6	−6.5
Majority		742	44.3	−1.8
Turnout		1,675		
CIIP hold		Swing		

=== Canvey Island South ===
Canvey Island South
Party	Candidate	Votes	%	±%
CIIP	Barry Campagna	786	50.9	+11.3
UKIP	Sam Aubrey	410	26.6	New
Conservative	Anthony Belford	269	17.4	−20.0
Labour	Michael Curham	79	5.1	−6.0
Majority				
Turnout				
CIIP hold		Swing		

=== Canvey Island Winter Gardens ===
Canvey Island Winter Gardens
Party	Candidate	Votes	%	±%
CIIP	Allan Taylor	576	46.1	−0.8
UKIP	Lucy Parkin	298	23.8	New
Conservative	Raymond Cattermole	224	17.9	−16.0
Labour	Margaret McArthur-Curtis	154	12.3	−6.9
Majority				
Turnout				
CIIP hold		Swing		

=== Cedar Hall ===
Cedar Hall
Party	Candidate	Votes	%	±%
Conservative	Elizabeth Wass	738	48.3	−1.8
UKIP	James Parkin	513	33.5	0.0
Labour	Bernard Thorne	278	18.2	+1.7
Majority				
Turnout				
Conservative hold		Swing		

=== St. George's ===
St George's
Party	Candidate	Votes	%	±%
Conservative	Arthur Walter	616	42.3	−5.1
UKIP	Karen Parkin	437	30.0	−1.9
Labour	Joseph Cooke	404	27.7	+7.0
Majority				
Turnout				
Conservative hold		Swing		

==== By-election ====
A by-election to the ward was held the same day following the death of Jacqui Govier.

St George's by-election
Party	Candidate	Votes	%	±%
Conservative	Steven Cole	630	43.6	−3.8
UKIP	William Wright	432	29.9	−2.0
Labour	Frederick West	384	26.6	+5.9
Majority				
Turnout				
Conservative hold		Swing		

=== St. James ===
St. James'
Party	Candidate	Votes	%	±%
Conservative	Bill Sharp	838	48.8	−8.0
UKIP	Rob Hemmings	455	26.5	−1.2
Labour	Dina Mehdi	234	13.6	−2.9
Liberal Democrats	Geoff Duff	192	11.2	New
Majority				
Turnout				
Conservative hold		Swing		

=== St. Mary's ===
St. Mary's
Party	Candidate	Votes	%	±%
Conservative	David Cross	628	39.6	−8.8
UKIP	James Smith	546	34.5	+0.4
Labour	Jack Rawlings	411	25.9	+8.4
Majority				
Turnout				
Conservative hold		Swing		

=== St. Peter's ===
St. Peter's
Party	Candidate	Votes	%	±%
Conservative	Beverley Egan	718	47.3	−2.0
UKIP	Sandra Aubrey	594	39.1	+5.3
Labour	William Emberson	207	13.6	−3.3
Majority				
Turnout				
Conservative hold		Swing		

=== Victoria ===
Victoria
Party	Candidate	Votes	%	±%
Conservative	Simon Hart	860	55.0	+1.0
UKIP	Samuel Parkin	422	27.0	−3.9
Labour	Tom Harrison	281	18.0	+2.9
Majority				
Turnout				
Conservative hold		Swing		
