= 1991 Castle Point District Council election =

1991 UK local government election

The 1991 Castle Point Borough Council election took place on 2 May 1991 to elect members of Castle Point Borough Council in Essex, England.

== Results summary ==
1991 Castle Point Borough Council election
Party	Seats	Gains	Losses	Net gain/loss	Seats %	Votes %	Votes	+/−
Conservative	36				92.3	55.9	38,451	
Labour	3				7.7	29.5	20,309	
Liberal Democrats	0				0.0	11.6	7,767	
Green	0				0.0	1.9	1,333	
Ind. Conservative	0				0.0	0.8	573	
Independent	0				0.0	0.5	342	
