= 2015 Castle Point Borough Council election =

2015 UK local government election

Results of the 2015 Castle Point Borough Council election

A by-thirds 2015 Castle Point Borough Council election took place on 7 May 2015 to elect 14 of the 41 members of the Castle Point Borough Council in England. It was part of the English local elections which coincided with the 2015 general election. The result produced a Conservative-affiliated councillor gain, resulting in a Conservative majority of two councillors.

== Results ==
=== Summary ===
Castle Point Borough Council election, 2015
Party	Seats	Gains	Losses	Net gain/loss	Seats %	Votes %	Votes	+/−
Conservative	22	1	0	+1	54	45	20126	
CIIP	13	0	1	-1	32	17	7815	
UKIP	3	0	0	0	7	20	9085	
Labour	0	0	0	0	0	15	7001	
Independent	3	0	0	0	7	3	1149	

=== Ward results ===
Appleton
Party	Candidate	Votes	%	±%
Conservative	Eugene Egan	1,833	49.4	+12.0
UKIP	James Parkin	1,282	34.6	−9.4
Labour	Roy English	596	16.1	−2.5
Majority				
Turnout				
Conservative hold		Swing		

Boyce
Party	Candidate	Votes	%	±%
Conservative	Wendy Goodwin	1,938		
UKIP	Robert Baillie	1,356		
Labour	Anthony Wright	454		
Majority				
Turnout				
Conservative hold		Swing		

Canvey Island Central
Party	Candidate	Votes	%	±%
CIIP	David Blackwell	1,678		
Conservative	Anthony Bensusan	834		
Labour	Sonia Mutch	445		
Majority				
Turnout				
CIIP hold		Swing		

Canvey Island East
Party	Candidate	Votes	%	±%
Conservative	Charles Mumford	996		
CIIP	Lee Barrett	988		
Independent	Joan Liddiard	678		
Labour	Jacqueline Reilly	345		
Majority				
Turnout				
Conservative gain from CIIP		Swing		

Canvey Island North
Party	Candidate	Votes	%	±%
CIIP	Grace Watson	1,664		
Conservative	Vera Partridge	1,013		
Labour	Matthew Reilly	513		
Majority				
Turnout				
CIIP hold		Swing		

Canvey Island South
Party	Candidate	Votes	%	±%
CIIP	Janice Payne	1,254		
Conservative	Matthew Stanley	1,089		
Independent	Elizabeth Swan	471		
Labour	John Payne	350		
Majority				
Turnout				
CIIP hold		Swing		

Canvey Island West
Party	Candidate	Votes	%	±%
Conservative	Raymond Howard	1,141		
CIIP	Katie Saunders	848		
Labour	William Deal	267		
Majority				
Turnout				
Conservative hold		Swing		

Canvey Island Winter Gardens
Party	Candidate	Votes	%	±%
CIIP	Neville Watson	1,383		
Conservative	Patricia Haunts	1,001		
Labour	Margaret McArthur-Curtis	565		
Majority				
Turnout				
CIIP hold		Swing		

Cedar Hall
Party	Candidate	Votes	%	±%
Conservative	Colin Maclean	1,640		
UKIP	Sarah Mahoney	1,096		
Labour	Bernard Thorne	539		
Majority				
Turnout				
Conservative hold		Swing		

St. George's
Party	Candidate	Votes	%	±%
Conservative	Jacqueline Govier	1,506		
UKIP	Daniel Frost	1,012		
Labour	Joseph Cooke	658		
Majority				
Turnout				
Conservative hold		Swing		

St. James
Party	Candidate	Votes	%	±%
Conservative	Norman Ladzrie	2,062		
UKIP	James Smith	1,024		
Labour	Dina Mehdi	610		
Majority				
Turnout				
Conservative hold		Swing		

St. Mary's
Party	Candidate	Votes	%	±%
Conservative	Alfred Partridge	1,633		
UKIP	Michael Aubrey	1,153		
Labour	Brian Wilson	590		
Majority				
Turnout				
Conservative hold		Swing		

St. Peter's
Party	Candidate	Votes	%	±%
Conservative	William Dick	1,681		
UKIP	Luke Spillman	1,154		
Labour	William Emberson	576		
Majority				
Turnout				
Conservative hold		Swing		

Victoria
Party	Candidate	Votes	%	±%
Conservative	Colin Riley	1,759		
UKIP	Patricia Blackmore	1,008		
Labour	Frederick West	493		
Majority				
Turnout				
Conservative hold		Swing		
