= 1987 Castle Point District Council election =

1987 English local government election

- 7 May 1987

All 39 seats to Castle Point District Council 20 seats needed for a majority

	First party	Second party
Party	Conservative	Labour
Seats won	39	0
Seat change	▲1	▼1
Popular vote	48,016	18,827
Percentage	64.7%	25.4%
Swing	▲1.0%	▼3.1%
Council control before election
Conservative
Council control after election
Conservative

The 1987 Castle Point District Council election took place on 7 May 1987 to elect members of Castle Point District Council in Essex, England. This was on the same day as other local elections.

== Summary ==
=== Election result ===
1987 Castle Point District Council election
Party	Candidates	Seats	Gains	Losses	Net gain/loss	Seats %	Votes %	Votes	+/−
Conservative	39	39			▲1	100.0	64.7	48,016	+1.0
Labour	39	0			▼1	0.0	25.4	18,827	–3.1
Alliance	14	0			Steady	0.0	9.5	7,043	+1.7
Independent	1	0			Steady	0.0	0.4	299	N/A
