= 2018 Castle Point Borough Council election =

2018 UK local government election

The 2018 Castle Point Borough Council election took place on 3 May 2018 to elect members of Castle Point Borough Council in England.

== Results summary ==
2018 Castle Point Borough Council election
Party	This election			Full council			This election		
Party	Seats	Net	Seats %	Other	Total	Total %	Votes	Votes %	+/−
Conservative	9	▲5		17	26		10,414	51.1	
CIIP	5	Steady		9	14		4,518	22.2	
Labour	0	Steady		0	0		4,075	20.0	
UKIP	0	▼5		0	0		881	4.3	
Independent	0	Steady		0	0		259	1.3	
Liberal Democrats	0	Steady		0	0		246	1.2	

== Ward results ==
Results from all wards are listed below:

=== Appleton ===
Appleton
Party	Candidate	Votes	%	±%
Conservative	Wayne Johnson	1,055	64.4	+15.1
Labour	Freddy West	345	21.1	+4.0
UKIP	Alan Bayley	237	14.5	−19.0
Majority				
Turnout		1,637		
Conservative gain from UKIP		Swing		

=== Boyce ===
Boyce
Party	Candidate	Votes	%	±%
Conservative	Norman Smith	1,241	72.7	+25.0
Labour	Gwyn Bailey	307	18.0	+1.6
UKIP	Linda Bayley	159	9.3	−26.6
Majority				
Turnout				
Conservative hold		Swing		

=== Canvey Island Central ===
Canvey Island Central
Party	Candidate	Votes	%	±%
CIIP	Peter May	790	61.0	+14.8
Conservative	Jessica Terry	287	15.3	+6.8
Labour	Abbie Young	219	16.9	+7.7
Majority				
Turnout		1,296		
CIIP hold		Swing		

No UKIP (-28.0) or Liberal Democrat (-1.4) candidates as previous.

=== Canvey Island East ===
Canvey Island East
Party	Candidate	Votes	%	±%
CIIP	Alan Acott	756	55.3	+18.3
Conservative	Susan Richardson	466	34.1	+15.2
Labour	Maggie McArthur-Curtis	144	10.5	+1.2
Majority				
Turnout		1,366		
CIIP hold		Swing		

No UKIP candidate as previous (-34.9).

=== Canvey Island North ===
Canvey Island North
Party	Candidate	Votes	%	±%
CIIP	Nick Harvey	975	67.3	+30.8
Conservative	James Cutler	345	23.8	+3.6
Labour	Jackie Reilly	128	8.8	−0.8
Majority				
Turnout		1,448		
CIIP hold		Swing		

No UKIP candidate as previous (-33.7).

=== Canvey Island South ===
Canvey Island South
Party	Candidate	Votes	%	±%
CIIP	Barry Palmer	890	62.9	+12.0
Conservative	Barry Graves	396	28.0	+17.4
Labour	Elizabeth Anderson	130	9.2	+4.1
Majority				
Turnout		1,416		
CIIP hold		Swing		

No UKIP candidate as previous (-26.6).

=== Canvey Island West ===
Canvey Island West
Party	Candidate	Votes	%	±%
Conservative	Jay Blissett	445	42.5	−8.1
CIIP	Jane King	444	42.4	+4.8
Labour	Kieran Smith	158	15.1	+3.3
Majority				
Turnout		1,047		
Conservative hold		Swing		

=== Canvey Island Winter Gardens ===
Canvey Island Winter Gardens
Party	Candidate	Votes	%	±%
CIIP	Peter Greig	663	56.1	+10.0
Conservative	Reg Dover	317	26.8	+8.9
Labour	Mark Maguire	201	17.0	+4.7
Majority				
Turnout		1,181		
CIIP hold		Swing		

=== Cedar Hall ===
Cedar Hall
Party	Candidate	Votes	%	±%
Conservative	Pat Haunts	987	64.5	+16.2
Labour	Brendan Duffield	367	24.0	+5.8
UKIP	John Hudson	177	11.6	−21.9
Majority				
Turnout		1,531		
Conservative gain from UKIP		Swing		

=== St. George's ===
St. George's
Party	Candidate	Votes	%	±%
Conservative	Brian Wood	739	52.8	+10.5
Labour	Joe Cooke	480	34.3	+6.6
UKIP	Brian Lee	181	12.9	−17.1
Majority				
Turnout		1,400		
Conservative gain from UKIP		Swing		

=== St. James' ===
St. James'
Party	Candidate	Votes	%	±%
Conservative	Godfrey Isaacs	1,112	64.8	+16.0
Labour	Leah Rowe	358	20.9	+7.3
Liberal Democrats	Henry Prankerd	246	14.3	+3.1
Majority				
Turnout		1,716		
Conservative hold		Swing		

No UKIP candidate as previous (-26.5).

=== St. Mary's ===
St. Mary's
Party	Candidate	Votes	%	±%
Conservative	Andrew Sheldon	1,035	62.8	+23.2
Labour	Ian Maddison	486	29.5	+3.6
UKIP	Sam Aubrey	127	7.7	−26.8
Majority				
Turnout		1,648		
Conservative hold		Swing		

=== St. Peter's ===
St. Peter's
Party	Candidate	Votes	%	±%
Conservative	Nikki Drogman	914	61.6	+14.3
Labour	Christine Shaw	311	21.0	+7.4
Independent	Ron Hurrell	259	17.5	New
Majority				
Turnout		1,484		
Conservative gain from UKIP		Swing		

=== Victoria ===
Victoria
Party	Candidate	Votes	%	±%
Conservative	Paul Varker	1,075	70.9	+15.9
Labour	Tom Harrison	441	29.1	+11.1
Majority				
Turnout		1,516		
Conservative gain from UKIP		Swing		

No UKIP candidate as previous (-27.0).
