= 1983 Castle Point District Council election =

1983 English local government election

- 5 May 1983

All 39 seats to Castle Point District Council 20 seats needed for a majority

	First party	Second party
Party	Conservative	Labour
Seats won	38	1
Seat change	Steady	Steady
Popular vote	42,223	18,864
Percentage	63.7%	28.5%
Swing	▼8.6%	▲4.3%
Council control before election
Conservative
Council control after election
Conservative

The 1983 Castle Point District Council election took place on 5 May 1983 to elect members of Castle Point District Council in Essex, England. This was on the same day as other local elections.

== Summary ==
=== Election result ===
1983 Castle Point District Council election
Party	Candidates	Seats	Gains	Losses	Net gain/loss	Seats %	Votes %	Votes	+/−
Conservative	39	38			Steady	97.4	63.7	42,223	–8.6
Labour	39	1			Steady	2.6	28.5	18,864	+4.3
Alliance	14	0			Steady	0.0	7.8	5,155	+5.2
