= 2007 Castle Point Borough Council election =

2007 UK local government election

Map of the results of the 2007 Castle Point Borough Council election. Conservative in blue and Canvey Island Independent Party in light grey.

The 2007 Castle Point Borough Council election took place on 3 May 2007 to elect members of Castle Point Borough Council in Essex, England. One third of the council was up for election and the Conservative Party stayed in overall control of the council.

After the election, the composition of the council was:

- Conservative 26
- Canvey Island Independent Party 15

== Election result ==
The Conservatives remained in control of the council with 26 councillors, but lost 3 seats to the Canvey Island Independent Party. The Conservatives held all 8 seats in Benfleet, Hadleigh and Thundersley, but won only 1 of the 6 seats on Canvey Island. On Canvey Island the Canvey Island Independent Party took the other 5 seats to have 15 councillors, gaining 3 from the Conservatives, as well as defeating the only Labour councillor on the council.

Castle Point local election result 2007
Party	Seats	Gains	Losses	Net gain/loss	Seats %	Votes %	Votes	+/−
Conservative	9	0	3	-3	64.3	55.8	12,428	+5.7
CIIP	5	4	0	+4	35.7	20.8	4,637	+1.5
Labour	0	0	1	-1	0.0	18.1	4,035	-3.8
Green	0	0	0	0	0.0	3.8	852	-2.9
UKIP	0	0	0	0	0.0	1.4	309	+1.4

== Ward results ==
Appleton
Party	Candidate	Votes	%	±%
Conservative	Eoin Egan	1,189	71.8	+6.5
Labour	Lorna Trollope	468	28.2	−6.5
Majority		721	43.5	+12.9
Turnout		1,657	31.9	
Conservative hold		Swing		

Boyce
Party	Candidate	Votes	%	±%
Conservative	Wendy Goodwin	1,285	69.8	+6.4
UKIP	Ron Hurrell	309	16.8	+16.8
Labour	Tony Wright	248	13.5	−6.6
Majority		976	53.0	+9.7
Turnout		1,842	35.9	
Conservative hold		Swing		

Canvey Island Central
Party	Candidate	Votes	%	±%
CIIP	Dave Blackwell	958	58.3	+6.3
Conservative	Carol Day	466	28.4	−1.1
Labour	Bill Deal	179	10.9	−4.4
Green	Irene Willis	40	2.4	−0.8
Majority		492	29.9	+7.4
Turnout		1,643	32.2	
CIIP hold		Swing		

Canvey Island East
Party	Candidate	Votes	%	±%
CIIP	Lee Barrett	833	48.8	+4.7
Conservative	Geoff Coates	630	36.9	+6.2
Labour	Jackie Reilly	245	14.3	−7.0
Majority		203	11.9	−1.5
Turnout		1,708	33.9	
CIIP gain from Conservative		Swing		

Canvey Island North
Party	Candidate	Votes	%	±%
CIIP	Grace Watson	878	51.7	+1.6
Conservative	Pat Haunts	493	29.0	+3.8
Labour	Mark Reilly	289	17.0	−4.4
Green	Miles Willis	38	2.2	−1.1
Majority		385	22.7	−2.2
Turnout		1,698	32.1	
CIIP gain from Labour		Swing		

Canvey Island South
Party	Candidate	Votes	%	±%
CIIP	Natalie Darby	822	49.7	+5.1
Conservative	Mark Howard	613	37.0	+4.4
Labour	Daniel Curtis	179	10.8	−8.9
Green	Christopher Keene	41	2.5	−0.6
Majority		209	12.6	+0.5
Turnout		1,655	32.6	
CIIP gain from Conservative		Swing		

Canvey Island West
Party	Candidate	Votes	%	±%
Conservative	Ray Howard	772	60.7	+17.2
CIIP	Rod Cowley	405	31.9	−9.4
Labour	John Payne	94	7.4	−4.8
Majority		367	28.9	+26.7
Turnout		1,271	34.5	
Conservative hold		Swing		

Canvey Island Winter Gardens
Party	Candidate	Votes	%	±%
CIIP	Neville Watson	741	56.2	+7.3
Conservative	Norman Bambridge	417	31.6	+1.0
Labour	Curtis McArthur	161	12.2	−1.5
Majority		324	24.6	+6.3
Turnout		1,319	25.8	
CIIP gain from Conservative		Swing		

Cedar Hall
Party	Candidate	Votes	%	±%
Conservative	Peter Burch	1,057	72.1	+5.9
Labour	Harry Brett	409	27.9	−5.9
Majority		648	44.2	+11.9
Turnout		1,466	32.0	
Conservative hold		Swing		

St George's
Party	Candidate	Votes	%	±%
Conservative	Jackie Govier	920	67.9	+13.9
Labour	Joe Cooke	434	32.1	−1.5
Majority		486	35.9	+15.5
Turnout		1,354	29.5	
Conservative hold		Swing		

St James'
Party	Candidate	Votes	%	±%
Conservative	Norman Ladzrie	1,269	69.6	+0.1
Green	Nanine Pachy	294	16.1	−4.0
Labour	Fred Jones	261	14.3	+3.8
Majority		975	53.5	+4.1
Turnout		1,824	35.4	
Conservative hold		Swing		

St Mary's
Party	Candidate	Votes	%	±%
Conservative	Kate Meager	1,129	68.3	+13.9
Labour	Brian Wilson	524	31.7	+0.1
Majority		605	36.6	+13.9
Turnout		1,653	33.8	
Conservative hold		Swing		

St Peter's
Party	Candidate	Votes	%	±%
Conservative	Bill Dick	1,026	68.4	+3.2
Labour	John Trollope	269	17.9	−1.3
Green	Eileen Peck	204	13.6	−0.6
Majority		757	50.5	+4.5
Turnout		1,499	29.7	
Conservative hold		Swing		

Victoria
Party	Candidate	Votes	%	±%
Conservative	Colin Riley	1,162	69.5	+4.4
Labour	Bob Peters	275	16.4	−1.3
Green	Douglas Copping	235	14.1	−3.1
Majority		887	53.1	+5.7
Turnout		1,672	35.9	
Conservative hold		Swing		

== By-elections between 2007 and 2008 ==
Two by-elections were held in St Marys ward on 20 December 2007 after the resignation of Conservative councillors Alan and Kate Meager. One seat was held for the Conservatives by Alf Partridge with 509 votes, while the other seat was gained for Labour by Brian Wilson with 480 votes.

St Marys by-election 20 December 2007 (2 seats)
Party	Candidate	Votes	%	±%
Conservative	Alf Partridge	509		
Labour	Brian Wilson	480		
Conservative	Mark Howard	461		
Labour	Tony Wright	456		
BNP	John Barber	253		
BNP	John Morgan	234		
Turnout		2,393	24.8	−9.0
Conservative hold		Swing		
Labour gain from Conservative		Swing		
