= 2021 Castle Point Borough Council election =

2021 UK local government election

Map showing the results of the 2021 Castle Point Borough Council election

The 2021 Castle Point Borough Council election took place on 6 May 2021 to elect members of Castle Point Borough Council in England.

== Results summary ==
2021 Castle Point Borough Council election
Party	This election			Full council			This election		
Party	Seats	Net	Seats %	Other	Total	Total %	Votes	Votes %	+/−
Conservative	7	▼3	46.7	14	21	51.2	10,990	42.7	-2.1
CIIP	5	Steady	33.3	11	16	48.0	3,709	14.4	-9.7
Independent	3	▲3	20.0	1	4	9.8	6,971	27.1	+18.3
Labour	0	Steady	0.0	0	0	0.0	3,513	13.6	-3.8
Liberal Democrats	0	Steady	0.0	0	0	0.0	426	1.7	-0.1
Green	0	Steady	0.0	0	0	0.0	116	0.5	New
Reform UK	0	Steady	0.0	0	0	0.0	38	0.1	New

== Ward results ==
=== Appleton ===
Appleton
Party	Candidate	Votes	%	±%
Conservative	Tom Skipp	1,011	53.2	+0.9
Independent	Lynsey MacCarthy-Calvert	635	33.4	+1.4
Labour	Toni Rocha	254	13.4	−2.3
Majority		376	19.8	−0.5
Turnout		1,900		
Conservative hold		Swing	▼0.3	

=== Boyce ===
Boyce
Party	Candidate	Votes	%	±%
Conservative	Andrew Thornton	956	45.2	−2.7
Independent	Robert Baillie	895	42.3	+24.8
Labour	Terry Miller	196	9.3	−25.3
Liberal Democrats	Ellis Swindell	67	3.2	N/A
Majority		61	2.9	−10.4
Turnout		2,114		
Conservative hold		Swing	▼13.8	

=== Boyce (by-election) ===
Boyce (by-election)
Party	Candidate	Votes	%	±%
Conservative	Jack Fortt	979	48.0	+0.1
Independent	Allan Edwards	654	32.0	N/A
Labour	Brian Wilson	219	10.7	−23.9
Independent	Christopher Roberts	189	9.3	N/A
Majority		325	16.0	+2.7
Turnout		2,041		
Conservative hold		Swing	▼16.0	

=== Canvey Island Central ===
Canvey Island Central
Party	Candidate	Votes	%	±%
CIIP	John Anderson	840	63.6	−7.6
Conservative	Jeffrey Stanley	327	24.8	+6.7
Labour	Kieran Smith	153	11.6	+1.0
Majority		513	38.8	−14.3
Turnout		1,320		
CIIP hold		Swing	▼7.2	

=== Canvey Island East ===
Canvey Island East
Party	Candidate	Votes	%	±%
CIIP	Carole Sach	677	49.0	−15.9
Conservative	Owen Cartey	577	41.8	+14.3
Labour	Jacqueline Reilly	128	9.3	+1.7
Majority		100	7.2	−30.2
Turnout		1,382		
CIIP hold		Swing	▼15.1	

=== Canvey Island North ===
Canvey Island North
Party	Candidate	Votes	%	±%
CIIP	John Payne	863	55.5	−16.4
Conservative	Adrian Roper	501	32.2	+12.7
Labour	Margaret McArthur-Curtis	191	12.3	+3.7
Majority		362	23.3	−29.1
Turnout		1,555		
CIIP hold		Swing	▼14.6	

=== Canvey Island South ===
Canvey Island South
Party	Candidate	Votes	%	±%
CIIP	Barry Campagna	864	55.9	+16.2
Conservative	Scott Griffin	502	32.5	+16.3
Labour	Elizabeth Anderson	116	7.5	+2.9
Reform UK	Jamie Huntman	38	2.5	N/A
Liberal Democrats	Richard Bannister	25	1.6	N/A
Majority		362	22.4	+21.9
Turnout		1,545		
CIIP hold		Swing	▼0.1	

=== Canvey Island Winter Gardens ===
Canvey Island Winter Gardens
Party	Candidate	Votes	%	±%
CIIP	Allan Taylor	465	37.8	−29.3
Conservative	John Stone	340	27.7	+7.5
Independent	Raymond Savill	273	22.2	N/A
Labour	David Manclark	151	12.3	−0.4
Majority		125	10.1	−36.8
Turnout		1,229		
CIIP hold		Swing	▼18.4	

=== Cedar Hall ===
Cedar Hall
Party	Candidate	Votes	%	±%
Independent	Stephen Mountford	905	48.6	N/A
Conservative	Michael Dixon	741	39.8	−36.5
Labour	Moreblessing Chasiya	177	9.5	−14.2
Liberal Democrats	Charlotte Negus	41	2.2	N/A
Majority		164	8.8	
Turnout		1,864		
Independent gain from Conservative		Swing	▲42.3	

=== St. George's ===
St. George's
Party	Candidate	Votes	%	±%
Conservative	Clive Walter	676	43.2	−23.9
Independent	Michael Dearson	457	29.2	N/A
Labour	Rosalind Dunhill	315	20.1	−12.8
Green	Billy Brew	116	7.4	N/A
Majority		219	14.0	−20.2
Turnout		1.564		
Conservative hold		Swing	▼26.6	

=== St. George's (by-election) ===
St. George's (by-election)
Party	Candidate	Votes	%	±%
Conservative	Susan Mumford	952	63.0	−3.1
Labour	Katie Curtis	535	36.0	+3.1
Majority		417	27.0	−7.2
Turnout		1,487		
Conservative hold		Swing	▼3.1	

=== St. James ===
St. James
Party	Candidate	Votes	%	±%
Conservative	Simon Hart	1,098	54.5	+14.7
Independent	Sharon Ainsley	483	24.0	N/A
Labour	Gwyneth Bailey	298	14.8	+2.4
Liberal Democrats	Miles Hopkins	134	6.7	−5.5
Majority		615	30.5	+9.4
Turnout		2,013		
Conservative hold		Swing	▼4.7	

=== St. Mary's ===
St. Mary's
Party	Candidate	Votes	%	±%
Independent	Russell Savage	816	42.3	N/A
Conservative	Roxanne Goldfinch	766	39.7	−32.1
Labour	Laurence Chapman	348	18.0	−10.2
Majority		50	2.6	
Turnout		1,930		
Independent gain from Conservative		Swing	▲37.2	

=== St. Peter's ===
St. Peter's
Party	Candidate	Votes	%	±%
Conservative	Beverley Egan	829	44.9	−30.3
Independent	John Woodley	742	40.2	N/A
Labour	William Emberson	209	11.3	−13.5
Liberal Democrats	Geoffrey Duff	67	3.6	N/A
Majority		87	4.7	−45.7
Turnout		1,847		
Conservative hold		Swing	▼35.3	

=== Victoria ===
Victoria
Party	Candidate	Votes	%	±%
Independent	Warren Gibson	922	46.8	N/A
Conservative	Sean Quartermaine	735	37.3	−16.7
Labour	Thomas Harrison	223	11.3	−7.4
Liberal Democrats	Victoria Hopkins	92	4.7	−3.8
Majority		187	9.5	
Turnout		1,972		
Independent gain from Conservative		Swing	▲31.8	

== By-elections ==
St Peter's: 24 February 2022
Party	Candidate	Votes	%	±%
Conservative	Michael Dixon	502	45.1	+0.2
Independent	John Woodley	439	39.4	−0.8
Labour	Bill Emberson	173	15.5	+4.2
Majority		63	5.7	
Turnout		1,114		
Conservative hold		Swing		
