= 2006 Castle Point Borough Council election =

2006 UK local government election

Map of the results of the 2006 Castle Point Borough Council election. Conservative in blue and Canvey Island Independent Party in light grey.

The 2006 Castle Point Borough Council election took place on 4 May 2006 to elect members of Castle Point Borough Council in Essex, England. One third of the council was up for election and the Conservative Party stayed in overall control of the council.

After the election, the composition of the council was:

- Conservative: 29
- Canvey Island Independent Party: 11
- Labour: 1

== Election result ==
The Conservative Party stayed in control of the council but lost 5 seats on Canvey Island to the Canvey Island Independent Party. The Conservatives won all 8 mainland seats that were contested, while the Canvey Island Independent Party won 5 of the 6 seats on the island.

Castle Point local election result 2006
| Party | Seats | Gains | Losses | Net gain/loss | Seats % | Votes % | Votes | +/− |
|---|---|---|---|---|---|---|---|---|
| Conservative | 9 | 0 | 5 | -5 | 64.3 | 50.1 | 12,121 | +1.3 |
| CIIP | 5 | 5 | 0 | +5 | 35.7 | 19.3 | 4,678 | +2.6 |
| Labour | 0 | 0 | 0 | 0 | 0.0 | 21.9 | 5,300 | -5.2 |
| Green | 0 | 0 | 0 | 0 | 0.0 | 6.7 | 1,634 | +0.4 |
| Liberal Democrats | 0 | 0 | 0 | 0 | 0.0 | 1.9 | 459 | +1.9 |
| PFRC | 0 | 0 | 0 | 0 | 0.0 | 0.1 | 25 | +0.1 |

== Ward results ==
Appleton
| Party | Candidate | Votes | % | ±% |
|---|---|---|---|---|
| Conservative | Pamela Diedre Freeman | 1,179 | 65.3 | +0.7 |
| Labour | Lorna Trollope | 627 | 34.7 | −0.7 |
| Majority | | 552 | 30.6 | +1.5 |
| Turnout | | 1,806 | | |
| Conservative hold | | Swing | | |

Boyce
| Party | Candidate | Votes | % | ±% |
|---|---|---|---|---|
| Conservative | Norman George Smith | 1,202 | 63.4 | −0.5 |
| Labour | Anthony Nicholas Wright | 381 | 20.1 | −2.3 |
| Liberal Democrats | Barry Alvin Newman | 314 | 16.6 | +16.6 |
| Majority | | 821 | 43.3 | +1.8 |
| Turnout | | 1,897 | | |
| Conservative hold | | Swing | | |

Canvey Island Central
| Party | Candidate | Votes | % | ±% |
|---|---|---|---|---|
| CIIP | Peter May | 907 | 52.0 | +7.8 |
| Conservative | Jane Elizabeth King | 514 | 29.5 | +2.9 |
| Labour | Margaret Curtis-McArther | 267 | 15.3 | −11.5 |
| Green | Clifford Hughes | 55 | 3.2 | +0.8 |
| Majority | | 393 | 22.5 | +5.1 |
| Turnout | | 1,743 | | |
| CIIP gain from Conservative | | Swing | | |

Canvey Island East
| Party | Candidate | Votes | % | ±% |
|---|---|---|---|---|
| CIIP | Philip George Davies | 772 | 44.1 | −1.6 |
| Conservative | Shirley Grace Coates | 537 | 30.7 | +3.2 |
| Labour | Jacqueline Constance Reilly | 373 | 21.3 | − −2.9 |
| Green | Irene Lilian Willis | 67 | 3.8 | +3.8 |
| Majority | | 235 | 13.4 | −4.8 |
| Turnout | | 1,749 | | |
| CIIP gain from Conservative | | Swing | | |

Canvey Island North
| Party | Candidate | Votes | % | ±% |
|---|---|---|---|---|
| CIIP | Nigel Harvey | 911 | 50.1 | +2.5 |
| Conservative | Patricia Haunts | 458 | 25.2 | +2.4 |
| Labour | Derek Stephen Kennedy | 388 | 21.4 | −4.3 |
| Green | Christopher Richard Keene | 60 | 3.3 | −0.6 |
| Majority | | 453 | 24.9 | +3.0 |
| Turnout | | 1,817 | | |
| CIIP gain from Conservative | | Swing | | |

Canvey Island South
| Party | Candidate | Votes | % | ±% |
|---|---|---|---|---|
| CIIP | Joan Liddiard | 855 | 44.6 | +2.7 |
| Conservative | Sylvia Ann Waymark | 624 | 32.6 | +0.1 |
| Labour | Daniel Alan Curtis | 378 | 19.7 | +5.8 |
| Green | Miles Gordon Willis | 59 | 3.1 | +0.4 |
| Majority | | 231 | 12.1 | +2.7 |
| Turnout | | 1,916 | | |
| CIIP gain from Conservative | | Swing | | |

Canvey Island West
| Party | Candidate | Votes | % | ±% |
|---|---|---|---|---|
| Conservative | Anthony William Belford | 574 | 43.5 | |
| CIIP | Christine Kathleen Andrews | 545 | 41.3 | |
| Labour | William Albert Deal | 161 | 12.2 | |
| Green | Korinna Jayne Willis | 41 | 3.1 | |
| Majority | | 29 | 2.2 | |
| Turnout | | 1,321 | | |
| Conservative hold | | Swing | | |

Canvey Island Winter Gardens
| Party | Candidate | Votes | % | ±% |
|---|---|---|---|---|
| CIIP | Peter Charles Greig | 688 | 48.9 | +3.4 |
| Conservative | Dorothy Florence Alice Best | 431 | 30.6 | −2.9 |
| Labour | John Payne | 193 | 13.7 | −4.1 |
| Green | Grant Fryatt | 96 | 6.8 | +6.8 |
| Majority | | 257 | 18.3 | +6.2 |
| Turnout | | 1,408 | | |
| CIIP gain from Conservative | | Swing | | |

Cedar Hall
| Party | Candidate | Votes | % | ±% |
|---|---|---|---|---|
| Conservative | Alexis Maryse Iles | 1,070 | 66.2 | −1.6 |
| Labour | Kevin Blanking | 547 | 33.8 | +1.6 |
| Majority | | 523 | 32.3 | −3.3 |
| Turnout | | 1,617 | | |
| Conservative hold | | Swing | | |

St George's
| Party | Candidate | Votes | % | ±% |
|---|---|---|---|---|
| Conservative | Andrew Robin Cole | 859 | 54.0 | −6.5 |
| Labour | Joseph Patrick Cooke | 535 | 33.6 | −5.9 |
| Green | Peggy Jane Smith | 196 | 12.3 | +12.3 |
| Majority | | 324 | 20.4 | −0.6 |
| Turnout | | 1,590 | | |
| Conservative hold | | Swing | | |

St James'
| Party | Candidate | Votes | % | ±% |
|---|---|---|---|---|
| Conservative | Godfrey Ian Isaacs | 1,327 | 69.5 | +11.6 |
| Green | Nanine Pachy | 383 | 20.1 | −1.7 |
| Labour | Frederick Jones | 200 | 10.5 | −9.8 |
| Majority | | 944 | 49.4 | +13.3 |
| Turnout | | 1,910 | | |
| Conservative hold | | Swing | | |

St Mary's
| Party | Candidate | Votes | % | ±% |
|---|---|---|---|---|
| Conservative | Alan John Meager | 1,014 | 54.4 | +1.7 |
| Labour | Brian Wilson | 590 | 31.6 | −15.7 |
| Liberal Democrats | Thomas Edward Newman | 145 | 7.8 | +7.8 |
| Green | Lesley Morgan | 116 | 6.2 | +6.2 |
| Majority | | 424 | 22.7 | +17.2 |
| Turnout | | 1,865 | | |
| Conservative hold | | Swing | | |

St Peter's
| Party | Candidate | Votes | % | ±% |
|---|---|---|---|---|
| Conservative | Pamela Anne Challis | 1,171 | 65.2 | +4.8 |
| Labour | John Gyffard Trollope | 345 | 19.2 | −4.4 |
| Green | Eileen Elizabeth Peck | 254 | 14.2 | −1.8 |
| PFRC | Anton Hoenderkamp | 25 | 1.4 | +1.4 |
| Majority | | 826 | 46.0 | +9.2 |
| Turnout | | 1,795 | | |
| Conservative hold | | Swing | | |

Victoria
| Party | Candidate | Votes | % | ±% |
|---|---|---|---|---|
| Conservative | Clifford Nigel Brunt | 1,161 | 65.1 | +6.1 |
| Labour | Harry Anthony Brett | 315 | 17.7 | −4.9 |
| Green | Douglas John Copping | 307 | 17.2 | −1.3 |
| Majority | | 846 | 47.4 | +11.0 |
| Turnout | | 1,783 | | |
| Conservative hold | | Swing | | |
