= 2008 Castle Point Borough Council election =

2008 UK local government election

Map of the results of the 2008 Castle Point Borough Council election. Conservative in blue and Canvey Island Independent Party in light grey. Wards in dark grey were not contested in 2008.

The 2008 Castle Point Borough Council election took place on 1 May 2008 to elect members of Castle Point Borough Council in Essex, England. One third of the council was up for election and the Conservative Party stayed in overall control of the council.

After the election, the composition of the council was:

- Conservative 25
- Canvey Island Independent Party 15
- Labour 1

== Background ==
14 seats were contested at the election with no election in Canvey West ward, but with a by-election being held in Canvey South at the same time as the normal election in the ward, after the Canvey Island Independent Party councillor Natalie Derby had stepped down in March 2008 due to ill health. One councillor stood down at the election, Conservative Elizabeth Govier from St Georges ward.

Not counting the extra by-election in Canvey South, there were 13 candidates each from the Conservative and Labour parties, 5 from the Canvey Island Independent Party, 3 each from the British National Party and the Green Party and 1 from the UK Independence Party.

== Election result ==
The Conservatives remained in control of the council after winning the seats in Benfleet, Hadleigh and Thundersley, while the Canvey Island Independent Party won all 6 seats on Canvey Island. No other party won any seats at the election, with Labour finishing behind the British National Party in 2 wards and behind the UK Independence Party in 1 ward. Overall turnout at the election was 33.0%.

Castle Point local election result 2008
Party	Seats	Gains	Losses	Net gain/loss	Seats %	Votes %	Votes	+/−
Conservative	8	0	0	0	57.1	52.2	12,075	-3.6
CIIP	6	0	0	0	42.9	23.0	5,314	+2.2
Labour	0	0	0	0	0.0	16.1	3,733	-2.0
BNP	0	0	0	0	0.0	3.6	839	+3.6
Green	0	0	0	0	0.0	3.1	722	-0.7
UKIP	0	0	0	0	0.0	1.9	441	+0.5

== Ward results ==
Appleton
Party	Candidate	Votes	%	±%
Conservative	Tom Skipp	1,262	73.2	+1.4
Labour	John Trollope	462	26.8	−1.4
Majority		800	46.4	+2.9
Turnout		1,724		
Conservative hold		Swing		

Boyce
Party	Candidate	Votes	%	±%
Conservative	Jeffrey Stanley	1,215	63.8	−6.0
UKIP	Ron Hurrell	441	23.1	+6.3
Labour	Harry Brett	249	13.1	−0.4
Majority		774	40.6	−12.4
Turnout		1,905		
Conservative hold		Swing		

Canvey Island Central
Party	Candidate	Votes	%	±%
CIIP	John Anderson	905	60.3	+2.0
Conservative	Dorothy Best	433	28.8	+0.4
Labour	Bill Deal	164	10.9	+0.0
Majority		472	31.4	+1.5
Turnout		1,502		
CIIP hold		Swing		

Canvey Island East
Party	Candidate	Votes	%	±%
CIIP	Anne Wood	962	59.2	+10.4
Conservative	Colin Maclean	508	31.3	−5.3
Labour	Katie Curtis	155	9.5	−4.8
Majority		454	27.9	+16.0
Turnout		1,625		
CIIP hold		Swing		

Canvey Island North
Party	Candidate	Votes	%	±%
CIIP	Martin Tucker	947	51.7	+0.0
Conservative	Carole Cross	363	19.8	−9.2
BNP	John Morgan	338	18.5	+18.5
Labour	Jacqueline Reilly	183	10.0	−7.0
Majority		584	31.9	+9.2
Turnout		1,831		
CIIP hold		Swing		

Canvey Island South
Party	Candidate	Votes	%	±%
CIIP	Brian Wood	767	45.0	−4.7
Conservative	Mark Howard	549	32.2	−4.8
BNP	Peter Barber	257	15.1	+15.1
Labour	Michael Curham	130	7.6	−3.2
Majority		218	12.8	+0.2
Turnout		1,703		
CIIP hold		Swing		

Canvey Island South by-election
Party	Candidate	Votes	%	±%
CIIP	Janice Payne	930	55.6	+5.9
Conservative	Margaret Belford	596	35.6	−1.4
Labour	John Payne	146	8.7	−2.1
Majority		334	20.0	+7.4
Turnout		1,672		
CIIP hold		Swing		

Canvey Island Winter Gardens
Party	Candidate	Votes	%	±%
CIIP	Barry Dixie	803	59.4	+3.2
Conservative	Pat Haunts	422	31.2	−0.4
Labour	Margaret McArthur-Curtis	127	9.4	−2.8
Majority		381	28.2	+3.6
Turnout		1,352		
CIIP hold		Swing		

Cedar Hill
Party	Candidate	Votes	%	±%
Conservative	Liz Wass	1,106	75.8	+3.7
Labour	Lorna Trollope	353	24.2	−3.7
Majority		753	51.6	+7.4
Turnout		1,459		
Conservative hold		Swing		

St George's
Party	Candidate	Votes	%	±%
Conservative	Clive Walter	1,049	69.1	+1.2
Labour	Joe Cooke	469	30.9	−1.2
Majority		580	38.2	+2.3
Turnout		1,518		
Conservative hold		Swing		

St James
Party	Candidate	Votes	%	±%
Conservative	Bill Sharp	1,329	71.2	+1.6
Labour	Fred Jones	271	14.5	+0.2
Green	Narine Pachy	266	14.3	−1.8
Majority		1,058	56.7	+3.2
Turnout		1,866		
Conservative hold		Swing		

St Mary's
Party	Candidate	Votes	%	±%
Conservative	David Cross	963	55.6	−12.7
Labour	Anthony Wright	526	30.4	−1.2
BNP	Scott Smith	244	14.1	+14.1
Majority		437	25.2	−11.4
Turnout		1,733		
Conservative hold		Swing		

St Peter's
Party	Candidate	Votes	%	±%
Conservative	Beverley Egan	1,099	69.7	+1.3
Labour	William Emberson	275	17.4	−0.5
Green	Eileen Peck	203	12.9	−0.7
Majority		824	52.3	+1.8
Turnout		1,577		
Conservative hold		Swing		

Victoria
Party	Candidate	Votes	%	±%
Conservative	Enid Isaacs	1,181	71.3	+1.8
Green	Lesley Morgan	253	15.3	+1.2
Labour	Alan Curtis	223	13.5	−2.9
Majority		928	56.0	+2.9
Turnout		1,657		
Conservative hold		Swing		
