= 1979 Castle Point District Council election =

1979 English local government election

- 3 May 1979

All 39 seats to Castle Point District Council 20 seats needed for a majority

	First party	Second party
Party	Conservative	Labour
Seats won	38	1
Seat change	▲2	▼2
Popular vote	77,493	25,881
Percentage	72.3%	24.2%
Swing	▲5.1%	▼2.0%
Council control before election
Conservative
Council control after election
Conservative

The 1979 Castle Point District Council election took place on 3 May 1979 to elect members of Castle Point District Council in Essex, England. This was on the same day as the 1979 general election and other local elections.

== Summary ==
=== Election result ===
1979 Castle Point District Council election
Party	Candidates	Seats	Gains	Losses	Net gain/loss	Seats %	Votes %	Votes	+/−
Conservative	39	38			▲2	97.4	72.3	77,493	+5.1
Labour	25	1			▼2	2.6	24.2	25,881	–2.0
Liberal	3	0			Steady	0.0	2.6	2,773	–2.3
Independent	1	0			Steady	0.0	0.9	963	N/A
