= 2011 Castle Point Borough Council election =

2011 UK local government election

Map of the results of the 2011 Castle Point Borough Council election. Conservative in blue and Canvey Island Independent Party in light grey.

The 2011 Castle Point Borough Council election took place on 5 May 2011 to elect members of Castle Point Borough Council in Essex, England. One third of the council was up for election and the Conservative Party stayed in overall control of the council.

After the election, the composition of the council was

- Conservative 25
- Canvey Island Independent Party 16

== Election result ==
No seats changed hands at the election, with every councillor standing again being re-elected.

Castle Point local election result 2011
Party	Seats	Gains	Losses	Net gain/loss	Seats %	Votes %	Votes	+/−
Conservative	9	0	0	0	64.3	53.1	13,570	+9.4
CIIP	5	0	0	0	35.7	21.8	5,577	+1.8
Labour	0	0	0	0	0.0	21.9	5,609	+5.4
Green	0	0	0	0	0.0	3.1	801	+3.1

== Ward results ==
Appleton
Party	Candidate	Votes	%	±%
Conservative	Eoin Egan	1,346	65.6	+19.7
Labour	Lorna Trollope	707	34.4	+14.5
Majority		639	31.1	+19.5
Turnout		2,053		
Conservative hold		Swing		

Boyce
Party	Candidate	Votes	%	±%
Conservative	Wendy Goodwin	1,651	76.2	+20.0
Labour	Tony Wright	517	23.8	+11.1
Majority		1,134	52.3	+27.3
Turnout		2,168		
Conservative hold		Swing		

Canvey Island Central
Party	Candidate	Votes	%	±%
CIIP	Dave Blackwell	1,064	63.9	+9.7
Conservative	Stewart Topley	366	22.0	−9.3
Labour	Lynne Michele	235	14.1	−0.4
Majority		698	41.9	+19.0
Turnout		1,665		
CIIP hold		Swing		

Canvey Island East
Party	Candidate	Votes	%	±%
CIIP	Lee Barrett	960	56.2	+4.1
Conservative	Lydia Parkin	509	29.8	−4.7
Labour	Maggie Mcarthur-Curtis	239	14.0	+0.7
Majority		451	26.4	+8.8
Turnout		1,708		
CIIP hold		Swing		

Canvey Island North
Party	Candidate	Votes	%	±%
CIIP	Grace Watson	1,115	58.8	+7.7
Conservative	Pat Haunts	480	25.3	−6.6
Labour	John Payne	301	15.9	−1.2
Majority		635	33.5	+14.3
Turnout		1,896		
CIIP hold		Swing		

Canvey Island South
Party	Candidate	Votes	%	±%
CIIP	Janice Payne	1,003	55.6	+5.4
Conservative	Chas Mumford	600	33.2	−3.6
Labour	Matthew Reilly	202	11.2	−1.8
Majority		403	22.3	+8.9
Turnout		1,805		
CIIP hold		Swing		

Canvey Island West
Party	Candidate	Votes	%	±%
Conservative	Ray Howard	720	49.3	+7.4
CIIP	Steven Cole	623	42.7	−2.5
Labour	Bill Deal	116	8.0	−4.9
Majority		97	6.6	
Turnout		1,459		
Conservative hold		Swing		

Canvey Island Winter Gardens
Party	Candidate	Votes	%	±%
CIIP	Neville Watson	812	54.6	+0.7
Conservative	Mark Howard	463	31.2	−1.9
Labour	Katie Curtis	211	14.2	+1.2
Majority		349	23.5	+2.7
Turnout		1,486		
CIIP hold		Swing		

Cedar Hall
Party	Candidate	Votes	%	±%
Conservative	Peter Burch	901	46.3	−0.2
Independent	Colin Letchford	697	35.8	+35.8
Labour	Richard Kendall	350	18.0	−0.3
Majority		204	10.5	−0.8
Turnout		1,948		
Conservative hold		Swing		

St. George's
Party	Candidate	Votes	%	±%
Conservative	Jackie Govier	1,109	61.8	+14.7
Labour	Joe Cooke	686	38.2	+13.2
Majority		423	23.6	+4.4
Turnout		1,795		
Conservative hold		Swing		

St James'
Party	Candidate	Votes	%	±%
Conservative	Norman Ladzrie	1,547	66.7	+16.0
Labour	Fred Jones	443	19.1	+4.8
Green	Paul Circus	328	14.2	+14.2
Majority		1,104	47.6	+32.0
Turnout		2,318		
Conservative hold		Swing		

St. Mary's
Party	Candidate	Votes	%	±%
Conservative	Alf Partridge	1,275	63.1	+14.4
Labour	Brian Wilson	746	36.9	+14.5
Majority		529	26.2	+6.4
Turnout		2,021		
Conservative hold		Swing		

St Peter's
Party	Candidate	Votes	%	±%
Conservative	Bill Dick	1,288	65.5	+15.1
Labour	Bill Emberson	451	22.9	+6.3
Green	Douglas Copping	228	11.6	+11.6
Majority		837	42.6	+13.6
Turnout		1,967		
Conservative hold		Swing		

Victoria
Party	Candidate	Votes	%	±%
Conservative	Colin Riley	1,315	66.9	+16.7
Labour	Harry Brett	405	20.6	+3.9
Green	Lesley Morgan	245	12.5	+12.5
Majority		910	46.3	+30.2
Turnout		1,965		
Conservative hold		Swing		
