= Kamal Saleem =

Lebanese minister and former terrorist

Kamal Saleem (born 1957) is the pseudonym of a Lebanese-American self-claimed former Muslim terrorist. He is a convert to Christianity and minister who evangelizes to Muslims.

== Biography ==
=== Early life ===
Born in Lebanon, Saleem was taught to wage jihad from a young age for the Palestine Liberation Organization and the Muslim Brotherhood. When he was seven, he was sent by his parents to Muslim training camps to learn to use weapons and engage and kill the enemy. He was also taught another more subtle form of warfare, called "Cultural Jihad", which he was eventually chosen to wage in the United States.

He lived in a small Midwestern town in the early 1980s where he tried to recruit men in poorer neighborhoods to Islam. He then had a serious car crash, which hospitalized him. He subsequently received support from Christians, and after being "overwhelmed with the outpouring of Christian love", he eventually converted to Christianity. It has been uncovered that he worked for the Christian Broadcasting Network from 1987 to 2003, and for Focus on the Family since then.

=== Alleged terrorist activities ===
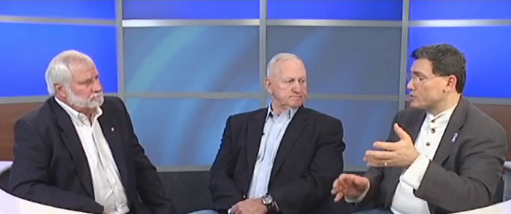
Saleem (right) and his 2014 co-author Jerry Boykin (center) being interviewed by Rick Joyner (left) in 2012

Saleem recounted his story as a terrorist in the book The Blood of Lambs: A Former Terrorist’s Memoir of Death and Redemption in 2009. His claims of being a former terrorist, including an encounter with Yasser Arafat, having helped run a terrorist camp in the Libyan desert under Moammar Qaddafi, visiting Iraq where he rubbed shoulders with Saddam Hussein, and working alongside the mujahideen in Afghanistan, have been questioned in the magazine Mother Jones, Books & Culture, The Daily Beast and The Kansas City Star. Saleem additionally claims that the Muslim Brotherhood has put a $25 million bounty on his head, and alleges that he has been the subject of an assassination attempt. He has been compared to other alleged ex-Muslim terrorist converts to Christianity such as Walid Shoebat, Zachariah Anani, Ergun Caner and Emir Caner, whose stories have also been disputed.

=== Activities after conversion ===
Saleem founded Koome Ministries together with his wife in 2006, and travels across the United States "challenging Muslims to question their allegiance to Allah," and aiming to "teach about what it sees as 'radical Islam's true agenda'." He has appeared on CNN, CBS News, and Fox News, and has spoken on terrorism and radical Islam at Stanford University, the University of California, the Air Force Academy, and other institutions. He has been described as a part of the counter-jihad movement.

== Bibliography ==
- The Blood of Lambs: A Former Terrorist's Memoir of Death and Redemption. Co-authored with Vincent, Lynn. Howard. 2009. ISBN 978-1439159286.
- The Coalition: A Novel. Co-authored with Boykin, Jerry. Post Hill. 2014. ISBN 978-1618689498.
- Ishmael Redeemed: Called to the Kingdom. Primedia eLaunch LLC. 2023. ISBN 979-8889920960.
