= Srđa Trifković =

Serbian-American writer

Srđa Trifković Срђа Трифковић
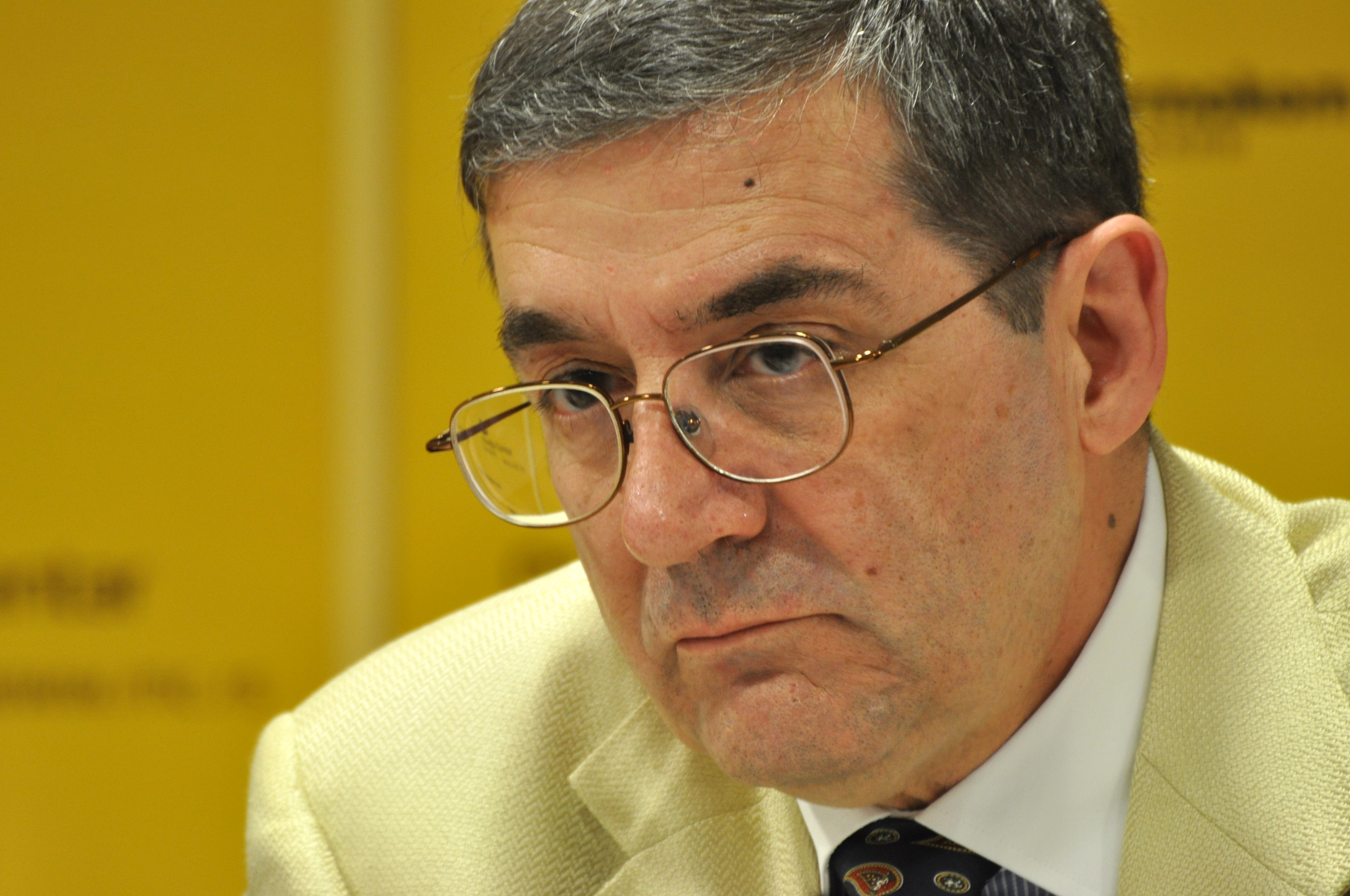
- Trifković in May 2011.
- Born: 19 July 1954 (age 71); Belgrade, PR Serbia, FPR Yugoslavia
- Education: University of Sussex (BA Hon); University of Zagreb (BA); University of Southampton (PhD)
- Occupation: Foreign affairs editor for Chronicles

Srđa Trifković (Serbian Cyrillic: Срђа Трифковић, Serbian pronunciation: [sr̩̂dʑa trîfkɔʋitɕ]; born 19 July 1954) is a Serbian-American publicist, politician and historian. He is currently a foreign affairs editor for the paleoconservative magazine Chronicles, and a politics professor at the University of Banja Luka in Bosnia and Herzegovina.

Trifković is the author of many books, among which is Sword of the Prophet, a book on what Trifković describes as the history, doctrines, and impact of Islam on the world. He comments on Balkan politics and was a columnist for a few think-tank webpages and conservative publications in the United States.

He was an unofficial spokesman for the Republika Srpska government in the 1990s and a former adviser to Serbian president Vojislav Koštunica and Republika Srpska president Biljana Plavšić. He has argued that the accepted interpretation of the Srebrenica genocide is a "myth based on a lie".

== Biography ==
Trifković earned a BA (Hon) in International Relations from the University of Sussex in 1977 and another, in Political Science, from the University of Zagreb in 1987. Since 1990 he has held a PhD in modern history from the University of Southampton, and in 1991-1992 he pursued post-doctoral research on a Title VIII grant from the U.S. Department of State as a visiting scholar at the Hoover Institution in California.

Beginning in 1980, he has been a radio broadcaster for BBC World Service and Voice of America and later a correspondent covering southeast Europe for U.S. News & World Report and the Washington Times during which time he was an editor for the Belgrade magazine Duga. In 1994–95 he acted as an "unofficial spokesman" for the Bosnian Serb government (while preferring to describe himself as a "Balkan affairs analyst with close links to the Bosnian Serbs"). He has published op-eds and commentaries in The Times of London, the San Francisco Chronicle, the American Conservative, the Philadelphia Inquirer, and The Alternative Right. He was interviewed in 1994 by BBC World Service and Sky News. He has contributed to Liberty, the newspaper of the Serbian National Defense Council of America.

He has been an adjunct professor at the University of St Thomas in Houston, Texas (1996–1997), and, in August 1997, joined the faculty of Rose Hill College in Aiken, South Carolina. He has worked as unofficial representative of the Republika Srpska in London.

In February 2000, he testified to the Canadian House of Commons on the situation in the Balkans. In July 2000 he took part in a Congressional briefing organized by Rep. Dennis Kucinich.

In March 2003, he testified as a defense witness for Milomir Stakić at his trial before the International Criminal Tribunal for the Former Yugoslavia. Stakić was later convicted of extermination, murder and persecutions and sentenced to 40 years' imprisonment.

In June 2006, he was one of two dozen people who presented works at a symposium on the Holocaust in Yugoslavia, 1941–1945, co-organized by two Serbian institutions and held at Yad Vashem Center in Jerusalem. In September 2008, he testified as a defense witness for Ljubiša Beara in the Popović et al. trial. Beara was later convicted of genocide, extermination, murder, persecutions and sentenced to life imprisonment.

He is affiliated with the counter-jihad movement, having participated as the keynote speaker at the international counter-jihad conferences in Vienna in 2008 and in Copenhagen in 2009.

Trifković participated and was one of the principal speakers at the conference Preserving Western Civilization, organized by White separatist, Michael H. Hart, held in Baltimore in 2009. It was billed as addressing the need to defend "America's Judeo-Christian heritage and European identity", and included speakers such as Lawrence Auster, Peter Brimelow, Steven Farron, Julia Gorin, Lino A. Graglia, Henry C. Harpending, Roger D. McGrath, Pat Richardson, J. Philippe Rushton, and Brenda Walker.

In February 2011, Canadian authorities refused to allow Trifković entry into Canada to address a meeting at the University of British Columbia at Vancouver. Trifković reported in the journal Chronicles that he was refused entry to Canada on 24 February 2011 on the "transparently spurious" grounds that he was "inadmissible on grounds of violating human or international rights for being a proscribed senior official in the service of a government that, in the opinion of the minister, engages or has engaged in terrorism, systematic or gross human rights violations, or genocide, a war crime or a crime against humanity within the meaning of subsections 6 (3) to (5) of the Crimes Against Humanity and War Crimes Act." He claimed his "inadmissibility" was due to contacts with the Bosnian Serb leaders in the early 1990s but claimed that the Canadian authorities' grounds for refusing him admission were "transparently spurious" and they had in fact yielded to a Bosniak-inspired campaign against him. The Canadian Institute for the Research of Genocide alleged that Trifković was promoting hatred, antisemitism and Islamophobia and accused him of publicly denying massacre of Bosniaks at Srebrenica in July 1995, found by the ICTY to be a crime of genocide.

In August 2011, responding to the claim that his work inspired Norwegian murderer Anders Behring Breivik, Trifković rejected the idea that his work was a basis for the actions of this "mentally deranged narcissistic psychopath" any more than the "Beatles have inspired Charles Manson." These claims were raised in relation to an observations Trifković made on Islam in his books Sword of the Prophet and Defeating Jihad, and in the documentary film "Islam – What the West needs to know", which are cited by Breivik in his manifesto.

In 2013 he testified on behalf of Radovan Karadžić. Trifković denied being a former spokesman for Karadžić at a time he was a journalist and analyst reporting on Karadžić's activities.

== Works ==
- Trifković, Srdjan (December 1993). "Rivalry between Germany and Italy in Croatia, 1942-1943". The Historical Journal. 36 (4). Cambridge University Press: 879–904. doi:10.1017/S0018246X00014540. S2CID 159771416.
- Ustasa: Croatian separatism and European politics, 1929-1945, London (1998); ISBN 1-892478-00-5
- The Sword of the Prophet: The politically incorrect guide to Islam: History, Theology, Impact on the World, Boston, Regina Orthodox Press (2002); ISBN 1-928653-11-1
- Defeating Jihad: How the War on Terrorism May Yet Be Won, In Spite of Ourselves, Regina Orthodox Press (2006); ISBN 978-1928653264
- The Krajina Chronicle: A History of Serbs in Croatia, Slavonia and Dalmatia, The Lord Byron Foundation (2010); ISBN 978-1892478108
- Kontinuitet Hladnog rata: međunarodni odnosi početkom XXI veka, Geopolitika (2017); ISBN 978-86-87871-07-6

== Filmography ==
- The Weight of Chains (documentary interview)
- Islam: What the West Needs to Know
