= Zachariah Anani =

Lebanese militia fighter (1958–2016)

- Born: 25 December 1958; Beirut, Lebanon
- Died: 4 July 2016 (aged 57)

Zachariah Anani (25 December 1958 – 4 July 2016, Arabic: زكريا عناني, also Zack or Zak) was a Lebanese-Canadian former Sunni Muslim citizen of Lebanon who later converted to Christianity and settled in Canada in 1996. He described himself as a former militia fighter.

== Biography ==
Anani was born in Beirut and claimed descent "from a long line of imams" and that he was "expected to become one at the age of 14." Anani says that he became a fighter in a Lebanese militia "at the age of 14."

Anani claimed to have been trained to fight and kill Jews and to hate Christians and Americans. He said his family was pleased with his decision because they believe Islamic teachings promise reaching heaven if he were to die in battle against "unbelievers." Ironically, Anani said that he faced Muslim groups, who fought among themselves usually and Israelis only once.

He was later to meet an American Southern Baptist missionary, who inspired him to convert to Christianity, and later move to Canada. He became a naturalized citizen of Canada and lived in Windsor, Ontario.

Anani had a controversial career as a public speaker on Islam in the 2000s, with critics suggesting his "hardline views" could stoke "anti-Muslim sentiment". His talks such as a 2007 lecture, The Deadly Threat of Islam at Campbell Baptist Church in Windsor attracted criticism. In that lecture, he characterized Islam as a faith that worships a god who "fights and kills," "strikes with terror," and forbids the taking of prisoners in battles against nonbelievers. He was described as a part of the counter-jihad movement.

Anani was one of a number of converts to Christianity who are public critics of Islam, including Ergun Caner, Emir Caner, Walid Shoebat, Kamal Saleem and Mark A. Gabriel, who have been accused of inflating or inventing details of their life before conversion to Christianity. He shared stages with Shoebat and Saleem, who were billed as "the three ex-terrorists".
