= Islam: What the West Needs to Know =

- Front Cover
- Directed by: Gregory M. Davis, Bryan Daly
- Produced by: Gregory M. Davis, Bryan Daly
- Starring: Robert Spencer, Walid Shoebat, Bat Yeor, Serge Trifkovic, Abdullah Al-Araby
- Release dates: January 15, 2006 (American Renaissance Film Festival); July 7, 2006 (United States)
- Running time: 98 minutes
- Country: United States
- Language: English

Islam: What the West Needs to Know is a 2006 propaganda film produced by Quixotic Media. It features discussions using passages from religious texts and includes commentaries by Robert Spencer, Serge Trifkovic, Bat Ye'or, Abdullah Al-Araby, and Walid Shoebat. The film premiered at the American Film Renaissance Festival in Hollywood on January 15, 2006, and had a limited theatrical release in Chicago, Washington, D.C., and Atlanta in summer 2006.

== Critical reception ==
While some reviewers have had a positive reception to the film, others have criticised the film as being inaccurate, simplistic, biased and propagandist against Islam. The Chicago Tribune's reviewer, Michael Phillips, describes it as a "deadly dull anti-Islam propaganda piece". The Washington City Paper's reviewer, Louis Bayard, argues that "If [the directors] Davis and Daly had a little imagination, they might see that the devil they’re chasing isn't Islam but fundamentalism, which assumes many forms." The film has been described as an "anti-Muslim documentary" in the context of the counter-jihad movement.

== See also ==
- Islamophobia
- Criticism of Islam
- Islamic terrorism
