= Prescription =

In general, the word prescriptive refers to normative judgments, i.e. judgments about what is good or bad, such as:

- Prescriptive analytics, third and final phase of business analytics
- Linguistic prescriptivism, the laying down of normative language rules
- Prescriptive (normative) economics, branch of economics that incorporates value judgments
- Prescriptive ethics, as distinct from meta-ethics and descriptive ethics
- Prescriptive mood, a grammatical mood used in some languages

Other uses include:

== Health care ==
- Medical prescription, a plan of care written by a physician or other health care professional
  - Prescription drug, a drug available only if prescribed by a medical prescription
- Eyeglass prescription, written by an ophthalmologist or an optometrist for individuals with eye related concerns

== Law ==
- Customary law, a right enjoyed through long use
- Easement#By prescription, acquisition of private property rights through uncontested use
- Prescription (sovereignty transfer), acquisition of sovereignty through uncontested use
- Statute of limitations#Prescription, in civil law jurisdictions, the time limit within which a lawsuit must be brought
- Prescribed sum, the maximum fine that may be imposed on summary conviction of certain offences in the United Kingdom
- Prescribed senior official, an individual who will be refused admission into Canada because of war crimes or crimes against humanity

== Other uses ==
- Prescriptive barony, a "feudal" barony in Scotland
- Prescriptive notation, a type of Chinese musical notation

== See also ==
- Prescription Act 1832, United Kingdom
- Proscription, word sometimes confused with prescription
