= 2019 Epping Forest District Council election =

Essex local election

- 2 May 2019

18 of 58 seats on Epping Forest District Council 30 seats needed for a majority
- Turnout: 26.8% (▲2.0%)
	First party	Second party	Third party
Leader	Chris Whitbread	Caroline Pond	Jon Whitehouse
Party	Conservative	Loughton Residents	Liberal Democrats
Leader's seat	Epping Lindsey & Thornwood Common	Loughton St. John's	Epping Hemnall
Last election	39 seats, 43.7%	13 seats, 19.8%	2 seats, 15.4%
Seats before	40	13	2
Seats won	37	13	3
Seat change	▼2	Steady	▲1
Popular vote	7,612	N/A	3,958
Percentage	50.4%	N/A	26.2%
Swing	▲6.7%	N/A	▲10.8%
	Fourth party	Fifth party	Sixth party
Leader	Steven Neville	Julian Leppert	N/A
Party	Green	For Britain	Independent
Leader's seat	Buckhurst Hill East	Waltham Abbey Paternoster	N/A
Last election	2 seats, 7.7%	N/A	2 seats, 3.0%
Seats before	2	0	1
Seats won	3	1	1
Seat change	▲1	▲1	▼1
Popular vote	976	571	334
Percentage	6.4%	3.7%	1.9%
Swing	▼1.3%	N/A	▼2.1%
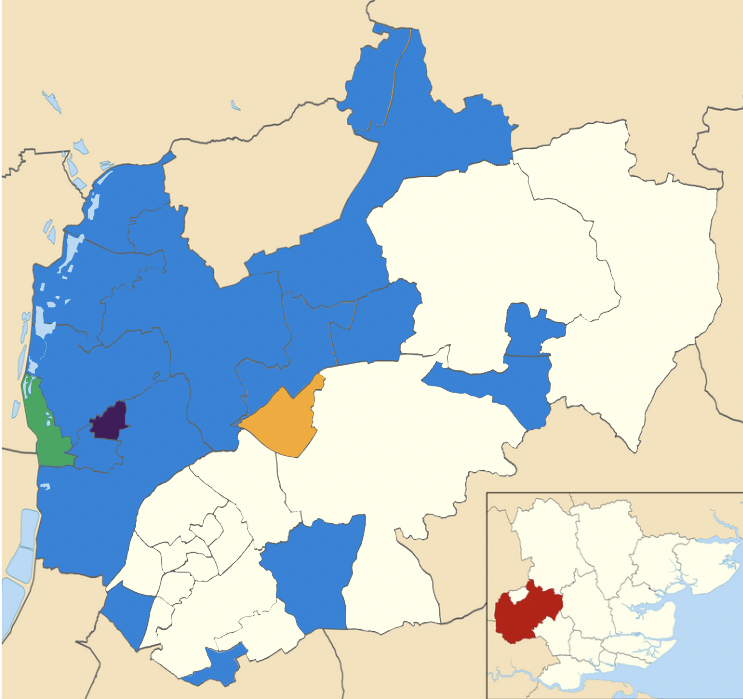
- Results of the 2019 District Council elections

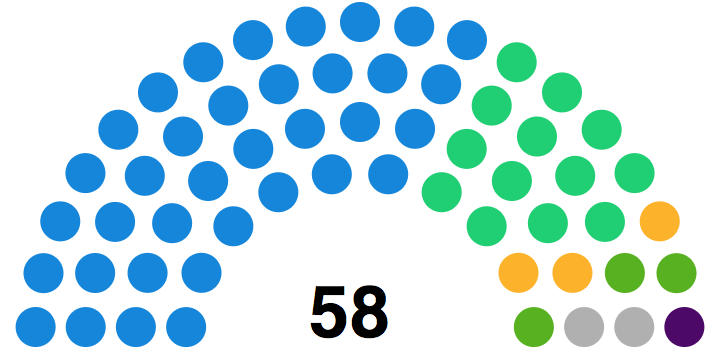
- Council composition following the election
Council control before election
Conservative
Council control after election
Conservative

The 2019 Epping Forest District Council election took place on 2 May 2019 to elect members of Epping Forest District Council in England. This was on the same day as other local elections.

== Ward Results ==
Figures are compared to the last time these seats were contested in any election cycle for the Epping Forest District Council election, this is indicated.

=== Broadley Common, Epping Upland and Nazeing ===
Broadley Common, Epping Upland and Nazeing (compared with 2015 results)
Party	Candidate	Votes	%	±%
Conservative	Nigel Avey	313	71.6	▲21.2
Green	Anna Widdup	87	19.9	▲12.5
Liberal Democrats	Edward Barnard	37	8.4	▲6.2
Majority		226	51.7	▲41.0
Turnout		437	25.0	▲7.0
Conservative hold		Swing		

=== Buckhurst Hill West ===
Buckhurst Hill West (compared with 2018 results)
Party	Candidate	Votes	%	±%
Conservative	Aniket Patel	977	47.7	▼0.3
Liberal Democrats	Joseph Barkham	891	43.5	▲4.4
Labour	Jill Bostock	126	6.1	New
Young People's	Thomas Hall	51	2.4	New
Majority		86	4.2	▼4.7
Turnout		2,045	38.0	▲3.0
Conservative hold		Swing		

=== Chipping Ongar, Greensted and Marden Ash ===
Chipping Ongar, Greensted and Marden Ash (compared with 2018 results)
Party	Candidate	Votes	%	±%
Conservative	Paul Keska	573	59.5	▼10.0
Liberal Democrats	Allan Edmunds	224	23.2	▼7.2
English Democrat	Robin Tilbrook	166	17.2	New
Majority		349	36.3	▼2.8
Turnout		963	28.0	▼2.0
Conservative hold		Swing		

=== Epping Hemnall ===
Epping Hemnall (compared with 2018 results)
Party	Candidate	Votes	%	±%
Liberal Democrats	Cherry McCredie	1,066	62.7	▲1.5
Conservative	Michael Ellis	547	32.2	▲2.9
Labour	Inez Collier	85	5.0	▼4.3
Majority		519	30.5	▼1.4
Turnout		1,698	35.0	▼3.0
Liberal Democrats gain from Conservative		Swing		

=== Epping Lindsey and Thornwood Common ===
Epping Lindsey and Thornwood Common (compared with 2018 results)
Party	Candidate	Votes	%	±%
Conservative	Chris Whitbread	862	46.0	▲2.3
Liberal Democrats	Ingrid Black	783	41.8	▼0.2
Labour	Simon Bullough	116	6.2	▼3.2
Independent	Barry Johns	109	5.8	New
Majority		79	4.2	▲2.5
Turnout		1,870	35.0	▼1.0
Conservative hold		Swing		

=== Grange Hill ===
Grange Hill (compared with 2018 results)
Party	Candidate	Votes	%	±%
Conservative	Sheree Rackham	699	64.0	▲6.1
Labour	Kay Morrison	392	36.0	▲3.8
Majority		307	28.0	▲2.3
Turnout		1,091	21.0	▼5.0
Conservative hold		Swing		

=== Hastingwood, Matching and Sheering ===
Hastingwood, Matching and Sheering (compared with 2015 results)
Party	Candidate	Votes	%	±%
Conservative	Richard Morgan	Unopposed		
Majority		New	New	▲53.9
Turnout		New	New	
Conservative gain from Independent		Swing		

Richard Morgan had been elected as an independent in 2015 but was re-elected (unopposed) as a Conservative in 2019. Recorded as a Conservative gain from independent to allow for comparison with previous election.

=== Lambourne ===
Lambourne (compared with 2015 results)
Party	Candidate	Votes	%	±%
Conservative	Brian Rolfe	316	74.7	▲5.1
Liberal Democrats	Richard Griffiths	107	25.3	New
Majority		209	49.4	▲10.1
Turnout		423	27.0	▼41.0
Conservative hold		Swing		

=== Lower Nazeing ===
Lower Nazeing (compared with 2018 results)
Party	Candidate	Votes	%	±%
Conservative	Richard Bassett	532	59.3	▼9.2
UKIP	Martin Harvey	208	23.2	▲12.5
Liberal Democrats	Elaine Thatcher	156	17.4	▲8.1
Majority		324	36.1	▼21.2
Turnout		896	27.0	▲3.0
Conservative hold		Swing		

=== Lower Sheering ===
Lower Sheering (compared with 2015 results)
Party	Candidate	Votes	%	±%
Conservative	Paul Stalker	264	68.2	▼1.6
Liberal Democrats	Pesh Kapasiawala	123	31.8	New
Majority		141	36.4	▼3.3
Turnout		387	23.0	▼46.0
Conservative hold		Swing		

=== North Weald Bassett ===
North Weald Bassett (compared with 2018 results)
Party	Candidate	Votes	%	±%
Conservative	Jaymey McIvor	470	53.5	▼26.0
Independent	Andy Tyler	225	25.6	New
Liberal Democrats	Georgia Simmons	183	20.8	▲0.4
Majority		245	27.9	▼31.2
Turnout		878	24.0	▼5.0
Conservative hold		Swing		

=== Roydon ===
Roydon (compared with 2015 results)
Party	Candidate	Votes	%	±%
Conservative	Mary Sartin	341	71.3	▼12.0
Labour	Stuart Shipton	76	15.8	▼0.8
Liberal Democrats	Clive Amos	61	12.7	New
Majority		265	55.5	▼1.2
Turnout		478	28.0	▼52.0
Conservative hold		Swing		

=== Shelley ===
Shelley (compared with 2015 results)
Party	Candidate	Votes	%	±%
Conservative	Nigel Bedford	Unopposed		
Majority		New	New	▲51.7
Turnout		New	New	
Conservative hold		Swing		

=== Waltham Abbey High Beach ===
Waltham Abbey High Beach (compared with 2015 results)
Party	Candidate	Votes	%	±%
Conservative	Syd Stavrou	295	59.9	▼7.7
Liberal Democrats	Naomi Davies	101	20.5	New
Independent	Paul Morris	96	19.5	▼12.8
Majority		194	39.4	▲4.1
Turnout		492	25.0	▼39.0
Conservative hold		Swing		

=== Waltham Abbey North East ===
Waltham Abbey North East (compared with 2016 results)
Party	Candidate	Votes	%	±%
Conservative	Ann Mitchell	457	60.5	▲2.9
Green	Rebecca Fricker	182	24.1	▲16.5
Liberal Democrats	Timothy Vaughan	116	15.3	▲6.4
Majority		275	36.4	▲1.6
Turnout		755	24.0	▼3.0
Conservative hold		Swing		

=== Waltham Abbey Paternoster ===
Waltham Abbey Paternoster (compared with 2018 results)
Party	Candidate	Votes	%	±%
For Britain	Julian Leppert	321	40.7	New
Conservative	Liz Webster	227	28.8	▼21.7
Labour	Gareth Rawlings	140	17.7	▼12.0
Green	Vernon Gurtner	69	8.7	▼2.6
Liberal Democrats	Nick Read	31	3.9	New
Majority		94	11.9	N/A
Turnout		788	23.0	▲3.0
For Britain gain from Conservative		Swing		

=== Waltham Abbey Honey Lane ===
Waltham Abbey Honey Lane (compared with 2018 results)
Party	Candidate	Votes	%	±%
Conservative	Sam Kane	437	40.2	▼15.3
For Britain	Patricia Richardson	250	23.0	New
Labour	Robert Greyson	175	16.1	▼0.3
Green	Carina Hall	145	13.3	▲1.4
Liberal Democrats	Philip Chadburn	79	7.2	▲2.1
Majority		187	17.2	▼21.9
Turnout		1,086	23.0	▼3.0
Conservative hold		Swing		

=== Waltham Abbey South West ===
Waltham Abbey South West (compared with 2016 results)
Party	Candidate	Votes	%	±%
Green	Dave Plummer	493	62.0	▲38.4
Conservative	Ricki Gadsby	302	38.0	▼3.6
Majority		191	24.0	N/A
Turnout		795	24.0	▲1.0
Green gain from Conservative		Swing		
