= Washington Agreement (disambiguation) =

The Washington Agreement was a peace agreement that led to the modern Bosnia and Herzegovina, signed in 1994.

Washington Agreement or Washington Accords may also refer to:

- Washington Accords (1942), the Brazil-United States Political-Military Agreement leading to Brazil entering World War II
- Washington Accord (Kargil War), in 1999 involved India and Pakistan
- Washington Accord (credentials), an international accreditation agreement for undergraduate professional engineering academic degrees
- Washington Agreement on Gold, The Washington Central Banks Agreement on Gold (26 September 1999)
- Anglo-American Petroleum Agreement or Washington Agreement, a failed attempt by the British and American governments to establish a lasting agreement to manage international petroleum supply and demand (1944)
- Kosovo and Serbia economic normalization agreements (2020) or the Washington Agreement, a pair of documents in which Kosovo and Serbia agreed to facilitate economic normalization (September 4 2020)
- 2025 Democratic Republic of the Congo–Rwanda peace agreement

== See also ==
- Washington Declaration (disambiguation)
- Washington Naval Conference of 1922, a disarmament conference resulting in three treaties:
  - Four-Power Treaty, of 1922
  - Five-Power Treaty of 1922, commonly known as the Washington Naval Treaty
  - Nine-Power Treaty, of 1922
- G8+5, an international group that consisted of the leaders of 13 developed nations or emerging economies
