= Washington Declaration =

Washington Declaration may refer to:

- Czechoslovak Declaration of Independence or Washington Declaration (1918), declaration proclaiming the First Czechoslovak Republic
- Washington Principles on Nazi-Confiscated Art or Washington Declaration (1998), statement concerning the restitution of art confiscated by the Nazi regime during World War II
- 1994 declaration that paved the way for the Israel–Jordan Treaty of Peace
- An agreement announced at the 2008 G20 Washington summit regarding objectives to strengthen economic growth and deal with financial crisis
- February 2007 Washington Declaration, a G8+5 post–Kyoto Protocol non-binding agreement on a global cap-and-trade system
- In South Korea–United States relations, an April 2023 nuclear deterrence plan aimed at North Korea

== See also ==
- Washington (disambiguation)
- Declaration (disambiguation)
- Washington Agreement (disambiguation)
- Washington Convention or CITES, a multilateral treaty to protect endangered plants and animals
- An Evangelical Manifesto, 2008 document subtitled The Washington Declaration of Evangelical Identity and Public Commitment
- Timeline of the Joe Biden presidency (2021 Q3) for a July 15 conference with German Chancellor Angela Merkel
