= 2013 Essex County Council election =

2013 UK local government election

- 2 May 2013

All 75 seats to Essex County Council 38 seats needed for a majority

	First party	Second party	Third party
Leader	Peter Martin	Brian Wood	Julie Young
Party	Conservative	UKIP	Labour
Leader since	February 2010	30 July 2012	June 2009
Leader's seat	Chelmer (Retiring)	Canvey Island East (Defeated)	Wivenhoe St. Andrew
Last election	60 seats, 43.3%	0 seats, 4.6%	1 seat, 10.8%
Seats before	58	1	2
Seats won	42	9	9
Seat change	▼18	▲9	▲8
Popular vote	112,229	90,812	57,250
Percentage	34.2%	27.7%	17.4%
Swing	▼8.9%	▲23.1%	▲6.7%
	Fourth party	Fifth party	Sixth party
Leader	Michael Mackrory	N/a	Terry Allen
Party	Liberal Democrats	Green	Tendring First
Leader since	May 2012	N/A	February 2007
Leader's seat	Springfield	N/A	Brightlingsea (Not Elected)
Last election	12 seats, 20.1%	0 seats, 6.8%	0 seats, 1.5%
Seats before	11	0	0
Seats won	9	2	1
Seat change	▼3	▲2	▲1
Popular vote	35,680	15,187	5,866
Percentage	10.9%	4.6%	1.2%
Swing	▼9.2%	▼2.2%	▼0.3%
	Seventh party	Eighth party
Leader	Chris Pond	Dave Blackwell
Party	Loughton Residents	CIIP
Leader since	May 2005	22 April 2004
Leader's seat	Loughton Central	Canvey Island East
Last election	1 seat, 0.7%	1 seat, 0.4%
Seats before	1	0
Seats won	1	1
Seat change	Steady	Steady
Popular vote	3,286	2,777
Percentage	1.0%	0.8%
Swing	▲0.3%	▲0.4%
- Map showing the results of the 2013 Essex County Council elections.
Majority party before election
Conservative
Majority party after election
Conservative

The 2013 Essex County Council election took place on 2 May 2013 to elect members of Essex County Council in Essex, England. They were held on the same day as other local elections. 75 councillors were elected from 70 electoral divisions, which returned either one or two county councillors each by first-past-the-post voting for a four-year term of office. The electoral divisions were the same as those used at the previous election in 2009. No elections were held in Thurrock or Southend-on-Sea, which are unitary authorities outside the area covered by the County Council.

All locally registered electors (British, Irish, Commonwealth and European Union citizens) who were aged 18 or over on Thursday 2 May 2013 were entitled to vote in the local elections. Those who were temporarily away from their ordinary address (for example, away working, on holiday, in student accommodation or in hospital) were also entitled to vote in the local elections, although those who had moved abroad and registered as overseas electors cannot vote in the local elections. It is possible to register to vote at more than one address (such as a university student who had a term-time address and lives at home during holidays) at the discretion of the local Electoral Register Office, but it remains an offence to vote more than once in the same local government election.

== Previous composition ==
=== 2009 election ===
Party	Seats
Conservative	60
Liberal Democrats	12
Labour	1
Loughton Residents	1
CIIP	1
Total	75

=== Composition of council seats before election ===
Party	Seats
Conservative	58
Liberal Democrats	11
Labour	2
UKIP	1
Loughton Residents	1
Independent	1
Vacant	1
Total	75

=== Changes between elections ===
In between the 2009 election and the 2013 election, the following council seats changed hands:

Division	Date	Previous Party	New Party	Cause	Resulting Council Composition						
Division	Date	Previous Party	New Party	Cause	Con	LDem	Lab	LRes	CInd	UKIP	Ind
Harlow West	5 May 2011	Conservative	Labour	Conservative incumbent disqualified. Labour won by-election.	59	12	2	1	1	0	0
Chelmsford Central	9 June 2011	Liberal Democrats	Conservative	Sitting councillor died. Conservatives won by-election.	60	11	2	1	1	0	0
Canvey Island East	November 2011	CIIP	Independent	Councillor quit party to sit as an independent member.	60	11	2	1	0	0	1
Canvey Island East	30 July 2012	Independent	UKIP	Sitting councillor joined UKIP.	60	11	2	1	0	1	0
Rochford South	February 2013	Conservative	Vacant	Sitting councillor died. (Note: No by-election was held as the death was sufficiently close to the upcoming County election.)	59	11	2	1	0	1	0
Wickford Crouch	February 2013	Conservative	Independent	Councillor quit party to sit as an independent member.	58	11	2	1	0	1	1

== Summary ==
The election saw the Conservative Party retain overall control of the council, but their majority fell from twenty-two to four councillors. UKIP, Labour and the Liberal Democrats all won nine seats. Of the three second-placed parties who won nine seats, UKIP gained the largest share of the county-wide vote, more than 10% ahead of the Labour Party. The Liberal Democrats remain as the official Opposition (entitling them to certain expenses and rights to additional speeches) due to incumbency, despite winning fewer votes. The Green Party gained two seats on the council, despite its overall share of the vote falling. The Independent Loughton Residents Association and the Canvey Island Independent Party both returned one member and an Independent candidate was also elected.

== Results summary ==
2013 Essex County Council election
Party	Seats	Gains	Losses	Net gain/loss	Seats %	Votes %	Votes	+/−
Conservative	42	1	19	−18	56.0	34.2	112,229	−9.1
UKIP	9	9	0	+9	12.0	27.6	90,812	+23.0
Labour	9	8	0	+8	12.0	17.4	57,290	+6.7
Liberal Democrats	9	0	3	−3	12.0	10.9	35,651	−8.5
Green	2	2	0	+2	2.7	4.6	15,187	−2.0
Tendring First	1	1	0	+1	1.3	1.2	4,093	−0.1
Independent	1	1	0	+1	1.3	1.1	3,625	+0.1
Loughton Residents	1	0	0	Steady	1.3	1.0	3,286	+0.4
CIIP	1	0	0	Steady	1.3	0.8	2,777	+0.5
BNP	0	0	0	0	0.0	0.3	909	−8.6
English Democrat	0	0	0	0	0.0	0.3	835	−1.0
SWFCTA	0	0	0	Steady	0.0	0.2	757	New
TUSC	0	0	0	Steady	0.0	0.1	431	New
National Front	0	0	0	Steady	0.0	0.1	304	New
Community Rep.	0	0	0	Steady	0.0	0.1	204	−0.3
No label	0	0	0	Steady	0.0	>0.1	24	New
Young People's	0	0	0	Steady	0.0	>0.1	21	New
Total	75						328,435	

=== Election of Group Leaders ===
David Finch (Hedingham) was elected leader of the Conservative Group, with Kevin Bentley (Stanway and Pyefleet) as his deputy.

Michael Mackrory (Springfield) was re elected leader of the Liberal Democratic Group, with Theresa Higgins (Parsons Heath and East Gates) as his deputy.

Julie Young (Wivenhoe St. Andrew) was re elected leader of the Labour Group, with Ivan Henderson (Harwich) as her deputy.

Roger Lord (Brightlingsea) was elected leader of the UKIP group, with Jamie Huntman (Thundersley) as his deputy.

James Abbott (Witham Northern) was elected leader of the Green group, with Michael Hoy (Rochford West) as his deputy.

Chris Pond (Loughton Central) was elected leader of the Non-Aligned Group with John Lodge (Saffron Walden) as his deputy.

==== Mid term changes ====
On 3 September 2014 Lord resigned both as UKIP group leader and from the council after being replaced as that party's candidate for Clacton by Tory defector Douglas Carswell, Huntman succeeded him. Nigel Le Gresley (Wickford Crouch) would in turn replace Huntman, with Andrew Erskine (Tendring Rural East) as his deputy before he resigned from the party in March 2016 with Huntman again replacing him.

In mid 2016 deputy Labour leader Ivan Henderson (Harwich) replaced Young as leader with Michael Danvers (Harlow North) as his deputy.

=== Election of Leader of the Council ===
David Finch the leader of the Conservative group was duly elected leader of the council and formed a conservative administration.

== Results by District ==
=== Basildon ===
District Summary

Party	Seats	+/-	Votes	%	+/-
UKIP	3	▲3	17,863	33.4	+22.9
Conservative	3	▼6	17,229	32.2	−11.2
Labour	3	▲3	12,645	23.7	+7.7
Liberal Democrat	0	Steady	2,772	5.2	−9.9
Green	0	Steady	1,458	2.7	+2.7
Independent	0	Steady	1,109	2.1	+2.1
National Front	0	Steady	304	0.6	−13.3
TUSC	0	Steady	73	0.1	+0.1

Division Results

Basildon Westley Heights
Party	Candidate	Votes	%	±%
UKIP	Kerry Smith	1,347	29.0	+16.3
Conservative	John Schofield *	1,208	26.0	−8.6
Liberal Democrats	Geoffrey Williams	1,057	22.8	−7.2
Labour	David Burton-Sampson	943	20.3	+8.2
Green	Martin Wargent	66	1.4	+1.4
No label	None Of The Above X	24	0.5	+0.5
Majority		139	3.0	−1.6
Turnout		4,645	21.1	−14.8
UKIP gain from Conservative		Swing	+12.4	

Billericay and Burstead (2)
Party	Candidate	Votes	%	±%
Conservative	Anthony Hedley *	3,661	53.3	–9.1
Conservative	Kay Twitchen *	3,523	51.3	+0.9
UKIP	Terry Gandy	2,103	30.6	+13.3
UKIP	Susan McCaffery	1,957	28.5	N/A
Labour	Alan Bennett	658	9.6	+0.4
Labour	Santa Bennett	563	8.2	+1.0
Liberal Democrats	Nigel Horn	437	6.4	−10.0
Green	Stephen Watson	290	4.2	N/A
Green	Nelson Brunton	285	4.2	N/A
Liberal Democrats	Martin Howard	256	3.7	–11.5
Turnout		13,733	26.1	−13.2
Conservative hold				
Conservative hold				

Laindon Park and Fryerns (2)
Party	Candidate	Votes	%	±%
Labour	William Archibald	2,277	41.9	+12.2
UKIP	Mark Ellis	2,175	40.0	N/A
Labour	Anne Fryatt	1,980	36.4	+12.5
UKIP	David Sheppard	1,684	31.0	N/A
Conservative	John Dornan *	958	17.6	−15.8
Conservative	Terri Sargent *	784	14.4	–18.0
Liberal Democrats	Francis Barnes-Challinor	215	4.0	−13.6
Liberal Democrats	Arnold Lutton	187	3.4	–13.8
National Front	Thomas Beaney	171	3.1	N/A
Green	Cheryl Gerrard	138	2.5	N/A
Independent	Pat Rackley	119	2.2	N/A
Green	Dawn Holmes	116	2.1	N/A
TUSC	David Murray	73	1.3	N/A
Turnout		10,877	20.7	−5.4
Labour gain from Conservative				
UKIP gain from Conservative				

Pitsea (2)
Party	Candidate	Votes	%	±%
Labour	Keith Bobbin	2,488	42.7	+17.0
Labour	Melissa McGeorge	2,181	37.4	+14.1
UKIP	Andrew Ager	2,055	35.3	+13.4
UKIP	Terry McBride	1,925	33.0	+12.3
Conservative	Sandra Hillier *	1,257	21.6	−9.3
Conservative	Andrew Schrader	1,103	18.9	–8.0
Green	Freddie Gerrard-Abbott	205	3.5	N/A
Liberal Democrats	Ben Williams	167	2.9	−7.1
Liberal Democrats	Linda Williams	145	2.5	–6.3
National Front	Anthony Harms	133	2.1	N/A
Turnout		11,659	20.0	−8.2
Labour gain from Conservative				
Labour gain from Conservative				

Wickford Crouch (2)
Party	Candidate	Votes	%	±%
Conservative	Malcolm Buckley	2,661	42.4	−11.8
UKIP	Nigel Le Gresley	2,396	38.2	+16.9
UKIP	Paul Downes	2,221	35.4	N/A
Conservative	Don Morris *	2,074	33.1	–19.0
Independent	Iris Pummell *	966	15.4	N/A
Labour	Albert Ede	790	12.6	+2.6
Labour	Andrew Buxton	765	12.2	+2.9
Green	Poppy Gerrard-Abbott	191	3.0	N/A
Liberal Democrats	Philip Jenkins	171	2.7	−10.9
Green	Karin Riedl	167	2.7	N/A
Liberal Democrats	Steve Nice	137	2.2	–9.8
Turnout		12,539	22.7	−11.4
Conservative hold				
UKIP gain from Conservative				

=== Braintree ===
District Summary

Party	Seats	+/-	Votes	%	+/-
Conservative	6	▼2	12,107	37.8	−6.5
UKIP	1	▲1	8,704	27.2	+19.8
Green	1	▲1	2,601	10.3	−2.4
Labour	0	Steady	6,945	21.7	+7.9
Liberal Democrat	0	Steady	1,424	4.5	−8.4
BNP	0	Steady	223	0.7	−6.1

Division Results

Bocking
Party	Candidate	Votes	%	±%
UKIP	Gordon Helm	1,340	32.7	+15.0
Conservative	David Baugh	1,320	32.2	−5.2
Labour	Lynn Watson	1,226	29.9	+9.4
Green	Andrea Bunn	126	3.1	−3.1
Liberal Democrats	Pamela Hooper	91	2.2	−9.6
Majority		20	0.5	−16.3
Turnout		4,103	29.0	−7.5
UKIP gain from Conservative		Swing	+10.1	

Braintree Eastern
Party	Candidate	Votes	%	±%
Conservative	Patricia Newton	1,605	40.6	−4.9
UKIP	Philip Palij	1098	27.8	+27.8
Labour	Moia Thorogood	790	20.0	+5.3
Green	John Malam	233	5.9	−5.0
Liberal Democrats	James Fleet	180	4.6	−7.4
BNP	John Key	43	1.1	−6.2
Majority		507	12.8	−18.0
Turnout		3,949	29.4	−10.6
Conservative hold		Swing	−16.4	

Braintree Town
Party	Candidate	Votes	%	±%
Conservative	Graham Butland *	1,152	32.8	−2.5
Labour	Bill Edwards	1,121	31.9	+12.3
UKIP	Rod Challis	953	27.1	+12.6
Green	Timothy Reeve	159	4.5	−1.7
Liberal Democrats	Hayden Hooper	126	3.6	−9.8
Majority		31	0.9	−14.8
Turnout		3,511	25.2	−10.1
Conservative hold		Swing	−7.4	

Halstead
Party	Candidate	Votes	%	±%
Conservative	Joseph Pike *	1,597	39.6	−1.3
UKIP	Michael Ford	1,144	28.3	+13.6
Labour	Malcolm Fincken	891	22.1	+10.9
Green	Stephen Hicks	198	4.9	−2.8
Liberal Democrats	Bernard Dearlove	164	4.1	−6.8
BNP	Paul Hooks	44	1.1	−3.8
Majority		453	11.2	−14.9
Turnout		4,038	26.4	−10.5
Conservative hold		Swing	−7.5	

Hedingham
Party	Candidate	Votes	%	±%
Conservative	David Finch *	2,190	48.7	−5.8
UKIP	Frank Ferguson	1,096	24.4	+24.4
Labour	Stephen Knight	579	12.9	+5.8
Liberal Democrats	Steve Bolter	361	8.0	−10.5
Green	Joyce Wells	225	5.0	−6.6
BNP	Tina Gentry	44	1.0	−7.3
Majority		1,094	24.3	−11.7
Turnout		4,495	31.3	−13.4
Conservative hold		Swing	−15.1	

Three Fields with Great Notley
Party	Candidate	Votes	%	±%
Conservative	Roger Walters *	1,613	47.7	−8.2
UKIP	Susan Hoye	950	28.1	+28.1
Labour	Juliet Walton	462	13.7	+7.9
Green	Robert Wright	207	6.1	−2.6
Liberal Democrats	Derek Ray	149	4.4	−8.5
Majority		663	19.6	−23.4
Turnout		3,381	27.7	−13.1
Conservative hold		Swing	−18.1	

Witham Northern
Party	Candidate	Votes	%	±%
Green	James Abbott	1,209	26.4	+3.2
UKIP	David Hodges	1,148	25.0	+11.7
Conservative	Michael Lager *	1,120	24.4	−7.4
Labour	Philip Barlow	944	20.6	+3.8
Liberal Democrats	David Toombs	126	2.8	−6.0
BNP	Peter Stone	38	0.8	−5.4
Majority		61	1.3	−7.3
Turnout		4,585	32.3	−9.6
Green gain from Conservative		Swing	+5.3	

Witham Southern
Party	Candidate	Votes	%	±%
Conservative	Derrick Louis *	1,490	37.8	−11.5
UKIP	Christopher Warner	995	25.2	+25.2
Labour	Celia Burne	932	23.6	+8.1
Green	Philip Hughes	244	6.2	−6.3
Liberal Democrats	Barry Fleet	227	5.8	−7.3
BNP	Leonard Perry	54	1.4	−8.2
Majority		495	12.6	−21.1
Turnout		3,942	25.8	−10.2
Conservative hold		Swing	−18.4	

=== Brentwood ===
District Summary

Party	Seats	+/-	Votes	%	+/-
Conservative	2	Steady	6,186	36.7	−12.6
Liberal Democrat	2	Steady	4,282	25.4	−4.5
UKIP	0	Steady	4,336	25.7	+20.2
Labour	0	Steady	1,541	9.1	+1.8
Green	0	Steady	500	3.0	+3.0
English Democrat	0	Steady	31	0.2	−0.6

Division Results

Brentwood Hutton
Party	Candidate	Votes	%	±%
Conservative	Roger Hirst	2,053	48.0	−17.4
UKIP	David Watt	1,280	29.9	+29.9
Labour	Mike Le-Surf	437	10.2	+3.4
Liberal Democrats	Alfred Newberry	353	8.3	−9.8
Green	David Andrews	152	3.6	+3.6
Majority		773	18.1	−29.3
Turnout		4,275	27.9	−14.7
Conservative hold		Swing	−23.7	

Brentwood North
Party	Candidate	Votes	%	±%
Liberal Democrats	Barry Aspinell *	1,842	43.3	−2.2
Conservative	Chris Hossack	1,169	27.5	−12.9
UKIP	Michael McGough	863	20.3	+20.3
Labour	Yvonne Waterhouse	266	6.3	−3.2
Green	Simon Attwood	116	2.7	+2.7
Majority		673	15.8	+10.7
Turnout		4,256	29.9	−15.3
Liberal Democrats hold		Swing	+5.4	

Brentwood Rural
Party	Candidate	Votes	%	±%
Conservative	Ann Naylor *	1,847	44.4	−4.3
UKIP	Yvonne Maguire	1,425	34.2	+12.8
Liberal Democrats	Lisa Barrett	461	11.1	−5.3
Labour	Julie Morrissey	304	7.3	+2.1
Green	Howard Bills	126	3.0	+3.0
Majority		422	10.1	−17.1
Turnout		4,163	29.1	−15.4
Conservative hold		Swing	−8.6	

Brentwood South
Party	Candidate	Votes	%	±%
Liberal Democrats	David Kendall *	1,626	38.9	−2.6
Conservative	Keith Parker	1,117	26.7	−14.6
UKIP	Mark Allen	768	18.4	+18.4
Labour	Gareth Barrett	534	12.8	+4.7
Green	Stephanie Bills	106	2.5	+2.5
English Democrat	Oliver Tilbrook	31	0.7	+0.7
Majority		509	12.2	+12.0
Turnout		4,182	28.5	−13.0
Liberal Democrats hold		Swing	+6.0	

=== Castle Point ===
District Summary

Party	Seats	+/-	Votes	%	+/-
UKIP	2	▲2	6,466	34.0	+26.0
Conservative	2	▼2	6,404	33.8	−11.7
CIIP	1	Steady	2,777	15.6	+1.7
Labour	0	Steady	2,574	13.6	+2.3
Liberal Democrat	0	Steady	316	1.8	−5.0
Green	0	Steady	250	1.3	−3.4
BNP	0	Steady	214	1.1	−9.9
Independent	0	Steady	185	1.0	+1.0

Division Results

Canvey Island East
Party	Candidate	Votes	%	±%
CIIP	Dave Blackwell	1,766	44.3	+9.4
UKIP	Brian Wood *	1,145	28.7	+28.7
Conservative	David Cross	619	15.5	−16.0
Labour Co-op	Matthew Reilly	356	8.9	−1.9
BNP	John Morgan	79	2.0	−14.7
Liberal Democrats	Owen Bartholomew	24	0.6	−5.6
Majority		621	15.6	+12.2
Turnout		3,989	26.4	−8.2
CIIP hold		Swing	−9.6	

Canvey Island West
Party	Candidate	Votes	%	±%
Conservative	Raymond Howard *	1,310	37.1	−6.0
CIIP	Peter May	1,011	28.6	−8.0
UKIP	Anna Wood	850	24.1	+24.1
Labour Co-op	Esther Akinnuwa	278	7.9	+0.9
BNP	Stephen Smith	59	1.7	−9.5
Liberal Democrats	Paul Westlake	26	0.7	−1.4
Majority		299	8.5	+2.0
Turnout		3,534	26.3	−8.3
Conservative hold		Swing	+1.0	

Hadleigh
Party	Candidate	Votes	%	±%
Conservative	Jillian Reeves *	1,846	44.7	−7.3
UKIP	Michael Dixon	1,389	33.6	+15.7
Labour Co-op	Joe Reeder	518	12.5	+3.7
Green	Douglas Copping	250	6.1	−1.4
Liberal Democrats	Elena Black	130	3.2	−4.0
Majority		457	11.1	−23.0
Turnout		4,133	30.0	−12.3
Conservative hold		Swing	−11.5	

South Benfleet
Party	Candidate	Votes	%	±%
UKIP	Alan Bayley	1,723	41.9	+41.9
Conservative	Colin Riley *	1,481	36.0	−17.9
Labour Co-op	Brian Wilson	787	19.1	+4.0
Liberal Democrats	Terry Cooper	86	2.1	−7.4
BNP	Philip Howell	35	0.9	−12.2
Majority		242	5.9	−33.0
Turnout		4,112	31.2	−7.5
UKIP gain from Conservative		Swing	+29.9	

Thundersley
Party	Candidate	Votes	%	±%
UKIP	Jamie Huntman	1,359	39.8	+20.4
Conservative	William Dick *	1,148	33.6	−10.3
Labour Co-op	Joe Cooke	635	18.6	+4.7
Independent	Geoff Robinson	185	5.4	+5.4
Liberal Democrats	Dominic Graham	50	1.5	−6.7
BNP	Paul Maylin	41	1.2	−6.7
Majority		211	6.2	−18.4
Turnout		3,418	27.7	−10.9
UKIP gain from Conservative		Swing	+15.4	

=== Chelmsford ===
District Summary

Party	Seats	+/-	Votes	%	+/-
Conservative	6	▲2	12,982	35.7	−8.6
Liberal Democrat	3	▼2	7,701	21.2	−10.5
UKIP	0	Steady	9,328	25.6	+24.0
Labour	0	Steady	4,157	8.8	+4.7
Green	0	Steady	1,472	4.0	−3.0
SWFCTA	0	Steady	757	2.1	−0.1
English Democrat	0	Steady	51	0.1	+0.1

Division Results

Broomfield and Writtle
Party	Candidate	Votes	%	±%
Conservative	John Aldridge *	1,985	43.9	−12.8
UKIP	Ian Nicholls	1,346	29.8	+29.8
Liberal Democrats	Graham Pooley	570	12.6	−8.0
Labour	Philip Gaudin	387	8.6	+2.1
Green	Reza Hossain	184	4.1	−4.5
English Democrat	Claire Breed	51	1.1	+1.1
Majority		639	14.1	−22.0
Turnout		4,523	30.0	−9.3
Conservative hold		Swing	−21.3	

Chelmer
Party	Candidate	Votes	%	±%
Conservative	John Spence	2,044	49.0	−8.9
UKIP	Thomas Jones	1,029	24.7	+24.7
Labour	Raymond Barry	466	11.2	+4.8
Liberal Democrats	Martin Ashby	428	10.3	−9.4
Green	Colin Budgey	206	4.9	−5.0
Majority		1,015	24.3	−14.0
Turnout		4,173	25.5	−11.6
Conservative hold		Swing	−16.8	

Chelmsford Central
Party	Candidate	Votes	%	±%
Conservative	Dick Madden *	1,233	35.8	+2.2
Liberal Democrats	David Jones	895	26.0	−18.5
UKIP	John Theedom	711	20.6	+20.6
Labour	Edward Massey	431	12.5	+4.8
Green	Tony Lane	175	5.1	−3.1
Majority		338	9.8	−1.0
Turnout		3,454	28.2	−11.4
Conservative gain from Liberal Democrats		Swing	+10.3	

Chelmsford North
Party	Candidate	Votes	%	±%
Liberal Democrats	Stephen Robinson *	1,501	37.4	−9.3
Conservative	Robert Pontin	882	22.0	−10.0
UKIP	Leslie Retford	862	21.5	+21.5
Labour	Irene Ferguson	596	14.9	+7.0
Green	Angela Thomson	170	4.2	−3.0
Majority		619	15.4	+0.8
Turnout		4,011	29.1	−9.6
Liberal Democrats hold		Swing	+0.4	

Chelmsford West
Party	Candidate	Votes	%	±%
Liberal Democrats	Jude Deakin *	1,078	28.6	−12.7
Conservative	Graham Seeley	975	25.8	−6.8
UKIP	Eric Johnston	956	25.3	+25.3
Labour	Bill Horslen	642	17.0	+6.0
Green	Avril Howe	124	3.3	−4.2
Majority		103	2.7	−5.9
Turnout		3,775	25.9	−9.6
Liberal Democrats hold		Swing	−3.0	

Great Baddow
Party	Candidate	Votes	%	±%
Conservative	Jenny Chandler	1,440	31.2	−2.4
UKIP	Jeanette Howes	1,368	29.6	+17.0
Liberal Democrats	Chris Rycroft	1,191	25.8	−15.2
Labour	Richard Hyland	472	10.2	+5.0
Green	Darryl Newport	152	3.3	−0.9
Majority		72	1.6	−5.8
Turnout		4,623	29.3	−11.5
Conservative gain from Liberal Democrats		Swing	+6.4	

South Woodham Ferrers
Party	Candidate	Votes	%	±%
Conservative	Norman Hume *	893	33.8	−10.1
SWFCTA	Ian Roberts	757	28.6	+2.5
UKIP	Cliff Hammans	560	21.2	+21.2
Labour	Derek Barnett	289	10.9	+3.9
Liberal Democrats	Noel Sutcliffe	94	3.6	−6.0
Green	Robert King	51	1.9	−2.8
Majority		136	5.1	−12.6
Turnout		2,644	20.7	−12.1
Conservative hold		Swing	−6.3	

Springfield
Party	Candidate	Votes	%	±%
Liberal Democrats	Michael Mackrory *	1,767	35.5	−10.2
Conservative	Jean Murray	1,463	29.4	−8.2
UKIP	Nicholas Tidman	991	19.9	+19.9
Labour	David Howell	519	10.4	+5.6
Green	Jeremy Jacobs	239	4.8	−0.7
Majority		304	6.1	−2.0
Turnout		4,979	31.7	−9.0
Liberal Democrats hold		Swing	−1.0	

Stock
Party	Candidate	Votes	%	±%
Conservative	Ian Grundy *	2,067	48.4	−17.4
UKIP	Jesse Pryke	1,505	35.2	+35.2
Labour	Maurice Austin	355	8.3	+3.1
Liberal Democrats	Matt Klesel	177	4.1	−8.4
Green	Rachel Brunton	171	4.0	−4.7
Majority		562	13.1	−40.0
Turnout		4,275	30.8	−11.3
Conservative hold		Swing	−26.3	

=== Colchester ===
District Summary

Party	Seats	+/-	Votes	%	+/-
Conservative	4	Steady	10,597	29.5	−5.5
Liberal Democrat	3	▼1	7,705	21.5	−12.7
Labour	2	▲1	7,127	19.9	+7.6
UKIP	0	Steady	8,058	22.5	+20.3
Green	0	Steady	2,394	6.7	−3.6

Division Results

Abbey
Party	Candidate	Votes	%	±%
Liberal Democrats	Margaret Fisher *	1,273	37.0	−13.4
UKIP	Harry Royle	786	22.8	N/A
Labour	Tyron Wilson	519	15.1	+7.4
Green	Peter Lynn	467	13.6	−4.3
Conservative	Saimon Rashid	395	11.5	−6.0
Majority		487	14.2	−18.4
Turnout		3,440	21.1	−9.9
Liberal Democrats hold		Swing	−18.1	

Constable
Party	Candidate	Votes	%	±%
Conservative	Anne Brown *	2,075	43.8	−7.7
UKIP	Mark Cole	1,471	31.0	+16.9
Labour	John Spademan	504	10.6	+4.1
Green	Roger Bamforth	387	8.2	−1.2
Liberal Democrats	Carolyn Catney	303	6.4	−6.8
Majority		604	12.7	−24.6
Turnout		4,740	31.6	−11.0
Conservative hold		Swing	−12.3	

Drury
Party	Candidate	Votes	%	±%
Conservative	Sue Lissimore	1,957	40.1	−0.5
Liberal Democrats	Nick Cope	1,127	23.1	−17.2
UKIP	John Pitts	951	19.5	N/A
Labour Co-op	Mike Dale	527	10.8	+5.3
Green	Steve Ford	314	6.4	−3.1
Majority		830	17.0	+16.7
Turnout		4,876	35.4	−9.0
Conservative hold		Swing	+8.4	

Maypole
Party	Candidate	Votes	%	±%
Labour	Dave Harris	1,665	43.9	+14.5
Liberal Democrats	Lyn Barton *	933	24.6	−7.6
UKIP	Raymond Tuttlebee	573	15.1	N/A
Conservative	Mike Hardy	475	12.5	−12.0
Green	Pam Nelson	143	3.8	−2.9
Majority		732	19.3	+16.5
Turnout		3,789	26.9	−5.6
Labour gain from Liberal Democrats		Swing	+11.1	

Mersea and Tiptree
Party	Candidate	Votes	%	±%
Conservative	John Jowers *	1,913	47.0	−9.7
UKIP	Rebecca Ager	1134	27.8	N/A
Labour	Audrey Spencer	629	15.4	+8.0
Green	Sue Bailey	216	5.3	−5.3
Liberal Democrats	Gill Collings	181	4.4	−12.5
Majority		779	19.1	−20.6
Turnout		4,073	28.0	−9.2
Conservative hold		Swing	−18.8	

Mile End and Highwoods
Party	Candidate	Votes	%	±%
Liberal Democrats	Anne Turrell *	1,417	39.2	−15.0
Conservative	Ben Locker	888	24.5	−4.3
UKIP	Bill Rowley	725	20.0	N/A
Labour	Jennie Fisher	408	11.3	+5.6
Green	Mary Bryan	180	5.0	−1.8
Majority		529	14.6	−10.7
Turnout		3,618	24.3	−10.0
Liberal Democrats hold		Swing	−5.3	

Parsons Heath and East Gates
Party	Candidate	Votes	%	±%
Liberal Democrats	Theresa Higgins *	1,259	36.6	−12.7
UKIP	Ron Levy	890	25.9	N/A
Conservative	Charles McKay	609	17.7	−9.0
Labour	Bob Fisher	489	14.2	+7.1
Green	Pat Rogers	192	5.6	−3.9
Majority		369	10.7	−11.8
Turnout		3,439	26.4	−8.3
Liberal Democrats hold		Swing	−19.3	

Stanway and Pyefleet
Party	Candidate	Votes	%	±%
Conservative	Kevin Bentley *	1,723	40.8	−3.9
UKIP	Imelda Clancy	929	22.0	N/A
Liberal Democrats	Jessica Scott-Boutell	829	19.7	−9.1
Labour	Robert Spademan	491	11.6	+1.3
Green	Walter Schwarz	247	5.9	−4.2
Majority		794	18.8	+2.8
Turnout		4,219	29.5	−8.4
Conservative hold		Swing	−13.0	

Wivenhoe St. Andrew
Party	Candidate	Votes	%	±%
Labour	Julie Young *	1,895	51.4	+16.7
UKIP	Graham Tricker	599	16.2	N/A
Conservative	Mo Metcalf-Fisher	562	15.2	−7.1
Liberal Democrats	Shaun Boughton	383	10.4	−15.2
Green	Tim Glover	248	6.7	−5.5
Majority		1,296	35.2	+26.1
Turnout		3,687	26.6	−6.4
Labour hold		Swing	+0.2	

=== Epping Forest ===
District Summary

Party	Seats	+/-	Votes	%	+/-
Conservative	6	Steady	15,695	41.8	−8.0
Loughton Residents	1	Steady	3,286	15.5	+5.7
Liberal Democrat	1	Steady	2,431	11.5	−9.1
UKIP	0	Steady	6,589	31.1	+22.5
Labour	0	Steady	2,092	9.9	+1.5
Green	0	Steady	1,061	5.0	−1.7
Independent	0	Steady	148	0.6	+0.1
English Democrat	0	Steady	93	0.4	−1.0
BNP	0	Steady	87	0.4	−10.1
Young People's Party	0	Steady	21	0.1	+0.1

Division Results

Buckhurst Hill and Loughton South
Party	Candidate	Votes	%	±%
Conservative	Valerie Metcalfe *	1,530	35.8	−4.3
Loughton Residents	Sharon Weston	1,017	23.8	N/A
UKIP	David Dorrell	790	18.5	+8.7
Labour	Andrew Forsley	336	7.9	+2.3
Green	Steven Neville	308	7.2	+1.2
Liberal Democrats	Garry Sadler	234	5.5	−24.6
Independent	Rodney Law	38	0.9	+0.9
Young People's	Gerard Wadsworth	21	0.5	+0.5
Majority		513	12.0	+2.0
Turnout		4,274	27.0	−14.4
Conservative hold		Swing	−14.0	

Chigwell and Loughton Broadway
Party	Candidate	Votes	%	±%
Conservative	John Knapman *	1,146	38.0	−15.2
UKIP	Lucy Bostick	982	32.6	N/A
Loughton Residents	Leon Girling	324	10.8	N/A
Labour	Margaret Owen	319	10.6	−3.3
Green	Christopher Lord	114	3.8	−5.5
Liberal Democrats	George Lund	93	3.1	−8.4
Independent	Robert Jarvis	37	1.2	N/A
Majority		164	5.4	−33.9
Turnout		3,015	22.3	−11.6
Conservative hold		Swing	−23.9	

Epping and Theydon Bois
Party	Candidate	Votes	%	±%
Liberal Democrats	Jon Whitehouse	1,664	37.9	−4.5
Conservative	Robert Glozier	1,273	29.0	−6.5
UKIP	Andrew Smith	1,073	24.4	+14.5
Labour	Simon Bullough	240	5.5	+2.2
Green	Barry Johns	145	3.3	−0.4
Majority		391	8.9	+2.1
Turnout		4,395	33.0	−12.9
Liberal Democrats hold		Swing	+1.0	

Loughton Central
Party	Candidate	Votes	%	±%
Loughton Residents	Chris Pond *	1,945	60.7	+5.5
UKIP	Reginald Ellis	615	19.2	+12.9
Conservative	Ivan Kovler	389	12.1	−6.1
Green	Nicola Fuller	109	3.4	+1.0
Independent	Paul Morris	73	2.3	N/A
Liberal Democrats	Maureen Jarvis	72	2.3	−0.1
Majority		1,330	41.5	+4.5
Turnout		3,203	23.1	−14.5
Loughton Residents hold		Swing	−3.7	

North Weald and Nazeing
Party	Candidate	Votes	%	±%
Conservative	Anthony Jackson *	1,669	47.6	−13.4
UKIP	Peter Field	1,170	33.4	N/A
Labour	David Mills	421	12.0	+3.8
Green	Nicola Barnecutt	164	4.7	−4.0
Liberal Democrats	Arnold Verrall	83	2.4	−7.9
Majority		499	14.2	−34.8
Turnout		3,507	24.7	−13.2
Conservative hold		Swing	−23.4	

Ongar and Rural
Party	Candidate	Votes	%	±%
Conservative	Maggie McEwen	1,475	51.0	−2.0
UKIP	Ronald Till	738	25.5	N/A
Labour	Peter Gode	271	9.4	+3.4
Liberal Democrats	Brian Surtees	185	6.4	−8.3
Green	Jem Barnecutt	132	4.6	−1.9
English Democrat	Robin Tilbrook	93	3.2	−8.1
Majority		737	25.5	−12.8
Turnout		2,894	24.3	−13.0
Conservative hold		Swing	−13.8	

Waltham Abbey
Party	Candidate	Votes	%	±%
Conservative	Ricki Gadsby	1,378	40.8	−9.8
UKIP	Rod Butler	1,221	36.1	N/A
Labour	Robert Greyson	505	14.9	+6.2
Liberal Democrats	Timothy Vaughan	100	3.0	−10.4
Green	Murray Sackwild	89	2.6	−3.7
BNP	Patricia Richardson	87	2.6	−18.5
Majority		157	4.6	−24.9
Turnout		3,380	20.5	−10.8
Conservative hold		Swing	−23.0	

=== Harlow ===
District Summary

Party	Seats	+/-	Votes	%	+/-
Labour	3	▲3	8,531	36.5	+10.4
Conservative	1	▼3	6,218	26.6	−8.7
UKIP	0	Steady	6,747	28.8	+28.8
Liberal Democrat	0	Steady	853	3.7	−13.9
Green	0	Steady	685	2.9	−3.7
TUSC	0	Steady	358	1.5	+1.5

Division Results

Harlow North
Party	Candidate	Votes	%	±%
Labour	Michael Danvers	1,637	37.0	+12.1
Conservative	Michael Garnett *	1,229	27.8	−5.4
UKIP	Bill Pryor	1,147	25.9	+25.9
Liberal Democrats	Mary Wiltshire	205	4.6	−15.8
Green	Howard Reed	115	2.6	−5.9
TUSC	Paul Lenihan	88	2.0	+2.0
Majority		408	9.2	+0.9
Turnout		4,421	26.6	−8.8
Labour gain from Conservative		Swing	+8.8	

Harlow South East
Party	Candidate	Votes	%	±%
Conservative	Edward Johnson *	1,346	32.5	−8.3
Labour	Daniella Pritchard	1,325	32.0	+11.5
UKIP	Mark Gough	1,254	30.3	+30.3
Liberal Democrats	Christopher Millington	131	3.2	−14.8
Green	Nicholas David Scales	82	2.0	−4.7
Majority		21	0.5	−19.8
Turnout		4,138	27.4	−5.1
Conservative hold		Swing	−9.9	

Harlow West (2)
Party	Candidate	Votes	%	±%
Labour	Karen Clempner	2,794	37.7	+9.2
Labour	Anthony Durcan *	2,775	37.4	+10.0
UKIP	Dan Long	2,207	29.8	N/A
UKIP	Jerry Crawford	2,139	28.8	N/A
Conservative	Linda Pailing	1,887	25.4	−10.8
Conservative	Clive Souter	1,756	23.7	–9.2
Green	Susan Ransome	291	3.9	−8.0
Liberal Democrats	Ian Jackson	276	3.7	−13.1
TUSC	David Brown	270	3.5	N/A
Liberal Democrats	Christopher Robins	241	3.2	–13.0
Green	Daniel Shadbolt	197	2.7	N/A
Turnout		14,833	23.8	−8.9
Labour gain from Conservative				
Labour gain from Conservative				

=== Maldon ===
District Summary

Party	Seats	+/-	Votes	%	+/-
Conservative	3	Steady	6,138	44.5	−6.3
UKIP	0	Steady	4,059	29.5	+29.5
Labour	0	Steady	2,039	14.8	+5.6
Green	0	Steady	1,163	8.4	−2.6
BNP	0	Steady	385	2.8	−6.0

Division Results

Heybridge and Tollesbury
Party	Candidate	Votes	%	±%
Conservative	Rodney Bass *	2,300	46.3	−7.6
UKIP	Beverley Acevedo	1,202	24.2	N/A
Labour	Stevan Slodzik	822	16.5	+8.9
Green	Robert Graves	417	8.4	−4.6
BNP	Richard Perry	230	4.6	−4.8
Majority		1,098	22.1	−15.8
Turnout		4,971	31.1	−8.5
Conservative hold		Swing	−15.9	

Maldon
Party	Candidate	Votes	%	±%
Conservative	Penny Channer *	1,994	47.7	+6.1
UKIP	Geoffrey Dickman	1,052	25.2	N/A
Labour	Madeline Diamond	574	13.7	+4.7
Green	Janet Carden	470	11.3	+0.7
BNP	Mark Burmby	87	2.1	−4.8
Majority		942	22.6	+1.7
Turnout		4,177	28.7	−10.5
Conservative hold		Swing	−9.5	

Southminster
Party	Candidate	Votes	%	±%
Conservative	Robert Boyce *	1,844	39.8	−5.1
UKIP	Tim Drain	1,805	38.9	+17.1
Labour	Leslie Allan McDonald	643	13.9	+5.1
Green	Jonathan King	276	6.0	−1.0
BNP	Nathan Stone	68	1.5	−6.3
Majority		39	0.8	−22.1
Turnout		4,636	26.2	−9.6
Conservative hold		Swing	−11.1	

=== Rochford ===
District Summary

Party	Seats	+/-	Votes	%	+/-
Conservative	3	▼2	6,360	34.9	−14.2
UKIP	1	▲1	5,127	28.2	+26.4
Green	1	▲1	1,615	8.9	+4.1
Labour	0	Steady	2,384	13.1	+5.5
Liberal Democrat	0	Steady	2,059	8.9	−7.3
English Democrat	0	Steady	660	3.6	−2.9

Division Results

Rayleigh North
Party	Candidate	Votes	%	±%
Conservative	Malcolm Maddocks	1,332	32.4	−5.9
Liberal Democrats	Christopher Black	1,037	25.2	−6.6
UKIP	Janet Davies	830	20.2	+12.6
English Democrat	John Hayter	660	16.0	+2.9
Labour	David Bodimeade	258	6.3	+2.1
Majority		295	7.2	+0.7
Turnout		4,117	31.0	−10.8
Conservative hold		Swing	+0.3	

Rayleigh South
Party	Candidate	Votes	%	±%
UKIP	Keith Gibbs	1,379	39.8	+39.8
Conservative	John Flack	1,194	34.4	−14.5
Liberal Democrats	Pam Waldie	563	16.2	−1.3
Labour	Cameron Scott	331	9.6	+3.0
Majority		185	5.3	−24.4
Turnout		3,467	26.8	−8.6
UKIP gain from Conservative		Swing	+27.1	

Rochford North
Party	Candidate	Votes	%	±%
Conservative	Terry Cutmore	1,470	42.6	−9.0
UKIP	Gerry Bolton	1,236	35.9	+35.9
Labour	Allan Davies	446	12.9	+6.1
Liberal Democrats	Deborah Taylor	296	8.6	−5.5
Majority		234	6.8	−30.2
Turnout		3,448	26.1	−11.3
Conservative hold		Swing	−22.4	

Rochford South
Party	Candidate	Votes	%	±%
Conservative	Colin Seagers	1,085	36.4	−14.7
Labour	Jerry Gibson	1,005	33.7	+21.1
UKIP	Peter Van De Vyver	804	27.0	+27.0
Liberal Democrats	Angela Robinson	89	3.0	−6.1
Majority		80	2.7	−34.4
Turnout		2,983	24.0	−8.2
Conservative hold		Swing	−17.9	

Rochford West
Party	Candidate	Votes	%	±%
Green	Michael Hoy	1,615	38.5	+38.5
Conservative	Keith Hudson	1,279	30.5	−26.3
UKIP	Cherry Young	878	21.0	+21.0
Labour	Rachael Broomfield	344	8.2	−1.1
Liberal Democrats	Ian Gale	74	1.8	−15.4
Majority		336	8.0	−31.6
Turnout		4,190	29.8	−8.4
Green gain from Conservative		Swing	+32.4	

=== Tendring ===
District Summary

Party	Seats	+/-	Votes	%	+/-
Conservative	4	▼4	10,310	30.8	−10.0
UKIP	2	▲2	9,774	29.2	+27.1
Labour	1	▲1	5,545	16.6	+5.4
Tendring First	1	▲1	4,093	12.2	−1.8
Liberal Democrat	0	Steady	2,661	8.0	−3.5
Green	0	Steady	1,066	3.2	−3.9
CRP	0	Steady	204	0.6	−3.1
Independent	0	Steady	128	0.4	+0.4

Division Results

Brightlingsea
Party	Candidate	Votes	%	±%
UKIP	Roger Lord	1,429	30.4	+30.4
Liberal Democrats	Gary Scott	1,264	26.9	−1.5
Conservative	Lynda M^{c}Williams	1,156	24.6	−18.4
Labour	Colin Olivier	585	12.4	+1.9
Green	Maria Iacovou	165	3.5	−4.9
Tendring First	Terry Allen	102	2.2	N/A
Majority		165	3.5	−11.1
Turnout		4,701	32.2	−6.8
UKIP gain from Conservative		Swing	+24.4	

Clacton East
Party	Candidate	Votes	%	±%
Tendring First	Pierre Oxley	1,528	34.3	+8.8
Conservative	Peter Halliday	1,194	26.8	−15.8
UKIP	Sandy White	1,106	24.8	+24.8
Labour	Norman Jacobs	477	10.7	+1.2
Liberal Democrats	Brian Whitson	77	1.7	−2.7
Green	Eleanor Mary Gordon	70	1.6	−4.5
Majority		621	7.5	−9.6
Turnout		4,452	33.7	−7.0
Tendring First gain from Conservative		Swing	+12.3	

Clacton North
Party	Candidate	Votes	%	±%
Conservative	Andy Wood	929	29.3	−10.5
Labour	Sam Atkinson	790	24.9	+8.4
UKIP	Anne Poonian	789	24.9	N/A
Tendring First	Mark Stephenson	396	12.5	N/A
Liberal Democrats	Harry Shearing	191	6.0	−13.9
Green	James Horsler	75	2.4	−4.8
Majority		139	4.4	−15.6
Turnout		3,170	24.2	−7.2
Conservative hold		Swing	−9.5	

Clacton West
Party	Candidate	Votes	%	±%
Conservative	Paul Honeywood	1,251	38.2	−1.8
UKIP	Chris Cotter	1031	31.4	N/A
Labour	Linda Jacobs	671	20.5	+9.0
Tendring First	Christopher Keston	158	4.8	−12.1
Liberal Democrats	Ann Whitson	85	2.6	−5.9
Green	Clare Palmer	83	2.5	−2.9
Majority		220	6.7	−16.3
Turnout		3,279	27.1	−8.4
Conservative hold		Swing	−16.6	

Frinton and Walton
Party	Candidate	Votes	%	±%
Conservative	Michael Page *	2,095	37.7	−8.4
UKIP	Simon Ashley	1,588	28.6	N/A
Tendring First	Iris Johnson	1,085	19.5	−12.8
Labour	Rose Lawes	619	11.2	+4.0
Green	Howard Mettler	84	1.5	−5.7
Liberal Democrats	Jo Hayes	81	1.5	N/A
Majority		507	9.1	−4.7
Turnout		5,552	35.7	−9.9
Conservative hold		Swing	−18.5	

Harwich
Party	Candidate	Votes	%	±%
Labour	Ivan Henderson	1,722	41.2	+20.3
UKIP	John Brown	1,138	27.2	N/A
Conservative	Ricky Callender *	892	21.3	−15.2
Community Rep.	Steven Henderson	204	4.9	−18.4
Liberal Democrats	Simon Banks	135	3.2	−3.1
Green	Robbie Spence	70	1.7	−4.5
Tendring First	Jack Robertson	23	0.6	N/A
Majority		584	14.0	+0.8
Turnout		4,184	31.1	−5.9
Labour gain from Conservative		Swing	+17.8	

Tendring Rural East
Party	Candidate	Votes	%	±%
UKIP	Andrew Erskine	1,552	35.0	+35.0
Conservative	Michael Skeels *	1,278	28.8	−6.9
Labour	Mark Morley-Souter	681	15.3	+4.8
Tendring First	Mark Cossens	654	14.7	−7.9
Green	Chris Southall	176	4.0	−4.0
Liberal Democrats	Dennis Cook	100	2.3	−7.2
Majority		274	6.2	−6.9
Turnout		4,441	30.1	−8.6
UKIP gain from Conservative		Swing	+20.9	

Tendring Rural West
Party	Candidate	Votes	%	±%
Conservative	Carlo Guglielmi	1,515	37.9	−2.9
UKIP	Dennis Carr	1,141	28.5	+12.0
Liberal Democrats	Rosemary Smith	728	18.2	−0.1
Green	Duncan Gordon	343	8.6	+0.5
Tendring First	David Oxley	147	3.7	−1.7
Independent	Jim Clifton	128	3.2	N/A
Majority		374	9.3	−13.2
Turnout		4,002	29.5	−11.3
Conservative hold		Swing	−7.4	

=== Uttlesford ===
District Summary

Party	Seats	+/-	Votes	%	+/-
Conservative	3	▼1	8,858	42.7	−11.8
Independent	1	▲1	2,079	10.0	+10.0
UKIP	0	Steady	3,741	18.0	+15.9
Liberal Democrat	0	Steady	3,447	16.6	−8.8
Labour	0	Steady	1,710	8.2	+4.8
Green	0	Steady	922	4.4	−6.5

Division Results

Dunmow
Party	Candidate	Votes	%	±%
Conservative	Susan Barker *	2,661	52.4	−8.5
UKIP	Alan Stannard	1,298	25.5	N/A
Labour	Terry Brandon	482	9.5	+3.2
Liberal Democrats	David Morgan	398	7.8	−6.8
Green	Karmel Stannard	244	4.8	−5.4
Majority		1,363	26.8	−19.5
Turnout		5,083	27.8	−10.5
Conservative hold		Swing	−17.0	

Saffron Walden
Party	Candidate	Votes	%	±%
Independent	John Lodge	2,079	34.3	N/A
Conservative	Robert Chambers *	2,031	33.5	−17.1
UKIP	Barry Tyler	609	10.10	N/A
Liberal Democrats	Richard Freeman	607	10.0	−13.2
Labour	Jane Berney	491	8.1	+0.7
Green	Trilby Roberts	244	4.0	−9.7
Majority		48	0.8	−26.6
Turnout		6,061	37.7	−4.6
Independent gain from Conservative		Swing	+25.7	

Stansted
Party	Candidate	Votes	%	±%
Conservative	Raymond Gooding *	2,262	40.7	−2.9
Liberal Democrats	Geoffrey Sell	1,766	31.8	−10.3
UKIP	Peter Barclay	944	17.0	N/A
Labour	Ian Davies	402	7.2	+4.1
Green	Martin Wybrew	186	3.4	−3.3
Majority		496	8.9	+7.4
Turnout		5,560	37.4	−9.3
Conservative hold		Swing	+3.7	

Thaxted
Party	Candidate	Votes	%	±%
Conservative	Simon Walsh *	1,904	47.0	−9.0
UKIP	Stuart Moore	890	22.0	N/A
Liberal Democrats	Antoinette Wattebot	676	16.7	−0.8
Labour	Barbara Light	335	8.3	+4.1
Green	John Dunkley	248	6.1	−5.5
Majority		1,014	25.0	−13.5
Turnout		4,053	29.0	−12.3
Conservative hold		Swing	−15.5	

== By-elections ==
=== Summary ===
By-election	Date	Incumbent party	Winning party
Brightlingsea	9 October 2014	UKIP	Conservative
Bocking	5 March 2015	UKIP	Conservative
Clacton East	31 March 2016	Tendring First	Holland Residents
Laindon Park and Fryerns	9 June 2016	Labour	UKIP

=== Results ===
Brightlingsea

Brightlingsea: 9 October 2014
Party	Candidate	Votes	%	±%
Conservative	Alan Goggin	1,809	33.7	+9.1
UKIP	Anne Poonian	1,642	30.6	+0.2
Liberal Democrats	Gary Scott	1,199	22.3	−4.6
Labour	Carol Carlsson-Browne	524	9.8	−2.7
Green	Beverley Maltby	200	3.7	+0.2
Majority		167	3.1	−0.4
Turnout		5,398	36.5	+4.3
Conservative gain from UKIP		Swing	+4.5	

Bocking

Bocking: 5 March 2015
Party	Candidate	Votes	%	±%
Conservative	Stephen Canning	1,071	34.3	+2.1
Labour	Lynn Watson	974	31.2	+1.3
UKIP	Michael Ford	855	27.4	−5.3
Green	John Malam	165	5.3	+2.2
Independent	Walter Sale	58	1.9	New
Majority		97	3.1	N/A
Turnout		3,123		
Conservative gain from UKIP		Swing		

Laindon Park and Fryerns

Laindon Park and Fryerns: 9 June 2016
Party	Candidate	Votes	%	±%
UKIP	Frank Ferguson	2,034	42.6	+9.2
Labour	Lynn Watson	1,600	33.5	−7.4
Conservative	Gary Maylin	878	18.4	+2.4
Green	Phillip Rackley	264	5.5	+3.1
Majority		434	9.1	N/A
Turnout		4,776		
UKIP gain from Labour		Swing		

Clacton East

Clacton East: 31 March 2016
Party	Candidate	Votes	%	±%
Holland Residents	Colin Sargeant	1,781	46.8	New
UKIP	Benjamin Smith	961	25.3	+0.5
Conservative	Richard Bleach	628	16.5	−10.3
Labour	Christopher Bird	387	10.2	−0.5
Liberal Democrats	Rain Welham-Cobb	49	1.3	−0.4
Majority		820	21.5	N/A
Turnout		3,806		
Holland Residents gain from Tendring First		Swing		
