= 2012 Epping Forest District Council election =

2012 UK local government election

- 3 May 2012

23 of 58 seats to Epping Forest District Council 30 seats needed for a majority
- Turnout: 30.0% (▼9.0%)
	First party	Second party	Third party
Leader	Lesley Wagland	Caroline Pond	Jon Whitehouse
Party	Conservative	Loughton Residents	Liberal Democrats
Leader's seat	Chigwell Village	Loughton St. John's	Epping Hemnall
Last election	37 seats, 57.0%	N/A	6 seats, 18.0%
Seats before	37	10	6
Seats won	39	12	4
Seat change	▲2	▲2	▼2
Popular vote	9,610	3,978	2,903
Percentage	43.7%	18.1%	13.2%
Swing	▼12.9%	N/A	▼4.8%
	Fourth party	Fifth party	Sixth party
Leader	N/A	Peter Gode	Patricia Richardson
Party	Independent	Labour	BNP
Leader's seat	N/A	Shelley	Loughton Broadway
Last election	3 seats, 4.1%	1 seat, 9.0%	1 seat, N/A
Seats before	3	1	1
Seats won	2	1	0
Seat change	▼1	Steady	▼1
Popular vote	652	3,133	150
Percentage	3.0%	13.2%	0.7%
Swing	▼1.1%	▲4.3%	N/A
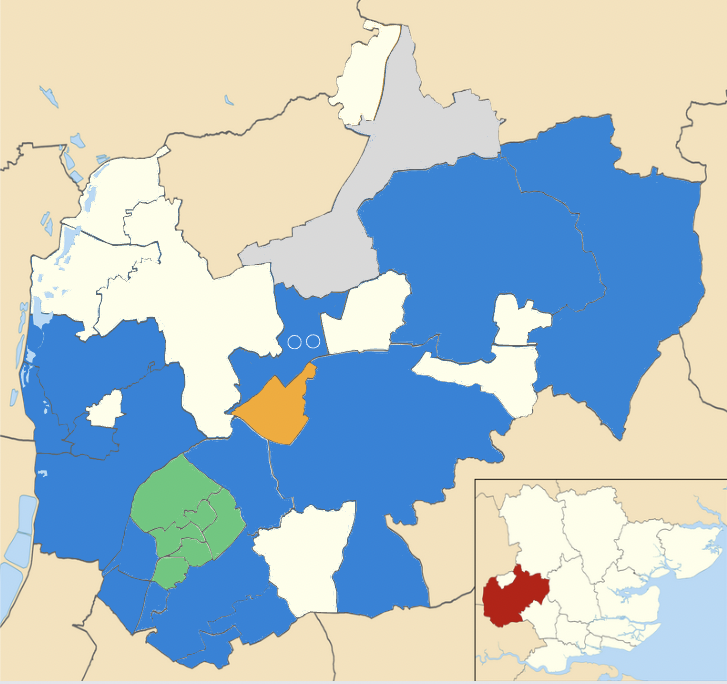
- Results of the 2012 District Council elections

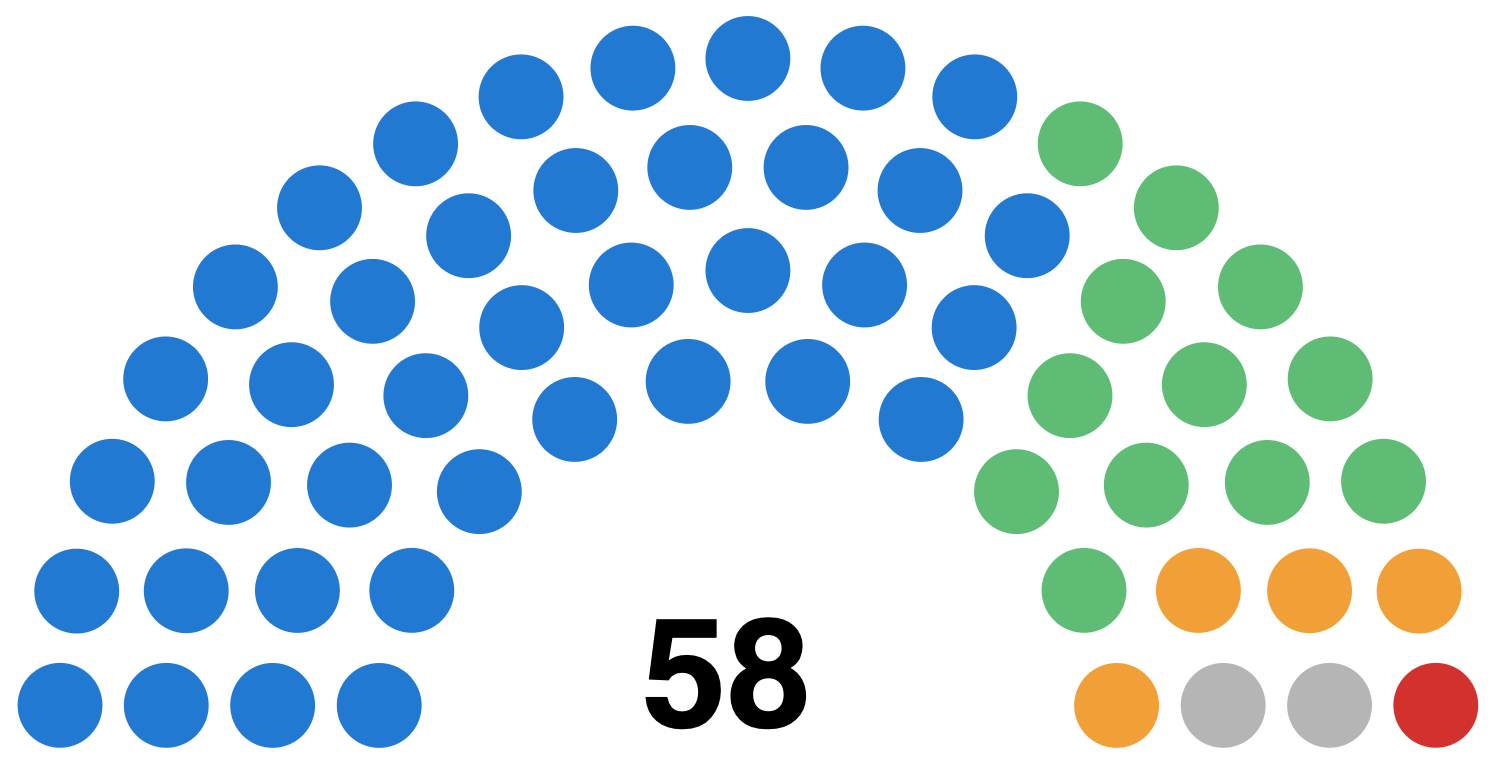
- Council composition following the election
Council control before election
Conservative
Council control after election
Conservative

The 2012 Epping Forest Council election took place on 3 May 2012 to elect members of Epping Forest Council in England. This was on same day as other 2012 United Kingdom local elections.

One-third of council were up for election. No elections were held this year in Broadley Common, Epping Upland and Nazeing, Chipping Ongar, Greensted and Marden Ash, Lambourne, Lower Nazeing, Lower Sheering, North Weald Bassett, Roydon, Shelley, Waltham Abbey High Beach or Waltham Abbey Paternoster.

This is the last time a British National Party councillor has sat in the chamber following Pat Richardson's defeat in Loughton Broadway to the Loughton Residents Association. Former British National Party councillor, Julian Leppert (who represented Hainault on Redbridge Borough Council) won a seat in 2019 in Waltham Abbey as a candidate for For Britain.

== Boundary changes ==
There was an extra election this year in Hastingwood, Matching and Sheering Village ward following changes to the boundaries of Matching parish, which annexed part of Moreton and Fyfield ward. The Hastingwood, Matching and Sheering Village councillor was elected for a three-year term only.

== Buckhurst Hill East ==
Buckhurst Hill East
Party	Candidate	Votes	%	±%
Conservative	Neville Wright	488	42.6	+0.5
Liberal Democrats	Dev Dodeja	251	21.8	−28.1
Green	Leonard Martin	207	18.0	−10.1
Labour	Andrew Forsey	199	17.3	N/A
Majority		237	20.6	
Turnout		1,145	33.0	−33.0
Conservative gain from Liberal Democrats		Swing		

== Buckhurst Hill West ==
Buckhurst Hill West
Party	Candidate	Votes	%	±%
Conservative	Gavin Chambers	765	46.9	−3.7
Liberal Democrats	Sarah Hannah Unwin	504	30.9	−2.2
UKIP	Gerard Wadsworth	134	8.2	+1.5
Labour	Ben Spencer	129	7.9	N/A
Green	Steven Neville	99	6.0	−0.8
Majority		261	16.0	−1.4
Turnout		1,631	31.0	−15.0
Conservative gain from Liberal Democrats		Swing		

== Chigwell Row ==
Chigwell Row
Party	Candidate	Votes	%	±%
Conservative	Brian Sandler	399	72.1	−8.4
Labour	Shaheen Hosseinpour	64	11.5	N/A
Green	Alison Mary Garnham	60	10.8	+5.2
Liberal Democrats	Sarah Hannah Unwin	30	5.4	−8.5
Majority		335	60.5	−6.1
Turnout		553	30.0	
Conservative hold		Swing		

== Chigwell Village ==
Chigwell Village
Party	Candidate	Votes	%	±%
Conservative	John Knapman	587	63.7	−8.4
UKIP	Lucy Bostick	173	18.7	N/A
Labour	Alexander Kite	93	10.0	N/A
Green	Chris Lord	46	4.9	−3.1
Liberal Democrats	George Lund	22	2.3	−17.7
Majority		414	45.0	−7.2
Turnout		921	28.0	−40.0
Conservative hold		Swing		

== Epping Hemnall ==
Epping Hemnall
Party	Candidate	Votes	%	±%
Liberal Democrats	Jon Whitehouse	883	57.0	+10.5
Conservative	Janet Hedges	482	31.1	−7.3
Labour	Lorraine Collier	182	11.7	+5.1
Majority		401	25.9	+17.9
Turnout		1,547	36.0	−36.0
Liberal Democrats hold		Swing		

== Epping Lindsey and Thornwood Common ==
Epping Lindsey and Thornwood Common
Party	Candidate	Votes	%	±%
Conservative	Tony Church	957	29.9	−19.4
Conservative	Chris Whitbread	907	28.3	N/A
Labour	Steven Harding	486	15.1	−5.2
Labour	Scott Lister	417	13.0	N/A
Green	Barry Johns	166	5.1	+1.3
Liberal Democrats	Lynne Hughes	153	4.7	−32.1
Liberal Democrats	Simon Hughes	112	3.5	N/A
Majority		50	1.5	−10.9
Turnout		3,198	34.0	−37.0
Conservative hold		Swing		
Conservative hold		Swing		

== Grange Hill ==
Grange Hill
Party	Candidate	Votes	%	±%
Conservative	Alan Lion	770	61.0	+6.4
Labour	Tal Ofer	280	22.1	N/A
Liberal Democrats	Lynne Hughes	212	17.0	−21.1
Majority		490	39.4	+20.3
Turnout		1,242	25.0	−38.0
Conservative hold		Swing		

== Hastingwood, Matching and Sheering Village ==
Hastingwood, Matching and Sheering Village
Party	Candidate	Votes	%	±%
Independent	Richard Morgan	538	86.7	+0.7
Labour	Laurence Morter	82	13.2	N/A
Majority		456	73.5	−1.3
Turnout		620	34.0	+11.0
Independent hold		Swing		

== High Ongar, Willingale and the Rodings ==
High Ongar, Willingale and the Rodings
Party	Candidate	Votes	%	±%
Conservative	Maggie McEwan	345	70.4	−6.1
English Democrat	Robin Charles William Tillbrook	63	12.8	+2.8
Labour	Lewis Alfred Montlake	51	10.4	N/A
Green	Jeremy Nicholas Barnecutt	31	6.3	+1.4
Majority		282	57.5	−9.0
Turnout		490	27.5	
Conservative hold		Swing		

== Loughton Alderton ==
Loughton Alderton
Party	Candidate	Votes	%	±%
Loughton Residents	Tracey Thomas	513	57.1	+9.1
Conservative	Roger Taylor	135	15.0	−3.7
Labour	Angela Ayre	127	14.1	+2.9
Independent	Paul Morris	88	9.7	N/A
Green	Ben Wille	25	2.7	N/A
Liberal Democrats	B A Patel	10	1.1	−5.2
Majority		378	42.0	−12.8
Turnout		898	26.0	−37.0
Loughton Residents hold		Swing		

== Loughton Broadway ==
Loughton Broadway
Party	Candidate	Votes	%	±%
Loughton Residents	Leon Girling	424	51.2	+18.3
Labour	Simon David Bullough	174	21.0	+0.2
Conservative	Neal Bagshaw	110	13.2	−6.0
BNP	Patricia Richardson	94	11.3	−6.2
Independent	Raymond Robert Harris	26	3.1	N/A
Majority		250	30.1	+18.0
Turnout		828	25.0	−32.0
Loughton Residents gain from BNP		Swing		

== Loughton Fairmead ==
Loughton Fairmead
Party	Candidate	Votes	%	±%
Loughton Residents	David Wixley	428	53.9	+15.2
Labour	Stephen William Barnes	155	19.5	+7.7
Conservative	Iqbal Singh Kalkat	114	14.3	−10.1
English Democrat	Edward Mark Butler	97	12.2	N/A
Majority		273	34.3	−20.0
Turnout		794	23.7	−35.3
Loughton Residents hold		Swing		

== Loughton Forest ==
Loughton Forest
Party	Candidate	Votes	%	±%
Conservative	James Hart	654	50.0	+7.2
Loughton Residents	Rose Brookes	575	43.9	+0.1
Labour	Margaret Owen	57	4.3	N/A
Liberal Democrats	Peter Sinfield	21	1.6	−8.7
Majority		79	6.0	+5.1
Turnout		1,307	38.0	−36.0
Conservative hold		Swing		

== Loughton Roding ==
Loughton Roding
Party	Candidate	Votes	%	±%
Loughton Residents	Ken Angold-Stephens	737	63.4	N/A
Conservative	Keith Buckley	246	21.1	+5.9
Labour	Deborah Wild	179	15.4	N/A
Majority		491	42.2	−13.0
Turnout		1,162	33.0	−36.0
Loughton Residents hold		Swing		

== Loughton St. John's ==
Loughton St. John's
Party	Candidate	Votes	%	±%
Loughton Residents	Caroline Pond	700	62.3	+9.3
Conservative	Pat Reynolds	298	26.5	−5.0
Labour	Jill Bostock	85	7.5	+1.0
Green	James Coombes	39	3.4	+1.2
Majority		402	35.8	+14.3
Turnout		1,122	33.0	−39.0
Loughton Residents hold		Swing		

== Loughton St. Mary's ==
Loughton St. Mary's
Party	Candidate	Votes	%	±%
Loughton Residents	Harvey Mann	601	50.0	−4.1
Conservative	Rodney Barrett	459	38.2	−4.3
Labour	Michael Finan	84	7.0	N/A
BNP	Thomas Richardson	56	4.6	N/A
Majority		142	11.8	−8.3
Turnout		1,200	33.0	−35.0
Loughton Residents hold		Swing		

== Moreton and Fyfield ==
Moreton and Fyfield
Party	Candidate	Votes	%	±%
Conservative	Tony Boyce	343	75.7	−0.3
Green	Nicola Harries	42	9.2	N/A
Liberal Democrats	Ingrid Black	35	7.7	−35.7
Labour	Alison Wingfield	33	7.2	N/A
Majority		301	66.4	+64.9
Turnout		453	29.0	
Conservative hold		Swing		

== Passingford ==
Passingford
Party	Candidate	Votes	%	±%
Conservative	Heather Brady	402	84.8	−4.3
Liberal Democrats	Brian Surtees	44	9.2	−1.7
Labour	Louis Appiah	28	5.9	N/A
Majority		358	75.5	Steady
Turnout		474	26.0	
Conservative hold		Swing		

== Theydon Bois ==
Theydon Bois
Party	Candidate	Votes	%	±%
Conservative	John Philip	581	44.9	−6.7
Liberal Democrats	Roland Frankel	528	40.8	−3.5
UKIP	Mick McGough	117	9.0	N/A
Labour	Martin Lawford	49	3.7	N/A
Green	Daniel Kieve	17	1.3	−2.6
Majority		53	4.1	−3.2
Turnout		1,292	39.0	−35.0
Conservative hold		Swing		

== Waltham Abbey Honey Lane ==
Waltham Abbey Honey Lane
Party	Candidate	Votes	%	±%
Conservative	Glynis Shiell	588	63.1	−2.5
Labour	Robert Greyson	278	29.8	+10.5
Liberal Democrats	Arnold Verrall	65	6.9	−0.8
Majority		310	33.2	−13.1
Turnout		931	20.0	−11.0
Conservative hold		Swing		

== Waltham Abbey North East ==
Waltham Abbey North East
Party	Candidate	Votes	%	±%
Conservative	Jeane Lea	514	76.4	23.3
Labour	Kelvin Morris	158	23.5	N/A
Majority		356	52.9	+37.8
Turnout		672	24.0	−14.0
Conservative hold		Swing		

== Waltham Abbey South West ==
Waltham Abbey South West
Party	Candidate	Votes	%	±%
Conservative	Helen Kane	373	63.0	−4.1
Labour	John Game	160	27.0	N/A
Liberal Democrats	Patricia Brooks	59	9.9	−2.5
Majority		213	35.9	−10.8
Turnout		592	19.0	−10.0
Conservative hold		Swing		
