= 2004 Epping Forest District Council election =

2004 UK local government election

- 10 June 2004

21 of 58 seats on Epping Forest District Council 30 seats needed for a majority
- Turnout: 37.6% (▲8.3%)

	First party	Second party	Third party
Leader	Maggie McEwen	Michael Heavens	Dorothy Paddon
Party	Conservative	Liberal Democrats	Loughton Residents
Leader's seat	High Ongar, Willingale & the Rodings	Buckhurst Hill West	Loughton St. Mary's
Last election	23 seats, 52.8%	16 seats, 32.8%	6 seats, N/A
Seats before	24	15	6
Seats won	26	14	6
Seat change	▲3	▼2	Steady
Popular vote	12,612	9,073	3,788
Percentage	42.7%	30.8%	12.8%
Swing	▼10.1%	▼2.0%	N/A
	Fourth party	Fifth party	Sixth party
Leader	N/A	Joan Davis	Patricia Richardson
Party	Independent inc. CRA	Labour	BNP
Leader's seat	N/A	Loughton Broadway	Loughton Fairmead
Last election	4 seats, 6.8%	9 seats, 5.5%	0 seats, N/A
Seats before	5	8	0
Seats won	5 (Note: Daphne Borton (Nazeing), Reg Chidley (Waltham Abbey Paternoster), John Knapman (CRA - Chigwell Village), Richard Morgan (Hastingwood, Matching and Sheering Village), and Stephen Murray (Loughton Roding))	4	3
Seat change	▲1	▼5	▲3
Popular vote	N/A	1,360	1,109
Percentage	N/A	4.6%	3.8%
Swing	N/A	▼0.9%	N/A
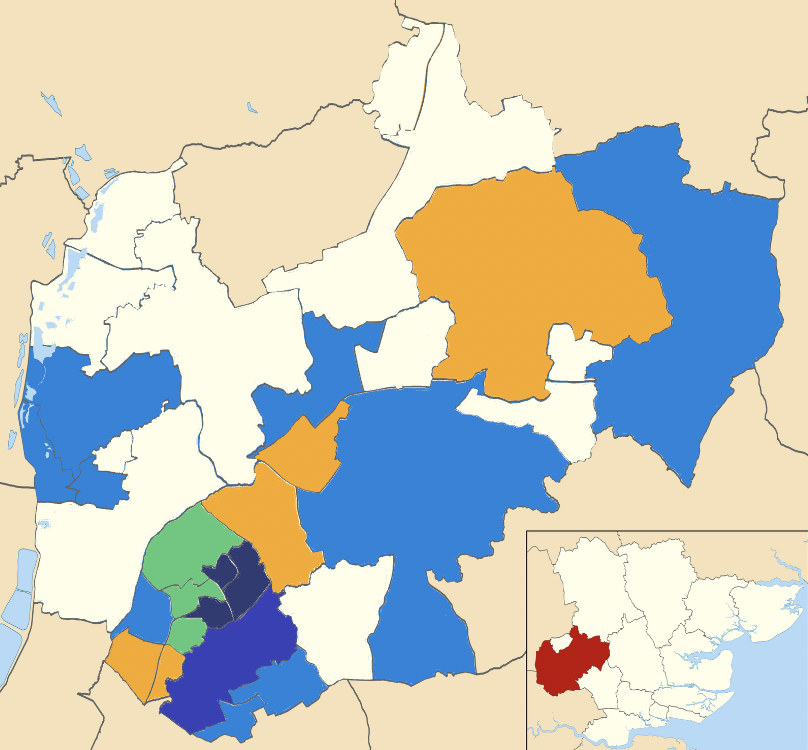
- Results of the 2004 District Council elections

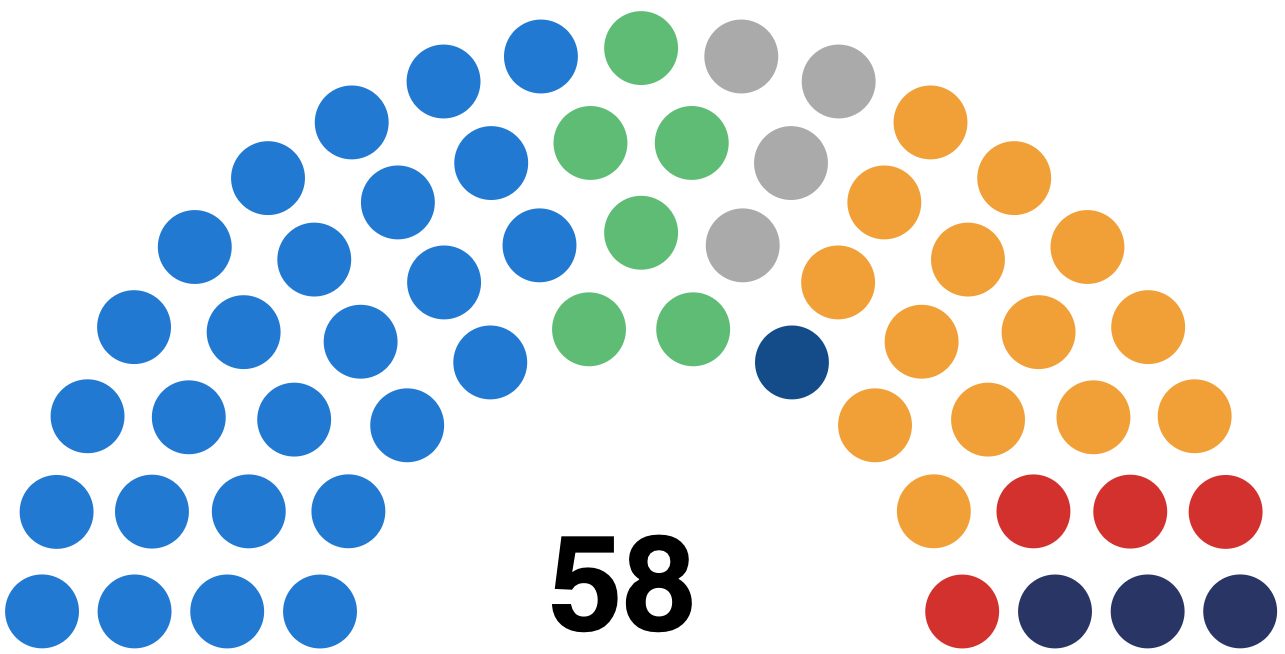
- Council composition following the election
Council control before election
No overall control
Conservative largest party
Council control after election
No overall control
Conservative largest party

Elections to Epping Forest Council were held on 10 June 2004. One third of the council was up for election and the council stayed under no overall control. Overall turnout was 37.6%.

This election saw the British National Party first enter the council chamber. They would go on to double their representation. This also saw the largest loss of Labour seats since they were the council's largest party in 1998.

== Ward results ==
=== Buckhurst Hill East ===
Buckhurst Hill East
Party	Candidate	Votes	%	±%
Liberal Democrats	Malcolm Woollard	699	52.6	▼1.5
Conservative	Alan Kilbey	450	33.9	▲0.5
BNP	Peter Turpin	179	13.5	N/A
Majority		249	18.7	▼2.0
Turnout		1,328	41.3	▲5.2
Liberal Democrats hold		Swing		

=== Buckhurst Hill West ===
Buckhurst Hill West
Party	Candidate	Votes	%	±%
Liberal Democrats	Michael Heavens	1,049	51.7	▼4.1
Conservative	Haluk Ulkun	981	48.3	▲4.1
Majority		68	3.4	▼8.2
Turnout		2,030	41.2	▲11.6
Liberal Democrats hold		Swing		

=== Chigwell Row ===
Chigwell Row
Party	Candidate	Votes	%	±%
Conservative	Brian Sandler	460	59.4	▲8.9
Liberal Democrats	Margaret Heavens	315	40.6	▼8.9
Majority		145	18.8	▲17.8
Turnout		775	47.5	▲9.9
Conservative hold		Swing		

=== Chigwell Village ===
Chigwell Village
Party	Candidate	Votes	%	±%
Chigwell Residents Association	John Knapman	460	59.4	▲17.7
Liberal Democrats	Jeffrey Stollar	178	15.8	▲5.3
Majority		771	68.4	▲36.8
Turnout		1,127	37.9	▲6.4
Chigwell Residents Association hold		Swing		

=== Epping Hemnall ===
Epping Hemnall (2)
Party	Candidate	Votes	%	±%
Liberal Democrats	Jonathan Whitehouse	916	44.8	▼4.3
Conservative	Susan Perry	880	43.1	▼0.6
Liberal Democrats	Janet Hedges	873		
Conservative	Terence Spencer	806		
English Democrat	Clare Crawford	247	12.1	N/A
Turnout		3,722	42.0	▲12.9
Liberal Democrats hold		Swing		
Conservative gain from Liberal Democrats		Swing		

=== Epping Lindsey and Thornwood Common ===
Epping Lindsey and Thornwood Common
Party	Candidate	Votes	%	±%
Conservative	Christopher Whitbread	1,135	61.7	▲14.0
Liberal Democrats	Ingrid Black	455	24.7	▼12.8
Green	Robert Jones	249	13.5	▲6.0
Majority		680	37.0	▲26.8
Turnout		1,839	40.5	▲5.2
Conservative hold		Swing		

=== Grange Hill ===
Grange Hill
Party	Candidate	Votes	%	±%
Conservative	David Bateman	977	53.9	▲14.1
Liberal Democrats	Alan Lion	835	46.1	▼14.1
Majority		142	7.8	▼20.5
Turnout		1,812	38.9	▲10.6
Conservative hold		Swing		

=== High Ongar, Willingale and The Rodings ===
High Ongar, Willingale and The Rodings
Party	Candidate	Votes	%	±%
Conservative	Margaret McEwen	477	71.6	▼2.4
Liberal Democrats	Susan Miller	189	28.4	▲2.4
Majority		288	43.2	▼4.8
Turnout		666	40.7	▲6.5
Conservative hold		Swing		

=== Loughton Alderton ===
Loughton Alderton
Party	Candidate	Votes	%	±%
BNP	Terence Farr	315	28.0	N/A
Loughton Residents	Rosemary Brookes	258	22.9	N/A
Conservative	Matthew Daniel	251	22.3	▼15.2
Labour	Peter Sheen	223	19.8	▼29.2
Liberal Democrats	James Cuming	80	7.1	▼6.5
Majority		57	5.1	▼6.4
Turnout		1,127	34.6	▲10.8
BNP gain from Labour		Swing		

=== Loughton Broadway ===
Loughton Broadway
Party	Candidate	Votes	%	±%
BNP	Thomas Richardson	357	33.6	N/A
Labour	Margaret Owen	289	27.2	▼19.9
Conservative	Lorne Daniel	259	24.4	▲0.3
Liberal Democrats	Christopher Spence	158	14.9	▲1.7
Majority		68	6.4	▼16.8
Turnout		1,063	35.8	▲9.3
BNP gain from Labour		Swing		

=== Loughton Fairmead ===
Loughton Fairmead
Party	Candidate	Votes	%	±%
BNP	Patricia Richardson	258	26.6	N/A
Loughton Residents	Chris Pond	245	25.3	N/A
Labour	Albert Farren	209	21.6	▼34.4
Conservative	Gagan Mohindra	171	17.6	▼26.4
Liberal Democrats	Neil Woolcott	86	8.9	N/A
Majority		13	1.3	▼10.6
Turnout		969	31.4	▲10.9
BNP gain from Labour		Swing		

=== Loughton Forest ===
Loughton Forest
Party	Candidate	Votes	%	±%
Conservative	James Hart	670	48.0	▲9.0
Loughton Residents	Peter House	518	37.1	▼8.0
Labour	Thomas Owen	141	10.1	▼0.4
Liberal Democrats	Peter Sinfield	68	4.9	▼0.4
Majority		152	10.9	▲4.9
Turnout		1,397	44.3	▲6.3
Conservative gain from Loughton Residents		Swing		

=== Loughton Roding ===
Loughton Roding
Party	Candidate	Votes	%	±%
Loughton Residents	Kenneth Angold-Stephens	665	53.0	N/A
Conservative	Gaurav Mohindra	231	18.4	▼10.0
Labour	Paul Bostock	184	14.7	▼43.5
Liberal Democrats	Peter Spencer	175	13.9	▲0.5
Majority		434	44.6	▲14.8
Turnout		1,255	38.2	▼0.7
Loughton Residents gain from Labour		Swing		

=== Loughton St. John's ===
Loughton St. John's
Party	Candidate	Votes	%	±%
Loughton Residents	Caroline Pond	681	53.0	▲0.2
Conservative	Anthony Barritt	441	34.3	▲1.6
Labour	Jill Bostock	94	7.3	▼2.5
Liberal Democrats	Enid Robinson	68	5.3	▲1.5
Majority		240	18.7	▼1.4
Turnout		1,284	40.2	▲7.7
Loughton Residents hold		Swing		

=== Loughton St. Mary's ===
Loughton St. Mary's (2)
Party	Candidate	Votes	%	±%
Loughton Residents	Anthony Lee	734	55.3	▼1.2
Loughton Residents	Mitchell Cohen	687		
Conservative	Andrea Stephenson	383	28.9	▲0.6
Labour	Marion Taylor	112	8.4	▼2.2
Labour	John McNamara	108		
Liberal Democrats	Lucille Thompson	98	7.4	▲2.8
Turnout		2,122	39.5	▲7.3
Loughton Residents hold		Swing		
Loughton Residents hold		Swing		

=== Moreton and Fyfield ===
Moreton and Fyfield
Party	Candidate	Votes	%	±%
Liberal Democrats	Douglas Kelly	407	49.6	▼10.8
Conservative	Derek Bates	298	36.3	▼3.3
English Democrat	Robin Tilbrook	116	14.1	▲14.1
Majority		109	13.3	▼7.5
Turnout		821	48.8	▲6.8
Liberal Democrats hold		Swing		

=== Passingford ===
Passingford
Party	Candidate	Votes	%	±%
Conservative	Diana Collins	554	82.8	▼5.3
Liberal Democrats	John Clark	115	17.2	▲17.2
Majority		439	65.6	▼10.6
Turnout		669	43.1	▲11.6
Conservative hold		Swing		

=== Theydon Bois ===
Theydon Bois
Party	Candidate	Votes	%	±%
Liberal Democrats	Patricia Rush	798	53.3	▲30.8
Conservative	Matthew Hayday	700	46.7	▲1.7
Majority		98	6.6	▼6.6
Turnout		1,498	48.4	▲7.1
Liberal Democrats gain from Conservative		Swing		

=== Waltham Abbey Honey Lane ===
Waltham Abbey Honey Lane (2)
Party	Candidate	Votes	%	±%
Conservative	Peter McMillan	745	67.7	▼10.2
Conservative	Demitrous Demetriou	703		
Liberal Democrats	Peggy Ayre	355	32.3	▲10.2
Liberal Democrats	Marlis Creevy	324		
Turnout		2,127	26.6	▲8.2
Conservative hold		Swing		
Conservative hold		Swing		

=== Waltham Abbey North East ===
Waltham Abbey North East
Party	Candidate	Votes	%	±%
Conservative	Jeane Lea	617	56.5	▲15.7
Liberal Democrats	Christine Akers	476	43.5	▼15.7
Majority		141	13.0	▼13.8
Turnout		1,093	35.8	▲9.0
Conservative hold		Swing		

=== Waltham Abbey South West ===
Waltham Abbey South West
Party	Candidate	Votes	%	±%
Conservative	Ryan D'Souza	423	54.3	▲1.9
Liberal Democrats	Philip Chadburn	356	45.7	▼1.9
Majority		67	8.6	▲3.8
Turnout		779	28.8	▲6.1
Conservative gain from Liberal Democrats		Swing		
