= Ergun Caner =

Swedish-American academic, author, and minister

Ergun M. Caner
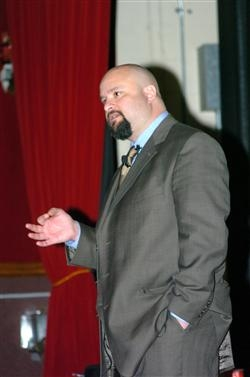
- Born: Ergun Michael Caner; November 3, 1966 (age 60); Stockholm, Sweden
- Occupations: Christian apologist; higher education administrator
- Spouse: Jill Caner (1994-2015; divorce in progress)

Ergun Michael Caner (born November 3, 1966) is a Swedish-American academic, author, and Baptist minister, who became well known for his book, co-authored with his brother, on Islam and his claims that he was a devout Muslim trained as a terrorist. He emigrated to the United States at age four and claimed to have converted to Protestantism in the early 1980s.

Caner is the former President of Brewton-Parker College in Mount Vernon, Georgia. He previously served as the Provost and Vice President of Academic Affairs at Arlington Baptist College and was the former dean of the Liberty Baptist Theological Seminary and Graduate School of Liberty University. He was removed from this position after it became clear to Liberty University faculty and the Liberty University Board that he misrepresented his background.

On January 20, 2015, Brewton-Parker College announced that Dr. Caner was stepping down due to the inability to properly grieve for his deceased son, Braxton, who had committed suicide on July 29, 2014. He has authored and co-authored several books, many of which discuss Islam and Christianity. His book, Unveiling Islam, co-authored with his brother Emir, sold more than 200,000 copies and has been translated into six languages. It also received a 2003 Gold Medallion Book award by the Evangelical Christian Publisher's Association.

== Early life ==
Caner was born in Stockholm, Sweden in 1966 to Acar, a Turkish national, and Monica, a Swede. He was the oldest of three brothers. Caner immigrated to the United States in 1969 with his parents, moving to Ohio. His parents divorced on April 14, 1978, but his father, through court order, initially established that the boys be raised in Islam. Caner's mother Monica successfully fought against the provision in the divorce decree that the children be raised Muslim by making an appeal to the court on February 6, 1979. The court allowed Monica's petition that religious instruction be "according to the desires of each parent" while in their custody. Caner continues to contradict these facts in many of his lecture videos by providing conflicting statements.

Caner was the first of his siblings to profess Christianity, doing so at age 15 after accepting a friend's invitation to a revival meeting at a local Baptist church. Within 18 months, both of Caner's brothers baptised into the church. Caner's father disowned all three sons following their conversions, and he did not see them again until 1999, when a stepsister they had never met called to tell them he was dying with cancer. Caner, then pastoring a church in Denver, Colorado, traveled to his father's home days before he died and introduced him to his wife and son, Braxton.

Caner and his brother Emir became active in Christian ministry. In 1989, Ergun earned a Bachelor of Arts degree in Biblical Studies and Languages at Cumberland College (now the University of the Cumberlands), a Baptist college in Williamsburg, Kentucky. After graduation, he and Emir enrolled at Criswell College in Dallas, Texas, where they first met Criswell president Paige Patterson, who they later described as a surrogate father. Ergun Caner became Patterson's assistant while pursuing a Master of Arts in History. In late 1991, Patterson left Criswell under pressure from the school's board of trustees and became president of Southeastern Baptist Theological Seminary in Wake Forest, North Carolina. Ergun completed his master's degree in 1992, and both Ergun and Emir followed Patterson to Southeastern. There, Caner earned two additional graduate degrees – a Master of Divinity in 1994 and a Master of Theology in 1995. In 2000, he obtained a Doctor of Theology degree at the University of South Africa. After graduation, he returned to Criswell College as a professor of Theology and Church History.

== Public career ==
Patterson urged Caner and his brother to write a book about Islam, citing the need for Christians to understand the Muslim religion in order to convert its followers to Christianity. Caner said the importance of writing the book was impressed upon him following the terrorist attacks on the World Trade Center on September 11, 2001. The book, Unveiling Islam: An Insider's Look at Muslim Life and Beliefs, was published in March 2002. Paperback editions of the book included a foreword by Richard Land, president of the Southern Baptist Convention's Ethics and Religious Liberty Commission. The book was a commercial success, selling 100,000 copies in its first year of publication. The Evangelical Christian Publishers Association awarded it the Gold Medallion for a missions/evangelism book in 2003.

A review in the Fort Worth Star-Telegram described Unveiling Islam as "a sketch of religious history, theology and life" and "a handy, brief guide to what is often an unknown world". The reviewer further noted that the book was "strongly evangelistic" and "emphasizes the faith's militant aspect". IslamOnline's Ali Asadullah called Unveiling Islam "a diatribe against Muslims and their faith."

In June 2002, the Caners received national attention for Unveiling Islam after Jerry Vines referred to the Islamic prophet Muhammad as a "demon-possessed pedophile", citing the book as evidence, in a sermon at the annual meeting of the Southern Baptist Convention in St. Louis, Missouri. In the aftermath of these remarks, Muslim leaders labeled Caner and his brother as kafirs or "infidels".

In the years following the publication of Unveiling Islam, Caner became a well-known and popular speaker at evangelical schools and churches. In September 2002, The Dallas Morning News reported that both Caner brothers were "booked [as speakers] nearly every weekend all over the country for the next few years". In 2003, Caner accepted an invitation from Jerry Falwell, founding president of Liberty University in Lynchburg, Virginia, to join the university's faculty. Later that year, Ergun and Emir published The Sacred Trust: Sketches of the Southern Baptist Convention Presidents. A review in Baptist History and Heritage magazine said the book "does achieve its goal in giving a 'sketch' of each president. Unfortunately, the authors provide no analysis, context, or summary; in short, they offer no theme."

In February 2005, Falwell announced that Caner was to be the first former Muslim to become the President and Dean of an evangelical seminary, making Caner head of Liberty Baptist Theological Seminary. Caner's leadership at Liberty Seminary and with the faculty he built saw the enrollment triple in a relatively short period of time. In conjunction with Child Evangelism Fellowship, Caner led the creation of a Master of Arts degree in Children's Ministry.

Caner was initially listed as signatory to the 2008 Evangelical Manifesto prepared by a group of religious leaders in an attempt to define evangelical beliefs and de-politicize the evangelical movement. Caner said he was asked to read the document but never consented to endorse it. He said he agreed with much of the document but characterized the language regarding political activism as "spineless" and a "group hug approach to Christianity". David Neff, a member of the committee that drafted the manifesto, said the inclusion of Caner's name was an oversight and was corrected when he objected.

On December 4, 2013 it was announced that Caner had been elected 16th president of Brewton-Parker College, an independent, four-year coeducational college located in Mount Vernon, Ga. with strong ties to the Georgia Baptist Convention. On January 22, 2015 it was reported Caner would soon resign his presidency of Brewton-Parker. Caner explained the July, 2014 suicide of his 15 year-old son Braxton was responsible for his decision: "Brewton-Parker College cannot become a healthy, growing and stable college under the leadership of a man who is broken, ... and I am admitting to you that I am broken. I can’t get over his death, and I am not sure I want to. I do know that I cannot muster the fight needed to be the leader of our college. My family and my heart need healing, and you deserve better." Other observers have claimed that Caner's sudden resignation from Brewton-Parker preceded his certain termination for having made several racially disparaging remarks, comments that many of the students and faculty at Brewton-Parker had recently become aware of, and many had been publicly protesting.

== Controversy ==
In a 2009 San Francisco Examiner article, Davi Barker highlighted errors Caner had made in public statements about Islam, including mispronouncing the word muadhin, misquoting the Shahada, and incorrectly stating that the Muslim holy month of Ramadan lasted 40 days when it only lasts either 29 or 30 days.

In 2010, Christian and Muslim bloggers accused Caner of making up and lying about his life story by citing details that were incongruent with his regularly stated, printed, and often repeated story. The critics particularly challenged Caner's claims to have grown up in Turkey, when he actually grew up in Ohio; being raised in a devout Muslim home, rather than a nominal one; having been trained as an Islamic jihadist; having debated dozens of Muslims, although they say there is no evidence of such. Mohammad Khan, a Muslim from London, England, was the first to show that Caner's recitation of what he claimed was the Shahada, the Islamic creed, is actually the first two verses of the Qur'an, wrongly recited.

On May 10, 2010, Liberty University announced that it would launch a formal inquiry into allegations of discrepancies in the claimed background of Caner, the Dean and President of the Liberty Baptist Theological Seminary and Graduate School. Caner said, "I am thrilled that Liberty University is forming this committee, and I look forward to this entire process coming to a close." The committee reported "discrepancies related to the matters such as dates, names and places of residence" in Caner's public statements, although they found no evidence to contradict the idea that he was a Muslim who converted to Christianity as a teenager. The committee also reported that Caner had cooperated with its investigation and apologized for the identified discrepancies. As a result of the investigation, on June 25, 2010, Liberty University removed Caner from his position as Dean of the seminary, but decided to retain him as a full-time faculty member of the seminary for the 2010–2011 school year.

On September 24, 2010, Caner was the keynote speaker for the Twin City's 12th Annual Community Prayer Breakfast in Bristol, Virginia. When interviewed about the controversy, the chairman of the local prayer breakfast committee said that members were aware of the controversy, but the invitation had been issued before the controversy became apparent. He also noted that the Community Prayer Breakfast does not delve into the backgrounds of their motivational/inspirational speakers. At the meeting, Caner claimed that he and his brother had seen the controversy coming for years. The bloggers were simply "frustrated people in their basements", he said, adding that it would take more than edited videos to take him down.

Caner left LU in June 2011 to become Provost and Vice President of Academic Affairs for the Arlington Baptist College. The President of Arlington Baptist College, Dr. Dan Moody, stated that Caner's controversy was in the past and the new Vice President had his full confidence. Caner filed a lawsuit on June 18, 2013, in the U.S. district court in North Texas claiming copyright infringement for reproducing, uploading and maintaining his videos without permission. The lawsuit was dismissed with prejudice on April 17, 2014. The judge ruled the videos had been posted in their entirety and were not edited as Caner had earlier claimed. Two courts ruled the lawsuits were frivolous and ordered Caner to pay a combined total of $59,183.39 in legal fees. Following the court order, YouTube made the videos available again.

== Books ==
- Caner, Ergun, and Emir Fethi Caner. Unveiling Islam: An Insider's Look at Muslim Life and Beliefs. Updated and Expanded ed. Grand Rapids: Kregel Publications, 2009. ISBN 0-8254-2428-3
- Caner, Emir Fethi, and Ergun Mehmet Caner. More Than a Prophet: an Insider's Response to Muslim Beliefs About Jesus and Christianity. Grand Rapids: Kregel Publications, 2003. ISBN 0-8254-2401-1
- Caner Emir, and Ergun Caner. The Sacred Trust: Sketches of the Southern Baptist Convention Presidents. Nashville, Tenn.: B&H Academic, 2003. ISBN 0-8054-2668-X
- Caner, Ergun Mehmet, and Emir Fethi Caner, eds. The Sacred Desk: Sermons of the Southern Baptist Convention Presidents. Nashville, Tenn.: B&H Publishing Group, 2004. ISBN 0-8054-3059-8
- Caner, Ergun Mehmet, ed. Voices Behind the Veil: the World of Islam through the Eyes of Women. Grand Rapids, Michigan: Kregel Publications, 2004. ISBN 0-8254-2402-X
- Caner, Ergun Mehmet, and Emir Fethi Caner. Christian Jihad: Two Former Muslims Look at the Crusades and Killing in the Name of Christ. Grand Rapids, Michigan: Kregel Publications, 2004. ISBN 0-8254-2403-8
- Brunson, Mac & Caner, Ergun. Why Churches Die: Diagnosing Lethal Poisons in the Body of Christ. Nashville: B&H Books, 2005. ISBN 0-8054-3181-0
- Hoffman, Paul K., and Norman L. Geisler, eds. Why I Am a Christian: Leading Thinkers Explain Why They Believe. Rev. and expanded ed. Grand Rapids, Mich.: Baker Books, 2006. ISBN 0-8010-6712-X
- Cabal, Ted, ed. The Apologetics Study Bible: Understand Why You Believe. Nashville, Tennessee: Holman Bible Publishers, 2007. ISBN 1-58640-024-X
- Pollock, Forrest. The Last Sermon I Would Preach If Jesus Were Coming Tomorrow. Encouraging Word, 2007. ISBN 0-615-15940-0
- Hindson, Ed, and Caner, Ergun, general editors. The Popular Encyclopedia of Apologetics. Eugene, Or.: Harvest House Publishers, 2008. ISBN 0-7369-2084-6
- Falwell, Jonathan, general editor. InnovateChurch. Nashville, Tenn.: B&H Books, 2008. ISBN 0-8054-4826-8
- Caner, Ergun Mehmet. Holier Than Thou: When Faith Becomes Toxic. Nashville: Abingdon Press, 2009. ISBN 0-687-65840-3
- Allen, David L., and Steve W Lemke, eds. The Return of Christ: A Premillennial Perspective. Nashville: B&H Academic, 2011. ISBN 1-4336-6972-2

== See also ==
- Southern Baptist Convention
- List of Southern Baptist Convention affiliated people
- Walid Shoebat
- Mike Warnke
- World Baptist Fellowship
