= Walid Shoebat =

Palestinian American author

- Born: West Bank
- Occupations: Speaker, author
- Notable work: Why I Left Jihad: The Root of Terrorism and the Return of Radical Islam (2005); Why We Want to Kill You: The Jihadist Mindset and How to Defeat it (2007); God's War on Terror: Islam, Prophecy and the Bible (2008, with Joel Richardson)
- Children: Theodore Shoebat

Walid Shoebat (Arabic: وليد شعيبات, born 1960) is a Palestinian American speaker, author and a critic of Islam. He was born in the West Bank to an American mother, and converted to Christianity from Islam. Shoebat has claimed to be an ex-PLO terrorist in a CNN television interview. He is a self-proclaimed expert on the dangers of Islam and is also a strong supporter of the State of Israel. Shoebat has also claimed that he firebombed the Israeli bank Bank Leumi; however, after thoroughly investigating this claim, reporters and officials have found no evidence of any attack on the bank in 1979.

== Early life ==
According to the biography on his official website, Shoebat was born in Bethlehem, the grandson of the Mukhtar of Beit Sahour, whom Shoebat describes as an associate of Grand Mufti of Jerusalem Mohammad Amin al-Husayni. Shoebat said that he joined the Palestine Liberation Organization in his youth, and also says he was involved in an attack against an Israeli bank. There was no evidence for Shoebat's claims when investigated by journalists.

According to Shoebat, upon his release, he continued his anti-Israeli activism until going to the United States, where he became involved with the Arab Student Organization at Loop College in Chicago. Shortly afterwards Shoebat worked as a software engineer and became a US citizen. Shoebat says he converted to Christianity in 1993.

== Career as activist, author and speaker ==
In 2004 and again in 2006, Shoebat was denied entrance to Canada on security grounds due to his self-described affiliation with the Palestine Liberation Organization. He had been scheduled to speak in Ottawa at an event organized by the Simon Wiesenthal Center; Zachariah Anani spoke in Shoebat's place.

Showbat was a frequent, if controversial, public speaker on terrorism and Islam in the 2000s.

Shoebat has been introduced as a terrorism expert on several television programs, including appearances on CNN and its sister network HLN in 2006 and 2007. However, CNN points out that Shoebat makes errors in his presentation, including his assertion that the Transportation Security Administration could have prevented the September 11 attacks, even though the TSA was not created until after the attacks.

He is the author of three self-published books.

=== Books ===
- Why I Left Jihad: The Root of Terrorism and the Return of Radical Islam, 2005
- Why We Want to Kill You: The Jihadist Mindset and How to Defeat it, 2007
- God's War on Terror: Islam, Prophecy and the Bible, with Joel Richardson, 2008

== Personal views ==
After the September 11 attacks in 2001, Shoebat claims that he became an active advocate against Islamism and a strong supporter of the State of Israel. Shoebat is the founder of the Walid Shoebat Foundation, an organization that claims to "fight for the Jewish people". He is sometimes paid for his appearances and solicits donations for the foundation. He says he formed the foundation to educate Americans as to why the US should support Israel. Shoebat has said that he believes "in a Greater Israel that includes Judea and Samaria, and by this I mean a Jewish state". He regards the Gaza Strip as Jewish by right and believes Israel should retake the territory saying, "If a Jew has no right to Gaza, then he has no right to Jaffa or Haifa either." He advocates that Israel deport anyone who denies its right to exist, "even if they were born there".

Shoebat gives lectures to local police departments regarding his belief that "most Muslims seek to impose Sharia in the United States. To prevent this, he said in an interview, he warns officers that 'you need to look at the entire pool of Muslims in a community.'" According to The Washington Post, "When Shoebat spoke to the first annual South Dakota Fusion Center Conference in Sioux Falls ... he told them to monitor Muslim student groups and local mosques and, if possible, tap their phones. 'You can find out a lot of information that way,' he said."

Shoebat argues that parallels exist between radical Islam and Nazism. He says, "Secular dogma like Nazism is less dangerous than Islamofascism that we see today ... because Islamofascism has a religious twist to it; it says 'God the Almighty ordered you to do this' ... It is trying to grow itself in fifty-five Muslim states. So potentially, you could have a success rate of several Nazi Germanys, if these people get their way."

== Criticism ==
On April 9, 2008, Shoebat responded to the earlier Jerusalem Post's report on that paper's op-ed page. He wrote that the Jerusalem Post had been duped. According to him, the sources who disputed his own account of his upbringing (including his relatives) were themselves involved in terrorism. He said they want to see him discredited, probably because of his conversion to Christianity. He also states that reputable witnesses who could confirm the bombing operation of Bank Leumi were not interviewed.

On July 13, 2011, CNN's Anderson Cooper 360° reported an investigative piece into Walid Shoebat's claim to authority based on being a former terrorist. The report found that according to Israeli government officials, the bank that Walid Shoebat claimed to have attacked, and his own relatives, no record of his supposed terrorist history existed. Another of Shoebat's claims, that of a two-week term in an Israeli jail, was also unsubstantiated, with Israel having no record he was ever jailed. His cousin, interviewed in the report, stated that he had never known Shoebat to have ties to any movement, and that his claims of being a former terrorist were "for his own personal reasons". According to CNN, their reporters in the United States, Israel and the Palestinian territories found no evidence to support Shoebat's claims and "neither Shoebat nor his business partner provided any proof of Shoebat's involvement in terrorism".

Omar Sacirbey's 2010 Washington Post article reports that Ibrahim Hooper, spokesman for the Council on American–Islamic Relations, has questioned Shoebat's motives, saying that "Ergun Caner, Shoebat, and Kamal Saleem—along with others like them—belong to an 'industry' that is often perpetuated by fundamentalist Christians" and that people are doing this "to make money or get converts or to get some personal benefit". The article also reports that skeptics have questioned how Shoebat and others have been able to retain US citizenship if their stories of terrorist activities are true.

=== Charitable organization status ===
When the Post asked Shoebat whether the Walid Shoebat Foundation is a registered charity, he said that it was registered in Pennsylvania. The Pennsylvania Attorney General's Charitable Trusts and Organizations Section said it had no record of such a charity. When asked again, Shoebat said it was registered under a different name, but that he was not aware of the Foundation's registered name, nor any other details, which were known only to his manager. Dr. Joel Fishman of the Allegheny County Law Library in Pennsylvania expressed doubts about Walid Shoebat Foundation's donation process. He noted that if the money was being given to a registered charity, the charity would have to make annual reports to the state and federal government.

== Family ==
He is the father of author Theodore Shoebat, known for his extreme anti-LGBT views.

== See also ==
- Criticism of Islam
- List of former Muslims
