= An Evangelical Manifesto =

Evangelical document

See Washington Declaration for other documents of this name.

An Evangelical Manifesto, subtitled The Washington Declaration of Evangelical Identity and Public Commitment or simply A Declaration of Evangelical Identity and Public Commitment, is a document issued in Washington DC on May 7, 2008, by 80 evangelical leaders.

== See also ==
- Chicago Statement on Biblical Inerrancy
- The Cambridge Declaration
