= Patricia Richardson (politician) =

British politician

Epping Forest District Councillor for Loughton Broadway
- In office 1 May 2008 – 3 May 2012
- Preceded by: Thomas Richardson
- Succeeded by: Leon Girling

Epping Forest District Councillor for Loughton Fairmead
- In office 10 June 2004 – 1 May 2008
- Preceded by: Albert Farren
- Succeeded by: David Wixley

Personal details
- Born: Patricia Feldman; 1944 or 1945 Stoke Newington, Greater London, England
- Died: 2022 or 2023 (aged 77–79)
- Party: For Britain Movement
- Other political affiliations: British National Party
- Spouse: Thomas Richardson
- Parents: Abraham Feldman (father); Fay Groner (mother)

Patricia Richardson (née Feldman, 1944 or 1945 – 2022 or 2023) was a British politician, most notable as the British National Party's first Jewish candidate, though she did not practise Judaism.

== Early life ==
She grew up in Stoke Newington, close to the ultra-Orthodox Jewish community in Stamford Hill, as the youngest of three sisters. Her father, Abraham Feldman, came from Romania, while her mother, Fay Groner, was born in the East End of London, and was of Lithuanian descent. Her father died of a burst ulcer when she was 16, leaving her religiously Jewish mother to raise her and her siblings in Chingford.

== Political career ==
=== BNP ===
In the 2004 local elections, she won a seat on Epping Forest District Council, representing the Loughton Fairmead ward with a narrow majority of 13. Her husband, Thomas Richardson, also a BNP candidate, won the nearby ward of Loughton Broadway.

In the 2008 local elections, she was elected in the Loughton Broadway ward, covering part of the Debden council estate, with a majority of 123 over Labour. Her old Fairmead seat was lost heavily to the Loughton Residents Association.

From 2009, she was the leader of the BNP group on the local council, but in the 2012 local elections lost her seats in both the district and town councils. She also served on Loughton Town Council 2008-12.

Under her leadership, the BNP campaigned against Muslim prayer meetings in Loughton, claiming in a leaflet approved by her (the Epping Forest Patriot) that the community hall used would be turned into a mosque. Following allegations of abduction and a firebomb attack on his home, the prayer meeting's organiser accused the BNP. He was subsequently questioned by police on suspicion of perverting the course of justice. Richardson said the BNP was not behind the alleged attacks and told The Guardian, "Firebombing is not a British method. A brick through the window is a British method."

She was the BNP candidate for Epping Forest in the 2010 general election.

=== For Britain ===
In the 2019 local elections, Richardson stood in Waltham Abbey Honey Lane ward for the For Britain Movement, coming second to the Conservative Sam Kane. She contested the same ward in 2021, finishing third.

== Elections contested ==
UK Parliament elections

Date of election	Constituency	Party	Votes	%	Result
2010	Epping Forest	BNP	1,982	4.3	Not elected (4th)

Essex County Council elections

Date of election	Constituency	Party	Votes	%	Result
2005	Loughton Central	BNP	768	9.9	Not elected (4th)
2009	Waltham Abbey	BNP	1,072	21.0	Not elected (2nd)
2013	Waltham Abbey	BNP	87	2.6	Not elected (6th)

Epping Forest District Council elections

Date of election	Constituency	Party	Votes	%	Result
2004	Loughton Fairmead	BNP	258	26.6	Elected
2008	Loughton Broadway	BNP	469	39.7	Elected
2012	Loughton Broadway	BNP	94	11.3	Not elected (4th)
2019	Waltham Abbey Honey Lane	For Britain	250	23.0	Not elected (2nd)
2021	Waltham Abbey Honey Lane	For Britain	242	18.1	Not elected (3rd)
2022	Loughton Broadway	For Britain	16	2.0	Not elected (4th)
