= Emir Caner =

President of Truett McConnell University

Emir Caner (born August 25, 1970) was the eighth president of Truett McConnell University, a private Baptist university in Cleveland, Georgia. On June 6, 2025 the Board of Trustees of Truett McConnell University placed Caner on administrative leave while allegations of mishandling sexual abuse complaints at the school were investigated; he was fired in September 2025. Since 9/11, he and his brother Ergun Caner have been credited with playing a significant role in cultivating Islamophobia and Christian nationalism in the evangelical Christian community.

== Early life ==
Caner was born to a Turkish father named Acar and a Swedish mother named Monica. He grew up in Gahanna, Ohio.

== Education ==
Caner earned a B.A. in Biblical Studies from Criswell College (1993), an M.Div. from Southeastern Baptist Theological Seminary (1995), and a Ph.D. in history from the University of Texas at Arlington (1999). Caner's dissertation was entitled “Truth Is Unkillable: The Life and Writings of Balthasar Hubmaier, Theologian to the Anabaptists.”

== Academic career ==
Prior to arriving at Truett McConnell, Caner held the following academic positions: Assistant Professor of Church History and Anabaptist Studies at Southeastern Baptist Theological Seminary in Wake Forest, North Carolina (1999–2004); Associate Dean of The College at Southeastern in Wake Forest, North Carolina (2004–05); and Dean of The College at Southwestern, Director of the Center for Free Church Studies and Professor of History at Southwestern Baptist Theological Seminary in Fort Worth, Texas (2005–08).

== Politics ==
Caner has been a member of the Council for National Policy, a conservative political advocacy group.

In 2018, Caner announced that Truett McConnell would no longer sell Nike apparel in its campus bookstore because of the athletic company's hiring of Colin Kaepernick.

Caner is a member of the steering council for the Conservative Baptist Network, a group of southern Baptists that opposes critical race theory and aligns itself with the political positions of Donald Trump and the Republican Party.

Under Caner's leadership, Truett McConnell regularly hosts events focused on political conservatism, such as the Todd Starnes Faith and Freedom Celebration, which has featured former National Security Council member Oliver North (2018), former Arkansas governor Mike Huckabee (2019), and former Trump administration press secretary Sarah Huckabee Sanders (2021). Another similar event held at Truett McConnell was the 2020 Conservative Baptist Network's Pastor Prophet Patriot event that featured Family Research Council president Tony Perkins, Pastor Brad Jurkovich of First Bossier in Bossier City, Louisiana, and evangelist Tim Lee.

== Controversy ==
Caner and his brother Ergun became the focus of controversy after the publication of their 2002 book Unveiling Islam: An Insider's Look at Muslim Life and Beliefs. In it, the Caner brothers stated, among other things, that they were raised in “radical Islam” in Turkey, which was verifiably not true. Ergun drew much of the criticism for the factual errors and other discrepancies in the book that called into question the brothers’ exposure to, and practice of, the Muslim faith. The controversy eventually cost him his position as dean of the Liberty University Baptist Theological Seminary and Graduate School in 2010. Despite some critics pointing to Emir's complicity in the spread of this embellished upbringing, he avoided the same type of consequence.

In addition to the above controversy, former Southern Baptist Convention president Jerry Vines cited Emir and Ergun Caner's book for the source of his claim at a 2002 pastors' conference that the Islamic prophet Muhammad was "a demon-possessed pedophile." Vines' statement elicited outrage and claims of Islamophobia from Muslims and non-Muslims alike. Emir Caner defended the book, saying, "We have attempted to give an honest and compassionate portrayal of the tenets of Islam without any compromise or equivocation." Caner also stated that Muhammad was a "warmonger" and Islam was "at its core, a violent faith." Such statements have led scholars to identify Emir and his brother Ergun as leaders in pushing evangelical Christians to embrace Islamophobia and militant nationalism in the post-9/11 era.

== Personal life ==
Caner met Hana Titerova (born 1975) in Mikulov, Czech Republic; they married in 2000. They have three children: John Mark, Daniela, and Anna.

== Books ==
- Caner, Ergun, and Emir Fethi Caner. Unveiling Islam: An Insider's Look at Muslim Life and Beliefs. Grand Rapids: Kregel Publications, 2002. ISBN 978-0825424281 (Winner, Evangelical Christian Publishers Association's Gold Medallion Book Award in the Missions/Evangelism category)
- Caner, Emir Fethi, and Ergun Mehmet Caner. More Than a Prophet: An Insider's Response to Muslim Beliefs About Jesus and Christianity. Grand Rapids: Kregel Publications, 2003. ISBN 0-8254-2401-1
- Caner, Emir Fethi, and Ergun Mehmet Caner. Out of the Crescent Shadows: Leading Muslim Women into the Light of Christ. Birmingham, Alabama: New Hope Publishers, 2003. ISBN 1-5630-9761-3
- Caner, Emir Fethi, and Ergun Mehmet Caner. The Sacred Trust: Sketches of the Southern Baptist Convention Presidents. Nashville, Tenn.: B&H Academic, 2003. ISBN 0-8054-2668-X
- Caner, Ergun Mehmet, and Emir Fethi Caner. Christian Jihad: Two Former Muslims Look at the Crusades and Killing in the Name of Christ. Grand Rapids, Michigan: Kregel Publications, 2004. ISBN 0-8254-2403-8
- Caner, Ergun Mehmet, and Emir Fethi Caner, eds. The Sacred Desk: Sermons of the Southern Baptist Convention Presidents. Nashville, Tenn.: B&H Publishing Group, 2004. ISBN 0-8054-3059-8
- Caner, Emir Fethi, and H. Edward Pruitt. The Costly Call: Modern-Day Stories of Muslims Who Found Jesus. Grand Rapids, Michigan: Kregel Publications, 2005. ISBN 0-8254-3555-2
- Caner, Emir Fethi, and H. Edward Pruitt. The Costly Call: Book 2. Grand Rapids, Michigan: Kregel Publications, 2006. ISBN 0-8254-3564-1
- Ankerberg, John, and Emir Fethi Caner. The Truth About Islam and Jesus. Eugene, Oregon: Harvest House Publishers, 2009. ISBN 0-7369-2502-3
- Ankerberg, John, and Emir Fethi Caner. The Truth About Islam and Jihad. Eugene, Oregon: Harvest House Publishers, 2009. ISBN 0-7369-2501-5
- Ankerberg, John, and Emir Fethi Caner. The Truth About Islam and Women. Eugene, Oregon: Harvest House Publishers, 2009. ISBN 0-7369-2503-1
