= Prescribed senior official =

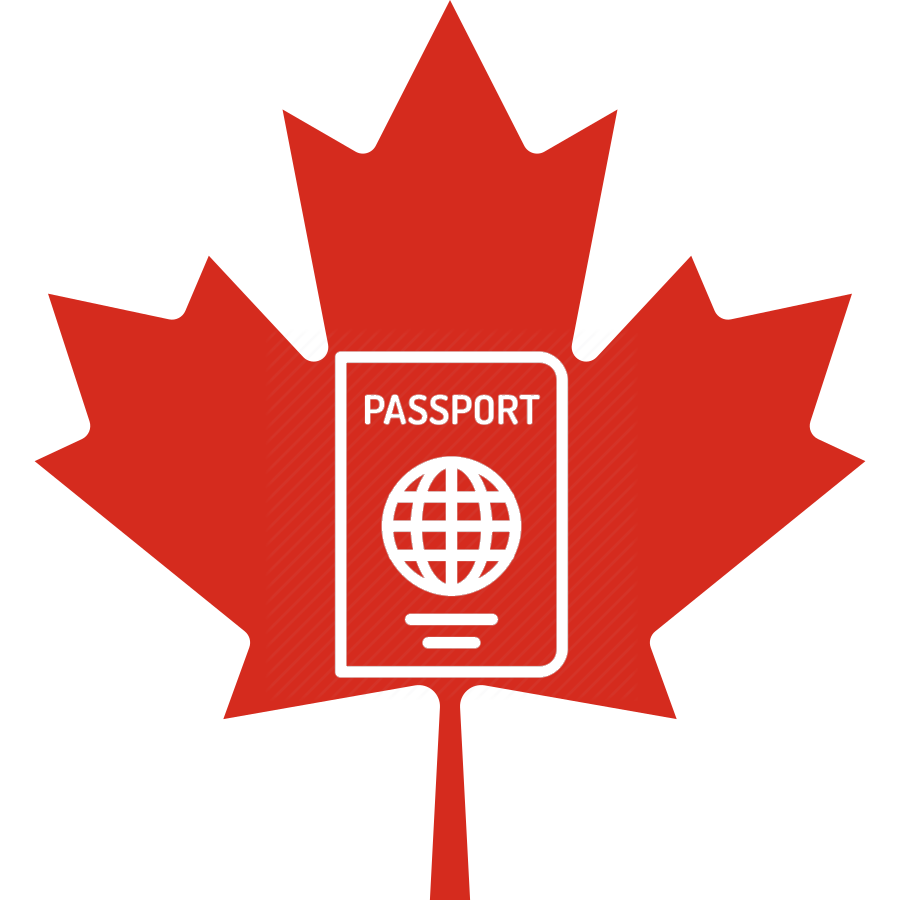

Prescribed senior official is the term used by the Canada Border Services Agency to refer to an individual who will be refused admission into Canada by virtue of their past or current service in or for a government responsible for war crimes or crimes against humanity

== Inadmissibility ==
Section 35(1)(b) of the Canadian Crimes Against Humanity and War Crimes Act provides that a permanent resident or a foreign national is inadmissible on grounds of violating human or international rights for

"... being a prescribed senior official in the service of a government that, in the opinion of the Minister, engages or has engaged in terrorism, systematic or gross human rights violations, or genocide, a war crime or a crime against humanity within the meaning of subsections 6(3) to (5) of the Act".

For the purposes of the Act, Section 16 of the Immigration and Refugee Protection Regulations defines a prescribed senior official in the service of a government as a person who

"by virtue of the position they hold or held, is or was able to exert significant influence on the exercise of government power or is or was able to benefit from their position, and includes

(a) heads of state or government; (b) members of the cabinet or governing council; (c) senior advisors to persons described in paragraph (a) or (b); (d) senior members of the public service; (e) senior members of the military and of the intelligence and internal security services; (f) ambassadors and senior diplomatic officials; and

(g) members of the judiciary".

== Implementation ==
According to the immigration service enforcement manual, ENF 18: War Crimes and Crimes against Humanity,

"If it can be demonstrated that the position is in the top half of the organization, the position can be considered senior"

The manual was quoted in the case of Younis v. Canada (Citizenship and Immigration), 2010 FC 1157. The "top half indicator" has been cited in a number of cases, including:

- Hamidi v. Canada (Minister of Citizenship and Immigration), 2006, FC 333
- Nezam v. Canada (Minister of Citizenship and Immigration), 2005 FC 446
- Holway v. Canada (Minister of Citizenship and Immigration), 2006 FC 309

Personal lack of culpability was determined as not relevant to the matter of inadmissibility under paragraph 19(1)(l) of the former Canadian Immigration Act (R.S.C. 1985, c. I-2), which is now paragraph 35(1)(b) of the Act. Paragraph 35(1)(b) is not concerned with complicity in prohibited acts but with whether a position held is senior.

== Breach of command/superior responsibility ==
The Crimes against Humanity and War Crimes Act incorporates Canada's obligations as a signatory of the Rome Statute of the International Criminal Court into Canadian law (Canada was the first signatory to ratify it). The failure of a military commander or superior to fulfil their responsibility to take measures to prevent or repress genocide, crimes against humanity and war crimes by not submitting the commission of such a crime by a subordinate to the competent authorities for investigation is deemed breach of command/superior responsibility and made a criminal offence under the Act.
