= Buckhurst Hill East (ward) =

Coordinates: 51.624°N 0.048°E

- Former electoral ward for the Epping Forest District Council
- Buckhurst Hill East ward boundaries from 2002 to 2024
- District: Epping Forest
- County: Essex
- Population: 4,729 (2021)
- Electorate: 3,481 (2022)
- Major settlements: Buckhurst Hill
- Area: 1.195 square kilometres (0.461 sq mi)

Former electoral ward
- Created: 1979
- Abolished: 2024
- Councillors: 1979–2002: 3; 2002–2024: 2
- Replaced by: Buckhurst Hill East and Whitebridge
- GSS code: E05004148

Buckhurst Hill East was an electoral ward in Epping Forest District, United Kingdom, from 1979 to 2024. It was, with Buckhurst Hill West, one of two wards that represented Buckhurst Hill. The ward returned three councillors to the Epping Forest District Council from 1979 to 2002 and two councillors from 2002 to 2024.

== 2002–2024 Epping Forest council elections ==
There was a revision of ward boundaries in Epping Forest in 2002 with all seats up for election that year. The subsequent election cycle for the first Buckhurst Hill East seat was 2004, 2008, 2012, 2016 and 2021. The cycle for the second seat was 2006, 2010, 2014, 2018 and 2022.

=== 2022 election ===
The election took place on 5 May 2022.

2022 Epping Forest District Council election: Buckhurst Hill East
Party	Candidate	Votes	%	±%
Green	Elizabeth Gabbett	677	62.3	+7.9
Conservative	David Saunders	291	26.8	−10.3
Labour	Alain Laviolette	119	10.9	+2.7
Majority		386	35.5	
Turnout		1,095	31.5	
Green hold		Swing	▲9.1	

=== 2021 election ===
The election took place on 6 May 2021.

2021 Epping Forest District Council election: Buckhurst Hill East
Party	Candidate	Votes	%	±%
Green	Simon Heap	753	54.4	▼14.4
Conservative	Smruti Patel	514	37.1	▲9.2
Labour	Alain Laviolette	115	8.2	N/A
Majority		239	17.3	▼3.0
Turnout		1,382	38.9	▼4.1
Green hold		Swing		

=== 2018 election ===
The election took place on 3 May 2018.

2018 Epping Forest District Council election: Buckhurst Hill East
Party	Candidate	Votes	%	±%
Green	Steven Neville	1,084	68.8	▲23.6
Conservative	Neville Wright	440	27.9	▼13.0
Liberal Democrats	Dev Dodeja	50	3.1	N/A
Majority		644	40.9	▲36.6
Turnout		1,574	43%	▲2.0
Green hold		Swing		

=== 2016 election ===
The election took place on 5 May 2016.

2016 Epping Forest District Council election: Buckhurst Hill East
Party	Candidate	Votes	%	±%
Green	Simon Heap	656	45.2	+4.8
Conservative	Neville Wright	593	40.9	+3.5
UKIP	Simon Hearn	201	13.9	N/A
Majority		63	4.3	
Turnout		1,450	41.0	
Green gain from Conservative		Swing		

=== 2014 election ===
The election took place on 22 May 2014.

2014 Epping Forest District Council election: Buckhurst Hill East
Party	Candidate	Votes	%	±%
Green	Steven Neville	635	41.1	+23.3
Conservative	Aniket Patel	574	37.4	–5.2
Liberal Democrats	Chris Greaves	210	13.7	–8.2
Labour	Pamela Griffin	115	7.5	–9.9
Majority		61	4.0	N/A
Turnout		1,534	44.0	
Green gain from Liberal Democrats		Swing		

=== 2012 election ===
The election took place on 3 May 2012.

2012 Epping Forest District Council election: Buckhurst Hill East
Party	Candidate	Votes	%	±%
Conservative	Neville Wright	488	42.6	+0.5
Liberal Democrats	Dev Dodeja	251	21.8	−28.1
Green	Leonard Martin	207	18.0	−10.1
Labour	Andrew Forsey	199	17.3	N/A
Majority		237	20.6	
Turnout		1,145	33.0	−33.0
Conservative gain from Liberal Democrats		Swing		

=== 2010 election ===
The election on 6 May 2010 took place on the same day as the United Kingdom general election.

2010 Epping Forest District Council election: Buckhurst Hill East
Party	Candidate	Votes	%	±%
Liberal Democrats	Peter Spencer	1,136	50.0	▲0.6
Conservative	Marshall Vance	957	42.1	▲1.9
Green	Steven Neville	180	7.9	N/A
Majority		179	7.9	▼1.3
Turnout		2,273	65.8	▲27.2
Liberal Democrats hold		Swing		

=== 2008 election ===
The election took place on 1 May 2008.

2008 Epping Forest District Council election: Buckhurst Hill East
Party	Candidate	Votes	%	±%
Liberal Democrats	Dev Dodeja	648	49.4	▼3.2
Conservative	Marshall Vance	527	40.2	▲6.3
BNP	Graham Cater	137	10.4	▼3.1
Majority		121	9.2	▼9.5
Turnout		1,312	38.6	▼2.7
Liberal Democrats hold		Swing		

=== 2006 election ===
The election took place on 4 May 2006.

2006 Epping Forest District Council election: Buckhurst Hill East
Party	Candidate	Votes	%	±%
Liberal Democrats	Peter Spencer	801	61.3	▲8.7
Conservative	George Denny	506	38.7	▲4.8
Majority		295	22.6	▲3.9
Turnout		1,307	40.4	▼0.9
Liberal Democrats hold		Swing		

=== 2004 election ===
The election took place on 10 June 2004.

2004 Epping Forest District Council election: Buckhurst Hill East
Party	Candidate	Votes	%	±%
Liberal Democrats	Malcolm Woollard	699	52.6	▼1.5
Conservative	Alan Kilbey	450	33.9	▲0.5
BNP	Peter Turpin	179	13.5	N/A
Majority		249	18.7	▼2.0
Turnout		1,328	41.3	▲5.2
Liberal Democrats hold		Swing		

=== 2002 election ===
The election took place on 2 May 2002.

2002 Epping Forest District Council election: Buckhurst Hill East
Party	Candidate	Votes	%	±%
Liberal Democrats	Leonard Martin	661	54.1	
Liberal Democrats	Malcolm Woollard	659		
Conservative	George Denny	408	33.4	
Conservative	Mercedes Window	401		
Labour	Ronald Rodwell	152	12.5	
Majority			20.7	
Turnout		2,281	36.1	
Liberal Democrats win (new boundaries)				
Liberal Democrats win (new boundaries)				

== 1979–2002 Epping Forest council elections ==
There was a revision of ward boundaries in Epping Forest in 1979 with all seats up for election that year. The subsequent election cycle for the first Buckhurst Hill East seat was 1980, 1984, 1988, 1992, 1996 and 2000. The cycle for the second seat was 1982, 1986, 1990, 1994 and 1998. The cycle for the thirst seat was 1983, 1987, 1991, 1995 and 1999.
