= Loughton St John's (ward) =

Electoral ward of Epping Forest, Essex, England

- Electoral ward for the Epping Forest District Council
- Loughton St John's ward boundaries since 2024
- District: Epping Forest
- County: Essex
- Population: 4,492 (2021) (Note: 2021 Census data reported for 2002–2024 ward boundaries)
- Electorate: 5,363 (2024)
- Major settlements: Loughton
- Area: 5.679 square kilometres (2.193 sq mi)

Current electoral ward
- Created: 1979
- Councillors: 1979–2002: 3; 2002–2024: 2; 2024–present: 3
- GSS code: E05004164 (2002–2024); E05015733 (2024–present)

Loughton St John's is an electoral ward in Epping Forest District, United Kingdom, since 1979. The ward returns three councillors to the Epping Forest District Council. (Note: Between 2002 and 2024 the ward returned two councillors.)

== Epping Forest council elections since 2024 ==
There was a revision of ward boundaries in Epping Forest in 2024 with all seats up for election that year.

=== 2024 election ===
The election took place on 2 May 2024.

2024 Epping Forest District Council election: Loughton St John's
Party	Candidate	Votes	%	±%
Loughton Residents	Chris Pond	1,216	75.1	
Loughton Residents	Howard Kauffman	1,106	68.3	
Loughton Residents	Graham Wiskin	1,012	62.5	
Conservative	Valerie Metcalfe	366	22.6	
Labour	Emma Roberts	274	16.9	
Turnout		1,625	30	
Registered electors		5,363		
Loughton Residents win (new boundaries)				
Loughton Residents win (new boundaries)				
Loughton Residents win (new boundaries)				

== 2002–2024 Epping Forest council elections ==
Loughton St John's ward boundaries between 2002 and 2024

There was a revision of ward boundaries in Epping Forest in 2002 with all seats up for election that year. The subsequent election cycle for the first Loughton St John's seat was 2004, 2008, 2012, 2016 and 2021. The cycle for the second seat was 2006, 2010, 2014, 2018 and 2022.

=== 2022 election ===
The election took place on 5 May 2022.

2022 Epping Forest District Council election: Loughton St John's
Party	Candidate	Votes	%	±%
Loughton Residents	Bob Jennings	785	67.2	−0.6
Conservative	Bob Church	223	19.1	−3.1
Labour	Jill Bostock	160	13.7	+3.9
Majority		562	48.1	
Turnout		1,171	34.3	
Loughton Residents hold		Swing	▲1.3	

=== 2021 election ===
The election took place on 6 May 2021.

2021 Epping Forest District Council election: Loughton St John's
Party	Candidate	Votes	%	±%
Loughton Residents	Caroline Pond	901	67.8	▼3.8
Conservative	Bob Church	296	22.2	▲2.2
Labour	Jill Bostock	131	9.8	▲1.5
Majority		605	45.6	▼6.0
Turnout		1,328	38.3	▲3.3
Loughton Residents hold		Swing		

=== 2018 election ===
The election took place on 3 May 2018.

2018 Epping Forest District Council election: Loughton St John's
Party	Candidate	Votes	%	±%
Loughton Residents	Bob Jennings	884	71.6	▼10.2
Conservative	Neal Bagshaw	247	20.0	▲1.8
Labour	Jill Bostock	103	8.3	N/A
Majority		637	51.6	▼11.4
Turnout		1,234	35%	Steady
Loughton Residents hold		Swing		

=== 2016 election ===
The election took place on 5 May 2016.

2016 Epping Forest District Council election: Loughton St Johns
Party	Candidate	Votes	%	±%
Loughton Residents	Caroline Pond	982	81.8	+12.0
Conservative	Bob Church	218	18.2	−3.0
Majority		764	63.6	
Turnout		1,200	35.0	
Loughton Residents hold		Swing		

== 1979–2002 Epping Forest council elections ==
There was a revision of ward boundaries in Epping Forest in 1979 with all seats up for election that year. The subsequent election cycle for the first Loughton St John's seat was 1980, 1984, 1988, 1992, 1996 and 2000. The cycle for the second seat was 1982, 1986, 1990, 1994 and 1998. The cycle for the thirst seat was 1983, 1987, 1991, 1995 and 1999.
