= 2027 Epping Forest District Council election =

2027 English local government election

- 6 May 2027

18 out of 54 seats to Epping Forest District Council 28 seats needed for a majority
| Leader | Chris Whitbread | Jaymey McIvor | Chris Pond |
| Party | Conservative | Reform | Loughton Residents |
| Leader's seat | Roydon & Lower Nazeing | Ongar | Loughton St John's |
| Last election | 19 seats, 26.1% | 12 seats, 40.5% | 12 seats, 8.0% |
| Current seats | 19 | 12 | 12 |
| Leader | Jon Whitehouse | | Martin Morris |
| Party | Liberal Democrats | Independent | Labour |
| Leader's seat | Epping East | | Waltham Abbey North |
| Last election | 6 seats, 8.5% | 4 seats, 4.5% | 1 seat, 7.1% |
| Current seats | 6 | 4 | 1 |
Incumbent Leader
Chris Whitbread
Conservative
No overall control (Note: Conservative minority.)

The 2027 Epping Forest District Council election will be held on 6 May 2027 to elect members of Epping Forest District Council in Essex, England. This will be on the same day as other local elections held across the United Kingdom.

== Background ==
=== Local government reorganisation ===
Due to proposed structural changes to local government in England, the 2026 election was intended to be the final election to the council before it was abolished and replaced by West Essex Council, a unitary authority. However, on 7 September 2026, the government announced it was withdrawing plans for the planned restructuring pending review. Following this announcement, local elections due to be held in 2027 under the existing local electoral calendar would proceed.

== Summary ==
=== Election result ===
2027 Epping Forest District Council election
| Party | This election | | | | Full council | | | This election | | |
| Party | Candidates | Seats | Net | Seats % | Other | Total | Total % | Votes | Votes % | +/− |
|---|---|---|---|---|---|---|---|---|---|---|
| Conservative | | | | | 12 | | | | | |
| Reform | | | | | 11 | | | | | |
| Loughton Residents | | | | | 7 | | | | | |
| Liberal Democrats | | | | | 3 | | | | | |
| Independent | | | | | 2 | | | | | |
| Labour | | | | | 1 | | | | | |

=== Incumbents ===
| Ward | Incumbent councillor | Affiliation | Re-standing |
|---|---|---|---|
| Buckhurst Hill East & Whitebridge | Barbara Cohen | Loughton Residents | |
| Buckhurst Hill West | Ken Williamson | Conservative | |
| Chigwell with Lambourne | Kaz Rizvi | Conservative | |
| Epping East | Jon Whitehouse | Liberal Democrats | |
| Epping West & Rural | Razia Sharif | Liberal Democrats | |
| Grange Hill | Lisa Morgan (Note: Sits in the Epping Forest Independent Group (EFIG).) | Independent | |
| Loughton Fairmead | Will Kauffman | Loughton Residents | |
| Loughton Forest | Michael Owen | Loughton Residents | |
| Loughton Roding | Sheree Rackham | Loughton Residents | |
| Loughton St John's | Howard Kauffman | Loughton Residents | |
| North Weald Bassett | Nigel Bedford | Conservative | |
| Ongar | Jaymey McIvor (Note: Originally elected as a Conservative, but later defected to Reform.) | Reform | |
| Roydon & Lower Nazeing | Chris Whitbread | Conservative | |
| Rural East | Richard Morgan | Conservative | |
| Theybois Bois with Passingford | Tippy Cornish | Liberal Democrats | |
| Waltham Abbey North | Jeane Lea | Conservative | |
| Waltham Abbey South & Rural | Maria Markham (Note: Originally elected as a Conservative, but later left the party to sit as an independent.) | Independent | |
| Waltham Abbey West | Jodie Lucas | Conservative | |
