= Politics of Loughton =

Loughton in Essex, England, was an urban district from 1900 to 1933, when it became part of Chigwell Urban District until 1974, when Epping Forest District Council was created. Loughton Town Council was established in 1996. The Town Council consists of 22 councillors representing seven wards, elected for a four-year term. The council adopted the designation Town Council just after its re-creation as a parish in 1996, and changed the title of its chairman to Town Mayor in 2004.

== Overview ==
Loughton is politically diverse and somewhat heterodox. The Urban District Council was not elected under party affiliations, but was largely shared by those of Conservative and Liberal backgrounds; conservatives generally after 1933. In 1981, the Loughton Residents' Association (LRA, and originally the Central Loughton Residents' Association) was formed to protest against what was said to be a planning decision in the town centre taken improperly behind closed doors. During the 1980s, the LRA ousted the previous conservative-held seats in Loughton with the exception of the eastern part of the town. Since 2000 the Town Council has largely been dominated by independent Loughton Residents Association Councillors. In the period between 1950 and 2004, the Labour Party predominated in the east of the town, but lost all their District seats there to the BNP in 2004–06. This part of Loughton became for a few years one of the strongholds of the BNP nationally.

At district council level, Loughton has been represented since re-warding in 2002 by two Councillors from each of the 7 wards, one elected in every even year for a four-year term. After the 2008 elections, six of these were from the Loughton Residents Association, four British National Party, three Conservative and one Independent. However, at the 2010 elections, LRA made substantial gains, deposing a Conservative party cabinet member in one ward, one further Conservative, and three candidates from the British National Party, reducing that organisation to a lone member. The LRA made these gains despite the election being held on the same day as a General Election that gave rise to huge Conservative gains nationally. An LRA Councillor had also defected in April to the Conservatives. In the 2012 election, when seven district seats were contested, a further two seats were won by the LRA, one gained from the Conservatives and one from the BNP, whose incumbent candidate polled only 94 votes. The composition of district members from Loughton was thus LRA 12, Conservative 1, and independent 1, and the BNP lost all representation in the town. In the 2014 election, all six LRA seats were retained, with proportion of the vote ranging from 41% to 70%, and the independent retained his with over 80%. The LRA gained the last conservative held seat after the longstanding incumbent stood down in the 2016 election. There was no change at the 2018 or 2021 District elections. The 2021 town election was the first in which there was no Labour councillor elected.

At county council level, Loughton is split. One division (Central) is entirely within Loughton, the others are combined with wards from neighbouring towns, Buckhurst Hill & Loughton South, Chigwell & Loughton Broadway. Each returns one councillor elected for a four-year term. In the 2017 Essex County Council election, Loughton Central division was won with 70% of the vote by Dr Chris Pond (Independent Loughton Residents Association), Chigwell & Loughton Broadway division by Gagan Mohindra (Conservative), and Buckhurst Hill & Loughton South by Valerie Metcalfe (Conservative). Similar results obtained in 2021.

Loughton forms part of the Epping Forest parliamentary constituency, which is regarded as a safe Conservative seat.

== Chairmen of Loughton Urban District Council ==
- 1900–01 – Rev J.W. Maitland
- 1901–02 – J.H. Gould
- 1902–04 – Charles Foster
- 1904–06 – Arthur Leech
- 1906–08 – J.H. Gould
- 1908–09 – Charles Foster
- 1909–10 – Joseph Lowrey (later Sir Joseph Lowrey)
- 1910–12 – Henry G. Sharp
- 1912–14 – John Herd
- 1914–16 – Duncan Davey
- 1916–18 – Dr Berthon Pendred
- 1918–20 – Percy Thompson
- 1920–22 – Charles Jacobs
- 1922–25 – Frank Foster (later Sir Frank Foster)
- 1925–26 – Arthur Leech
- 1926–27 – Henry G. Sharp
- 1927–28 – Dr Berthon Pendred
- 1928–29 – Charles Jacobs
- 1929–30 – Bernard Farmborough Howard
- 1931–32 – William Nelson Wyles
- 1932–33 – Bernard Farmborough Howard

== Chairmen and Vice-Chairmen of Loughton Town Council, 1996—2004 ==
Year	Chairman	Vice-chairman
1996–97	Stephen Murray	Bob Wilmot
1997–98	Christopher Pond	Monty Juniper
1998–99	Monty Juniper	Judith Woodman
1999–2000	Judith Woodman	Frank Marshall
2000–01	Stephen Murray	Suzanne Harper
2001–02	Suzanne Harper	Joan Davis
2002–03	Joan Davis	Roger Pearce
2003–04	Roger Pearce	Tom Owen

== Town Mayors and Deputy Town Mayors of Loughton, 2004—present ==
Year	Mayor	Deputy Mayor
2004–05	Christopher Pond	Mike Wardle
2005–06	Mike Wardle	Janet Woods
2006–07	Janet Woods	Suzanne Harper
2007–08	Suzanne Harper	Peter Sheen
2008–09	Christopher Pond	Ken Angold-Stephens
2009–10	Ken Angold-Stephens	David Wixley
2010–11	David Wixley	Caroline Pond
2011–12	Caroline Pond	Stephen Pewsey
2012–13	Stephen Pewsey	Jill Angold-Stephens
2013-14	Jill Angold-Stephens	Sharon Weston
2014-15	Sharon Weston	Judy Jennings
2015-16	Judy Jennings	Carol Davies
2016-17	Carol Davies	Philip Abraham
2017-18	Philip Abraham	Stephen Murray
2018-19	Stephen Murray	Stella Murphy
2019-21	Stella Murphy	Tessa Cochrane
2021-22	Rose Brookes	Barbara Cohen
2022-23	Barbara Cohen	Michael Stubbings
2023-24	Michael Stubbings	Katie Valentine
2024-25	Katie Valentine	Les House
2025-26	David Wixley	Stephen Harriman

== Political composition of Loughton Town Council after each election, 1996—present ==
Party	1996	2000	2004	2008	2012	2016	2021
BNP	0	0	0	5	0	0	0
Conservative	0	0	2	1	1	0	0
Independent	0	0	0	1	1	1	1
Labour	12	11	4	1	2	1	0
Loughton Residents Association	10	11	16	14	18	20	21

- 2003 — two Labour councillors resigned from the party and continued as Independents, at which time the LRA assumed control of the council.
- December 2009 — following by-election on 10 December 2009 caused by resignation of BNP councillor, seat won by Loughton Residents Association.
- April 2010 — one vacancy caused by the resignation of an LRA councillor in April that year. Filled on 30 June 2010 by cooption of a candidate from the Loughton Residents Association.
- December 2010 — death of an LRA councillor. Vacancy filled by co-option from the LRA. A BNP councillor was ejected from the party and continued to sit as an independent.
- (2021 election postponed from 2020 owing to epidemic.)
