= 2011 Epping Forest District Council election =

2011 UK local government election

- 5 May 2011

18 of 58 seats on Epping Forest District Council 30 seats needed for a majority
- Turnout: 39.0% (▼28.0%)
| | First party | Second party | Third party |
|---|---|---|---|
| Leader | Diana Collins (Outgoing) | Caroline Pond | Jon Whitehouse |
| Party | Conservative | Loughton Residents | Liberal Democrats |
| Leader's seat | Passingford | Loughton St. John's | Epping Hemnall |
| Last election | 37 seats, 44.4% | 10 seats, 12.0% | 7 seats, 26.8% |
| Seats before | 36 | 10 | 7 |
| Seats won | 37 | 10 | 6 |
| Seat change | ▲1 | N/A | ▼1 |
| Popular vote | 12,274 | N/A | 3,896 |
| Percentage | 56.6% | N/A | 18.0% |
| Swing | ▲12.2% | N/A | ▼8.8% |
| | Fourth party | Fifth party | Sixth party |
| Leader | N/A | Peter Gode | Patricia Richardson |
| Party | Independent | Labour | BNP |
| Leader's seat | N/A | Shelley | Loughton Fairmead |
| Last election | 2 seats, 4.4% | 1 seat, 3.9% | 1 seat, 2.2% |
| Seats before | 3 | 1 | 1 |
| Seats won | 3 | 1 | 1 |
| Seat change | Steady | Steady | N/A |
| Popular vote | 900 | 1,939 | N/A |
| Percentage | 4.1% | 8.9% | N/A |
| Swing | ▼0.3% | ▲5.0% | N/A |
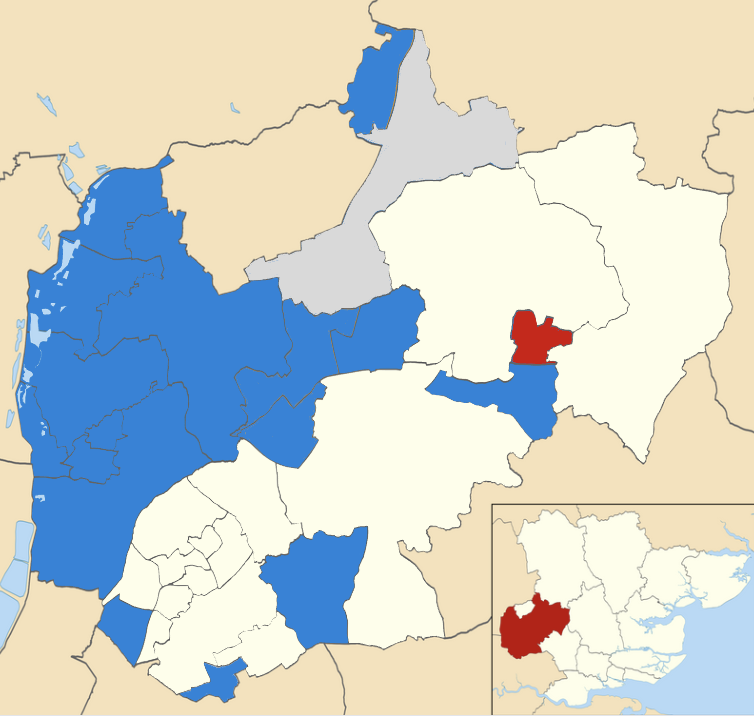
- Results of the 2011 District Council elections

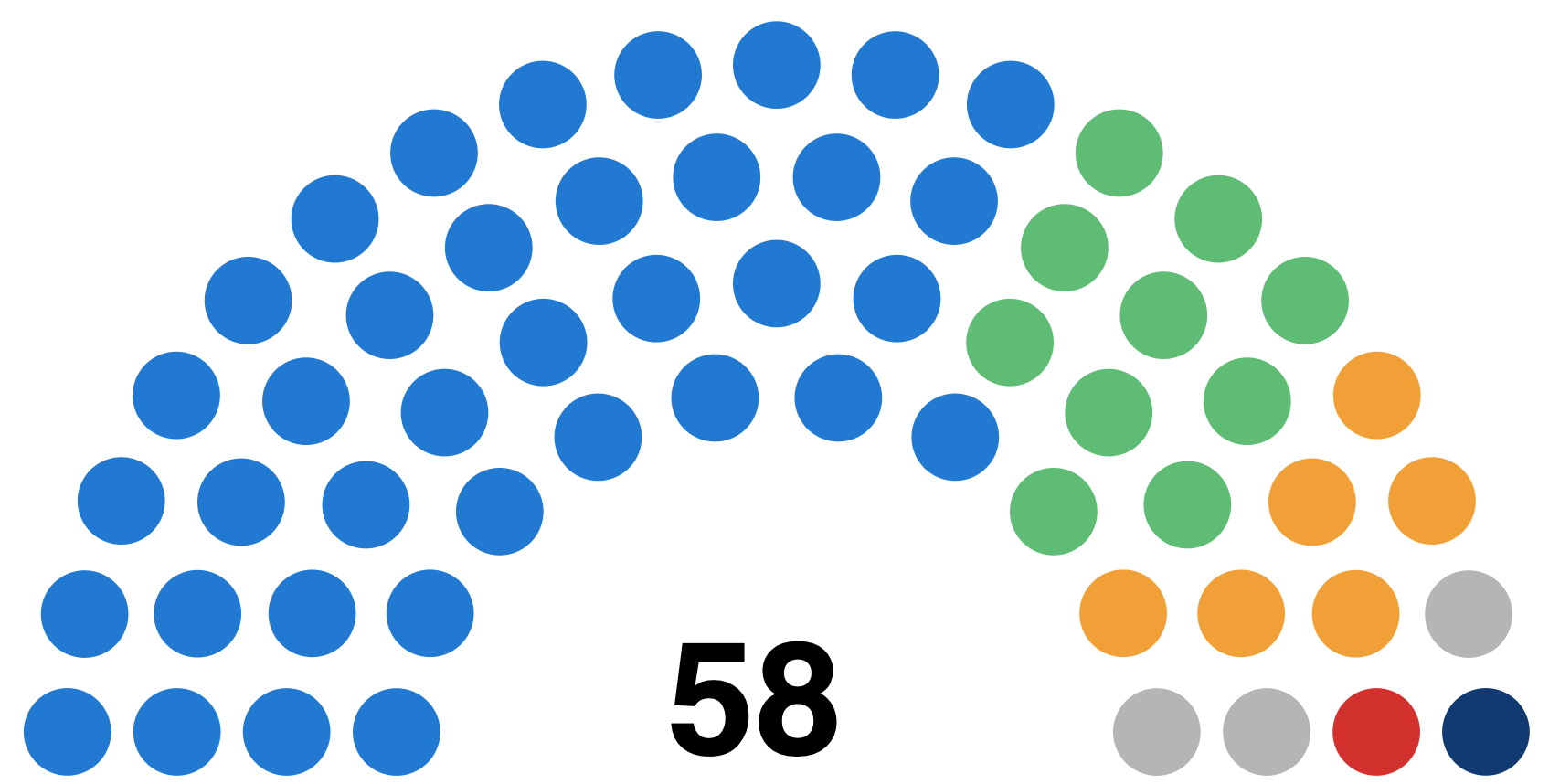
- Council seat composition after the election
Council control before election
Conservative
Council control after election
Conservative

The 2011 Epping Forest District Council election was held on 5 May 2011 to elect members of Epping Forest Council in England as part of the wider local elections in England and Northern Ireland.

One-third of the seats were up for election. No vote was held in Buckhurst Hill East, Chigwell Row, Chigwell Village, High Ongar, Willingale and The Rodings, the Loughton wards, Moreton and Fyfield, Passingford or Theydon Bois.

== Ward results ==
=== Broadley Common, Epping Upland and Nazeing ===
Broadley Common, Epping Upland and Nazeing
| Party | Candidate | Votes | % | ±% |
|---|---|---|---|---|
| Conservative | Penny Smith | 585 | 83.9 | −2.3 |
| Green | Christopher Robert Ogle | 69 | 9.9 | N/A |
| Liberal Democrats | Neil Woollcott | 43 | 6.2 | −7.6 |
| Majority | | 516 | 74.0 | +1.6 |
| Turnout | | 697 | 43.0 | |
| Conservative hold | | Swing | | |

=== Buckhurst Hill West ===
Buckhurst Hill West
| Party | Candidate | Votes | % | ±% |
|---|---|---|---|---|
| Conservative | Haluk Ulkun | 1,211 | 50.7 | +3.5 |
| Liberal Democrats | Patricia Wiltshire | 793 | 33.2 | −12.7 |
| Green | Benjamin Wille | 163 | 6.8 | +3.9 |
| UKIP | Gerard Wadsworth | 162 | 6.8 | +2.8 |
| Independent | Andrew Forsey | 61 | 2.6 | N/A |
| Majority | | 418 | 17.4 | +16.1 |
| Turnout | | 2,390 | 46.0 | −26.0 |
| Conservative hold | | Swing | | |

=== Chipping Ongar, Greensted and Marden Ash ===
Chipping Ongar, Greensted and Marden Ash
| Party | Candidate | Votes | % | ±% |
|---|---|---|---|---|
| Conservative | Paul Keska | 669 | 42.8 | +7.4 |
| Liberal Democrats | Brian Surtees | 491 | 31.4 | −7.7 |
| Labour | Roger McNulty | 155 | 9.9 | N/A |
| English Democrat | Robin Tilbrook | 148 | 9.5 | +1.5 |
| Green | Jeremy Barnecutt | 99 | 6.3 | −2.8 |
| Majority | | 178 | 11.3 | +10.6 |
| Turnout | | 1,562 | 48.0 | −25.0 |
| Conservative hold | | Swing | | |

=== Epping Hemnall ===
Epping Hemnall
| Party | Candidate | Votes | % | ±% |
|---|---|---|---|---|
| Conservative | Ken Avey | 951 | 41.9 | +3.5 |
| Liberal Democrats | Simon Hughes | 821 | 36.2 | −10.3 |
| Labour | Simon Bullough | 231 | 10.2 | +3.5 |
| UKIP | Andrew Smith | 185 | 8.1 | +1.5 |
| Green | Vikki Meier | 83 | 3.7 | +1.9 |
| Majority | | 130 | 5.7 | −2.4 |
| Turnout | | 2,086 | 46.0 | −26.0 |
| Conservative gain from Liberal Democrats | | Swing | | |

=== Epping Lindsey and Thornwood Common ===
Epping Lindsey and Thornwood Common
| Party | Candidate | Votes | % | ±% |
|---|---|---|---|---|
| Conservative | Sarah Packford | 1,047 | 49.1 | −0.2 |
| Labour | Steve Harding | 430 | 20.2 | +10.3 |
| Liberal Democrats | Lynn Hughes | 366 | 17.2 | −19.7 |
| UKIP | Mick McGough | 190 | 8.9 | N/A |
| Green | John Hart | 99 | 4.6 | +0.7 |
| Majority | | 617 | 28.9 | +16.5 |
| Turnout | | 2,132 | 43.0 | −28.0 |
| Conservative hold | | Swing | | |

=== Grange Hill ===
Grange Hill
| Party | Candidate | Votes | % | ±% |
|---|---|---|---|---|
| Conservative | Kewel Singh Chana | 866 | 60.6 | +5.9 |
| Liberal Democrats | Peter Sinfield | 346 | 24.2 | −14.1 |
| Green | Siobhan Crompton | 216 | 15.1 | −8.1 |
| Majority | | 520 | 36.4 | +20.0 |
| Turnout | | 2,132 | 43.0 | −28.0 |
| Conservative hold | | Swing | | |

=== Hastingwood, Matching and Sheering Village ===
Hastingwood, Matching and Sheering Village
| Party | Candidate | Votes | % | ±% |
|---|---|---|---|---|
| Independent | Richard Morgan | 654 | 87.4 | N/A |
| Green | Simon Pepper | 94 | 12.6 | N/A |
| Majority | | 560 | 51.0 | N/A |
| Turnout | | 748 | 45.0 | N/A |
| Independent hold | | Swing | | |

=== Lambourne ===
Lambourne
| Party | Candidate | Votes | % | ±% |
|---|---|---|---|---|
| Conservative | Brian Rolfe | 517 | 80.0 | −5.6 |
| Green | Chris Lord | 78 | 12.1 | N/A |
| Liberal Democrats | George Howard | 51 | 7.9 | −6.5 |
| Majority | | 439 | 67.9 | −3.3 |
| Turnout | | 646 | 42.0 | |
| Conservative hold | | Swing | | |

=== Lower Nazeing ===
Lower Nazeing
| Party | Candidate | Votes | % | ±% |
|---|---|---|---|---|
| Conservative | Richard Bassett | 879 | 69.4 | +2.8 |
| Labour | Kelvin Morris | 198 | 15.6 | +3.2 |
| UKIP | Martin Harvey | 131 | 10.3 | N/A |
| Green | Alison Garnham | 58 | 4.6 | +2.8 |
| Majority | | 681 | 53.8 | −0.4 |
| Turnout | | 1,266 | 39.0 | −30.0 |
| Conservative hold | | Swing | | |

=== Lower Sheering ===
Lower Sheering
| Party | Candidate | Votes | % | ±% |
|---|---|---|---|---|
| Conservative | Gary Waller | 420 | 56.7 | −19.0 |
| Independent | Charlotte Edwards | 185 | 25.0 | N/A |
| Liberal Democrats | Shana-Simone Le'Fey | 87 | 11.7 | −12.6 |
| Green | Hans-Joachim Lukesch | 49 | 6.6 | N/A |
| Majority | | 235 | 31.7 | −19.7 |
| Turnout | | 741 | 43.0 | |
| Conservative hold | | Swing | | |

=== North Weald Bassett ===
Lower Nazeing
| Party | Candidate | Votes | % | ±% |
|---|---|---|---|---|
| Conservative | Anne Grigg | 1,064 | 76.6 | +5.1 |
| Green | Nicola Barnecutt | 213 | 15.3 | −6.4 |
| Liberal Democrats | Ingrid Black | 112 | 8.1 | −1.3 |
| Majority | | 851 | 61.3 | +11.5 |
| Turnout | | 1,389 | 39.0 | −28.0 |
| Conservative hold | | Swing | | |

=== Roydon ===
Roydon
| Party | Candidate | Votes | % | ±% |
|---|---|---|---|---|
| Conservative | Mary Sartin | 580 | 75.3 | −0.5 |
| Labour | Colin Riches | 156 | 20.3 | +3.1 |
| Green | Daniel Kieve | 34 | 4.4 | −2.6 |
| Majority | | 424 | 55.0 | −3.6 |
| Turnout | | 770 | 44.0 | |
| Conservative hold | | Swing | | |

=== Shelley ===
Shelley
| Party | Candidate | Votes | % | ±% |
|---|---|---|---|---|
| Labour | Peter Gode | 242 | 45.1 | +7.3 |
| Conservative | Angus Taylor | 236 | 43.9 | +11.7 |
| Green | Stella Harries | 59 | 11.0 | N/A |
| Majority | | 6 | 1.2 | −4.4 |
| Turnout | | 537 | 32.0 | |
| Labour hold | | Swing | | |

=== Waltham Abbey High Beech ===
Waltham Abbey High Beech
| Party | Candidate | Votes | % | ±% |
|---|---|---|---|---|
| Conservative | Syd Stavrou | 549 | 78.1 | −8.6 |
| Green | James Coombes | 80 | 11.4 | N/A |
| Liberal Democrats | Peter Fuller | 74 | 10.5 | −2.8 |
| Majority | | 469 | 66.7 | −6.7 |
| Turnout | | 703 | 40.0 | |
| Conservative hold | | Swing | | |

=== Waltham Abbey Honey Lane ===
Waltham Abbey Honey Lane
| Party | Candidate | Votes | % | ±% |
|---|---|---|---|---|
| Conservative | Antony Watts | 943 | 65.7 | +4.2 |
| Labour | Angela Ayre | 278 | 19.4 | N/A |
| Liberal Democrats | Philip Chadburn | 112 | 7.8 | −22.7 |
| Green | Andrew Alcock | 103 | 7.2 | −0.9 |
| Majority | | 665 | 46.3 | +15.3 |
| Turnout | | 1,436 | 31.0 | −27.0 |
| Conservative hold | | Swing | | |

=== Waltham Abbey North East ===
Waltham Abbey North East
| Party | Candidate | Votes | % | ±% |
|---|---|---|---|---|
| Conservative | Lillian Mitchell | 647 | 53.2 | −11.0 |
| Liberal Democrats | Pat Richardson | 463 | 38.0 | −2.2 |
| Green | Christopher Kiteley | 107 | 8.8 | N/A |
| Majority | | 184 | 15.2 | +13.2 |
| Turnout | | 1,217 | 38.0 | |
| Conservative gain from Liberal Democrats | | Swing | | |

=== Waltham Abbey Paternoster ===
Waltham Abbey Paternoster
| Party | Candidate | Votes | % | ±% |
|---|---|---|---|---|
| Conservative | Liz Webster | 518 | 59.2 | −0.9 |
| Labour | Robert Greyson | 249 | 28.5 | N/A |
| Green | Pauline Gradden | 81 | 9.3 | −1.1 |
| Liberal Democrats | Bhupendra Patel | 27 | 3.1 | −28.2 |
| Majority | | 269 | 30.7 | +3.7 |
| Turnout | | 848 | 26.0 | −28.0 |
| Conservative hold | | Swing | | |

=== Waltham Abbey South West ===
Waltham Abbey South West
| Party | Candidate | Votes | % | ±% |
|---|---|---|---|---|
| Conservative | Ricki Gadsby | 592 | 67.1 | +1.3 |
| Green | Jessica Barnecutt | 180 | 20,4 | N/A |
| Liberal Democrats | Arnold Verrall | 110 | 12.5 | −9.0 |
| Majority | | 412 | 46.7 | +2.4 |
| Turnout | | 882 | 29.0 | |
| Conservative hold | | Swing | | |
