= 2021 Epping Forest District Council election =

2021 UK local government election

- 6 May 2021

21 of 58 seats on Epping Forest District Council 30 seats needed for a majority
- Turnout: 34.6% (▲7.8%)
	First party	Second party	Third party
Leader	Chris Whitbread	Caroline Pond	Jon Whitehouse
Party	Conservative	Loughton Residents	Liberal Democrats
Leader's seat	Epping Lindsey & Thornwood Common	Loughton St. John's	Epping Hemnall
Last election	37 seats, 50.4%	13 seats, 26.6%	3 seats, 26.2%
Seats before	36	13	3
Seats won	36	13	3
Seat change	▼1	Steady	Steady
Popular vote	13,153	4,943	3,097
Percentage	48.1%	18.0%	11.3%
Swing	▼2.3%	▼8.6%	▼14.9%
	Fourth party	Fifth party	Sixth party
Leader	Steven Neville	N/A	Julian Leppert
Party	Green	Independent	For Britain
Leader's seat	Buckhurst Hill East	N/A	Waltham Abbey Paternoster
Last election	3 seats, 6.4%	1 seat, 1.9%	1 seat, 3.7%
Seats before	3	2 (Note: Deborah Barlow left the Conservatives in 2021)	1
Seats won	3	2	1
Seat change	Steady	▲1	Steady
Popular vote	1,816	131	359
Percentage	6.6%	0.5%	1.3%
Swing	▲0.2%	▼1.4%	▼2.4%
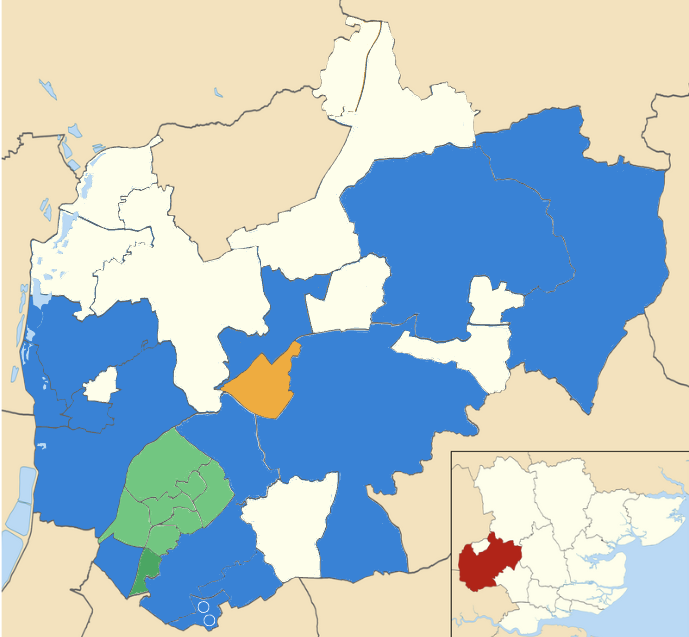
- Map showing the results of the 2021 Epping Forest District Council election

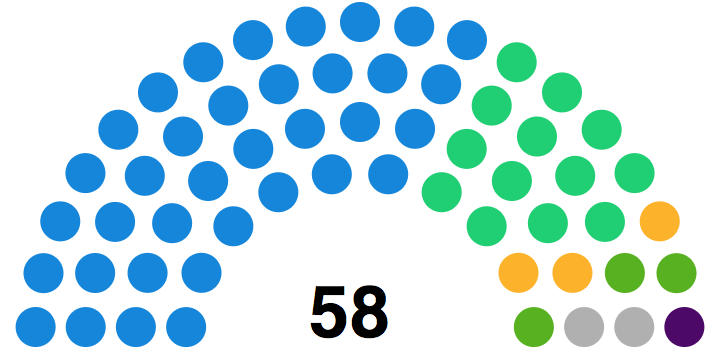
- Council composition following the election
Council control before election
Conservative
Council control after election
Conservative

The 2021 Epping Forest District Council election took place on 6 May 2021 to elect members of Epping Forest District Council in England on the same day as other local elections.

This election marked the first time in over 22 years that the Labour Party have stood in every ward. The For Britain Movement stood in 3 out of 4 of the Waltham Abbey seats. Reform UK also stood for the first time in Moreton and Fyfield.

There was little change in Epping Forest's political makeup. The Conservatives cemented their position as the largest party in the district taking 14 seats, 11 of which were holds and 3 were vacant seat wins.

The Loughton Residents Association had a strong showing, dominating voting in all Loughton wards up for election, despite losing their vote share. The Liberal Democrats suffered their largest loss in the percentage of the vote in the district council's history.

Despite Labour winning their largest share of the vote in the district since 2000, they failed to gain any seats. Angela Ayre, secretary of the Epping Forest Labour Party stated they are "committed to becoming a power to be reckoned with in Epping Forest".

== Results summary ==
2021 Epping Forest District Council election
Party	This election			Full council			This election		
Party	Seats	Net	Seats %	Other	Total	Total %	Votes	Votes %	+/−
Conservative	13	▼1	56.5	23	36	62.1	13,153	48.2	-2.4
Loughton Residents	7	Steady	30.4	6	13	22.4	4,943	18.1	New
Liberal Democrats	2	▲1	8.7	2	4	6.9	3,097	11.3	-15.0
Green	1	Steady	4.3	2	3	5.2	1,816	6.6	+0.1
For Britain	0	Steady	0.0	2	2	3.4	359	1.3	-2.5
Labour	0	Steady	0.0	0	0	0.0	3,635	13.3	+5.9
Independent	0	Steady	0.0	0	0	0.0	131	0.5	-2.4
Young People's	0	Steady	0.0	0	0	0.0	88	0.3	New
Reform	0	Steady	0.0	0	0	0.0	46	0.2	New
English Democrat	0	Steady	0.0	0	0	0.0	43	0.2	-0.9

== Ward results ==
=== Buckhurst Hill East ===
Buckhurst Hill East
Party	Candidate	Votes	%	±%
Green	Simon Heap	753	54.4	▼14.4
Conservative	Smruti Patel	514	37.1	▲9.2
Labour	Alain Laviolette	115	8.2	N/A
Majority		239	17.3	▼3.0
Turnout		1,382	38.9	▼4.1
Green hold		Swing		

=== Buckhurst Hill West ===
Buckhurst Hill West
Party	Candidate	Votes	%	±%
Conservative	Kenneth Williamson	1,228	57.5	▲9.8
Green	Anne Redelinghuys	351	16.4	N/A
Labour	Onike Gollo	238	11.1	▲5.0
Liberal Democrats	Ish Singh	200	9.3	▼34.2
Young People's	Thomas Hall	88	4.1	▲1.7
Majority		877	41.1	▲36.9
Turnout		2,135	40.1	▲2.1
Conservative hold		Swing		

=== Chigwell Row ===
Chigwell Row
Party	Candidate	Votes	%	±%
Conservative	Pranav Bhanot	586	80.0	▲17.1
Labour	Nicola Fuller	98	13.3	N/A
Liberal Democrats	Steve Hume	48	6.5	▼23.3
Majority		388	66.7	▲19.8
Turnout		732	40.1	▲8.1
Conservative hold		Swing		

=== Chigwell Village ===
Chigwell Village
Party	Candidate	Votes	%	±%
Conservative	Kaz Rizvi	807	70.4	▼6.6
Labour	André Boutall	187	16.3	▲4.6
Green	Alison Garnham	151	13.2	▲6.6
Majority		620	54.1	▼11.2
Turnout		1,145	33.2	▲4.2
Conservative hold		Swing		

=== Epping Hemnall ===
Epping Hemnall
Party	Candidate	Votes	%	±%
Liberal Democrats	Jon Whitehouse	1,290	60.8	▼1.9
Conservative	Simon Baker	688	32.4	▲0.2
Labour	Inez Collier	142	6.6	▲1.6
Majority		602	28.4	▼2.1
Turnout		2,120	42.8	▲7.8
Liberal Democrats hold		Swing		

=== Epping Lindsey & Thornwood Common ===
Epping Lindsey and Thornwood Common
Party	Candidate	Votes	%	±%
Conservative	Holly Whitbread	1,316	58.6	▲12.6
Liberal Democrats	Nick Read	698	31.0	▼10.8
Labour	Simon Bullough	231	10.2	▲4.0
Majority		618	27.6	▲23.4
Turnout		2,245	41.8	▲6.8
Conservative hold		Swing		

=== Grange Hill ===
Grange Hill
Party	Candidate	Votes	%	±%
Conservative	Deborah Barlow	850	55.4	
Conservative	Alan Lion	744	48.5	
Labour	Cristinel Birzu	297	19.4	
Labour	Sam Tankard	276	18.0	
Green	Rebecca Fricker	186	12.1	N/A
Liberal Democrats	Peter Sinfield	125	8.2	N/A
Majority		553	29.1	
Turnout		1,533	30	▲9.0
Conservative hold		Swing		
Conservative hold		Swing		

=== High Ongar, Willingale and the Rodings ===
High Ongar, Willingale and the Rodings
Party	Candidate	Votes	%	±%
Conservative	Raymond Balcombe	522	79.0	▲7.5
Labour	Alison Wingfield	50	7.5	N/A
Liberal Democrats	Elaine Thatcher	46	6.9	N/A
English Democrat	Robin Tilbrook	43	6.5	▼1.0
Majority		472	71.5	▲20.1
Turnout		661	34.5	▲8.5
Conservative hold		Swing		

=== Loughton Alderton ===
Loughton Alderton
Party	Candidate	Votes	%	±%
Loughton Residents	Chidi Nweke	533	58.7	▲6.7
Conservative	Jan Ridding	205	18.7	▲1.7
Labour	Angela Ayre	170	18.7	▲0.2
Majority		328	36.0	▼9.9
Turnout		908	26.5	▼0.5
Loughton Residents hold		Swing		

=== Loughton Broadway ===
Loughton Broadway
Party	Candidate	Votes	%	±%
Loughton Residents	Michael Owen	435	53.9	▲14.5
Labour	Debbie Wild	185	22.9	▲12.7
Conservative	George Bose	161	20.0	▲12.7
For Britain	Edward Butler	26	3.2	N/A
Majority		250	54.0	▲24.8
Turnout		807	23.1	▼3.9
Loughton Residents hold		Swing		

=== Loughton Fairmead ===
Loughton Fairmead
Party	Candidate	Votes	%	±%
Loughton Residents	David Wixley	569	63.4	▼8.6
Labour	Paul Thomas	175	19.5	▲5.4
Conservative	Meena Patel	153	17.0	▲3.3
Majority		394	43.9	▼14.0
Turnout		897	27.4	▼1.6
Loughton Residents hold		Swing		

=== Loughton Forest ===
Loughton Forest
Party	Candidate	Votes	%	±%
Loughton Residents	Jayna Jogia	757	56.1	▲1.5
Conservative	Tim Parry	466	34.5	▼4.5
Labour	Emma Roberts	125	9.2	▲2.4
Majority		291	21.6	▲6.2
Turnout		1,348	39.7	▲2.7
Loughton Residents hold		Swing		

=== Loughton Roding ===
Loughton Roding
Party	Candidate	Votes	%	±%
Loughton Residents	Rose Brooks	858	67.3	▼4.3
Conservative	Katharine Hawes	253	19.8	▼0.2
Labour	Gareth Rawlings	162	12.7	▲4.4
Majority		605	47.5	▼4.1
Turnout		1,273	35.2	▲0.2
Loughton Residents hold		Swing		

=== Loughton St. John's ===
Loughton St Johns
Party	Candidate	Votes	%	±%
Loughton Residents	Caroline Pond	901	67.8	▼3.8
Conservative	Bob Church	296	22.2	▲2.2
Labour	Jill Bostock	131	9.8	▲1.5
Majority		605	45.6	▼6.0
Turnout		1,328	38.3	▲3.3
Loughton Residents hold		Swing		

=== Loughton St. Mary's ===
Loughton St. Mary's
Party	Candidate	Votes	%	±%
Loughton Residents	Judy Jennings	890	62.7	▼2.9
Conservative	Jonathan Hunter	313	22.0	▲0.6
Labour	Ross Burrell	167	11.7	▲3.1
Liberal Democrats	Naomi Davies	49	3.4	▼0.8
Majority		577	40.6	▼3.6
Turnout		1,419	36.1	▲3.1
Loughton Residents hold		Swing		

=== Moreton & Fyfield ===
Moreton & Fyfield
Party	Candidate	Votes	%	±%
Conservative	Ian Hadley	476	78.5	▲3.0
Reform	Peter Bell	46	7.5	N/A
Liberal Democrats	Richard Griffiths	46	7.5	N/A
Labour	Zidan Abou-Harb	38	6.2	N/A
Majority		430	71.0	▲20.1
Turnout		606	35.4	▲4.4
Conservative hold		Swing		

=== Passingford ===
Passingford
Party	Candidate	Votes	%	±%
Conservative	Heather Brady	504	79.8	▼20.2
Labour	James Murchison	68	10.7	N/A
Liberal Democrats	Edward Barnard	61	9.6	N/A
Majority		436	68.9	N/A
Turnout		633	32.0	N/A
Conservative hold		Swing		

=== Theydon Bois ===
Theydon Bois
Party	Candidate	Votes	%	±%
Conservative	John Phillip	881	59.6	▼4.6
Liberal Democrats	Clive Amos	512	34.6	▲9.2
Labour	Peter Pendle	84	5.6	▼4.7
Majority		369	25.0	▼13.8
Turnout		1,477	44.8	▲8.8
Conservative hold		Swing		

=== Waltham Abbey High Beach ===
Waltham Abbey High Beach
Party	Candidate	Votes	%	±%
Conservative	Tim Matthews	401	63.8	▲3.9
Independent	Paul Morris	131	20.8	▲1.3
Labour	Clover Colquhoun	96	15.2	N/A
Majority		270	43.0	▲3.6
Turnout		628	30.9	▲5.9
Conservative hold		Swing		

=== Waltham Abbey Honey Lane ===
Waltham Abbey Honey Lane
Party	Candidate	Votes	%	±%
Conservative	Steven Heather	605	45.4	▲5.2
Labour	Robert Greyson	256	19.2	▲3.1
For Britain	Pat Richardson	242	18.1	▼4.9
Green	Liam Lakes	229	17.1	▲3.8
Majority		359	26.2	▲9.0
Turnout		1,332	29.0	▲6.0
Conservative hold		Swing		

=== Waltham Abbey North East ===
Waltham Abbey North East
Party	Candidate	Votes	%	±%
Conservative	Jeane Lea	615	63.7	▲3.2
Labour	David Moss	181	18.7	N/A
Green	Carina Hill	103	10.6	▼13.5
For Britain	Sue Butler	43	4.4	N/A
Liberal Democrats	Timothy Vaughan	22	2.2	▼13.1
Majority		434	45.0	▲8.6
Turnout		964	30.3	▲6.3
Conservative hold		Swing		

=== Waltham Abbey South West ===
Waltham Abbey South West
Party	Candidate	Votes	%	±%
Conservative	Helen Kane	569	69.1	▲31.1
Labour	Sara Hassan	163	19.8	N/A
For Britain	Jim Searle	48	5.8	N/A
Green	Paul Scales	43	5.2	▼56.8
Majority		406	49.3	▲25.3
Turnout		823	24.6	▲0.6
Conservative hold		Swing		
