= 2003 Epping Forest District Council election =

2003 UK local government election

- 1 May 2003

18 of 58 seats on Epping Forest District Council 30 seats needed for a majority
- Turnout: 29.3% (▼1.1%)
	First party	Second party	Third party
Leader	Maggie McEwen	Michael Heavens	Stan Goodwin
Party	Conservative	Liberal Democrats	Labour
Leader's seat	High Ongar, Willingale & the Rodings	Buckhurst Hill West	Loughton Roding
Last election	26 seats, 48.2%	13 seats, 27.7%	9 seats, 12.4%
Seats before	23 (Note: Reg Chidley (Waltham Abbey Paternoster) left the party to become and Independent), then the party lost two by-elections to the Liberal Democrats)	15	9
Seats won	23	16	9
Seat change	▼3	▲3	Steady
Popular vote	7,826	4,863	811
Percentage	52.8%	32.8%	5.5%
Swing	▲4.6%	▲5.1%	▼6.9%
	Fourth party	Fifth party
Leader	Dorothy Paddon	N/A
Party	Loughton Residents	Independent inc. CRA
Leader's seat	Loughton St. Mary's	N/A
Last election	6 seats, 5.9%	4 seats, 5.4%
Seats before	6	5
Seats won	6	4 (Note: Daphne Borton (Nazeing), Reg Chidley (Waltham Abbey Paternoster) John Knapman (CRA - Chigwell Village), and Richard Morgan (Hastingwood, Matching and Sheering Village))
Seat change	N/A	Steady
Popular vote	N/A	1,014
Percentage	N/A	6.8%
Swing	N/A	▲1.4%
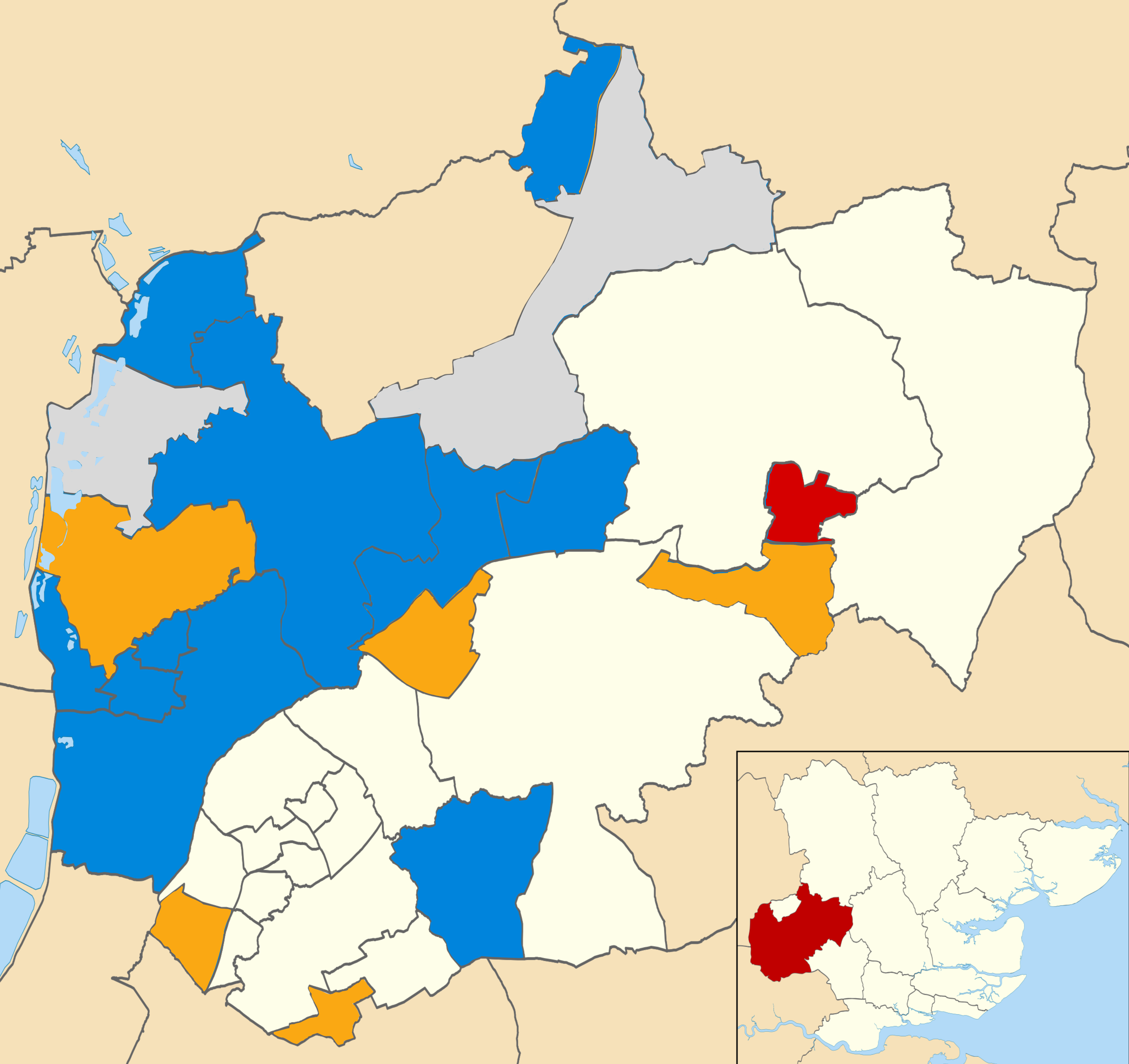
- Results of the 2003 District Council elections
Council control before election
No overall control
Conservative largest party
Council control after election
No overall control
Conservative largest party

Elections to Epping Forest Council were held on 1 May 2003. One third of the council was up for election and the council stayed under no overall control. This election saw the best performance in terms of seats and vote share for the Liberal Democrats.

== By-elections ==
=== Waltham Abbey North East by-election ===
Waltham Abbey North East By-Election 7 November 2002
Party	Candidate	Votes	%	±%
Liberal Democrats	Pat Brooks	463	55.8	▲27.5
Conservative	David Porter	321	38.7	▼33.0
Labour	Fitzherbert Harewood	46	5.5	▲5.5
Majority		142	17.1	▼26.4
Turnout		830	25.7	▼2.8
Liberal Democrats gain from Conservative		Swing		

=== Waltham Abbey South West by-election ===
Waltham Abbey South West By-Election 7 November 2002
Party	Candidate	Votes	%	±%
Liberal Democrats	Philip Chadburn	287	56.5	▲26.7
Conservative	Margaret Williams	172	33.9	▼36.3
Labour	Marion Taylor	49	9.6	▲9.6
Majority		115	21.6	▼17.5
Turnout		508	18.3	▼2.1
Liberal Democrats gain from Conservative		Swing		

== Ward results ==
=== Broadley Common, Epping Upland & Nazeing ===
Broadley Common, Epping Upland & Nazeing
Party	Candidate	Votes	%	±%
Conservative	Penny Smith	389	85.7	▼0.1
Liberal Democrats	Gilbert Graty	65	14.3	▲0.1
Majority		324	71.4	▼0.2
Turnout		454	29.5	▼2.7
Conservative hold		Swing		

=== Buckhurst Hill West ===
Buckhurst Hill West
Party	Candidate	Votes	%	±%
Liberal Democrats	Robert Goold	803	55.8	▲1.4
Conservative	Haluk Ulkun	635	44.2	▼1.4
Majority		168	11.6	▲3.8
Turnout		1,438	29.6	▲3.4
Liberal Democrats hold		Swing		

=== Chipping Ongar, Greensted and Marden Ash ===
Chipping Ongar, Greensted and Marden Ash
Party	Candidate	Votes	%	±%
Liberal Democrats	Keith Wright	576	58.2	▲5.7
Conservative	Glyn Pritchard	413	41.8	▲7.3
Majority		163	16.4	▼1.6
Turnout		989	32.7	▼6.3
Liberal Democrats hold		Swing		

=== Epping Hemnall ===
Epping Hemnall
Party	Candidate	Votes	%	±%
Liberal Democrats	Monica Richardson	666	49.1	▼7.5
Conservative	Jean Ashbridge	593	43.7	▲9.9
Labour	Robert Sheen	98	7.2	▼2.4
Majority		73	5.4	▼4.2
Turnout		1,357	29.1	▼2.5
Liberal Democrats hold		Swing		

=== Epping Lindsey and Thornwood Common ===
Epping Lindsey and Thornwood Common
Party	Candidate	Votes	%	±%
Conservative	Andrew Green	731	47.7	▲8.5
Liberal Democrats	Janet Hedges	574	37.5	▲2.6
Green	Thomas Norris	115	7.5	N/A
Labour	Louis Appiah	111	7.3	▼6.3
Majority		157	10.2	▲5.9
Turnout		1,531	35.3	▼13.9
Conservative hold		Swing		

=== Grange Hill ===
Grange Hill
Party	Candidate	Votes	%	±%
Liberal Democrats	Gavin Stollar	779	60.2	▲10.1
Conservative	Cheryl-Anne Kashket	516	39.8	▼10.1
Majority		263	20.4	▲20.3
Turnout		1,295	28.3	▼5.7
Liberal Democrats hold		Swing		

=== Hastingwood, Matching and Sheering Village ===
Hastingwood, Matching and Sheering Village
Party	Candidate	Votes	%	±%
Independent	Richard Morgan	400	67.5	▲8.1
Conservative	Michael Wright	193	32.5	▼8.1
Majority		207	35.0	▲16.2
Turnout		593	37.1	▲1.6
Independent hold		Swing		

=== Lambourne ===
Lambourne
Party	Candidate	Votes	%	±%
Conservative	Stephen Metcalfe	452	61.5	▲5.8
Labour	Colin Huckle	283	38.5	▼5.8
Majority		169	23.0	▲11.6
Turnout		735	48.6	▲1.5
Conservative hold		Swing		

=== Lower Nazeing ===
Lower Nazeing
Party	Candidate	Votes	%	±%
Independent	Daphne Borton	495	54.6	▲19.2
Conservative	Dennis Ramshaw	262	28.9	▼9.1
UKIP	Martin Harvey	120	13.2	▼0.1
Labour	Kelvin Morris	96	10.6	▲0.8
Liberal Democrats	Peter Spencer	34	3.7	▲0.2
Majority		233	25.7	▲20.1
Turnout		907	32.8	▼9.8
Independent hold		Swing		

=== Lower Sheering ===
Lower Sheering
Party	Candidate	Votes	%	±%
Conservative	John Harrington	207	72.1	▲4.5
Liberal Democrats	Enid Robinson	80	27.9	▲15.4
Majority		127	44.2	▼3.5
Turnout		287	19.5	▼3.4
Conservative hold		Swing		

=== North Weald Bassett ===
North Weald Bassett
Party	Candidate	Votes	%	±%
Conservative	Anne Grigg	677	80.0	Steady
Liberal Democrats	John Rumble	98	11.6	▼8.4
Green	Barry Johns	71	8.4	N/A
Majority		579	68.4	▲8.5
Turnout		846	25.8	▼7.3
Conservative hold		Swing		

=== Roydon ===
Roydon
Party	Candidate	Votes	%	±%
Conservative	Mary Sartin	371	75.7	▲35.3
Independent	Vincent Coen	119	24.3	▼19.1
Majority		252	51.4	▲9.8
Turnout		490	30.5	▼1.1
Conservative gain from Independent		Swing		

=== Shelley ===
Shelley
Party	Candidate	Votes	%	±%
Labour	Peter Gode	223	60.1	▲4.2
Conservative	Frank Love	89	24.0	▼3.7
Liberal Democrats	Brian Surtees	59	15.9	▼0.5
Majority		134	36.1	▲5.9
Turnout		371	27.2	▼2.2
Labour hold		Swing		

=== Waltham Abbey High Beach ===
Waltham Abbey High Beach
Party	Candidate	Votes	%	±%
Conservative	Sydney-Ann Stavrou	456	87.2	▼12.8
Liberal Democrats	Lucille Thompson	67	12.8	N/A
Majority		389	74.4	▼25.6
Turnout		523	31.4	N/A
Conservative hold		Swing		

=== Waltham Abbey Honey Lane ===
Waltham Abbey Honey Lane
Party	Candidate	Votes	%	±%
Conservative	Donald Spinks	626	77.9	▲12.0
Liberal Democrats	Ingrid Black	178	22.1	▼12.0
Majority		448	55.8	▲24.0
Turnout		804	18.4	▼3.6
Conservative hold		Swing		

=== Waltham Abbey North East ===
Waltham Abbey North East
Party	Candidate	Votes	%	±%
Liberal Democrats	Patricia Brooks	476	59.2	▲30.9
Conservative	Antony Watts	328	40.8	▼30.9
Majority		148	18.4	▼25.1
Turnout		804	26.8	▼1.7
Liberal Democrats gain from Conservative		Swing		

=== Waltham Abbey Paternoster ===
Waltham Abbey Paternoster
Party	Candidate	Votes	%	±%
Conservative	Richard Haines	564	83.2	▲19.0
Liberal Democrats	Peter Sinfield	114	16.8	N/A
Majority		450	66.4	▲38.0
Turnout		678	22.4	▼1.8
Conservative hold		Swing		

=== Waltham Abbey South West ===
Waltham Abbey South West
Party	Candidate	Votes	%	±%
Conservative	Ulrike Gadsby	324	52.4	▼17.8
Liberal Democrats	Christine Akers	294	47.6	▼17.8
Majority		30	4.8	▼35.6
Turnout		618	22.7	▲2.3
Conservative hold		Swing		
