= 2022 Epping Forest District Council election =

2022 UK local government election

- 5 May 2022

20 of 58 seats to Epping Forest District Council 30 seats needed for a majority
	First party	Second party	Third party
Leader	Chris Whitbread	Caroline Pond	Jon Whitehouse
Party	Conservative	Loughton Residents	Liberal Democrats
Leader's seat	Epping Lindsey & Thornwood Common	Loughton St. John's	Epping Hemnall
Last election	36 seats, 48.1%	13 seats, 18.0%	3 seats, 11.3%
Seats before	36	13	3
Seats won	35	13	4
Seat change	▼1	Steady	▲1
Popular vote	9,183	3,946	4,172
Percentage	40.3%	17.3%	18.3%
Swing	▼7.9%	▼0.8%	▲7.0%
	Fourth party	Fifth party	Sixth party
Leader	Steven Neville (Outgoing)	None	Julian Leppert
Party	Green	Independent	For Britain
Leader's seat	Buckhurst Hill East	N/A	Waltham Abbey Paternoster
Last election	3 seats, 6.6%	2 seats, 0.5%	1 seat, 1.3%
Seats before	3	2	1
Seats won	3	2	1
Seat change	Steady	Steady	Steady
Popular vote	763	1,348	27
Percentage	3.4%	5.9%	0.1%
Swing	▼3.2%	▲5.4%	▼1.2%
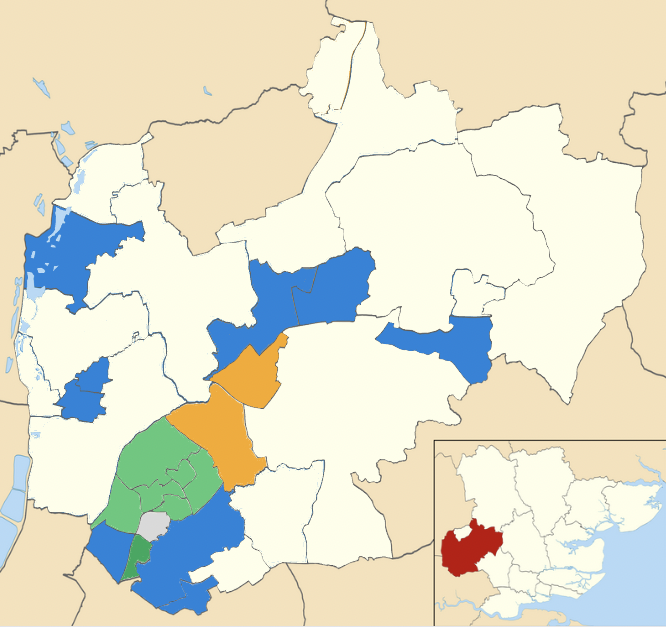
- Map showing the results of the 2022 Epping Forest District Council election (by-election in Waltham Abbey North East not included)
Council control before election
Conservative
Council control after election
Conservative

The 2022 Epping Forest District Council election took place on 5 May 2022 to elect members of Epping Forest District Council in England. This was on the same day as other local elections.

The results were seen as a crucial test for the strength of the Conservative Party in the district following the allegations of Coronavirus rule-breaking in Number 10 by Prime Minister, Boris Johnson.

Before the election, one Conservative councillor had the whip removed from her, whilst a seat was made vacant in Waltham Abbey North East due to the resignation of the previous councillor for that ward.

== Results summary ==
2022 Epping Forest District Council election
Party	This election			Full council			This election		
Party	Seats	Net	Seats %	Other	Total	Total %	Votes	Votes %	+/−
Conservative	10	▼1	50.0	25	35	61.4	9,183	40.3	-7.9
Loughton Residents	6	Steady	30.0	7	13	22.8	3,946	17.3	-0.8
Liberal Democrats	2	▲1	10.0	3	5	8.8	4,172	18.3	+7.0
Green	1	Steady	5.0	2	3	5.3	763	3.4	-3.2
Independent	1	Steady	5.0	0	1	1.8	1,348	5.9	+5.4
Labour	0	Steady	0.0	0	0	0.0	2,997	13.2	-0.1
Young People's	0	Steady	0.0	0	0	0.0	150	0.7	+0.4
TUSC	0	Steady	0.0	0	0	0.0	88	0.4	N/A
English Democrat	0	Steady	0.0	0	0	0.0	72	0.3	+0.1
For Britain	0	Steady	0.0	0	0	0.0	27	0.1	-1.2
Reform	0	Steady	0.0	0	0	0.0	26	0.1	-0.1

== Ward results ==
Detailed below are all of the candidates nominated to stand in each ward in the upcoming election. Figures are compared to the last time these seats were contested in any election cycle for the Epping Forest District Council election.

=== Buckhurst Hill East ===
Buckhurst Hill East
Party	Candidate	Votes	%	±%
Green	Elizabeth-Rose Gabbett	677	62.3	+7.9
Conservative	David Saunders	291	26.8	−10.3
Labour	Alain Jose Laviolette	119	10.9	+2.7
Majority		386	35.5	
Turnout		1,095	31.5	
Green hold		Swing	▲9.1	

=== Buckhurst Hill West ===
Buckhurst Hill West
Party	Candidate	Votes	%	±%
Conservative	Smruti Patel	1,006	58.5	+1.0
Liberal Democrats	Ishvinder Singh Matharu	564	32.8	+23.5
Shared Ground	Thomas Hall	150	8.7	+4.6
Majority		442	25.7	
Turnout		1,741	32.9	
Conservative hold		Swing	▼11.3	

=== Chigwell Village ===
Chigwell Village
Party	Candidate	Votes	%	±%
Conservative	Darshan Sunger	551	49.8	−20.2
Independent	Priten Patel	365	32.4	N/A
Liberal Democrats	Stephen Hume	114	10.1	N/A
Green	Alison Garnham	86	7.6	−5.6
Majority		186	17.4	
Turnout		1,118	32.6	
Conservative hold		Swing	N/A	

=== Chipping Ongar, Greensted and Marden Ash ===
Chipping Ongar, Greensted and Marden Ash
Party	Candidate	Votes	%	±%
Conservative	Basil Vaz	562	58.9	−0.6
Labour	Timothy White	150	15.7	N/A
Liberal Democrats	Naomi Davies	144	15.1	−8.1
English Democrat	Robin Tilbrook	72	7.5	−9.7
Reform	Peter Bell	26	2.7	N/A
Majority		412	43.2	
Turnout		958	28.3	
Conservative hold		Swing	N/A	

=== Epping Hemnall ===
Epping Hemnall
Party	Candidate	Votes	%	±%
Liberal Democrats	Janet Whitehouse	1,149	62.8	+2.0
Conservative	Peter Murray	520	28.4	−4.0
Labour	Inez Collier	161	8.8	+2.2
Majority		629	34.4	
Turnout		1,830	37.6	
Liberal Democrats hold		Swing	▲3.0	

=== Epping Lindsey & Thornwood Common ===
Epping Lindsey and Thornwood Common
Party	Candidate	Votes	%	±%
Conservative	Les Burrows	929	47.2	−11.4
Liberal Democrats	Richard Griffiths	850	43.2	+12.2
Labour	Simon Bullough	190	9.6	−0.6
Majority		79	4.0	
Turnout		1,986	37.7	
Conservative hold		Swing	▼11.8	

=== Grange Hill ===
Grange Hill
Party	Candidate	Votes	%	±%
Conservative	Alan Lion	801	61.4	+3.1
Labour	Sam Tankard	504	38.6	+18.2
Majority		297	22.8	
Turnout		1,317	25.4	
Conservative hold		Swing	▼7.6	

=== Loughton Alderton ===
Loughton Alderton
Party	Candidate	Votes	%	±%
Loughton Residents	Ian Allgood	522	63.9	+5.2
Labour	Angela Ayre	164	20.1	+1.4
Conservative	Jan Ridding	120	14.7	−7.9
For Britain	Eddy Butler	11	1.3	N/A
Majority		358	43.8	
Turnout		817	24.5	
Loughton Residents hold		Swing	▲1.9	

=== Loughton Broadway ===
Loughton Broadway
Party	Candidate	Votes	%	±%
Loughton Residents	Chris Pond	488	61.9	+8.0
Labour	Onike Gollo	178	22.6	−0.3
Conservative	Alan Weinberg	106	13.5	−6.5
For Britain	Pat Richardson	16	2.0	−1.2
Majority		310	39.3	
Turnout		791	23.0	
Loughton Residents hold		Swing	▲4.2	

=== Loughton Fairmead ===
Loughton Fairmead
Party	Candidate	Votes	%	±%
Loughton Residents	Louise Mead	582	68.6	+5.2
Labour	Paul Thomas	178	21.0	+1.5
Conservative	Upen Patel	89	10.5	−6.5
Majority		404	47.6	
Turnout		852	26.9	
Loughton Residents hold		Swing	▲1.9	

=== Loughton Forest ===
Loughton Forest
Party	Candidate	Votes	%	±%
Loughton Residents	Roger Baldwin	748	62.3	+6.2
Conservative	Jeff Probyn	335	27.9	−6.6
Labour	Kenneth Turner	117	9.8	+0.6
Majority		413	34.4	
Turnout		1,202	36.0	
Loughton Residents hold		Swing	▲6.4	

=== Loughton Roding ===
Loughton Roding
Party	Candidate	Votes	%	±%
Independent	Stephen Murray	983	83.2	N/A
Labour	Debbie Wild	116	9.8	−2.9
Conservative	Varun Bhanot	83	7.0	−12.8
Majority		867	73.4	
Turnout		1,188	33.3	
Independent hold		Swing	N/A	

=== Loughton St. John's ===
Loughton St John's
Party	Candidate	Votes	%	±%
Loughton Residents	Bob Jennings	785	67.2	−0.6
Conservative	Bob Church	223	19.1	−3.1
Labour	Jill Bostock	160	13.7	+3.9
Majority		562	48.1	
Turnout		1,171	34.3	
Loughton Residents hold		Swing	▲1.3	

=== Loughton St. Mary's ===
Loughton St. Mary's
Party	Candidate	Votes	%	±%
Loughton Residents	Howard Kauffman	821	68.5	+5.8
Conservative	Katharine Hawes	223	18.6	−3.4
Labour	Gareth Rawlings	155	12.9	+1.2
Majority		598	49.9	
Turnout		1,202	31.3	
Loughton Residents hold		Swing	▲4.6	

=== Lower Nazeing ===
Lower Nazeing
Party	Candidate	Votes	%	±%
Conservative	Rhonda Pugsley	525	69.1	+9.8
Liberal Democrats	Elaine Thatcher	235	30.9	+13.5
Majority		290	38.2	
Turnout		768	22.9	
Conservative hold		Swing	▼1.9	

=== North Weald Bassett ===
North Weald Bassett
Party	Candidate	Votes	%	±%
Conservative	Peter Bolton	635	63.4	+9.9
Labour	Alison Wingfield	194	19.4	N/A
Liberal Democrats	Edward Barnard	173	17.3	−3.5
Majority		441	44.0	
Turnout		1,011	27.8	
Conservative hold		Swing	N/A	

=== Theydon Bois ===
Theydon Bois
Party	Candidate	Votes	%	±%
Liberal Democrats	Clive Amos	648	50.5	+15.9
Conservative	Sue Jones	634	49.5	−10.1
Majority		14	1.0	
Turnout		1,290	40.0	
Liberal Democrats gain from Conservative		Swing	▲13.0	

=== Waltham Abbey Honey Lane ===
Waltham Abbey Honey Lane
Party	Candidate	Votes	%	±%
Conservative	David Stocker	616	58.9	+13.5
Labour	David Moss	365	34.9	+15.7
TUSC	Ian Pattinson	64	6.1	N/A
Majority		251	24.0	
Turnout		1,058	23.7	
Conservative hold		Swing	▼1.1	

=== Waltham Abbey North East ===
This by-election was called due to the resignation of the previous sitting Conservative councillor, Ann Mitchell.

Waltham Abbey North East
Party	Candidate	Votes	%	±%
Conservative	Jodie Lucas	531	64.3	+0.6
Liberal Democrats	Timothy Vaughan	295	35.7	+33.5
Majority		236	28.6	
Turnout		832	26.5	
Conservative hold		Swing	▼16.5	

=== Waltham Abbey Paternoster ===
Waltham Abbey Paternoster
Party	Candidate	Votes	%	±%
Conservative	Shane Yerrell	403	59.9	+31.1
Labour	Robert Greyson	246	36.6	+18.9
TUSC	Bea Gardner	24	3.6	N/A
Majority		157	23.3	
Turnout		678	19.8	
Conservative hold		Swing	▲6.1	

== By-elections ==
=== Waltham Abbey South West ===
Waltham Abbey South West: 14 October 2022
Party	Candidate	Votes	%	±%
Conservative	Joseph Parsons	260	55.2	−13.9
Green	David Plummer	211	44.8	+39.6
Majority		49	10.4	
Turnout		471	14.0	
Conservative gain from Green				
