= 2010 Epping Forest District Council election =

2010 UK local government election

- 6 May 2010

20 of 58 seats on Epping Forest District Council 30 seats needed for a majority
- Turnout: 67.0 (▲28.6%)
	First party	Second party	Third party
Leader	Diana Collins	Caroline Pond	Jon Whitehouse
Party	Conservative	Loughton Residents	Liberal Democrats
Leader's seat	Passingford	Loughton St. John's	Epping Hemnall
Last election	35 seats, 47.0%	6 seats, 15.2%	9 seats, 21.7%
Seats before	35	6	9
Seats won	37	10	7
Seat change	▲2	▲4	▼2
Popular vote	22,360	6,028	13,659
Percentage	44.8%	12.0%	27.3%
Swing	▼2.2%	▼3.2%	▲5.6%
	Fourth party	Fifth party	Sixth party
Leader	N/A	Peter Gode	Patricia Richardson
Party	Independent	Labour	BNP
Leader's seat	N/A	Shelley	Loughton Fairmead
Last election	3 seats	1 seat	4 seats
Seats before	2	1	4
Seats won	2 (Note: Richard Morgan (Hastingwood, Matching and Sheering Village), and Stephen Murray (Loughton Roding))	1	1
Seat change	▼1	Steady	▼3
Popular vote	2,201	1,862	1,111
Percentage	4.4%	3.7%	2.2%
Swing	▲2.1%	▼0.5%	▼6.8%
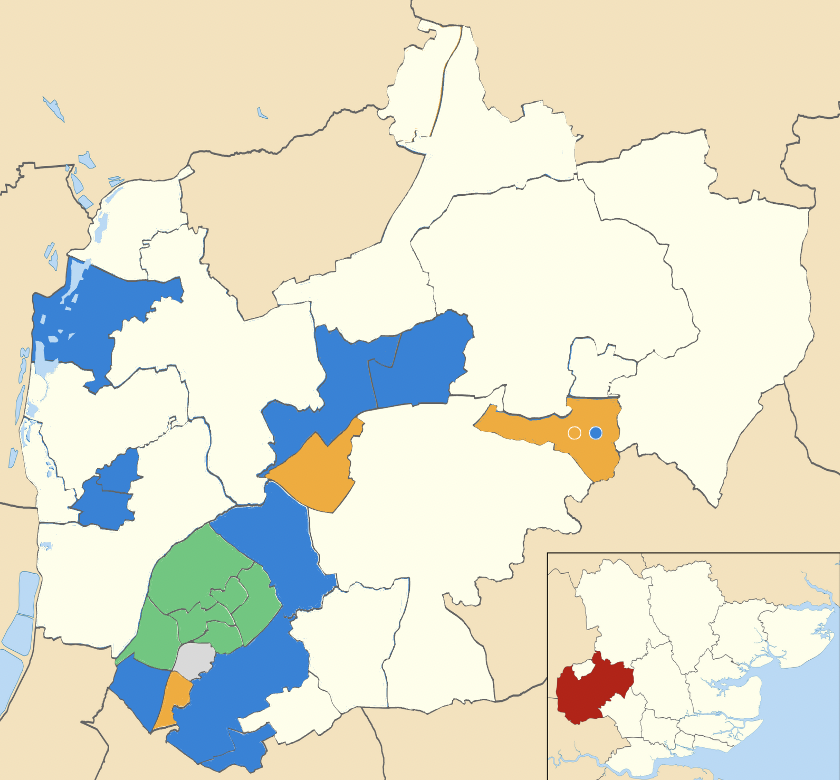
- Results of the 2010 District Council elections

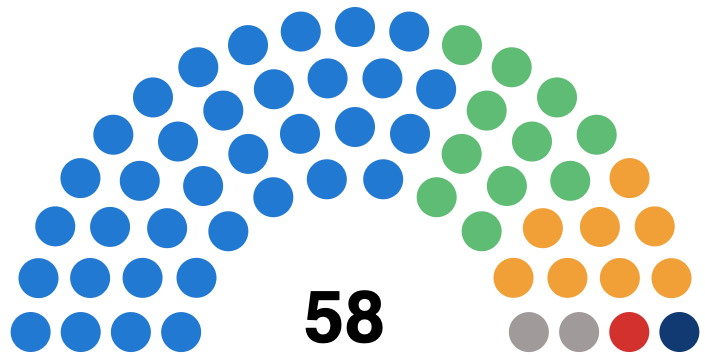
- Council seat composition after the election
Council control before election
Conservative
Council control after election
Conservative

The 2010 Epping Forest District Council election took place on 6 May 2010 to elect members of Epping Forest District Council in England. This was on the same day as the 2010 United Kingdom general election.

== Ward Results ==
Figures are compared to the last time these seats were contested in any election cycle for the Epping Forest District Council election, this is indicated.

=== Buckhurst Hill East ===
Buckhurst Hill East (compared with 2008 results)
Party	Candidate	Votes	%	±%
Liberal Democrats	Peter Spencer	1,136	50.0	▲0.6
Conservative	Marshall Vance	957	42.1	▲1.9
Green	Steven Neville	180	7.9	N/A
Majority		179	7.9	▼1.3
Turnout		2,273	65.8	▲27.2
Liberal Democrats hold		Swing		

=== Buckhurst Hill West ===
Buckhurst Hill West (compared with 2008 results)
Party	Candidate	Votes	%	±%
Conservative	Sylvia Watson	1,827	47.2	▼1.5
Liberal Democrats	Ann Haigh	1,775	45.9	▼5.4
UKIP	Gerard Wadsworth	153	4.0	N/A
Green	Ben Wille	112	2.9	N/A
Majority		52	1.3	
Turnout		3,867	72.4	▲33.8
Conservative gain from Liberal Democrats		Swing		

=== Chigwell Village ===
Chigwell Village (compared with 2008 results)
Party	Candidate	Votes	%	±%
Conservative	Lesley Wagland	1,608	72.1	▼8.3
Liberal Democrats	Eleonor Spencer	442	19.8	▲8.9
Green	Christopher Lord	180	8.1	▲2.5
Majority		1,166	52.3	▼14.3
Turnout		2,230	68.4	▲28.8
Conservative hold		Swing		

=== Chipping Ongar, Greensted and Marden Ash ===
Chipping Ongar, Greensted and Marden Ash (compared with 2007 results) - 2 seats contested
Party	Candidate	Votes	%	±%
Liberal Democrats	Derek Jacobs	1,076	39.1	▼0.2
Conservative	Blane Judd	974	35.4	▼1.9
Conservative	Paul Keska	957		N/A
Liberal Democrats	Keith Wright	748		N/A
Green	Amy Barnecutt	251	9.1	N/A
Independent	Sheila Jackman	231	8.4	N/A
English Democrat	Robin Tilbrook	220	8.0	▼8.6
Turnout		4,381	68.4	▲20.6
Liberal Democrats hold		Swing		
Conservative hold		Swing		

=== Epping Hemnall ===
Epping Hemnall (compared with 2008 results)
Party	Candidate	Votes	%	±%
Liberal Democrats	Janet Whitehouse	1,632	46.5	▲0.5
Conservative	Kenneth Avey	1,348	38.4	▼3.8
Labour	Michael Finan	234	6.7	▲3.4
UKIP	Andrew Smith	232	6.6	N/A
Green	Jem Barnecutt	62	1.8	▼0.8
Majority		284	8.1	▲4.3
Turnout		3,508	71.4	▲29.8
Liberal Democrats hold		Swing		

=== Epping Lindsey and Thornwood Common ===
Epping Lindsey and Thornwood Common (compared with 2008 results)
Party	Candidate	Votes	%	±%
Conservative	Will Breare-Hall	1,692	49.3	▼1.7
Liberal Democrats	Lorraine Collier	1,264	36.9	▲7.0
Labour	Simon Bullough	341	9.9	▲3.1
Green	Barry Johns	133	3.9	▼1.0
Majority		428	12.5	▼8.6
Turnout		3,430	71.4	▼33.8
Conservative hold		Swing		

=== Grange Hill ===
Grange Hill (compared with 2008 results)
Party	Candidate	Votes	%	±%
Conservative	Gagan Mohindra	1,676	54.7	▼28.8
Liberal Democrats	Gavin Chambers	1,173	38.3	▲21.8
Green	Vikki Meier	216	7.0	N/A
Majority		504	16.4	50.6
Turnout		3,430	71.4	▲40.2
Conservative hold		Swing		

=== Loughton Alderton ===
Loughton Alderton (compared with 2008 results)
Party	Candidate	Votes	%	±%
Loughton Residents	Lance Leonard	1,016	48.1	▼0.8
Conservative	Edward Stacey	397	18.8	▲7.5
BNP	Edward Long	328	15.5	▼15.9
Labour	Tom Owen	237	11.2	▲5.7
Liberal Democrats	Neil Woollcott	135	6.4	▲3.5
Majority		619	29.3	▲11.8
Turnout		2,113	62.7	▲23.5
Loughton Residents gain from BNP		Swing		

=== Loughton Broadway ===
Loughton Broadway (compared with 2008 results)
Party	Candidate	Votes	%	±%
Loughton Residents	Jennie Hart	605	32.9	▼6.8
Labour	Margaret Owen	384	20.9	▼8.4
Conservative	Ben Glassman	354	19.3	▲8.0
BNP	Thomas Richardson	323	17.6	▼22.1
Liberal Democrats	Enid Robinson	172	9.4	▲5.4
Majority		221	12.0	▲1.6
Turnout		1,838	57.0	▲19.6
Loughton Residents gain from BNP		Swing		

=== Loughton Fairmead ===
Loughton Fairmead (compared with 2008 results)
Party	Candidate	Votes	%	±%
Loughton Residents	Tessa Cochrane	750	38.8	▼5.8
Conservative	Neil Cohen	472	24.4	▲10.0
BNP	Alexander Copeland	300	15.5	▼12.7
Labour	John Game	229	11.8	▲1.4
Liberal Democrats	Simon Hughes	182	9.4	▲7.0
Majority		278	14.4	▼2.1
Turnout		1,933	59.1	22.5
Loughton Residents gain from BNP		Swing		

=== Loughton Forest ===
Loughton Forest (compared with 2008 results)
Party	Candidate	Votes	%	±%
Loughton Residents	Colin Finn	1,093	43.8	▲4.2
Conservative	Lorne Daniel	1,069	42.9	▼3.8
Liberal Democrats	Angela Cass	257	10.3	▲6.4
Green	Simon Pepper	75	3.0	N/A
Majority		24	0.9	▼6.2
Turnout		2,494	73.0	▲26.9
Loughton Residents hold		Swing		

=== Loughton Roding ===
Loughton Roding (compared with 2008 results)
Party	Candidate	Votes	%	±%
Independent	Stephen Murray	1,720	70.5	N/A
Conservative	Iqbal Singh Kalkat	373	15.3	▼7.6
Liberal Democrats	Deborah Buckley	186	7.6	▲3.4
BNP	Ryan Hazell	160	6.6	▼6.4
Majority		1,347	55.2	▲27.3
Turnout		2,439	68.8	▲25.7
Independent hold		Swing		

=== Loughton St. John's ===
Epping St. John's (compared with 2008 results)
Party	Candidate	Votes	%	±%
Loughton Residents	John Markham	1,325	53.1	▲4.2
Conservative	Roger Taylor	787	31.5	▲2.7
Liberal Democrats	Peter Sinfield	165	6.6	▲3.9
Labour	Jill Bostock	163	6.5	▲1.5
Green	Linda Coombes	56	2.2	N/A
Majority		538	21.6	▼6.9
Turnout		2,496	72.1	▲29.9
Loughton Residents hold		Swing		

=== Loughton St. Mary's ===
Epping St. Mary's (compared with 2008 results)
Party	Candidate	Votes	%	±%
Loughton Residents	Richard Cohen	1,239	54.1	▲3.2
Conservative	Mitchell Cohen	777	33.9	▲1.0
Liberal Democrats	Peter Fuller	185	8.1	▲6.5
Green	Jesse Briton	88	3.8	N/A
Majority		462	21.6	▲3.6
Turnout		2,289	69.7	▲26.6
Loughton Residents gain from Conservative		Swing		

=== Lower Nazeing ===
Lower Nazeing (compared with 2007 results)
Party	Candidate	Votes	%	±%
Conservative	Yolanda Knight	1,476	66.6	▲13.9
Labour	Kelvin Morris	274	12.4	▲7.4
Independent	Toni Cooper	250	11.3	▼23.7
Liberal Democrats	Ingrid Black	176	7.9	N/A
Green	Alison Garnham	41	1.8	N/A
Majority		1,202	54.2	▲36.5
Turnout		2,217	69.0	▲31.4
Conservative hold		Swing		

=== North Weald Bassett ===
North Weald Bassett (compared with 2007 results)
Party	Candidate	Votes	%	±%
Conservative	Dave Stallan	1,682	71.5	▼10.6
Liberal Democrats	George Howard	511	21.7	▲3.8
Green	Nicola Harries	159	6.8	N/A
Majority		1,171	49.8	
Turnout		2,352	67.0	
Conservative hold		Swing		

=== Theydon Bois ===
Theydon Bois (compared with 2008 results)
Party	Candidate	Votes	%	±%
Conservative	Sue Jones	1,242	51.7	▲4.0
Liberal Democrats	Roland Frankel	1,066	44.4	▲6.7
Green	Daniel Kieve	95	4.0	▲0.8
Majority		176	7.3	▼2.7
Turnout		2,403	74.1	▲22.8
Conservative gain from Liberal Democrats		Swing		

=== Waltham Abbey Honey Lane ===
Waltham Abbey Honey Lane (compared with 2008 results)
Party	Candidate	Votes	%	±%
Conservative	David Johnson	1,662	61.5	▲5.7
Liberal Democrats	Lee Tant	824	30.5	▲7.6
Green	Jessica Barnecutt	218	8.1	N/A
Majority		838	31.0	▼1.9
Turnout		2,704	74.1	▲47.8
Conservative hold		Swing		

=== Waltham Abbey Paternoster ===
Waltham Abbey Paternoster (compared with 2007 results)
Party	Candidate	Votes	%	±%
Conservative	John Wyatt	1,030	58.3	▲14.0
Liberal Democrats	Philip Chadburn	554	31.3	N/A
Green	Pauline Gradden	184	10.4	N/A
Majority		476	26.9	▲16.1
Turnout		1,768	53.6	▲19.5
Conservative hold		Swing		
