= 2018 Epping Forest District Council election =

2018 UK local government election

- 3 May 2018

20 of 58 seats on Epping Forest District Council 30 seats needed for a majority
- Turnout: 29.7% (▲0.7%)
	First party	Second party	Third party
Leader	Chris Whitbread	Caroline Pond	Jon Whitehouse
Party	Conservative	Loughton Residents	Liberal Democrats
Leader's seat	Epping Lindsey & Thornwood Common	Loughton St. John's	Epping Hemnall
Last election	37 seats, 44.4%	13, 26.6%	2 seats, 10.2%
Seats before	38	13	2
Seats won	39	13	2
Seat change	▲2	Steady	Steady
Popular vote	11,017	5,004	3,897
Percentage	43.7%	19.8%	15.4%
Swing	▼0.7%	▼6.8%	▲5.2%
	Fourth party	Fifth party	Sixth party
Leader	Steven Neville	N/A	Rod Butler (Outgoing)
Party	Green	Independent	UKIP
Leader's seat	Buckhurst Hill East	N/A	Waltham Abbey Honey Lane
Last election	2 seats, 9.3%	2 seats, 2.9%	2 seats, 4.7%
Seats before	2	2	1
Seats won	2	2	0
Seat change	Steady	Steady	▼2
Popular vote	1,954	1,010	370
Percentage	7.7%	3.9%	1.4%
Swing	▼1.6%	▲1.0%	▼3.4%
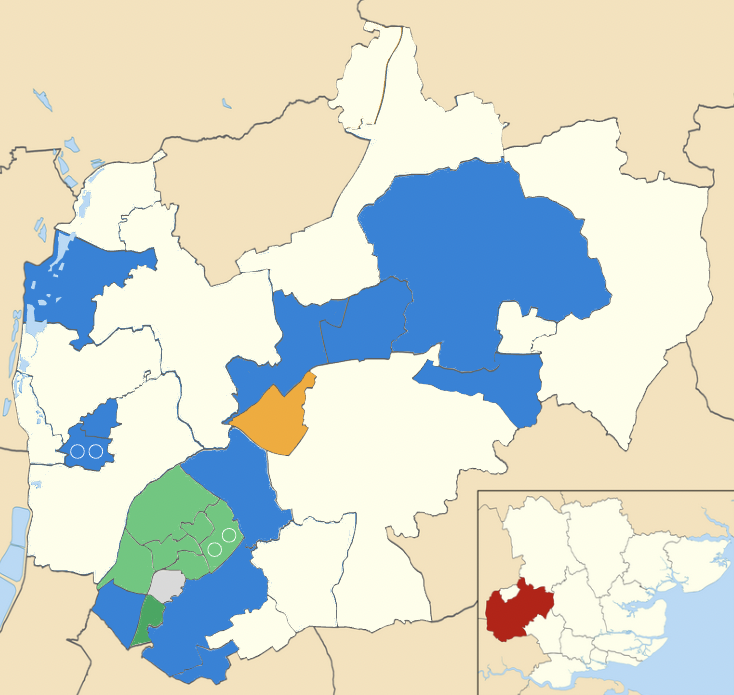
- Results of the 2018 District Council elections

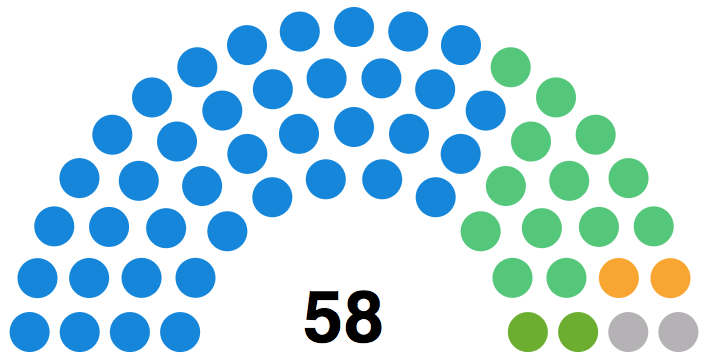
- Council composition following the election
Council control before election
Conservative
Council control after election
Conservative

The 2018 Epping Forest District Council election took place on 3 May 2018 to elect members of Epping Forest District Council in England. This was on the same day as other local elections.

This is the last election in which the UK Independence Party had elected representation on the council after the defection of David Dorrell to the Conservatives, and the defeat of Rod Butler.

== By-elections ==
=== Chigwell Village By-election ===
Chigwell Village By-election, 23 Feb 2017
Party	Candidate	Votes	%	±%
Conservative	Darshan Sunger	453	76.0	▲0.9
Liberal Democrats	Joanne Alexander-Sefre	143	23.9	N/A
Majority		310	52.0	▲10.5
Turnout		596	18%	
Conservative hold		Swing		

=== Lower Sheering by-election ===
A by-election was held on 19 October 2017 following the death of for Member of Parliament for Keighley, Gary Waller. Conservative, Paul Stalker won with 81% of the vote compared to 19% for the Liberal Democrats. Stalker completed Waller's term was re-elected in 2019 for a full term.

Lower Sheering By-election, 19 Oct 2017 (Compared to 2015 election)
Party	Candidate	Votes	%	±%
Conservative	Paul Stalker	220	80.8	▼0.7
Liberal Democrats	Ingrid Black	52	19.1	N/A
Majority		168	61.7	▲22.0
Turnout		272	16%	▼53%
Conservative hold		Swing		

== Ward results ==
Detailed below are all of the candidates nominated to stand in each ward in the upcoming election. Most figures are compared to the last time these seats were contested in any election cycle for the Epping Forest District Council election. Lower Nazeing, North Weald Bassett and Chipping Ongar, Greensted and Marden Ash are compared to the 2015 ward election held at the same time as the 2015 general election, hence the sharp decrease in turnout, both Waltham Abbey seats contested at this election have been compared to the 2014 local election result because UKIP won both at that point:

=== Buckhurst Hill East ===
Buckhurst Hill East
Party	Candidate	Votes	%	±%
Green	Steven Neville	1,084	68.8	▲23.6
Conservative	Neville Wright	440	27.9	▼13.0
Liberal Democrats	Dev Dodeja	50	3.1	N/A
Majority		644	40.9	▲36.6
Turnout		1,574	43%	▲2.0
Green hold		Swing		

=== Buckhurst Hill West ===
Buckhurst Hill West
Party	Candidate	Votes	%	±%
Conservative	Jo Share-Bernia	921	48.0	▼10.7
Liberal Democrats	Joseph Barkham	750	39.1	▲20.2
Green	Roger Neville	246	12.8	▼7.0
Majority		171	8.9	▼30.0
Turnout		1,917	35%	▲2.0
Conservative hold		Swing		

=== Chigwell Village ===
Chigwell Village
Party	Candidate	Votes	%	±%
Conservative	Darshan Sunger	751	77.0	▲1.9
Labour	Wendy Maher	114	11.7	▼0.7
Green	Christopher Lord	65	6.6	▼5.9
Liberal Democrats	Joanne Alexander-Sefre	45	4.6	N/A
Majority		637	65.3	▲2.8
Turnout		975	29%	▼4.0
Conservative hold		Swing		

=== Chipping Ongar, Greensted and Marden Ash (Note: Last election in this ward was contested at the same time as a general election where turnout was significantly higher) ===
Chipping Ongar, Greensted and Marden Ash
Party	Candidate	Votes	%	±%
Conservative	Basil Vaz	704	69.5	▲17.9
Liberal Democrats	Pesh Kapasiawala	308	30.4	▲13.0
Majority		396	39.1	▲10.0
Turnout		1,012	30%	▼42.0
Conservative hold		Swing		

=== Epping Hemnall ===
Epping Hemnall
Party	Candidate	Votes	%	±%
Liberal Democrats	Janet Hilda Whitehouse	1,156	61.2	▲4.4
Conservative	Simon Baker	554	29.3	▼5.0
Labour	Inez Collier	176	9.3	▲0.4
Majority		602	31.9	▲9.4
Turnout		1,886	38%	▲1.0
Liberal Democrats hold		Swing		

=== Epping Lindsey & Thornwood Common ===
Epping Lindsey and Thornwood Common
Party	Candidate	Votes	%	±%
Conservative	Les Burrows	844	43.7	▼11.2
Liberal Democrats	Cherry McCredie	811	42.0	▲19.0
Labour	Simon Bullough	183	9.4	▼5.5
Green	Paul Scales	92	4.7	▼2.5
Majority		33	1.7	▼30.2
Turnout		1,930	36%	▲4.0
Conservative hold		Swing		

=== Grange Hill ===
Grange Hill
Party	Candidate	Votes	%	±%
Conservative	Gagan Mohindra	803	57.9	▼7.2
Labour	Kay Morrison	447	32.2	N/A
Green	Rupert Nelson	136	9.8	▼25.1
Majority		356	25.7	▼4.5
Turnout		1,386	26%	Steady
Conservative hold		Swing		

=== Loughton Alderton ===
Loughton Alderton
Party	Candidate	Votes	%	±%
Loughton Residents	Chris Roberts	597	64.4	▲0.6
Labour	Angela Ayre	172	18.5	▲1.7
Conservative	Robert Church	158	17.0	▼2.4
Majority		425	45.9	▲1.0
Turnout		927	27%	▲2.0
Loughton Residents hold		Swing		

=== Loughton Broadway ===
Loughton Broadway
Party	Candidate	Votes	%	±%
Loughton Residents	Chris Pond	678	39.4	N/A
Loughton Residents	Michael Owen	655	38.12	N/A
Labour	Rosie Kelly	176	10.2	N/A
Conservative	Katherine Harris	126	7.3	N/A
Conservative	Marshall Vance	83	4.8	N/A
Majority		N/A	N/A	N/A
Turnout		1,718	27%	▲2.0
Loughton Residents hold		Swing		
Loughton Residents hold		Swing		

=== Loughton Fairmead ===
Loughton Fairmead
Party	Candidate	Votes	%	±%
Loughton Residents	Louise Mead	686	72.0	▼12.9
Labour	Paul Thomas	135	14.1	N/A
Conservative	George Bose	131	13.7	▼1.5
Majority		551	57.9	▼11.8
Turnout		952	29%	▲4.0
Loughton Residents hold		Swing		

=== Loughton Forest ===
Loughton Forest
Party	Candidate	Votes	%	±%
Loughton Residents	Roger Baldwin	678	54.4	N/A
Conservative	Jonathan Hunter	486	39.0	N/A
Labour	Martin Lawford	85	6.8	N/A
Majority		192	15.4	N/A
Turnout		1,249	37%	▼1.0
Loughton Residents hold		Swing		

=== Loughton Roding ===
Loughton Roding
Party	Candidate	Votes	%	±%
Independent	Stephen Murray	1,010	82.3	▲0.8
Conservative	Peter Murray	129	10.5	▼0.5
Labour	Kenneth Turner	88	7.1	▲3.2
Majority		881	71.8	▲1.3
Turnout		1,227	33%	▼9.0
Independent hold		Swing		

=== Loughton St. John's ===
Loughton St. John's
Party	Candidate	Votes	%	±%
Loughton Residents	Bob Jennings	884	71.6	▼10.2
Conservative	Neal Bagshaw	247	20.0	▲1.8
Labour	Jill Bostock	103	8.3	N/A
Majority		637	51.6	▼11.4
Turnout		1,234	35%	Steady
Loughton Residents hold		Swing		

=== Loughton St. Mary's ===
Loughton St. Mary's
Party	Candidate	Votes	%	±%
Loughton Residents	Howard Kauffman	826	65.6	▼3.4
Conservative	Joyce Obaseki	270	21.4	▼3.7
Labour	Benjamin Ross	109	8.6	N/A
Liberal Democrats	Jon Gilbert	53	4.2	▼1.7
Majority		556	44.2	▲0.3
Turnout		1,258	33%	▼2.0
Loughton Residents hold		Swing		

=== Lower Nazeing ===
Lower Nazeing
Party	Candidate	Votes	%	±%
Conservative	Yolanda Knight	541	68.5	▼13.0
Labour	Brett Hawksbee	89	11.2	▼7.2
UKIP	Martin Harvey	85	10.7	N/A
Liberal Democrats	Elaine Thatcher	74	9.3	N/A
Majority		452	57.3	▼5.6
Turnout		789	24%	▼43.0
Conservative hold		Swing		

=== Moreton and Fyfield ===
Moreton and Fyfield
Party	Candidate	Votes	%	±%
Conservative	Ian Hadley	Unopposed		
Majority		N/A	100%	▲24.6
Turnout		N/A	N/A	N/A
Conservative hold		Swing		

=== North Weald Bassett ===
North Weald Bassett
Party	Candidate	Votes	%	±%
Conservative	Peter Bolton	852	79.5	▲19.7
Liberal Democrats	Ingrid Black	219	20.4	▲13.0
Majority		633	59.1	▲24.8
Turnout		1,071	29%	▼37.0
Conservative hold		Swing		

=== Theydon Bois ===
Theydon Bois
Party	Candidate	Votes	%	±%
Conservative	Sue Jones	810	64.2	▼12.4
Liberal Democrats	Clive Amos	321	25.4	▼2.0
Labour	Peter Richardson	130	10.3	N/A
Majority		489	38.8	▼14.4
Turnout		1,261	38%	▲5.0
Conservative hold		Swing		

=== Waltham Abbey Honey Lane (Note: Results compared to the 2014 District Council election where UKIP won the ward) ===
Waltham Abbey Honey Lane
Party	Candidate	Votes	%	±%
Conservative	David Stocker	617	29.0	N/A
Conservative	Steven Heather	564	26.5	N/A
Labour	Mitch Diamond-Conway	350	16.4	▼1.9
Green	Carina Hill	254	11.9	N/A
UKIP	Rodney Butler	229	10.7	▼34.0
Liberal Democrats	Timothy Vaughan	5.1		N/A
Majority		N/A	N/A	N/A
Turnout		2,124	26%	▼3.0%
Conservative gain from UKIP		Swing		
Conservative hold		Swing		

=== Waltham Abbey Paternoster ===
Independent David Dorrell (elected as a UKIP councillor in 2014) joined the Conservatives in February 2018.

Waltham Abbey Paternoster
Party	Candidate	Votes	%	±%
Conservative	David Dorrell	342	50.5	▲16.3
Labour	Robert Greyson	201	29.7	▲12.2
Green	Dave Plummer	77	11.3	N/A
UKIP	Ron McEvoy	56	8.2	▼36.4
Majority		141	20.8	▼8.6
Turnout		676	20%	▼8.0
Conservative gain from UKIP		Swing		
