= 2008 Epping Forest District Council election =

UK local election

- 1 May 2008

21 of 58 seats on Epping Forest District Council 30 seats needed for a majority
- Turnout: 38.4 (▲4.1%)

	First party	Second party	Third party
Leader	Diana Collins	Jon Whitehouse	Peter House
Party	Conservative	Liberal Democrats	Loughton Residents
Leader's seat	Passingford	Epping Hemnall	Loughton Forest
Last election	32 seats, 57.0%	11 seats, 24.9%	5 seats, 9.7%
Seats before	32	11	5
Seats won	35	9	6
Seat change	▲3	▼2	▲1
Popular vote	12,454	5,763	4,029
Percentage	47.0%	21.7%	15.2%
Swing	▼10.0%	▼3.2%	▲5.5%
	Fourth party	Fifth party	Sixth party
Leader	Patricia Richardson	N/A	Peter Gode
Party	BNP	Independent	Labour
Leader's seat	Loughton Fairmead	N/A	Shelley
Last election	6 seats, 6.0%	3 seats, 3.8%	1 seat, 4.9%
Seats before	6	3	1
Seats won	4	3 (Note: Richard Morgan (Hastingwood, Matching and Sheering Village), and Stephen Murray (Loughton Roding))	1
Seat change	▼2	Steady	Steady
Popular vote	2,391	510	1,120
Percentage	9.0%	2.3%	4.2%
Swing	▲3.0%	▼5.7%	▼0.7%
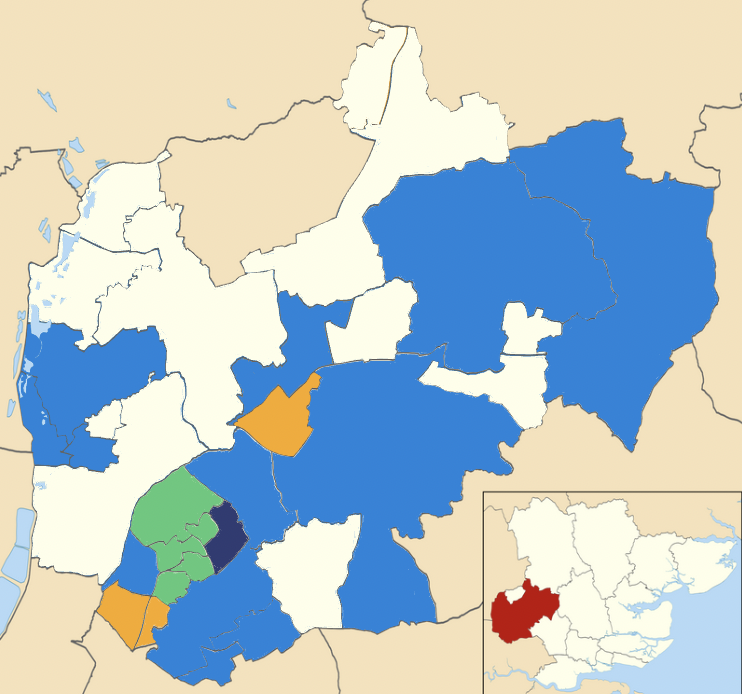
- Results of the 2008 District Council elections

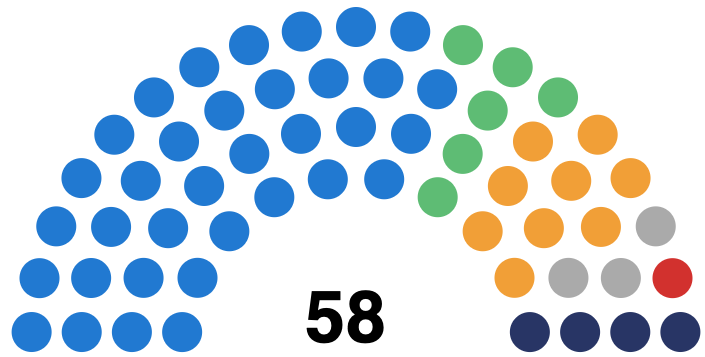
- Council composition following the election
Council control before election
Conservative
Council control after election
Conservative

Elections to Epping Forest Council were held on 1 May 2008. One third of the council was up for election and the council remained in Conservative control.

This election saw the largest Green competition. The Chigwell Residents Association's sole councillor, John Knapman, defected to join the Conservatives and won his seat of Chigwell Village. The Loughton Residents Association gained a seat, whilst the BNP lost almost half its representation, despite reaching a record high vote share in the district.

One-third of council up for election. No elections this year in Broadley Common, Epping Upland and Nazeing, Chipping Ongar, Greensted and Marden Ash, Hastingwood, Matching and Sheering Village, Lambourne, Lower Nazeing, Lower Sheering, North Weald Bassett, Roydon, Shelley, Waltham Abbey High Beach or Waltham Abbey Paternoster.

== By-elections ==
=== Loughton Alderton by-election ===
Loughton Alderton By-Election 30 August 2007
Party	Candidate	Votes	%	±%
BNP	Tony Frankland	393	32.2	▼5.4
Loughton Residents	Rose Brookes	367	30.1	▲1.0
Liberal Democrats	Neil Woollcott	172	14.1	▲10.5
Conservative	Edward Stacey	163	13.3	▼3.1
Labour	Stephen Barnes	98	8.0	▼5.2
UKIP	Andrew Smith	28	2.3	N/A
Majority		26	2.1	▼6.4
Turnout		1,221	36.7	▼6.6
BNP hold		Swing		

=== Waltham Abbey Honey Lane by-election ===
Waltham Abbey Honey Lane By-Election 4 June 2009
Party	Candidate	Votes	%	±%
Conservative	Adam Clark	719	49.0	▼7.3
BNP	Tony Frankland	372	25.4	N/A
Liberal Democrats	Phil Chadburn	223	15.2	N/A
Labour	Mitch Diamond-Conway	152	10.4	▲7.3
Majority		347	23.6	▲12.7
Turnout		1,466	32.0	▲1.8
Conservative hold		Swing		

=== Grange Hill by-election ===
Grange Hill By-Election 8 October 2009
Party	Candidate	Votes	%	±%
Conservative	Alan Lion	453	52.4	▼31.1
Liberal Democrats	Gavin Chambers	411	47.6	▲31.1
Majority		42	4.8	▼4.0
Turnout		864	17.2	▼20.8
Conservative hold		Swing		

=== Lower Sheering by-election ===
Lower Sheering By-Election 5 November 2009
Party	Candidate	Votes	%	±%
Conservative	Charlotte Edwards	302	76.5	▲0.7
Liberal Democrats	Ingrid Black	93	23.5	▼0.7
Majority		209	53.0	▲1.6
Turnout		395	21.4	▼11.2
Conservative hold		Swing		

== Ward results ==
=== Buckhurst Hill East ===
Buckhurst Hill East
Party	Candidate	Votes	%	±%
Liberal Democrats	Dev Dodeja	648	49.4	▼3.2
Conservative	Marshall Vance	527	40.2	▲6.3
BNP	Graham Cater	137	10.4	▼3.1
Majority		121	9.2	▼9.5
Turnout		1,312	38.6	▼2.7
Liberal Democrats hold		Swing		

=== Buckhurst Hill West ===
Buckhurst Hill West
Party	Candidate	Votes	%	±%
Liberal Democrats	Jill Sutcliffe	1,054	51.3	▲9.7
Conservative	Bob Church	1,000	48.7	▼10.0
Majority		54	2.6	▼14.2
Turnout		2,054	38.6	▲5.6
Liberal Democrats hold		Swing		

=== Chigwell Row ===
Chigwell Row
Party	Candidate	Votes	%	±%
Conservative	Brian Sandler	573	80.5	▲21.1
Liberal Democrats	Connie Lye	99	13.9	▼26.7
Green	Robert Steel	40	5.6	N/A
Majority		472	66.6	▲19.1
Turnout		712	39.6	▲8.0
Conservative hold		Swing		

=== Chigwell Village ===
Chigwell Village
Party	Candidate	Votes	%	±%
Conservative	John Knapman	888	82.1	N/A
Green	Chris Lord	108	10.0	N/A
Liberal Democrats	Arnold Verrall	86	7.9	▼32.7
Majority		780	72.1	▲34.2
Turnout		1,082	34.0	▼3.9
Conservative gain from Chigwell Residents Association				

=== Epping Hemnall ===
Epping Hemnall (2)
Party	Candidate	Votes	%	±%
Liberal Democrats	Jonathan Whitehouse	915	46.0	▲6.8
Conservative	Matthew Daniel	840	42.2	▲3.5
BNP	James Butler	118	5.9	▼1.2
Labour	Paul Handford	67	3.4	▼1.2
Green	Jessica Barnecutt	51	2.6	N/A
Majority		75	3.8	▲3.3
Turnout		1,991	41.6	▼1.4
Liberal Democrats hold		Swing		

=== Epping Lindsey and Thornwood Common ===
Epping Lindsey and Thornwood Common
Party	Candidate	Votes	%	±%
Conservative	Christopher Whitbread	905	51.0	▲2.1
Liberal Democrats	Lorraine Collier	531	29.9	▲3.8
BNP	Tony Bentley	132	7.4	▼2.1
Labour	Simon Bullough	120	6.8	N/A
Green	Robert Jones	87	4.9	N/A
Majority		374	21.1	▼1.7
Turnout		1,775	37.6	▼2.7
Conservative hold		Swing		

=== Grange Hill ===
Grange Hill
Party	Candidate	Votes	%	±%
Conservative	David Bateman	1,262	83.5	▲21.3
Liberal Democrats	Pamela Okonkwo	249	16.5	▼13.1
Majority		1,013	67.0	▲34.4
Turnout		1,511	31.2	▲3.5
Conservative hold		Swing		

=== High Ongar, Willingale and The Rodings ===
High Ongar, Willingale and The Rodings
Party	Candidate	Votes	%	±%
Conservative	Margaret McEwen	469	76.5	▲5.9
English Democrat	Robin Tilbrook	61	10.0	N/A
Liberal Democrats	Brian Surtees	53	8.6	▼19.8
Green	Amy Barnecutt	30	4.9	N/A
Majority		408	66.5	▲23.3
Turnout		613	36.5	▼4.2
Conservative hold		Swing		

=== Loughton Alderton ===
Loughton Alderton
Party	Candidate	Votes	%	±%
Loughton Residents	Rosemary Brookes	642	48.9	▲26.0
BNP	Tony Frankland	412	31.4	▲3.4
Conservative	Roger Taylor	148	11.3	▼11.0
Labour	Margaret Owen	72	5.5	▼14.3
Liberal Democrats	Neil Woollcott	38	2.9	▼4.2
Majority		230	17.5	▲12.4
Turnout		1,312	39.2	▲4.6
Loughton Residents gain from BNP		Swing		

=== Loughton Broadway ===
Loughton Broadway
Party	Candidate	Votes	%	±%
BNP	Patricia Richardson	469	39.7	▲6.1
Labour	Roger Salmon	346	29.3	▲2.1
Conservative	Valerie Metcalfe	250	21.2	▼2.2
Green	Jesse Briton	69	5.8	N/A
Liberal Democrats	Eleonor Spencer	47	4.0	▼10.9
Majority		123	10.4	▲4.0
Turnout		1,181	37.4	▲1.6
BNP hold		Swing		

=== Loughton Fairmead ===
Loughton Fairmead
Party	Candidate	Votes	%	±%
Loughton Residents	David Wixley	523	44.6	▲18.0
BNP	Alexander Copland	330	28.2	▲1.6
Conservative	Ben Glassman	169	14.4	▼3.2
Labour	Matthew Hartley	122	10.4	▼11.2
Liberal Democrats	Peter Sinfield	28	2.4	▼6.5
Majority		193	16.5	▲15.2
Turnout		1,172	36.6	▲5.2
Loughton Residents gain from BNP		Swing		

=== Loughton Forest ===
Loughton Forest
Party	Candidate	Votes	%	±%
Conservative	James Hart	698	46.7	▼1.3
Conservative	Rebecca Cohen	685		
Loughton Residents	Chris Pond	592	39.6	▲2.5
Loughton Residents	David White	537		
Labour	Thomas Owen	79	5.3	▼4.8
Labour	John Game	66		
BNP	Paul Evans	66	4.4	N/A
Liberal Democrats	Peter Sinfield	59	3.9	▼1.0
Majority		106	7.1	▼3.8
Turnout		2,783	46.1	▲1.8
Conservative hold		Swing		
Conservative gain from Loughton Residents		Swing		

=== Loughton Roding ===
Loughton Roding
Party	Candidate	Votes	%	±%
Loughton Residents	Kenneth Angold-Stephens	763	50.8	▼1.2
Conservative	Lorne Daniel	344	22.9	▲4.5
BNP	Tom Richardson	180	12.0	N/A
Labour	Angela Ayre	153	10.2	▼4.5
Liberal Democrats	Peter Fuller	63	4.2	▼9.7
Majority		419	27.9	▼16.7
Turnout		1,503	43.1	▼1.5
Loughton Residents hold		Swing		

=== Loughton St. John's ===
Loughton St. John's
Party	Candidate	Votes	%	±%
Loughton Residents	Caroline Pond	815	57.3	▲4.3
Conservative	Nigel Wagland	410	28.8	▲5.5
BNP	Lynne Turpin	89	6.3	N/A
Labour	Jill Bostock	71	5.0	▼2.7
Liberal Democrats	David Roderick	38	2.7	▼2.6
Majority		40.5	28.5	▲9.8
Turnout		1,423	42.2	▲2.0
Loughton Residents hold		Swing		

=== Loughton St. Mary's ===
Loughton St. Mary's
Party	Candidate	Votes	%	±%
Loughton Residents	Rodney Barrett	694	50.9	▼4.4
Conservative	Edward Stacey	449	32.9	▲4.0
BNP	Edward Butler	91	6.7	N/A
Labour	Martin Lawford	90	6.6	▼1.8
Liberal Democrats	Mick Spence	22	1.6	▼5.8
UKIP	Mick McGough	18	1.3	N/A
Majority		245	18.0	N/A
Turnout		1,364	43.1	▲3.6
Loughton Residents hold		Swing		

=== Moreton and Fyfield ===
Moreton and Fyfield
Party	Candidate	Votes	%	±%
Conservative	Tony Boyce	329	45.3	▲9.0
Liberal Democrats	Douglas Kelly	315	43.4	▼6.2
English Democrat	Anne Palmer	82	11.3	▼2.8
Majority		14	1.9	▼11.4
Turnout		726	42.1	▼6.7
Conservative gain from Liberal Democrats		Swing		

=== Passingford ===
Passingford
Party	Candidate	Votes	%	±%
Conservative	Diana Collins	537	89.1	▲6.3
Liberal Democrats	Ingrid Black	66	10.9	▼6.3
Majority		471	78.1	▲12.5
Turnout		603	43.1	Steady
Conservative hold		Swing		

=== Theydon Bois ===
Theydon Bois
Party	Candidate	Votes	%	±%
Conservative	John Philip	771	47.7	▲1.0
Liberal Democrats	George Howard	610	37.7	▼15.6
BNP	Terry Howard	109	6.7	N/A
UKIP	Andrew Smith	76	4.7	N/A
Green	Nicola Barnecutt	52	3.2	N/A
Majority		161	10.0	▲3.4
Turnout		1,618	51.3	▲2.9
Conservative gain from Liberal Democrats		Swing		

=== Waltham Abbey Honey Lane ===
Waltham Abbey Honey Lane (2)
Party	Candidate	Votes	%	±%
Conservative	Jonathon Collier	676	55.8	▼2.0
Liberal Democrats	Christine Akers	277	22.9	▲1.1
BNP	Garry Martin	258	21.3	▲0.9
Majority		399	32.9	▼3.1
Turnout		1,211	26.3	▲2.0
Conservative hold		Swing		

=== Waltham Abbey North East ===
Waltham Abbey North East
Party	Candidate	Votes	%	±%
Conservative	Jeane Lea	735	65.8	▲15.0
Liberal Democrats	Phil Chadburn	410	35.8	▼15.0
Majority		325	28.4	▲26.8
Turnout		1,145	35.0	▲3.0
Conservative hold		Swing		

=== Waltham Abbey South West ===
Waltham Abbey South West
Party	Candidate	Votes	%	±%
Conservative	Bill Prior	474	65.8	▲2.3
Liberal Democrats	Peggy Ayre	155	21.5	▼15.0
UKIP	Martin Harvey	91	12.6	N/A
Majority		319	44.3	▲17.3
Turnout		720	23.6	▼1.0
Conservative hold		Swing		

{Notes}
