= Stephen Pewsey =

Stephen Pewsey (born 1955 in Rochford, Essex) is a local historian and prolific author. He grew up in Southend-on-Sea, later living in Newham (Greater London), Loughton in Essex, and East Anglia.

Pewsey attended Southend High School for Boys and was a founder member of Southend Action Group for the Arts. He was later a founder member of the Beckton Residents Association, serving as its first Secretary, and was Secretary of the Loughton Residents Association 2007–18. He began his writing career in the 1970s contributing to local magazines.

He has served in various capacities on numerous heritage bodies, including the British Association for Local History (Publications Committee), Essex Archaeological & Historical Congress (Secretary 1996–99, Chairman 2008–11, President 2011–16), Essex Society for Archaeology & History, Loughton & District Historical Society, Newham History Society, and Wanstead Historical Society. He was Deputy Mayor of Loughton 2011–12 and Mayor in 2012–13, having also served on Loughton Town Council as Chairman of its Resources & General Services Committee and its Environment & Heritage Committee. He founded the Loughton Film Society in 2010, and was its first chairman, and the Loughton Art Trail in 2014. He was also a committee member of the Loughton Festival, and was vice-chairman of the Lopping Endowment, a charitable trust which manages Lopping Hall, a community arts venue, in Loughton. He has acted as historical consultant for a wide range of heritage projects in Essex, East London and East Anglia.
