= 2002 Epping Forest District Council election =

2002 UK local government election

- 2 May 2002

All 58 seats to Epping Forest District Council 30 seats needed for a majority
- Turnout: 30.4% (▲0.4%)

	First party	Second party	Third party
Leader	Maggie McEwen	Michael Heavens	Stan Goodwin
Party	Conservative	Liberal Democrats	Labour
Leader's seat	High Ongar, Willingale & the Rodings	Buckhurst Hill West	Loughton Roding
Last election	20 seats, 43.1%	16 seats, 24.2%	12 seats, 19.1%
Seats before	20	16	12
Seats won	26	13	9
Seat change	▲6	▼3	▼3
Popular vote	28,186	16,206	7,260
Percentage	48.2%	27.7%	12.4%
Swing	▲5.1%	▲3.5%	▼6.7%
	Fourth party	Fifth party
Leader	Dorothy Paddon	N/A
Party	Loughton Residents	Independent inc. CRA
Leader's seat	Loughton St. Mary's	N/A
Last election	7 seats, 6.3%	4 seats, 7.7%
Seats before	7	4
Seats won	6	4 (Note: Daphne Borton (Nazeing), Norman Clark (Roydon), John Knapman (CRA - Chigwell Village), and Richard Morgan (Hastingwood, Matching and Sheering Village))
Seat change	▼1	Steady
Popular vote	3,476	3,766
Percentage	5.9%	6.4%
Swing	▼3.0%	▲1.7%
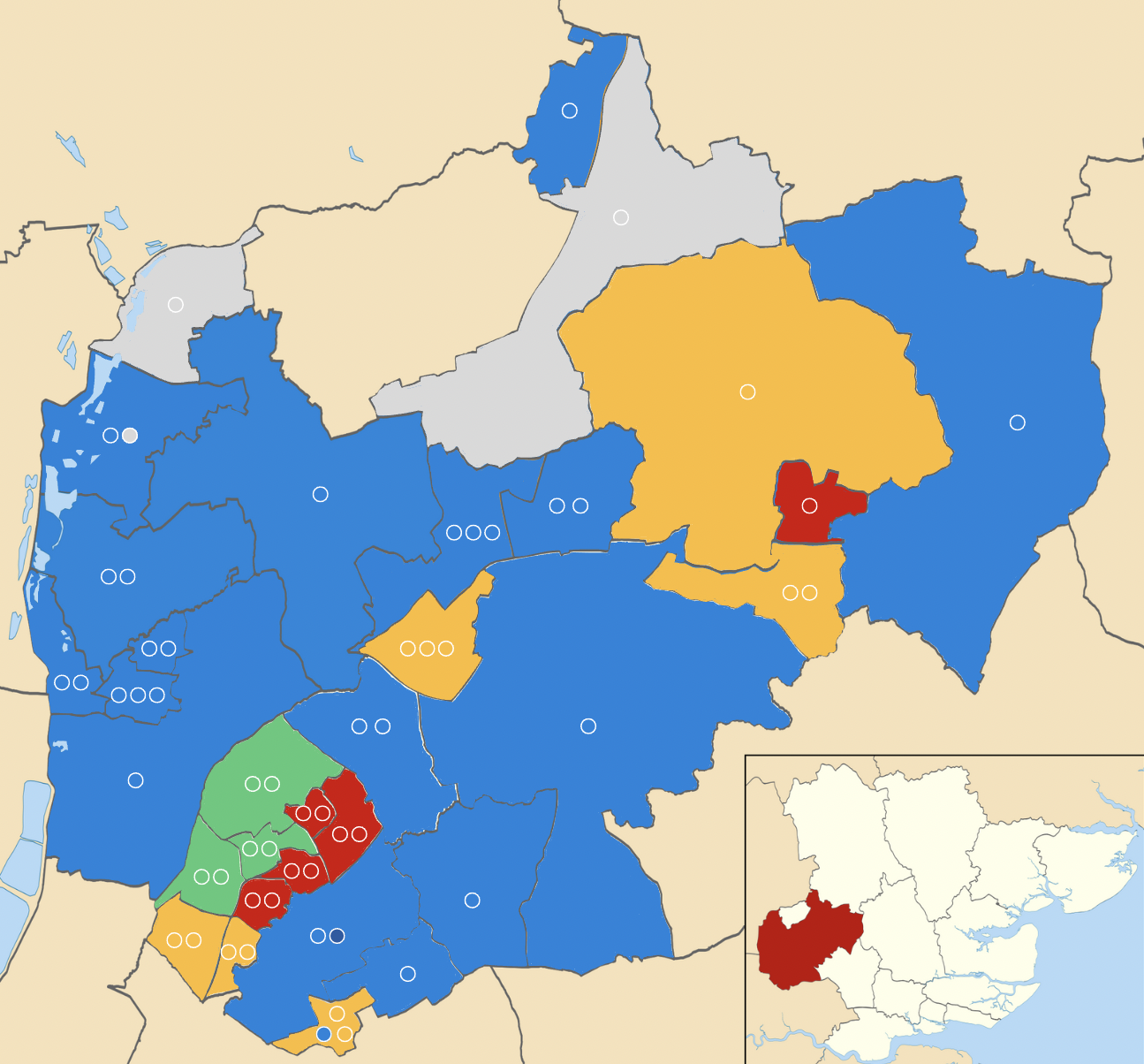
- Results of the 2002 District Council elections

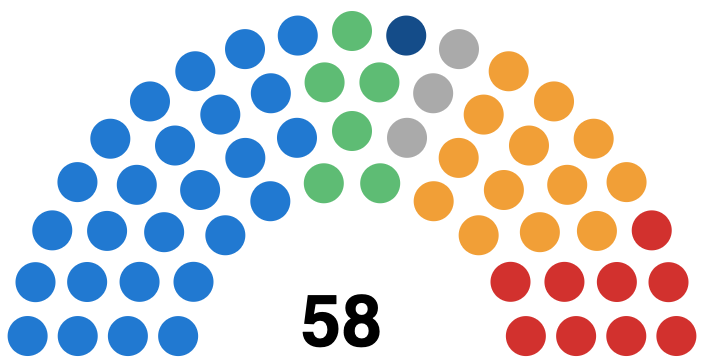
- Council composition following the election
Council control before election
No overall control
Conservative largest party
Council control after election
No overall control
Conservative largest party

Elections to Epping Forest Council were held on 2 May 2002. The whole council was up for election with boundary changes since the last election in 2000 reducing the number of seats by one. The council stayed under no overall control.

Abolished wards include Broadway, Debden Green, Greensted and Marden Ash, High Ongar, Roothing Country, and High Beech.

== By-elections ==
=== Buckhurst Hill East by-election ===
Buckhurst Hill East by-election 6 July 2000
Party	Candidate	Votes	%	±%
Liberal Democrats		711	69.2	+9.2
Conservative		245	23.9	−5.2
Labour		71	6.9	−3.4
Majority		466	46.0	
Turnout		1,027	31.4	
Liberal Democrats hold		Swing		

== Results ==
=== Broadley Common, Epping Upland & Nazeing ===
Broadley Common, Epping Upland & Nazeing
Party	Candidate	Votes	%	±%
Conservative	Penny Smith	448	85.8	
Liberal Democrats	Gilbert Graty	74	14.2	
Majority		374	71.6	
Turnout		522	32.2	
Conservative win (new seat)				

=== Buckhurst Hill East ===
Buckhurst Hill East (2)
Party	Candidate	Votes	%	±%
Liberal Democrats	Leonard Martin	661	54.1	
Liberal Democrats	Malcolm Woollard	659		
Conservative	George Denny	408	33.4	
Conservative	Mercedes Window	401		
Labour	Ronald Rodwell	152	12.5	
Majority			20.7	
Turnout		2,281	36.1	
Liberal Democrats win (new seat)				
Liberal Democrats win (new seat)				

=== Buckhurst Hill West ===
Buckhurst Hill West (3)
Party	Candidate	Votes	%	±%
Liberal Democrats	Ann Haigh	1,002	54.4	
Liberal Democrats	Michael Heavens	931		
Liberal Democrats	Robert Goold	912		
Conservative	Richard Watts	840	45.6	
Conservative	Neil Cohen	824		
Conservative	Haluk Ulkun	741		
Majority			8.8	
Turnout		5,250	26.2	
Liberal Democrats win (new seat)				
Liberal Democrats win (new seat)				
Liberal Democrats win (new seat)				

=== Chigwell Row ===
Chigwell Row
Party	Candidate	Votes	%	±%
Conservative	Brian Sandler	324	50.5	
Liberal Democrats	Patricia Brooks	317	49.5	
Majority		7	1.0	
Turnout		641	37.6	
Conservative win (new seat)				

=== Chigwell Village ===
Chigwell Village (2)
Party	Candidate	Votes	%	±%
Conservative	John Gilliham	686	46.8	
Chigwell Residents Association	John Knapman	612	41.7	
Liberal Democrats	Peter Netherclift	169	11.5	
Liberal Democrats	Jeffrey Stollar	163		
Majority			5.0	
Turnout		1,630	31.5	
Conservative win (new seat)				
Chigwell Residents Association win (new seat)				

=== Chipping Ongar, Greensted and Marden Ash ===
Chipping Ongar, Greensted and Marden Ash (2)
Party	Candidate	Votes	%	±%
Liberal Democrats	Derek Jacobs	674	52.5	
Liberal Democrats	Keith Wright	570		
Conservative	Glyn Pritchard	443	34.5	
Conservative	Frank Love	443		
Labour	Keith Tait	168	13.1	
Labour	Jill Coward	140		
Majority			18.0	
Turnout		2,433	39.0	
Liberal Democrats win (new seat)				
Liberal Democrats win (new seat)				

=== Epping Hemnall ===
Epping Hemnall (3)
Party	Candidate	Votes	%	±%
Liberal Democrats	Janet Whitehouse	883	56.6	
Liberal Democrats	Jonathan Whitehouse	826		
Liberal Democrats	Allan Boydon	823		
Conservative	Susan Perry	528	33.8	
Conservative	Richard Brady	521		
Conservative	James Manly	515		
Labour	Anne Baldwin	150	9.6	
Majority			9.6	
Turnout		4,246	31.6	
Liberal Democrats win (new seat)				
Liberal Democrats win (new seat)				
Liberal Democrats win (new seat)				

=== Epping Lindsey and Thornwood Common ===
Epping Lindsey and Thornwood Common (3)
Party	Candidate	Votes	%	±%
Conservative	Matthew Colling	868	39.2	
Conservative	Christopher Whitbread	858		
Conservative	Andrew Green	835		
Liberal Democrats	Olive Dunseath	773	34.9	
Liberal Democrats	Janet Hedges	773		
Liberal Democrats	John Rumble	739		
Labour	Pamela Johns	304	13.7	
Independent	Christopher Hudson	269	12.1	
Labour	Robert Jones	255		
Majority			4.3	
Turnout		5,674	49.2	
Conservative win (new seat)				
Conservative win (new seat)				
Conservative win (new seat)				

=== Grange Hill ===
Grange Hill (3)
Party	Candidate	Votes	%	±%
Liberal Democrats	William Maclaine	827	50.1	
Conservative	David Bateman	825	49.9	
Liberal Democrats	Gavin Stollar	791		
Liberal Democrats	Peter Spencer	789		
Conservative	Ronald McCarthy	780		
Conservative	Cheryl-Anne Kashket	766		
Majority			0.1	
Turnout		4,778	34.0	
Liberal Democrats win (new seat)				
Conservative win (new seat)				
Liberal Democrats win (new seat)				

=== Hastingwood, Matching and Sheering Village ===
Hastingwood, Matching and Sheering Village
Party	Candidate	Votes	%	±%
Independent	Richard Morgan	351	59.4	
Conservative	Terence Dewhurst	240	40.6	
Majority		111	18.8	
Turnout		591	35.5	
Independent win (new seat)				

=== High Ongar, Willingale and the Rodings ===
High Ongar, Willingale and the Rodings
Party	Candidate	Votes	%	±%
Conservative	Margaret McEwen	408	74.0	
Labour	Peter Gode	143	26.0	
Majority		265	48.0	
Turnout		551	34.2	
Conservative win (new seat)				

=== Lambourne ===
Lambourne
Party	Candidate	Votes	%	±%
Conservative	Stephen Metcalfe	403	55.7	
Labour	Colin Huckle	320	44.3	
Majority		83	11.4	
Turnout		723	47.1	
Conservative win (new seat)				

=== Loughton Alderton ===
Loughton Alderton (2)
Party	Candidate	Votes	%	±%
Labour	Maureen Boatman	412	49.0	
Labour	Paul Bostock	377		
Conservative	Derek Knight	315	37.5	
Conservative	Ian Locks	292		
Liberal Democrats	Enid Robinson	114	13.6	
Majority			11.5	
Turnout		1,510	23.8	
Labour win (new seat)				
Labour win (new seat)				

=== Loughton Broadway ===
Loughton Broadway (2)
Party	Candidate	Votes	%	±%
Labour	Joan Davis	463	47.3	
Labour	Margaret Owen	398		
Conservative	Sheila Creswell	236	24.1	
Conservative	John Silberrad	216		
Independent	Peter Relph	151	15.4	
Liberal Democrats	Peter Sinfield	129	13.2	
Majority			23.2	
Turnout		1,593	26.5	
Labour win (new seat)				
Labour win (new seat)				

=== Loughton Fairmead ===
Loughton Fairmead (2)
Party	Candidate	Votes	%	±%
Labour	Stephen Barnes	371	56.0	
Labour	Albert Farren	322		
Conservative	Lorne Daniel	292	44.0	
Conservative	Kathleen Woodhead	276		
Majority			11.9	
Turnout		1,261	20.5	
Labour win (new seat)				
Labour win (new seat)				

=== Loughton Forest ===
Loughton Forest (2)
Party	Candidate	Votes	%	±%
Loughton Residents	Kenneth Faulkner	560	45.1	
Loughton Residents	Peter House	557		
Conservative	James Brokenshire	485	39.0	
Conservative	Angela Metcalfe	464		
Labour	Jennifer Hart	131	10.5	
Labour	Susan Lipscombe	104		
Liberal Democrats	Christopher Spence	66	5.3	
Majority			6.0	
Turnout		2,367	38.0	
Loughton Residents win (new seat)				
Loughton Residents win (new seat)				

=== Loughton Roding ===
Loughton Roding (2)
Party	Candidate	Votes	%	±%
Labour	Stephen Murray	754	58.2	
Labour	Stanley Goodwin	700		
Conservative	Christine Howard	368	28.4	
Conservative	Gavin Harris	355		
Liberal Democrats	Peter Fuller	174	13.4	
Majority			29.8	
Turnout		2,351	38.9	
Labour win (new seat)				
Labour win (new seat)				

=== Loughton St. John's ===
Loughton St. John's (2)
Party	Candidate	Votes	%	±%
Loughton Residents	John Markham	594	52.8	
Loughton Residents	Caroline Pond	581		
Conservative	Anthony Barritt	368	32.7	
Conservative	Bryan Morris	326		
Labour	Angela Ayre	110	9.8	
Labour	Margot-Ingeborg Scott	98		
Liberal Democrats	Teresa Spencer	53	4.7	
Majority			20.1	
Turnout		2,130	32.5	
Loughton Residents win (new seat)				
Loughton Residents win (new seat)				

=== Loughton St. Mary's ===
Loughton St. Mary's (2)
Party	Candidate	Votes	%	±%
Loughton Residents	Dorothy Paddon	605	56.5	
Loughton Residents	Anthony Lee	579		
Conservative	James Hart	303	28.3	
Conservative	Roseanne Serrelli	254		
Labour	Thomas Owen	113	10.6	
Labour	Marion Taylor	109		
Liberal Democrats	Lucille Thompson	49	4.6	
Majority			28.2	
Turnout		2,012	32.2	
Loughton Residents win (new seat)				
Loughton Residents win (new seat)				

=== Lower Nazeing ===
Lower Nazeing (2)
Party	Candidate	Votes	%	±%
Conservative	Leo McKnight	643	38.0	
Independent	Daphne Borton	599	35.4	
Independent	John Carr	454		
Conservative	David Johnson	427		
UKIP	Martin Harvey	226	13.3	
Labour	Kelvin Morris	166	9.8	
Liberal Democrats	David Rumble	60	3.5	
Majority			2.6	
Turnout		2,575	42.6	
Conservative win (new seat)				
Independent win (new seat)				

=== Lower Sheering ===
Lower Sheering
Party	Candidate	Votes	%	±%
Conservative	John Harrington	244	67.6	
Labour	Roy Chapman	72	19.9	
Liberal Democrats	Roy Patient	45	12.5	
Majority		172	47.7	
Turnout		361	22.9	
Conservative win (new seat)				

=== Moreton and Fyfield ===
Moreton and Fyfield
Party	Candidate	Votes	%	±%
Liberal Democrats	Douglas Kelly	444	60.4	
Conservative	Elaine Williams	291	39.6	
Majority		153	20.8	
Turnout		735	42.0	
Liberal Democrats win (new seat)				

=== North Weald Bassett ===
North Weald Bassett (2)
Party	Candidate	Votes	%	±%
Conservative	David Stallan	902	80.0	
Conservative	Anne Grigg	856		
Liberal Democrats	Rita Gill	226	20.0	
Majority			59.9	
Turnout		1,984	33.1	
Conservative win (new seat)				
Conservative win (new seat)				

=== Passingford ===
Passingford
Party	Candidate	Votes	%	±%
Conservative	Diana Collins	452	88.1	
Labour	John Holness	61	11.9	
Majority		391	76.2	
Turnout		513	31.5	
Conservative win (new seat)				

=== Roydon ===
Roydon
Party	Candidate	Votes	%	±%
Independent	Norman Clark	236	43.4	
Conservative	Dennis Ramshaw	220	40.4	
Labour	Rachel Poulter	88	16.2	
Majority		16	3.0	
Turnout		544	31.6	
Independent win (new seat)				

=== Shelley ===
Shelley
Party	Candidate	Votes	%	±%
Labour	Ronald Barnes	238	55.9	
Conservative	Sarah Catt	118	27.7	
Liberal Democrats	Brian Surtees	70	16.4	
Majority		120	28.2	
Turnout		426	29.4	
Labour win (new seat)				

=== Theydon Bois ===
Theydon Bois (2)
Party	Candidate	Votes	%	±%
Conservative	Robert Glozier	681	45.4	
Conservative	Roy Newland	670		
Independent	Ronald Smith	482	32.1	
Liberal Democrats	Ann Furniss	338	22.5	
Liberal Democrats	Monica Richardson	310		
Majority			13.3	
Turnout		2,481	41.3	
Conservative win (new seat)				
Conservative win (new seat)				

=== Waltham Abbey High Beech ===
Waltham Abbey High Beech
Party	Candidate	Votes	%	±%
Conservative	Syd Stavrou	Unopposed		
Majority		N/A	100%	
Turnout		N/A	N/A	N/A
Conservative win (new seat)				

=== Waltham Abbey Honey Lane ===
Waltham Abbey Honey Lane (3)
Party	Candidate	Votes	%	±%
Conservative	Mark Gilding	671	65.9	
Conservative	Peter Johnson	663		
Conservative	Donald Spinks	653		
Liberal Democrats	Christine Akers	347	34.1	
Majority			31.8	
Turnout		2,334	22.0	
Conservative win (new seat)				
Conservative win (new seat)				
Conservative win (new seat)				

=== Waltham Abbey North East ===
Waltham Abbey North East (2)
Party	Candidate	Votes	%	±%
Conservative	Michael Dickins	650	71.7	
Conservative	Jamie Goldie	581		
Liberal Democrats	Sonia Davies	256	28.3	
Majority			43.5	
Turnout		1,487	28.5	
Conservative win (new seat)				
Conservative win (new seat)				

=== Waltham Abbey Paternoster ===
Waltham Abbey Paternoster (2)
Party	Candidate	Votes	%	±%
Conservative	Reginald Chidley	511	64.2	
Conservative	Richard Haines	511		
Labour	Fitzherbert Harewood	285	35.8	
Labour	Barry Johns	256		
Majority			28.4	
Turnout		1,563	24.2	
Conservative win (new seat)				
Conservative win (new seat)				

=== Waltham Abbey South West ===
Waltham Abbey South West (2)
Party	Candidate	Votes	%	±%
Conservative	Nicholas Austin	398	70.2	
Conservative	Harold Taylor	389		
Liberal Democrats	Ingrid Black	169	29.8	
Majority			40.4	
Turnout		956	20.4	
Conservative win (new seat)				
Conservative win (new seat)				
