= Loughton Residents Association =

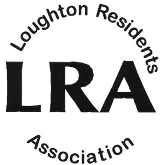
- Founded: 1981
- Headquarters: Loughton, Essex
- Ideology: Localism; Environmentalism
- Loughton Town Council: 20 / 22
- Epping Forest District Council: 10 / 54
- Essex County Council (Epping Forest seats): 0 / 7

Website
- www.loughtonresidents.co.uk

Loughton Residents Association is a residents association and local political party formed (as the Central Loughton Residents' Association) in 1981, and based in Loughton, Essex, United Kingdom.

The first such councillor to be elected was Howard Kleyn, elected to Essex County Council in May 1981.

== Election results ==
As of the 2024 Epping Forest District Council election Loughton Residents currently hold 13 seats on Epping Forest District Council.

As of 2024, the party holds 21 of the 22 seats on Loughton Town Council and one on Essex County Council.

In the 2026 election, the party lost their two County Council seats and they now have 11 district councillors.

=== Borough Council elections ===
Year	Councillors	Control
2002	6 / 58	No overall control
2003	6 / 58	No overall control
2004	6 / 58	No overall control
2006	5 / 58	Conservative
2007	5 / 58	Conservative
2008	6 / 58	Conservative
2010	11 / 58	Conservative
2011	10 / 58	Conservative
2012	12 / 58	Conservative
2014	12 / 58	Conservative
2015	12 / 58	Conservative
2016	13 / 58	Conservative
2018	13 / 58	Conservative
2019	13 / 58	Conservative
2021	13 / 58	Conservative
2022	13 / 58	Conservative
2023	13 / 58	Conservative
2024	13 / 58	Conservative
2026	12 / 54	No overall control

== See also ==
- Chris Pond (politician)
- Stephen Pewsey
- Politics of Loughton
