= Chris Pond (politician) =

English historian and local Essex politician (born 1949)

Cllr Chris Pond OBE

Essex County Councillor for Loughton Central
- Incumbent
- Assumed office 9 May 2005
- Preceded by: New seat

Personal details
- Born: Christopher Charles Pond; 1949 (age 76–77) Walthamstow, Essex, UK
- Party: Loughton Residents Association
- Spouse: Caroline Copeman
- Education: Queens' College, Cambridge

Christopher Charles Pond OBE (born 1949) is a British historian, librarian, and local government politician.

== Early life ==
Chris Pond was born in 1949 in Walthamstow, Essex (now part of the London Borough of Waltham Forest), and grew up in Chingford, moving to Loughton, Essex in 1981. He attended Sir George Monoux Grammar School and Queens' College, Cambridge. His PhD (faculty of geography and geology) was obtained in 1981 under Sir Clifford Darby.

Latterly an Honorary Fellow of the Chartered Institute of Library and Information Professionals, he was Head of Reference Services at the House of Commons Library, secretary and then chairman of the FDA House of Commons branch, and then for 15 years President of the Trade Union Side, House of Commons. He was awarded the Order of the British Empire in 2002. Officers of the House of Commons serve with complete political impartiality, and are generally debarred from seeking elected office, but Pond, as an independent, was permitted to stand whilst an officer of the House.

Pond is the author of numerous books and articles on the history of Essex and the Epping Forest area, and on railways and architectural history; and has served in various capacities in the Victorian Society and Loughton & District Historical Society, and as president of the Walthamstow Historical Society.

== Political career ==
A member of the Loughton Residents Association, Pond has been an elected independent politician, as town councillor on Loughton Town Council since 1996, district councillor on Epping Forest District Council since 2014, and county councillor on Essex County Council since 2005, where he was (2017) leader of the Non-aligned Group and (in 2021) Leader of the Opposition. He was a member, and latterly Chairman, of the Lopping Hall Trust charity from 2000 to 2014.

He was instrumental in securing refusal of an application to demolish most of the cordite factory at the Waltham Abbey Royal Gunpowder Mills in 2016. At Epping Forest District Council in 2021, he moved the motion and outlined the reasons for rejecting an application to build a large depot on green belt land at Waltham Abbey for Next plc, a decision that was subsequently upheld by the Planning Inspectorate and was reported as a victory for the countryside over big business.

During the years 1997 to 2005, he was often confused with Chris Pond, then MP for Gravesham, because of the unusual coincidence of the shared name and age.

== Personal life ==
He married Caroline Copeman in 1973.

== Elections contested ==
Essex County Council elections

Date of election	Constituency	Party	Votes	%	Result
2005	Loughton Central	Loughton Residents	2,734	35.2	Elected
2009	Loughton Central	Loughton Residents	2,764	55.2	Elected
2013	Loughton Central	Loughton Residents	1,945	60.7	Elected
2017	Loughton Central	Loughton Residents	2,824	69.3	Elected
2021	Loughton Central	Loughton Residents	2,994	66.3	Elected

Epping Forest District Council elections

Date of election	Constituency	Party	Votes	%	Result
2004	Loughton Fairmead	Loughton Residents	245	25.3	Not elected (2nd)
2008	Loughton Forest	Loughton Residents	592	39.6	Not elected (2nd)
2014	Loughton Broadway	Loughton Residents	423	41.1	Elected
2018	Loughton Broadway	Loughton Residents	678	39.4	Elected
2022	Loughton Broadway	Loughton Residents	488	61.9	Elected

== Selected bibliography ==
- The Railway to Walthamstow and Chingford (1970, with others as part of the Line 112 Group)
- Walks in Loughton's Forest: Short Epping Forest Walks in and Around Loughton by Chris Pond and Caroline Pond (Paperback - 3 Mar 2007)
- The Loughton Railway 150 Years on: The Leyton-Woodford-Loughton Railway from Eastern Counties to Central Line by Chris Pond, Ian Strugnell, and Ted Martin (Paperback - 10 Jun 2006)
- The Early History of the House of Commons Library: Reports from Standing Committees on the Library of the House 1840-1856 (House of Commons Library Document)
- The Buildings of Loughton (2nd ed., 2009)
- Larkswood : a history of Larkswood school, formerly South Chingford Primary, New Road, Chingford 1906-2006; by John Conen with Chris Pond. Loughton: The authors, 2006. 60 p., [8 p. of plates. ISBN 095444261X.]
