= Buckhurst Hill West (ward) =

Coordinates: 51.624°N 0.041°E

- Electoral ward for the Epping Forest District Council
- Buckhurst Hill West ward boundaries since 2024
- District: Epping Forest
- County: Essex
- Population: 7,023 (2021) (Note: 2021 Census data reported for 2002–2024 ward boundaries)
- Electorate: 5,198 (2024)
- Major settlements: Buckhurst Hill
- Area: 2.659 square kilometres (1.027 sq mi)

Current electoral ward
- Created: 1979
- Councillors: 3
- GSS code: E05004149 (2002–2024); E05015725 (2024–present)

Buckhurst Hill West is an electoral ward in Epping Forest District, United Kingdom, since 1979. It is one of two wards that represents Buckhurst Hill, the other one being Buckhurst Hill East and Whitebridge, created in 2024. The ward returns three councillors to the Epping Forest District Council.

== Epping Forest council elections since 2024 ==
There was a revision of ward boundaries in Epping Forest in 2024 with all seats up for election that year.

=== 2024 election ===
The election took place on 2 May 2024.

2024 Epping Forest District Council election: Buckhurst Hill West
Party	Candidate	Votes	%	±%
Conservative	Bob Church	819	46.6	
Conservative	Ken Williamson	800	45.5	
Conservative	Smruti Patel	706	40.2	
Green	Rebecca Fricker	581	33.0	
Green	Kathryn Radley	550	31.3	
Labour	Tom Kasperkowicz	419	23.8	
EFIG	Lyubka Mihailova	340	19.3	
Liberal Democrats	Ishvinder Matharu	330	18.8	
Turnout		1,762	34	
Registered electors		5,198		
Conservative win (new boundaries)				
Conservative win (new boundaries)				
Conservative win (new boundaries)				

== 2002–2024 Epping Forest council elections ==
There was a revision of ward boundaries in Epping Forest in 2002 with all seats up for election that year. The subsequent election cycle for the first Buckhurst Hill West seat was 2003, 2007, 2011, 2015, 2019 and 2023. The cycle for the second seat was 2004, 2008, 2012, 2016 and 2021. The cycle for the third seat was 2006, 2010, 2014, 2018 and 2022.

=== 2023 election ===
The election took place on 4 May 2023.

2023 Epping Forest District Council election: Buckhurst Hill West
Party	Candidate	Votes	%	±%
Conservative	Aniket Patel	730	44.4	–14.1
Labour	Tom Kasperkowicz	273	16.6	N/A
Independent	Jo Share-Berina	222	13.5	N/A
Liberal Democrats	Ishvinder Matharu	190	11.6	–21.2
Green	Alan Fricker	147	8.9	N/A
Independent	Lyubka Vesselinov	51	3.1	N/A
Shared Ground	Thomas Hall	32	1.9	–6.8
Majority		457	27.8	+2.1
Turnout		1,653	31.6	–1.3
Registered electors		5,226		
Conservative hold		Swing	N/A	

=== 2022 election ===
The election took place on 5 May 2022.

2022 Epping Forest District Council election: Buckhurst Hill West
Party	Candidate	Votes	%	±%
Conservative	Smruti Patel	1,006	58.5	+1.0
Liberal Democrats	Ishvinder Matharu	564	32.8	+23.5
Shared Ground	Thomas Hall	150	8.7	+4.6
Majority		442	25.7	
Turnout		1,741	32.9	
Conservative hold		Swing	▼11.3	

=== 2021 election ===
The election took place on 6 May 2021.

2021 Epping Forest District Council election: Buckhurst Hill West
Party	Candidate	Votes	%	±%
Conservative	Kenneth Williamson	1,228	57.5	▲9.8
Green	Anne Redelinghuys	351	16.4	N/A
Labour	Onike Gollo	238	11.1	▲5.0
Liberal Democrats	Ish Singh	200	9.3	▼34.2
Young People's	Thomas Hall	88	4.1	▲1.7
Majority		877	41.1	▲36.9
Turnout		2,135	40.1	▲2.1
Conservative hold		Swing		

=== 2019 election ===
The election took place on 2 May 2019.

2019 Epping Forest District Council election: Buckhurst Hill West
Party	Candidate	Votes	%	±%
Conservative	Aniket Patel	977	47.7	▼0.3
Liberal Democrats	Joseph Barkham	891	43.5	▲4.4
Labour	Jill Bostock	126	6.1	New
Young People's	Thomas Hall	51	2.4	New
Majority		86	4.2	▼4.7
Turnout		2,045	38.0	▲3.0
Conservative hold		Swing		

=== 2018 election ===
The election took place on 3 May 2018.

2018 Epping Forest District Council election: Buckhurst Hill West
Party	Candidate	Votes	%	±%
Conservative	Jo Share-Bernia	921	48.0	▼10.7
Liberal Democrats	Joseph Barkham	750	39.1	▲20.2
Green	Roger Neville	246	12.8	▼7.0
Majority		171	8.9	▼30.0
Turnout		1,917	35%	▲2.0
Conservative hold		Swing		

=== 2016 election ===
The election took place on 5 May 2016.

2016 Epping Forest District Council election: Buckhurst Hill West
Party	Candidate	Votes	%	±%
Conservative	Gavin Chambers	1,033	58.7	−4.8
Green	Elanor Furlong	348	19.8	+10.4
Liberal Democrats	Joseph Barkham	333	18.9	+3.3
Young People's	Gerard Wadsworth	46	2.6	N/A
Majority		685	38.9	
Turnout		1,760	33.0	
Conservative hold		Swing		

=== 2015 election ===
The election took place on 7 May 2015.

2015 Epping Forest District Council election: Buckhurst Hill West
Party	Candidate	Votes	%	±%
Conservative	Aniket Patel	2,450	63.3	▲1.9
Liberal Democrats	Chris Greaves	604	15.6	▲4.8
Labour	Angela Ayre	455	11.8	▲2.2
Green	Roger Neville	363	9.4	▼5.7
Majority		1,846	47.7	▼1.4
Turnout		3,872	72%	▲37.0
Conservative hold		Swing		

=== 2014 election ===
The election took place on 22 May 2014.

2014 Epping Forest District Council election: Buckhurst Hill West
Party	Candidate	Votes	%	±%
Conservative	Sylvia Watson	1,136	61.4	+14.5
Green	Roger Neville	279	15.1	+9.0
Liberal Democrats	Garry Sadler	219	11.8	–19.1
Labour	Andrew Forsey	178	9.6	+1.7
Young People's	Gerard Mark Wadsworth	37	2.0	N/A
Majority		857	46.3	
Turnout		1,849	35.0	
Conservative hold		Swing		

=== 2012 election ===
The election took place on 3 May 2012.

2012 Epping Forest District Council election: Buckhurst Hill West
Party	Candidate	Votes	%	±%
Conservative	Gavin Chambers	765	46.9	−3.7
Liberal Democrats	Sarah Hannah Unwin	504	30.9	−2.2
UKIP	Gerard Wadsworth	134	8.2	+1.5
Labour	Ben Spencer	129	7.9	N/A
Green	Steven Neville	99	6.0	−0.8
Majority		261	16.0	−1.4
Turnout		1,631	31.0	−15.0
Conservative gain from Liberal Democrats		Swing		

=== 2011 election ===
The election took place on 5 May 2011.

2011 Epping Forest District Council election: Buckhurst Hill West
Party	Candidate	Votes	%	±%
Conservative	Haluk Ulkun	1,211	50.7	+3.5
Liberal Democrats	Patricia Wiltshire	793	33.2	−12.7
Green	Benjamin Wille	163	6.8	+3.9
UKIP	Gerard Wadsworth	162	6.8	+2.8
Independent	Andrew Forsey	61	2.6	N/A
Majority		418	17.4	+16.1
Turnout		2,390	46.0	−26.0
Conservative hold		Swing		

=== 2010 election ===
The election took place on 6 May 2010.

2010 Epping Forest District Council election: Buckhurst Hill West
Party	Candidate	Votes	%	±%
Conservative	Sylvia Watson	1,827	47.2	▼1.5
Liberal Democrats	Ann Haigh	1,775	45.9	▼5.4
UKIP	Gerard Wadsworth	153	4.0	N/A
Green	Ben Wille	112	2.9	N/A
Majority		52	1.3	
Turnout		3,867	72.4	▲33.8
Conservative gain from Liberal Democrats		Swing		

=== 2008 election ===
The election took place on 1 May 2008.

2008 Epping Forest District Council election: Buckhurst Hill West
Party	Candidate	Votes	%	±%
Liberal Democrats	Jill Sutcliffe	1,054	51.3	▲9.7
Conservative	Bob Church	1,000	48.7	▼10.0
Majority		54	2.6	▼14.2
Turnout		2,054	38.6	▲5.6
Liberal Democrats hold		Swing		

=== 2007 election ===
The election took place on 3 May 2007.

2007 Epping Forest District Council election: Buckhurst Hill West
Party	Candidate	Votes	%	±%
Conservative	Haluk Ulkun	1,003	58.4	▲19.7
Liberal Democrats	Mick Spence	714	41.6	▼19.7
Majority		289	16.8	▼5.8
Turnout		1,717	33.0	▼9.7
Conservative hold		Swing		

=== 2006 election ===
The election took place on 4 May 2006.

2006 Epping Forest District Council election: Buckhurst Hill West
Party	Candidate	Votes	%	±%
Liberal Democrats	Ann Haigh	1,066	51.2	▼0.5
Conservative	Robert Church	1,015	48.8	▲0.5
Conservative	Haluk Ulkun	1,009		
Liberal Democrats	Carol Taylor	970		
Turnout		4,060	42.7	▲1.5
Liberal Democrats hold		Swing		
Conservative gain from Liberal Democrats		Swing		

=== 2004 election ===
The election took place on 10 June 2004.

2004 Epping Forest District Council election: Buckhurst Hill West
Party	Candidate	Votes	%	±%
Liberal Democrats	Michael Heavens	1,049	51.7	▼4.1
Conservative	Haluk Ulkun	981	48.3	▲4.1
Majority		68	3.4	▼8.2
Turnout		2,030	41.2	▲11.6
Liberal Democrats hold		Swing		

=== 2003 election ===
The election took place on 1 May 2003.

2003 Epping Forest District Council election: Buckhurst Hill West
Party	Candidate	Votes	%	±%
Liberal Democrats	Robert Goold	803	55.8	▲1.4
Conservative	Haluk Ulkun	635	44.2	▼1.4
Majority		168	11.6	▲3.8
Turnout		1,438	29.6	▲3.4
Liberal Democrats hold		Swing		

=== 2002 election ===
The election took place on 2 May 2002.

2002 Epping Forest District Council election: Buckhurst Hill West
Party	Candidate	Votes	%	±%
Liberal Democrats	Ann Haigh	1,002	54.4	
Liberal Democrats	Michael Heavens	931		
Liberal Democrats	Robert Goold	912		
Conservative	Richard Watts	840	45.6	
Conservative	Neil Cohen	824		
Conservative	Haluk Ulkun	741		
Majority			8.8	
Turnout		5,250	26.2	
Liberal Democrats win (new boundaries)				
Liberal Democrats win (new boundaries)				
Liberal Democrats win (new boundaries)				

== 1979–2002 Epping Forest council elections ==
There was a revision of ward boundaries in Epping Forest in 1979 with all seats up for election that year. The subsequent election cycle for the first Buckhurst Hill West seat was 1980, 1984, 1988, 1992, 1996 and 2000. The cycle for the second seat was 1982, 1986, 1990, 1994 and 1998. The cycle for the thirst seat was 1983, 1987, 1991, 1995 and 1999.
