= Buckhurst Hill East and Whitebridge (ward) =

Electoral ward in Essex, England

- Electoral ward for the Epping Forest District Council
- Buckhurst Hill East and Whitebridge ward boundaries
- District: Epping Forest
- County: Essex
- Major settlements: Buckhurst Hill, Loughton

Current electoral ward
- Created: 2024
- Number of members: 1
- Councillor: James Small
- Created from: Buckhurst Hill East, Loughton Roding
- GSS code: E05015724

Buckhurst Hill East and Whitebridge is an electoral ward in Epping Forest District, Essex, England, created in 2024. It is, with Buckhurst Hill West, one of two wards that represent Buckhurst Hill. The ward returns three councillors to the Epping Forest District Council.

== Epping Forest council elections ==
=== 2026 election ===
The election took place on 7 May 2026.

2026 Epping Forest District Council election: Buckhurst Hill East and Whitebridge
| Party | Candidate | Votes | % | ±% |
|---|---|---|---|---|
| Reform | James Small | 1,060 | 38 | 38 |
| Green | Elizabeth Gabbett | 932 | 33 | 8 |
| Conservative | Joanna Farmer | 547 | 20 | −6 |
| Liberal Democrats | Naomi Davies | 244 | 9 | 9 |
| Turnout | | 2783 | 48 | 15 |
| Registered electors | | 5,827 | | |
| Reform win | | | | |

=== 2024 election ===
The election took place on 2 May 2024.

2024 Epping Forest District Council election: Buckhurst Hill East and Whitebridge
| Party | Candidate | Votes | % | ±% |
|---|---|---|---|---|
| Loughton Residents | Rose Brookes | 792 | 16 | − |
| Loughton Residents | Barbara Cohen | 646 | 13 | − |
| Green | Elizabeth Gabbett | 639 | 13 | − |
| Loughton Residents | Chris Kent | 617 | 13 | |
| Green | Dewole Aradeon | 596 | 12 | |
| Conservative | Jane Bagshaw | 375 | 8 | |
| Labour | Alain Laviolette | 369 | 8 | |
| Conservative | Alexia Sparrow | 327 | 7 | |
| Conservative | Marshall Vance | 320 | 7 | |
| Conservative | Ben Brown | 186 | 4 | |
| Turnout | | 4,867 | 33 | |
| Registered electors | | 5,796 | | |
| Loughton Residents win (new seat) | | | | |
| Loughton Residents win (new seat) | | | | |
| Green win (new seat) | | | | |
