= 2024 Epping Forest District Council election =

Local election in Epping Forest, England

- 2 May 2024

All 54 seats to Epping Forest District Council 28 seats needed for a majority
	First party	Second party	Third party
Leader	Chris Whitbread	Chris Pond	Jon Whitehouse
Party	Conservative	Loughton Residents	Liberal Democrats
Leader's seat	Roydon & Lower Nazeing	Loughton St. John's	Epping East
Last election	34 seats, 48.3%	13 seats, N/A	6 seats, 22.4%
Seats before	34	13	5
Seats won	29	13	7
Seat change	▼5	Steady	▲1
Popular vote	11,326	5,020	4,654
Percentage	38.2%	17.0%	15.7%
Swing	▼10.1%	N/A	▼6.7%
	Fourth party	Fifth party	Sixth party
Leader	None	Simon Heap (Outgoing)	Martin Morris
Party	Independent inc. EFIG & ERIG	Green	Labour
Leader's seat	N/A	Seat abolished	Waltham Abbey North
Last election	3 seats, 4.6%	2 seats, 2.1%	0 seats, 19.7%
Seats before	4 (Note: Cllr Deborah Barlow (Grange Hill) Cllr Lisa Morgan (Grange Hill), Cllr Stephen Murray (Loughton Roding), and Cllr Cherry McCredie (Epping East) who resigned from the Liberal Democrats)	2	0
Seats won	3	1	1
Seat change	Steady	▼1	▲1
Popular vote	5,285	1,220	6,667
Percentage	11.1%	4.1%	22.5%
Swing	▲7.4%	▲2.0%	▲2.8%
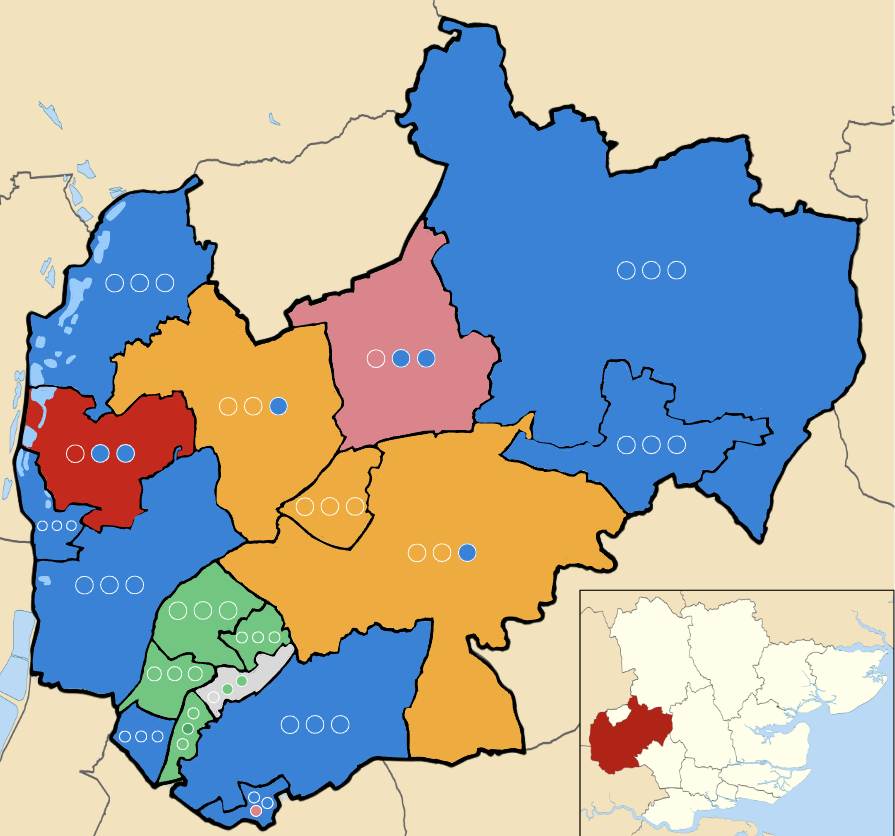
- Results of the 2024 Epping Forest District Council election (top placing candidate shading an entire ward, with second and third placed candidates places in order in the circles)

- Council composition following the election
Leader before election
Chris Whitbread
Conservative
Leader after election
Chris Whitbread
Conservative

The 2024 Epping Forest District Council election was held on Thursday 2 May 2024, alongside the other local elections in the United Kingdom held on the same day. All 54 members of Epping Forest District Council in Essex were elected following boundary changes. The council remained under Conservative majority control.

== Background ==
Since its creation in 1974, only the Conservatives have ever formed majorities on the council. The party held control until 1994, before retaking the council from no overall control in 2007. The Conservatives briefly fell behind both Labour and the Liberal Democrats in 1996, but regained their status as the largest party in 1999.

In the previous 2023 election, the Conservatives lost 1 seat with 48.3% of the vote, the Liberal Democrats gained 2 with 22.4%, independents and the Green Party gained and lost no seats with 4.6% and 2.1% respectively, and the British Democratic Party lost representation with 1.3% (their one councillor had been elected for the For Britain Movement). The Loughton Residents Association maintained their 13 seats.

== Boundary changes ==
Epping Forest usually elects its councillors in thirds, on a 4-year cycle. However, following boundary changes, all councillors will be elected to the new wards. The change reduces the number of councillors by 4.

Old wards	No. of seats	New wards	No. of seats
Broadley Common, Epping Upland and Nazeing	1	Buckhurst Hill East and Whitebridge	3
Buckhurst Hill East	2	Buckhurst Hill West	3
Buckhurst Hill West	3	Chigwell with Lambourne	3
Chigwell Row	1	Epping East	3
Chigwell Village	2	Epping West and Rural	3
Chipping Ongar, Greensted and Marden Ash	2	Grange Hill	3
Epping Hemnall	3	Loughton Fairmead	3
Epping Lindsey and Thornwood Common	3	Loughton Forest	3
Grange Hill	3	Loughton Roding	3
Hastingwood, Matching and Sheering Village	1	Loughton St John's	3
High Ongar, Willingale and The Rodings	1	North Weald Bassett	3
Lambourne	1	Ongar	3
Loughton Alderton	2	Roydon and Lower Nazeing	3
Loughton Broadway	2	Rural East	3
Loughton Fairmead	2	Theydon Bois with Passingford	3
Loughton Forest	2	Waltham Abbey North	3
Loughton Roding	2	Waltham Abbey South and Rural	3
Loughton St John's	2	Waltham Abbey West	3
Loughton St Mary's	2		
Lower Nazeing	2		
Lower Sheering	1		
Moreton and Fyfield	1		
North Weald Bassett	2		
Passingford	1		
Roydon	1		
Shelley	1		
Theydon Bois	2		
Waltham Abbey High Beach	1		
Waltham Abbey Honey Lane	3		
Waltham Abbey North East	2		
Waltham Abbey Paternoster	2		
Waltham Abbey South West	2		

== Summary ==
Prior to the election the council was under Conservative majority control. The Conservatives retained their majority at this election, albeit with a reduced share of the seats.

=== Council composition ===
After 2023 election		Before 2024 election		After 2024 election	
Party	Seats	Party	Seats	Party	Seats
Conservative	34	Conservative	34	Conservative	29
Loughton Residents	13	Loughton Residents	13	Loughton Residents	13
Liberal Democrats	6	Liberal Democrats	5	Liberal Democrats	7
Independent	2	Independent	4	Independent	3
Green	2	Green	2	Green	1
Labour	0	Labour	0	Labour	1

Changes:

- January 2024: Cherry McCredie leaves Liberal Democrats to sit as an independent

=== Election result ===
2024 Epping Forest District Council election
Party	Candidates	Seats	Gains	Losses	Net gain/loss	Seats %	Votes %	Votes	+/−
Conservative	48	29	0	3	▼5	53.7	38.2	11,326	▼10.1
Labour	22	1	1	0	▲1	1.8	22.5	6,667	▲2.8
Loughton Residents	14	13	0	0	Steady	24.0	17.0	5,020	N/A
Liberal Democrats	15	7	1	0	▲1	12.9	15.7	4,654	▼6.7
Epping Forest Independents	7	2	2	0	▲2	3.7	7.5	2,647	N/A
Green	4	1	0	1	▼1	1.8	4.1	1,220	▲2.0
Independent	13	1	0	0	Steady	1.8	3.6	1,284	▼1.0
Epping & Rural Independents	4	0	0	0	Steady	0.0	3.2	1,143	N/A
British Democratic	1	0	0	0	Steady	0.0	1.0	323	▼0.3
UKIP	1	0	0	0	Steady	0.0	0.8	235	N/A
Reform	1	0	0	0	Steady	0.0	0.7	227	▲0.3
TUSC	2	0	0	0	Steady	0.0	0.7	222	▲0.3
English Democrat	1	0	0	0	Steady	0.0	0.6	227	▲0.4

==== By ward ====
Shaded figures indicate that a party won at least one of three ward seats, whilst boldened figures indicate which party won the popular vote in each ward.

Ward	Conservative	Labour	Liberal Democrat	LRA	Green	Independent inc. EFIG / E&RI	Reform UK	UKIP	English Democrats	British Democrats
Ward	%	%	%	%	%	%	%	%	%	%
Buckhurst Hill East & Whitebridge	15.9	15.6	–	33.5	27.1	7.9	–	–	–	–
Buckhurst Hill West	32.9	16.8	13.3	–	23.3	13.7	–	–	–	–
Chigwell with Lambourne	56.6	21.2	–	–	–	22.2	–	–	–	–
Epping East	20.3	10.6	44.7	–	–	24.3	–	–	–	–
Epping West & Rural	36.1	8.5	41.0	–	–	14.4	–	–	–	–
Grange Hill	35.6	20.5	9.1	–	–	34.8	–	–	–	–
Loughton Fairmead	14.1	22.0	–	63.9	–	–	–	–	–	–
Loughton Forest	17.1	13.2	8.4	57.9	–	–	–	–	–	–
Loughton Roding	5.5	13.7	–	34.7	–	46.1	–	–	–	–
Loughton St. John's	19.7	14.8	–	65.5	–	–	–	–	–	–
North Weald Bassett	32.0	20.8	–	–	–	47.2	–	–	–	–
Ongar	60.7	22.5	16.8	–	–	–	–	–	–	–
Roydon & Lower Nazeing	55.6	29.6	–	–	–	–	–	14.8	–	–
Rural East	33.1	16.4	28.2	–	–	–	13.1	–	9.2	–
Theydon Bois with Passingford	34.6	7.8	47.1	–	–	10.5	–	–	–	–
Waltham Abbey North	32.7	35.2	–	–	–	–	–	–	–	21.1
Waltham Abbey South & Rural	58.7	41.3	–	–	–	–	–	–	–	–
Waltham Abbey West	55.5	44.5	–	–	–	–	–	–	–	–

==== Close seats ====
Third place seat where the margin of victory was under 5%:

1. Theydon Bois with Passingford, 0.2% (3 votes)
2. Epping West & Rural, 0.9% (17 votes)
3. Buckhurst Hill East & Whitebridge, 1.2% (22 votes)
4. Rural East, 2.2% (40 votes)
5. Waltham Abbey West, 5.1% (66 votes)

== Ward results ==
The Statement of Persons Nominated, which details the candidates standing in each ward, was released by Epping Forest District Council following the close of nominations on 8 April 2024.

=== Buckhurst Hill East & Whitebridge ===
Buckhurst Hill East & Whitebridge (3 seats)
Party	Candidate	Votes	%	±%
Loughton Residents	Rose Brookes*	792	42.1	
Loughton Residents	Barbara Cohen	646	34.3	
Green	Elizabeth Gabbett*	639	34.0	
Loughton Residents	Chris Kent	617	32.8	
Green	Dewole Aradeon	596	31.7	
Conservative	Jane Bagshaw	375	19.9	
Labour	Alain Laviolette	369	19.6	
Conservative	Alexia Sparrow	327	17.4	
Conservative	Marshall Vance	320	17.0	
Independent	Ben Brown	186	9.9	
Turnout		1,906	33	
Registered electors		5,796		
Loughton Residents win (new seat)				
Loughton Residents win (new seat)				
Green win (new seat)				

=== Buckhurst Hill West ===
Buckhurst Hill West (3 seats)
Party	Candidate	Votes	%	±%
Conservative	Bob Church	819	46.6	
Conservative	Ken Williamson*	800	45.5	
Conservative	Smruti Patel*	706	40.2	
Green	Rebecca Fricker	581	33.0	
Green	Kathryn Radley	550	31.3	
Labour	Tom Kasperkowicz	419	23.8	
EFIG	Lyubka Mihailova	340	19.3	
Liberal Democrats	Ishvinder Matharu	330	18.8	
Turnout		1,762	34	
Registered electors		5,198		
Conservative win (new seat)				
Conservative win (new seat)				
Conservative win (new seat)				

=== Chigwell with Lambourne ===
Chigwell with Lambourne (3 seats)
Party	Candidate	Votes	%	±%
Conservative	Craig McCann*	1,164	64.2	
Conservative	Kaz Rizvi*	1,018	56.1	
Conservative	Darshan Sunger*	947	52.2	
EFIG	Shahzaad Malik	457	25.2	
Labour	Tony Casaluci	437	24.1	
Turnout		1,826	32	
Registered electors		5,645		
Conservative win (new seat)				
Conservative win (new seat)				
Conservative win (new seat)				

=== Epping East ===
Epping East (3 seats)
Party	Candidate	Votes	%	±%
Liberal Democrats	Janet Whitehouse*	1,100	57.1	
Liberal Democrats	Jon Whitehouse*	1,020	53.0	
Liberal Democrats	Edward Barnard	850	44.1	
Epping & Rural Independent	Cherry McCredie*	599	31.1	
Conservative	Mari-Louise Whitbread	501	26.0	
Conservative	James Abbott	477	24.8	
Conservative	Ian Roberts	467	24.2	
Labour	Paul Thomas	262	13.6	
Turnout		1,937	35	
Registered electors		5,521		
Liberal Democrats win (new seat)				
Liberal Democrats win (new seat)				
Liberal Democrats win (new seat)				

=== Epping West & Rural ===
Epping West & Rural (3 seats)
Party	Candidate	Votes	%	±%
Liberal Democrats	Mandy George	945	47.3	
Liberal Democrats	Razia Sharif*	926	46.4	
Conservative	Holly Whitbread*	832	41.7	
Liberal Democrats	Elaine Thatcher	815	40.8	
Conservative	Andy Green*	751	37.6	
Conservative	Peter Murray	699	35.0	
Epping & Rural Independent	Nigel Avey	332	16.6	
Labour	Sean Voitov	196	9.8	
Turnout		2,002	39	
Registered electors		5,130		
Liberal Democrats win (new seat)				
Liberal Democrats win (new seat)				
Conservative win (new seat)				

=== Grange Hill ===
Grange Hill (3 seats)
Party	Candidate	Votes	%	±%
Conservative	Alan Lion*	791	42.5	
EFIG	Lisa Morgan*	775	41.6	
Conservative	Rashni Chahal Holden	702	37.7	
Conservative	Osman Ali	631	33.9	
EFIG	Debby Rye	592	31.8	
Labour	Angela Ayre	456	24.5	
EFIG	Alana Aradeon	365	19.6	
Liberal Democrats	Steve Hume	203	10.9	
Turnout		1,877	31	
Registered electors		6,142		
Conservative win (new seat)				
Independent win (new seat)				
Conservative win (new seat)				

=== Loughton Fairmead ===
Loughton Fairmead (3 seats)
Party	Candidate	Votes	%	±%
Loughton Residents	Louise Mead*	966	74.5	
Loughton Residents	Will Kauffman	761	58.7	
Loughton Residents	Arash Ardakani	688	53.1	
Labour	Gareth Rawlings	332	25.6	
Labour	Alastair Smith	287	22.1	
Conservative	Bobby Nagpal	213	16.4	
Turnout		1,306	24	
Registered electors		5,472		
Loughton Residents win (new seat)				
Loughton Residents win (new seat)				
Loughton Residents win (new seat)				

=== Loughton Forest ===
Loughton Forest (3 seats)
Party	Candidate	Votes	%	±%
Loughton Residents	Roger Baldwin*	1,220	67.0	
Loughton Residents	Michael Owen*	1,171	64.3	
Loughton Residents	Ian Allgood*	1,167	64.1	
Conservative	Sarah Metcalfe	361	19.8	
Conservative	Katharine Hawes	354	19.4	
Conservative	Jan Ridding	288	15.8	
Labour	Tom Draper	279	15.3	
Liberal Democrats	Naomi Davies	178	9.8	
TUSC	Scott Jones	70	3.8	
Turnout		1,831	35	
Registered electors		5,295		
Loughton Residents win (new seat)				
Loughton Residents win (new seat)				
Loughton Residents win (new seat)				

=== Loughton Roding ===
Loughton Roding (3 seats)
Party	Candidate	Votes	%	±%
Independent	Stephen Murray*	1,098	74.4	
Loughton Residents	Sheree Rackham	826	56.0	
Loughton Residents	Chidi Nweke*	767	52.0	
Labour	Debbie Wild	327	22.2	
EFIG	Malachi Fontenelle	186	12.6	
Conservative	Tim Parry	130	8.8	
Turnout		1,481	27	
Registered electors		5,446		
Independent win (new seat)				
Loughton Residents win (new seat)				
Loughton Residents win (new seat)				

=== Loughton St. John's ===
Loughton St. John's (3 seats)
Party	Candidate	Votes	%	±%
Loughton Residents	Chris Pond*	1,216	75.1	
Loughton Residents	Howard Kauffman*	1,106	68.3	
Loughton Residents	Graham Wiskin	1,012	62.5	
Conservative	Valerie Metcalfe	366	22.6	
Labour	Emma Roberts	274	16.9	
Turnout		1,625	30	
Registered electors		5,363		
Loughton Residents win (new seat)				
Loughton Residents win (new seat)				
Loughton Residents win (new seat)				

=== North Weald Bassett ===
North Weald Bassett (3 seats)
Party	Candidate	Votes	%	±%
EFIG	Tom Bromwich	889	58.8	
Conservative	Nigel Bedford*	604	40.0	
Conservative	Les Burrows*	540	35.7	
Conservative	Les Mills	472	31.2	
Labour	Kevin Hind	392	25.9	
Labour	Paul Stockton	382	25.3	
Turnout		1,521	31	
Registered electors		4,981		
Independent win (new seat)				
Conservative win (new seat)				
Conservative win (new seat)				

=== Ongar ===
Ongar (3 seats)
Party	Candidate	Votes	%	±%
Conservative	Mary Dadd	911	60.2	
Conservative	Jaymey McIvor*	828	54.7	
Conservative	Paul Keska*	827	54.7	
Labour	Alison Wingfield	337	22.3	
Labour	Ronald Huish	332	21.9	
Labour	Timothy White	296	19.6	
Liberal Democrats	Monica Richardson	252	16.7	
Turnout		1,525	27	
Registered electors		5,742		
Conservative win (new seat)				
Conservative win (new seat)				
Conservative win (new seat)				

=== Roydon & Lower Nazeing ===
Roydon & Lower Nazeing (3 seats)
Party	Candidate	Votes	%	±%
Conservative	Richard Bassett*	883	63.6	
Conservative	Chris Whitbread*	715	51.5	
Conservative	Ronda Pugsley*	678	48.8	
Labour Co-op	Alex Kyriacou	470	33.8	
UKIP	Martin Harvey	235	16.9	
Turnout		1,393	26	
Registered electors		5,460		
Conservative win (new seat)				
Conservative win (new seat)				
Conservative win (new seat)				

=== Rural East ===
Rural East (3 seats)
Party	Candidate	Votes	%	±%
Conservative	Ray Balcombe*	817	43.8	
Conservative	Richard Morgan*	774	41.5	
Conservative	Ian Hadley*	737	39.5	
Liberal Democrats	Lesley Paine	697	37.3	
Liberal Democrats	Bijal Pattani	465	24.9	
Labour	Ann Huish	405	21.7	
Reform	Peter Bell	324	17.4	
English Democrat	Robin Tilbrook	227	12.2	
Turnout		1,876	30	
Registered electors		6,249		
Conservative win (new seat)				
Conservative win (new seat)				
Conservative win (new seat)				

=== Theydon Bois with Passingford ===
Theydon Bois with Passingford (3 seats)
Party	Candidate	Votes	%	±%
Liberal Democrats	Clive Amos*	949	50.7	
Liberal Democrats	Tippy Cornish	882	47.1	
Conservative	Sue Jones	698	37.3	
Liberal Democrats	Richard Griffiths	695	37.1	
Conservative	Heather Brady*	647	34.5	
Conservative	John Philip*	581	31.0	
Epping & Rural Independent	Christine Burgess	212	11.3	
Epping & Rural Independent	Louis Turchin	211	11.3	
Labour	Christine Mortimer	157	8.4	
Turnout		1,880	36	
Registered electors		5,175		
Liberal Democrats win (new seat)				
Liberal Democrats win (new seat)				
Conservative win (new seat)				

=== Waltham Abbey North ===
Waltham Abbey North (3 seats)
Party	Candidate	Votes	%	±%
Labour	Martin Morris	520	41.2	
Conservative	Jeane Lea*	483	38.3	
Conservative	David Stocker*	447	35.4	
Conservative	Fraser Scott	417	33.0	
British Democratic	Julian Leppert	323	25.6	
TUSC	Adeline Walsh	152	12.0	
Turnout		1,268	24	
Registered electors		5,371		
Labour win (new seat)				
Conservative win (new seat)				
Conservative win (new seat)				

=== Waltham Abbey South & Rural ===
Waltham Abbey South & Rural (3 seats)
Party	Candidate	Votes	%	±%
Conservative	Steven Heather*	715	57.7	
Conservative	Maria Markham*	676	54.5	
Conservative	Tim Matthews*	622	50.2	
Labour	Simon Harris	503	40.6	
Turnout		1,261	24	
Registered electors		5,347		
Conservative win (new seat)				
Conservative win (new seat)				
Conservative win (new seat)				

=== Waltham Abbey West ===
Waltham Abbey West (3 seats)
Party	Candidate	Votes	%	±%
Conservative	Joseph Parsons*	663	51.7	
Conservative	Jodie Lucas*	618	48.2	
Conservative	Shane Yerrell*	598	46.6	
Labour	Bob Greyson	532	41.5	
Turnout		1,296	23	
Registered electors		5,550		
Conservative win (new seat)				
Conservative win (new seat)				
Conservative win (new seat)				

== Parish council results ==
Below are the results from the three parish and town councils that had contested elections. There were uncontested elections to several other parish councils in the district, but given these parish councillors were not elected via a vote, they have been omitted from this list.

=== Buckhurst Hill Parish ===
Overall parish results
Party	Vote	%	±	Seats before	Seats after	±
Conservative	4,942	48.7	▼11.6	5	5	Steady
Green	3,185	31.3	▼8.4	6	5	▼1
EFIG	1,544	15.2	N/A	0	0	Steady
Independent	476	4.6	N/A	0	1	▲1
Turnout	10,147			11	11	

==== Buckhurst Hill East ====
Party	Vote	%	±	Seats before	Seats after	±
Green	2,631	69.1	▲7.1	5	4	▼1
Conservative	702	18.4	▼19.6	0	0	Steady
Independent	476	12.5	N/A	0	1	▲1
Turnout	1,197	35.0				
Electorate	5,198					

==== Buckhurst Hill West ====
Party	Vote	%	±	Seats before	Seats after	±
Conservative	4,240	61.0	▼8.0	5	5	Steady
EFIG	1,544	22.0	N/A	0	0	Steady
Green	1,184	17.0	▼3.0	1	1	Steady
Turnout	1,754	34.0				
Electorate	5,319					

=== Chigwell Parish ===
Overall parish results
Party	Vote	%	±	Seats before	Seats after	±
Conservative	5,486	57.5	▼31.5	11	5	▼6
EFIG	3,570	37.4	N/A	0	6	▲6
Green	473	4.9	N/A	0	0	Steady
Turnout	9,529			11	11	

==== Chigwell Row ====
Party	Vote	%	±	Seats before	Seats after	±
EFIG	N/A		—	0	2	▲2
Conservative	N/A		—	2	0	▼2
Turnout	N/A	N/A				
Electorate	N/A					

==== Chigwell Village ====
Party	Vote	%	±	Seats before	Seats after	±
Conservative	981	66.0	▼23.0	4	2	▼2
EFIG	489	34.0	N/A	0	0	Steady
Turnout	1,470	36.0				
Electorate	2,360					

==== Grange Hill ====
Party	Vote	%	±	Seats before	Seats after	±
Conservative	4,505	55.9	N/A	5	3	▼2
EFIG	3,081	38.3	N/A	0	4	▲4
Green	473	5.9	N/A	0	0	Steady
Turnout	8,059	30.0				
Electorate	6,142					

=== Loughton Town ===
Overall town results
Party	Vote	%	±	Seats before	Seats after	±
LRA	14,481	88.6	▲4.6	21	21	Steady
Conservative	1,371	8.3	▼2.8	0	0	Steady
Independent	359	2.1	▼3.3	1	1	Steady
EFIG	125	0.7	N/A	0	0	Steady
Turnout	16,336			22	22	

==== Loughton Alderton ====
Party	Vote	%	±	Seats before	Seats after	±
LRA	1,746	87.3	▲6.0	3	3	Steady
Conservative	129	6.5	▼3.0	0	0	Steady
EFIG	125	6.3	▲5.3	0	0	Steady
Turnout	2,000	25.0				
Electorate	3,267					

==== Loughton Broadway ====
Party	Vote	%	±	Seats before	Seats after	±
LRA	284	83.8	▲6.0	3	2	▼1
Conservative	55	16.2	▲6.5	0	0	Steady
Turnout	339	22.0				
Electorate	939					

==== Loughton Debden ====
Party	Vote	%	±	Seats before	Seats after	±
LRA	414	77.0	N/A	N/A	1	▲1
Conservative	125	23.0	N/A	N/A	0	Steady
Turnout	539	23.0				
Electorate	2,414					

==== Loughton Fairmead ====
Party	Vote	%	±	Seats before	Seats after	±
LRA	1,787	94.1	▲1.8	3	3	Steady
Conservative	112	5.9	▼1.8	0	0	Steady
Turnout	1,899	25.0				
Electorate	3,139					

==== Loughton Forest ====
Party	Vote	%	±	Seats before	Seats after	±
LRA	2,465	88.8	▲10.9	3	3	Steady
Conservative	311	11.2	▼5.7	0	0	Steady
Turnout	2,776	34.0				
Electorate	3,347					

==== Loughton Roding ====
Party	Vote	%	±	Seats before	Seats after	±
Independent	359	94.0	▲61.3	1	1	Steady
Conservative	24	6.0	▼0.8	0	0	Steady
LRA	N/A		N/A	3	0	▼3
Turnout	383	35.0				
Electorate	1,159					

==== Loughton St. John's ====
Party	Vote	%	±	Seats before	Seats after	±
LRA	5,617	94.1	▲6.3	3	5	▲2
Conservative	350	5.9	▼2.6	0	0	Steady
Turnout	5,967	30.0				
Electorate	5,363					

==== Loughton St. Mary's ====
Party	Vote	%	±	Seats before	Seats after	±
LRA	1,080	88.5	▲5.8	3	2	▼1
Conservative	141	11.5	▲3.5	0	0	Steady
Turnout	1,221	35.0				
Electorate	1,948					

==== Loughton Whitebridge ====
Party	Vote	%	±	Seats before	Seats after	±
LRA	1,088	89.8	N/A	N/A	2	▲2
Conservative	124	10.2	N/A	N/A	0	Steady
Turnout	1,212	30.0				
Electorate	2,363					
