= 2026 Epping Forest District Council election =

Local election in Epping Forest, England

- 7 May 2026

18 seats to Epping Forest District Council 28 seats needed for a majority
- Registered: 100,065
- Turnout: 45,840; 45.8%
	First party	Second party	Third party
Leader	Chris Whitbread	Jaymey McIvor	Chris Pond
Party	Conservative	Reform	Loughton Residents
Leader's seat	Roydon & Lower Nazeing	Ongar	Loughton St. John's
Last election	29 seats, 38.2%	0 seats, 0.7%	13 seats, 17.0%
Seats before	26	1	13
Seats after	19	12	12
Seat change	▼10	▲12	▼1
Popular vote	11,980	18,522	3,686
Percentage	26.1%	40.5%	8.0%
Swing	▼12.1%	▲39.8%	▼9.0%
	Fourth party	Fifth party	Sixth party
Leader	Jon Whitehouse	None	Martin Morris
Party	Liberal Democrats	Independent inc. EFIG	Labour
Leader's seat	Epping East	N/A	Waltham Abbey North
Last election	7 seats, 15.7%	3 seats, 11.1%	1 seat, 22.5%
Seats before	7	5 (Note: EFIG - Cllr Tom Bromwich (North Weald Bassett), Cllr Maria Markham (Waltham Abbey South and Rural), Cllr Lisa Morgan (Grange Hill), Cllr Shane Yerrell (Waltham Abbey West); Loughton Independent - Cllr Stephen Murray (Loughton Roding))	1
Seats after	6	4 (Note: EFIG - Cllr Tom Bromwich (North Weald Bassett), Cllr Maria Markham (Waltham Abbey South and Rural), Cllr Lisa Morgan (Grange Hill); Loughton Independent - Cllr Stephen Murray (Loughton Roding))	1
Seat change	▼1	▲1	Steady
Popular vote	4,089	1,424	3,279
Percentage	8.5%	4.5%	7.1%
Swing	▼7.2%	▼6.6%	▼15.4%
	Seventh party
Leader	Elizabeth Gabbett (Defeated)
Party	Green
Leader's seat	Buckhurst Hill East
Last election	1 seat, 4.1%
Seats before	1
Seats after	0
Seat change	▼1
Popular vote	2,442
Percentage	5.2%
Swing	▲1.1%
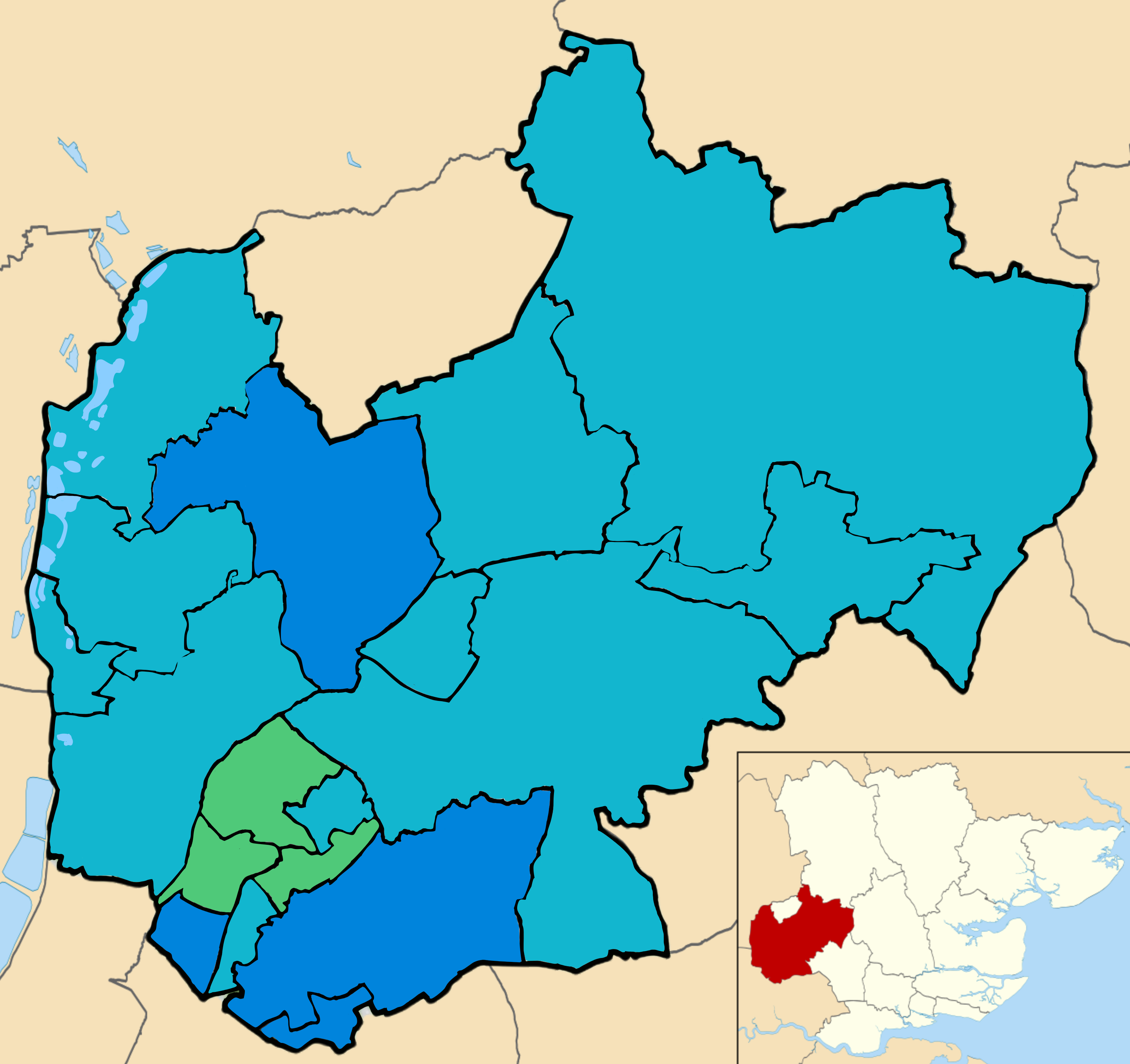
- Election results by ward

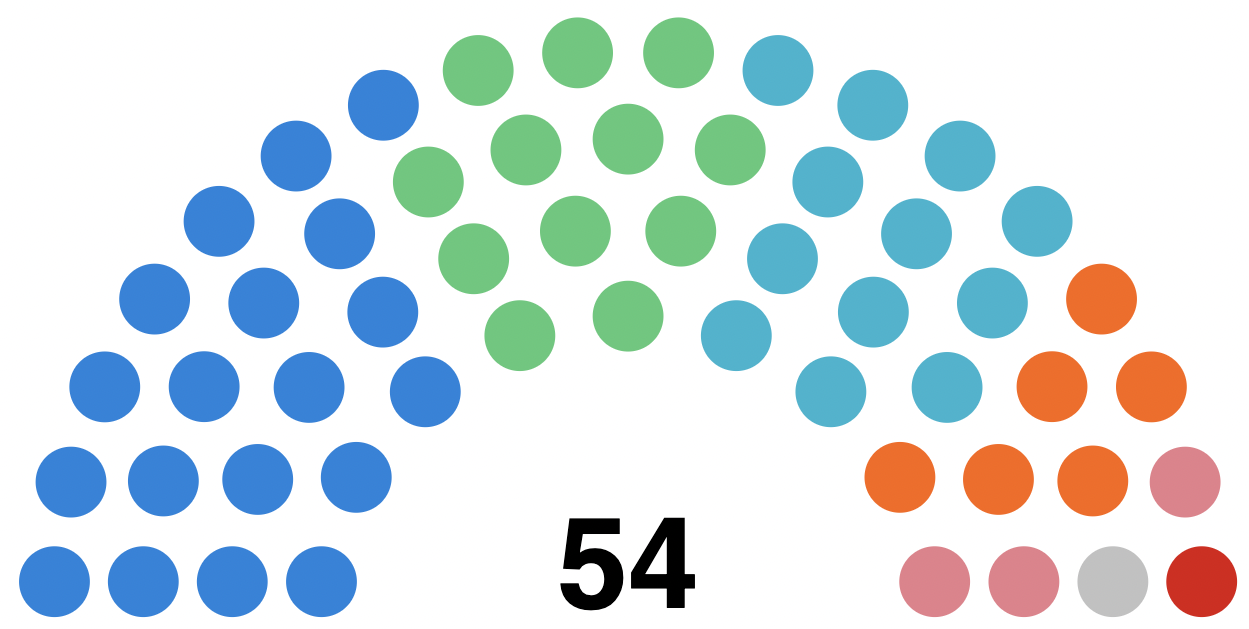
- Council composition after the election
Leader before election
Chris Whitbread
Conservative
No overall control
Leader after election
Chris Whitbread
Conservative
No overall control

The 2026 Epping Forest District Council election was held on Thursday 7 May 2026, as part of the 2026 United Kingdom local elections. Eighteen of Epping Forest District Council's 54 seats were contested.

The council was under no overall control prior to the election, being run by a Conservative minority administration, led by Chris Whitbread. Reform UK won 12 of the 18 seats contested at this election, but the council remained under no overall control and the Conservatives remained the largest party on the council. At the subsequent annual council meeting on 28 May 2026 there was a vote of no confidence in Chris Whitbread's leadership, but it was defeated. As such, the Conservative minority administration continued.

== Background ==
The 2026 Epping Forest District Council election was held on 7 May 2026, following a period of unprecedented turmoil that has shaken the foundations of local politics in the district.

In 2025, Epping saw protests and riots erupt over the Government’s use of the Bell Hotel to house asylum seekers. Demonstrations regularly descended into confrontation, as local residents, anti-fascist campaigners, and far-right activists clashed in scenes unseen in the town for generations. The unrest intensified after the sexual assault of a woman and a schoolgirl by a resident of the hotel, whose conviction and sentencing in September 2025 ignited further anger and polarised opinion across the district.

In response, the Conservative administration on the council took the unprecedented step of launching a legal challenge against the Home Office, securing a temporary High Court injunction in August 2025 to halt the placement of asylum seekers in the Bell Hotel. That victory proved fleeting: the ruling was overturned at the Court of Appeal, and the case now stands before the Supreme Court, due for a final judgment in October 2026.

The crisis has fractured the Conservatives themselves. After months of mounting criticism over their handling of the Bell Hotel unrest, the group lost its majority for the first time since 2006, when two councillors resigned to join the Independents. As a result, the Conservatives will enter the 2026 election defending a fragile minority administration, their dominance of the council for nearly two decades under unprecedented threat.

From December 2025 until mid-January, questions surrounded whether the 2026 district elections would proceed as scheduled. In December, the Government invited 63 councils, including Epping Forest, to request a one-year postponement of elections in light of ongoing plans for local government reorganisation, which would replace district, borough and county councils with larger unitary authorities. Following a meeting of the four political group leaders, Epping Forest District Council decided not to seek a delay. As a result, a proposed extraordinary council meeting—at which councillors could have voted on postponement—was cancelled, and the council formally confirmed that the elections would go ahead on 7 May 2026. Council leaders acknowledged concerns that holding elections could delay reorganisation but stated that maintaining democratic accountability took precedence. The decision was publicly welcomed by opposition councillors and the district’s Member of Parliament, Dr Neil Hudson, who argued that residents should retain the right to vote despite the wider structural uncertainty.

These local elections resulted in a historic realignment of Epping Forest District Council, as the incumbent Conservative administration officially lost overall control of the authority for the first time since 2006.

Reform UK emerged as the primary beneficiaries of the election, capturing 11 of the 18 seats contested on the night. This surged their total representation to 12 seats, positioning them as the joint official opposition alongside the Loughton Residents Association (LRA) immediately following the count. Concurrently, the Conservative Party suffered its worst electoral performance in the district for 27 years, seeing its total number of councillors reduced to 19. The election saw several high-profile defensive failures for the Conservatives, with multiple cabinet members losing their seats including Paul Keska and Tim Matthews, with a Planning Committee Chairman, Sue Jones, also unseated. Former Finance Cabinet Member John Philip also failed in his bid to re-enter the chamber, losing the Rural East ward to Reform UK's Karen McIvor. In one of the few prominent holds for the ruling party, Finance Cabinet Member Holly Whitbread retained her Epping West and Rural seat by a narrow margin of 32 votes in a very tight three-way vote in Epping West and Rural.

The district council results mirrored a widespread shift in the concurrent Essex County Council elections held on the same day. Within the Epping Forest district boundary, Reform UK won six of the seven county divisions. High-profile Conservative casualties at the county level included Council Leader Chris Whitbread, who lost his North Weald and Nazeing county seat to Reform UK, and Holly Whitbread, who lost her Epping and Theydon Bois county seat to Reform UK. Additionally, a boundary change in Loughton North saw veteran LRA county councillor Chris Pond lose to Reform UK. Conservative cabinet member Lee Scott was the sole survivor for his party, retaining Chigwell and Buckhurst Hill East.

Following the declaration of all 18 seats on 8 May 2026, no single political group held an absolute majority in the 54-seat chamber, plunging the council into No Overall Control.

The political composition of the council shifted further in the weeks immediately following the election. On 28 May 2026, LRA councillor Michael Owen resigned from the LRA district group to sit as an independent. This reduction left the LRA with 11 seats, making Reform UK the sole second-largest political group and the official opposition ahead of the annual council meeting.

=== Council composition and changes ===
2024 election		Before 2026 election		After 2026 election	
Party	Seats	Party	Seats	Party	Seats
Conservative	29	Conservative	26	Conservative	19
Loughton Residents	13	Loughton Residents	13	Loughton Residents	12
Reform	0	Reform	1	Reform	12
Liberal Democrats	7	Liberal Democrats	7	Liberal Democrats	6
Epping Forest Independents	2	Epping Forest Independents	2	Epping Forest Independents	3
Independent	1	Independent	3	Independent	1
Labour	1	Labour	1	Labour	1
Green	1	Green	1	Green	0

== Seats up for election ==
=== Council ward ===	Incumbent party	Councillor up for election
Buckhurst Hill East & Whitebridge	Green	Elizabeth Gabbett
Buckhurst Hill West	Conservative	Smruti Patel
Chigwell with Lambourne	Conservative	Darshan Sunger
Epping East	Liberal Democrats	Edward Barnard
Epping West & Rural	Conservative	Holly Whitbread
Grange Hill	Conservative	Rashni Chahal Holden (Not running for re-election)
Loughton Fairmead	Loughton Residents	Arash Ardakani (Not running for re-election)
Loughton Forest	Loughton Residents	Ian Allgood (Not running for re-election)
Loughton Roding	Loughton Residents	Chidi Nweke
Loughton St. John's	Loughton Residents	Graham Wiskin
North Weald Bassett	Conservative	Les Burrows (Not running for re-election)
Ongar	Conservative	Paul Keska
Roydon & Lower Nazeing	Conservative	Ronda Pugsley
Rural East	Conservative	Ian Hadley (Not running for re-election)
Theydon Bois with Passingford	Conservative	Sue Jones
Waltham Abbey North	Conservative	David Stocker (Not running for re-election)
Waltham Abbey South & Rural	Conservative	Tim Matthews
Waltham Abbey West	Independent	Shane Yerrell (Not running for re-election)

== Summary ==
=== Election result ===
2026 Epping Forest District Council election
Party	Candidates	Seats	Gains	Losses	Net gain/loss	Seats %	Votes %	Votes	+/−
Conservative	18	19	0	10	▼10	35.1	26.3	11,980	▼11.9
Loughton Residents	4	12	0	1	▼1	22.2	8.1	3,686	▼8.9
Reform	18	12	11	0	▲11	22.2	40.7	18,522	▲30.0
Liberal Democrats	13	6	0	1	▼1	11.1	9.0	4,089	▼6.7
Epping Forest Independents	6	3	1 (Note: Seat not gained at the election, but via a councillor crossing the floor in 2025 from the Conservatives.)	0	▲1	5.5	2.8	1,266	▼4.7
Labour	16	1	0	0	Steady	1.8	7.2	3,278	▼15.3
Green	6	0	0	1	▼1	1.8	5.4	2,442	▲1.3
Independent	1	1	0	0	Steady	1.8	0.3	158	▼3.3
English Democrat	1	0	0	0	Steady	0.0	0.2	78	▼0.4
TUSC	1	0	0	0	Steady	0.0	0.0	5	▼0.7

==== By ward ====
Ward	Conservative	Reform UK	Liberal Democrat	LRA	Independent inc. EFIG	Labour	Green	Other
Ward	%	%	%	%	%	%	%	%
Buckhurst Hill East & Whitebridge	19.7	38.0	8.8	–	–	–	33.5	–
Buckhurst Hill West	34.5	30.0	5.7	–	2.0	5.3	22.1	–
Chigwell with Lambourne	51.0	38.5	–	–	–	10.5	–	–
Epping East	18.6	33.7	32.3	–	12.5	2.9	–	–
Epping West & Rural	34.3	33.2	32.5	–	–	–	–	–
Grange Hill	32.5	26.0	6.2	–	24.3	11.0	–	–
Loughton Fairmead	6.1	40.2	–	34.6	–	7.1	12.0	–
Loughton Forest	15.8	25.6	2.3	44.0	–	4.0	7.7	0.0
Loughton Roding	8.8	35.0	2.8	35.8	–	5.6	12.0	–
Loughton St. John's	12.8	34.6	2.3	37.7	–	8.2	8.2	–
North Weald Bassett	30.0	49.4	13.0	–	–	7.7	–	–
Ongar	22.3	57.3	5.6	–	9.0	5.9	–	–
Roydon & Lower Nazeing	37.4	47.3	–	–	–	15.5	–	–
Rural East	33.8	51.0	–	–	–	12.6	–	2.5
Theydon Bois with Passingford	30.7	44.8	19.6	–	2.2	2.7	–	–
Waltham Abbey North	22.6	52.8	–	–	8.2	16.4	–	–
Waltham Abbey South & Rural	29.4	50.2	10.5	–	–	9.7	–	–
Waltham Abbey West	28.2	46.8	10.5	–	–	14.5	–	–

== Close seats ==
Seats won with winning margins under 5.0%.

1. Loughton Roding, 0.8% (20 votes)
2. Epping West & Rural, 1.1% (32 votes)
3. Epping East, 1.4% (43 votes)
4. Loughton St. John's, 3.1% (82 votes)
5. Buckhurst Hill West, 4.4% (116 votes)
6. Buckhurst Hill East & Whitebridge, 4.5% (128 votes)

== Ward results ==
Buckhurst Hill East & Whitebridge
Party	Candidate	Votes	%	±%
Reform	James Small	1,060	38.0	N/A
Green	Elizabeth Gabbett	932	33.5	Steady
Conservative	Joanna Farmer	547	19.7	▲3.8
Liberal Democrats	Naomi Davies	244	8.8	N/A
Majority		128	4.5	N/A
Turnout		2,783	48.0	▲15.0
Registered electors				
Reform gain from Green		Swing		

Buckhurst Hill West
Party	Candidate	Votes	%	±%
Conservative	Smruti Patel*	891	34.5	▲1.6
Reform	Yvonne Hrusa	775	30.0	N/A
Green	Dewole Aradeon	572	22.1	▼1.3
Liberal Democrats	Ish Singh	149	5.7	▼7.6
Labour	Alain Laviolette	139	5.3	▼11.5
EFIG	Ceejay Ubah	53	2.0	▼11.7
Majority		116	4.4	
Turnout		2,579	50.0	▲16.0
Registered electors				
Conservative hold		Swing		

Chigwell with Lambourne
Party	Candidate	Votes	%	±%
Conservative	Darshan Sunger*	1,366	51.0	▼5.6
Reform	Kieran Emery	1,030	38.5	N/A
Labour	Tony Casaluci	279	10.5	▼10.7
Majority		336	12.5	
Turnout		2,675	35.0	▲3.0
Registered electors				
Conservative hold		Swing		

Epping East
Party	Candidate	Votes	%	±%
Reform	Karen Batley	1,007	33.7	N/A
Liberal Democrats	Edward Barnard*	964	32.3	▼12.4
Conservative	Ian Roberts	557	18.6	▼1.7
EFIG	Cherry McCredie	364	12.5	N/A
Labour	James Murchison	88	2.9	▼7.7
Majority		43	1.4	N/A
Turnout		2,980	54.0	▲19.0
Registered electors				
Reform gain from Liberal Democrats		Swing		

Epping West & Rural
Party	Candidate	Votes	%	±%
Conservative	Holly Whitbread*	986	34.3	▼1.8
Reform	Andrew Smith	954	33.2	N/A
Liberal Democrats	Alex Frost	929	32.5	▼8.5
Majority		32	1.1	▲0.2
Turnout		2,024	55.0	▲16.0
Registered electors				
Conservative hold		Swing		

Grange Hill
Party	Candidate	Votes	%	±%
Conservative	Jamie Braha	727	32.5	▼3.1
Reform	Yair Cohen	580	26.0	N/A
EFIG	Erika Skingsley	379	17.3	▼17.5
Labour	Syed Sadaf	247	11.0	▼9.5
Independent	Debbie Rye	158	7.0	N/A
Liberal Democrats	Richard Griffiths	140	6.2	▼2.9
Majority		147	6.5	
Turnout		2,231	36.0	▲5.0
Registered electors				
Conservative hold		Swing		

Loughton Fairmead
Party	Candidate	Votes	%	±%
Reform	Natalie Wilding-Barrett	837	40.2	N/A
Loughton Residents	David Wixley	721	34.6	▼29.3
Green	Joseph Downie	246	12.0	N/A
Labour	Tom Ayre	148	7.1	▼4.9
Conservative	Shivaje Karari	129	6.1	▼8.0
Majority		116	5.5	N/A
Turnout		2,081	38.0	▲14.0
Registered electors				
Reform gain from Loughton Residents		Swing		

Loughton Forest
Party	Candidate	Votes	%	±%
Loughton Residents	Richard Cohen	1,173	44.0	▼13.9
Reform	Jon Bryan	685	25.6	N/A
Conservative	Mari-Louise Whitbread	424	15.8	▼1.3
Green	Hannah Lovell	208	7.7	N/A
Labour	Elizabeth Marsh	109	4.0	▼9.2
Liberal Democrats	Glenn Hernandez	64	2.3	▼6.1
TUSC	Scott Jones	5	0.0	▼0.5
Majority		488	18.2	
Turnout		2,668	50.0	▲15.0
Registered electors				
Loughton Residents hold		Swing		

Loughton Roding
Party	Candidate	Votes	%	±%
Loughton Residents	Chidi Nweke*	806	35.8	▲1.1
Reform	Neil Carlsson	786	35.0	N/A
Green	Chris Hill	269	12.0	N/A
Conservative	Manraj Atwal	198	8.8	▲3.3
Labour	Debbie Wild	127	5.6	▼8.1
Liberal Democrats	Peter Sinfield	63	2.8	N/A
Majority		20	0.8	N/A
Turnout		2,249	39.0	▲12.0
Registered electors				
Loughton Residents hold		Swing		

Loughton St. John's
Party	Candidate	Votes	%	±%
Loughton Residents	Graham Wiskin	986	37.7	▼27.8
Reform	Adam Riches	904	34.6	N/A
Conservative	David Saunders	336	12.8	▼6.9
Green	Joe Fellows	215	8.2	N/A
Labour	Alastair Smith	108	8.2	▼12.3
Liberal Democrats	Ralph Cox	62	2.3	N/A
Majority		82	3.1	
Turnout		2,611	48.0	▲18.0
Registered electors				
Loughton Residents hold		Swing		

North Weald Bassett
Party	Candidate	Votes	%	±%
Reform	Jay Gupta	1,209	49.4	N/A
Conservative	Andy Irvine	731	30.0	▼2.0
Liberal Democrats	Tom Addenbrooke	316	13.0	N/A
Labour	Ann Huish	188	7.7	▼13.1
Majority		478	19.4	N/A
Turnout		2,445	49.0	▲18.0
Registered electors				
Reform gain from Conservative		Swing		

Ongar
Party	Candidate	Votes	%	±%
Reform	Annie O'Neill	1,652	57.3	N/A
Conservative	Paul Keska*	642	22.3	▼38.4
EFIG	Tony Sweetman	250	9.0	N/A
Labour	Ron Huish	171	5.9	16.6
Liberal Democrats	Monica Richardson	164	5.6	▼11.2
Majority		1,010	35.0	N/A
Turnout		2,879	50.0	▲23.0
Registered electors				
Reform gain from Conservative		Swing		

Roydon & Lower Nazeing
Party	Candidate	Votes	%	±%
Reform	Phil Dawkins	1,118	47.3	N/A
Conservative	Ronda Pugsley	880	37.4	▼18.2
Labour	Alex Drummond	364	15.5	▼14.1
Majority		238	9.9	N/A
Turnout		2,362	43.0	▲17.0
Registered electors				
Reform gain from Conservative		Swing		

Rural East
Party	Candidate	Votes	%	±%
Reform	Karen McIvor	1,559	51.0	▲37.9
Conservative	John Philip	1,035	33.8	▲0.7
Labour	Dale Walker	388	12.6	▼3.8
English Democrat	Robin Tilbrook	78	2.5	▼6.7
Majority		524	17.1	N/A
Turnout		3,060	49.0	▲19.0
Registered electors				
Reform gain from Conservative		Swing		

Theydon Bois with Passingford
Party	Candidate	Votes	%	±%
Reform	Geoff Shaw	1,249	44.8	N/A
Conservative	Sue Jones	856	30.7	▼3.9
Liberal Democrats	Rahim Hussein	548	19.6	▼27.5
Labour	Christine Mortimer	76	2.7	▼5.1
EFIG	William Ayrton	58	2.2	N/A
Majority		393	14.1	N/A
Turnout		2,787	54.0	▲18.0
Registered electors				
Reform gain from Conservative		Swing		

Waltham Abbey North
Party	Candidate	Votes	%	±%
Reform	Paul Kelleher	1,060	52.8	N/A
Conservative	Andrew Crowley	454	22.6	▼10.1
Labour	Kevin Hind	329	16.4	▼18.8
EFIG	Amber Badyari	162	8.2	N/A
Majority		606	30.2	N/A
Turnout		2,005	38.0	▲14.0
Registered electors				
Reform gain from Conservative		Swing		

Waltham Abbey South & Rural
Party	Candidate	Votes	%	±%
Reform	James Abbott	1,038	50.2	N/A
Conservative	Tim Matthews*	607	29.4	▼29.3
Liberal Democrats	Paul Tippett	218	10.5	N/A
Labour	Sean Voitov	201	9.7	▼31.6
Majority		431	20.8	N/A
Turnout		2,064	38.0	▲14.0
Registered electors				
Reform gain from Conservative		Swing		

Waltham Abbey West
Party	Candidate	Votes	%	±%
Reform	Josh Webb	1,019	46.8	N/A
Conservative	Fraser Scott	614	28.2	▼27.3
Labour	Angela Ayre	316	14.5	▼30.0
Liberal Democrats	Paul Ward	228	10.5	N/A
Majority		405	18.6	N/A
Turnout		2,177	39.0	▲16.0
Registered electors				
Reform gain from Conservative		Swing		

== By-elections (district and parish) ==
Below are by-elections that took place from the local elections in 2024 at both district level, and parish council level, including town councils.

=== Grange Hill ===
Below is the breakdown of the results from the 2024 parish council election to the Grange Hill ward on Chigwell Parish Council - the boundaries of which mirror those at the district level. The below table is for comparison with the Grange Hill by-election result.

2024 parish election results - Grange Hill ward
Party	Vote	%	Seats before	Seats after	±
Conservative	4,505	55.9	5	3	▼2
EFIG	3,081	38.3	0	4	▲4
Green	473	6.0	0	0	Steady
Turnout	1,852	30.0			
Electorate	6,142				

Grange Hill (Chigwell Parish Council): 6 November 2025
Party	Candidate	Votes	%	±%
EFIG	Erika Skingsley	357	57.4	▲19.2
Conservative	Shivaje Singh Karari	265	42.6	▼13.3
Majority		92	14.7	
Turnout		622	10.0	
EFIG gain from Independent				

Change in vote share is based on the ward-wide results achieved at the 2024 parish council election.

=== Buckhurst Hill West ===
Below is the breakdown of the results from the 2024 parish council election to the Buckhurst Hill West ward - the boundaries of which mirror those at the district level. The below table is for comparison with the Buckhurst Hill West by-election result.

2024 parish election result - Buckhurst Hill West ward
Party	Vote	%	Seatsbefore	Seatsafter	±
Conservative	4,340	61.4	5	5	Steady
Green	1,657	23.5	1	1	Steady
EFIG	1,071	15.1	0	0	Steady
Turnout	1,754	34.0			
Electorate	5,198				

2025 parish by-election result - Buckhurst Hill West ward
Party	Vote	%	±%	Seatsbefore	Seatsafter	±
Reform UK	976	33.4	N/A	0	2	▲2
Conservative	768	26.2	▼25.0	5	3	▼2
Green	682	23.3	▼0.2	1	1	Steady
EFIG / Independent	320	11.0	N/A	0	0	Steady
Liberal Democrat	180	6.2	N/A	0	0	Steady
Turnout	1,516	29.0				
Electorate	5,196					

Buckhurst Hill West (Buckhurst Hill Parish Council): 16 October 2025
Party	Candidate	Votes	%	±%
Reform	Kieran Emery	493	33.4	N/A
Reform	Natalie Wilding Barrett	483		
Conservative	Colette Fox	417	26.2	▼25.0
Green	Kathryn Radley	355	23.3	▼0.2
Conservative	Selina Seesunkur	351		
Green	Joanna Garbaty	327		
Independent	Casta Littlewood	187	11.0	N/A
Liberal Democrats	Rahim Hussein	180	6.2	N/A
EFIG	Lyubka Mihailova	70		
EFIG	Malachi Fontenelle	60		
Majority				
Turnout		1,516	29.0	
Reform gain from Conservative		Swing		
Reform gain from Conservative		Swing		

=== Shelley ===
Shelley (Ongar Town Council): 22 May 2025
Party	Candidate	Votes	%	±%
Reform	James Regan	352	77.8	N/A
Labour	Alison Wingfield	100	22.2	N/A
Majority		252	55.6	N/A
Turnout		452		
Reform gain from Labour		Swing	0.0	
