= Robin Tilbrook =

English solicitor and political leader (born 1958)

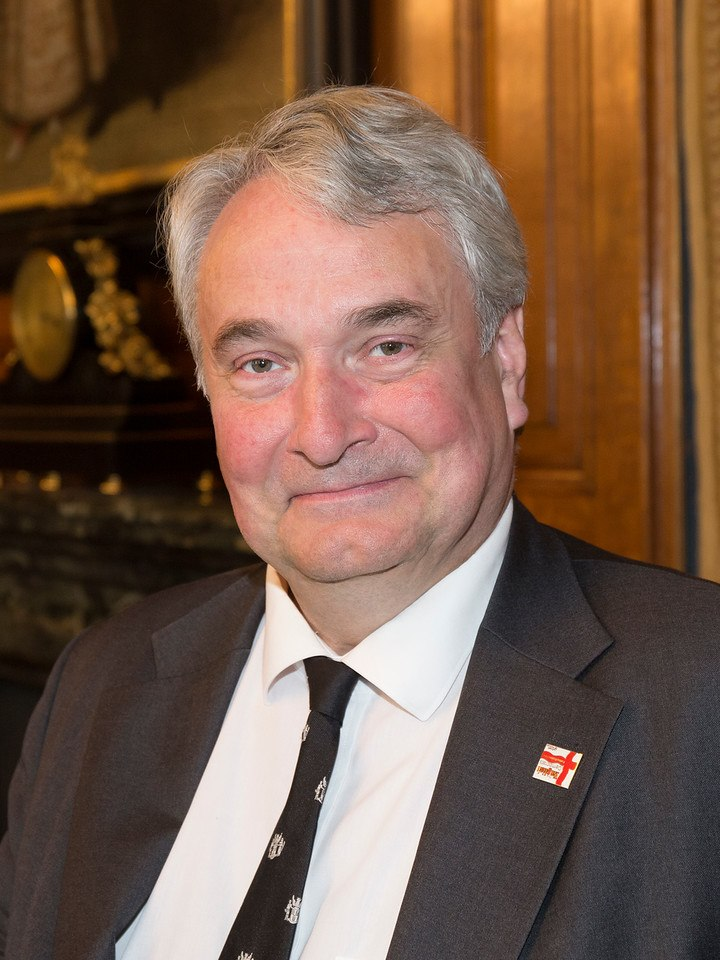
- Tilbrook in 2017

Chairman of the English Democrats
- Incumbent
- Assumed office 17 September 2002
- Preceded by: Office established

Personal details
- Born: Robin Charles William Tilbrook; 8 April 1958 (age 68) Kuala Lumpur, Federation of Malaya
- Party: English Democrats (since 2002)
- Other political affiliations: Conservative (before 1997)
- Spouse: Claire Breed (m. 1988)
- Children: 3
- Education: University of Kent (BA)

Robin Charles William Tilbrook (born 8 April 1958) is an English politician and solicitor who has been chairman of the English Democrats since its foundation in 2002 and chairman of the Workers of England Union.

== Early life ==
Tilbrook was born in Kuala Lumpur, Federation of Malaya, in 1958. He was educated at Wellington College, Berkshire, gained a BA (Hons) in politics and economics from the University of Kent at Canterbury, and then studied at The College of Law, Chester.

He was a Coldstream Guardsman and has worked in a factory, in junior management, and as a teacher at primary and secondary level. By 2003, he was a solicitor and a partner in the firm of Tilbrooks in Ongar, Essex. In 2005, he commented after a case, "It is a black day in the courts when they refuse to make a declaration that St George's Day is a special occasion."

On 27 September 2011, he became a Freeman of the City of London.

== Political career ==
Tilbrook was a member of the Conservative Student Association and a member of the Conservative Party, at one time a Conservative candidate for Ongar Town council.

He co-founded the English National Party in 1997, and then helped to relaunch the party as the English Democrats in 2002 to campaign for an English Parliament. He is also the leader and nominating officer. He has stood as a candidate for the English Democrats in local, parliamentary and European elections. Standing in Epping Forest, he received 1.4% of the vote in the 2005 general election, 4.4% at 2005 Essex County Council election, 18.2% in the 2007 Epping Forest District Council election, and 11.3% in the 2009 County Council election. He gained 2.01% of the vote as the lead candidate for the East of England region in the 2009 European election.

By 2006, the English Democrats, based in Norwich and chaired by Tilbrook, had adopted the policies of campaigning for a devolved English parliament, opposing membership of the European Union, opposing further immigration, and wishing to make St George's Day a national holiday.

Tilbrook said of the English Democrats in 2006 that the party "agitates for anyone living in England" and that Englishness was "akin to American notions of "Americanness": that you can be from any ethnic background and still wrap yourself in the flag." In the same year, he criticised spending on St Patrick's Day in London and added that too little was spent on St George's Day. In 2009, he said, "We're hoping to do what the Scottish National Party managed to do in the 1970s and break through to being able to influence what happens in Parliament about England". He argues that the money given by the UK to the EU is given to other parts of the country at the expense of England, which makes his party Eurosceptic.

Tilbrook has reportedly had associations with the British far-right. In 2013, he confirmed that a tenth of the English Democrats membership was former BNP members and stood by comments at the party's 10th annual conference in 2011 that BNP supporters will "help us become an electorally credible party". In a 2015 interview with the BBC, Tilbrook confirmed that he had had meetings with groups on the far-right and far-left. This meeting was reportedly organised by the then leader of Britain First, Jim Dowson, and attended by members of the English Defence League. In 2023, it was reported that activists from Patriotic Alternative, a neo-Nazi party, had canvassed for him in the Epping Forest District Council elections.

Tilbrook has adopted a pro-Brexit stance, claiming that the United Kingdom had left the European Union on 29 March 2019. He reasoned that Theresa May had the authority to begin Britain's two-year withdrawal process from the European Union, but did not have the power to amend it, meaning that the extension granted by Brussels until 31 October 2019 was unlawful. The case, however, was rejected for a hearing on the grounds of lack of legal merit and cannot lead to a conclusion that the UK left the EU on 29 March 2019, but has been appealed to the European Court of Human Rights in Strasbourg.

=== Elections contested ===
==== UK Parliament elections ====
Date of election	Constituency	Party	Votes	%	Result
2005	Epping Forest	English Democrat	631	1.4	Not elected (6th)
2010	Brentwood and Ongar	English Democrat	491	1.0	Not elected (7th)
2015	Brentwood and Ongar	English Democrat	173	0.3	Not elected (6th)
2017	Clacton	English Democrat	289	0.7	Not elected (7th)
2019	Brentwood and Ongar	English Democrat	532	1.0	Not elected (5th)
2024	Brentwood and Ongar	English Democrat	189	0.4	Not elected (6th)

==== European Parliament elections ====
Date of election	Constituency	List		Votes	%	Result
2004	London	English Democrat	1st	15,945	0.9	Not elected
2009	East of England	English Democrat	1st	32,211	2.0	Not elected
2014	East of England	English Democrat	1st	16,497	1.1	Not elected
2019	East of England	English Democrat	1st	10,217	0.6	Not elected

==== Welsh Assembly elections ====
Date of election	Constituency	List		Votes	%	Result
2011	South Wales East	English Democrat	3rd	1,904	1.1	Not elected

==== Police and Crime Commissioner ====
Date of election	Police force	Party	Votes	%	Result
2012	Essex	English Democrat	11,550	6.9	Not elected (6th)
2021	Essex	English Democrat	42,831	9.8	Not elected (4th)
2024	Essex	English Democrat	44,909	13.2	Not elected (4th)

==== Essex County Council elections ====
Date of election	Division	Party	Votes	%	Result
2004 by-election	Little Parndon and Town Centre	English Democrat	21	0.8	Not elected (6th)
2005	Epping and Theydon Bois	English Democrat	368	4.4	Not elected (4th)
2009	Ongar & Rural	English Democrat	505	11.3	Not elected (3rd)
2013	Ongar & Rural	English Democrat	93	3.2	Not elected (6th)
2017	Ongar & Rural	English Democrat	58	1.7	Not elected (5th)
2021	Ongar & Rural	English Democrat	186	4.8	Not elected (5th)
2026	Ongar & Rural	English Democrat	89	1.3	Not elected (5th)

==== Epping Forest District Council elections ====
Date of election	Ward	Party	Votes	%	Result
2004	Moreton and Fyfield	English Democrat	116	14.1	Not elected (3rd)
2006	Chipping Ongar, Greensted and Marden Ash	English Democrat	250	16.6	Not elected (3rd)
2007	Chipping Ongar, Greensted and Marden Ash	English Democrat	233	18.2	Not elected (3rd)
2008	High Ongar, Willingale and The Rodings	English Democrat	61	10.0	Not elected (2nd)
2010	Chipping Ongar, Greensted and Marden Ash	English Democrat	220	8.0	Not elected (5th)
2011	Chipping Ongar, Greensted and Marden Ash	English Democrat	148	9.5	Not elected (4th)
2012	High Ongar, Willingale and the Rodings	English Democrat	63	12.8	Not elected (2nd)
2014	Chipping Ongar, Greensted & Marden Ash	English Democrat	36	2.5	Not elected (5th)
2016	High Ongar, Willingale and the Rodings	English Democrat	34	7.5	Not elected (3rd)
2019	Chipping Ongar, Greensted and Marden Ash	English Democrat	166	17.2	Not elected (3rd)
2021	High Ongar, Willingale and the Rodings	English Democrat	43	6.5	Not elected (4th)
2022	Chipping Ongar, Greensted and Marden Ash	English Democrat	72	7.5	Not elected (4th)
2023	Shelley	English Democrat	34	10.3	Not elected (3rd)
2024	Rural East	English Democrat	227	9.2	Not elected (5th)
2026	Rural East	English Democrat	78	2.5	Not elected (4th)

== Personal life ==
Tilbrook is the elder son of the late Brigadier Thomas William Tilbrook, Queen's Royal Irish Hussars, by his marriage to Jacqueline Mackillican. In 1988, Tilbrook became engaged to Claire Breed. They married and had three children. He is a member of the Church of England.

== See also ==
- Peter Davies (politician)
