= 2015 Epping Forest District Council election =

2015 UK local government election

- 7 May 2015

18 of 58 seats on Epping Forest District Council 30 seats needed for a majority
- Turnout: 62.4% (▲26.4%)
	First party	Second party	Third party
Leader	Chris Whitbread	Caroline Pond	Jon Whitehouse
Party	Conservative	Loughton Residents	Liberal Democrats
Leader's seat	Epping Lindsey & Thornwood Common	Loughton St. John's	Epping Hemnall
Last election	37 seats, 37.3%	12 seats, 16.0%	3 seats, 11.3%
Seats before	36	12	4
Seats won	38	12	3
Seat change	▲1	N/A	Steady
Popular vote	21,814	N/A	3,890
Percentage	62.7%	N/A	11.2%
Swing	▲25.4%	N/A	▼0.1%
	Fourth party	Fifth party	Sixth party
Leader	Rod Butler	Steven Neville	N/A
Party	UKIP	Green	Independent
Leader's seat	Waltham Abbey Honey Lane	Buckhurst Hill East	N/A
Last election	2 seats, 14.4%	1 seats, 7.4%	2 seats, N/A
Seats before	2	1	2
Seats won	2	1	2
Seat change	Steady	Steady	Steady
Popular vote	3,705	1,511	1,050
Percentage	10.6%	4.2%	2.9%
Swing	▼3.8%	▼3.2%	N/A
	Seventh party
Leader	Peter Gode (Outgoing)
Party	Labour
Leader's seat	Shelley
Last election	1 seat, 8.0%
Seats before	1
Seats won	0
Seat change	▼1
Popular vote	3,305
Percentage	9.4%
Swing	▲1.4%
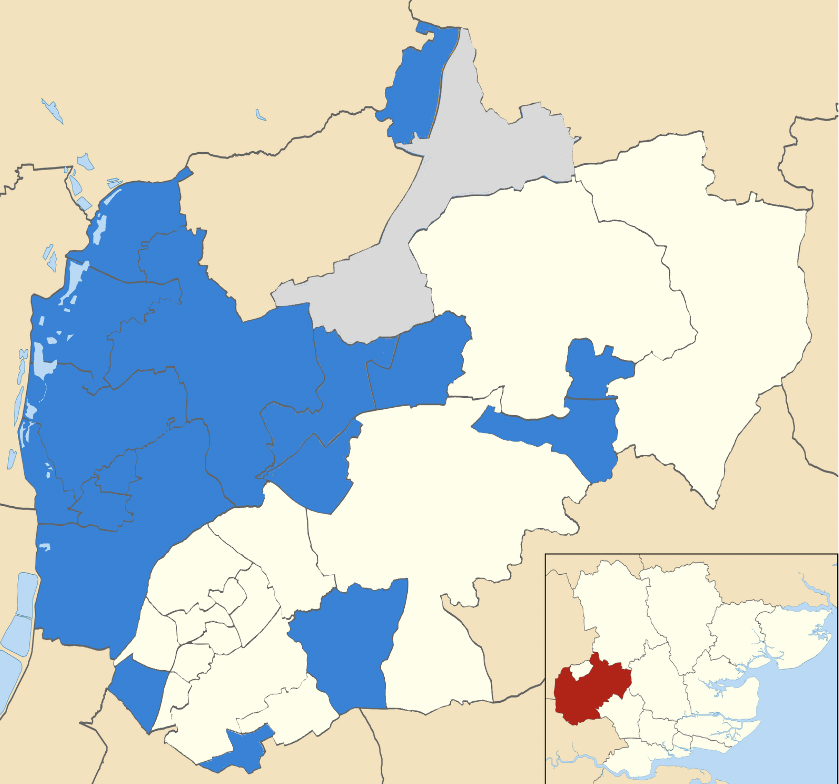
- Results of the 2015 District Council elections

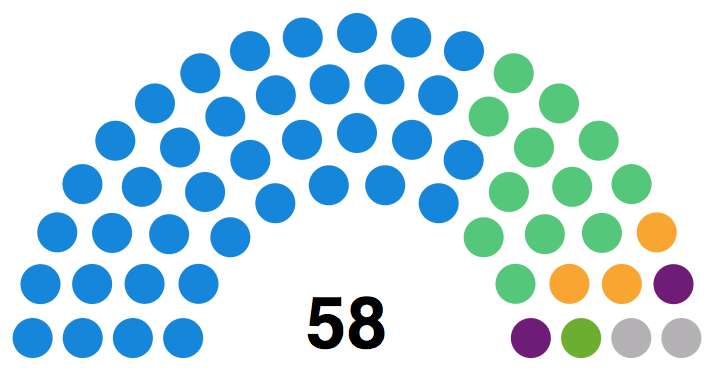
- Council composition following the election
Council control before election
Conservative
Council control after election
Conservative

The 2015 Epping Forest District Council election took place on 7 May 2015 to elect members of Epping Forest District Council in England. This was on the same day as other local elections.

This election marks the last time a Labour councillor sat in the chamber after Peter Gode of Shelley stood down - a dramatic decline following Labour being the largest party in the mid-1990s.

== By-elections ==
=== Epping Hemnall by-election ===
A by-election was held on 25 September 2014 following the death of Mayor Ken Avey. Liberal Democrat, Kim Adams won with 43% of the vote compared to 28% for the Conservative Party and 24% to UKIP. This election reversed this by-election result with Avey's son, Nigel replacing him, ousting the Liberal Democrat councillor

Epping Hemnall (compared to 2011 election)
Party	Candidate	Votes	%	±%
Liberal Democrats	Kim Adams	607	43.3	▲0.9
Conservative	Nigel Avey	386	27.5	▼29.5
UKIP	Andrew Smith	339	24.1	▼1.5
Green	Anna Widdup	69	4.9	▼0.6
Majority		221	15.8	N/A
Turnout		1,401	29.0	
Liberal Democrats gain from Conservative		Swing		

=== Broadley Common, Epping Forest & Nazeing By-election ===
Broadley Common, Epping Forest & Nazeing By-election, 7 Aug 2014
Party	Candidate	Votes	%	±%
Conservative	Robert Glozier	155	50.4	▼33.5
UKIP	Ron McEvoy	122	39.7	N/A
Green	William Hartington	23	7.4	▼2.4
Liberal Democrats	Arnold Verrall	7	2.2	▼3.9
Majority		33	10.7	▼41.2
Turnout		307	18%	
Conservative hold		Swing		

== Ward results ==
Figures are compared to the last time these seats were contested in any election cycle for the Epping Forest District Council election, this is indicated.

=== Broadley Common, Epping Forest & Nazeing ===
Broadley Common, Epping Forest & Nazeing (compared to 2011 election)
Party	Candidate	Votes	%	±%
Conservative	Lynn Hughes	761	65.8	▼18.1
UKIP	Kevin Byford	256	22.1	N/A
Green	Timothy Widdup	77	6.6	▼3.2
Liberal Democrats	Enid Robinson	62	5.3	▼0.8
Majority		505	43.7	▼8.2
Turnout		1,156	67%	
Conservative hold		Swing		

=== Buckhurst Hill West ===
Buckhurst Hill West (compared to 2014 election)
Party	Candidate	Votes	%	±%
Conservative	Aniket Patel	2,450	63.3	▲1.9
Liberal Democrats	Chris Greaves	604	15.6	▲4.8
Labour	Angela Ayre	455	11.8	▲2.2
Green	Roger Neville	363	9.4	▼5.7
Majority		1,846	47.7	▼1.4
Turnout		3,872	72%	▲37.0
Conservative hold		Swing		

=== Chipping Ongar, Greensted & Marden Ash ===
Chipping Ongar, Greensted & Marden Ash (compared to 2011 election)
Party	Candidate	Votes	%	±%
Conservative	Paul Keska	1,268	51.6	▲22.7
UKIP	Llyris Stebbings	553	22.5	▼5.5
Liberal Democrats	Barbara Szymanek	428	17.4	▼12.0
Green	Stephen Delarre	207	8.4	▼1.9
Majority		715	29.1	▲17.8
Turnout		2,456	72%	▲31.0
Conservative hold		Swing		

=== Epping Hemnall ===
Epping Hemnall (compared to 2011 election)
Party	Candidate	Votes	%	±%
Conservative	Nigel Avey	1,368	39.0	▲18.0
Liberal Democrats	Kim Adams	1,131	32.2	▼10.2
UKIP	Barry Johns	532	15.1	▼10.5
Labour	Inez Collier	302	8.6	▲2.6
Green	Anna Widdup	173	4.9	▲0.6
Majority		237	6.8	▲0.6
Turnout		3,506	71%	▲31.0
Conservative gain from Liberal Democrats		Swing		

=== Epping Lindsey & Thornwood Common ===
Epping Lindsey & Thornwood Common (compared to 2014 election)
Party	Candidate	Votes	%	±%
Conservative	Chris Whitbread	2,182	61.7	▲24.2
Liberal Democrats	Ingrid Black	558	15.7	▲1.8
Labour	Simon Bullough	524	14.8	▲2.7
Green	William Hartington	272	7.7	▲1.0
Majority		1,624	46.0	▲38.1
Turnout		3,536	69%	▲31.0
Conservative hold		Swing		

=== Grange Hill ===
Grange Hill (compared to 2014 election)
Party	Candidate	Votes	%	±%
Conservative	Kewal Chana	1,802	55.3	▲0.9
Labour	Isuru Perera	678	20.8	N/A
UKIP	Simon Hearn	584	17.9	N/A
Liberal Democrats	Pesh Kapasiawala	194	5.9	▼15.9
Majority		1,124	34.5	▲3.8
Turnout		3,258	63%	▲33.0
Conservative hold		Swing		

=== Hastingwood, Matching & Sheering Village ===
Hastingwood, Matching & Sheering Village (compared to 2012 election)
Party	Candidate	Votes	%	±%
Independent	Richard Morgan	648	46.1	▼41.3
Conservative	Joanne Share-Bernia	597	42.5	N/A
Labour	Sandra Jenner	160	11.3	N/A
Majority		51	3.6	▼71.2
Turnout		1,405	74%	▲29%
Independent hold		Swing		

=== Lambourne ===
Lambourne (compared to 2011 election)
Party	Candidate	Votes	%	±%
Conservative	Brian Rolfe	706	69.6	▼10.4
UKIP	David Mills	308	30.3	N/A
Majority		398	39.3	▼28.6
Turnout		1,014	68%	▲26.0
Conservative hold		Swing		

=== Lower Nazeing ===
Lower Nazeing (compared to 2014 election)
Party	Candidate	Votes	%	±%
Conservative	Richard Bassett	1,775	81.5	▲12.5
Labour	Kelvin Morris	401	18.4	▲4.3
Majority		1,374	63.1	▲11.0
Turnout		2,176	67%	▲31.0
Conservative hold		Swing		

=== Lower Sheering ===
Lower Sheering (compared to 2011 election)
Party	Candidate	Votes	%	±%
Conservative	Gary Waller	821	69.8	▲13.2
Labour	Laurence Morter	354	30.1	N/A
Majority		467	39.7	▲8.0
Turnout		1,175	69%	▲26.0
Conservative hold		Swing		

=== North Weald Bassett ===
North Weald Bassett (compared to 2014 election)
Party	Candidate	Votes	%	±%
Conservative	Anne Grigg	1,452	59.8	▲1.0
UKIP	Paul Stevens	620	25.5	▼9.1
Liberal Democrats	Arnold Verrall	180	7.4	▲0.9
Green	Nicole Barnecutt	176	7.2	N/A
Majority		832	34.3	▲10.2
Turnout		2,428	66%	▲32.0
Conservative hold		Swing		

=== Roydon ===
Roydon (compared to 2011 election)
Party	Candidate	Votes	%	±%
Conservative	Mary Sartin	1,060	83.3	▲8.0
Labour	Janice Croke	211	16.6	▼3.6
Majority		849	66.7	▲11.7
Turnout		1,271	70%	▲26
Conservative hold		Swing		

=== Shelley ===
Shelley (compared to 2011 election)
Party	Candidate	Votes	%	±%
Conservative	Nigel Bedford	467	48.3	▲4.4
UKIP	Isobel Gould	278	28.8	N/A
Labour	Robert Greyson	220	22.7	▼22.3
Majority		189	20.3	▲19.2
Turnout		965	55%	▲23.0
Conservative gain from Labour		Swing		

=== Waltham Abbey High Beach ===
Waltham Abbey High Beach (compared to 2011 election)
Party	Candidate	Votes	%	±%
Conservative	Sydney-Anne Stavrou	839	67.6	▲10.4
Independent	Paul Morris	402	32.3	N/A
Majority		437	35.3	▲3.9
Turnout		1,241	64%	▲24
Conservative hold		Swing		

=== Waltham Abbey Honey Lane ===
Waltham Abbey Honey Lane (compared to 2011 election)
Party	Candidate	Votes	%	±%
Conservative	Simon Kane	2,002	77.8	▲12.2
Liberal Democrats	Bhupendra Patel	569	22.1	▲14.4
Majority		1,433	55.7	▲9.4
Turnout		2,571	58%	▲27%
Conservative hold		Swing		

=== Waltham Abbey North East ===
Waltham Abbey North East (compared to 2012 election)
Party	Candidate	Votes	%	±%
Conservative	Ann Mitchell	1,427	100%	▲23.6
Majority		1,427	100%	N/A
Turnout		1,427	61%	▲27.0
Conservative hold		Swing		

=== Waltham Abbey Paternoster ===
Waltham Abbey Paternoster (compared to 2011 election)
Party	Candidate	Votes	%	±%
Conservative	Elizabeth Ann Webster	N/A	100%	▲31.0
Majority		N/A	100%	▲31.7
Turnout		N/A	N/A	N/A
Conservative hold		Swing		

=== Waltham Abbey South West ===
Waltham Abbey South West (compared to 2012 election)
Party	Candidate	Votes	%	±%
Conservative	Ricki Gadsby	837	46.0	▼16.0
UKIP	Ron McEnvoy	574	31.5	N/A
Green	Dave Plummer	243	13.3	N/A
Liberal Democrats	Phil Chadburn	164	9.0	▼0.9
Majority		263	14.5	▼21.4
Turnout		1,818	58%	▲39.0
Conservative hold		Swing		
