= 2016 Epping Forest District Council election =

2016 UK local government election

- 5 May 2016

21 of 58 seats on Epping Forest District Council 30 seats needed for a majority
- Turnout: 29.0% (▼29.5%)
	First party	Second party	Third party
Leader	Chris Whitbread	Caroline Pond	Jon Whitehouse
Party	Conservative	Loughton Residents	Liberal Democrats
Leader's seat	Epping Lindsey & Thornwood Common	Loughton St. John's	Epping Hemnall
Last election	38 seats, 62.7%	N/A	3 seats, 11.2%
Seats before	38	12	3
Seats won	37	13	2
Seat change	▼1	▲1	▼1
Popular vote	10,218	6,118	2,348
Percentage	44.4%	26.6%	10.2%
Swing	▼18.3%	N/A	▼1.0%
	Fourth party	Fifth party	Sixth party
Leader	Steven Neville	Rod Butler	N/A
Party	Green	UKIP	Independent
Leader's seat	Buckhurst Hill East	Waltham Abbey Honey Lane	N/A
Last election	1 seat, 4.2%	2 seats, 10.6%	2 seats, 2.9%
Seats before	1	2	2
Seats won	2	2	2
Seat change	▲1	Steady	Steady
Popular vote	2,148	1,093	N/A
Percentage	9.3%	4.7%	N/A
Swing	▲5.1%	▼5.9%	N/A
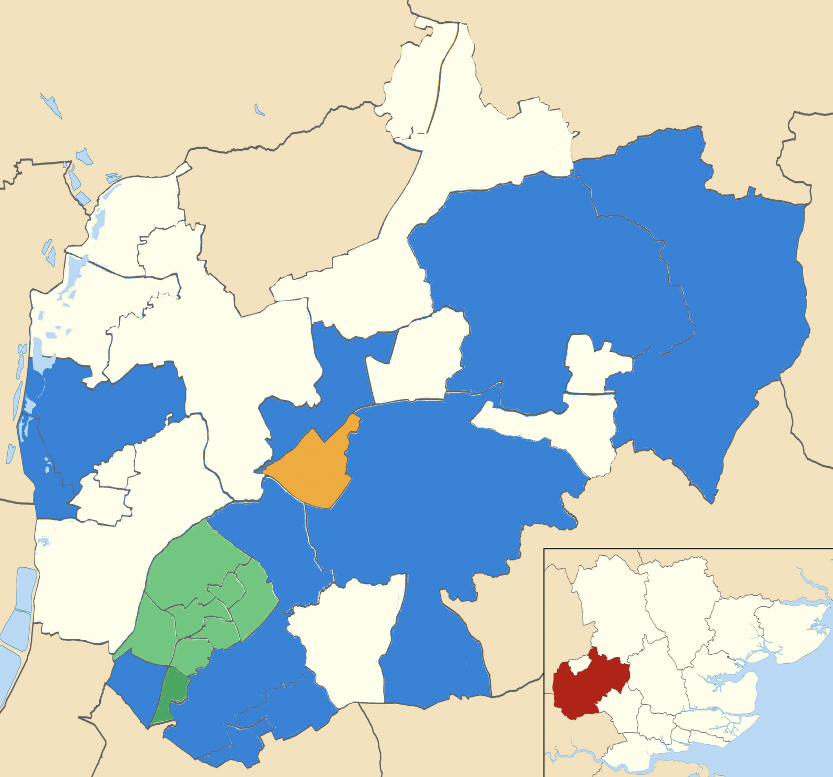
- Results of the 2016 District Council elections

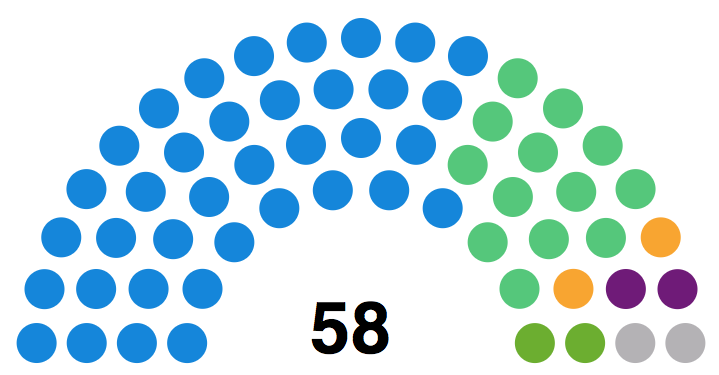
- Council composition following the election
Council control before election
Conservative
Council control after election
Conservative

The 2016 Epping Forest District Council election took place on 5 May 2016 to elect members of Epping Forest District Council in England. This was on the same day as other local elections.

This election saw the most seats won by the Loughton Residents Association winning 13 out of 14 Loughton seats, barring one seat in Loughton Roding where long-term incumbent Stephen Murray sits.

== Ward results ==
Detailed below are all of the candidates nominated to stand for each ward in the election and the results.

=== Buckhurst Hill East ===
Buckhurst Hill East
Party	Candidate	Votes	%	±%
Green	Simon Heap	656	45.2	+4.8
Conservative	Neville Wright	593	40.9	+3.5
UKIP	Simon Hearn	201	13.9	N/A
Majority		63	4.3	
Turnout		1,450	41.0	
Green gain from Conservative		Swing		

=== Buckhurst Hill West ===
Buckhurst Hill West
Party	Candidate	Votes	%	±%
Conservative	Gavin Chambers	1033	58.7	−4.8
Green	Elanor Furlong	348	19.8	+10.4
Liberal Democrats	Joseph Barkham	333	18.9	+3.3
Young People's	Gerard Wadsworth	46	2.6	N/A
Majority		685	38.9	
Turnout		1,760	33.0	
Conservative hold		Swing		

=== Chigwell Row ===
Chigwell Row
Party	Candidate	Votes	%	±%
Conservative	Brian Sandler	372	62.9	−9.3
Liberal Democrats	Joanne Alexander-Sefre	176	29.8	+24.4
Green	Rupert Nelson	43	7.3	−3.5
Majority		196	33.1	
Turnout		591	32.0	
Conservative hold		Swing		

=== Chigwell Village ===
Chigwell Village
Party	Candidate	Votes	%	±%
Conservative	John Knapman	743	75.1	+12.7
Green	Christopher Lord	124	12.5	+6.7
Labour	Isuru Perera	123	12.4	+1.1
Majority		619	62.6	
Turnout		990	29.0	
Conservative hold		Swing		

=== Epping Hemnall ===
Epping Hemnall
Party	Candidate	Votes	%	±%
Liberal Democrats	Jon Whitehouse	1,026	56.8	+24.5
Conservative	Daniel Spillman	619	34.3	−4.7
Labour	Inez Collier	160	8.9	+0.3
Majority		407	22.5	
Turnout		1,805	37.0	
Liberal Democrats hold		Swing		

=== Epping Lindsay & Thornwood Common ===
Epping Lindsey and Thornwood Common
Party	Candidate	Votes	%	±%
Conservative	Holly Whitbread	927	54.9	−6.8
Liberal Democrats	Cherry McCredie	388	23.0	+7.2
Labour	Simon Bullough	252	14.9	+6.0
Green	Rhys Martin	121	7.2	+2.3
Majority		539	31.9	
Turnout		1,688	32.0	
Conservative hold		Swing		

=== Grange Hill ===
Grange Hill
Party	Candidate	Votes	%	±%
Conservative	Alan Lion	876	65.1	+9.8
Green	Alison Garnham	470	34.9	N/A
Majority		406	30.2	
Turnout		1,346	26.0	
Conservative hold		Swing		

=== High Ongar, Willingdale and the Rodings ===
High Ongar, Willingale and the Rodings
Party	Candidate	Votes	%	±%
Conservative	Maggie McEwen	323	71.5	−1.1
UKIP	Llyris Stebbings	95	21.0	N/A
English Democrat	Robin Tilbrook	34	7.5	−5.4
Majority		228	50.5	
Turnout		452	26.0	
Conservative hold		Swing		

=== Loughton Alderton ===
Loughton Alderton
Party	Candidate	Votes	%	±%
Loughton Residents	Debra Roberts	554	63.8	+6.0
Conservative	Jonathan Hunter	168	19.4	+2.0
Labour	Angela Ayre	146	16.8	+3.6
Majority		386	44.5	
Turnout		868	25.0	
Loughton Residents hold		Swing		

=== Loughton Broadway ===
Loughton Broadway
Party	Candidate	Votes	%	±%
Loughton Residents	Leon Girling	574	68.7	+28.0
UKIP	Barry Johns	186	22.3	−12.2
Conservative	Darshan Sungar	75	9.0	+0.8
Majority		388	46.4	
Turnout		835	25.0	
Loughton Residents hold		Swing		

=== Loughton Fairmead ===
Loughton Fairmead
Party	Candidate	Votes	%	±%
Loughton Residents	David Wixley	689	84.9	+34.5
Conservative	Ryan Sparrowhawk	123	15.2	+0.4
Majority		566	69.7	
Turnout		812	25.0	
Loughton Residents hold		Swing		

=== Loughton Forest ===
Loughton Forest (2 seats due to vacancy)
Party	Candidate	Votes	%	±%
Loughton Residents	Amy Beales	696	28.5	N/A
Loughton Residents	Roger Baldwin	659	27.0	N/A
Conservative	Stephen Porcas	512	21.0	N/A
Conservative	Chris Criscione	473	20.1	N/A
Liberal Democrats	Paul Rissbrook	94	3.8	N/A
Majority		37	1.5	
Turnout		2,434	38.0	
Loughton Residents gain from Conservative		Swing		
Loughton Residents hold		Swing		

=== Loughton Roding ===
Loughton Roding
Party	Candidate	Votes	%	±%
Loughton Residents	Rose Brooks	1,063	84.1	N/A
Conservative	Sam Clark	201	15.9	−5.2
Majority		862	68.2	
Turnout		1,264	35.0	
Loughton Residents hold		Swing		

=== Loughton St. John's ===
Loughton St Johns
Party	Candidate	Votes	%	±%
Loughton Residents	Caroline Pond	982	81.8	+12.0
Conservative	Bob Church	218	18.2	−3.0
Majority		764	63.6	
Turnout		1,200	35.0	
Loughton Residents hold		Swing		

=== Loughton St. Mary's ===
Loughton St. Mary's
Party	Candidate	Votes	%	±%
Loughton Residents	Judy Jennings	901	69.0	+1.9
Conservative	Jaswinder Phull	327	25.1	+1.9
Liberal Democrats	James Ridgwell	77	5.9	+3.8
Majority		574	43.9	
Turnout		1,305	34.0	
Loughton Residents hold		Swing		

=== Moreton & Fyfield ===
Moreton & Fyfield
Party	Candidate	Votes	%	±%
Conservative	Tony Boyce	378	75.5	−0.2
UKIP	David Mills	123	24.6	N/A
Majority		255	50.9	
Turnout		501	31.0	
Conservative hold		Swing		

=== Passingford ===
Passingford
Party	Candidate	Votes	%	±%
Conservative	Heather Brady	Unopposed		
Majority		N/A	N/A	
Turnout		N/A	N/A	
Conservative hold		Swing		

=== Theydon Bois ===
Theydon Bois
Party	Candidate	Votes	%	±%
Conservative	John Phillip	831	76.6	+6.2
Liberal Democrats	George Lund	254	23.4	−6.2
Majority		577	53.2	
Turnout		1,085	33.0	
Conservative hold		Swing		

=== Waltham Abbey Honey Lane ===
Waltham Abbey Honey Lane
Party	Candidate	Votes	%	±%
Conservative	Glynis Shiell	607	57.6	−20.3
Labour	Mitch Diamond-Conway	303	28.8	N/A
Green	Linda Johnson-Laird	144	13.7	N/A
Majority		304	28.8	
Turnout		1,054	23.0	
Conservative hold		Swing		

=== Waltham Abbey North East ===
Waltham Abbey North East
Party	Candidate	Votes	%	±%
Conservative	Jeane Lea	510	57.6	−15.2
UKIP	Barbara Robertson	229	25.9	N/A
Liberal Democrats	Timothy Vaughan	79	8.9	−18.3
Green	Elliot Seymour	67	7.6	N/A
Majority		281	34.7	
Turnout		806	27.0	
Conservative hold		Swing		

=== Waltham Abbey South West ===
Waltham Abbey South West
Party	Candidate	Votes	%	±%
Conservative	Helen Kane	309	41.6	−4.4
UKIP	Ron McEvoy	259	34.9	+3.5
Green	Dave Plummer	175	23.6	+10.2
Majority		50	6.7	
Turnout		743	23.0	
Conservative hold		Swing		
