= 1996 Epping Forest District Council election =

UK local election

- 2 May 1996

20 out of 59 seats to Epping Forest District Council 1 by-election to Loughton Roding 30 seats needed for a majority

| | First party | Second party | Third party |
|---|---|---|---|
| Party | Labour | Liberal Democrats | Conservative |
| Last election | 18 seats, 37.0% | 10 seats, 20.0% | 18 seats, 28.2% |
| Seats before | 17 | 10 | 18 |
| Seats after | 19 | 16 | 11 |
| Seat change | ▲1 | ▲6 | ▼7 |
| Popular vote | 7,557 | 5,221 | 7,091 |
| Percentage | 31.7% | 21.9% | 29.8% |
| Swing | ▼5.3% | ▲1.9% | ▲1.6% |
| | Fourth party | Fifth party | Sixth party |
| Party | Loughton Residents | Independent | Epping Residents |
| Last election | 7 seats, 3.7% | 3 seats, N/A | 3 seats, 4.6% |
| Seats before | 7 | 3 | 3 |
| Seats after | 7 | 4 | 2 |
| Seat change | Steady | ▲1 | ▼1 |
| Popular vote | 2,101 | 1,143 | 674 |
| Percentage | 8.8% | 4.8% | 2.8% |
| Swing | ▲5.1% | N/A | ▼1.8% |
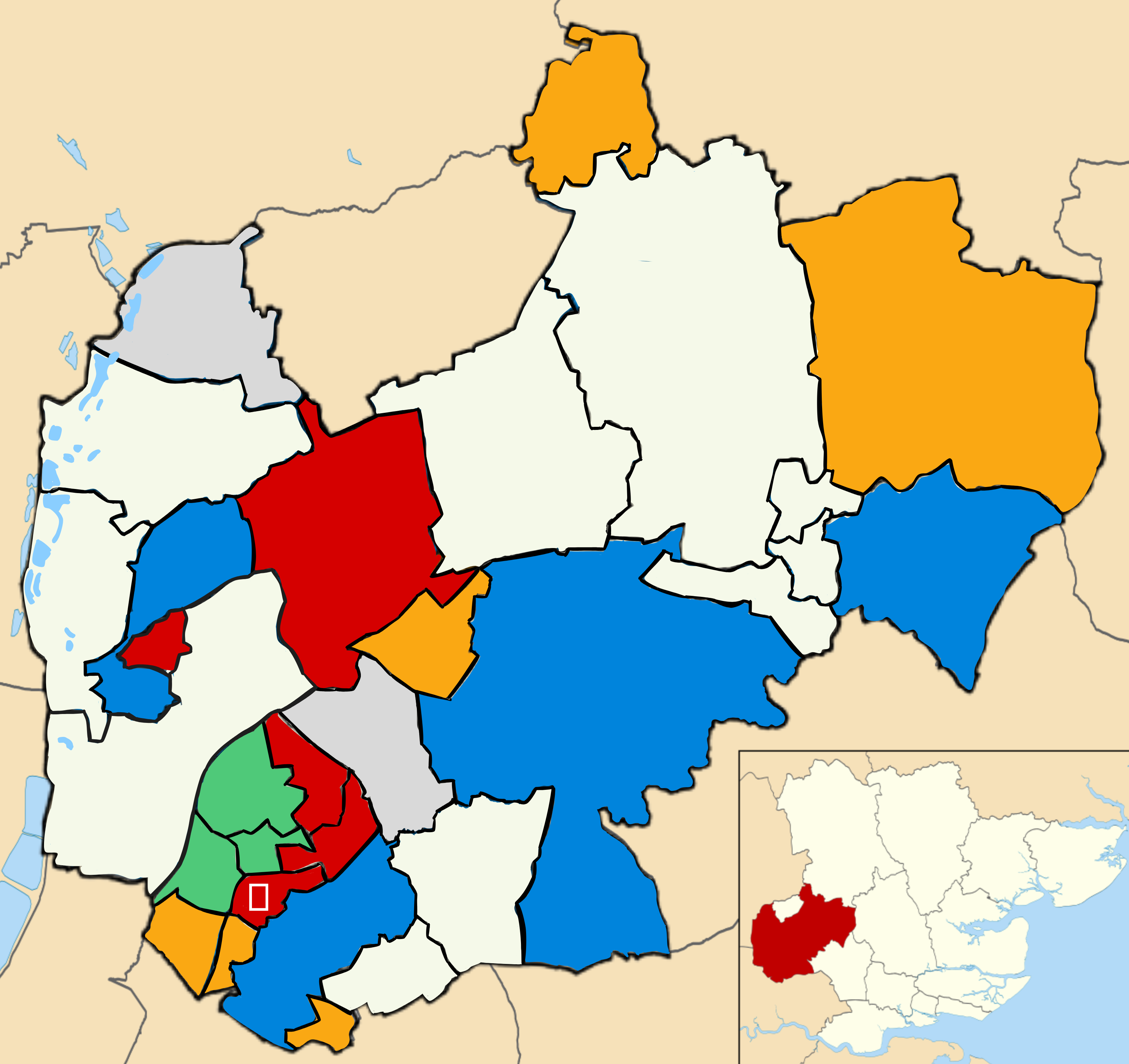
- Winner of each seat at the 1996 Epping Forest District Council election Rectangular inset (Loughton Roding): By-election result
Leader before election
Labour-Liberal Democrat coalition
Leader after election
Labour-Liberal Democrat coalition
No overall control

The 1996 Epping Forest District Council election took place on 2 May 1996 to elect members of Epping Forest District Council in Essex, England. 20 members of Epping Forest District Council in Essex were elected, alongside one by-election in Loughton Roding. The council remained in no overall control allowing Labour, as the largest party, to join into a coalition with the Liberal Democrats who had experiences significant gains and beat the Conservatives into third place across the district in terms of seats.

== Background ==
The 1996 Epping Forest District Council election took place against a turbulent national backdrop that was deeply unfavourable to the governing Conservatives. At Westminster, John Major’s government was beset by crisis, its parliamentary majority whittled down to just three seats by spring. A series of scandals, economic troubles, and public discontent had left the party languishing in the polls. In January, Labour surged to 55% in a MORI poll, with a commanding 26-point lead, while defections such as Arthur Scargill’s creation of the Socialist Labour Party underlined broader fractures on the left. Meanwhile, the country was shaken by events including the Docklands and London bus bombings, the Dunblane massacre, and the BSE crisis.

Locally, the Conservatives’ decline was felt more starkly than ever before. For the first time in the history of Epping Forest District Council, the party fell to third place overall, behind both Labour and the Liberal Democrats. The Liberal Democrats enjoyed their strongest performance yet in the district, recording their largest ever gain of seats and making major inroads across the both built up and rural areas. Labour also advanced, taking Epping Lindsey with less than 30% of the vote after a split contest involving the Conservatives and the Epping Residents Association.

The Conservatives, by contrast, suffered heavy reverses. They lost not only traditional marginal wards but also their grip on Theydon Bois, a long-standing stronghold that voted in an Independent candidate. This result boosted the number of Independents on the council to four, further fragmenting the chamber. The Epping Residents Association also lost ground, including the symbolic defeat in Epping Lindsey.

The outcome forced a dramatic reordering of council politics. With no party close to an outright majority, Labour and the Liberal Democrats reached a coalition agreement to administer the authority, sidelining the Conservatives. This election would see the high water mark for both Labour and Liberal Democrats. By 2011, no Labour councillors would sit in the council chamber.

== Results summary ==
1996 Epping Forest District Council election
| Party | This election | | | | Full council | | | This election | | |
| Party | Candidates | Seats | Net | Seats % | Other | Total | Total % | Votes | Votes % | +/− |
|---|---|---|---|---|---|---|---|---|---|---|
| Labour | {{{candidates}}} | 6 | ▲1 | 28.5 | 13 | 19 | 32.2 | 7,557 | 31.7 | ▼5.3 |
| Liberal Democrats | {{{candidates}}} | 6 | ▲6 | 28.5 | 10 | 16 | 27.1 | 5,221 | 21.9 | ▲1.9 |
| Conservative | {{{candidates}}} | 4 | ▼7 | 19.0 | 7 | 11 | 18.6 | 7,091 | 29.8 | ▲1.6 |
| Loughton Residents | {{{candidates}}} | 3 | Steady | 14.2 | 4 | 7 | 11.8 | 2,101 | 8.8 | ▲5.1 |
| Independent | {{{candidates}}} | 2 | ▲1 | 9.5 | 2 | 2 | 3.3 | 1,143 | 4.8 | N/A |
| Epping Residents | {{{candidates}}} | 0 | ▼1 | 9.5 | 2 | 2 | 3.3 | 674 | 2.8 | ▼1.8 |

== Ward results ==
=== Buckhurst Hill East ===
Buckhurst Hill East
| Party | Candidate | Votes | % | ±% |
|---|---|---|---|---|
| Liberal Democrats | L. Martin | 865 | 66.8 | ▲2.2 |
| Labour | J. Croke* | 225 | 17.4 | ▼0.5 |
| Conservative | R. Watts | 205 | 15.8 | ▼1.8 |
| Majority | | 640 | 49.4 | N/A |
| Turnout | | 1,295 | 38.4 | ▲0.2 |
| Registered electors | | 3,377 | | |
| Liberal Democrats gain from Labour | | Swing | | |

*Croke was elected in 1992 as an SDP councillor but defected during the middle of her term, hence the result is shown as a Labour loss.

=== Buckhurst Hill West ===
Buckhurst Hill West
| Party | Candidate | Votes | % | ±% |
|---|---|---|---|---|
| Liberal Democrats | A. Haigh | 1,032 | 60.3 | ▲2.8 |
| Conservative | A. Torgut | 534 | 31.2 | ▼2.9 |
| Labour | L. Baddock | 146 | 8.5 | ▲0.1 |
| Majority | | 498 | 29.1 | N/A |
| Turnout | | 1,712 | 33.6 | ▼1.5 |
| Registered electors | | 5,093 | | |
| Liberal Democrats gain from Conservative | | Swing | | |

=== Chigwell Village ===
Chigwell Village
| Party | Candidate | Votes | % | ±% |
|---|---|---|---|---|
| Conservative | J. Gilliham* | 601 | 64.4 | ▲4.4 |
| Liberal Democrats | M. Spence | 185 | 19.8 | ▼6.8 |
| Labour | D. Wing | 147 | 15.8 | ▲2.4 |
| Majority | | 416 | 44.6 | ▲11.1 |
| Turnout | | 933 | 28.4 | ▼10.6 |
| Registered electors | | 3,283 | | |
| Conservative hold | | Swing | | |

=== Debden Green ===
Debden Green
| Party | Candidate | Votes | % | ±% |
|---|---|---|---|---|
| Labour | C. Huckle* | 882 | 77.7 | ▲5.3 |
| Conservative | C. Flan | 253 | 22.3 | ▲4.8 |
| Majority | | 629 | 55.4 | ▲0.5 |
| Turnout | | 1,135 | 29.2 | ▼6.7 |
| Registered electors | | 3,882 | | |
| Labour hold | | Swing | | |

=== Epping Hemnall ===
Epping Hemnall
| Party | Candidate | Votes | % | ±% |
|---|---|---|---|---|
| Liberal Democrats | Janet Whitehouse | 806 | 43.3 | ▲12.2 |
| Conservative | P. Burns* | 529 | 28.4 | ▼2.8 |
| Labour | B. Johns | 272 | 14.6 | ▼1.9 |
| Epping Residents | L. Barry | 254 | 13.6 | ▼8.6 |
| Majority | | 277 | 14.9 | N/A |
| Turnout | | 1,861 | 38.9 | ▼3.4 |
| Registered electors | | 4,780 | | |
| Liberal Democrats gain from Conservative | | Swing | | |

=== Epping Lindsey ===
Epping Lindsey
| Party | Candidate | Votes | % | ±% |
|---|---|---|---|---|
| Labour | T. Norris | 455 | 29.9 | ▲4.0 |
| Conservative | Chris Whitbread | 426 | 28.0 | ▲2.6 |
| Epping Residents | J. Jones* | 420 | 27.6 | ▼12.3 |
| Liberal Democrats | A. Moss | 221 | 14.5 | ▲5.8 |
| Majority | | 29 | 1.9 | N/A |
| Turnout | | 1,522 | 32.1 | ▼7.8 |
| Registered electors | | 4,748 | | |
| Labour gain from Epping Residents Association | | Swing | | |

=== Grange Hill ===
Grange Hill
| Party | Candidate | Votes | % | ±% |
|---|---|---|---|---|
| Liberal Democrats | S. Whiteford | 846 | 55.7 | ▲4.6 |
| Conservative | E. Buttling | 536 | 35.3 | ▼1.5 |
| Labour | D. Miller | 136 | 9.0 | ▼3.1 |
| Majority | | 310 | 20.4 | ▲6.1 |
| Turnout | | 1,518 | 33.7 | ▼2.0 |
| Registered electors | | 4,511 | | |
| Liberal Democrats gain from Conservative | | Swing | | |

=== High Ongar ===
High Ongar
| Party | Candidate | Votes | % | ±% |
|---|---|---|---|---|
| Conservative | M. McEwen | 263 | 58.4 | ▼3.6 |
| Labour | K. Tait | 187 | 41.6 | ▲30.5 |
| Majority | | 76 | 16.9 | ▼18.1 |
| Turnout | | 450 | 51.9 | ▲7.6 |
| Registered electors | | 867 | | |
| Conservative hold | | Swing | | |

=== Loughton Broadway ===
Loughton Broadway
| Party | Candidate | Votes | % | ±% |
|---|---|---|---|---|
| Labour | C. Baggarley | 1,156 | 83.8 | ▼2.9 |
| Conservative | I. Locks | 224 | 16.2 | ▲2.9 |
| Majority | | 932 | 67.6 | ▼5.8 |
| Turnout | | 1,380 | 34.4 | ▼5.2 |
| Registered electors | | 4,013 | | |
| Labour hold | | Swing | | |

=== Loughton Forest ===
Loughton Forest
| Party | Candidate | Votes | % | ±% |
|---|---|---|---|---|
| Loughton Residents | K. Ellis* | 729 | 68.8 | ▲6.0 |
| Conservative | J. Cantor | 203 | 19.2 | ▼4.7 |
| Labour | J. Ormston | 127 | 12.0 | ▼1.3 |
| Majority | | 526 | 49.6 | ▲10.8 |
| Turnout | | 1,059 | 34.7 | ▼8.5 |
| Registered electors | | 3,051 | | |
| Loughton Residents hold | | Swing | | |

=== Loughton Roding ===
Loughton Roding
| Party | Candidate | Votes | % | ±% |
|---|---|---|---|---|
| Labour | S. Goodwin* | 987 | 67.1 | ▲4.9 |
| Labour | Ms M. Boatman | 917 | | |
| Conservative | A. Jones | 299 | 20.3 | ▲7.9 |
| Conservative | L. Daniel | 256 | | |
| Liberal Democrats | L. Thompson | 186 | 12.6 | ▲6.8 |
| Liberal Democrats | J. Netherclift | 180 | | |
| Majority | | 688 | 46.7 | ▲4.0 |
| Turnout | | 1,908 | 37.1 | ▼21.2 |
| Registered electors | | 3,972 | | |
| Labour hold | | Swing | | |
| Labour hold | | Swing | | |

=== Loughton St. Johns ===
Loughton St. Johns
| Party | Candidate | Votes | % | ±% |
|---|---|---|---|---|
| Loughton Residents | R. Pearce | 737 | 50.5 | ▲3.4 |
| Conservative | S. Metcalfe | 468 | 32.1 | ▲1.7 |
| Labour | M. Juniper | 254 | 17.4 | ▼5.1 |
| Majority | | 269 | 18.4 | ▲1.7 |
| Turnout | | 1,459 | 34.4 | ▲2.1 |
| Registered electors | | 4,248 | | |
| Loughton Residents hold | | Swing | | |

=== Loughton St. Marys ===
Loughton St. Marys
| Party | Candidate | Votes | % | ±% |
|---|---|---|---|---|
| Loughton Residents | M. Wardle* | 635 | 58.7 | ▲2.2 |
| Labour | P. Lavin | 238 | 22.0 | ▼1.9 |
| Conservative | P. Gooch | 209 | 19.3 | ▼0.3 |
| Majority | | 397 | 36.7 | ▲4.1 |
| Turnout | | 1,082 | 32.4 | ▼9.6 |
| Registered electors | | 3,336 | | |
| Loughton Residents hold | | Swing | | |

=== Passingford ===
Passingford
| Party | Candidate | Votes | % | ±% |
|---|---|---|---|---|
| Conservative | J. Pledge* | N/A | N/A | N/A |
| Majority | | N/A | N/A | N/A |
| Turnout | | N/A | N/A | N/A |
| Registered electors | | 1,544 | | |
| Conservative hold | | Swing | | |

=== Roothing Country ===
Roothing Country
| Party | Candidate | Votes | % | ±% |
|---|---|---|---|---|
| Liberal Democrats | D. Kelly | 287 | 40.7 | ▲0.9 |
| Conservative | M. Wallis | 266 | 37.7 | ▼22.5 |
| Independent | K. Percy | 153 | 21.7 | N/A |
| Majority | | 21 | 3.0 | N/A |
| Turnout | | 706 | 56.8 | ▼3.1 |
| Registered electors | | 1,244 | | |
| Liberal Democrats gain from Conservative | | Swing | | |

=== Roydon ===
Roydon
| Party | Candidate | Votes | % | ±% |
|---|---|---|---|---|
| Independent | A. Vare | 356 | 46.6 | N/A |
| Labour | N. Castleden | 276 | 36.1 | N/A |
| Liberal Democrats | C. Bagnall | 132 | 17.3 | N/A |
| Majority | | 80 | 10.5 | N/A |
| Turnout | | 764 | 47.3 | ▲13.2 |
| Registered electors | | 1,615 | | |
| Independent gain from Independent | | Swing | | |

=== Sheering ===
Sheering
| Party | Candidate | Votes | % | ±% |
|---|---|---|---|---|
| Liberal Democrats | D. Yeo | 370 | 48.3 | N/A |
| Conservative | M. Ridgewell* | 211 | 27.5 | ▼41.1 |
| Labour | J. Finlay | 185 | 24.2 | ▼7.2 |
| Majority | | 159 | 20.8 | N/A |
| Turnout | | 766 | 34.4 | ▼0.9 |
| Registered electors | | 2,229 | | |
| Liberal Democrats gain from Conservative | | Swing | | |

=== Theydon Bois ===
Theydon Bois
| Party | Candidate | Votes | % | ±% |
|---|---|---|---|---|
| Independent | C. Gillam | 634 | 43.9 | N/A |
| Conservative | J. Axon* | 374 | 25.9 | ▼41.0 |
| Labour | S. Gymer | 290 | 20.1 | ▼13.0 |
| Liberal Democrats | I. Black | 147 | 10.2 | N/A |
| Majority | | 260 | 18.0 | N/A |
| Turnout | | 1,445 | 45.6 | ▲3.8 |
| Registered electors | | 3,171 | | |
| Independent gain from Conservative | | Swing | | |

=== Waltham Abbey East ===
Waltham Abbey East
| Party | Candidate | Votes | % | ±% |
|---|---|---|---|---|
| Conservative | E. Webster* | 934 | 47.7 | ▲7.1 |
| Labour | A. Liddell | 880 | 44.9 | ▼6.9 |
| Liberal Democrats | P. Brooks | 144 | 7.4 | ▼0.2 |
| Majority | | 54 | 2.8 | ▲8.4 |
| Turnout | | 1,958 | 34.1 | ▲1.7 |
| Registered electors | | 5,738 | | |
| Conservative hold | | Swing | | |

=== Waltham Abbey Paternoster ===
Waltham Abbey Paternoster
| Party | Candidate | Votes | % | ±% |
|---|---|---|---|---|
| Labour | C. Sumner | 714 | 56.2 | ▼2.4 |
| Conservative | L. Rowley | 556 | 43.8 | ▲2.4 |
| Majority | | 158 | 12.4 | ▼4.8 |
| Turnout | | 1,270 | 35.6 | ▲2.0 |
| Registered electors | | 3,566 | | |
| Labour gain from Conservative | | Swing | | |
