= 2023 Epping Forest District Council election =

2023 UK local government election

- 4 May 2023

18 out of 58 seats to Epping Forest District Council 30 seats needed for a majority
- Turnout: 26.1%
| | First party | Second party | Third party |
|---|---|---|---|
| Leader | Chris Whitbread | Caroline Pond | Jon Whitehouse |
| Party | Conservative | Loughton Residents | Liberal Democrats |
| Leader's seat | Roydon | Loughton St. John's | Epping Hemnall |
| Last election | 35 seats, 40.3% | 13 seats, 17.3% | 4 seats, 18.3% |
| Seats before | 32 (Note: Two left to become Independents. One vacancy prior to the election due to the death of Cllr Brian Rolfe) | 13 | 4 |
| Seats after | 34 | 13 | 6 |
| Seat change | ▼1 | Steady | ▲2 |
| Popular vote | 7,214 | N/A | 3,349 |
| Percentage | 48.3% | N/A | 22.4% |
| Swing | ▲8.0% | N/A | ▲4.1% |
| | Fourth party | Fifth party | Sixth party |
| Leader | N/A | Simon Heap | Julian Leppert |
| Party | Independent inc. Grange Hill Ind. Group | Green | British Democrats |
| Leader's seat | N/A | Buckhurst Hill East | Waltham Abbey Paternoster |
| Last election | 2 seats, 5.9% | 3 seats, 3.4% | 1 seats, 0.1% |
| Seats before | 3 (Note: Cllr Sheree Rackham and Nigel Avey resigned from the party) | 2 | 1 |
| Seats after | 3 | 2 | 0 |
| Seat change | ▲1 | ▼1 | ▼1 |
| Popular vote | 690 | 314 | 187 |
| Percentage | 4.6% | 2.1% | 1.3% |
| Swing | ▼1.3% | ▼1.3% | N/A |
- Winner of each seat at the 2023 Epping Forest District Council election
Leader before election
Chris Whitbread
Conservative
Leader after election
Chris Whitbread
Conservative

The 2023 Epping Forest District Council election took place on 4 May 2023 to elect members of Epping Forest District Council in Essex, England. There were 18 of the 58 seats up for election, being the usual approximate third of the council. This was on the same day as other local elections across England.

The Conservatives retained their majority on the council.

== Summary ==
=== Election result ===
The overall results were:

2023 Epping Forest District Council election
| Party | This election | | | Full council | | | This election | | |
| Party | Seats | Net | Seats % | Other | Total | Total % | Votes | Votes % | +/− |
|---|---|---|---|---|---|---|---|---|---|
| Conservative | 14 | ▼1 | 77.8 | 20 | 34 | 58.6 | 7,214 | 48.3 | +8.0 |
| Loughton Residents | 0 | Steady | 0.0 | 13 | 13 | 22.4 | N/A | N/A | –17.3 |
| Liberal Democrats | 3 | ▲2 | 16.7 | 3 | 6 | 10.3 | 3,349 | 22.4 | +4.1 |
| Independent | 1 | Steady | 5.6 | 2 | 3 | 5.2 | 690 | 4.6 | –1.3 |
| Green | 0 | Steady | 0.0 | 2 | 2 | 3.4 | 314 | 2.1 | –1.3 |
| Labour | 0 | Steady | 0.0 | 0 | 0 | 0.0 | 2,940 | 19.7 | +6.5 |
| British Democrats | 0 | ▼1 | 0.0 | 0 | 0 | 0.0 | 187 | 1.3 | N/A |
| Reform | 0 | Steady | 0.0 | 0 | 0 | 0.0 | 107 | 0.7 | +0.6 |
| English Democrat | 0 | Steady | 0.0 | 0 | 0 | 0.0 | 34 | 0.2 | –0.1 |
| Shared Ground | 0 | Steady | 0.0 | 0 | 0 | 0.0 | 32 | 0.2 | –0.5 |
| TUSC | 0 | Steady | 0.0 | 0 | 0 | 0.0 | 67 | 0.4 | ±0.0 |

== Ward results ==
The Statement of Persons Nominated, which details the candidates standing in each ward, was released by Epping Forest District Council following the close of nomination on 5 April 2023. The results for each ward were:

=== Broadley Common, Epping Upland & Nazeing ===
Broadley Common, Epping Upland & Nazeing
| Party | Candidate | Votes | % | ±% |
|---|---|---|---|---|
| Conservative | Andy Green | 288 | 69.7 | –1.9 |
| Liberal Democrats | Richard Griffiths | 68 | 16.5 | +8.1 |
| Labour | Sarebjit Sangha | 57 | 13.8 | N/A |
| Majority | | 220 | 53.2 | +1.5 |
| Turnout | | 413 | 23.5 | –1.5 |
| Registered electors | | 1,755 | | |
| Conservative hold | | Swing | ▼5.0 | |

The previous incumbent, Nigel Avey, had been elected as a Conservative in 2019 but left the party to sit as an independent earlier in 2023. He did not stand for re-election. Seat recorded as a Conservative hold to compare with the previous election.

=== Buckhurst Hill West ===
Buckhurst Hill West
| Party | Candidate | Votes | % | ±% |
|---|---|---|---|---|
| Conservative | Aniket Patel* | 730 | 44.4 | –14.1 |
| Labour | Tom Kasperkowicz | 273 | 16.6 | N/A |
| Independent | Jo Share-Berina | 222 | 13.5 | N/A |
| Liberal Democrats | Ishvinder Matharu | 190 | 11.6 | –21.2 |
| Green | Alan Fricker | 147 | 8.9 | N/A |
| Independent | Lyubka Vesselinov | 51 | 3.1 | N/A |
| Shared Ground | Thomas Hall | 32 | 1.9 | –6.8 |
| Majority | | 457 | 27.8 | +2.1 |
| Turnout | | 1,653 | 31.6 | –1.3 |
| Registered electors | | 5,226 | | |
| Conservative hold | | Swing | N/A | |

=== Chipping Ongar, Greensted and Marden Ash ===
Chipping Ongar, Greensted and Marden Ash
| Party | Candidate | Votes | % | ±% |
|---|---|---|---|---|
| Conservative | Paul Keska* | 520 | 57.6 | –1.3 |
| Labour | Ron Huish | 168 | 18.6 | +2.9 |
| Liberal Democrats | Monica Richardson | 157 | 17.4 | +2.3 |
| Reform | Peter Bell | 57 | 6.3 | +3.6 |
| Majority | | 352 | 39.0 | –4.2 |
| Turnout | | 904 | 26.8 | –1.5 |
| Registered electors | | 3,380 | | |
| Conservative hold | | Swing | ▼2.1 | |

=== Epping Hemnall ===
Epping Hemnall
| Party | Candidate | Votes | % | ±% |
|---|---|---|---|---|
| Liberal Democrats | Cherry McCredie* | 1,123 | 65.9 | +3.1 |
| Conservative | Mari-Louise Whitbread | 450 | 26.4 | –2.0 |
| Labour | Inez Collier | 130 | 7.6 | –1.2 |
| Majority | | 673 | 39.5 | +5.1 |
| Turnout | | 1,724 | 35.5 | –2.1 |
| Registered electors | | 4,852 | | |
| Liberal Democrats hold | | Swing | ▲2.6 | |

=== Epping Lindsay and Thornwood Common ===
Epping Lindsay and Thornwood Common
| Party | Candidate | Votes | % | ±% |
|---|---|---|---|---|
| Liberal Democrats | Razia Sharif | 1,052 | 54.7 | +11.5 |
| Conservative | Sue Jones | 750 | 39.0 | –8.2 |
| Labour | Simon Bullough | 120 | 6.2 | –3.4 |
| Majority | | 302 | 15.7 | N/A |
| Turnout | | 1,956 | 37.0 | –0.7 |
| Registered electors | | 5,284 | | |
| Liberal Democrats gain from Conservative | | Swing | ▲9.9 | |

=== Grange Hill ===
Grange Hill
| Party | Candidate | Votes | % | ±% |
|---|---|---|---|---|
| Independent | Lisa Morgan | 417 | 38.3 | N/A |
| Conservative | David Saunders | 374 | 34.3 | –27.1 |
| Labour | Onike Gollo | 240 | 22.0 | –16.6 |
| Green | Tony Hanch | 59 | 5.4 | N/A |
| Majority | | 42 | 4.0 | N/A |
| Turnout | | 1,102 | 21.4 | –4.0 |
| Registered electors | | 5,143 | | |
| Independent gain from Conservative | | Swing | N/A | |

The previous incumbent, Sheree Rackham, had been elected as a Conservative in 2019. She left the party in 2022 and subsequently sat as an independent for the remainder of her term. She did not stand for re-election. Seat recorded as a Conservative hold to compare with the previous election.

=== Hastingwood, Matching and Sheering Village ===
Hastingwood, Matching and Sheering Village
| Party | Candidate | Votes | % | ±% |
|---|---|---|---|---|
| Conservative | Richard Morgan* | 379 | 67.2 | N/A |
| Labour | Michelle Gwynn | 123 | 21.8 | N/A |
| Liberal Democrats | Paul Ward | 62 | 11.0 | N/A |
| Majority | | 256 | 45.4 | N/A |
| Turnout | | 565 | 28.8 | N/A |
| Registered electors | | 1,965 | | |
| Conservative hold | | Swing | N/A | |

=== Lambourne ===
Lambourne
| Party | Candidate | Votes | % | ±% |
|---|---|---|---|---|
| Conservative | Craig McCann | 257 | 69.6 | –5.1 |
| Labour | Alison Wingfield | 62 | 16.8 | N/A |
| Liberal Democrats | Naomi Davies | 50 | 13.6 | –11.7 |
| Majority | | 195 | 52.8 | +3.4 |
| Turnout | | 371 | 23.5 | –3.5 |
| Registered electors | | 1,578 | | |
| Conservative hold | | Swing | N/A | |

=== Lower Nazeing ===
Lower Nazeing
| Party | Candidate | Votes | % | ±% |
|---|---|---|---|---|
| Conservative | Richard Bassett* | 469 | 65.1 | –4.0 |
| Labour | Elizabeth Marsh | 104 | 14.4 | N/A |
| Liberal Democrats | Elaine Thatcher | 97 | 13.5 | –17.4 |
| Reform | Martin Harvey | 50 | 6.9 | N/A |
| Majority | | 365 | 50.7 | +6.7 |
| Turnout | | 723 | 21.5 | –1.4 |
| Registered electors | | 3,360 | | |
| Conservative hold | | Swing | N/A | |

=== Lower Sheering ===
Lower Sheering
| Party | Candidate | Votes | % | ±% |
|---|---|---|---|---|
| Liberal Democrats | Lesley Paine | 226 | 45.5 | +13.7 |
| Conservative | Simon Baker | 206 | 41.4 | –26.8 |
| Labour | Janine Williams | 65 | 13.1 | N/A |
| Majority | | 20 | 4.1 | N/A |
| Turnout | | 503 | 29.5 | +6.5 |
| Registered electors | | 1,706 | | |
| Liberal Democrats gain from Conservative | | Swing | ▲20.3 | |

=== North Weald Bassett ===
North Weald Bassett
| Party | Candidate | Votes | % | ±% |
|---|---|---|---|---|
| Conservative | Jaymey McIvor* | 507 | 57.9 | –5.5 |
| Labour | Kevin Hind | 221 | 25.2 | +5.8 |
| Liberal Democrats | Edward Barnard | 148 | 16.9 | –0.4 |
| Majority | | 286 | 32.7 | –11.3 |
| Turnout | | 892 | 24.7 | –3.1 |
| Registered electors | | 3,603 | | |
| Conservative hold | | Swing | ▼5.7 | |

=== Roydon ===
Roydon
| Party | Candidate | Votes | % | ±% |
|---|---|---|---|---|
| Conservative | Chris Whitbread* | 315 | 64.9 | –6.4 |
| Labour | Alex Kyriacou-Drummond | 170 | 35.1 | +19.3 |
| Majority | | 145 | 29.8 | –25.7 |
| Turnout | | 487 | 28.3 | +0.3 |
| Registered electors | | 1,724 | | |
| Conservative hold | | Swing | ▼12.9 | |

Chris Whitbread changed ward at this election; he was the sitting councillor for Epping Lindsey and Thornwood Common.

=== Shelley ===
Shelley
| Party | Candidate | Votes | % | ±% |
|---|---|---|---|---|
| Conservative | Nigel Bedford* | 162 | 49.1 | N/A |
| Labour | Tom Acornley | 110 | 33.3 | N/A |
| English Democrat | Robin Tilbrook | 34 | 10.3 | N/A |
| Liberal Democrats | Peter Sinfield | 24 | 7.3 | N/A |
| Majority | | 52 | 15.8 | N/A |
| Turnout | | 330 | 17.4 | N/A |
| Registered electors | | 1,894 | | |
| Conservative hold | | Swing | N/A | |

=== Waltham Abbey High Beach ===
Waltham Abbey High Beach
| Party | Candidate | Votes | % | ±% |
|---|---|---|---|---|
| Conservative | Tim Matthews* | 289 | 67.5 | +3.7 |
| Labour | Martin Morris | 139 | 32.5 | +17.3 |
| Majority | | 150 | 35.0 | –8.0 |
| Turnout | | 431 | 21.3 | –9.6 |
| Registered electors | | 2,024 | | |
| Conservative hold | | Swing | ▼6.8 | |

=== Waltham Abbey Honey Lane ===
Waltham Abbey Honey Lane
| Party | Candidate | Votes | % | ±% |
|---|---|---|---|---|
| Conservative | Sam Kane* | 487 | 54.4 | –4.5 |
| Labour | Simon Harris | 367 | 41.0 | +6.1 |
| TUSC | Ian Pattison | 42 | 4.7 | –1.4 |
| Majority | | 120 | 13.4 | –10.6 |
| Turnout | | 908 | 20.5 | –3.2 |
| Registered electors | | 4,435 | | |
| Conservative hold | | Swing | ▼5.3 | |

=== Waltham Abbey North East ===
Waltham Abbey North East
| Party | Candidate | Votes | % | ±% |
|---|---|---|---|---|
| Conservative | Jodie Lucas* | 426 | 56.5 | –7.8 |
| Labour | Angela Ayre | 208 | 27.6 | N/A |
| Liberal Democrats | Phil Chadburn | 120 | 15.9 | –19.8 |
| Majority | | 218 | 28.9 | +0.3 |
| Turnout | | 758 | 24.3 | –2.2 |
| Registered electors | | 3,125 | | |
| Conservative hold | | Swing | N/A | |

=== Waltham Abbey Paternoster ===
Waltham Abbey Paternoster
| Party | Candidate | Votes | % | ±% |
|---|---|---|---|---|
| Conservative | Maria Markham | 293 | 39.4 | –20.5 |
| Labour | Robert Greyson | 250 | 33.6 | –3.0 |
| British Democrats | Julian Leppert* | 187 | 25.2 | N/A |
| TUSC | Bea Gardner | 13 | 1.7 | –1.9 |
| Majority | | 43 | 5.8 | –17.5 |
| Turnout | | 751 | 22.3 | +2.5 |
| Registered electors | | 3,374 | | |
| Conservative gain from British Democrats | | Swing | ▼8.8 | |

Julian Leppert had been elected as a For Britain Movement councillor in 2019. On that party's demise in July 2022 he joined the British Democratic Party, under which banner he stood for re-election in 2023 and was defeated.

=== Waltham Abbey South West ===
Waltham Abbey South West
| Party | Candidate | Votes | % | ±% |
|---|---|---|---|---|
| Conservative | Joseph Parsons* | 312 | 52.3 | –16.8 |
| Labour | Debbie Wild | 133 | 22.3 | +2.5 |
| Green | Dave Plummer | 108 | 18.1 | +12.9 |
| Liberal Democrats | Marc Beecroft | 32 | 5.4 | N/A |
| TUSC | Josh Asker | 12 | 2.0 | N/A |
| Majority | | 179 | 30.0 | –19.3 |
| Turnout | | 603 | 18.3 | –6.3 |
| Registered electors | | 3,297 | | |
| Conservative gain from Green | | Swing | ▼9.7 | |

Joseph Parsons had won this seat for the Conservatives from the Greens at a by-election in October 2022. Seat recorded as a Conservative gain from Greens here to allow comparison to last full elections.

== Parish council results ==
Below are the results from the parish and town councils that had contested elections. There were uncontested elections to several other parish councils in the district, but given these parish councillors were not elected via a vote, they have been omitted from this list.

=== Epping Town Council ===
Overall parish results
| Party | Vote | % | ± | Seats before | Seats after | ± |
|---|---|---|---|---|---|---|
| Conservative | 5,664 | 42.2 | ▼17.8 | 8 | 3 | ▼4 |
| Liberal Democrats | 4,265 | 31.8 | ▼0.4 | 4 | 4 | Steady |
| Independent | 3,471 | 25.9 | ▲24.2 | 0 | 5 | ▲4 |
| Turnout | 13,400 | | | 12 | 12 | |

==== Epping Hemnall ====
| Party | Vote | % | ± | Seats before | Seats after | ± |
|---|---|---|---|---|---|---|
| Liberal Democrats | 4,265 | 56.0 | ▲18.9 | 2 | 4 | ▲2 |
| Conservative | 1,750 | 23.0 | ▼30.7 | 4 | 0 | ▼4 |
| Independent | 1,603 | 21.0 | ▲17.6 | 0 | 2 | ▲2 |
| Turnout | 7,618 | 35.0 | | | | |
| Electorate | 5,022 | | | | | |

==== Epping St. John's ====
| Party | Vote | % | ± | Seats before | Seats after | ± |
|---|---|---|---|---|---|---|
| Conservative | 3,914 | 67.7 | ▲1.3 | 4 | 3 | ▼1 |
| Independent | 1,868 | 32.3 | N/A | 0 | 3 | ▲3 |
| Liberal Democrats | N/A | | | 2 | 0 | ▼2 |
| Turnout | 6,190 | 37.0 | | | | |
| Electorate | 4,496 | | | | | |

=== Waltham Abbey Town Council ===
Made up of five wards (High Beach, Honey Lane, North East, Paternoster, and South West), only two wards saw contested elections - Paternoster and South West, hence the low low turnout.

Overall parish results
| Party | Vote | % | ± | Seats before | Seats after | ± |
|---|---|---|---|---|---|---|
| Conservative | 1,322 | 64.4 | ▼1.1 | 10 | 11 | ▲1 |
| Labour | 306 | 15.0 | ▲8.3 | 0 | 0 | Steady |
| Green | 242 | 11.8 | ▼3.6 | 1 | 0 | ▼1 |
| Independent | 181 | 8.8 | N/A | 0 | 0 | Steady |
| Turnout | 2,051 | | | 11 | 11 | |
