= List of people from Workington =

This is a list of notable people who were born in or have been residents of Workington, a coastal town and civil parish at the mouth of the River Derwent on the west coast in the Cumberland district of Cumbria, England.

== Arts and academics ==
- Troy Donockley (born 1964), Workington born player of uilleann pipes, a member of Nightwish
- Kathleen Ferrier Order of the British Empire (1912–1953) won the prestigious Gold Cup at the 1938 Workington Musical Festival.
- Arthur Guirdham (1905–1992), physician, psychiatrist, novelist and author, wrote on the Cathar sect, alternative medicine, extrasensory perception and reincarnation.
- Tom Iredale (1880–1972), ornithologist and malacologist
- Percy Kelly (1918–1993), Workington-born artist, best known for his watercolours and charcoal paintings of the Lake District
- Gordon Preston (1925–2015), mathematician, was best known for his work on semigroups.
- Alan Tarney (born 1945), songwriter, producer and bassist for The Shadows.

== Business ==
- Paul Dale (born 1970) was the first chief technology officer appointed to the management board at ITV plc, the UK's largest commercial television network.

== Politics and diplomacy ==
- Dale Norman Campbell-Savours (born 1943), Labour politician and Member of Parliament (MP) for Workington in 1979–2001, now sits in the House of Lords. Before becoming an MP he was managing director of a watch-making business.
- Thomas Cape (1868–1947), Labour politician and Member of Parliament (MP) for Workington in 1918–1945
- Sir Thomas Anthony Cunningham (born 1952), known as Tony Cunningham, is a British Labour Party politician who was the Member of Parliament (MP) for Workington in 2001–2015.
- Sir Joseph Brian Donnelly (living), diplomat, was the son of a Workington steelworker, educated at Workington Grammar School and Oxford University.
- Sue Hayman, Baroness Hayman of Ullock (born 1962) is a British Labour politician and life peer. She was the Member of Parliament (MP) for Workington in 2015–2019.
- Mark Jenkinson, a Conservative politician and Member of Parliament (MP) for Workington since 2019
- Fred Peart (1914–1988), was Member of Parliament for Workington from 1945 to 1976. He was made a life peer in 1976 and served as Leader of the House of Lords and Lord Privy Seal.

== Sports ==
- Jonathon Woods (born 1889, date of death unknown), footballer
- Jim Brough (1903–1986), rugby union and rugby league English international player
- John Burridge (born 1951), goalkeeper
- Mark Cueto (born 1979), English international rugby union player
- Scott Dobie (born 1978), Carlisle United and Scotland international footballer
- Brian Edgar (born 1936), rugby league Great Britain international player
- Jon Roper (born 5 May 1976) was a professional rugby league footballer in the 1990s and 2000s.
- Sol Roper John Roper (born 1936), also known by the nickname Sol, was an English professional rugby league footballer in the 1950s and 1960s, who coached in the 1960s and 1970s.
- Bill Shankly (1913–1981), manager of Workington A.F.C.
- Malcolm Wilson (born 1956), rally driver and rally-team owner
- Brian Tinnion (born 11 June 1948): footballer for Workington FC; 98 appearances (24 goals) before signing with Wrexham appearing in 279 games; migrated to the Americas & played with Pele.

== War ==
- James Alexander Smith (1881–1968), Workington-born soldier of the 3rd Battalion, Border Regiment during World War I. Recipient of the Victoria Cross.
