= 1979 South West Hertfordshire by-election =

Parliamentary by-election for the British House of Commons constituency

- 13 December 1979

South West Hertfordshire constituency
- Turnout: 48.3% ▼31.4 pp
| | First party | Second party | Third party |
|---|---|---|---|
| | CON | LAB | LIB |
| Candidate | Richard Page | Susan Ann Reeves | Dane Clouston |
| Party | Conservative | Labour | Liberal |
| Popular vote | 17,031 | 10,259 | 8,752 |
| Percentage | 45.9% | 27.7% | 23.6% |
| Swing | ▼7.6 pp | ▼0.1 pp | ▲7.4 pp |
MP before election
Geoffrey Dodsworth
Conservative
Subsequent MP
Richard Page
Conservative

The 1979 South West Hertfordshire by-election was a parliamentary by-election held on 13 December 1979 for the British House of Commons constituency of South West Hertfordshire.

== Previous MP ==
The seat fell vacant when the constituency's Conservative Member of Parliament (MP), Geoffrey Hugh Dodsworth (born 7 June 1928) resigned due to ill health. On 24 October 1979 he was appointed Steward of the Chiltern Hundreds, a notional office of profit under the Crown, in order to vacate his Parliamentary seat.

He is an accountant, who had contested Don Valley in 1959 and Hartlepool in 1964. He had represented South West Hertfordshire from the February 1974 general election.

== Candidates ==
Six candidates were nominated. The list below is set out in descending order of the number of votes received at the by-election.

1. The Conservative candidate was Richard Lewis Page (born on 22 February 1941), a mechanical engineer and company director. He served previously as MP for Workington, between winning a 1976 by-election and being defeated at the 1979 general election. Page had also contested Workington in the February 1974 and October 1974 general elections, at the time represented by senior Labour cabinet minister, Fred Peart.

After winning this by-election he was a junior minister under John Major. He stepped down from the House of Commons at the 2005 general election.

2. Mrs Susan A. Reeves was the Labour candidate. She was a housewife and had worked as a child guidance officer, although by 1983 she was working as a teacher and speech therapist. She was born on 31 March 1943. She contested the Chelmsford constituency in the 1979 general election, Stevenage in 1983 and Suffolk Coastal in 1987.

3. The Liberal Party candidate was Dane S.C. Clouston, who in 1974 was a mature student and former banker. He was born in September 1938 and had contested the Newbury seat in the 1970, February 1974 and October 1974 general elections.

4. N.R. Jeskins was the Ecology Party candidate.

5. D.W. Bundy represented the Anti Common Market and Free Trade Party.

6. N.Q. Ffooks was an independent, using the ballot paper label "Father Christmas: support Southampton University Rag".

== Result ==
By-election 13 December 1979: South West Hertfordshire
| Party | Candidate | Votes | % | ±% |
|---|---|---|---|---|
| Conservative | Richard Page | 17,031 | 45.9 | ▼8.8 |
| Labour | Susan Ann Reeves | 10,259 | 27.7 | ▼0.1 |
| Liberal | Dane Clouston | 8,752 | 23.6 | ▲7.4 |
| Ecology | Nigel Jeskins | 602 | 1.6 | New |
| ACMFT | David Bundy | 288 | 0.8 | New |
| Independent | Nigel Ffooks | 143 | 0.4 | New |
| Majority | | 6,772 | 18.3 | ▼8.7 |
| Turnout | | 37,075 | 48.3 | ▼31.4 |
| Conservative hold | | Swing | ▼3.8 | |
| Registered electors | | 76,776 | | |

== See also ==
- South West Hertfordshire constituency
- List of United Kingdom by-elections
- United Kingdom by-election records
