= David Gauke =

British politician and solicitor (born 1971)

The Right Honourable Sir David Gauke
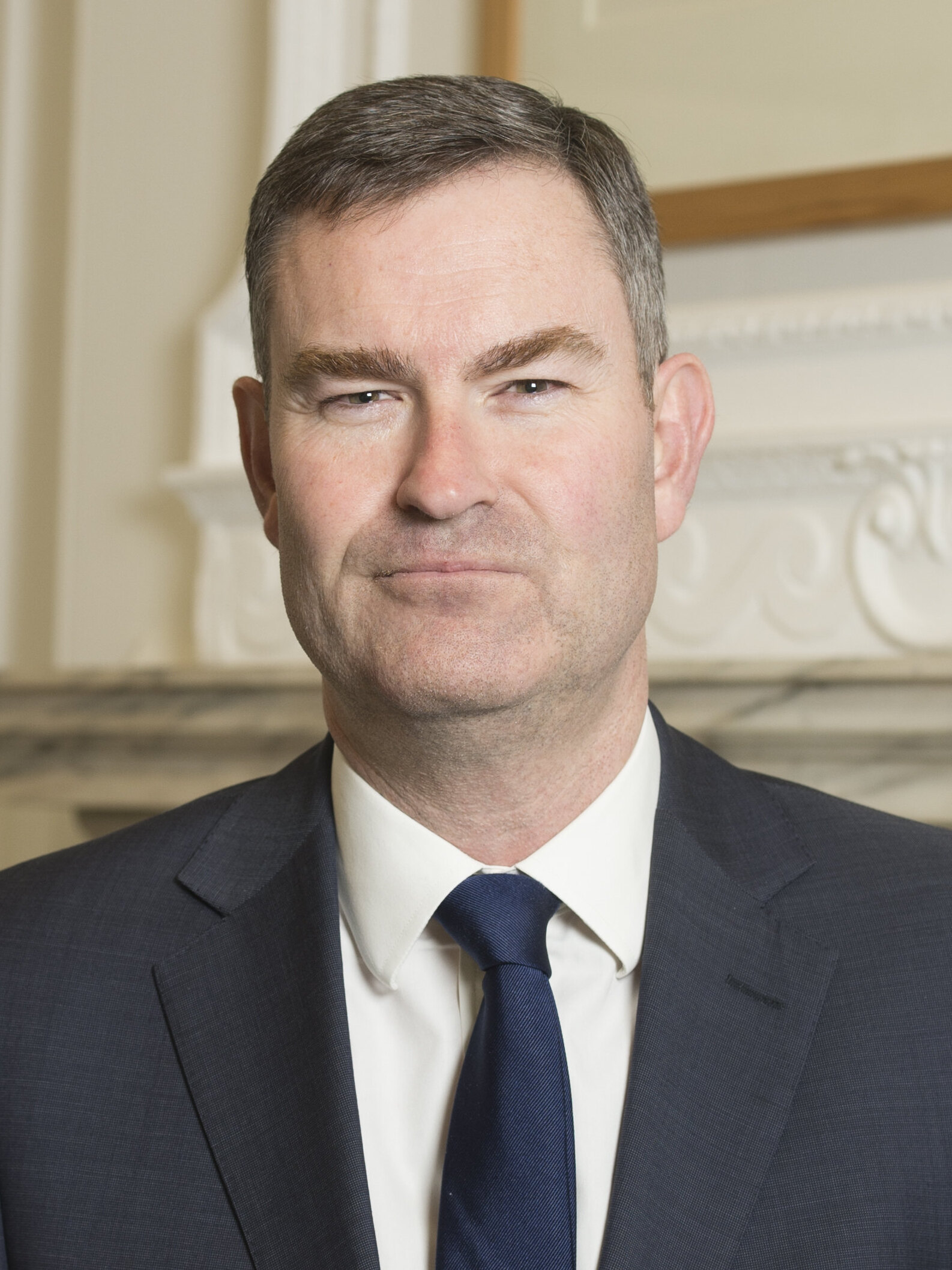
- Official portrait, 2018

Secretary of State for Justice; Lord Chancellor
- In office 8 January 2018 – 24 July 2019
- Prime Minister: Theresa May
- Preceded by: David Lidington
- Succeeded by: Robert Buckland

Secretary of State for Work and Pensions
- In office 11 June 2017 – 8 January 2018
- Prime Minister: Theresa May
- Preceded by: Damian Green
- Succeeded by: Esther McVey

Chief Secretary to the Treasury
- In office 14 July 2016 – 11 June 2017
- Prime Minister: Theresa May
- Chancellor: Philip Hammond
- Preceded by: Greg Hands
- Succeeded by: Liz Truss

Financial Secretary to the Treasury
- In office 15 July 2014 – 14 July 2016
- Prime Minister: David Cameron
- Preceded by: Nicky Morgan
- Succeeded by: Jane Ellison

Exchequer Secretary to the Treasury
- In office 13 May 2010 – 15 July 2014
- Prime Minister: David Cameron
- Preceded by: Sarah McCarthy-Fry
- Succeeded by: Priti Patel

Member of Parliament for South West Hertfordshire
- In office 5 May 2005 – 6 November 2019
- Preceded by: Richard Page
- Succeeded by: Gagan Mohindra

Personal details
- Born: David Michael Gauke; 8 October 1971 (age 55) Ipswich, Suffolk, England
- Party: Conservative (1990–2019, 2024–present)
- Other political affiliations: Independent (2019–2024)
- Spouse: Rachel Gauke
- Children: 3
- Education: St Edmund Hall, Oxford; University of Law

Sir David Michael Gauke (/ɡɔːk/; born 8 October 1971) is a British political commentator, solicitor, and former politician who was the Member of Parliament (MP) for South West Hertfordshire from 2005 to 2019. He served in the Cabinet under Theresa May, most notably as Secretary of State for Justice and Lord Chancellor from 2018 to 2019. First elected as a Conservative, Gauke had the Conservative whip removed on 3 September 2019 and until the dissolution sat as an independent politician.

Gauke served in the Cameron Government as Exchequer Secretary to the Treasury from 2010 to 2014 and Financial Secretary to the Treasury from 2014 to 2016. During the formation of the May Government in July 2016, he was appointed to the Cabinet as Chief Secretary to the Treasury, where he remained until being appointed Secretary of State for Work and Pensions in 2017. Gauke was appointed Secretary of State for Justice and Lord Chancellor in January 2018. He resigned on 24 July 2019 following the Conservative Party leadership election.

== Early life and career ==
Gauke was educated at Northgate High School in Ipswich, Suffolk. He read law at St Edmund Hall, Oxford and the College of Law in Chester, where he graduated in legal practice in 1995.

In 1993, he was a researcher for Barry Legg, the Conservative MP for Milton Keynes South West. He worked as a trainee solicitor with Richards Butler from 1995, being admitted as a solicitor in 1997. From 1999 to 2005, he was a solicitor in the financial services group at Macfarlanes, a corporate law firm. Gauke was elected as the vice-chairman of the Brent East Conservative Association for two years from 1998, and contested the seat at the 2001 general election finishing in second place 13,047 votes behind the Labour MP Paul Daisley.

== Parliamentary career ==
Gauke was elected to the House of Commons at the 2005 general election for Hertfordshire South West following the retirement of Richard Page. Gauke won the seat with a majority of 8,473, making his maiden speech on 9 June 2005. Between 2005 and 2008, he served as a member of the Procedure Select Committee. He was a member of the Treasury Select Committee between 2006 and 2007, before joining the Opposition front bench as Shadow Treasury Minister.

Following his re-election at the 2010 general election, he was appointed Exchequer Secretary to the Treasury.

In December 2013, Gauke was reported to HM Revenue and Customs after advertising an unpaid six-month "training post" at his constituency office in Rickmansworth, Hertfordshire. After four years in the post of Exchequer Secretary to the Treasury, where he was one of the principal architects of austerity, Gauke moved to become the Financial Secretary to the Treasury.

On 13 July 2016, Gauke was made a member of the Privy Council, giving him the style The Right Honourable. The following day, he was appointed Chief Secretary to the Treasury following the appointment of Theresa May to Prime Minister of the United Kingdom.

On 11 June 2017, Gauke was appointed Secretary of State for Work and Pensions, leaving the Treasury after seven years.

On 8 January 2018, Gauke succeeded David Lidington as Secretary of State for Justice and Lord Chancellor. He is the first solicitor to have held the post.

On 8 June 2019, following Gauke's "refusal to enact the commitments made in the Conservative manifesto" and his supporting the leadership candidacy of Rory Stewart in favour of persisting with May's withdrawal agreement, his constituency association wrote to all members calling a special meeting for a vote of no confidence.

On 20 July 2019, Gauke confirmed to The Sunday Times that he would resign as Secretary of State after Prime Minister's Questions on 24 July 2019, citing that he could not serve Boris Johnson as Prime Minister and run the risk of pursuing a no-deal exit from the European Union. Gauke and other similarly minded MPs became known in the media as the "Gaukeward Squad".

=== Expenses ===
Gauke claimed £10,248.32 in stamp duty and fees involved in the purchase of his second home in London, a flat. A Channel 4 Dispatches programme revealed that he was claiming expenses on the flat in central London despite having a property located only one hour away on public transport.

Gauke sold the flat in August 2012, keeping £27,000, the property price having increased by £67,000 since purchase. He paid nearly £40,000 of this to the Independent Parliamentary Standards Authority (IPSA) as MPs only have to pay back any profit made in the previous two years. He told the British public that negotiating a price discount with tradesmen for paying in cash for the purposes of evading tax is morally wrong.

=== Sitting as an independent ===
On 3 September 2019, Gauke joined 20 other rebel Conservative MPs to vote against the Conservative government of Boris Johnson. The rebel MPs voted with the Opposition to seize control of parliamentary business from the government, allowing the subsequent passage of the Benn act. The government had declared that voting against the original motion would be viewed as a matter of confidence in the government, as voting in favour of the motion would effectively be "destroying the government's negotiating position and handing control of parliament to Jeremy Corbyn." After voting against the government on a "confidence-issue," all 21 were advised that they had lost the Conservative whip, expelling them as Conservative MPs and requiring them to sit as independents. If they decided to run for re-election in a future election, the party would block their selection as Conservative candidates.

Gauke stood in his constituency as an independent candidate, and came second with 26% of the vote. The Conservative candidate won the seat with 49.6% of the vote and a majority of 14,408 votes.

== Post-Parliament ==
In May 2020, six months after leaving Parliament, it was announced that Gauke was re-joining Macfarlanes as their head of policy. He is also a political commentator and a columnist for the New Statesman where he writes about British and international politics from a liberal centrist perspective. On 15 May 2024, he appeared on The Rest Is Politics, substituting for Rory Stewart.In 2024, Gauke endorsed some Conservative candidates and some Independent MPs, such as James Bagge who stood against his former Cabinet colleague Liz Truss. He expressed support for Rejoin EU candidate in his constituency. In July 2024, he rejoined the Conservatives and called on centrist Conservatives to do the same.

In October 2024, it was confirmed that Prime Minister Sir Keir Starmer would appoint Gauke to lead an independent review into prison sentences.

In January 2026, Gauke alongside Andy Street, Amber Rudd and Ruth Davidson launched a movement called Prosper UK, aiming to bring the Conservative party back to the centre right.

== Personal life ==
Gauke is married to Rachel (née Rank), who was a professional support lawyer specialising in corporate tax at legal research provider LexisNexis. They have three sons and live in Chorleywood in Hertfordshire. He is a lifelong supporter of Ipswich Town F.C.

Parliament of the United Kingdom
Preceded by Richard Page	Member of Parliament for South West Hertfordshire; 2005–2019	Succeeded by Gagan Mohindra
Political offices
Preceded by Sarah McCarthy-Fry	Exchequer Secretary to the Treasury; 2010–2014	Succeeded by Priti Patel
Preceded by Nicky Morgan	Financial Secretary to the Treasury; 2014–2016	Succeeded by Jane Ellison
Preceded by Greg Hands	Chief Secretary to the Treasury; 2016–2017	Succeeded by Liz Truss
Preceded by Damian Green	Secretary of State for Work and Pensions; 2017–2018	Succeeded by Esther McVey
Preceded by David Lidington	Secretary of State for Justice; 2018–2019	Succeeded by Robert Buckland
Preceded by David Lidington	Lord High Chancellor of Great Britain; 2018–2019	Succeeded by Robert Buckland
