= PSL =

PSL or psl may refer to:

== Sport ==
- Pakistan Super League, a Twenty20 cricket league
- Palau Soccer League, the top division association football league in Palau
- Pilipinas Super League, a professional basketball league
- Philippine Super Liga, a defunct professional volleyball league
- Philippine Swimming League
- Premier Soccer League, South Africa
- Premier Squash League, England

== Business ==
- Personal seat license, entitlement for sports season tickets
- Personal Stop Loss
- Process Specification Language

== Computing ==
- Portable Standard Lisp
- Probabilistic soft logic
- Profile Scripting Language
- Property Specification Language
- Public Suffix List

== Organizations ==
- Party for Socialism and Liberation, an American political party
- Pioneer Square Labs, an American startup studio
- Polish People's Party (Polish: Polskie Stronnictwo Ludowe)
- Productora de Software, a Colombian software company
- Paris Sciences et Lettres University
- Social Liberal Party (Brazil) (Portuguese: Partido Social Liberal)
- Social Liberal Party (Moldova) (Romanian: Partidul Social Liberal)
- Social Liberal Party (Tunisia) (French: Parti social-libéral)

== Places ==
- Port St. Lucie, United States
- Port Sunlight railway station, England (National Rail code: PSL)
- Perth Airport (Scotland) (IATA code: PSL)

== Science and technology ==
- Photostimulated luminescence

=== Linguistics ===
- Pakistan Sign Language
- Plains Indian Sign Language
- Proto-Slavic language, abbreviated PSl. with a lowercase L
- Puerto Rican Sign Language (ISO 639-3 code: psl)

== Other uses ==
- Pumpkin spice latte, an autumnal coffee drink
- Parallel strand lumber
- Pasadena Short Line
- Professional support lawyer
- PSL (rifle), Romania
- PSL scale, a male physical attractiveness scale associated with looksmaxxing
- PSL_{n}, the projective special linear group

== See also ==
- Psi (disambiguation)
