= 1976 Workington by-election =

UK by-election

← Oct. 1974	4 November 1976	1979 →

Constituency of Workington
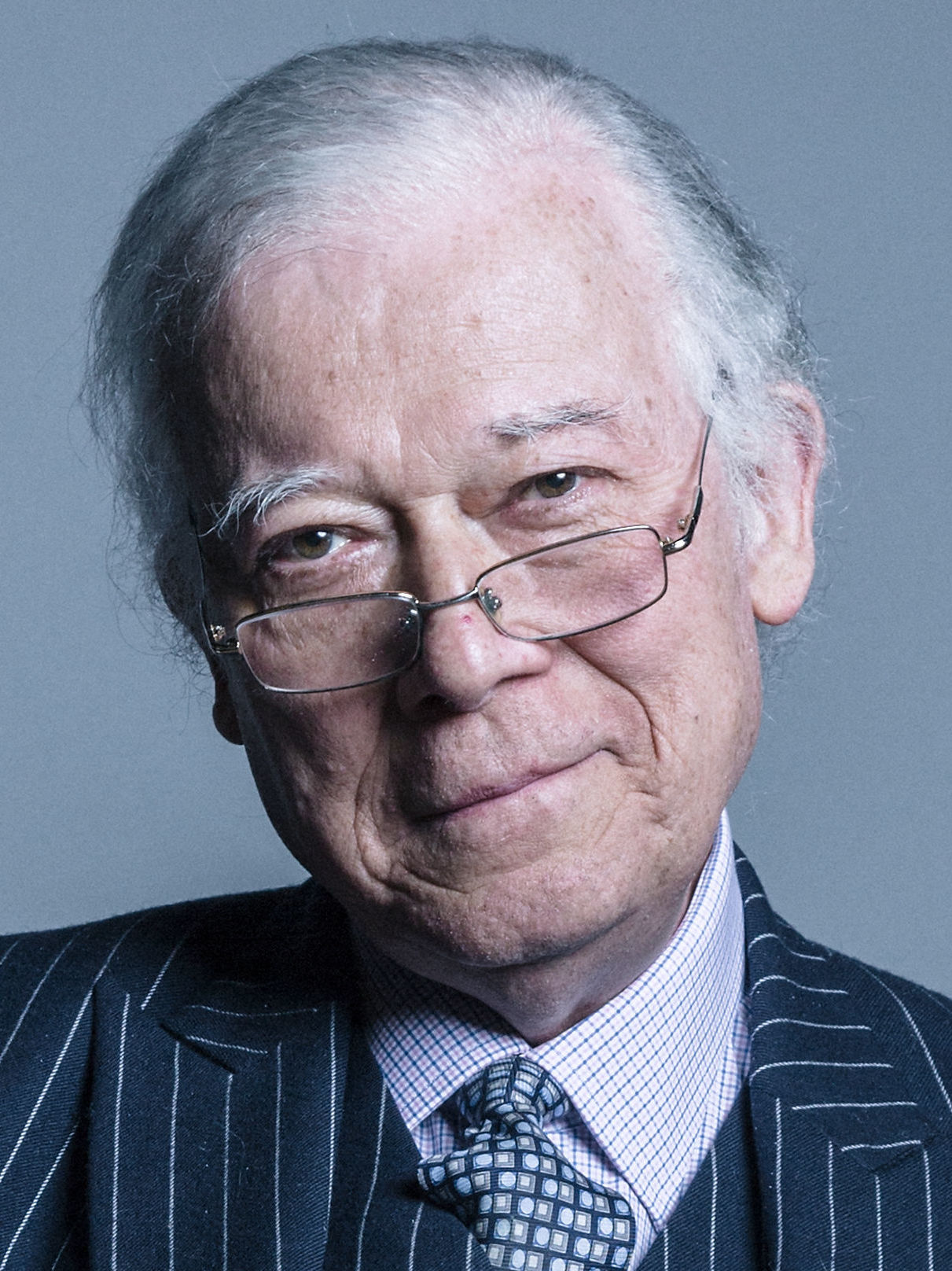
	First party	Second party	Third party
	Con		Lib
Candidate	Richard Page	Dale Campbell-Savours	Bernard Wates
Party	Conservative	Labour	Liberal
Popular vote	19,396	18,331	2,480
Percentage	48.2%	45.6%	6.2%
Swing	▲15.9%	▼10.4%	▼5.6%
MP before election
Fred Peart
Labour
Elected MP
Richard Page
Conservative

The 1976 Workington by-election was a parliamentary by-election held in England for the House of Commons constituency of Workington in Cumbria on 4 November 1976. It was won by the Conservative Party candidate Richard Page, who became the first non-Labour MP in the constituency’s history.

== Vacancy ==
The seat had become vacant when the Labour Member of Parliament (MP), Fred Peart had been elevated to the peerage in order to serve as Leader of the House of Lords and Lord Privy Seal. He had held the seat since the 1945 general election, and had served in previous Cabinets under Harold Wilson and James Callaghan.

== Candidates ==
The Labour candidate was 33-year-old Dale Campbell-Savours, the Managing Director of a clock company who had fought Darwen in both the February and October elections of 1974.

The Conservative Party candidate was Richard Page, who was 35 and had contested the Workington seat against Peart in both 1974 general elections.

== Result ==
The result was a surprise victory for Page and the Conservatives, with a majority of 1,065 votes. Workington had been a safe Labour seat, held even in the landslide defeat of 1931.

Both the main contenders in this by-election would go on to long Parliamentary careers. Campbell-Savours defeated Page for the Workington seat at the 1979 election, and would represent it until standing down at the 2001 election, when he was elevated to the Lords.

After his defeat, Page soon returned to the House of Commons at a 1979 by-election for the constituency of South West Hertfordshire, which he would represent until the 2005 election.

== Votes ==
Workington by-election, 1976
Party	Candidate	Votes	%	±%
Conservative	Richard Page	19,396	48.2	+15.9
Labour	Dale Campbell-Savours	18,331	45.6	−10.4
Liberal	Bernard Wates	2,480	6.2	−5.6
Majority		1,065	2.6	N/A
Turnout		40,207		
Conservative gain from Labour		Swing	+13.2	

== Previous election ==
General election October 1974: Workington
Party	Candidate	Votes	%	±%
Labour	Fred Peart	22,539	56.0	−3.7
Conservative	Richard Page	12,988	32.3	−8.0
Liberal	J. Burns	4,728	11.7	New
Majority		9,551	23.7	+4.4
Turnout		40,255	75.8	−0.6
Labour hold		Swing	+2.2	

== See also ==
- Workington constituency
- List of United Kingdom by-elections (1950-1979)
- 2017 Copeland by-election
