= 2014 Epping Forest District Council election =

2014 UK local government election

- 22 May 2014

19 of 58 seats on Epping Forest District Council 30 seats needed for a majority
- Turnout: 36.0% (▲6.0%)
	First party	Second party	Third party
Leader	Chris Whitbread	Caroline Pond	Jon Whitehouse
Party	Conservative	Loughton Residents	Liberal Democrats
Leader's seat	Epping Lindsey & Thornwood Common	Loughton St. John's	Epping Hemnall
Last election	39 seats, 43.7%	12 seats, 18.1%	4 seats, 13.2%
Seats before	38	12	4
Seats won	37	12	3
Seat change	▼2	Steady	▼1
Popular vote	9,725	4,163	2,945
Percentage	37.3%	16.0%	11.3%
Swing	▼6.4%	▼1.9%	▼1.9%
	Fourth party	Fifth party	Sixth party
Leader	Rod Butler	Peter Gode	Steven Neville
Party	UKIP	Labour	Green
Leader's seat	Waltham Abbey Honey Lane	Shelley	Buckhurst Hill East
Last election	0 seats, 2.0%	1 seat, 13.2%	0 seats, 3.0%
Seats before	1	1	0
Seats won	2	1	1
Seat change	▲2	Steady	▲1
Popular vote	3,764	2,089	1,944
Percentage	14.4%	8.0%	7.4%
Swing	▲12.4%	▼5.2%	▲4.4%
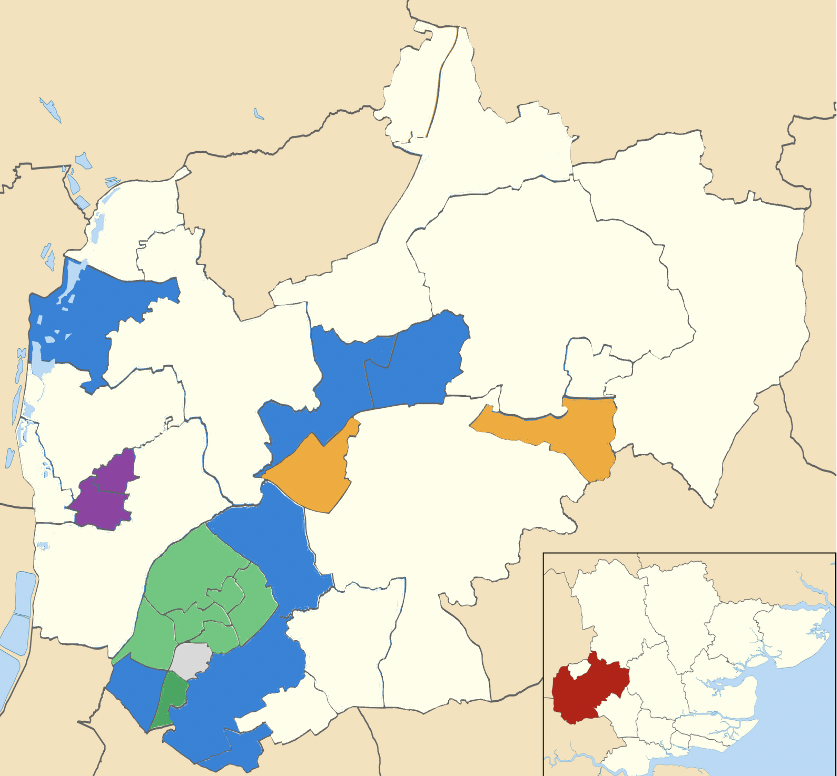
- Results of the 2014 District Council elections

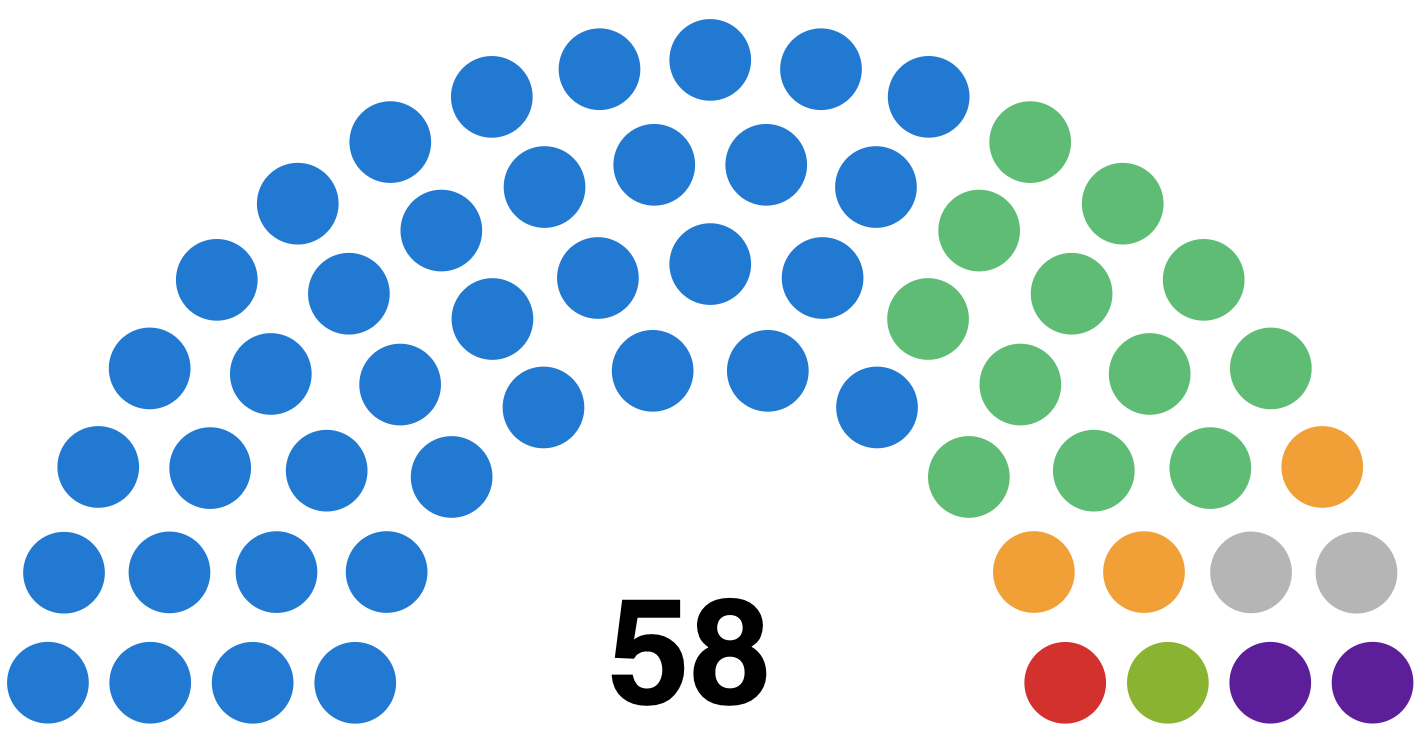
- Council composition following the election
Council control before election
Conservative
Council control after election
Conservative

The 2014 Epping Forest District Council election took place on 22 May 2014 to elect members of Epping Forest District Council in England. This was on the same day as other local elections and the European Parliament elections.

== By-elections ==
=== Waltham Abbey Honey Lane by-election ===
Waltham Abbey Honey Lane by-election, 2 May 2013
Party	Candidate	Votes	%	±%
UKIP	Rod Butler	465	50.5	N/A
Conservative	Christine Jane Ball	455	48.5	–14.6
Majority		10	2.0	
Turnout		920	21.0	
UKIP gain from Conservative		Swing		

== Ward results ==
Detailed below are all of the candidates nominated to stand in each ward in the 2014 district election. Most figures are compared to the last time these seats were contested in any election cycle for the Epping Forest District Council election:

=== Buckhurst Hill East ===
Buckhurst Hill East
Party	Candidate	Votes	%	±%
Green	Steven Neville	635	41.1	+23.3
Conservative	Aniket Patel	574	37.4	–5.2
Liberal Democrats	Chris Greaves	210	13.7	–8.2
Labour	Pamela Griffin	115	7.5	–9.9
Majority		61	4.0	N/A
Turnout		1,534	44.0	
Green gain from Liberal Democrats		Swing		

=== Buckhurst Hill West ===
Buckhurst Hill West
Party	Candidate	Votes	%	±%
Conservative	Sylvia Watson	1,136	61.4	+14.5
Green	Roger Neville	279	15.1	+9.0
Liberal Democrats	Garry Sadler	219	11.8	–19.1
Labour	Andrew Forsey	178	9.6	+1.7
Young People's	Gerard Mark Wadsworth	37	2.0	N/A
Majority		857	46.3	
Turnout		1,849	35.0	
Conservative hold		Swing		

=== Chigwell Village ===
Chigwell Village
Party	Candidate	Votes	%	±%
Conservative	Lesley Wagland	682	62.4	–1.3
UKIP	Kane Khan	187	17.1	–1.7
Labour	Isuru Perera	123	11.3	+1.2
Green	Christopher Lord	63	5.8	+0.5
Liberal Democrats	George Lund	38	3.5	+1.1
Majority		495	45.3	
Turnout		1,093	33.0	
Conservative hold		Swing		

=== Chipping Ongar, Greensted & Marden Ash ===
Chipping Ongar, Greensted & Marden Ash
Party	Candidate	Votes	%	±%
Liberal Democrats	Brian Surtees	421	29.5	–1.9
Conservative	Nigel Bedford	413	28.9	–13.9
UKIP	Michael McGough	411	28.8	N/A
Green	Nicola Harris	148	10.4	+4.1
English Democrat	Robin Tilbrook	36	2.5	–7.0
Majority		8	0.5	
Turnout		1,429	41.0	
Liberal Democrats hold		Swing		

=== Epping Hemnall ===
Epping Hemnall
Party	Candidate	Votes	%	±%
Liberal Democrats	Janet Whitehouse	847	42.5	–6.8
UKIP	Andrew Smith	511	25.6	+12.0
Conservative	Jonathan Kent	420	21.1	–5.8
Labour	Lorraine Collier	128	6.4	–3.8
Green	Anne Widdup	87	4.4	N/A
Majority		336	16.9	
Turnout		1,993	40.0	
Liberal Democrats hold		Swing		

=== Epping Lindsay & Thornwood Common ===
Epping Lindsay & Thornwood Common
Party	Candidate	Votes	%	±%
Conservative	William Breare-Hall	719	37.6	–16.7
UKIP	Barbara Robertson	566	29.6	N/A
Liberal Democrats	Ingrid Black	267	14.0	+5.3
Labour	Simon Bullough	232	12.1	–15.5
Green	William Hartington	130	6.8	–2.6
Majority		153	8.0	
Turnout		1,914	38.0	
Conservative hold		Swing		

=== Grange Hill ===
Grange Hill
Party	Candidate	Votes	%	±%
Conservative	Gagan Mohindra	815	54.4	–6.6
Green	Alison Lord	355	23.7	N/A
Liberal Democrats	Pesh Kapasiawala	328	21.9	+5.1
Majority		460	30.7	
Turnout		1,498	30.0	
Conservative hold		Swing		

=== Loughton Alderton ===
Loughton Alderton
Party	Candidate	Votes	%	±%
Loughton Residents	Chris Roberts	643	57.8	+0.7
Conservative	Chris Criscione	194	17.4	+2.4
Labour	Angela Ayre	147	13.2	–0.9
Independent	Paul Morris	105	9.4	–0.4
Liberal Democrats	Bhupendra Patel	24	2.2	+1.1
Majority		449	40.4	
Turnout		1,113	33.0	
Loughton Residents hold		Swing		

=== Loughton Broadway ===
Loughton Broadway
Party	Candidate	Votes	%	±%
Loughton Residents	Chris Pond	423	41.1	–10.1
UKIP	Barry Johns	357	34.7	N/A
Labour	Margaret Owen	157	14.3	+0.4
Conservative	Robert Luchford	102	9.9	–3.4
Majority		66	6.3	
Turnout		1,039	32.0	
Loughton Residents hold		Swing		

=== Loughton Fairmead ===
Loughton Fairmead
Party	Candidate	Votes	%	±%
Loughton Residents	Louise Mead	523	50.4	–3.5
UKIP	Ronald McEvoy	262	25.3	N/A
Conservative	Ryan Sparrowhawk	153	14.8	+0.4
Labour	Ben Spencer	99	9.6	–9.9
Majority		261	25.1	
Turnout		1,037	31.0	
Loughton Residents hold		Swing		

=== Loughton Forest ===
Loughton Forest
Party	Candidate	Votes	%	±%
Loughton Residents	Sharon Weston	755	55.7	+11.7
Conservative	Andrew Kovler	488	36.0	–14.0
Labour	Janice Cooke	74	5.5	+1.1
Liberal Democrats	Elonor Spencer	38	2.8	+1.6
Majority		267	19.7	
Turnout		1,355	40.0	
Loughton Residents hold		Swing		

=== Loughton Roding ===
Loughton Roding
Party	Candidate	Votes	%	±%
Independent	Stephen Murray	1,207	81.5	+18.1
Conservative	Joanne Share-Bernia	164	11.1	–10.1
Labour	Tom Owen	59	4.0	–11.4
Green	Benjamin Wille	50	3.4	N/A
Majority		1,043	70.4	
Turnout		1,480	42.0	
Independent hold		Swing		

=== Loughton St. John's ===
Loughton St John's
Party	Candidate	Votes	%	±%
Loughton Residents	Bob Jennings	904	69.8	+7.4
Conservative	Neil Cohen	274	21.2	–5.4
Labour	Jill Bostock	93	7.2	–0.4
Liberal Democrats	Enid Robinson	29	2.1	N/A
Majority		630	48.6	
Turnout		1,295	38.0	
Loughton Residents hold		Swing		

=== Loughton St. Mary's ===
Loughton St. Mary's
Party	Candidate	Votes	%	±%
Loughton Residents	Howard Kauffman	915	67.1	+17.0
Conservative	Ivan Kovler	316	23.2	–15.1
Labour	Laurence Morter	103	7.6	+0.6
Liberal Democrats	Enid Robinson	29	2.1	N/A
Majority		599	43.9	
Turnout		1,363	37.0	
Loughton Residents hold		Swing		

=== Lower Nazeing ===
Lower Nazeing
Party	Candidate	Votes	%	±%
Conservative	Yolanda Knight	806	69.0	–0.4
Green	Barry Phillips	197	16.9	+12.3
Labour	Kelvin Morris	165	14.1	–1.5
Majority		609	52.1	
Turnout		1,168	36.0	
Conservative hold		Swing		

=== North Weald Bassett ===
North Weald Bassett
Party	Candidate	Votes	%	±%
Conservative	David Stallan	744	58.8	–17.8
UKIP	Paul Stevens	438	34.6	N/A
Liberal Democrats	Arnold Verrall	83	6.6	–1.5
Majority		306	24.2	
Turnout		1,265	34.0	
Conservative hold		Swing		

=== Theydon Bois ===
Theydon Bois
Party	Candidate	Votes	%	±%
Conservative	Susan Jones	898	70.4	+29.9
Liberal Democrats	Annie Wood	378	29.6	–11.3
Majority		520	40.8	
Turnout		1,276	40.0	
Conservative hold		Swing		

=== Waltham Abbey Honey Lane ===
Waltham Abbey Honey Lane
Party	Candidate	Votes	%	±%
UKIP	Rod Butler	604	44.7	N/A
Conservative	Sam Kane	499	36.9	–30.9
Labour	Joanna Skinner	248	18.4	–2.4
Majority		105	7.7	
Turnout		1,351	29.0	
UKIP gain from Conservative		Swing		

=== Waltham Abbey Paternoster ===
Waltham Abbey Paternoster
Party	Candidate	Votes	%	±%
UKIP	David Dorrell	428	44.7	N/A
Conservative	Jodie Lucas	328	34.2	–28.8
Labour	Robert Grayson	168	17.5	–9.5
Liberal Democrats	Phil Chadburn	34	3.6	–6.4
Majority		100	10.4	
Turnout		958	28.0	
UKIP gain from Conservative		Swing		
