= Tom Stephenson (trade unionist) =

British trade unionist

Tom Stephenson (27 April 1895 – 3 December 1962) was a British trade unionist.

Born in Moresby, near Whitehaven, Stephenson left school at the age of fourteen and followed his father in working at the Walkmill Colliery. Inspired by Tom Cape and various socialist speakers, Stephenson joined the Independent Labour Party (ILP) and became active in the Cumberland Miners' Association (CMA).

Stephenson rose to prominence during a lock-out of miners in 1921, and was also a leading figure in a fifteen-week strike in 1923. During the UK general strike, he called for the nationalisation of the mines. In August 1926, he was convicted of intimidating strikebreakers and was sentences to one month of hard labour. He was elected as a Labour Party member of Whitehaven Town Council in 1923. He supported the ILP disaffiliating from the Labour Party in 1932, although he stated that he would have supported them remaining if the ILP had been allowed to organise in Parliament.

Following the disaffiliating, Stephenson was chosen as the North East representative on the ILP's National Administrative Council. He was consistently re-elected to Ennerdale Rural District Council, and he was selected as the ILP candidate for Whitehaven at the 1935 general election. However, he took only 3.3% of the votes cast and, although he remained loyal to the ILP, he began to focus his work in the labour movement.

Stephenson was elected as financial secretary of the CMA in 1935, then when Cape retired, he became general secretary, moving to Workington. He was elected to the national executive of the Miners' Federation of Great Britain in 1939, where he was the leading proponent of strikes during World War II. Within the ILP, he was criticised for supporting armed support for the Soviet Union. He stood down from its national council in 1942, and left the party in about 1946, his wife paying his membership to the Labour Party. He remained known as a militant trade unionist until he retired in 1960. Shortly after, he suffered the first of several strokes, and died in 1962.

Trade union offices
Preceded by Tom Cape	General Secretary of the Cumberland Miners' Association c.1939 – 1960	Succeeded by Maurice Rowe
Party political offices
Preceded by Fred Tait	North East representative on the National Administrative Council of the Independent Labour Party; 1932–1942	Succeeded by Norman Winters
