= Fred Tait =

Frederick Tait (born 27 November 1893) was a British socialist activist.

Born in Elswick, near Newcastle-upon-Tyne, Tait was educated at Shipcote Boys' School in Gateshead, and then at the City of Leeds Training College, following which he became an assistant schoolteacher. From 1923 until 1926, Tait chaired the Gateshead Higher Education Committee, and in his spare time, he lectured for the Workers' Educational Association.

Tait's father was a trade unionist, and Tait was inspired by him to join the Independent Labour Party (ILP). In line with the majority of the ILP, he opposed World War I. As a conscientious objector, he was imprisoned, kept in solitary confinement, and compelled to sew mailbags. In 1922, he became the chair of the Gateshead ILP, then the following year was chair of the Gateshead Labour Party, to which the ILP was affiliated. This brought him to greater prominence, standing unsuccessfully for the Labour Party in Penrith and Cockermouth at the 1924 United Kingdom general election, then from 1925 serving as the North East representative on the ILP's National Administrative Committee. During this period, he wrote several pamphlets, including "What do you Lack?", and "Socialism and Wealth Distribution".

By 1932, the ILP and the Labour Party were in conflict, but a conference of the North East Division of the ILP voted to try to resolve the problems. Tait believed that the ILP should disaffiliate from the Labour Party without attempting to resolve the disagreements, and stood down as the region's representative.

Tait was also a supporter of social credit, and spent the mid-1930s championing the theory. His daughter, Margaret, later married Lyall Wilkes, who became a Labour Member of Parliament in 1945.

Party political offices
Preceded by Jack Lees	North East representative on the National Administrative Council of the Independent Labour Party; 1925–1932	Succeeded by Tom Stephenson
