= Richard Page (politician) =

British politician

Parliamentary Under-Secretary of State for Trade and Industry
- In office 14 February 1995 – 2 May 1997
- Prime Minister: John Major
- Preceded by: Charles Wardle
- Succeeded by: Nigel Griffiths

Member of Parliament for South West Hertfordshire
- In office 13 December 1979 – 11 April 2005
- Preceded by: Geoffrey Dodsworth
- Succeeded by: David Gauke

Member of Parliament for Workington
- In office 4 November 1976 – 7 April 1979
- Preceded by: Fred Peart
- Succeeded by: Dale Campbell-Savours

Personal details
- Born: 22 February 1941 (age 85) Tredegar, Wales
- Party: Conservative
- Spouse: Madeleine Ann Brown
- Education: University of Bedfordshire

Richard Lewis Page (born 22 February 1941) is a former Conservative Member of Parliament (MP) in the United Kingdom from 1976 to 1979, and from 1979 to 2005.

== Early life ==
Born the son of Victor Charles Page, he went to the independent Hurstpierpoint College in West Sussex and Luton Technical College, gaining a HNC in Mechanical Engineering in 1962. He was an apprentice at Vauxhall Motors in Luton from 1959 to 1963, and then worked for Page Holdings, becoming the Chairman from 1985 to 1995 and 1997 onwards.

He was member of the Young Conservatives from 1964 to 1966 and a district councillor in Banstead, Surrey, from 1968 to 1971.

== Parliamentary career ==
Page contested Workington in the February and October 1974 elections. He won the seat in the by-election caused by the elevation of Labour's Fred Peart to the House of Lords in 1976, becoming the first Conservative to represent the constituency since it was created in 1918, before losing the seat in May 1979. Page re-entered Parliament shortly afterwards, when he won the safe Conservative seat of South West Hertfordshire in a by-election in December that year. He is therefore distinguished as one of a handful of MPs who have been successful in two by-elections.

Page twice served as Private Parliamentary Secretary to John Biffen–firstly whilst Biffen was Secretary of State for Trade from 1981 to 1982; and later during his stint as Leader of the House from 1983 to 1987. Page was the Parliamentary Under-Secretary of State at the Department of Trade and Industry under John Major, with responsibility for small business, Sustainable energy, biotechnology, coal, oil; as well as British Nuclear Fuels Ltd, the UK's nationalised nuclear power corporation. He was the opposition front-bench spokesman on Trade and Industry from 2000 to 2001.

He was the lead minister in the privatisation of AEA Technology, and used his knowledge of the private members' ballot procedure to be successful with two private members' bills from the single private members' ballot slot. Page moved a 10-minute rule bill to reduce the number of MPs, claiming it could allow MPs to be better paid and save the state money.

Page was a Member of the Public Accounts Committee in the years 1987-95 and 1997–2000. He was also the Vice-Chairman of: the Conservative Trade and Industry Committee from 1988 to 1995; the All Party Engineering Group from 1997 to 2005; and the All Party Chemistry Group from 1997 to 2005. He was the Joint Chairman of the All-Party Racing and Bloodstock Committee from 1998 to 2005 and Chairman of the All Party Parliamentary Scientific Committee from 2003 to 2005. He was also International Chairman of the Conservative's Central Office from 1999 to 2000 and the Governor of the Foundation for Western Democracy from 1998 to 2000.

Outside of high office, Page won the Lords and Commons Motor car race at Brands Hatch and Donnington on three occasions. He was one of only 13 Conservative MPs who spoke and voted against the decision to invade Iraq (18 March 2003) and the way the re-construction progressed. He stepped down from the House of Commons at the 2005 General Election due to his wife's ill health.

== Later life ==
He was Governor of the Royal Masonic School from 1984 to 1995 and from 1999 to 2013. He was Honorary Treasurer of The Leukaemia Research Fund from 1991 to 1995, and has been Chairman of Keep Southwater Green since 2015. He was the master of the Worshipful Company of Pattenmakers.

Parliament of the United Kingdom
| Preceded by Fred Peart | Member of Parliament for Workington; 1976–1979 | Succeeded by Dale Campbell-Savours |
| Preceded by Geoffrey Dodsworth | Member of Parliament for South West Hertfordshire; 1979–2005 | Succeeded by David Gauke |
