= Gilbert Longden =

Sir Gilbert James Morley Longden (16 April 1902 – 16 October 1997) was a British Conservative politician.

He was educated at Haileybury and at Emmanuel College, Cambridge.

He qualified as a solicitor in 1924 and in 1939 enrolled in the Army Officers Emergency Reserve and in 1940 became an officer in the Durham Light Infantry. He was appointed ADC to the Commander 2nd Division in India and then Deputy Assistant Adjutant General 36 Division in Burma.

He fought Morpeth unsuccessfully in 1945 and then served as Member of Parliament for South West Hertfordshire from 1950 until his retirement in February 1974. He was one of the last surviving members of the One Nation Group of Conservative Members of Parliament, who included Harold Macmillan, Rab Butler, Enoch Powell, Edward Heath, Iain Macleod and Angus Maude.

Famously, when Macmillan sacked a third of his Cabinet on what was known as "The Night of the Long Knives", Longden the next day said "May I congratulate the Prime Minister on having kept his head when all around were losing theirs" - the opposition collapsed in laughter.

He was a strong believer in the European Union and a great supporter of the Commonwealth, and was chairman of the all party British-Israel Committee at a time when support for Israel was rare on the Conservative benches.

Parliament of the United Kingdom
New constituency	Member of Parliament for Hertfordshire South West; 1950 – February 1974	Succeeded by Geoffrey Dodsworth
