= Andrew Sharp (trade unionist) =

Andrew Sharp (26 April 1841 – 14 October 1919) was a British trade unionist.

Born in Ellenport, near Maryport in Cumberland, Sharp's father died when he was just over one year old, and he was brought up by his mother, helping financially by working in agriculture from an early age. He worked full-time as a pony driver in a coal mine from the age of ten, graduating to cut coal underground at eighteen.

Sharp educated himself and became an active trade unionist, but was victimised as a result, and had to relocate to County Durham to find work. However, he returned to Cumberland in 1872, and that year attended the Amalgamated Association of Miners' conference. Sharp was inspired to form the Cumberland Miners' Association (CMA) and affiliated it to the AAM; by 1874, it had 1,500 members, and he worked as its general secretary and full-time agent.

Under Sharp's leadership, the CMA won an important strike, solidifying its position, and he supported the formation of the Miners' Federation of Great Britain (MFGB), serving on its executive on several occasions. Long a supporter of the Liberal Party, he was elected to Cumberland County Council on its formation, and also served on Maryport Urban District Council. He followed the MFGB in switching his support to the emerging Labour Party, and stood unsuccessfully for it in Whitehaven at the January 1910 general election, with the financial backing of the Whitehaven Trades Council.

Sharp retired in 1916, the union granting him a pension of one pound a week. He died three years later, in 1919.

Trade union offices
| Preceded by New position | General Secretary of the Cumberland Miners' Association; 1872–1916 | Succeeded by Thomas Cape |
