= Cumberland Miners' Association =

English trade union

The Cumberland Miners' Association was a trade union in the United Kingdom.

The union was founded in 1872 as the West Cumberland Miners' Association, with its aims being the establishment of an eight-hour day, and improved safety. In 1906, it removed "West" from its name. Never a large organisation, in 1910 it had 6,326 members, based in Whitehaven and Workington. Its executive became dominated by the Independent Labour Party, and it thereby came to have considerable influence in elections in the county, with most Labour Party candidates being union members.

In its early years, the union was a member of the Amalgamated Association of Miners; it later affiliated to the Miners Federation of Great Britain.

In 1945, the CMA became the Cumberland Area of the National Union of Mineworkers (NUM), with less autonomy than before. By the 1970s, it was the smallest area of the union, By the end of the miners' strike in 1985, its area contained only one pit and around 150 members. Later in the decade, it merged with the Lancashire Area of the NUM to form the North West Area.

== General Secretaries ==
1872: Andrew Sharp
1916: Thomas Cape
c. 1939: Tom Stephenson
1960: Maurice Rowe
c. 1975: Harry Hanlon
c. 1980: W. S. Proud

== See also ==
- Cumberland Iron Ore Miners' and Kindred Trades' Association
