= Tony Cunningham (politician) =

British Labour Party politician

Sir Tony Cunningham DL
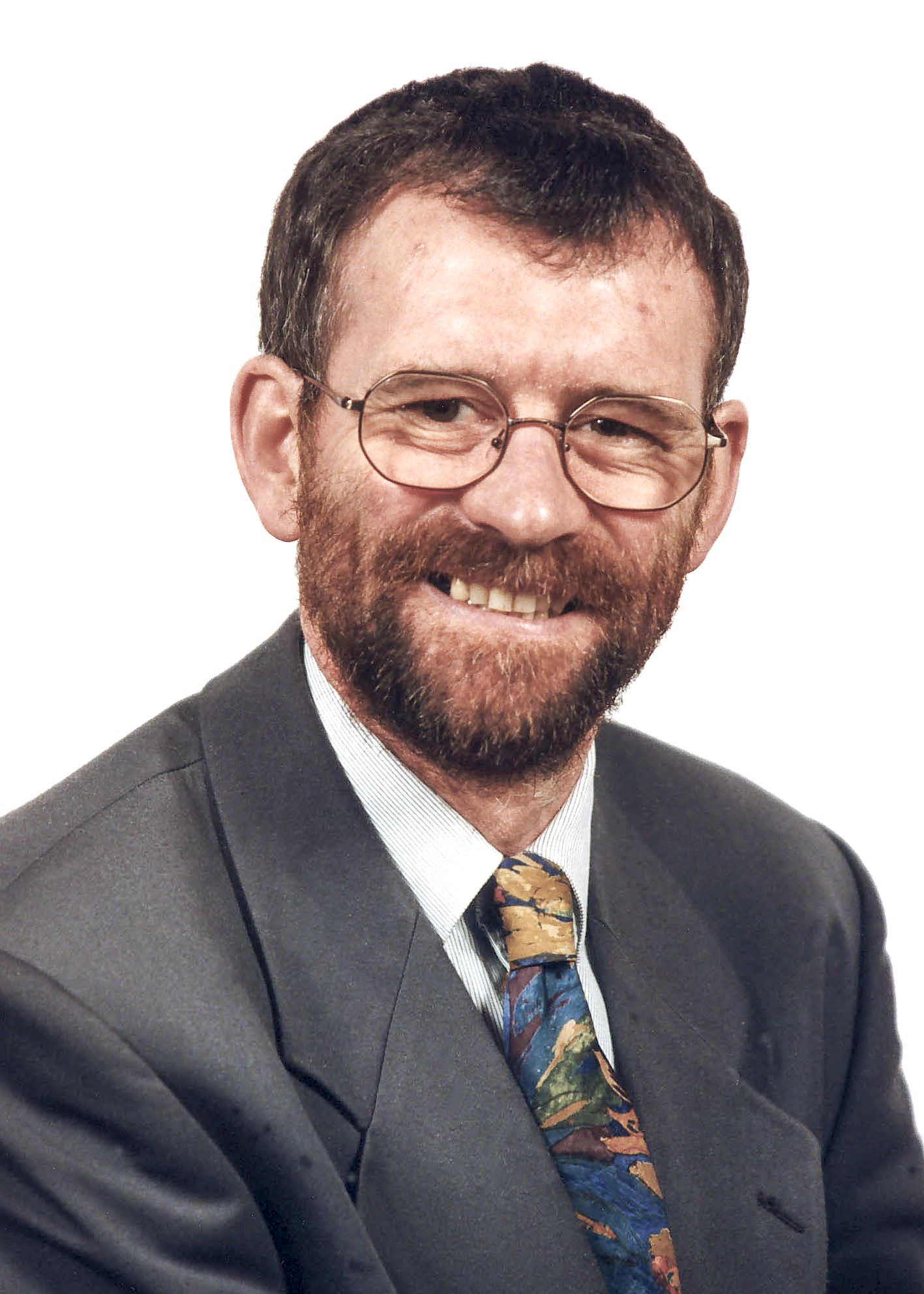
- Cunningham in 1994

Shadow Minister for International Development
- In office 7 October 2011 – 7 October 2013 Serving with Rushanara Ali
- Leader: Ed Miliband
- Preceded by: Mark Lazarowicz
- Succeeded by: Alison McGovern; Gavin Shuker

Lord Commissioner of the Treasury
- In office 5 October 2008 – 11 May 2010
- Prime Minister: Gordon Brown
- Preceded by: Alan Campbell
- Succeeded by: James Duddridge

Member of Parliament for Workington
- In office 7 June 2001 – 30 March 2015
- Preceded by: Dale Campbell-Savours
- Succeeded by: Sue Hayman

Member of the European Parliament for Cumbria and Lancashire North
- In office 1994–1999
- Preceded by: Richard Fletcher-Vane
- Succeeded by: Constituency abolished

Personal details
- Born: 16 September 1952 (age 73) Workington, Cumberland, England
- Party: Labour
- Spouse: Anne Margaret Gilmore (m. 1984)
- Children: 2
- Education: University of Liverpool; Manchester Metropolitan University

Sir Thomas Anthony Cunningham DL (born 16 September 1952) is a British politician who served as member of parliament (MP) for Workington from 2001 to 2015. A member of the Labour Party, he was Member of the European Parliament (MEP) for Cumbria and Lancashire North from 1994 to 1999.

Cunningham served in junior posts in the Blair and Brown governments from 2004 to 2010, and on Ed Miliband's opposition front bench from 2011 to 2013. Prior to his election to the European Parliament, he was Leader of Allerdale District Council from 1992 to 1994.

== Early life ==
Tony Cunningham was born in Workington and educated at the Workington Grammar School on Stainburn Road before attending the University of Liverpool where he received a BA degree in History and Politics in 1975, and the Didsbury College of Education, Manchester where he qualified as a teacher with a Postgraduate Certificate in Education in 1976.

He began his teaching career at the Alsager Comprehensive School on Hassall Road in 1976 until 1980 when he taught at the Mikunguni Trade School in Zanzibar. He returned to Britain in 1983 to teach history at Netherhall School, Maryport on Netherhall Road in Maryport and he remained in post until his election to the European Parliament. For the duration of his teaching career he was a member of the National Union of Teachers, serving as a local secretary 1985–1994, and has been a member of the Amalgamated Engineering and Electrical Union since 1993.

== Political career ==
=== Local government ===
He was elected a councillor to the Allerdale District Council in 1987, and became the leader of the council in 1992, he stepped down from both the leadership and the council in 1994. He was the Mayor of Workington in 1990.

=== European Parliament ===
At the 1994 European Parliament election he became the MEP for Cumbria and Lancashire North, but was defeated in 1999.

On leaving Strasbourg and Brussels in 1999 he became the Chief Executive of Human Rights NGO INDICT where he remained until his election to the House of Commons.

=== UK Parliament ===
At the 2001 general election, Cunningham was elected as member of parliament for Workington, succeeding Dale Campbell-Savours in the safe Labour seat. He made his maiden speech on 13 July 2001.

Cunningham was a member of the European Scrutiny Select Committee from 2001 until 2004, when he was appointed Parliamentary Private Secretary to DEFRA Minister Elliot Morley. He was promoted to an Assistant Whip after the 2005 general election, and served as a Lord Commissioner of the Treasury from the 2008 government reshuffle until Labour's election defeat in 2010.

He was knighted in the 2012 Birthday Honours for public and political service.

In 2012, opposition leader Ed Miliband appointed him to the front bench as a Shadow International Development Minister. He was removed from his role in the October 2013 reshuffle, and served on the International Development Select Committee from 2013 to 2015.

He was one of the few Labour MPs to vote against the Marriage (Same Sex Couples) Bill in 2013.

In June 2014, Cunningham announced that he would not be standing again at the next election.

== Personal life ==
Cunningham has been married to Anne Margaret Gilmore since 1984; he has a stepson, a stepdaughter, and a son and a daughter with his wife.

He is a deputy lieutenant of Cumbria, and has been a patron of both the Voluntary Service Overseas and Mines Advisory Group.

Cunningham is active in sports, he is a qualified rugby union coach and referee, and has played cricket and football, as well as rugby (both league and union) competitively. He played for the parliamentary football team, and he speaks some Swahili.

Parliament of the United Kingdom
Preceded by Dale Campbell-Savours	Member of Parliament for Workington; 2001–2015	Succeeded by Sue Hayman
