= Geoffrey Dodsworth =

- Born: 7 June 1928; York, Yorkshire
- Died: 29 March 2018 (aged 89)
- Occupation(s): Banker, politician
- Spouses: Isabel Neale; Elizabeth Beeston
- Children: 3

Geoffrey Hugh Dodsworth FCA (7 June 1928 – 29 March 2018) was a merchant banker and British Conservative Party politician.

== Biography ==
=== Early life ===
Geoffrey Hugh Dodsworth was born on 7 June 1928. He was educated at St. Peter's School, York.

=== Business career ===
He began his working life in 1945 as an articled clerk and subsequently a Chartered Accountant at Barron & Barron in York. After two years' service in the army, from 4 July 1946 to 26 August 1948, he returned to Barron & Barron, where he worked on a number of major business activities for large estates in Yorkshire and London until 1963. Whilst at Barron & Barron, Geoffrey also became Justice of the Peace for York in 1960 - at just 32, he was one of the youngest ever magistrates for the city.

He set up a group of companies in the export and import trade in 1963 and travelled extensively in Ottawa, New York and Washington, developing these businesses. In 1970, he joined William Brandt’s Sons & Co. Ltd. He became managing director of Grindlay Brandt’s Ltd. (a Merchant Bank), in 1974, and also in the same year became Director of Grindlays Bank Ltd. (now ANZ). Dodsworth made presentations on behalf of the UK leasing Industry with the British Export Council in the United States, Canada, Brazil, Iran and India. In 1980, he became president and co-Chief Executive of Oceanic Finance Corporation Ltd., based in Bermuda. He then moved on to become chairman and Chief Executive of Jorvik Finance Corporation Ltd., in Bermuda, in 1988, and set up Dodsworth and Company Ltd. in 1988, under personal control, specialising in equity and bank funding for asset and project finance. One of his biggest deals was negotiating the sale of a cable and telephone franchise to Cable & Wireless.

He was Director of a quoted Property Company for three years in the 1990s and worked with First International Shipping Corporation in the late 1990s. He was a Fellow of the Institute of Chartered Accountants in England and Wales, was chairman and founder of the UK Equipment Leasing Association and vice-chairman of the European Leasing Federation. He was a Freeman of the City of London and acted as Trustee on a number of Family Trusts.

=== Political career ===
Dodsworth twice stood unsuccessfully for Parliament before getting elected. In 1959 he was beaten at the safe-Labour Don Valley by Richard Kelley, and in 1964 he was defeated by Ted Leadbitter at The Hartlepools.

He became Deputy Leader of the Conservative Group on York City Council in 1964 and was a member of the council for six years, serving on major committees specialising in financial matters. He was Member of Parliament for South West Hertfordshire from February 1974, and was re-adopted for the 1979 election. He resigned as an MP in October 1979, on medical advice under severe pressure from a considerable proportion of his constituents. He had held office in the backbench Shipping and Shipbuilding Committees and was Joint Secretary of the Finance Committee. Geoffrey also served on the Select Committees on The Wealth Tax and Statutory Instruments. Richard Page was elected to succeed him in the subsequent by-election. He returned north and was Chairman of the Vale of York constituency association in 1998 and stood for the North Yorkshire County Council in 1997.

=== Personal life ===
He married his first wife, Isabel Neale, in 1949, who died in September 1967 after a long illness. They had one daughter, Helen. He married his second wife, Elizabeth Beeston, in 1971. They had Simon on 15 January 1972 and Mary on 1 January 1974. In October 2002, he underwent a heart bypass after which he retired.

He died on 29 March 2018 at the age of 89.

Parliament of the United Kingdom
Preceded by Sir Gilbert Longden	Member of Parliament for South West Hertfordshire; Feb 1974–1979	Succeeded by Richard Page
