= Tom Cape =

British politician (1868–1947)

Thomas Cape MBE (5 October 1868 in Cockermouth, Cumberland – 1947) was the Labour Party Member of Parliament (MP) for Workington from 1918 to 1945.

Before entering the House of Commons, Thomas Cape, son of William Cape, worked as a miner for twenty-five years between the ages of 13 and 38. He became General Secretary of the Cumberland Miners Association, and was awarded the M.B.E. in 1917. He died in 1947.

== Personal ==
Cape, whose father had also worked as a miner, married Dinah Hodgson in 1890: the marriage produced four recorded sons and three recorded daughters. One son being killed in action WW1 1918.

Parliament of the United Kingdom
New constituency	Member of Parliament for Workington; 1918 – 1945	Succeeded by Fred Peart
Trade union offices
Preceded by Andrew Sharp	General Secretary of the Cumberland Miners' Association; 1916–c.1939	Succeeded by Tom Stephenson
