= Gagan Mohindra =

British politician (born 1978)

Gagan Mohindra MP
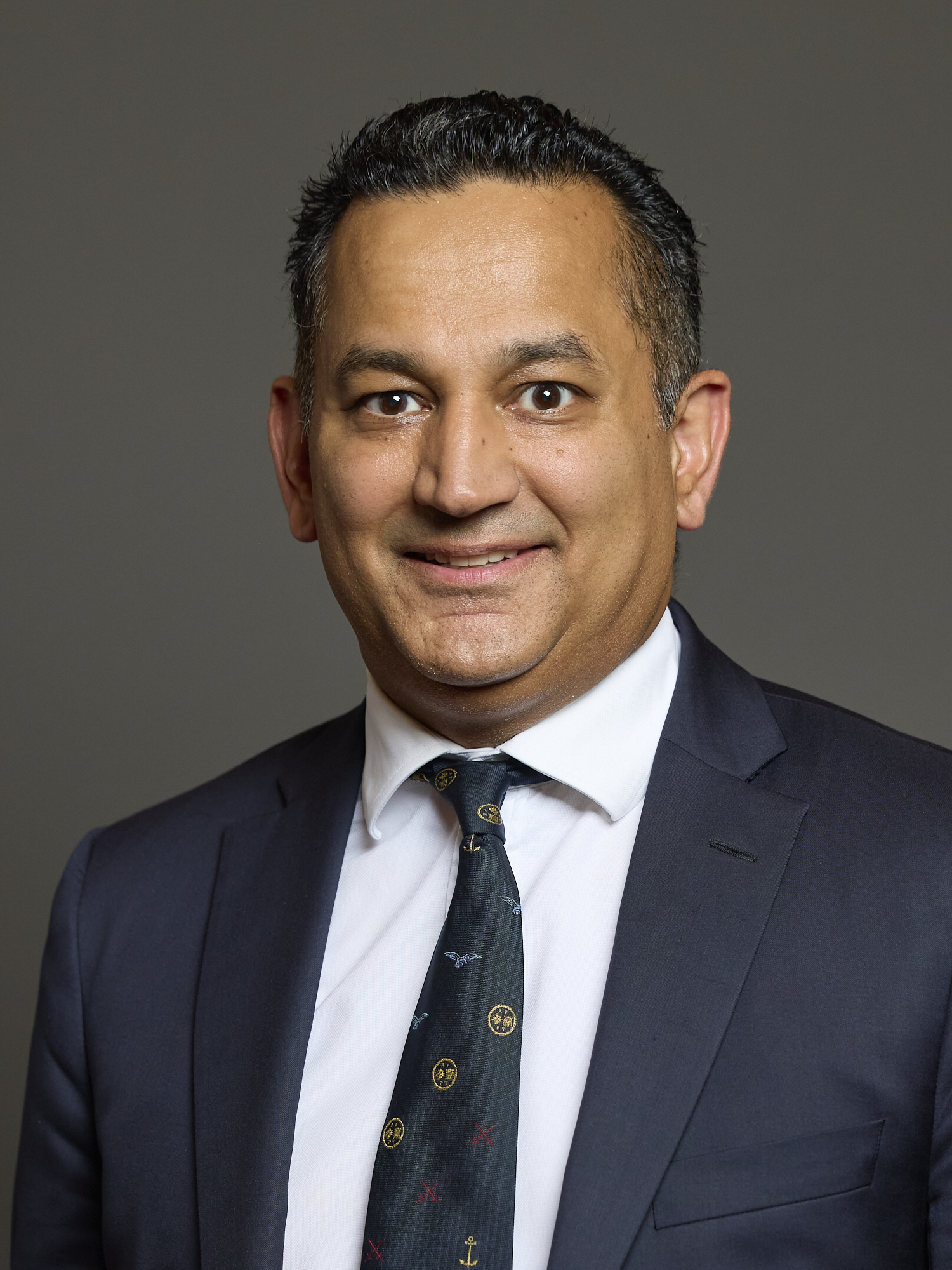
- Official portrait, 2024

Opposition Deputy Chief Whip in the House of Commons
- Incumbent
- Assumed office 6 November 2024 Serving with Joy Morrissey
- Leader: Kemi Badenoch
- Preceded by: Mark Tami

Shadow Minister for Education
- In office 19 July 2024 – 4 November 2024
- Leader: Rishi Sunak
- Preceded by: Catherine McKinnell
- Succeeded by: Neil O'Brien

Assistant Government Whip
- In office 18 September 2023 – 5 July 2024
- Prime Minister: Rishi Sunak

Essex County Councillor for Chigwell and Loughton Broadway
- In office 4 May 2017 – 13 April 2021
- Preceded by: John Knapman
- Succeeded by: Lee Scott

Member of Parliament for South West Hertfordshire
- Incumbent
- Assumed office 12 December 2019
- Preceded by: David Gauke
- Majority: 4,456 (9.23%)

Personal details
- Born: 7 April 1978 (age 48) Barking, London, England
- Party: Conservative
- Education: King's College London (BSc)
- Website: gaganmohindra.org.uk

Gagan Mohindra (born 7 April 1978) is a British politician who has been the Member of Parliament (MP) for South West Hertfordshire since 2019. A member of the Conservative Party, he has been Opposition Deputy Chief Whip in the House of Commons since November 2024, serving alongside Joy Morrissey.

== Early life and career ==
Gagan Mohindra was born on 7 April 1978 into a Punjabi Hindu family. His parents were both from Punjab, and immigrated to the United Kingdom before Mohindra was born. His paternal grandfather served in the British Indian Army. Mohindra was raised as a Hindu.

Mohindra read Mathematics at King's College London and worked in financial services, before founding the Chromex Group four years after graduating, where he worked until 2015.

== Political career ==
Mohindra was elected as a Conservative Party councillor for the Grange Hill Ward of Epping Forest District Council in May 2006, and served as a councillor for the Chigwell and Loughton Broadway division on Essex County Council till 2021. He continued in these roles, unpaid, after being elected to Parliament until 2021. Mohindra was also previously Chairman of Essex Conservatives.

At the 2010 general election, Mohindra stood in North Tyneside, coming third with 18.3% of the vote behind the Labour candidate Mary Glindon and the Liberal Democrat candidate.

He was also shortlisted to become MP for Brentwood and Ongar in 2017, but lost the nomination to Alex Burghart.

== Parliamentary career ==
At the 2019 general election, Mohindra was elected to Parliament as MP for South West Hertfordshire with 49.6% of the vote and a majority of 14,408. He was one of 15 MPs of Indian origin elected at the 2019 general election.

He is a member of the Conservative Friends of India, a group within the Conservative Party.

In 2020, Mohindra was appointed to the Public Accounts Committee.

In October 2020, Mohindra voted against the opposition motion to provide free school meals to children during school holidays.

On 13 June 2022, Mohindra was appointed Parliamentary Private Secretary to Priti Patel, the home secretary, and was appointed as an Assistant Government Whip on 18 September 2023.

At the 2024 general election, Mohindra was re-elected as MP for South West Hertfordshire with a decreased vote share of 34.1% and a decreased majority of 4,456. He became Shadow Minister for Education in July 2024.

Parliament of the United Kingdom
Preceded by David Gauke	Member of Parliament for South West Hertfordshire; 2019–present	Incumbent
