= Dale Campbell-Savours =

British politician (born 1943)

The Right Honourable The Lord Campbell-Savours of Allerdale
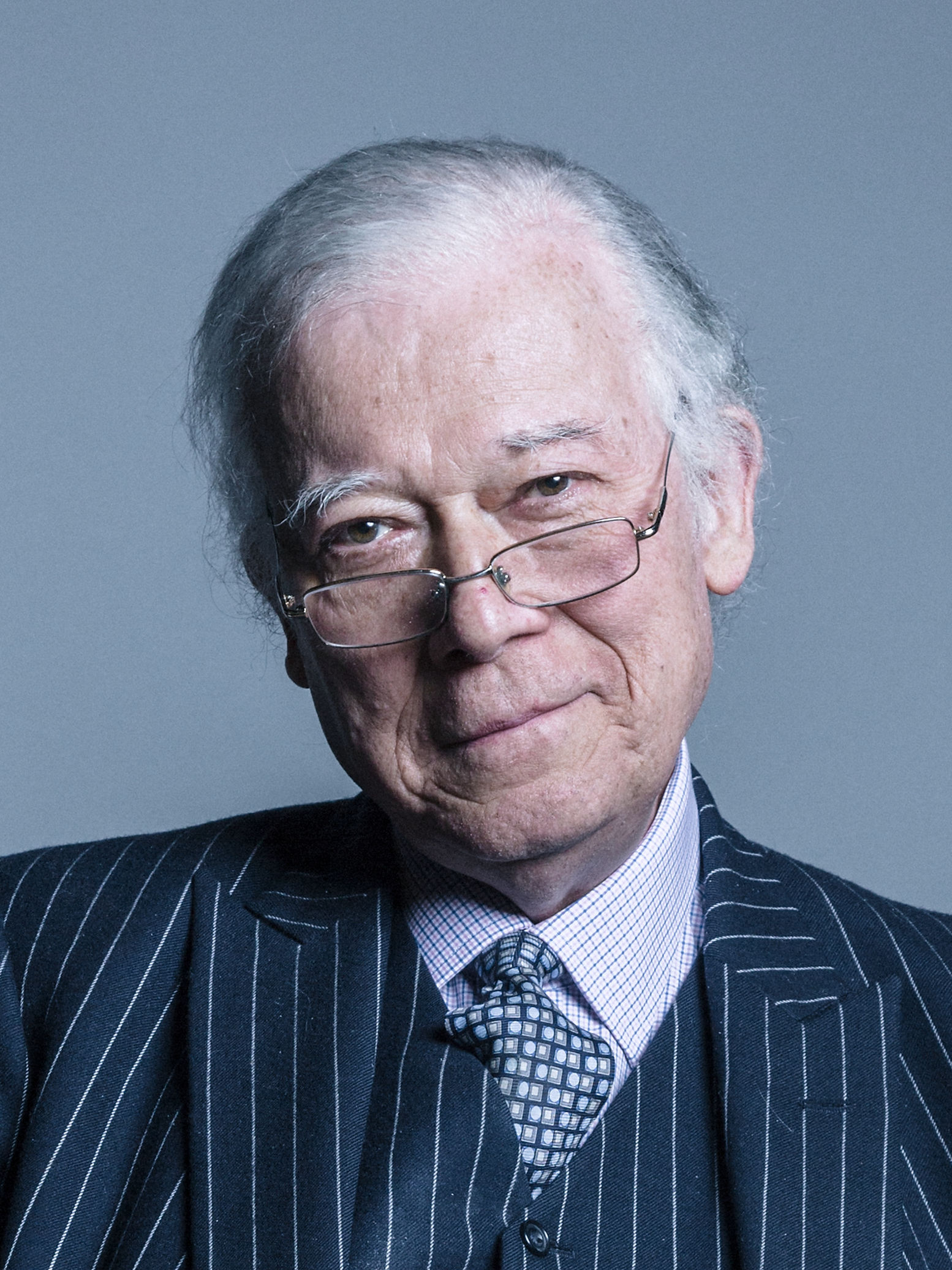
- Official portrait, 2018

Member of the House of Lords
- Lord Temporal
- Life peerage 4 July 2001

Member of Parliament for Workington
- In office 3 May 1979 – 14 May 2001
- Preceded by: Richard Page
- Succeeded by: Tony Cunningham

Personal details
- Born: Dale Norman Campbell-Savours; 23 August 1943 (age 83)
- Party: Labour
- Spouse: Guðrún Kristín Runólfsdóttir
- Children: 3, including Markus

Dale Norman Campbell-Savours, Baron Campbell-Savours (born 23 August 1943) is a British Labour Party politician. The Member of Parliament (MP) for Workington from 1979 to 2001, he retired from the House of Commons due to ill health, and now sits in the House of Lords.

== Early life ==
Campbell-Savours was educated at Keswick School and at the Sorbonne. He travelled in Europe and the Middle East in his early 20s, returning to the UK in the mid-1960s.

== Parliamentary career ==
A councillor on Ramsbottom Urban District Council from 1972 to 1974, he contested Darwen at both the February 1974 and October 1974 general elections and then Workington at a by-election in 1976. He was elected Member of Parliament for Workington at the 1979 general election. Throughout his 22-year membership of the Commons he was repeatedly subject to periods of illness, on each occasion presenting his party with the prospect of by-elections during politically volatile periods.

Campbell-Savours was opposition spokesman for International Development (1991–1992) and for Food, Agriculture and Rural Affairs (1992–1994), resigning from the front bench in 1994 due to ill health: in 1995 half his lung was removed. He was a member of various select committees including: Public Accounts (1980–1991), Members Interest (1982–1990), Procedure (1984–1989), Agriculture (1994–1996), Standards and Privileges (1996–2001), and the Intelligence and Security Committee (1997–2001). He won a number of backbench awards during his period as a member of the House of Commons.

His repeated interventions in Parliament in the 1980s on land reclamation following closure of the Workington steel production plant led directly to the establishment of the West Cumberland Enterprise Zones, opening the door to later commercial developments.

Having negotiated the transfer of ownership of Maryport Harbour into the public sector, he secured support for dredging and harbour improvement, persuading William Waldegrave, then Secretary of State, of the need for financial support to deal with the harbour's contamination.

In 1990 Campbell-Savours established a research project on electoral reform, designing and stress-testing a new voting system: the Supplementary Vote. The system was adopted by the incoming Labour government in 1997 for the election of City Mayors and this was later extended after 2010 by the incoming Coalition government to all English Mayoral Elections and to electing Police and Crime Commissioners, though these reverted to using First Past The Post from 2023.

During his 1990-1992 tenure as a shadow minister for international development, he spearheaded the creation of a working group with the remit to research the creation of a new Department for International Development (DFID) which was subsequently implemented by the incoming Labour government in 1997.

In 1991 Campbell-Savours conducted a four-year project for the creation of a multi campus university in Cumbria, leading to his 1995 proposal for a University of the Lakes, which came to fruition with the establishment of the University of Cumbria in 2007: Campbell-Savours was appointed a university fellow in recognition of his contribution. In 2002 Campbell-Savours spoke out strongly against the introduction of tuition fees, which he argued would undermine the government's apprenticeship training programmes.

As shadow agricultural minister, Campbell-Savours proposed, 1992–94, a national scheme for the registration of cattle for tracking of animal health. This was adopted in 1997, with the British Cattle Movement Service creating employment for over 1,000 people in Workington.

Prior to his retirement from the Commons, Campbell-Savours negotiated a deal with the Labour government for the local authorities to secure ownership over 1000 acres of land, believed at the time to be contaminated, for the price of £1. After long delays, the land on RNAD Broughton Moor is now being commercially developed.

Iraq War: Campbell-Savours supported the liberation of Kuwait, and argued strongly for enforcement of the UN sanctions regime against Iraq, making several visits to Washington to make the case. Opposed to occupation, he did support military intervention. He arranged for his office researcher to visit the Iraqi Turkish border to report on oil sanction breaches. During a series of interventions during the debate on the war, he proposed the development of safe havens for Kurdish refugees seeking sanctuary from Saddam Hussain's military forces. He later described his subsequent support for the war as the biggest misjudgement of his political life, viewing the war in Iraq as a driver behind the resurgence of militant Islam which subsequently spread across North Africa to Afghanistan and Europe.

In 1996 Campbell-Savours gave evidence to the Nolan Commission on the need for a new code of conduct. A number of the recommendations he and others made were accepted by the commission in its final report: Upholding Standards in Public Life.

== House of Lords ==
Campbell-Savours was created a life peer: Baron Campbell-Savours, of Allerdale in the County of Cumbria, on 4 July 2001 and now sits in the House of Lords, serving on select committees including Procedure (2001–2005), Liaison (2005–2009), House (2009–2016), Administration (2008–2015) and Services (2017- )

Campbell-Savours has campaigned for reform of the law on rape, in particular the issue of qualified anonymity for the accused and prosecution of accusers where false accusations are made. In 2006 he used parliamentary privilege to reveal the identity of a serial false accuser, who had previously remained anonymous due to laws which protect women who report sexual assault. His action was praised by some legal practitioners and the Daily Mail, which launched a campaign on anonymity reform. Campaigners from Women Against Rape maintained that the decision to name the woman was illegal, an attack on anonymity laws, and amounted to persecution of women who report rape. The named woman, who was never convicted of perverting the course of justice, said that Campbell-Savours’ decision was a "setback for all victims of sexual assault". He has raised the lack of anonymity injustice in the cases of the singer Cliff Richard, former Home Secretary Leon Brittan, former MP Harvey Proctor, impresario Paul Gambaccini, Greville Janner and others.

Having voted for Common Market entry in 1974, Campbell-Savours (who had spent much of his childhood living in Milan whilst a boarder at Keswick School), remained an advocate for the European Union until 2016, when he argued that Europe's direction of travel paid insufficient regard to the need for stronger border controls, expressing concerns over what he described as the "dark clouds of racial intolerance and extremism sweeping across the continent of Europe". He argued for a review of Schengen and amendment of EU rules on free movement during periods of volatility in international migratory movements, and that a positive response from Europe and a new EU deal on borders should be followed by a second referendum in which he would vote to remain in the EU.

Campbell-Savours has called for reform of land tenure, arguing that profit-taking on land needed for housing development is not in the public interest, and that there should be a new form of housing tenure to describe housing on land acquired at agricultural prices and then sold on for development for huge profits.

In 2021 Campbell-Savours published a report exposing deficiencies in the operation of local government finance arrangements. He argued that council tax favoured much of the south while penalising large areas of the north with higher charges, quoting a £70,000 council or housing association house in his former Workington constituency which paid the same council tax as a luxury £52 million Mayfair residence in London.

During the COVID-19 pandemic Campbell-Savours was advised to stop attending parliament due to his lung condition. Arrangements were made for him to appear on camera in the chamber along with others who were infirm during proceedings, setting a precedent in parliamentary proceedings.

Campbell-Savours was a single voice on the Labour benches opposing the UK's support for Ukraine. He challenged both his party and the government's approach, arguing that it was an important part of Russian policy to maintain a string of non-nuclear, non NATO-affiliated barrier states, from the Arctic through Georgia and the Caucuses. He argued, in the context of a residual debate in Russia over its Second World War losses, that Russia was not a military threat unless provoked, and that opposition to the brutal Putin regime should not be allowed to lead to anti Russian sentiment.

Campbell-Savours' strong support for the state of Israel has been severely tested during the conflict over Gaza. He argues that Palestine should be given full protectorate status under a renewed United Nations mandate, with an administrative power appointed under a process overseen by the permanent members of the United Nation Security Council, perhaps similar to the arrangements under the 1945 Berlin declaration. These ideas have found little support to date.

== Personal life ==
Campbell-Savours married Guðrún Kristín Runólfsdóttir from Reykjavík, Iceland in Reykjavik cathedral in 1970; the couple had three sons.

His son Markus Campbell-Savours was elected Labour MP for Penrith and Solway in the 2024 general election.

Parliament of the United Kingdom
Preceded by Richard Page	Member of Parliament for Workington; 1979–2001	Succeeded by Tony Cunningham
Orders of precedence in the United Kingdom
Preceded by The Lord Fowler	Gentlemen; Baron Campbell-Savours	Followed by The Lord MacGregor of Pulham Market
