= Jonathon Woods =

English footballer

Personal information
- Date of birth: 1889
- Place of birth: Workington, England
- Position: Forward

Senior career*
Years	Team	Apps	(Gls)
19xx–1911	Workington		
1911–1912	Burnley	2	(0)
- * Club domestic league appearances and goals

Jonathon Woods (1889 – after 1911) was an English professional footballer who played as a forward. He played for his hometown club Workington before joining Football League Second Division side Burnley in January 1911. Woods made his league debut for Burnley on 20 March 1911, deputising at for centre forward Charlie Bates in the 1–3 loss to Bolton Wanderers at Turf Moor. He made one further appearance for the club, playing at outside-left in the 0–1 defeat away at Gainsborough Trinity on 6 January 1912. Woods left Burnley shortly afterwards.
