= South West Hertfordshire =

Parliamentary constituency in the United Kingdom, 1950 onwards

Coordinates: 51.67°N 0.47°W

- County constituency for the House of Commons
- Interactive map of boundaries since 2024
- Location within the East of England
- County: Hertfordshire
- Electorate: 71,552 (March 2020)
- Major settlements: Rickmansworth, Kings Langley and Chorleywood

Current constituency
- Created: 1950
- Member of Parliament: Gagan Mohindra (Conservative)
- Seats: One
- Created from: Watford and Hemel Hempstead

South West Hertfordshire is a constituency (Note: A county constituency (for the purposes of election expenses and type of returning officer)) (Note: As with all constituencies, the constituency elects one Member of Parliament (MP) by the first past the post system of election at least every five years.) in the House of Commons of the UK Parliament, represented since 2019 by Gagan Mohindra, a Conservative.

== Constituency profile ==
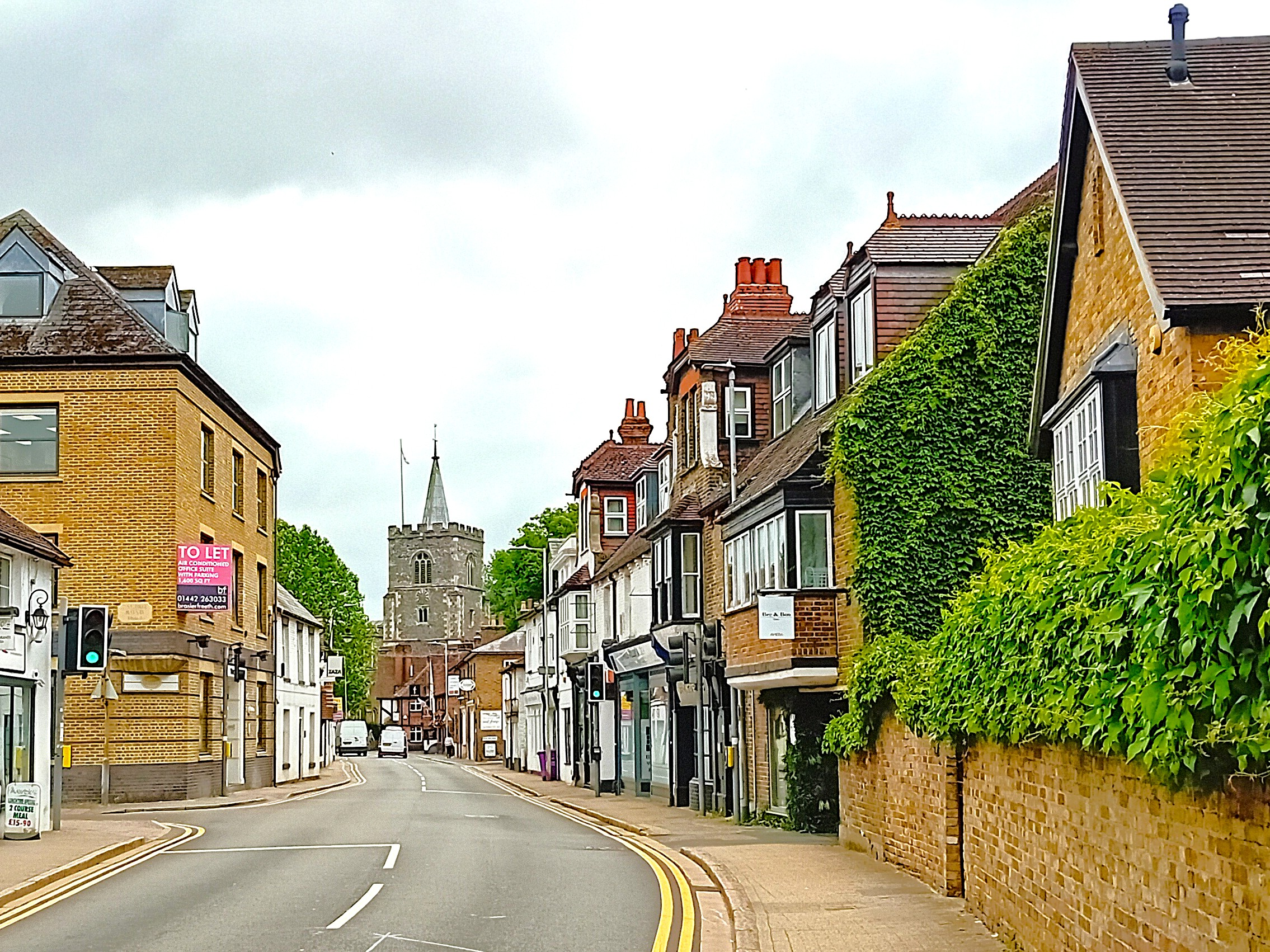
Church Street, Rickmansworth

South West Hertfordshire is a constituency in Hertfordshire in the East of England, covering the Three Rivers district and part of the Dacorum district. Its largest settlement is the town of Rickmansworth, which has a population of around 27,000. Other settlements include the villages of South Oxhey, Moor Park, Chorleywood, Abbots Langley and Kings Langley.

This constituency covers the suburban settlements surrounding the large town of Watford. This area is considered part of the London commuter belt and is located around 18 miles (29 km) north-west of the centre of the capital. Rickmansworth forms part of Metro-land, an area of early-20th-century residential development triggered by the extension of the Metropolitan Railway. Moor Park is a prestigious private estate with some of the country's most expensive properties. Most of this constituency is highly-affluent, containing Green Belt land and numerous golf courses. The constituency's average house price is nearly double the UK average.

South West Hertfordshire has a low proportion of young adults and an above-average population of middle-aged adults with families. Residents have high levels of income and homeownership and the child poverty rate is less than half the overall UK figure. They are generally well-educated and a high proportion work in the construction and science sectors. The percentage claiming unemployment benefits is low. White people made up 78% of the population at the 2021 census. Asians, mostly of Indian origin, were 15% of residents and were mostly concentrated in Moor Park, where they made up nearly half the population.

At the local council level, Abbots Langley and Chorleywood are represented by Liberal Democrats whilst Rickmansworth and the other villages elected Conservatives. An estimated 51% of voters in South West Hertfordshire supported leaving the European Union in the 2016 referendum, similar to the UK-wide figure of 52%.

== Boundaries and boundary changes ==
=== Historic ===
==== 1950–1974 ====
- The Urban Districts of Bushey, Chorleywood, and Rickmansworth; and
- The Rural District of Watford.

The constituency was formed from the Watford Division of Hertfordshire, excluding the part comprising the Municipal Borough of Watford. It also included the parishes of Abbots Langley and Sarratt, transferred from Hemel Hempstead.

==== 1974–1983 ====
- The Urban Districts of Bushey, Chorleywood, and Rickmansworth; and
- The Rural District of Watford civil parishes of Abbots Langley, Sarratt, and Watford Rural.

The parish of Aldenham in the Rural District of Watford was transferred to the new constituency of South Hertfordshire.

==== 1983–1997 ====
- The District of Three Rivers wards of Ashridge, Bedmond, Carpenders Park, Chorleywood, Chorleywood West, Croxley Green, Croxley Green North, Croxley Green South, Hayling, Langleybury, Maple Cross and West Hyde, Mill End, Money Hill, Moor Park, Northwood, Oxhey Hall, Rickmansworth, and Sarratt; and
- The District of Dacorum wards of Berkhamsted Central, Berkhamsted East, Berkhamsted West, Bovingdon and Flaunden, Chipperfield, Kings Langley, and Northchurch.

The parts of the District of Dacorum, including Berkhamsted, were transferred from the abolished constituency of Hemel Hempstead. Abbots Langley was transferred to Watford and Bushey to the new constituency of Hertsmere.

==== 1997–2010 ====
- The District of Three Rivers wards of Ashridge, Chorleywood, Chorleywood West, Croxley Green, Croxley Green North, Croxley Green South, Hayling, Maple Cross and West Hyde, Mill End, Money Hill, Moor Park, Northwood, Rickmansworth, and Sarratt; and
- The District of Dacorum wards of Aldbury and Wigginton, Berkhamsted Central, Berkhamsted East, Berkhamsted West, Bovingdon and Flaunden, Chipperfield, Northchurch, Tring Central, Tring East, and Tring West.

Map of boundaries 2010–2024

Gained Tring from the abolished constituency of West Hertfordshire. Kings Langley transferred to a re-established Hemel Hempstead, Bedmond to St Albans, and three further wards in the Three Rivers District to Watford.

==== 2010–2024 ====
- The District of Three Rivers wards of Chorleywood East, Chorleywood West, Croxley Green, Croxley Green North, Croxley Green South, Hayling, Maple Cross and Mill End, Moor Park and Eastbury, Northwood, Penn, Rickmansworth, Rickmansworth West, and Sarratt; and
- The District of Dacorum wards of Aldbury and Wigginton, Berkhamsted Castle, Berkhamsted East, Berkhamsted West, Bovingdon, Flaunden and Chipperfield, Northchurch, Tring Central, Tring East, and Tring West.

Minor gain from Hemel Hempstead following revision of local authority wards.

=== Current ===
Further to the 2023 review of Westminster constituencies, which came into effect for the 2024 general election, the composition of the constituency is as follows (as they existed on 1 December 2020):

- The Borough of Dacorum ward of Kings Langley.
- The entire District of Three Rivers.

The constituency saw major changes with only 55% of the electorate remaining in the redrawn seat, and only 63% of the redrawn seat's electorate coming from the previous version of the constituency. The bulk of the area in the Borough of Dacorum, including the towns of Berkhamsted and Tring, formed part of the newly created constituency of Harpenden and Berkhamsted. The Bovingdon, Flaunden and Chipperfield ward went to Hemel Hempstead in exchange for the Kings Langley ward. The parts of the District of Three Rivers not previously within the constituency were transferred primarily from Watford, with a small area from St Albans.

== Members of Parliament ==
Watford prior to 1950

Election	Member	Party
1950	Gilbert Longden	Conservative
Feb 1974	Geoffrey Dodsworth	Conservative
1979 by-election	Richard Page	Conservative
2005	David Gauke	Conservative
September 2019	David Gauke	Independent
December 2019	Gagan Mohindra	Conservative

== Elections ==
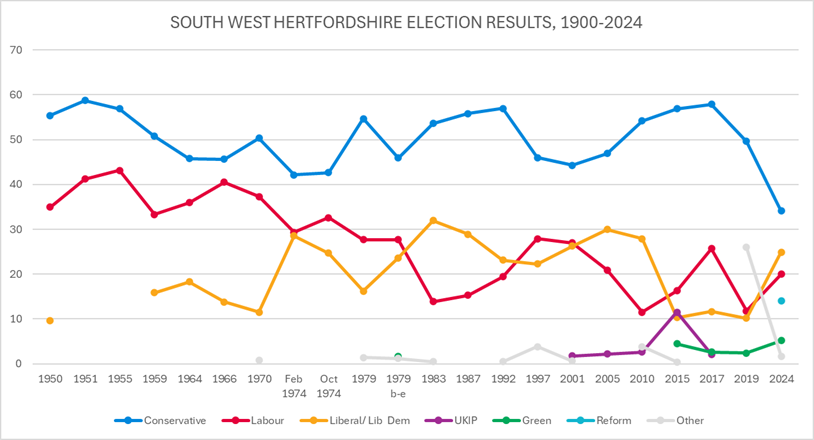
Election results 1950–2024

=== Elections in the 2020s ===
General election 2024: South West Hertfordshire
Party	Candidate	Votes	%	±%
Conservative	Gagan Mohindra	16,458	34.1	−18.1
Liberal Democrats	Sally Symington	12,002	24.9	+12.2
Labour	Alex Sufit	9,637	20.0	+3.9
Reform	Keith Steers	6,790	14.1	N/A
Green	Narinder Sian	2,532	5.2	+3.7
Party of Women	Bernadette O'Malley	295	0.6	N/A
Rejoin EU	Victor Silkin	232	0.5	N/A
SDP	Michael McGetrick	158	0.3	N/A
UK Voice	Ketankumar Pipaliya	150	0.3	N/A
Majority		4,456	9.2	−14.4
Turnout		48,254	67.6	−3.5
Registered electors		71,353		
Conservative hold		Swing	−15.2	

=== Elections in the 2010s ===
2019 notional result
Party	Vote	%
Conservative	26,548	52.2
Others	8,925	17.5
Labour	8,182	16.1
Liberal Democrats	6,460	12.7
Green	763	1.5
Turnout	50,878	71.1
Electorate	71,552	

General election 2019: South West Hertfordshire
Party	Candidate	Votes	%	±%
Conservative	Gagan Mohindra	30,327	49.6	−8.3
Independent	David Gauke	15,919	26.0	+26.0
Labour	Ali Aklakul	7,228	11.8	−13.9
Liberal Democrats	Sally Symington	6,251	10.2	−1.5
Green	Tom Pashby	1,466	2.4	−0.2
Majority		14,408	23.6	−8.6
Turnout		61,191	76.1	+0.6
Conservative hold		Swing		

General election 2017: South West Hertfordshire
Party	Candidate	Votes	%	±%
Conservative	David Gauke	35,128	57.9	+1.0
Labour	Robert Wakely	15,578	25.7	+9.4
Liberal Democrats	Christopher Townsend	7,078	11.7	+1.4
Green	Paul De Hoest	1,576	2.6	−1.9
UKIP	Mark Anderson	1,293	2.1	−9.4
Majority		19,550	32.2	−8.4
Turnout		60,653	75.5	+3.6
Conservative hold		Swing	−4.2	

General election 2015: South West Hertfordshire
Party	Candidate	Votes	%	±%
Conservative	David Gauke	32,608	56.9	+2.7
Labour	Simon Diggins	9,345	16.3	+4.8
UKIP	Mark Anderson	6,603	11.5	+8.9
Liberal Democrats	Nigel Quinton	5,872	10.3	−17.6
Green	Charlotte Pardy	2,583	4.5	N/A
Common Sense Party	Graham Cartmell	256	0.4	N/A
Majority		23,263	40.6	+14.3
Turnout		57,267	71.9	−0.6
Conservative hold		Swing	−1.1	

General election 2010: South West Hertfordshire
Party	Candidate	Votes	%	±%
Conservative	David Gauke	30,773	54.2	+7.2
Liberal Democrats	Christopher Townsend	15,853	27.9	−2.1
Labour	Harry Mann	6,526	11.5	−9.3
UKIP	Mark Benson	1,450	2.6	+0.4
BNP	Deirdre Gates	1,302	2.3	N/A
Independent	James Hannaway	846	1.5	N/A
Majority		14,920	26.29	+9.3
Turnout		56,750	72.53	
Conservative hold		Swing	+4.66	

=== Elections in the 2000s ===
General election 2005: South West Hertfordshire
Party	Candidate	Votes	%	±%
Conservative	David Gauke	23,494	46.9	+2.6
Liberal Democrats	Edward Featherstone	15,021	30.0	+3.7
Labour	Kerron Cross	10,466	20.9	−6.1
UKIP	Colin Rodden	1,107	2.2	+0.4
Majority		8,473	16.9	−0.4
Turnout		50,088	68.5	+4.0
Conservative hold		Swing	−0.5	

General election 2001: South West Hertfordshire
Party	Candidate	Votes	%	±%
Conservative	Richard Page	20,933	44.3	−1.7
Labour	Graham Dale	12,752	27.0	−0.9
Liberal Democrats	Edward Featherstone	12,431	26.3	+4.0
UKIP	Colin Dale-Mills	847	1.8	N/A
ProLife Alliance	Julia Goffin	306	0.6	N/A
Majority		8,181	17.3	−0.8
Turnout		47,269	64.5	−12.8
Conservative hold		Swing		

=== Elections in the 1990s ===
General election 1997: South West Hertfordshire
Party	Candidate	Votes	%	±%
Conservative	Richard Page	25,462	46.0	−11.0
Labour	Mark Wilson	15,441	27.9	+8.5
Liberal Democrats	Ann Shaw	12,381	22.3	−0.8
Referendum	Timothy Millward	1,853	3.3	N/A
Natural Law	Christopher Adamson	274	0.5	0.0
Majority		10,021	18.1	−15.8
Turnout		55,411	77.3	−6.6
Conservative hold		Swing	−9.8	

General election 1992: South West Hertfordshire
Party	Candidate	Votes	%	±%
Conservative	Richard Page	33,825	57.0	+1.2
Liberal Democrats	A Shaw	13,718	23.1	−5.8
Labour	AP Gale	11,512	19.4	+4.1
Natural Law	CJ Adamson	281	0.5	N/A
Majority		20,107	33.9	+7.0
Turnout		59,336	83.7	+6.0
Conservative hold		Swing	+3.5	

=== Elections in the 1980s ===
General election 1987: South West Hertfordshire
Party	Candidate	Votes	%	±%
Conservative	Richard Page	32,791	55.8	+2.2
Liberal	Ian Murray Blair	17,007	28.9	−3.1
Labour	Ian Willmore	8,966	15.3	+1.4
Majority		15,784	26.9	+5.3
Turnout		58,764	77.7	+1.9
Conservative hold		Swing	+2.6	

General election 1983: South West Hertfordshire
Party	Candidate	Votes	%	±%
Conservative	Richard Page	30,217	53.6	−1.1
Liberal	Ian Murray Blair	18,023	32.0	+15.8
Labour	Edward Playfair	7,818	13.9	−13.9
Independent	M Luton	307	0.5	N/A
Majority		12,194	21.6	−5.4
Turnout		56,365	75.8	−3.9
Conservative hold		Swing		

=== Elections in the 1970s ===
By-election 13 December 1979: South West Hertfordshire
Party	Candidate	Votes	%	±%
Conservative	Richard Page	17,031	45.94	−8.75
Labour	Susan Ann Reeves	10,259	27.67	−0.05
Liberal	Dane Clouston	8,752	23.61	+7.41
Ecology	Nigel Jeskins	602	1.62	N/A
ACMFT	David Bundy	288	0.78	N/A
Independent	Nigel Ffooks	143	0.39	N/A
Majority		6,772	18.27	−8.70
Turnout		37,075	48.30	−31.44
Registered electors		76,776		
Conservative hold		Swing	−3.8	

- Note: ACMFT stands for the Anti Common Market and Free Trade Party.
- Resignation of Dodsworth 24 October 1979

General election 1979: South West Hertfordshire
Party	Candidate	Votes	%	±%
Conservative	Geoffrey Dodsworth	33,112	54.69	
Labour	Tony Colman	16,784	27.72	
Liberal	G Cass	9,808	16.20	
National Front	P Graves	839	1.39	N/A
Majority		16,328	26.97	
Turnout		60,543	79.74	
Conservative hold		Swing		

General election October 1974: South West Hertfordshire
Party	Candidate	Votes	%	±%
Conservative	Geoffrey Dodsworth	24,939	42.63	
Labour	ALC Cohen	19,098	32.64	
Liberal	JES Jarrett	14,470	24.73	
Majority		5,841	9.99	
Turnout		58,507	76.99	
Conservative hold		Swing		

General election February 1974: South West Hertfordshire
Party	Candidate	Votes	%	±%
Conservative	Geoffrey Dodsworth	26,563	42.15	
Labour	JE Mitchell	18,465	29.30	
Liberal	JES Jarrett	17,987	28.54	
Majority		8,098	12.85	
Turnout		63,015	83.78	
Conservative hold		Swing		

General election 1970: South West Hertfordshire
Party	Candidate	Votes	%	±%
Conservative	Gilbert Longden	32,661	50.32	
Labour	Bruce Grocott	24,214	37.31	
Liberal	John W.S. Jarrett	7,489	11.54	
Independent Resident	Ronald Skilton	542	0.84	N/A
Majority		8,447	13.01	
Turnout		64,906	75.66	
Conservative hold		Swing		

=== Elections in the 1960s ===
General election 1966: South West Hertfordshire
Party	Candidate	Votes	%	±%
Conservative	Gilbert Longden	28,378	45.66	
Labour	S. John Chapman	25,186	40.52	
Liberal	Peter A.S. Benton	8,590	13.82	
Majority		3,192	5.14	
Turnout		62,154	83.12	
Conservative hold		Swing		

General election 1964: South West Hertfordshire
Party	Candidate	Votes	%	±%
Conservative	Gilbert Longden	28,308	45.77	
Labour	Syd Bidwell	22,237	35.96	
Liberal	R. Douglas Brown	11,301	18.27	
Majority		6,071	9.81	
Turnout		61,846	83.01	
Conservative hold		Swing		

=== Elections in the 1950s ===
General election 1959: South West Hertfordshire
Party	Candidate	Votes	%	±%
Conservative	Gilbert Longden	29,724	50.8	−6.1
Labour	Anthony John Whiteside	19,487	33.3	−9.8
Liberal	Desmond Banks	9,278	15.9	N/A
Majority		10,237	17.5	+3.8
Turnout		58,489	84.4	+3.1
Conservative hold		Swing		

General election 1955: South West Hertfordshire
Party	Candidate	Votes	%	±%
Conservative	Gilbert Longden	28,847	56.87	
Labour	Wyndham Thomas (town planner)	21,878	43.13	
Majority		6,969	13.74	
Turnout		50,725	81.31	
Conservative hold		Swing		

General election 1951: South West Hertfordshire
Party	Candidate	Votes	%	±%
Conservative	Gilbert Longden	27,049	58.75	
Labour	Lawrence Allaker	18,991	41.25	
Majority		8,058	17.50	
Turnout		46,040	85.02	
Conservative hold		Swing		

General election 1950: South West Hertfordshire
Party	Candidate	Votes	%	±%
Conservative	Gilbert Longden	23,608	55.37	
Labour	Lawrence Allaker	14,913	34.98	
Liberal	George C Middleton	4,114	9.65	
Majority		8,695	20.39	
Turnout		42,635	86.10	
Conservative win (new seat)				

== See also ==
- List of parliamentary constituencies in Hertfordshire
- List of parliamentary constituencies in the East of England (region)
- 1979 South West Hertfordshire by-election
