= Professional support lawyer =

Law firm assistant

The professional support lawyer (PSL) role, also known as Knowledge Lawyer role, has its origins in the United Kingdom and is a non client-facing resource to provide complex problem solving, research, training, and strategic market positioning within a given practice area in support of fee-earning lawyers. PSL's often advise fee-earning lawyers on complex matters and frontier legal developments; design and deliver training for fee-earners on legal theory, precedent, and trends; and prepare articles and client-briefs to both support business development and keep internal and external clients appraised of major new trends.

== Background ==
The idea of professional support lawyers began in the 1990s in English law offices. PSLs, usually former senior fee-earners, are tasked with managing the knowledge function of a legal practice area and leading the learning and development of their practice group. PSLs are non-fee earning, providing technical expertise and experience to fee-earners to help enhance the efficiency and effectiveness of fee-earning work. This can include helping fee-earners to problem-solve on complex legal matters within frontier areas; aiding fee-earning lawyers to stay up-to-date with legal developments; helping to assess risk on fee-earning matters; providing training for fee-earning lawyers at all levels; and externally facing knowledge products (client briefs, workshops, trainings etc.) to support business development. The role of PSL has evolved significantly since its origins in Magic Circle firms in the UK, and is often considered a prestigious alternative to fee-earning work for senior, actively-registered lawyers, who are deemed to be technically excellent.

== Job description ==
The role of a PSL is different from firm to firm. Common responsibilities include:

- 1) Legal Research: PSLs often lead complex legal research, analysing legal matters and developing legal strategy to support fee-earners on difficult issues within specific matters, and to provide guidance to fee-earners on the evolution of legislation, case-law, and legal trends.
- 2) Strategic Client Support: PSLs often provide advice and training to clients to keep them appraised of industry insights, legal developments, and legal trends, serving as a means to show that the firm at the cutting edge of the practice of the law.
- 3) Training and Professional Development: PSLs are responsible for developing and delivering training programmes (on the substance of their practice area) to lawyers at all levels of the firm. This can include organising seminars, workshops, and webinars on foundational legal topics, industry trends, and practice-specific updates.
- 4) Legal Writing and Publication: PSLs often are responsible for preparing the contribution of the firm to legal journals and publications, sharing insights and analyses on legal trends and developments, as well responding to consultation processes (with government or supra-governmental actors) within their practice area. Internally, they often also lead the preparation of practice guides and legal templates to support fee-earners.
- 5) Quality Control and Risk Management: PSLs are sometimes tasked with reviewing and validating legal documents, ensuring high quality standards and ensuring compliance.
