= Workington (constituency) =

Parliamentary constituency in the United Kingdom, 1918-2024

Coordinates: 54.643°N 3.549°W

- Former county constituency for the House of Commons
- Boundary of Workington in Cumbria

- Location of Cumbria within England
- County: Cumbria
- Electorate: 59,361 (December 2010)
- Major settlements: Workington, Maryport, Cockermouth, Silloth, Aspatria

1918–2024
- Seats: One
- Created from: Cockermouth and Eskdale
- Replaced by: Penrith and Solway, Whitehaven and Workington

Workington was a constituency (Note: A county constituency (for the purposes of election expenses and type of returning officer).) in Cumbria represented in the House of Commons of the UK Parliament. (Note: As with all constituencies, the constituency elects one Member of Parliament (MP) by the first past the post system of election at least every five years.)

Further to the completion of the 2023 Periodic Review of Westminster constituencies, the seat was abolished. The town of Workington itself was combined with the majority of the also-abolished constituency of Copeland to form Whitehaven and Workington. The remainder, comprising the majority of the electorate, formed part of the new seat of Penrith and Solway.

Workington
- Interactive map of Workington

Racial makeup (2021)
  - White: 98.6%
  - Mixed: 0.6%
  - Asian: 0.5%
  - Other: 0.2%
  - Black: 0.1%

== Boundaries ==
Map of boundaries 2010-2024

The constituency covered much of the north-west of Cumbria, corresponding largely to the Allerdale borough, except for the areas around Wigton and Keswick. As well as Workington itself, the constituency contained the towns of Cockermouth, Maryport, Aspatria and Silloth.

1918–1950: The Municipal Borough of Workington, the Urban Districts of Arlecdon and Frizington, Aspatria, Harrington, and Maryport, and parts of the Rural Districts of Cockermouth, Whitehaven, and Wigton.

1950–1983: The Municipal Borough of Workington, the Urban Districts of Cockermouth, Keswick, and Maryport, and the Rural District of Cockermouth.

1983–1997: The District of Allerdale wards of All Saints, Binsey, Broughton, Castle, Clifton, Crummock, Dalton, Dearham, Derwent Valley, Ellen, Ellenborough, Ewanrigg, Flimby, Harrington, Keswick, Moorclose, Netherhall, Northside, St Bridget's, St John's, St Michael's, Salterbeck, Seaton Moor, Stainburn, and Westfield.

1997–2010: All the wards of the District of Allerdale except the Marsh, Wampool, Warnell and Wigton wards.

2010–2024: The Borough of Allerdale wards of All Saints, Aspatria, Boltons, Broughton St Bridget's, Christchurch, Clifton, Ellen, Ellenborough, Ewanrigg, Flimby, Harrington, Holme, Marsh, Moorclose, Moss Bay, Netherhall, St John's, St Michael's, Seaton, Silloth, Solway, Stainburn, Wampool, Waver, and Wharrels.

== History ==
The constituency was created by the Representation of the People Act 1918, which also abolished the seat of Cockermouth. Workington has traditionally supported the Labour Party, although a by-election in 1976 (forced by the elevation of Fred Peart to the House of Lords) was won by Richard Page of the Conservative Party. However, the constituency reverted to type at the 1979 general election when it was regained by Labour. Labour held the seat until the 2019 general election, when Mark Jenkinson won the seat for Conservatives for the first time in forty years.

== Members of Parliament ==
| Election | Member | Party |
|---|---|---|
| 1918 | Thomas Cape | Labour |
| 1945 | Fred Peart | Labour |
| 1976 by-election | Richard Page | Conservative |
| 1979 | Dale Campbell-Savours | Labour |
| 2001 | Tony Cunningham | Labour |
| 2015 | Sue Hayman | Labour |
| 2019 | Mark Jenkinson | Conservative |
| 2024 | Constituency abolished | |

== Elections ==
=== Elections in the 2010s ===
General election 2019: Workington
| Party | Candidate | Votes | % | ±% |
|---|---|---|---|---|
| Conservative | Mark Jenkinson | 20,488 | 49.3 | +7.6 |
| Labour | Sue Hayman | 16,312 | 39.2 | ―11.9 |
| Brexit Party | David Walker | 1,749 | 4.2 | New |
| Liberal Democrats | Neil Hughes | 1,525 | 3.7 | +1.0 |
| Independent | Nicky Cockburn | 842 | 2.0 | New |
| Green | Jill Perry | 596 | 1.4 | New |
| Independent | Roy Ivinson | 87 | 0.2 | ―0.5 |
| Majority | | 4,176 | 10.1 | N/A |
| Turnout | | 41,599 | 67.8 | ―1.4 |
| Conservative gain from Labour | | Swing | +9.7 | |

General election 2017: Workington
| Party | Candidate | Votes | % | ±% |
|---|---|---|---|---|
| Labour | Sue Hayman | 21,317 | 51.1 | +8.8 |
| Conservative | Clark Vasey | 17,392 | 41.7 | +11.6 |
| UKIP | George Kemp | 1,556 | 3.7 | ―15.9 |
| Liberal Democrats | Phill Roberts | 1,133 | 2.7 | ―1.7 |
| Independent | Roy Ivinson | 278 | 0.7 | +0.2 |
| Majority | | 3,925 | 9.4 | ―2.8 |
| Turnout | | 41,676 | 69.2 | +3.6 |
| Labour hold | | Swing | ―1.4 | |

General election 2015: Workington
| Party | Candidate | Votes | % | ±% |
|---|---|---|---|---|
| Labour | Sue Hayman | 16,282 | 42.3 | ―3.2 |
| Conservative | Rozila Kana | 11,596 | 30.1 | ―3.8 |
| UKIP | Mark Jenkinson | 7,538 | 19.6 | +17.4 |
| Liberal Democrats | Phill Roberts | 1,708 | 4.4 | ―11.1 |
| Green | Jill Perry | 1,149 | 3.0 | New |
| Independent | Roy Ivinson | 190 | 0.5 | New |
| Majority | | 4,686 | 12.2 | +0.6 |
| Turnout | | 38,463 | 65.6 | ―0.3 |
| Labour hold | | Swing | | |

General election 2010: Workington
| Party | Candidate | Votes | % | ±% |
|---|---|---|---|---|
| Labour | Tony Cunningham | 17,865 | 45.5 | ―6.5 |
| Conservative | Judith Pattinson | 13,290 | 33.9 | +4.8 |
| Liberal Democrats | Stan Collins | 5,318 | 13.5 | ―0.9 |
| BNP | Martin Wingfield | 1,496 | 3.8 | New |
| UKIP | Steve Lee | 876 | 2.2 | ―1.2 |
| English Democrat | Rob Logan | 414 | 1.1 | New |
| Majority | | 4,575 | 11.6 | ―11.2 |
| Turnout | | 39,259 | 65.9 | +3.4 |
| Labour hold | | Swing | ―5.7 | |

=== Elections in the 2000s ===
General election 2005: Workington
| Party | Candidate | Votes | % | ±% |
|---|---|---|---|---|
| Labour | Tony Cunningham | 19,554 | 50.5 | ―5.0 |
| Conservative | Judith Pattinson | 11,659 | 30.1 | +0.5 |
| Liberal Democrats | Kate Clarkson | 5,815 | 15.0 | +2.5 |
| UKIP | Mark Richardson | 1,328 | 3.4 | New |
| Legalise Cannabis | John Peacock | 381 | 1.0 | ―1.5 |
| Majority | | 7,895 | 20.4 | ―5.5 |
| Turnout | | 38,737 | 64.7 | +1.3 |
| Labour hold | | Swing | ―2.8 | |

General election 2001: Workington
| Party | Candidate | Votes | % | ±% |
|---|---|---|---|---|
| Labour | Tony Cunningham | 23,209 | 55.5 | ―8.7 |
| Conservative | Timothy Stoddart | 12,359 | 29.6 | +5.2 |
| Liberal Democrats | Ian Francis | 5,214 | 12.5 | +4.5 |
| Legalise Cannabis | John Peacock | 1,040 | 2.5 | New |
| Majority | | 10,850 | 25.9 | ―13.9 |
| Turnout | | 41,822 | 63.4 | ―11.7 |
| Labour hold | | Swing | | |

=== Elections in the 1990s ===
General election 1997: Workington
| Party | Candidate | Votes | % | ±% |
|---|---|---|---|---|
| Labour | Dale Campbell-Savours | 31,717 | 64.2 | +10.0 |
| Conservative | Robert Blunden | 12,061 | 24.4 | ―12.0 |
| Liberal Democrats | Philip Roberts | 3,967 | 8.0 | +0.6 |
| Referendum | George Donnan | 1,412 | 2.9 | New |
| Independent | Chris Austin | 217 | 0.4 | New |
| Majority | | 19,656 | 39.8 | +17.5 |
| Turnout | | 49,374 | 75.1 | ―6.9 |
| Labour hold | | Swing | +11.0 | |

General election 1992: Workington
| Party | Candidate | Votes | % | ±% |
|---|---|---|---|---|
| Labour | Dale Campbell-Savours | 26,719 | 56.9 | +4.5 |
| Conservative | Stuart Sexton | 16,270 | 34.7 | ―2.4 |
| Liberal Democrats | Christine Neale | 3,028 | 6.5 | New |
| Monster Raving Loony | David Langstaff | 755 | 1.6 | New |
| Natural Law | Nicola Escott | 183 | 0.4 | New |
| Majority | | 10,449 | 22.2 | +6.9 |
| Turnout | | 46,955 | 81.5 | +0.9 |
| Labour hold | | Swing | +3.5 | |

=== Elections in the 1980s ===
General election 1987: Workington
| Party | Candidate | Votes | % | ±% |
|---|---|---|---|---|
| Labour | Dale Campbell-Savours | 24,019 | 52.4 | +0.4 |
| Conservative | Anne McIntosh | 17,000 | 37.1 | +1.0 |
| Liberal | Greville Badger | 4,853 | 10.6 | ―1.2 |
| Majority | | 7,019 | 15.3 | ―0.7 |
| Turnout | | 45,872 | 80.6 | +1.0 |
| Labour hold | | Swing | | |

General election 1983: Workington
| Party | Candidate | Votes | % | ±% |
|---|---|---|---|---|
| Labour | Dale Campbell-Savours | 23,239 | 52.0 | ―1.2 |
| Conservative | Michael Smith | 16,111 | 36.1 | ―4.6 |
| Liberal | Neil Blackshaw | 5,311 | 11.8 | +5.8 |
| Majority | | 7,128 | 15.9 | +3.4 |
| Turnout | | 44,661 | 79.6 | ―5.2 |
| Labour hold | | Swing | +1.7 | |

=== Elections in the 1970s ===
General election 1979: Workington
| Party | Candidate | Votes | % | ±% |
|---|---|---|---|---|
| Labour | Dale Campbell-Savours | 24,523 | 53.2 | ―2.2 |
| Conservative | Richard Page | 18,767 | 40.7 | +8.4 |
| Liberal | N. Blackshaw | 2,819 | 6.1 | ―5.7 |
| Majority | | 5,756 | 12.5 | ―11.2 |
| Turnout | | 46,109 | 83.8 | +8.0 |
| Labour hold | | Swing | | |

By-election 1976: Workington
| Party | Candidate | Votes | % | ±% |
|---|---|---|---|---|
| Conservative | Richard Page | 19,396 | 48.2 | +15.9 |
| Labour | Dale Campbell-Savours | 18,331 | 45.6 | −10.4 |
| Liberal | Bernard Wates | 2,480 | 6.2 | −5.6 |
| Majority | | 1,065 | 2.6 | N/A |
| Turnout | | 40,207 | | |
| Conservative gain from Labour | | Swing | +13.2 | |

General election October 1974: Workington
| Party | Candidate | Votes | % | ±% |
|---|---|---|---|---|
| Labour | Fred Peart | 22,539 | 56.0 | −3.7 |
| Conservative | Richard Page | 12,988 | 32.3 | −8.1 |
| Liberal | J. Burns | 4,728 | 11.8 | New |
| Majority | | 9,551 | 23.7 | +4.4 |
| Turnout | | 40,255 | 75.8 | −0.6 |
| Labour hold | | Swing | | |

General election February 1974: Workington
| Party | Candidate | Votes | % | ±% |
|---|---|---|---|---|
| Labour | Fred Peart | 24,000 | 60.0 | −2.0 |
| Conservative | Richard Page | 16,230 | 40.3 | +2.0 |
| Majority | | 7,770 | 19.3 | −4.1 |
| Turnout | | 40,230 | 76.4 | −1.0 |
| Labour hold | | Swing | | |

General election 1970: Workington
| Party | Candidate | Votes | % | ±% |
|---|---|---|---|---|
| Labour | Fred Peart | 24,975 | 61.7 | −1.6 |
| Conservative | Michael Turner-Bridger | 15,532 | 38.3 | +1.6 |
| Majority | | 9,443 | 23.4 | −3.2 |
| Turnout | | 40,507 | 77.4 | −3.0 |
| Labour hold | | Swing | -1.6 | |

=== Elections in the 1960s ===
General election 1966: Workington
| Party | Candidate | Votes | % | ±% |
|---|---|---|---|---|
| Labour | Fred Peart | 24,981 | 63.3 | +1.2 |
| Conservative | Michael Fernley Turner-Bridger | 14,475 | 36.7 | −1.2 |
| Majority | | 10,506 | 26.6 | +2.4 |
| Turnout | | 39,456 | 80.4 | =3.1 |
| Labour hold | | Swing | | |

General election 1964: Workington
| Party | Candidate | Votes | % | ±% |
|---|---|---|---|---|
| Labour | Fred Peart | 25,522 | 62.1 | +2.0 |
| Conservative | Harold Denman | 15,565 | 37.9 | −1.9 |
| Majority | | 9,957 | 24.2 | +3.8 |
| Turnout | | 41,087 | 83.48 | −2.4 |
| Labour hold | | Swing | | |

=== Elections in the 1950s ===
General election 1959: Workington
| Party | Candidate | Votes | % | ±% |
|---|---|---|---|---|
| Labour | Fred Peart | 25,537 | 60.18 | |
| Conservative | T Martin Brannan | 16,894 | 39.82 | |
| Majority | | 8,643 | 20.36 | |
| Turnout | | 42,431 | 85.89 | |
| Labour hold | | Swing | | |

General election 1955: Workington
| Party | Candidate | Votes | % | ±% |
|---|---|---|---|---|
| Labour | Fred Peart | 25,110 | 59.4 | −0.6 |
| Conservative | T Martin Brannan | 17,182 | 40.6 | +0.6 |
| Majority | | 7,982 | 18.8 | −1.2 |
| Turnout | | 42,292 | 86.14 | −1.39 |
| Labour hold | | Swing | | |

General election 1951: Workington
| Party | Candidate | Votes | % | ±% |
|---|---|---|---|---|
| Labour | Fred Peart | 25,893 | 60.02 | +2.41 |
| Conservative | Helen Fox | 17,249 | 39.98 | +7.83 |
| Majority | | 8,644 | 20.04 | −5.42 |
| Turnout | | 43,142 | 87.53 | −1.91 |
| Labour hold | | Swing | -5.42 | |

General election 1950: Workington
| Party | Candidate | Votes | % |
|---|---|---|---|
| Labour | Fred Peart | 25,104 | 57.61 |
| Conservative | Helen Fox | 14,009 | 32.15 |
| Liberal | David Cedric Gwynne Sibley | 4,460 | 10.24 |
| Majority | | 11,095 | 25.46 |
| Turnout | | 43,573 | 89.44 |
| Labour hold | | | |

- This constituency underwent boundary changes between the 1945 and 1950 general elections and thus calculation of change in vote share is not meaningful.

=== Election in the 1940s ===
General election 1945: Workington
| Party | Candidate | Votes | % | ±% |
|---|---|---|---|---|
| Labour | Fred Peart | 24,876 | 72.5 | N/A |
| Conservative | G.C. White | 9,438 | 27.5 | New |
| Majority | | 15,438 | 45.0 | N/A |
| Turnout | | 34,314 | 80.7 | N/A |
| Labour hold | | Swing | N/A | |

=== Elections in the 1930s ===
General election 1935: Workington
| Party | Candidate | Votes | % | ±% |
|---|---|---|---|---|
| Labour | Thomas Cape | Unopposed | | |
| Labour hold | | Swing | | |

General election 1931: Workington
| Party | Candidate | Votes | % | ±% |
|---|---|---|---|---|
| Labour | Thomas Cape | 18,469 | 54.91 | −10.3 |
| Conservative | Christopher Lowther | 15,165 | 45.09 | +10.3 |
| Majority | | 3,304 | 9.82 | −20.6 |
| Turnout | | 33,634 | 85.91 | −10.3 |
| Labour hold | | Swing | -10.3 | |

=== Elections in the 1920s ===
General election 1929: Workington
| Party | Candidate | Votes | % | ±% |
|---|---|---|---|---|
| Labour | Thomas Cape | 20,591 | 65.2 | +9.6 |
| Unionist | John Mellor | 10,995 | 34.8 | −9.6 |
| Majority | | 9,596 | 30.4 | +19.2 |
| Turnout | | 31,586 | 81.2 | −3.2 |
| Registered electors | | 38,915 | | |
| Labour hold | | Swing | +9.6 | |

General election 1924: Workington
| Party | Candidate | Votes | % | ±% |
|---|---|---|---|---|
| Labour | Thomas Cape | 15,353 | 55.6 | −0.9 |
| Unionist | E. Davies | 12,243 | 44.4 | +0.9 |
| Majority | | 3,110 | 11.2 | −1.8 |
| Turnout | | 27,596 | 84.4 | +0.9 |
| Registered electors | | 32,690 | | |
| Labour hold | | Swing | −0.9 | |

General election 1923: Workington
| Party | Candidate | Votes | % | ±% |
|---|---|---|---|---|
| Labour | Thomas Cape | 15,296 | 56.5 | +1.8 |
| Unionist | Lancelot Evelyn Gaunt | 11,781 | 43.5 | −1.8 |
| Majority | | 3,515 | 13.0 | +3.6 |
| Turnout | | 27,077 | 83.5 | −0.2 |
| Registered electors | | 32,425 | | |
| Labour hold | | Swing | +1.8 | |

General election 1922: Workington
| Party | Candidate | Votes | % | ±% |
|---|---|---|---|---|
| Labour | Thomas Cape | 14,546 | 54.7 | +3.2 |
| Unionist | Lancelot Evelyn Gaunt | 12,064 | 45.3 | +16.0 |
| Majority | | 2,482 | 9.4 | −12.8 |
| Turnout | | 26,610 | 83.7 | +13.0 |
| Registered electors | | 31,789 | | |
| Labour hold | | Swing | −6.4 | |

=== Election in the 1910s ===
General election 1918: Workington
| Party | Candidate | Votes | % |
|---|---|---|---|
| Labour | Thomas Cape | 10,441 | 51.5 |
| Unionist | D.J. Mason | 5,946 | 29.3 |
| Liberal | Robert Strother Stewart* | 2,968 | 14.6 |
| Independent | R. Millican | 943 | 4.6 |
| Majority | | 4,495 | 22.2 |
| Turnout | | 20,298 | 70.7 |
| Registered electors | | 28,691 | |
| Labour win (new seat) | | | |

* Stewart was endorsed by the Coalition Government but repudiated it.

== See also ==
- List of parliamentary constituencies in Cumbria
