= Fred Peart, Baron Peart =

British politician (1914–1988)

The Right Honourable The Lord Peart PC
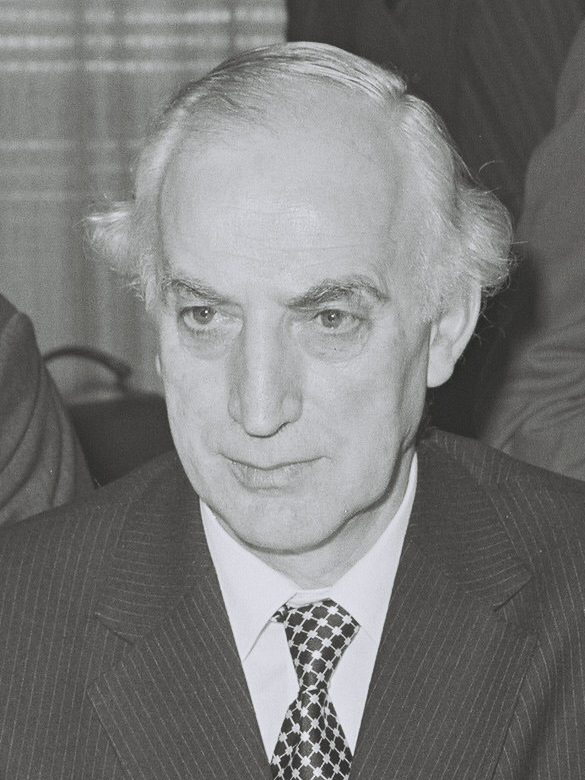
- Peart in 1974

Leader of the Opposition in the Lords Shadow Leader of the House of Lords
- In office 4 May 1979 – 4 November 1982
- Leader: James Callaghan; Michael Foot
- Preceded by: The Lord Carrington
- Succeeded by: The Lord Cledwyn of Penrhos

Leader of the House of Lords
- In office 10 September 1976 – 4 May 1979
- Prime Minister: James Callaghan
- Preceded by: The Lord Shepherd
- Succeeded by: The Lord Soames

Lord Keeper of the Privy Seal
- In office 10 September 1976 – 4 May 1979
- Prime Minister: James Callaghan
- Preceded by: The Lord Shepherd
- Succeeded by: Ian Gilmour
- In office 6 April 1968 – 1 November 1968
- Prime Minister: Harold Wilson
- Preceded by: The Lord Shackleton
- Succeeded by: The Lord Shackleton

Minister of Agriculture, Fisheries and Food
- In office 5 March 1974 – 10 September 1976
- Prime Minister: Harold Wilson; James Callaghan
- Preceded by: Joseph Godber
- Succeeded by: John Silkin
- In office 18 October 1964 – 6 April 1968
- Prime Minister: Harold Wilson
- Preceded by: Christopher Soames
- Succeeded by: Cledwyn Hughes
Shadow Cabinet offices
Shadow Secretary of State for Defence
In office 7 December 1972 – 5 March 1974
Leader	Harold Wilson
Preceded by	George Thomson
Succeeded by	Ian Gilmour
Shadow Minister of Agriculture, Fisheries and Food
In office 16 December 1971 – 7 December 1972
Leader	Harold Wilson
Preceded by	Cledwyn Hughes
Succeeded by	Norman Buchan
Shadow Leader of the House of Commons
In office 20 June 1970 – 16 December 1971
Leader	Harold Wilson
Preceded by	Selwyn Lloyd (1965)
Succeeded by	Michael Foot

Leader of the House of Commons Lord President of the Council
- In office 1 November 1968 – 20 June 1970
- Prime Minister: Harold Wilson
- Preceded by: Dick Crossman
- Succeeded by: William Whitelaw
Parliamentary offices
Member of the House of Lords Lord Temporal
In office 23 September 1976 – 26 August 1988; Life Peerage
Member of Parliament for Workington
In office 5 July 1945 – 23 September 1976
Preceded by	Thomas Cape
Succeeded by	Richard Page

Personal details
- Born: Thomas Frederick Peart; 30 April 1914 Durham, England
- Died: 26 August 1988 (aged 74) London, England
- Party: Labour
- Spouse: Bette Lewis (m. 1945)
- Children: 1
- Education: Durham University

Thomas Frederick Peart, Baron Peart, PC (30 April 1914 – 26 August 1988) was a British Labour politician who served in the Labour governments of the 1960s and 1970s and was a candidate for Deputy Leader of the Party.

== Early life and education ==
Thomas Frederick Peart was born in Durham, England, in 1914, the son of Emerson Featherstone Peart, a headmaster and leading Labour member of Durham County Council, and Florence Blissenden. The younger Peart qualified as a teacher at the University of Durham in 1936. During his time at university he was President of the Durham Union for Epiphany term of 1936. He studied at the Inner Temple but did not enter the legal profession, instead teaching economics in Durham. He served in the Royal Artillery in World War II, gaining the rank of captain.

== Political career ==
Peart was elected Member of Parliament for Workington in 1945, serving until 1976. He initially served as PPS to the Minister of Agriculture & Fisheries (Tom Williams).

Peart, along with the rest of the Labour Party, went into opposition following Winston Churchill's 1951 election victory. In 1964, he returned to government after Harold Wilson defeated Alec Douglas-Home at that year's election. He was appointed to the Cabinet holding the Cabinet post of Minister of Agriculture, Fisheries and Food. His tenure saw advances in pay for agricultural labourers, and in technology.

In 1968, Peart became Lord Privy Seal, with no particular responsibilities. Seven months later, Peart became Leader of the House of Commons, taking the subsidiary title Lord President of the Council. After Labour lost the 1970 election, Peart returned to opposition as Shadow Leader of the House of Commons. He held that position until December 1971, when he became Shadow Agriculture Minister. When Labour returned to power, Peart once more took the Agriculture portfolio.

On 23 September 1976, Peart was created a life peer as Baron Peart, of Workington in the County of Cumbria, to serve as Leader of the House of Lords and Lord Privy Seal at a time when the Labour faction in the Lords was tiny compared to the vast Tory majority, mainly composed of hereditary peers.

After Margaret Thatcher won the 1979 election, Peart continued as Leader of the Labour Peers and thus became Shadow Leader of the House of Lords. He served in those roles until 1982, when he was defeated for re-election by Lord Cledwyn of Penrhos in a vote among Labour peers.

== Personal life and death ==
In 1945, Peart married Bette Lewis, and they had one son.

On 6 June 1975, Peart was on board the train which derailed in the Nuneaton rail crash; he survived with minor injuries.

In 1984, Peart was attacked by two robbers who broke into his London home. His health went into a steep decline, and he died at a hospital in London on 26 August 1988, at the age of 74.

== See also ==
- List of Durham University people
- List of presidents of the Durham Union

Parliament of the United Kingdom
Preceded by Thomas Cape	Member of Parliament for Workington; 1945–1976	Succeeded by Richard Page
Political offices
Preceded by Christopher Soames	Minister of State for Agriculture, Fisheries and Food; 1964–1968	Succeeded by Cledwyn Hughes
Preceded by The Lord Shackleton	Lord Privy Seal; 1968	Succeeded by The Lord Shackleton
Preceded by Dick Crossman	Leader of the House of Commons; 1968–1970	Succeeded by William Whitelaw
Preceded by Dick Crossman	Lord President of the Council; 1968–1970	Succeeded by William Whitelaw
Vacant Title last held by Selwyn Lloyd	Shadow Leader of the House of Commons; 1970–1971	Succeeded by Michael Foot
Preceded by George Thomson	Shadow Secretary of State for Defence; 1972–1974	Succeeded by Ian Gilmour
Preceded by Joseph Godber	Minister of State for Agriculture, Fisheries and Food; 1974–1976	Succeeded by John Silkin
Preceded by The Lord Shepherd	Leader of the House of Lords; 1976–1979	Succeeded by The Lord Soames
Preceded by The Lord Shepherd	Lord Privy Seal; 1976–1979	Succeeded by Ian Gilmour
Preceded by The Lord Carrington	Shadow Leader of the House of Lords; 1979–1982	Succeeded by The Lord Cledwyn of Penrhos
Party political offices
Preceded by The Lord Shepherd	Leader of the Labour Party in the House of Lords; 1976–1982	Succeeded by The Lord Cledwyn of Penrhos
