= The Brocket Arms =

Pub in Ayot St. Lawrence, Hertfordshire, England

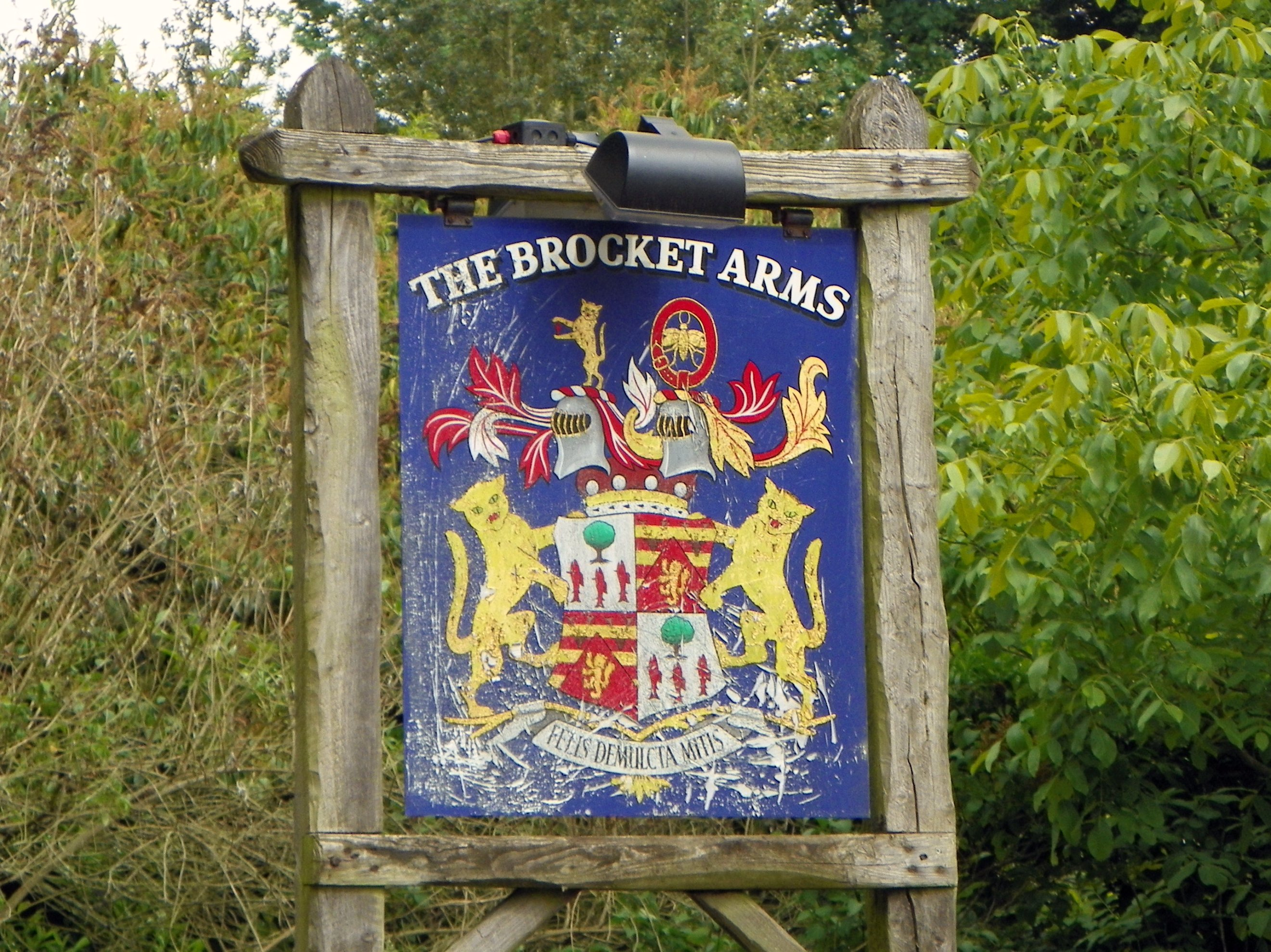
- The Latin motto of the Barons Brocket is Felis demulcta mitis (A stroked cat is gentle).

- Hertfordshire

General information
- Location: Ayot St Lawrence, Hertfordshire, England
- Coordinates: 51°50′14″N 0°15′57″W

The Brocket Arms is a country inn in Ayot St. Lawrence, Hertfordshire, England. According to Historic England, the timber-framed building is probably early sixteenth century, although an earlier date has been claimed.

The Brocket Arms is near Old St Lawrence Church, and, was supposedly "the monastic quarters" for the church until the Reformation. Another claim is that it was a "stop off point for pilgrims" on their way to St Albans Abbey.

== Hauntings ==
It is said to be haunted by a priest who was tried and hanged in the building. Others say it is of a monk who hanged himself at the inn.

== See also ==
- Brocket Hall
