= New St Lawrence Church, Ayot St Lawrence =

Coordinates: 51.837956°N 0.271724°W

St Lawrence Church, Ayot St Lawrence
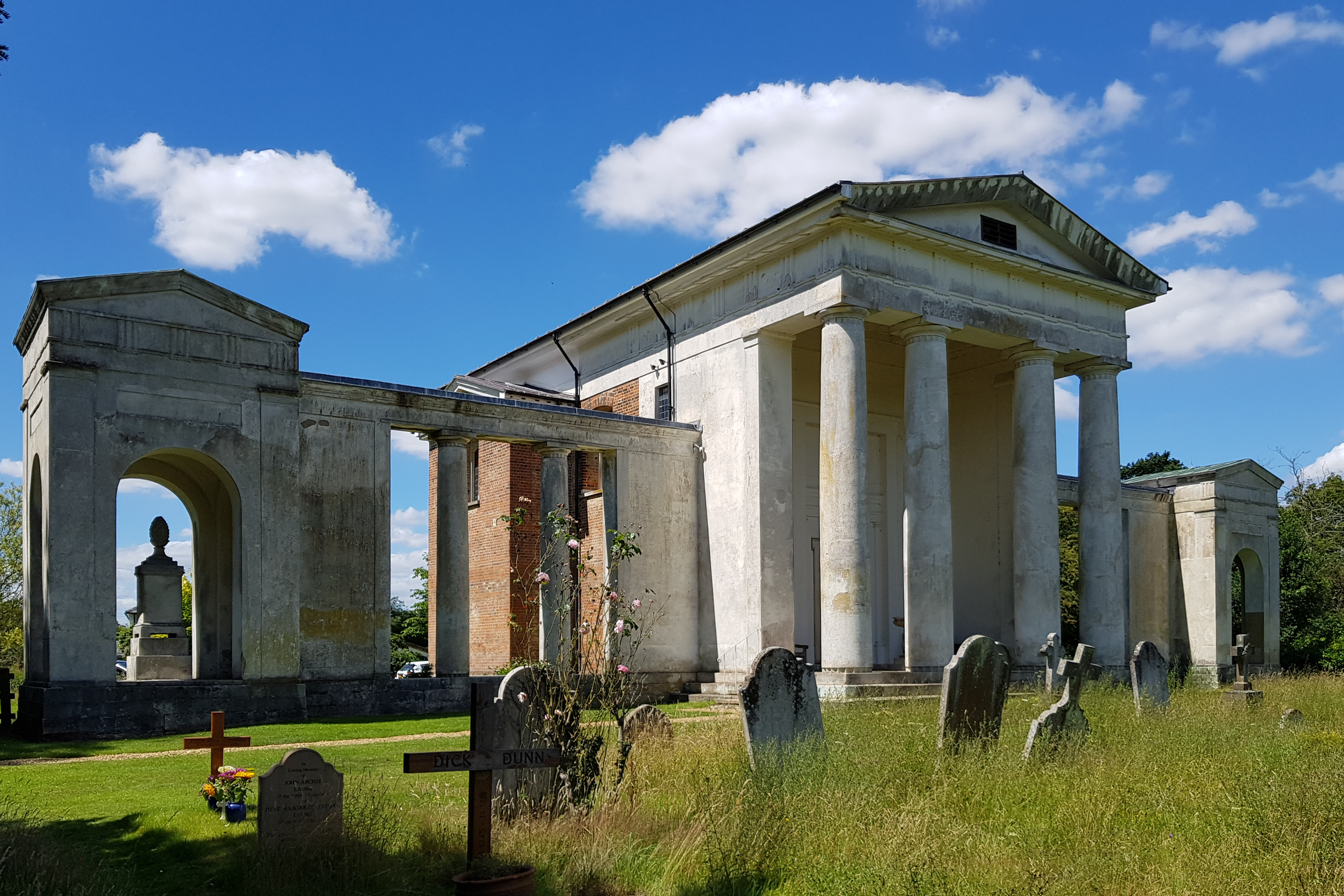
- St Lawrence Church, Ayot St Lawrence
- OS grid reference: TL 19171 16895
- Location: Hertfordshire
- Country: England
- Denomination: Church of England
- Website: Ayot St Lawrence

History
- Status: Parish church

Architecture
- Functional status: Active, but only one regular service a month
- Heritage designation: Grade I listed
- Designated: 1967
- Style: Grecian Revival
- Years built: 1778, consecrated 1779

Specifications
- Capacity: 120
- Materials: Brick & stucco. There is limited use of stone.

Administration
- Province: Canterbury
- Diocese: St Albans
- Deanery: Wheathampstead

St Lawrence Church is an eighteenth-century, neoclassical church in Ayot St Lawrence, Hertfordshire, England. It is also known as New St Lawrence Church and St Lawrence Palladian to distinguish it from the ruined Old St Lawrence Church nearby. The church is a Grade I listed building.

== History ==
Sir Lionel Lyde, 1st Baronet inherited a country home, Ayot House near the old church. He was a wealthy man with income from tobacco plantations which used slave labour and from the transatlantic slave trade itself. He decided that a derelict gothic church would look picturesque and so ordered the original village church to be demolished. When the Bishop of Lincoln heard of this he attempted to stop Lyde, but it was to no avail. Lyde then built the new church in 1778. The front of the church with its portico and screens of columns is designed to be viewed from Ayot House, across a parkland setting.

As his architect, he chose Nicholas Revett, the co-author of The Antiquities of Athens and Other Monuments of Greece, a multi-volume publication which appeared from 1762. Revett had visited Greece to study its architectural heritage. One of the sources of inspiration for the church may have been a temple on the island of Delos. The church was given Grade I listed status in 1967.

== Architecture ==
The style of the church has been described as Palladian, although this is something of a misnomer as, in contrast to Revett, Palladio never visited Greece. Palladio was an expert on Roman architecture, and the Palladian style was derived only indirectly from Greek architecture. There is some debate as to how Revett's neoclassicism should be categorised. Greek Revival is arguably not the ideal term, and some scholars prefer "Grecian revival" (the term used by Historic England in the building's heritage listing).

The interior of the building has a Greek cross plan. Because of the orientation of the building to face Ayot House, liturgical east and west do not coincide with geography. The chancel and altar are at the west end of the church. Despite the eye-catching facade, the church's interior is relatively small, having a capacity of about 120, which reflects the population of the parish.

== Mausolea ==
On either side of the church is a mausoleum for Lionel Lyde and his wife Rachel. Lyde is alleged to have said of this arrangement that ‘since the Church united us in life, she can make amends by separating us in death’. The urns are raised on tall plinths and sheltered by aedicules.
