= Sir Lyonel Lyde, 1st Baronet =

English tobacco merchant

Sir Lyonel Lyde, 1st Baronet (1724–1791), also known as Lionel Lyde, was a tobacco merchant.

Lyde was born in Bristol, where his father served as mayor. The Lyde family had interests in the tobacco plantations of Virginia and in slave trading. Historic England describes Lyde as a tobacco merchant and a director of the Bank of England, but also indicates that the Lyde fortune came from the slave trade. Lyonel and his brother Samuel formed a partnership dealing with the family's business affairs in London. Lyonel was made a director of the Bank of England in the 1760s. The American War of Independence subsequently created difficult conditions for the tobacco trade.

== Homes ==
Lyonel acquired a country estate at Ayot St Lawrence, which had belonged to his uncle and father-in-law Cornelius Lyde. He partially demolished the existing village church, and replaced it with a neo-classical building nearby. The new St Lawrence's Church features twin mausolea for Lyonel and his wife Rachel.

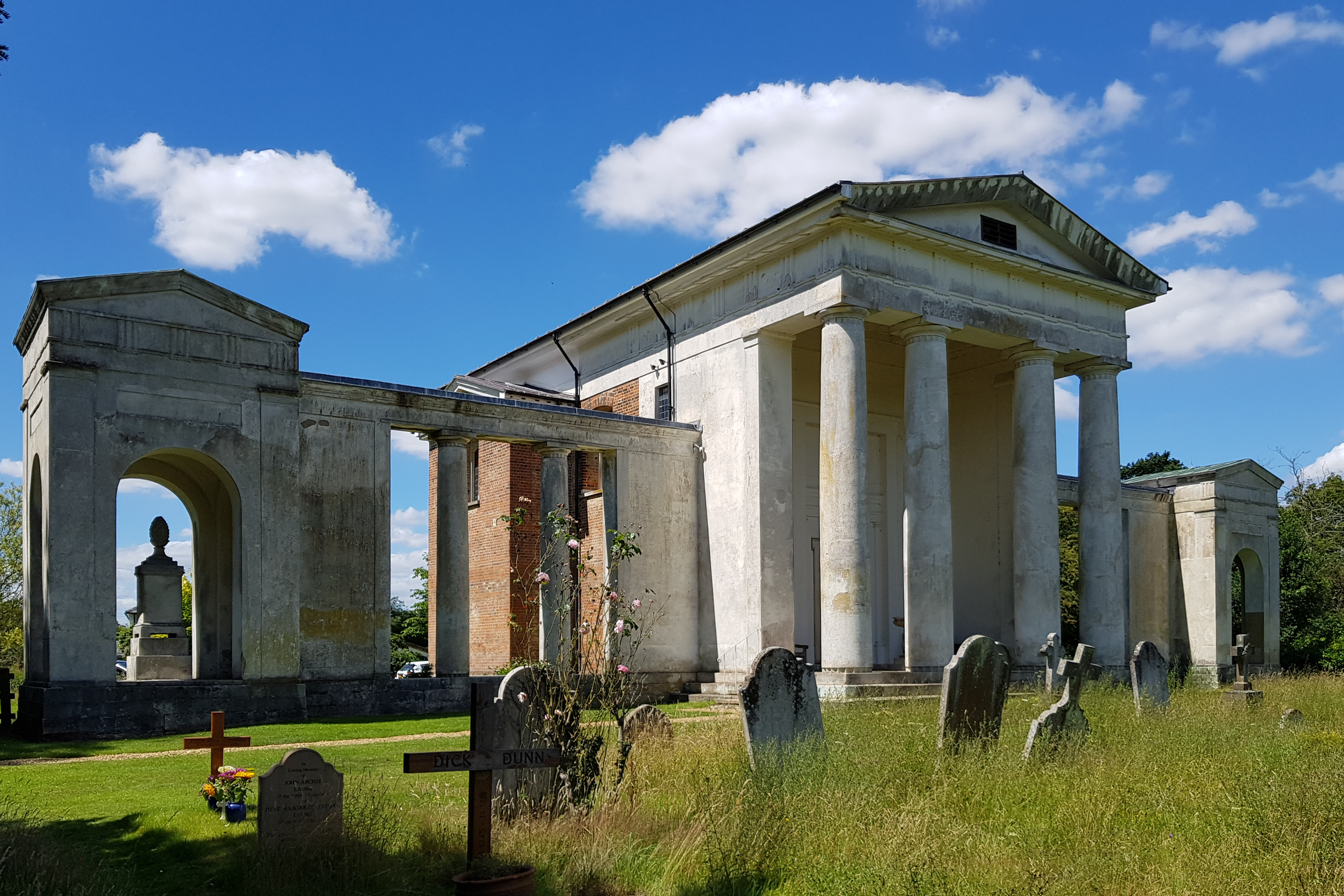
New St Lawrence Church

Lyde and his brother also leased houses in Bedford Square, a fashionable new development in London.

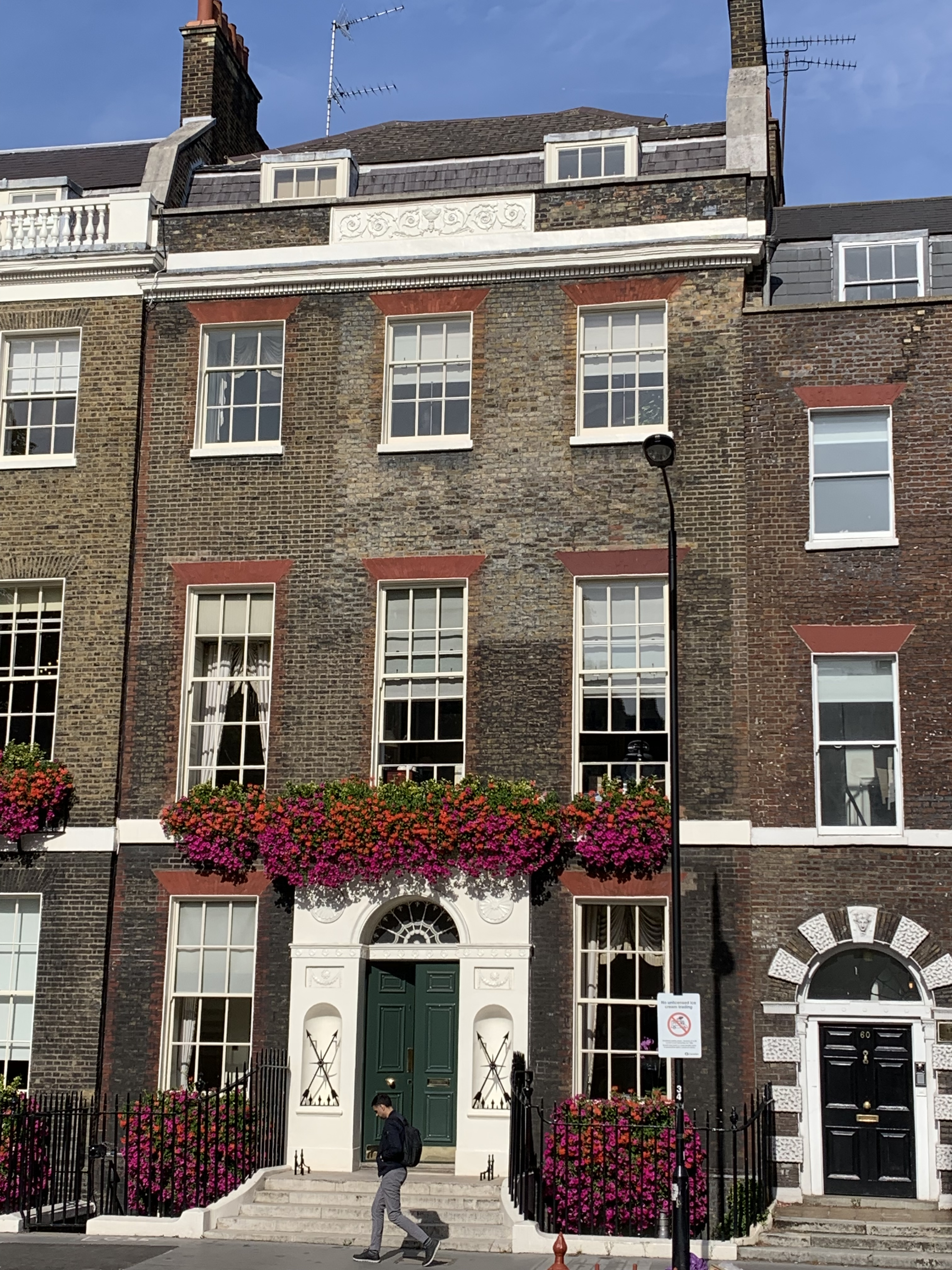
Bedford Square

== Baronetcy and legacy ==
Escutcheon of the Lyde baronets

A baronetcy was created for Lyde on 13 October 1772; it became extinct upon his death in 1791. The Ayot House estate passed to relatives, some of whom changed their name to Lyde. For example, Lionel Ames, who inherited the estate in 1806, assumed the surname and arms of Lyde.

Baronetage of Great Britain
New creation	Baronet (of Ayot St Lawrence); 1772–1791	Extinct
Preceded by Wright baronets	Lyde baronets of Ayot St Lawrence; 13 October 1772	Succeeded by Sutton baronets
