= Zoe Dyke =

British silk maker

- with silk cocoons
- Born: Millicent Zoe Bond; 6 February 1896; Leyton, Essex, England
- Died: 12 February 1975 (aged 79); Herne Bay, Kent, England

Millicent Zoe Hart Dyke (née Bond; 6 February 1896 – 12 February 1975) was a pioneer of British sericulture. The silk created in her businesses has been used by British royalty, including in the wedding dresses of Queen Elizabeth II and Diana, Princess of Wales.

== Life ==
Millicent Zoe Bond was born in Leyton but by the age of four she was living in Poole in Dorset, where she developed an interest in silk worms. Her parents were Eliza Josephine and Dr Barnabas Mayston Bond. She attended St Paul's Girls' School and in 1912 she went to a college in Paris.

In 1922 she married Oliver Hart Dyke, son of Sir William Hart Dyke, 7th Baronet. Sir William owned Lullingstone Castle in Kent and was active in politics and sport. Oliver Hart Dyke became an engineer and in 1931 upon his father's death inherited the family home and the baronetcy. Dyke used the attic to again breed silk worms and Victor built a machine to process the thread. By 1936 Zoe's silk worms were making her a leading expert and Queen Mary visited to see her work. She was given a medal by the Royal Society of Arts.

Dyke and Oliver's marriage ended in 1944. Oliver later remarried. The production of silk had more or less ceased during the war but in 1946 it began again with a limited company. Oliver was briefly involved but it was Dyke's company as it became again a centre for silk enthusiasts. In the 1950s Oliver and his second wife returned to the Lullingstone estate where the emphasis was creating a new tourist business unrelated to silk. Dyke moved away with the business to Ayot House in Ayot St Lawrence, Hertfordshire.

Dyke's company created silk for the coronation robe of King George VI; other important royal commissions included the wedding dress of Princess Elizabeth, the coronation robes of Elizabeth II, and the wedding dress of Lady Diana Spencer.

Dyke died in a nursing home in Herne Bay in 1975.
