= Ayot St Lawrence =

Village in Hertfordshire, England

Coordinates: 51.83434°N 0.26709°W

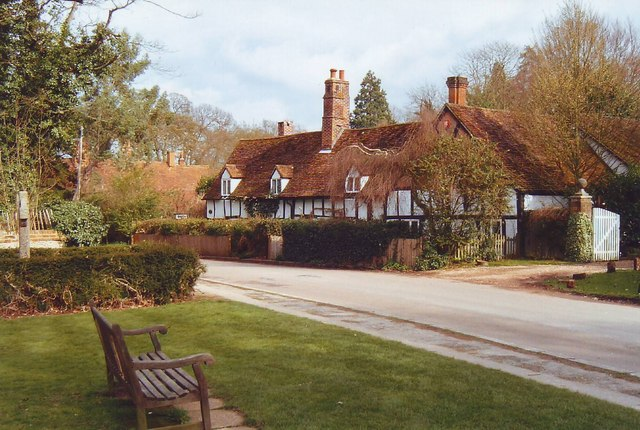
- Ayot St. Lawrence village centre

- Location within Hertfordshire
- OS grid reference: TL195165
- District: Welwyn Hatfield
- Shire county: Hertfordshire
- Region: East
- Country: England
- Sovereign state: United Kingdom
- Post town: WELWYN
- Postcode district: AL6
- Dialling code: 01438
- Police: Hertfordshire
- Fire: Hertfordshire
- Ambulance: East of England
- UK Parliament: Welwyn Hatfield

Ayot St Lawrence is a small English village and civil parish in Hertfordshire, two miles (three kilometres) west of Welwyn. There are several other Ayots in the area, including Ayot Green and Ayot St Peter, where the census population of Ayot St Lawrence was included in 2011.

== Heritage ==
George Bernard Shaw lived in the village at Shaw's Corner from 1906 until his death in 1950; his ashes are scattered there. The house is open to the public as a National Trust property.

Other residents of the village included Shaw's friend, neighbour and bibliographer Stephen Winsten (1893–1991) and his wife, the artist Clare Winsten (1894–1989).

During the 1950s, the silk-maker Zoe Dyke (1896–1975) moved her business to Ayot House. The historical novelist, biographer and children's writer Carola Oman, Lady Lenanton (1897–1978), lived at Bride Hall with her husband. She died there on 11 June 1978.

== Amenities ==
The village has a timber-framed public house, The Brocket Arms, which may date back to the early 16th century. It also offers meals and accommodation.

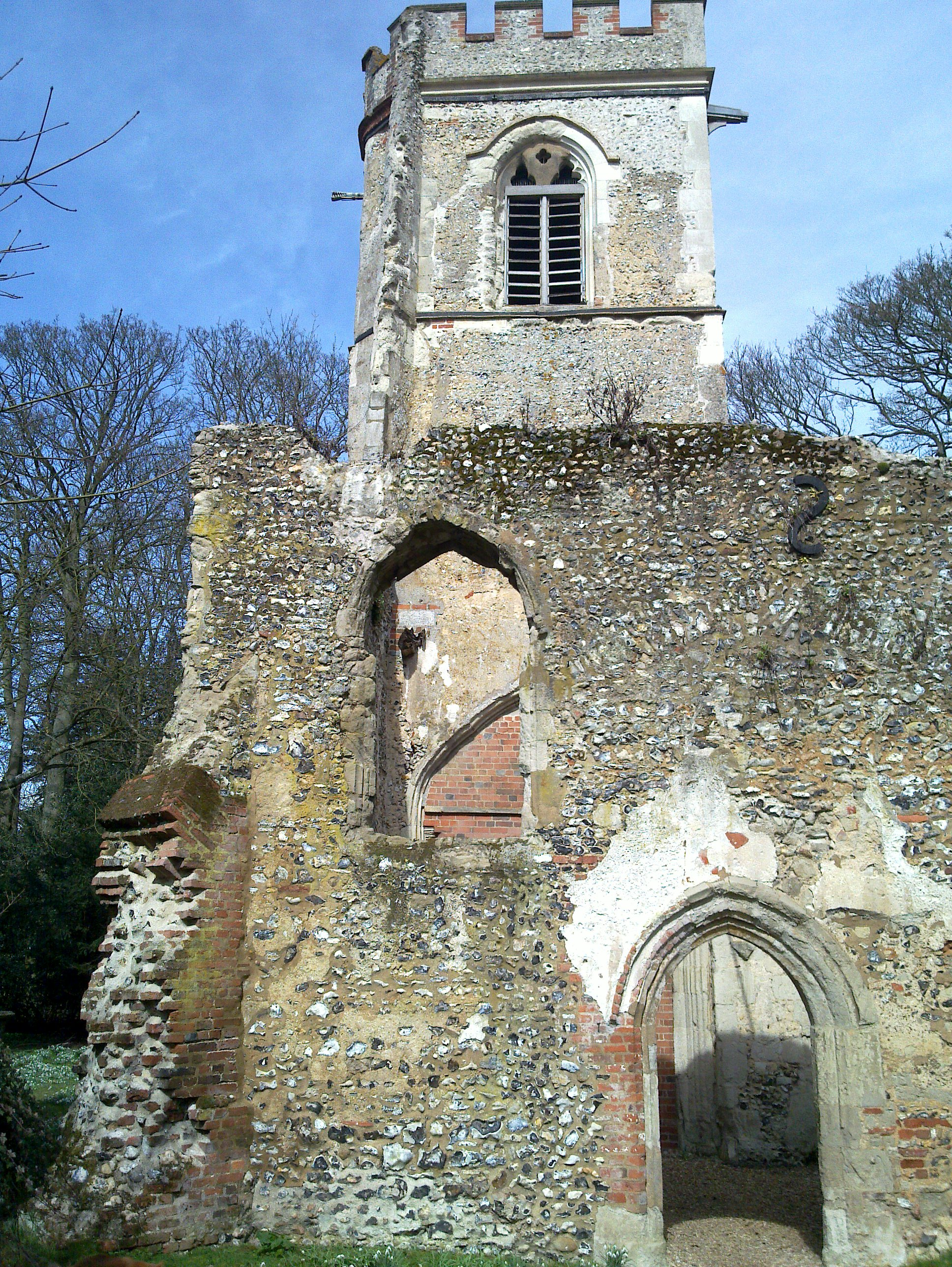
The old Norman church, in March 2010

The village has two churches:

- Old St Lawrence Church, in the centre of the village, was partially demolished in 1775, because it was obstructing the view from Sir Lionel Lyde's new home.

Field Marshal Frederick Rudolph Lambart, 10th Earl of Cavan (1865–1946), a British Army officer and Chief of the Imperial General Staff, is buried in the churchyard.

- New St Lawrence Church was designed in a neo-classical style by Nicholas Revett and features a Palladian-style frontage with Doric columns.

== Gallery ==
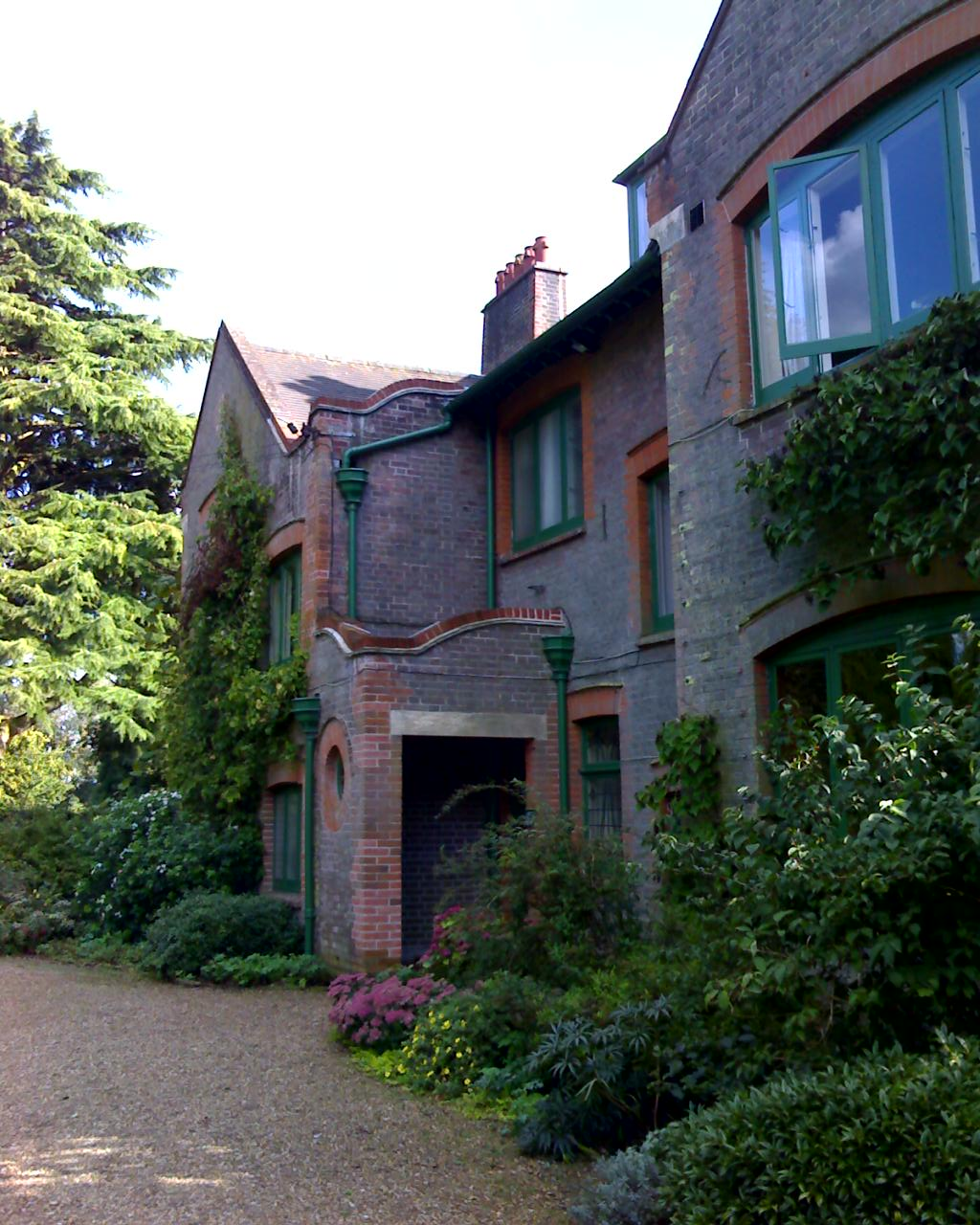
Shaw's Corner

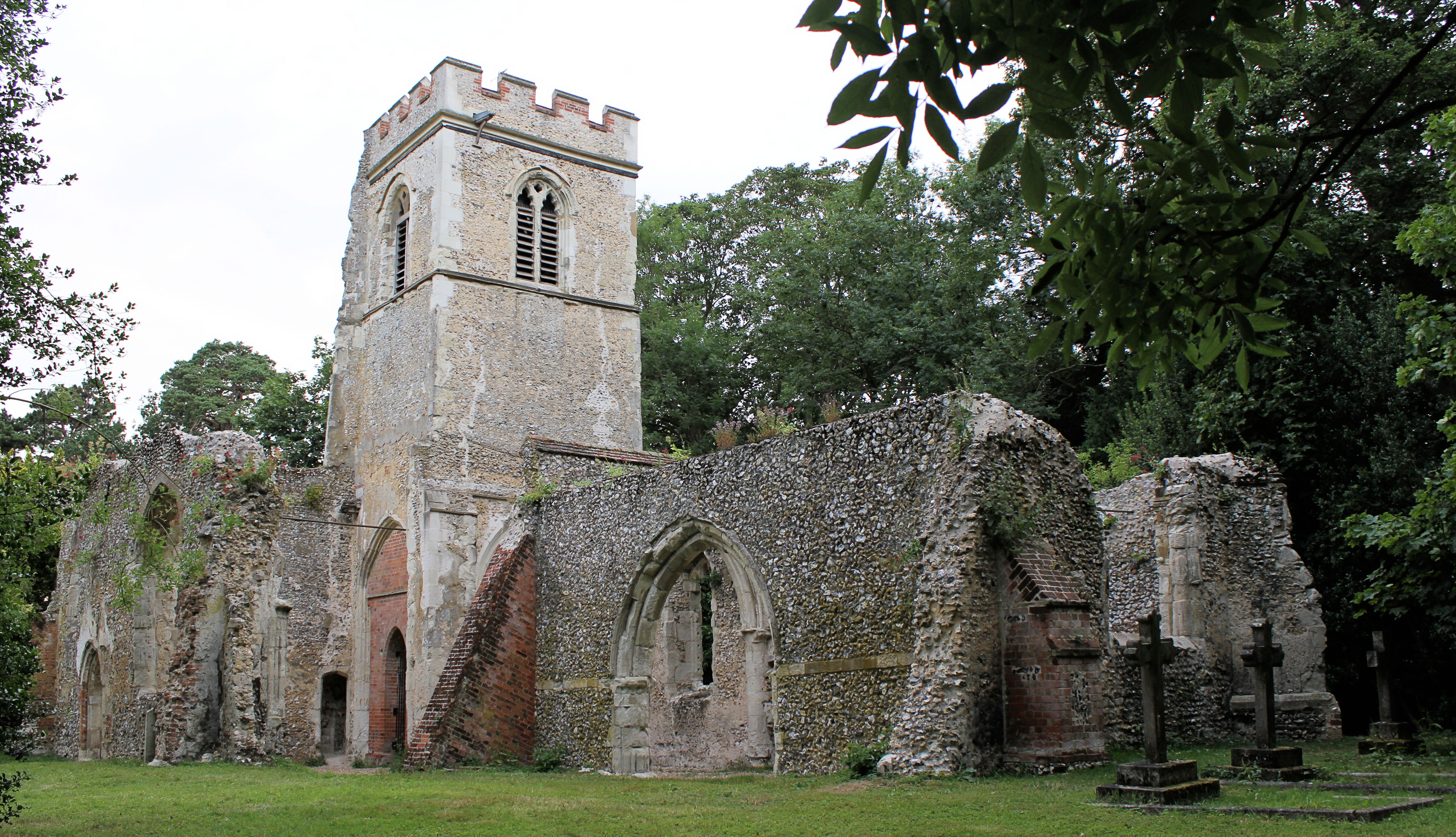
Ruins of the old Church
