= Old St Lawrence Church, Ayot St Lawrence =

Ruined church in Ayot St Lawrence, Hertfordshire, England

Coordinates: 51.837738°N 0.267306°W

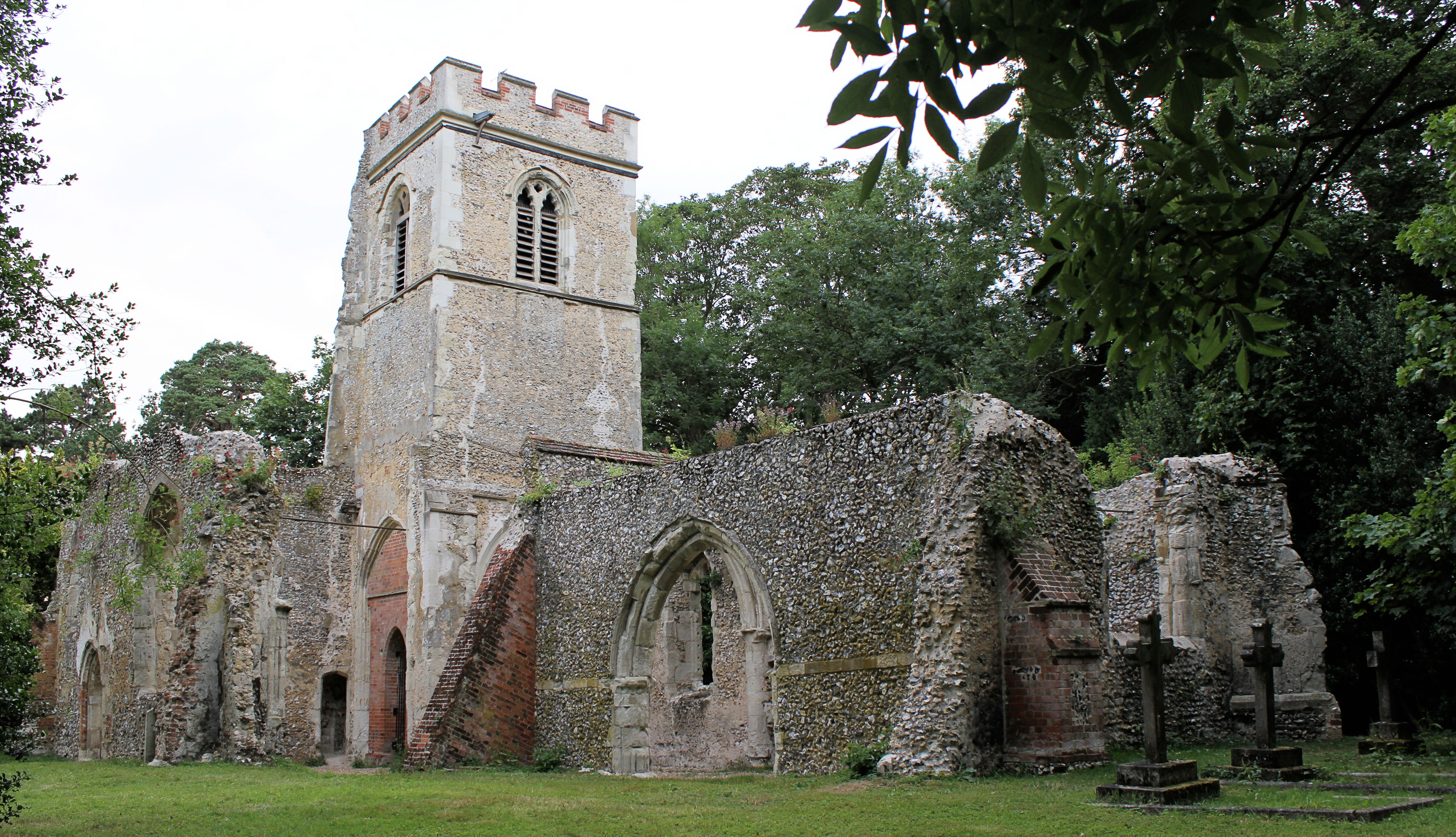
The church is roofless with the exception of the tower

Old St Lawrence Church is a ruined church in Ayot St Lawrence, Hertfordshire, England, which dates to the 12th century. It has been so-called since the 18th century to distinguish it from the New St Lawrence Church nearby. It is as a Grade II* listed building.

== History ==
The church was built in the 12th century. The nave was partially rebuilt in the 14th century. By the 15th century, the north aisle, chancel, and tower had been built. The church is faced with rubble stones. The last baptism to take place at Old St Lawrence Church was on the 21st February 1773 for Susan George.

Sir Lionel Lyde, 1st Baronet had inherited a country home, Ayot House, close by. He decided that a derelict gothic church would look picturesque and so ordered it to be demolished. When the Bishop of Lincoln heard of this he attempted to stop Lyde, but it was to no avail. Lyde then built a new church nearby in 1778 in neoclassical style. The project was partially funded by wealth he had gained through the transatlantic slave trade. The ruin was given Grade II* listed status in 1967.

Although Lionel Lyde and his wife Rachel are commemorated at the new church, the old churchyard remained in use. Burials include Rudolph Lambart, 10th Earl of Cavan (1865 – 1946), whose maternal grandfather was rector of Ayot St Lawrence. Earl Cavan was a Field marshal and his resting place is registered by the Commonwealth War Graves Commission.
