= James "Athenian" Stuart =

Scottish archaeologist, architect and artist (1713–1788)

James Stuart FRS FSA
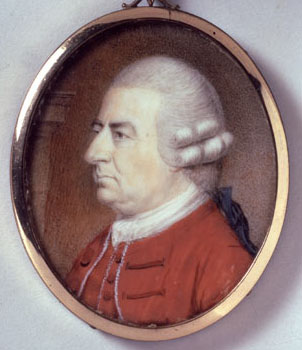
- Born: 1713; Ludgate Hill, London, England
- Died: 2 February 1788; Leicester Square, London, England
- Occupation: Architect
- Buildings: Interiors Spencer House, London; Garden Buildings Shugborough Hall; All Saints' Church Nuneham House

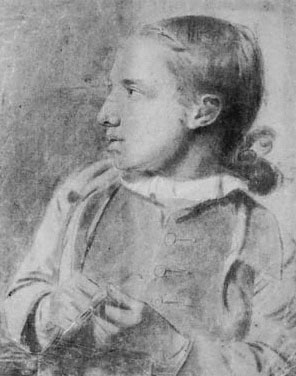
Stuart as a child, self-portrait

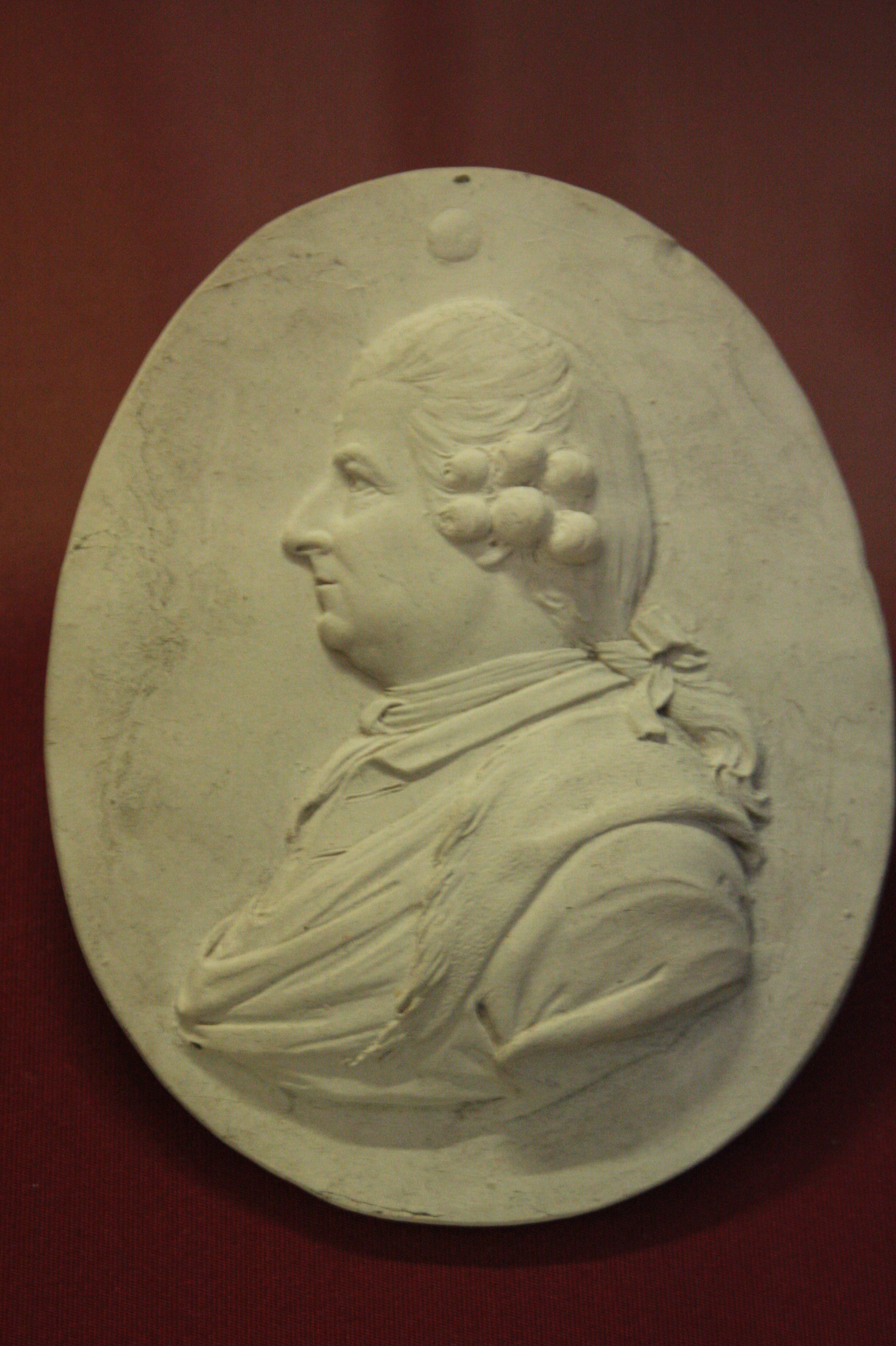
Miniature by Josiah Wedgwood

James "Athenian" Stuart FRS FSA (1713 – 2 February 1788) was a British archaeologist, architect and artist. He was best known for publishing carefully measured architectural prints, including the smallest details, of key buildings of Ancient Greek architecture in The Antiquities of Athens and Other Monuments of Greece (1762), a pioneering work in the development of Neoclassicism in Britain.

== Life ==
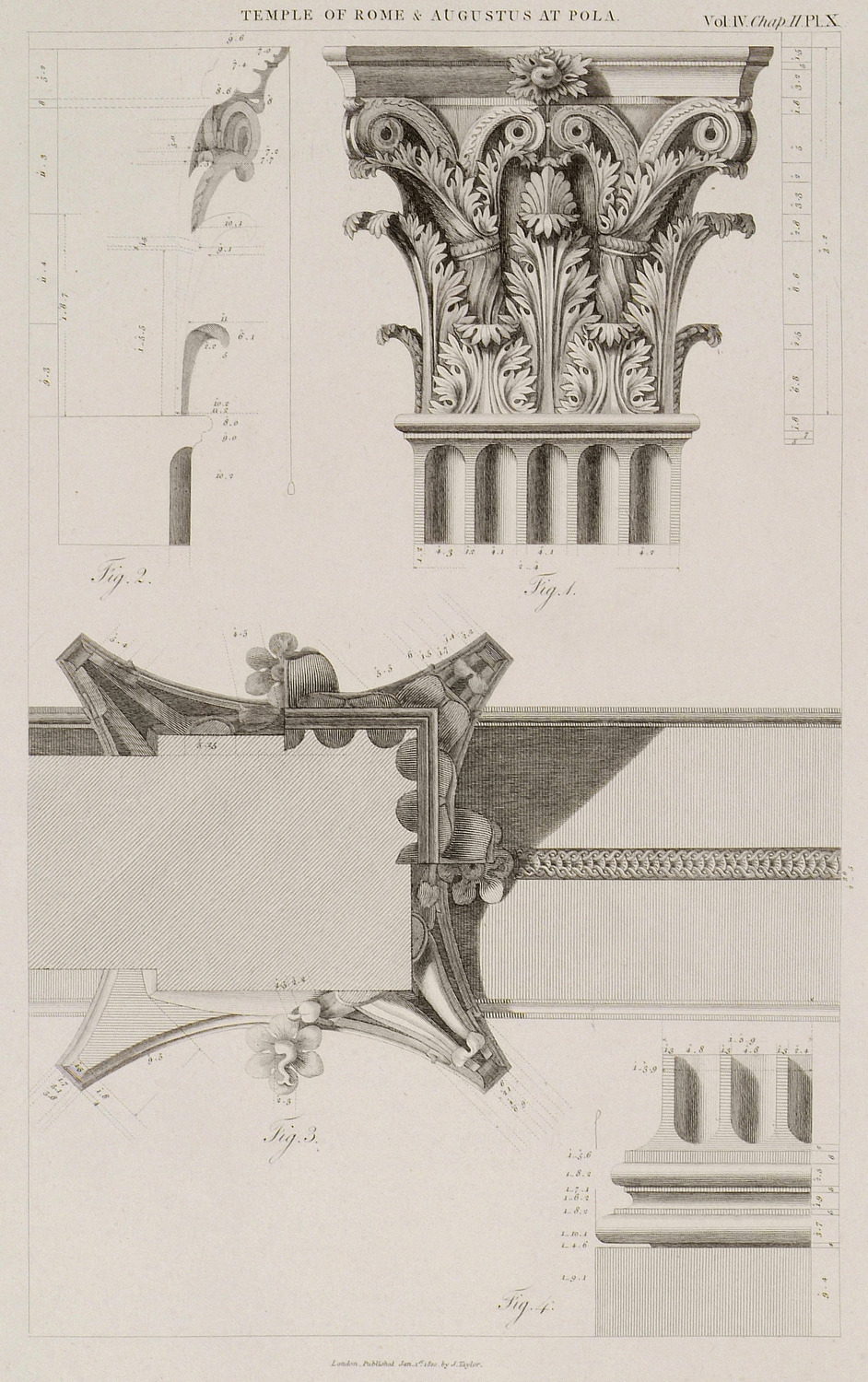
Stuart's highly detailed engravings of detail from classical architecture were studied intensely by architects

=== Early life ===
Stuart was born in 1713 in Creed Lane, Ludgate Street, London, to a Scottish sailor who died when he was young. Proving a talented artist while his family was in poverty, he was apprenticed to a fan painter to support the family financially. However, in around 1742, he was able to travel to Italy (albeit on foot) for his artistic improvement, working there as a cicerone and a painter, learning Latin, Italian and Greek, and studying Italian and Roman art and architecture. There he produced his first major work, his illustrated treatise on the Egyptian obelisk of Psammetichus II within A. M. Bandini's De obelisco Caesaris Augusti, and met Nicholas Revett, a young Suffolk gentleman and amateur architect on his Grand Tour.

=== Naples and Greece ===
In 1748 Stuart joined Revett, Gavin Hamilton and the architect Matthew Brettingham the Younger on a trip to Naples to study the ancient ruins and, from there, they travelled through the Balkans (stopping at Pula) to Greece. Visiting Salonica, Athens, and an Ionic temple on the River Ilissos among others, they made accurate measurements and drawings of the ancient ruins.

=== Antiquities of Athens ===
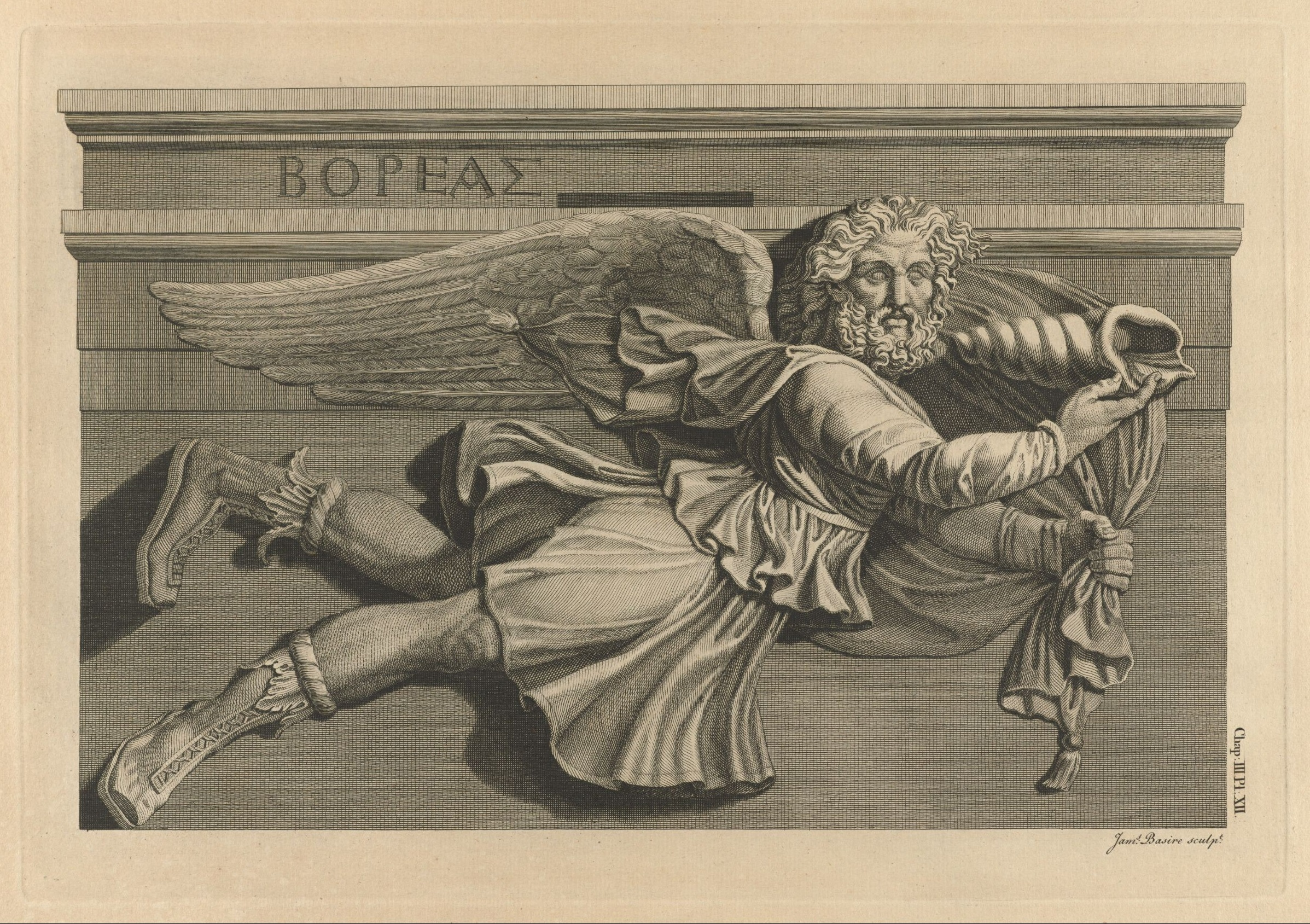
Relief of Boreas from the Tower of the Winds in Athens, illustration from The Antiquities of Athens, 1762

Stuart and Revett returned to London in 1755 and published their work, The Antiquities of Athens and Other Monuments of Greece, in 1762. There were more than five hundred subscribers to its first volume and, although few of the subscribers were architects or builders, thus limiting its impact as a design sourcebook, it later helped fuel the Greek Revival in European architecture. Its illustrations were among the first of their kind and the work was welcomed by antiquaries, scholars, and gentleman amateurs. William Hogarth satirised its fastidious depiction of architectural detail in his 1761 engraving Five Orders of Periwigs.

In April 1758 he was elected a Fellow of the Royal Society as "Mr James Stuart of Grosvenor Square History painter and Architect, eminent in his profession and who hath particularly applyed himself to the study of antiquity, during a long residence in Greece and Italy, as will appear in a work now publishing by him in four volumes in folio, entitled, "The antiquities remaining in the city of Athens and province of Attica"."

=== Work in England ===
On his return to England, he also acted as an interior designer, medal designer, and architect, creating the first tripod in metal since antiquity, building and remodelling country houses, garden buildings, and town houses (e.g. Shugborough Hall, Hagley Hall, Spencer House, and the Temple of the Winds), creating book illustrations, designing commemorative medals and tomb monuments, and being appointed Surveyor to the Royal Naval Hospital, Greenwich.

=== Later life ===
Stuart's more and more chaotic business practices (possibly to be explained by his chronic gout and deteriorating health, and to his coming into a private fortune – a contemporary report on his death in The World stated that "unexpectedly to most people, [he] has died possessed of much property, chiefly on mortgage on new buildings in Marybone") attracted adverse comment from the late 1760s. By the early 1780s, his devoting the afternoons not to business but to drinking (sources state he "regularly frequented a public-house on the north side of Leicester-fields, of the sign of the feathers" and that "his face declared him to be fond of what is called friendly society" – J. T. Smith, Nollekens and his Times, 1929, 27) and playing skittles was even commented on by his friends. Enemies even accused him of 'Epicurianism' in reference to his alcoholism and recent second marriage at 67 to Elizabeth, a maidservant of 20, by whom he had five children, of whom two died before him. (His first marriage had been to someone described in different places as his housekeeper and as a 'Grecian lady'.)

Stuart continued to work on and off, and returned to working on The Antiquities of Athens, though it was still unfinished at the time of his death in 1788, with the final volume only appearing in 1816, when the Greek Revival architecture it had fostered was starting to become the dominant force in British architecture. He died suddenly on 2 February 1788 at his house on the south side of Leicester Square, and was buried in the crypt of nearby St Martin-in-the-Fields.

His London buildings played some part in popularising Neo-classical taste. The Antiquities of Athens allowed architects, sculptors and designers in Europe and America for the first time to use Neo-Classicism without having to go to Greece themselves and acted as a sourcebook for them for the next two centuries.

== Exhibition ==
From 16 November 2006 – 18 February 2007, the Bard Graduate Center in New York State exhibited James “Athenian” Stuart, 1713-1788 The Rediscovery of Antiquity. The exhibition explored the development of neoclassicism through his sketchbooks, drawings for projects, and various other designs. The exhibition was accompanied by a catalogue by Susan Weber (ISBN 978-0-300-11713-4) and later travelled to the Victoria & Albert Museum in London (22 March– 24 June 2007).

== Bibliography ==
- James Stuart & Nicholas Revett, The Antiquities of Athens and Other Monuments of Greece (London, 1762). ISBN 1-4021-5984-6 (2002 reprint edition. According to at least one review, this modern "facsimile" is incomplete.)
- James Stuart, Critical observations on the buildings and improvements of London (London, 1771). ISBN 0-404-70189-2 (1992 reprint edition.)
- In 2007 "The Antiquities of Athens and Other Monuments of Greece" was published as a hard bound reprint edition by Princeton Architectural Press. It is represented as a complete reprint. Running in size: 9 x 12 in or 22.9 cm by 30.5 cm. 496 pages with 400 illustrations.

== Gallery of works ==
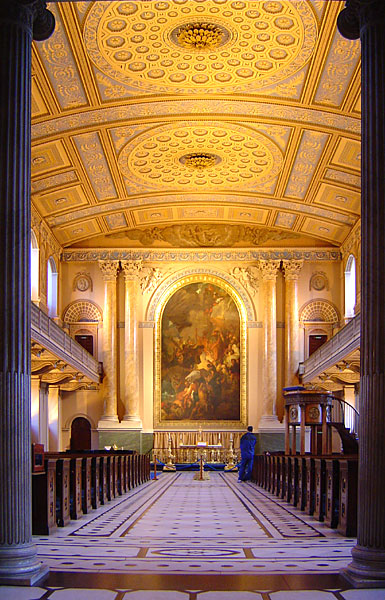
Chapel, Greenwich Hospital

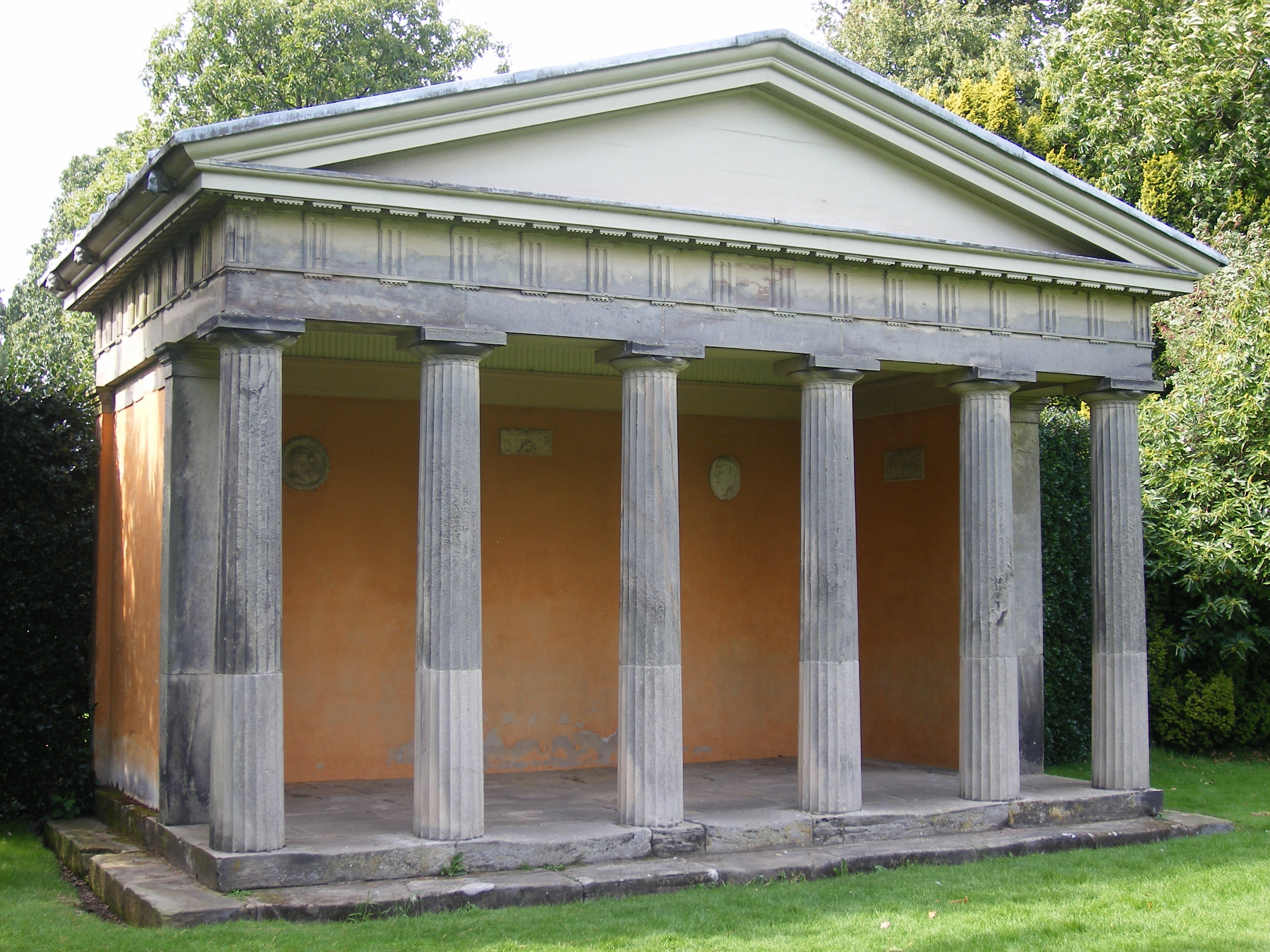
Doric Temple, Shugborough Hall, c. 1762, a reduced Temple of Hephaestus

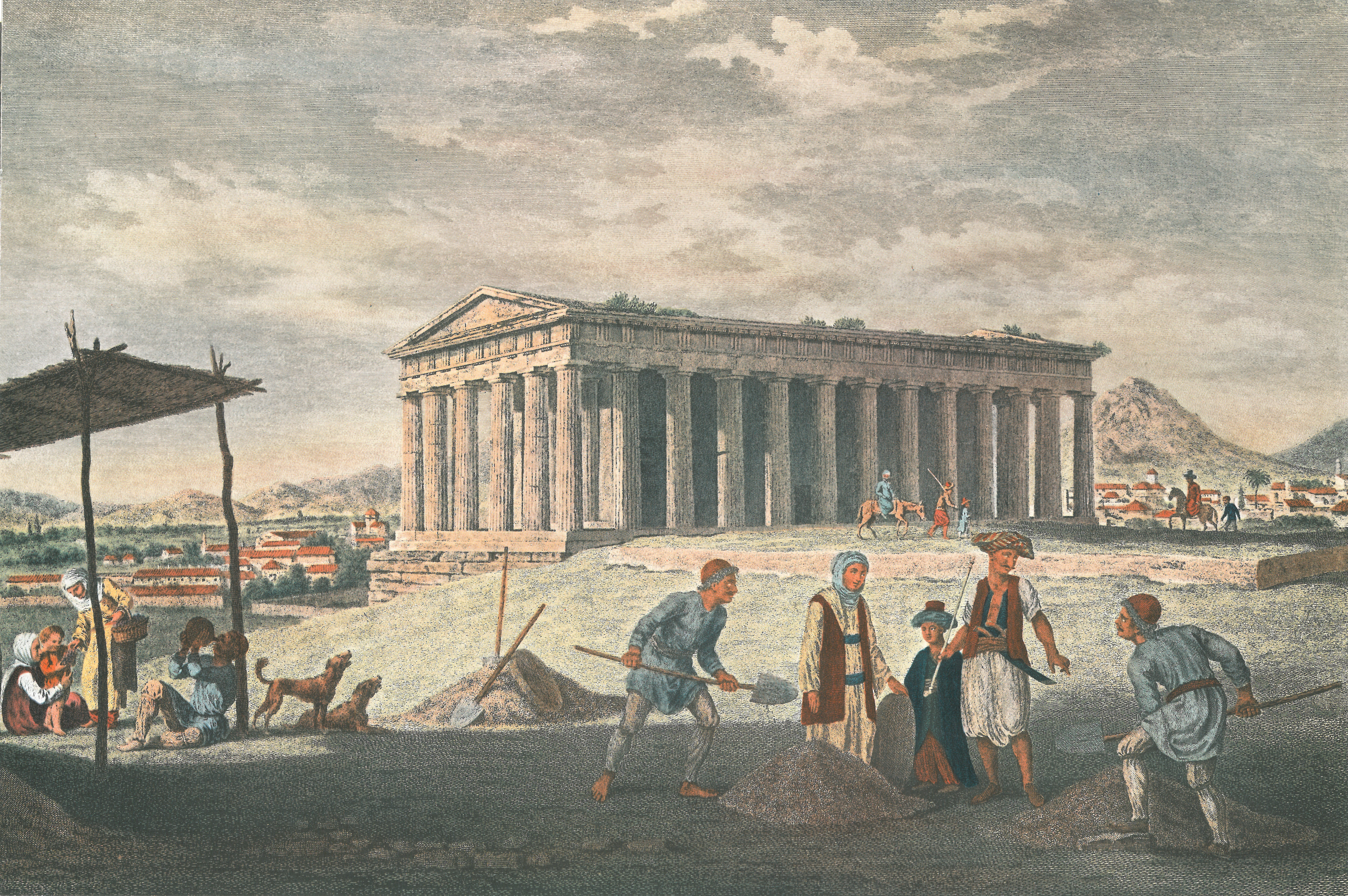
Temple of Hephaestus in Athens painted by Stuart

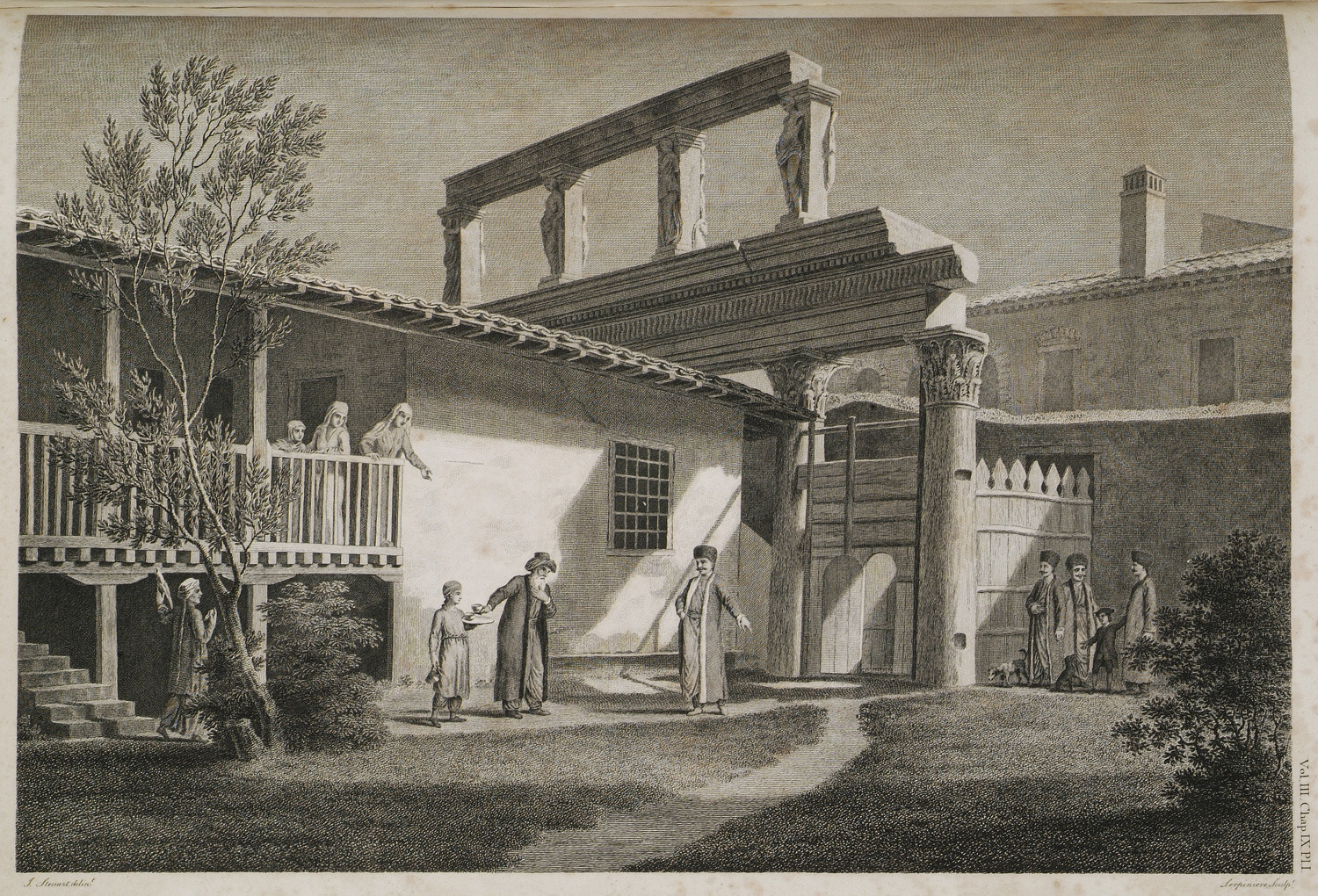
Las Incantadas in Salonica by Stuart, 1794
