= Richard Chandler (antiquary) =

English antiquary (1737–1810)

Richard Chandler (1737 – 9 February 1810) was an English antiquary.

== Education ==
Chandler was born in Elson, Hampshire. He was educated at Winchester College. He matriculated at The Queen's College, Oxford in 1755. He moved to Magdalen College as a demy in 1757, and graduated B.A. there in 1759, M.A. 1761.

== Early work ==
His first work consisted of fragments from the minor Greek poets, with notes (Elegiaca Graeca, 1759); and in 1763 he published a fine edition of the inscriptions among the Arundel marbles, Marmora Oxoniensia, with a Latin translation, and a number of suggestions for supplying the lacunae.

== Antiquarian work ==
In 1764 he was introduced by Robert Wood, who had produced the Ruins of Palmyra to the Society of Dilettanti and sent by them, accompanied by Nicholas Revett, an architect, and William Pars, a painter, to explore the antiquities of Ionia and Greece (1764-1766).

The Society's brief, drawn up 17 May 1764 was that the travelers make Smyrna their headquarters, and from there "..to make excursions to the several remains of antiquity in that neighborhood; to make exact plans and measurements, to make accurate drawings of the bas-reliefs and ornaments..copying all the inscriptions you shall meet with, and keeping minute diaries."

Having explored numerous sites in Anatolia and Ionian Islands, they continued to Athens, where they purchased fragments of sculpture from the Parthenon: "We purchased two fine fragments of the frieze which we found inserted over the doorways in the town, and were presented with a beautiful trunk which had fallen from the metopes, and lay neglected in the garden of a Turk".

The result of their labours were the Ionian Antiquities in two magnificent folios published by the Dilettanti in 1769, and, later, Chandler's record of the tour, Travels in Greece, or an Account of a Tour Made at the Expense of the Society Of Dillettanti (1776).

== Later life ==
He subsequently held several church preferments, including the rectory of Tylehurst, in Berkshire, where he died in 1810.

Other works by Chandler were Inscriptiones Antiquae pleraeque nondum editae (Oxford, 1774); Travels in Asia Minor (1775); Travels in Greece (1776); History of Ilium (1803), in which he asserted the accuracy of Homer's geography. His Life of Bishop Waynflete, Lord High Chancellor to Henry VI, appeared in 1811.

A complete edition (with notes by Nicholas Revett) of the Travels in Asia Minor and Greece was published by Ralph Churton (Oxford, 1825), with an Account of the Author.
