= Ayot Park =

Park and garden in Ayot St Hertfordshire, Hertfordshire, England

Ayot Park is a grade II listed park and garden at Ayot St Lawrence in Hertfordshire, England. It contains the grade II* listed Ayot House along with an earlier manor house and a walled kitchen garden which are also listed.

The estate was acquired in 1723 by Cornelius Lyde and after his death it passed to Sir Lionel Lyde who was both his nephew and son-in-law. Sir Lionel built the grade I listed St Lawrence Church which faces the house across the park. It was built in 1778 and consecrated the following year.

== Ayot House ==
The red-brick house, located at 51.8388°N 0.2674°W, is described by Historic England as dating from the early-mid 18th century. It appears to be an early 18th-century house extended in the mid 18th century.

In the 1950s the house was used by Zoe Dyke's silk farming business, which relocated from Lullingstone Castle. Later it was divided into apartments.

== Access ==
There is a path across the park to St Lawrence Church.

The walled garden and other gardens associated with the manor house are sometimes opened to the public under the auspices of the National Gardens Scheme.
