= Nicholas Revett =

British architect (1720–1804)

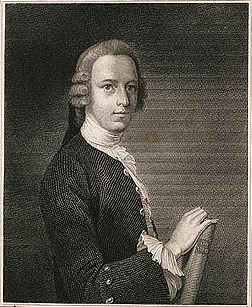
Nicholas Revett, reproduction of a portrait in oils, from his Antiquities of Athens.

Nicholas Revett (1720–1804) was a British architect. Revett is best known for his work with James "Athenian" Stuart documenting the ruins of ancient Athens. He is sometimes described as an amateur architect, but he played an important role in the revival of Greek architecture.

Revett is believed to have been born in Framlingham, Suffolk, although his family lived at Brandeston nearby. He was baptised in the Church of St Michael the Archangel, Framlingham.

He studied with the proto-Neoclassical painter Marco Benefial.

He died in London, and was buried in Brandeston.

== First expedition ==
Revett met James Stuart in Italy where they had gone to further their artistic education. They decided to travel on to Greece. According to the Dictionary of National Biography, they became acquainted with Sir James Gray, K.B., the British resident at Venice, prior to visiting Greece, and through his agency, they were elected members of the Society of Dilettanti in London. The Society was founded by men including Gray who had been on the Grand Tour: its patronage was to prove important to Revett.

In Greece they stayed mainly in Athens, where they arrived in 1751. They also visited the Aegean Islands including Delos.

== The Antiquities of Athens ==
In England Revett and Stuart prepared their work for publication and found subscribers for The Antiquities of Athens. The project was intended to consist of four volumes, although a supplementary volume also appeared. The illustrations include 368 etched and engraved plates, plans and maps drawn at scale. Although their French rival Julien-David Le Roy published his book about ancient Greek monuments Les Ruines des plus beaux bâtiments de la Grèce before The Antiquities of Athens, the accuracy of Revett and Stuart's work gives their survey a claim to be the first of its kind in studies of ancient Greece; for example, Revett and Stuart were the first Europeans to describe the existence of ancient Greek polychromy.

The first volume, in which the authors are described as "painters and architects", appeared in 1762/3. Revett gave up his interest in the project after the first volume, but Stuart continued to be involved until his death in 1788. The fourth volume appeared in 1816, the year the Elgin Marbles were acquired by the British government.

== Second expedition ==
Revett took part in a second expedition in the 1760s. He travelled with Richard Chandler and others to Greece and Ionia under the auspices of the Society of Dilettanti. (He appears to have fallen out with Stuart after the publication of the first volume of The Antiquities of Athens). The brief, drawn up 17 May 1764 was that the travellers make Smyrna their headquarters, and from there "..to make excursions to the several remains of antiquity in that neighborhood; to make exact plans and measurements, to make accurate drawings of the bas-reliefs and ornaments..copying all the inscriptions you shall meet with, and keeping minute diaries."

== Buildings by Nicholas Revett ==
There are not many buildings attributed to Revett. He considered himself a gentleman and he was probably sufficiently well-off not to have to earn his living, although he is said to have experienced "pecuniary difficulties" towards the end of his life.

=== Additions ===
Revett designed two 'Greek' additions to English country houses which arguably commenced the British 'Greek Revivalist' period in architecture from the 1760s. Both owners were members of the Society of Dilettanti. The properties in question were:

- Standlynch Park, Wiltshire, now known as Trafalgar Park

Revett added a portico to this house which was the home of Henry Dawkins (brother of his friend and fellow explorer, James Dawkins).

- West Wycombe Park, Buckinghamshire

Revett added the west portico to this house in 1771, which was the home of Sir Francis Dashwood. The portico is based on the temple of Bacchus at Teos. The Bacchic theme suited Sir Francis's extravagant conviviality, a hallmark of the Dilettanti. The ceiling is a quotation from one of the structures at Palmyra, as reproduced in Robert Wood's "Ruins of Palmyra". For details see the forthcoming monograph by Jason M. Kelly.

=== Complete building ===
- The Rectory, Mereworth, Kent (sold by the church 1958 and since known as Mere House).

This property was designed in 1780 for the patron of the living Sir Francis Dashwood and is Revett's only known complete domestic building. The builder was Luffman Atterbury, a surveyor who had worked for Dashwood at West Wycombe. Alterations were made c 1830 and 1876 but many of Revett's features remain

=== Church ===
Ayot St Lawrence Church, Hertfordshire (a building of the 1770s) has been singled out for mention, for example by Revett's obituarist in The Gentleman's Magazine, and by Lionel Cust in the Dictionary of National Biography.

== Works ==
- with James Stuart: The Antiquities of Athens (1762).
- Richard Chandler, Nicholas Revett: Travels in Asia Minor and Greece.
- Richard Chandler, Nicholas Revett, W. Pars: Ionian Antiquities London 1769. .
