= 1979 United Kingdom local elections =

- 3 May 1979

All 36 metropolitan boroughs, all 296 English districts and all 37 Welsh districts
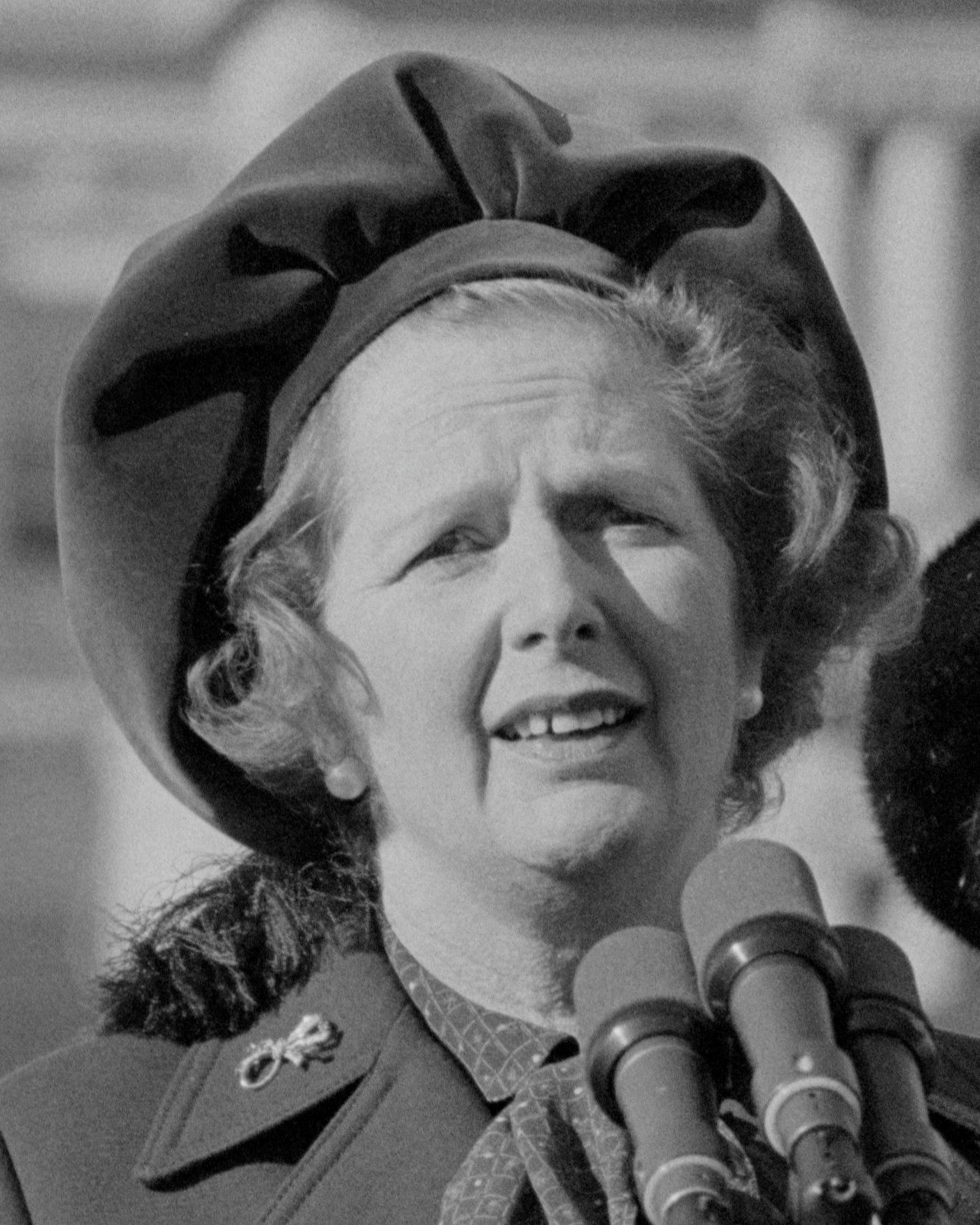

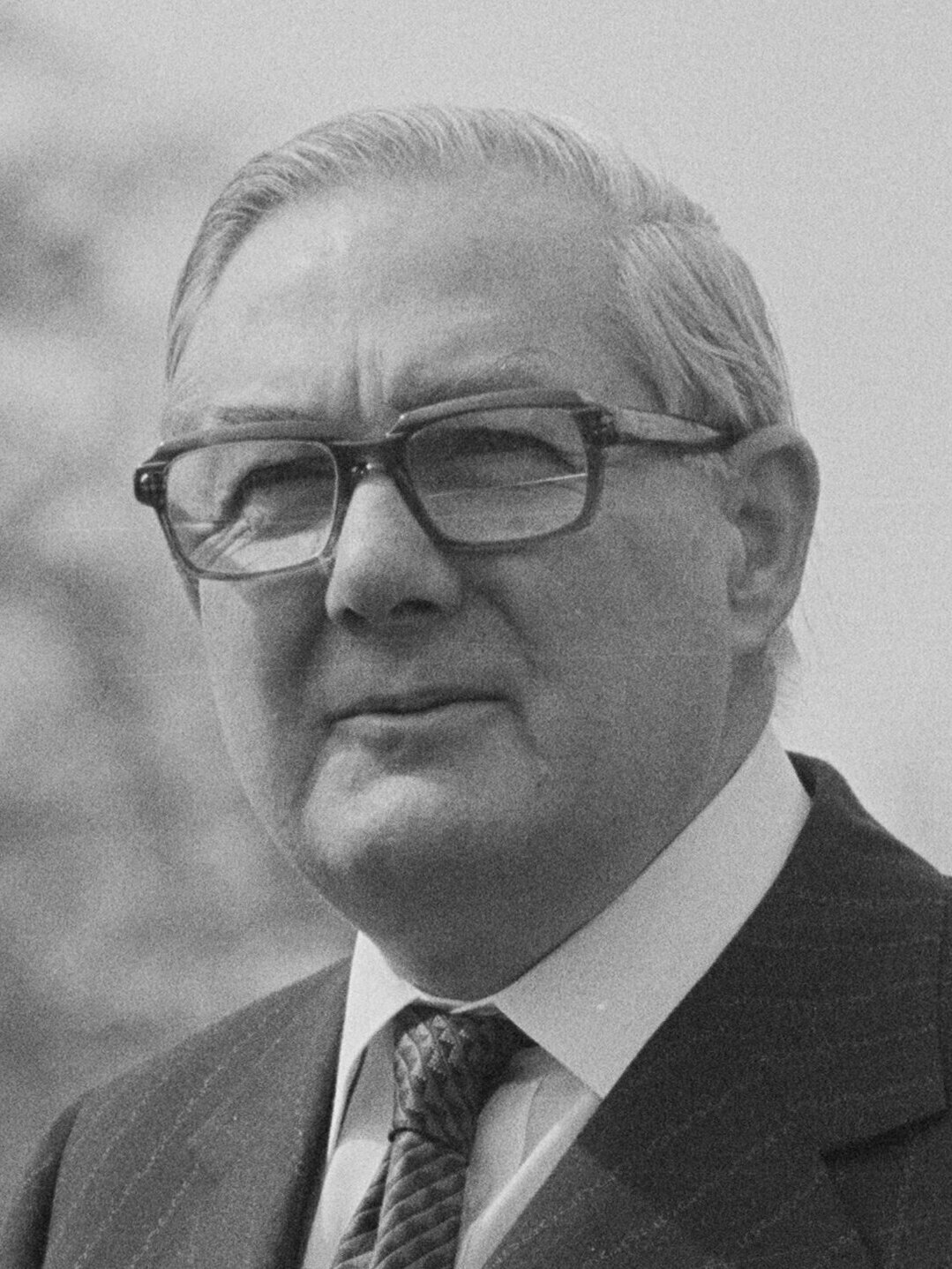

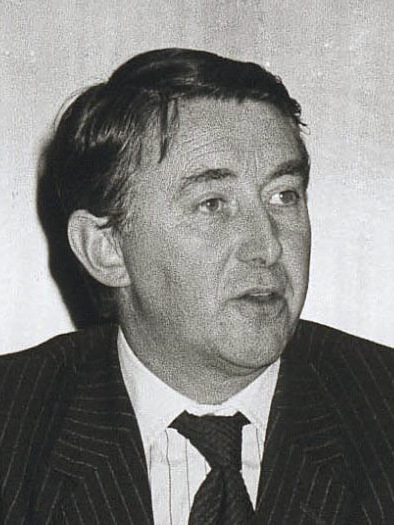
	Majority party	Minority party	Third party
Leader	Margaret Thatcher	James Callaghan	David Steel
Party	Conservative	Labour	Liberal
Leader since	11 February 1975	5 April 1976	7 July 1976
Councils +/-	▼6	▲12	▲1
Councillors	12,222	7,410	1,059
Councillors +/-	▼423	▲766	▲136

Local elections were held in the United Kingdom on 3 May 1979 (the same day as the general election). The results provided some source of comfort to the Labour Party, who recovered some lost ground from local election reversals in previous years, despite losing the general election to the Conservative Party on the same day. The Liberals also gained councillors and a council.

Labour gained 766 seats, bringing their number of councillors to 7,410.

The Conservatives lost 423 seats, leaving them with 12,222 councillors.

The Liberal Party gained 136 seats and finished with 1,059 councillors.

Changes in council control were as follows;

Labour gain from no overall control: Bassetlaw, Carlisle, Hartlepool, Newcastle-under-Lyme, South Tyneside

Labour gain from Conservative: Barrow-in-Furness, Coventry, Derby, Ipswich, Nottingham, Sandwell, Tameside, Welwyn Hatfield

Labour lose to no overall control: Thurrock

Conservative lose to no overall control: Birmingham, Cambridge, Cheltenham, Kirklees, Leeds, Pendle, Rochdale, Rugby, Warrington, Wyre Forest

Conservative gain from no overall control: Adur, Stratford-on-Avon

Conservative gain from Independent: Hart

Conservative gain from Democratic Labour: Lincoln

Liberal gain from no overall control: Medina

Independent lose to no overall control: South Lakeland, West Lindsey

== England ==
=== Metropolitan boroughs ===
==== Whole council ====
In 6 metropolitan boroughs the whole council was up for election, due to new ward boundaries, following electoral boundary reviews by the Local Government Boundary Commission for England.

Council	Previous control	Result	Details
Barnsley ‡	Labour	Labour hold	Details
Bury ‡	Conservative	Conservative hold	Details
Oldham ‡	Conservative	Conservative hold	Details
Sandwell ‡	Conservative	Labour gain	Details
Sefton ‡	Conservative	Conservative hold	Details
Solihull ‡	Conservative	Conservative hold	Details

‡ New ward boundaries

==== Third of council ====
30 metropolitan borough councils had one third of their seats up for election.

Council	Previous control	Result	Details
Birmingham	Conservative	No overall control gain	Details
Bolton	Conservative	Conservative hold	Details
Bradford	Conservative	Conservative hold	Details
Calderdale	Conservative	Conservative hold	Details
Coventry	Conservative	Labour gain	Details
Doncaster	Labour	Labour hold	Details
Dudley	Conservative	Conservative hold	Details
Gateshead	Labour	Labour hold	Details
Kirklees	Conservative	No overall control gain	Details
Knowsley	Labour	Labour hold	Details
Leeds	Conservative	No overall control gain	Details
Liverpool	No overall control	No overall control hold	Details
Manchester	Labour	Labour hold	Details
Newcastle upon Tyne	Labour	Labour hold	Details
North Tyneside	Labour	Labour hold	Details
Rochdale	Conservative	No overall control gain	Details
Rotherham	Labour	Labour hold	Details
Salford	Labour	Labour hold	Details
Sheffield	Labour	Labour hold	Details
South Tyneside	No overall control	Labour gain	Details
St Helens	Labour	Labour hold	Details
Stockport	Conservative	Conservative hold	Details
Sunderland	Labour	Labour hold	Details
Tameside	Conservative	Labour gain	Details
Trafford	Conservative	Conservative hold	Details
Wakefield	Labour	Labour hold	Details
Walsall	No overall control	No overall control hold	Details
Wigan	Labour	Labour hold	Details
Wirral	Conservative	Conservative hold	Details
Wolverhampton	No overall control	No overall control hold	Details

=== District councils ===
==== Whole council ====
In 252 districts the whole council was up for election.

In 153 districts there were new ward boundaries, following electoral boundary reviews by the Local Government Boundary Commission for England.

Council	Previous control	Result	Details
Adur ‡	No overall control	Conservative gain	Details
Allerdale ‡	No overall control	No overall control hold	Details
Alnwick ‡	Independent	No overall control gain	Details
Amber Valley ‡	No overall control	No overall control hold	Details
Arun	Conservative	Conservative hold	Details
Ashfield	Labour	Labour hold	Details
Ashford	Conservative	No overall control gain	Details
Aylesbury Vale	No overall control	Conservative gain	Details
Babergh ‡	No overall control	No overall control hold	Details
Barrow-in-Furness ‡	Conservative	Labour gain	Details
Basildon ‡	No overall control	No overall control hold	Details
Bassetlaw ‡	No overall control	Labour gain	Details
Beaconsfield	Conservative	Conservative hold	Details
Berwick-upon-Tweed	Independent	Independent hold	Details
Beverley ‡	Conservative	Conservative hold	Details
Blaby	Conservative	Conservative hold	Details
Blackburn ‡	No overall control	No overall control hold	Details
Blackpool	Conservative	Conservative hold	Details
Blyth Valley ‡	No overall control	Labour gain	Details
Bolsover ‡	Labour	Labour hold	Details
Boothferry	Independent	Conservative gain	Details
Boston ‡	No overall control	No overall control hold	Details
Bournemouth ‡	Conservative	Conservative hold	Details
Bracknell ‡	Conservative	Conservative hold	Details
Braintree ‡	Conservative	No overall control gain	Details
Breckland ‡	No overall control	Conservative gain	Details
Bridgnorth ‡	Independent	Independent hold	Details
Brighton	Conservative	Conservative hold	Details
Bristol	Labour	Labour hold	Details
Broadland ‡	Conservative	Conservative hold	Details
Bromsgrove ‡	Conservative	Conservative hold	Details
Broxtowe	Conservative	Conservative hold	Details
Canterbury ‡	Conservative	Conservative hold	Details
Caradon	Independent	Independent hold	Details
Carlisle	No overall control	Labour gain	Details
Carrick ‡	Independent	Conservative gain	Details
Castle Morpeth	No overall control	No overall control hold	Details
Castle Point ‡	Conservative	Conservative hold	Details
Charnwood	Conservative	Conservative hold	Details
Chelmsford	Conservative	Conservative hold	Details
Cheltenham	Conservative	No overall control gain	Details
Cherwell ‡	Conservative	Conservative hold	Details
Chester ‡	Conservative	Conservative hold	Details
Chesterfield ‡	Labour	Labour hold	Details
Chester-le-Street ‡	Labour	Labour hold	Details
Chichester ‡	Conservative	Conservative hold	Details
Chiltern	Conservative	Conservative hold	Details
Christchurch ‡	Conservative	Conservative hold	Details
Cleethorpes ‡	No overall control	No overall control hold	Details
Copeland ‡	No overall control	Labour gain	Details
Corby	Conservative	Labour gain	Details
Cotswold ‡	Independent	Independent hold	Details
Craven ‡	Conservative	Conservative hold	Details
Crawley ‡	Labour	Labour hold	Details
Crewe and Nantwich ‡	No overall control	No overall control hold	Details
Dacorum ‡	Conservative	Conservative hold	Details
Darlington ‡	Conservative	Labour gain	Details
Dartford	Labour	Labour hold	Details
Daventry ‡	Conservative	Conservative hold	Details
Derby ‡	Conservative	Labour gain	Details
Derwentside ‡	Labour	Labour hold	Details
Dover ‡	Conservative	Conservative hold	Details
Durham ‡	Labour	No overall control gain	Details
Easington ‡	Labour	Labour hold	Details
East Cambridgeshire	Independent	Independent hold	Details
East Devon ‡	Conservative	Conservative hold	Details
East Hampshire ‡	Conservative	Conservative hold	Details
East Hertfordshire ‡	Conservative	Conservative hold	Details
East Lindsey	Independent	Independent hold	Details
East Northamptonshire ‡	Conservative	Conservative hold	Details
East Staffordshire ‡	Conservative	No overall control gain	Details
Eden ‡	Independent	Independent hold	Details
Epping Forest ‡	Conservative	Conservative hold	Details
Epsom and Ewell	Independent	Independent hold	Details
Erewash ‡	Conservative	Conservative hold	Details
Exeter	Conservative	Conservative hold	Details
Fenland	Conservative	Conservative hold	Details
Forest Heath ‡	No overall control	Conservative gain	Details
Forest of Dean	No overall control	No overall control hold	Details
Fylde	Conservative	Conservative hold	Details
Gedling	Conservative	Conservative hold	Details
Gillingham ‡	Conservative	Conservative hold	Details
Glanford ‡	Independent	Conservative gain	Details
Gloucester ‡	Conservative	Conservative hold	Details
Gosport ‡	Conservative	Conservative hold	Details
Gravesham ‡	Conservative	Conservative hold	Details
Great Yarmouth	Conservative	Conservative hold	Details
Grimsby ‡	Conservative	Labour gain	Details
Guildford	Conservative	Conservative hold	Details
Hambleton ‡	Independent	Independent hold	Details
Harborough	Conservative	Conservative hold	Details
Hart	Independent	Conservative gain	Details
Hartlepool	No overall control	Labour gain	Details
Hastings ‡	Conservative	Conservative hold	Details
Hereford ‡	No overall control	No overall control hold	Details
High Peak ‡	Conservative	No overall control gain	Details
Hinckley and Bosworth	Conservative	Conservative hold	Details
Holderness	Independent	Independent hold	Details
Horsham ‡	Conservative	Conservative hold	Details
Hove ‡	Conservative	Conservative hold	Details
Hyndburn ‡	Conservative	Conservative hold	Details
Ipswich ‡	Conservative	Labour gain	Details
Kennet	Independent	Independent hold	Details
Kerrier ‡	Independent	No overall control gain	Details
Kettering ‡	No overall control	No overall control hold	Details
Kingston upon Hull	Labour	Labour hold	Details
Kingswood	No overall control	No overall control hold	Details
Lancaster ‡	Conservative	Conservative hold	Details
Langbaurgh	Conservative	Labour gain	Details
Leicester	Conservative	Labour gain	Details
Leominster ‡	Independent	Independent hold	Details
Lewes	Conservative	Conservative hold	Details
Lichfield ‡	Conservative	Conservative hold	Details
Lincoln ‡	Democratic Labour	Conservative gain	Details
Luton	Conservative	Conservative hold	Details
Macclesfield ‡	Conservative	Conservative hold	Details
Maidstone ‡	Conservative	Conservative hold	Details
Maldon ‡	Conservative	Conservative hold	Details
Malvern Hills ‡	Independent	Independent hold	Details
Mansfield ‡	Labour	Labour hold	Details
Medina ‡	No overall control	Liberal gain	Details
Medway ‡	Conservative	Conservative hold	Details
Melton ‡	Conservative	Conservative hold	Details
Mendip ‡	No overall control	Independent gain	Details
Mid Bedfordshire ‡	Conservative	Conservative hold	Details
Mid Devon ‡	Independent	Independent hold	Details
Mid Suffolk ‡	No overall control	No overall control hold	Details
Mid Sussex	No overall control	Conservative gain	Details
Middlesbrough ‡	Labour	Labour hold	Details
New Forest	Conservative	Conservative hold	Details
Newark and Sherwood ‡	Conservative	No overall control gain	Details
Newbury	Conservative	Conservative hold	Details
Newcastle-under-Lyme ‡	No overall control	Labour gain	Details
North Bedfordshire	Conservative	Conservative hold	Details
North Cornwall ‡	Independent	Independent hold	Details
North Devon	Independent	Independent hold	Details
North Dorset	Independent	Independent hold	Details
North East Derbyshire ‡	No overall control	Labour gain	Details
North Hertfordshire ‡	Conservative	Conservative hold	Details
North Kesteven ‡	Independent	Independent hold	Details
North Norfolk ‡	Independent	Independent hold	Details
North Shropshire	Independent	Independent hold	Details
North Warwickshire ‡	No overall control	Labour gain	Details
North West Leicestershire	No overall control	Labour gain	Details
North Wiltshire	Conservative	Conservative hold	Details
North Wolds	Independent	Conservative gain	Details
Northampton ‡	Conservative	Conservative hold	Details
Northavon	Conservative	Conservative hold	Details
Norwich ‡	Labour	Labour hold	Details
Nottingham	Conservative	Labour gain	Details
Nuneaton ‡	Labour	Labour hold	Details
Oadby and Wigston ‡	Conservative	Conservative hold	Details
Oswestry	Independent	Independent hold	Details
Oxford ‡	Conservative	Conservative hold	Details
Penwith ‡	Independent	Independent hold	Details
Plymouth ‡	Conservative	Conservative hold	Details
Poole	Conservative	Conservative hold	Details
Portsmouth	Conservative	Conservative hold	Details
Purbeck ‡	Independent	Independent hold	Details
Reading	No overall control	No overall control hold	Details
Redditch	Conservative	Conservative hold	Details
Reigate and Banstead ‡	Conservative	Conservative hold	Details
Restormel	Independent	Independent hold	Details
Ribble Valley	Conservative	Conservative hold	Details
Richmondshire ‡	Independent	Independent hold	Details
Rother	Independent	No overall control gain	Details
Rugby ‡	Conservative	No overall control gain	Details
Rushcliffe	Conservative	Conservative hold	Details
Rushmoor ‡	Conservative	Conservative hold	Details
Rutland ‡	Independent	Independent hold	Details
Ryedale	Independent	Independent hold	Details
Salisbury	No overall control	No overall control hold	Details
Scarborough ‡	Conservative	Conservative hold	Details
Scunthorpe ‡	Labour	Labour hold	Details
Sedgefield	Labour	Labour hold	Details
Sedgemoor ‡	Conservative	Conservative hold	Details
Selby ‡	No overall control	Conservative gain	Details
Sevenoaks ‡	Conservative	Conservative hold	Details
Shepway ‡	Conservative	Conservative hold	Details
Slough	Conservative	Conservative hold	Details
South Derbyshire ‡	No overall control	No overall control hold	Details
South Hams ‡	Independent	Independent hold	Details
South Herefordshire ‡	Independent	Independent hold	Details
South Holland ‡	Independent	Independent hold	Details
South Kesteven ‡	No overall control	Conservative gain	Details
South Lakeland ‡	Independent	No overall control gain	Details
South Norfolk ‡	No overall control	Conservative gain	Details
South Northamptonshire	No overall control	Conservative gain	Details
South Oxfordshire	Conservative	Conservative hold	Details
South Ribble	Conservative	Conservative hold	Details
South Shropshire	Independent	Independent hold	Details
South Staffordshire ‡	Conservative	Conservative hold	Details
South Wight ‡	Independent	Independent hold	Details
Southampton ‡	Conservative	Conservative hold	Details
Spelthorne ‡	Conservative	Conservative hold	Details
St Albans ‡	Conservative	Conservative hold	Details
St Edmundsbury ‡	Conservative	Conservative hold	Details
Stafford ‡	No overall control	No overall control hold	Details
Staffordshire Moorlands	No overall control	No overall control hold	Details
Stevenage ‡	Labour	Labour hold	Details
Stockton-on-Tees ‡	Conservative	Labour gain	Details
Stoke-on-Trent ‡	Labour	Labour hold	Details
Stratford-on-Avon ‡	No overall control	Conservative gain	Details
Stroud	Conservative	Conservative hold	Details
Suffolk Coastal	Conservative	Conservative hold	Details
Surrey Heath	Conservative	Conservative hold	Details
Swale ‡	Conservative	Conservative hold	Details
Taunton Deane ‡	Conservative	Conservative hold	Details
Teesdale	Independent	Independent hold	Details
Teignbridge ‡	Independent	Independent hold	Details
Tendring	Conservative	Conservative hold	Details
Test Valley	No overall control	Conservative gain	Details
Tewkesbury	Independent	Independent hold	Details
Thanet ‡	Conservative	Conservative hold	Details
The Wrekin ‡	Labour	Labour hold	Details
Thurrock ‡	Labour	No overall control gain	Details
Tonbridge and Malling ‡	Conservative	Conservative hold	Details
Torbay	Conservative	Conservative hold	Details
Torridge ‡	Independent	Independent hold	Details
Tynedale	Independent	No overall control gain	Details
Uttlesford	Conservative	Conservative hold	Details
Vale of White Horse ‡	Conservative	Conservative hold	Details
Vale Royal	No overall control	No overall control hold	Details
Wansbeck	Labour	Labour hold	Details
Wansdyke	Conservative	Conservative hold	Details
Warrington ‡	Conservative	No overall control gain	Details
Warwick	Conservative	Conservative hold	Details
Waveney	Conservative	Conservative hold	Details
Waverley	Conservative	Conservative hold	Details
Wealden	Conservative	Conservative hold	Details
Wear Valley	No overall control	Labour gain	Details
Wellingborough	Conservative	Conservative hold	Details
West Derbyshire ‡	Conservative	Conservative hold	Details
West Devon ‡	Independent	Independent hold	Details
West Dorset	Independent	Independent hold	Details
West Lindsey ‡	Independent	No overall control gain	Details
West Norfolk	Conservative	Conservative hold	Details
West Oxfordshire ‡	No overall control	No overall control hold	Details
West Somerset ‡	Independent	Independent hold	Details
West Wiltshire	No overall control	Conservative gain	Details
Weymouth and Portland ‡	Conservative	Conservative hold	Details
Wimborne	Conservative	Conservative hold	Details
Windsor and Maidenhead	Conservative	Conservative hold	Details
Wokingham ‡	Conservative	Conservative hold	Details
Woodspring ‡	Conservative	Conservative hold	Details
Worcester ‡	Conservative	Conservative hold	Details
Worthing	Conservative	Conservative hold	Details
Wychavon ‡	Independent	Independent hold	Details
Wycombe	Conservative	Conservative hold	Details
Wyre ‡	Conservative	Conservative hold	Details
Wyre Forest ‡	Conservative	No overall control gain	Details
Yeovil	Conservative	No overall control gain	Details
York ‡	Conservative	Conservative hold	Details

‡ New ward boundaries

==== Third of council ====
In 44 districts one third of the council was up for election.

Council	Previous control	Result	Details
Basingstoke and Deane	Conservative	Conservative hold	Details
Bath	Conservative	Conservative hold	Details
Brentwood	Conservative	Conservative hold	Details
Broxbourne	Conservative	Conservative hold	Details
Burnley	Labour	Labour hold	Details
Cambridge	Conservative	No overall control gain	Details
Cannock Chase	Labour	Labour hold	Details
Chorley	Conservative	Conservative hold	Details
Colchester	Conservative	Conservative hold	Details
Congleton	Conservative	Conservative hold	Details
Eastbourne	Conservative	Conservative hold	Details
Eastleigh	Conservative	Conservative hold	Details
Ellesmere Port and Neston	Labour	Labour hold	Details
Elmbridge	Conservative	Conservative hold	Details
Fareham	Conservative	Conservative hold	Details
Halton	Labour	Labour hold	Details
Harlow	Labour	Labour hold	Details
Harrogate	Conservative	Conservative hold	Details
Havant	Conservative	Conservative hold	Details
Hertsmere	Conservative	Conservative hold	Details
Huntingdon	Conservative	Conservative hold	Details
Milton Keynes	Conservative	Conservative hold	Details
Mole Valley	No overall control	No overall control hold	Details
Pendle	Conservative	No overall control gain	Details
Peterborough	No overall control	No overall control hold	Details
Preston	Conservative	Conservative hold	Details
Rochford	Conservative	Conservative hold	Details
Rossendale	Conservative	Conservative hold	Details
Runnymede	Conservative	Conservative hold	Details
Shrewsbury and Atcham	Conservative	Conservative hold	Details
South Bedfordshire	Conservative	Conservative hold	Details
South Cambridgeshire	Independent	Independent hold	Details
Southend-on-Sea	Conservative	Conservative hold	Details
Tamworth	Conservative	Conservative hold	Details
Tandridge	Conservative	Conservative hold	Details
Thamesdown	Labour	Labour hold	Details
Three Rivers	Conservative	Conservative hold	Details
Tunbridge Wells	Conservative	Conservative hold	Details
Watford	Labour	Labour hold	Details
Welwyn Hatfield	Conservative	Labour gain	Details
West Lancashire	Conservative	Conservative hold	Details
Winchester	No overall control	Conservative gain	Details
Woking	Conservative	Conservative hold	Details

== Wales ==
=== District councils ===
Council	Previous control	Result	Details
Aberconwy	Independent	Independent hold	Details
Afan	Independent	Labour gain	Details
Alyn and Deeside	No overall control	No overall control hold	Details
Anglesey - Ynys Môn	Independent	Independent hold	Details
Arfon	Independent	No overall control gain	Details
Blaenau Gwent	Labour	Labour hold	Details
Brecknock	Independent	Independent hold	Details
Cardiff	Conservative	Labour gain	Details
Carmarthen	Independent	Independent hold	Details
Ceredigion	Independent	Independent hold	Details
Colwyn	No overall control	No overall control hold	Details
Cynon Valley	Labour	Labour hold	Details
Delyn	Independent	No overall control gain	Details
Dinefwr	Independent	Independent hold	Details
Dwyfor	Independent	Independent hold	Details
Glyndŵr	Independent	Independent hold	Details
Islwyn	No overall control	Labour gain	Details
Llanelli	Labour	Labour hold	Details
Lliw Valley	Labour	Labour hold	Details
Meirionnydd	Independent	Independent hold	Details
Merthyr Tydfil	Plaid Cymru	Labour gain	Details
Monmouth	Conservative	Conservative hold	Details
Montgomery	Independent	Independent hold	Details
Neath	Labour	Labour hold	Details
Newport	Conservative	Labour gain	Details
Ogwr	No overall control	No overall control hold	Details
Preseli	Independent	Independent hold	Details
Radnor	Independent	Independent hold	Details
Rhondda	Labour	Labour hold	Details
Rhuddlan	Independent	Independent hold	Details
Rhymney Valley	No overall control	Labour gain	Details
South Pembrokeshire	Independent	Independent hold	Details
Swansea	Independent	Labour gain	Details
Taff-Ely	No overall control	Labour gain	Details
Torfaen	Labour	Labour hold	Details
Vale of Glamorgan	Conservative	Conservative hold	Details
Wrexham Maelor	No overall control	No overall control hold	Details
