= 1979 Hertsmere Borough Council election =

Local election in England

- 3 May 1979

13 out of 39 seats to Hertsmere Borough Council 20 seats needed for a majority
- Registered: 43,030
- Turnout: 76.8% (▲29.2%)

	First party	Second party	Third party
Party	Conservative	Labour	Liberal
Seats won	5	7	1
Seats after	24	11	4
Seat change	▼1	▲1	Steady
Popular vote	15,898	12,166	4,997
Percentage	48.1%	36.8%	15.1%
Swing	▼9.3%	▲16.1%	▼6.1%
- Winner of each seat at the 1979 Hertsmere Borough Council election. Wards in white were not contested.
Control before election
Conservative
Control after election
Conservative

The 1979 Hertsmere Borough Council election took place on 3 May 1979 to elect members of Hertsmere Borough Council in Hertfordshire, England. This was on the same day as the 1979 general election and other local elections.

== Summary ==
=== Election result ===
1979 Hertsmere Borough Council election
Party	This election				Full council			This election		
Party	Candidates	Seats	Net	Seats %	Other	Total	Total %	Votes	Votes %	+/−
Conservative	{{{candidates}}}	5	▼1	38.5	19	24	61.5	15,898	48.1	–9.3
Labour	{{{candidates}}}	7	▲1	53.8	4	11	28.2	12,166	36.8	+16.1
Liberal	{{{candidates}}}	1	Steady	7.7	3	4	10.3	4,997	15.1	–6.1

== Ward results ==
Incumbent councillors standing for re-election are marked with an asterisk (*). Changes in seats do not take into account by-elections or defections.

=== Aldenham East ===
Aldenham East
Party	Candidate	Votes	%	±%
Conservative	Jordan*	2,101	78.0	–8.7
Liberal	Mallack	371	13.8	+7.8
Labour	Holland	221	8.2	+0.9
Majority		1,730	64.2	–15.2
Turnout		2,693	78.7	+28.4
Registered electors		3,423		
Conservative hold		Swing	▼8.3	

=== Aldenham West ===
Aldenham West
Party	Candidate	Votes	%	±%
Conservative	G. Nunn	1,726	63.5	–13.2
Labour	Stapley	528	19.4	–3.9
Liberal	Chadwick	465	17.1	N/A
Majority		1,198	44.1	N/A
Turnout		2,719	75.5	+28.1
Registered electors		3,602		
Conservative hold		Swing	▼4.7	

=== Brookmeadow ===
Brookmeadow
Party	Candidate	Votes	%	±%
Labour	D. Button*	1,727	72.9	–7.5
Conservative	Bouma	643	27.1	+7.5
Majority		1,084	45.8	–15.0
Turnout		2,370	75.4	+29.1
Registered electors		3,143		
Labour hold		Swing	▼7.5	

=== Campions ===
Campions
Party	Candidate	Votes	%	±%
Labour	J. Nolan*	896	69.7	–12.8
Conservative	Lockwood	389	30.3	+12.8
Majority		507	39.4	–25.6
Turnout		1,285	70.1	+15.8
Registered electors		1,834		
Labour hold		Swing	▼12.8	

=== Cowley ===
Cowley
Party	Candidate	Votes	%	±%
Labour	A. Rosier*	1,700	64.1	–4.0
Conservative	Watts	953	35.9	+4.0
Majority		747	28.2	–8.0
Turnout		2,653	72.3	+40.5
Registered electors		3,670		
Labour hold		Swing	▼4.0	

=== Elstree ===
Elstree
Party	Candidate	Votes	%	±%
Conservative	Thomas*	2,017	65.1	–7.3
Labour	Bara	653	21.1	–1.3
Liberal	Crombie	429	13.8	+8.5
Majority		1,364	44.0	–6.0
Turnout		3,099	79.6	+29.1
Registered electors		3,891		
Conservative hold		Swing	▼3.0	

=== Hillside ===
Hillside
Party	Candidate	Votes	%	±%
Labour	P. Rose	1,211	48.7	–4.1
Conservative	H. Stevens	934	37.6	–2.5
Liberal	Mackay	342	13.8	+6.7
Majority		277	11.1	N/A
Turnout		2,487	76.3	+34.5
Registered electors		3,259		
Labour hold		Swing	▼0.8	

=== Kenilworth ===
Kenilworth
Party	Candidate	Votes	%	±%
Labour	Hoare	1,244	50.2	–8.6
Conservative	Upton	929	37.5	+1.1
Liberal	Saunders	306	12.3	+7.5
Majority		315	12.7	–9.7
Turnout		2,479	75.3	+26.0
Registered electors		3,293		
Labour hold		Swing	▼4.9	

=== Lyndhurst ===
Lyndhurst
Party	Candidate	Votes	%	±%
Labour	Coe	1,305	50.02	+1.4
Conservative	Hinc*	1,304	49.98	–1.4
Majority		1	0.04	N/A
Turnout		2,609	78.9	+29.4
Registered electors		3,306		
Labour gain from Conservative		Swing	▲1.4	

=== Mill ===
Mill
Party	Candidate	Votes	%	±%
Liberal	M. Colne*	1,963	70.8	+14.3
Conservative	Kirby	517	18.6	–10.7
Labour	Squires	294	10.6	–3.6
Majority		1,446	52.2	+25.0
Turnout		2,774	80.8	+31.1
Registered electors		3,434		
Liberal hold		Swing	▲12.5	

=== Potters Bar East ===
Potters Bar East
Party	Candidate	Votes	%	±%
Conservative	B. Watson	2,244	59.1	–4.9
Labour	Ford	1,017	26.8	+4.0
Liberal	Byworth	537	14.1	+5.2
Majority		1,227	32.3	–8.9
Turnout		3,798	78.1	+29.0
Registered electors		4,861		
Conservative hold		Swing	▼4.5	

=== Potters Bar West ===
Potters Bar West
Party	Candidate	Votes	%	±%
Conservative	E. Muddle*	1,563	55.9	–0.8
Labour	J. McCarthy	650	23.2	+7.6
Liberal	Shannon	584	20.9	–6.8
Majority		913	32.7	N/A
Turnout		2,797	77.8	+23.3
Registered electors		3,595		
Conservative hold		Swing	▼4.2	

=== Shenley ===
Shenley
Party	Candidate	Votes	%	±%
Labour	E. Broadley*	720	55.5	+0.9
Conservative	Wild	578	44.5	–0.9
Majority		142	11.0	+1.8
Turnout		1,298	75.5	+14.6
Registered electors		1,719		
Labour hold		Swing	▲0.9	
