= 1979 Maldon District Council election =

1979 English local government election

- 3 May 1979

All 30 seats to Maldon District Council 16 seats needed for a majority
- Registered: 34,161
- Turnout: ~52.4%

	First party	Second party	Third party
Party	Conservative	Independent	Liberal
Seats won	18	6	3
Seat change	▼2	▼1	▲3
Popular vote	15,886	4,708	3,945
Percentage	49.5%	14.7%	12.3%
Swing	▼3.0%	▲0.7%	▲2.1%
	Fourth party	Fifth party	Sixth party
Party	Labour	Ind. Conservative	Independent Labour
Seats won	2	1	0
Seat change	▲1	Steady	▼1
Popular vote	5,275	2,311	did not stand
Percentage	16.4%	7.2%	did not stand
Swing	▼2.6%	▲6.2%	▼3.3%
- Winner of each seat at the 1979 Maldon District Council election.
Control before election
Conservative
Control after election
Conservative

The 1979 Maldon District Council election took place on 3 May 1979 to elect members of Maldon District Council in Essex, England. This was on the same day as other local elections.

== Summary ==
=== Election result ===
1979 Maldon District Council election
Party	Candidates	Seats	Gains	Losses	Net gain/loss	Seats %	Votes %	Votes	+/−
Conservative	24	18	N/A	N/A	▼2	60.0	49.5	15,886	–3.0
Independent	9	6	N/A	N/A	▼1	20.0	14.7	4,708	+0.7
Liberal	5	3	N/A	N/A	▲3	10.0	12.3	3,945	+2.1
Labour	10	2	N/A	N/A	▲1	6.7	16.4	5,275	–2.6
Ind. Conservative	3	1	N/A	N/A	Steady	3.3	7.2	2,311	+6.2
Independent Labour	0	0	N/A	N/A	▼1	0.0	N/A	N/A	–3.3

== Ward results ==
Incumbent councillors standing for re-election are marked with an asterisk (*). Changes in seats do not take into account by-elections or defections.

=== Althorne ===
Althorne
Party	Candidate	Votes	%
Conservative	D. Heritage*	Unopposed	
Registered electors		1,371	
Conservative win (new seat)			

=== Burnham-on-Crouch North ===
Burnham-on-Crouch North
Party	Candidate	Votes	%
Conservative	L. Martin	775	56.3
Ind. Conservative	K. Sarling	601	43.7
Majority		174	12.6
Turnout		1,376	77.3
Registered electors		1,873	
Conservative win (new seat)			

=== Burnham-on-Crouch South ===
Burnham-on-Crouch South (3 seats)
Party	Candidate	Votes	%
Independent	S. Hull*	1,407	61.4
Conservative	J. Horsfall	1,150	50.2
Conservative	M. Freeman*	1,148	50.1
Ind. Conservative	M. Wood	947	41.3
Turnout		~2,293	76.1
Registered electors		3,013	
Independent win (new seat)			
Conservative win (new seat)			
Conservative win (new seat)			

=== Cold Norton ===
Cold Norton
Party	Candidate	Votes	%	±%
Conservative	A. Eley	Unopposed		
Registered electors		1,086		
Conservative hold				

=== Goldhanger ===
Goldhanger
Party	Candidate	Votes	%	±%
Conservative	H. Frost*	Unopposed		
Registered electors		1,094		
Conservative hold				

=== Great Totham ===
Great Totham (2 seats)
Party	Candidate	Votes	%	±%
Conservative	F. Anderson*	1,137	64.3	
Conservative	R. Bass*	1,131	64.0	
Independent	T. Lazell	676	38.2	
Turnout		~1,768	82.1	
Registered electors		2,153		
Conservative hold				
Conservative hold				

=== Heybridge East ===
Heybridge East
Party	Candidate	Votes	%
Liberal	L. Bermingham	613	57.2
Conservative	R. Thomas	344	32.1
Labour	M. Barrett	114	10.6
Majority		269	25.1
Turnout		1,071	79.9
Registered electors		1,361	
Liberal win (new seat)			

=== Heybridge West ===
Heybridge West (2 seats)
Party	Candidate	Votes	%
Liberal	D. Scott	1,088	75.2
Liberal	A. Good	977	67.5
Conservative	R. Newell	230	15.9
Conservative	B. Allway	184	12.7
Labour	G. Batt	134	9.3
Labour	A. Joyce	130	9.0
Turnout		~1,447	76.3
Registered electors		1,896	
Liberal win (new seat)			
Liberal win (new seat)			

=== Maldon East ===
Maldon East (2 seats)
Party	Candidate	Votes	%
Labour	G. Hughes*	888	61.4
Labour	E. Bannister	832	57.5
Conservative	J. Murphy	472	32.6
Conservative	B. Salmon	472	32.6
Turnout		~1,447	70.6
Registered electors		2,050	
Labour win (new seat)			
Labour win (new seat)			

=== Maldon North West ===
Maldon North West (3 seats)
Party	Candidate	Votes	%
Conservative	R. Pipe*	1,332	55.6
Conservative	R. Daws*	1,236	51.6
Conservative	K. Munnion*	1,051	43.9
Labour	D. Cargill	779	32.5
Labour	J. Lewis	663	27.7
Labour	P. Locke	630	26.3
Liberal	D. Coulthread	547	22.8
Turnout		~2,394	76.5
Registered electors		3,129	
Conservative win (new seat)			
Conservative win (new seat)			
Conservative win (new seat)			

=== Maldon South ===
Maldon South (2 seats)
Party	Candidate	Votes	%
Conservative	D. Sewell*	945	45.6
Conservative	C. Dowsett*	880	42.5
Liberal	G. Billingham	720	34.7
Labour	C. Tait	605	29.2
Labour	W. Godfrey	500	24.1
Turnout		~2,072	82.4
Registered electors		2,515	
Conservative win (new seat)			
Conservative win (new seat)			

=== Purleigh ===
Purleigh
Party	Candidate	Votes	%	±%
Independent	G. Barber*	Unopposed		
Registered electors		1,129		
Independent hold				

=== Southminster ===
Southminster (2 seats)
Party	Candidate	Votes	%	±%
Conservative	J. Cottam*	932	57.2	
Ind. Conservative	D. Fisher*	763	46.8	
Independent	M. Black	749	46.0	
Turnout		~1,629	75.2	
Registered electors		2,166		
Conservative hold				
Ind. Conservative hold				

=== St. Lawrence ===
St. Lawrence
Party	Candidate	Votes	%	±%
Independent	R. Cowell	Unopposed		
Registered electors		797		
Independent hold				

=== The Maylands ===
The Maylands
Party	Candidate	Votes	%
Conservative	P. Bullard	Unopposed	
Registered electors		1,548	
Conservative hold			

=== Tillingham & Bradwell ===
Tillingham & Bradwell
Party	Candidate	Votes	%	±%
Independent	K. Bruce	556	57.7	
Independent	E. Chandler	407	42.3	
Majority		149	15.4	
Turnout		963	78.0	
Registered electors		1,252		
Independent hold		Swing		

=== Tollesbury ===
Tollesbury (2 seats)
Party	Candidate	Votes	%	±%
Independent	D. Shrimpton	913	63.0	
Conservative	R. Anscomb	730	50.3	
Conservative	E. Stephens	605	41.7	
Turnout		~1,450	82.4	
Registered electors		1,760		
Independent gain from Conservative				
Conservative hold				

=== Tolleshunt D'Arcy ===
Tolleshunt D'Arcy
Party	Candidate	Votes	%	±%
Conservative	E. Peel*	Unopposed		
Registered electors		1,355		
Conservative hold				

=== Wickham Bishops ===
Wickham Bishops
Party	Candidate	Votes	%	±%
Conservative	H. Bass*	Unopposed		
Registered electors		1,431		
Conservative hold				

=== Woodham ===
Woodham
Party	Candidate	Votes	%	±%
Independent	P. Herrmann*	Unopposed		
Registered electors		1,182		
Independent hold				
