= 1979 Mid Suffolk District Council election =

UK local election

- 3 May 1979

All 40 seats to Mid Suffolk District Council 21 seats needed for a majority

	First party	Second party
Party	Independent	Conservative
Seats won	18	15
Seat change	▼1	▲2
Popular vote	5,632	11,572
Percentage	19.3%	39.7%
Swing	▼10.1%	▲19.0%
	Third party	Fourth party
Party	Labour	Liberal
Seats won	5	2
Seat change	▼1	Steady
Popular vote	9,112	2,837
Percentage	31.3%	9.7%
Swing	▼3.4%	▼5.5%
- Winner of each seat at the 1979 Mid Suffolk District Council election.
Council control before election
No overall control
Council control after election
No overall control

The 1979 Mid Suffolk District Council election took place on 3 May 1979 to elect members of Mid Suffolk District Council in Suffolk, England. This was on the same day as the 1979 general election and other local elections.

== Summary ==
=== Election result ===
1979 Mid Suffolk District Council election
Party	Candidates	Seats	Gains	Losses	Net gain/loss	Seats %	Votes %	Votes	+/−
Independent	19	18	N/A	N/A	▼1	45.0	19.3	5,632	–10.1
Conservative	23	15	N/A	N/A	▲2	37.5	39.7	11,572	+19.0
Labour	15	5	N/A	N/A	▼1	12.5	31.3	9,112	–3.4
Liberal	3	2	N/A	N/A	Steady	5.0	9.7	2,837	–5.5

== Ward results ==
Incumbent councillors standing for re-election are marked with an asterisk (*). Changes in seats do not take into account by-elections or defections.

=== Badwell Ash ===
Badwell Ash
Party	Candidate	Votes	%	±%
Independent	H. Linn*	Unopposed		
Registered electors		1,115		
Independent hold				

=== Barham ===
Barham
Party	Candidate	Votes	%	±%
Independent	J. Macrow*	Unopposed		
Registered electors		1,297		
Independent gain from Conservative				

=== Barking ===
Barking
Party	Candidate	Votes	%	±%
Independent	P. Chapman*	Unopposed		
Registered electors		1,413		
Independent hold				

=== Bramford ===
Bramford (2 seats)
Party	Candidate	Votes	%	±%
Independent	G. Cunningham*	1,207	52.3	
Conservative	C. Bird	1,099	47.7	
Conservative	S. Dickson	941	40.8	
Turnout		~2,306	78.4	
Registered electors		2,941		
Independent gain from Labour				
Conservative win (new seat)				

=== Claydon ===
Claydon
Party	Candidate	Votes	%	±%
Conservative	H. Griffiths*	Unopposed		
Registered electors		1,109		
Conservative gain from Independent				

=== Creeting ===
Creeting
Party	Candidate	Votes	%	±%
Independent	J. Ward*	693	84.3	
Labour	A. Winchester	129	15.7	
Majority		564	68.6	
Turnout		822	77.7	
Registered electors		1,058		
Independent hold		Swing		

=== Debenham ===
Debenham
Party	Candidate	Votes	%	±%
Conservative	R. Glass*	Unopposed		
Registered electors		1,345		
Conservative hold				

=== Elmswell ===
Elmswell
Party	Candidate	Votes	%	±%
Independent	D. Dyball*	Unopposed		
Registered electors		1,435		
Independent hold				

=== Eye ===
Eye
Party	Candidate	Votes	%	±%
Independent	C. Flatman*	Unopposed		
Registered electors		1,399		
Independent hold				

=== Fressingfield ===
Fressingfield
Party	Candidate	Votes	%	±%
Conservative	E. Rice*	582	62.0	
Liberal	R. White	357	38.0	
Majority		225	24.0	
Turnout		939	80.0	
Registered electors		1,174		
Conservative hold		Swing		

=== Gislingham ===
Gislingham
Party	Candidate	Votes	%	±%
Independent	W. Stevens	634	66.2	
Conservative	V. Beak	323	33.8	
Majority		311	32.4	
Turnout		957	74.7	
Registered electors		1,281		
Independent hold		Swing		

=== Haughley & Wetherden ===
Haughley & Wetherden
Party	Candidate	Votes	%	±%
Labour	E. Crascall*	Unopposed		
Registered electors		1,344		
Labour hold				

=== Helmingham ===
Helmingham
Party	Candidate	Votes	%	±%
Independent	R. Willsher*	Unopposed		
Registered electors		1,063		
Independent hold				

=== Hoxne ===
Hoxne
Party	Candidate	Votes	%	±%
Conservative	G. McGregor*	Unopposed		
Registered electors		1,231		
Conservative hold				

=== Mendlesham ===
Mendlesham
Party	Candidate	Votes	%	±%
Independent	A. Braybrooke*	Unopposed		
Registered electors		1,360		
Independent hold				

=== Needham Market ===
Needham Market (2 seats)
Party	Candidate	Votes	%	±%
Conservative	J. Swain*	1,028	61.6	
Conservative	E. Lacey	917	55.0	
Labour	P. Koppel	641	38.4	
Labour	P. Carter	559	33.5	
Turnout		~1,669	81.2	
Registered electors		2,055		
Conservative hold				
Conservative win (new seat)				

=== Norton ===
Norton
Party	Candidate	Votes	%	±%
Conservative	B. Siffleet*	601	53.6	
Independent	F. Armstrong	520	46.4	
Majority		81	7.2	
Turnout		1,121	76.2	
Registered electors		1,471		
Conservative hold		Swing		

=== Onehouse ===
Onehouse
Party	Candidate	Votes	%	±%
Independent	H. Mitson*	Unopposed		
Registered electors		1,371		
Independent hold				

=== Palgrave ===
Palgrave
Party	Candidate	Votes	%	±%
Independent	W. Wickett*	477	50.7	
Conservative	N. Goodin	464	49.3	
Majority		13	1.4	
Turnout		941	74.9	
Registered electors		1,256		
Independent hold		Swing		

=== Rattlesden ===
Rattlesden
Party	Candidate	Votes	%	±%
Conservative	L. Muir*	Unopposed		
Registered electors		1,296		
Conservative hold				

=== Rickinghall ===
Rickinghall
Party	Candidate	Votes	%	±%
Independent	R. Moss*	Unopposed		
Registered electors		1,446		
Independent hold				

=== Ringshall ===
Ringshall
Party	Candidate	Votes	%	±%
Independent	H. Crooks*	729	79.4	
Labour	V. Boyle	189	20.6	
Majority		540	58.8	
Turnout		918	75.9	
Registered electors		1,209		
Independent hold		Swing		

=== Stonham ===
Stonham
Party	Candidate	Votes	%	±%
Conservative	H. D'Arcy*	Unopposed		
Registered electors		1,103		
Conservative hold				

=== Stowmarket Central ===
Stowmarket Central (2 seats)
Party	Candidate	Votes	%
Liberal	F. Brooke	1,164	37.0
Conservative	J. Cade	1,046	33.3
Conservative	D. Perry	982	31.3
Labour	P. Oldfield	935	29.8
Labour	E. Jones	861	27.4
Turnout		~3,144	79.9
Registered electors		3,936	
Liberal win (new seat)			
Conservative win (new seat)			

=== Stowmarket North ===
Stowmarket North (2 seats)
Party	Candidate	Votes	%
Labour	R. Jones*	939	42.4
Independent	R. Pattle*	764	34.5
Labour	H. Franklin	554	25.0
Conservative	J. Burch	511	23.1
Turnout		~2,218	74.6
Registered electors		2,968	
Labour win (new seat)			
Independent win (new seat)			

=== Stowmarket South ===
Stowmarket South (2 seats)
Party	Candidate	Votes	%
Labour	E. Nunn	909	54.5
Labour	C. Soames	861	51.6
Conservative	P. Fox	758	45.5
Turnout		~1,670	81.0
Registered electors		2,058	
Labour win (new seat)			
Labour win (new seat)			

=== Stowupland ===
Stowupland (2 seats)
Party	Candidate	Votes	%	±%
Liberal	S. Wilson*	1,316	42.0	
Labour	A. Addison*	1,075	34.3	
Labour	M. Shave	904	28.9	
Conservative	D. Knight	741	23.7	
Turnout		~3,128	84.2	
Registered electors		3,720		
Liberal hold				
Labour hold				

=== Stradbroke ===
Stradbroke
Party	Candidate	Votes	%	±%
Independent	S. Hawes*	Unopposed		
Registered electors		1,152		
Independent hold				

=== Thurston ===
Thurston
Party	Candidate	Votes	%	±%
Conservative	S. Davies	Unopposed		
Registered electors		1,366		
Conservative hold				

=== Walsham-le-Willows ===
Walsham-le-Willows
Party	Candidate	Votes	%	±%
Conservative	S. Edwards*	Unopposed		
Registered electors		1,341		
Conservative hold				

=== Wetheringsett ===
Wetheringsett
Party	Candidate	Votes	%	±%
Independent	G. Taylor*	Unopposed		
Registered electors		1,191		
Independent hold				

=== Weybread ===
Weybread
Party	Candidate	Votes	%	±%
Conservative	G. Thompson*	663	69.3	
Labour	S. Peck	294	30.7	
Majority		369	38.6	
Turnout		957	83.4	
Registered electors		1,147		
Conservative hold		Swing		

=== Woolpit ===
Woolpit
Party	Candidate	Votes	%	±%
Independent	R. Baker	608	69.7	
Conservative	P. Maitland*	264	30.3	
Majority		344	39.4	
Turnout		872	85.4	
Registered electors		1,021		
Independent gain from Conservative		Swing		

=== Worlingworth ===
Worlingworth
Party	Candidate	Votes	%	±%
Conservative	K. Thurman	652	71.3	
Labour	R. Bushby	262	28.7	
Majority		390	42.6	
Turnout		914	79.6	
Registered electors		1,148		
Conservative gain from Independent		Swing		
