= 1979 North Bedfordshire Borough Council election =

North Bedfordshire Borough Council election

The 1979 North Bedfordshire Borough Council election took place on 3 May 1979 to elect members of North Bedfordshire Borough Council in England. This was on the same day as the 1979 general election and other local elections.

== Summary ==
=== Election result ===
1979 North Bedfordshire Borough Council election
Party	Seats	Gains	Losses	Net gain/loss	Seats %	Votes %	Votes	+/−
Conservative	36			▲2	64.3	41.2	94,049	–6.9
Labour	10			▲1	17.9	28.9	65,861	–1.2
Liberal	7			▲1	12.5	28.3	64,550	+11.0
Independent	3			▼4	5.4	1.6	3,613	–2.8
