= 1979 Lancaster City Council election =

Election

- 3 May 1979

All 60 seats to Lancaster City Council 30 seats needed for a majority

	First party	Second party	Third party
Party	Conservative	Labour	Independent
Last election	43 seats	11 seats	5 seats
Seats won	36	14	7
Seat change		▲3	▲2
Popular vote		38,635	17,533
	Fourth party
Party	Liberal
Last election	1 seat
Seats won	3
Seat change	▲2
Popular vote	6,195
Leader before election
Conservative
Leader after election
Conservative

Composition of Lancaster City Council after the 1979 election

The 1979 Lancaster City Council election took place on 10 May 1979. This was on the same day as other local elections in England. New ward boundaries took effect for this election, increasing the number of seats from 59 to 60.

== Summary ==
The election resulted in a Conservative majority hold.

=== Election result ===
1979 Lancaster City Council
Party	Candidates	Seats	Gains	Losses	Net gain/loss	Seats %	Votes %	Votes	+/−
Conservative	56	36	8	6	▲2				
Labour	34	14	5	1	▲4				
Independent	16	7	3	2	▲1				
Liberal	5	3	2	0	▲2				

== Ward Results ==
=== Alexandra ===
Alexandra (3 seats)
Party	Candidate	Votes	%	±%
Labour	E. Garbutt	1,458	50.4	
Conservative	D. Kershaw	1,437	49.6	
Conservative	T. Reaney	1,370		
Conservative	K. Warren	1,300		
Turnout		5,565	72.2	
Labour gain from Conservative				
Conservative hold				
Conservative win (new seat)				

=== Arkholme ===
Arkholme (1 seat)
Party	Candidate	Votes	%	±%
Conservative	A. Jones	Unopposed		
Turnout		0	0.0	
Conservative hold				

=== Bolton-Le-Sands ===
Bolton-Le-Sands (2 seats)
Party	Candidate	Votes	%	±%
Conservative	W. Rigg	Unopposed		
Conservative	A. Briggs	Unopposed		
Turnout		0	0.0	
Conservative hold				
Conservative hold				

=== Bulk ===
Bulk (3 seats)
Party	Candidate	Votes	%	±%
Labour	A. Bryning	2,221	65.9	
Labour	R. Clark	2,052		
Labour	J. Yates Ms.	1,939		
Conservative	J. Rowley	1,148	34.1	
Conservative	R. Coletta	971		
Conservative	D. Redmayne	955		
Turnout		9,286	73.2	
Labour hold				
Labour hold				
Labour hold				

=== Carnforth ===
Carnforth (2 seats)
Party	Candidate	Votes	%	±%
Labour	J. Clarke	1,268	46.4	
Labour	E. Jones Ms.	1,188		
Conservative	J. McKelvie	761	27.9	
Conservative	C. Benson	705		
Independent	K. Townsend	702	25.7	
Independent	C. Davies	672		
Turnout		5,296	78.8	
Labour hold				
Labour hold				

=== Castle ===
Castle (3 seats)
Party	Candidate	Votes	%	±%
Conservative	W. Sweeney Ms.	1,493	37.7	
Labour	L. Shaw	1,309	33.0	
Labour	M. Clappen Ms.	1,294		
Labour	F. Roberts	1,287		
Independent	D. Brewer	1,163	29.3	
Conservative	R. Varey	1,065		
Independent	G. Woodhead	1,007		
Conservative	J. Cowbourne	859		
Turnout		9,477	75.4	
Conservative hold				
Labour hold				
Labour win (new seat)				

=== Caton ===
Caton (2 seats)
Party	Candidate	Votes	%	±%
Liberal	S. Mews	1,732	68.6	
Liberal	M. Rushton Ms.	1,260		
Conservative	M. Potts Ms.	791	31.4	
Conservative	M. Williams Ms.	746		
Turnout		5,529	81.1	
Liberal gain from Conservative				
Liberal gain from Conservative				

=== Ellel ===
Ellel (2 seats)
Party	Candidate	Votes	%	±%
Conservative	R. Carr	1,453	49.0	
Conservative	J. Lowthion	1,099		
Independent	R. Bibby	808	27.3	
Labour	W. Stafford	703	23.7	
Turnout		4,063	78.6	
Conservative gain from Independent				
Conservative hold				

=== Halton-With-Aughton ===
Halton-With-Aughton (1 seat)
Party	Candidate	Votes	%	±%
Conservative	H. Towers	Unopposed		
Turnout		0	0.0	
Conservative hold				

=== Harbour ===
Harbour (2 seats)
Party	Candidate	Votes	%	±%
Independent	D. Jackson	1,038	38.9	
Conservative	K. Brook	952	35.7	
Conservative	D. Sykes	764		
Labour	A. Leach	680	25.5	
Independent	D. Kennedy	541		
Labour	H. Rushton	524		
Turnout		4,499	78.8	
Independent hold				
Conservative hold				

=== Heysham Central ===
Heysham Central (2 seats)
Party	Candidate	Votes	%	±%
Independent	J. Taylor Ms.	1,587	60.3	
Conservative	T. Higginson	1,044	39.7	
Conservative	K. Wilson	1,014		
Turnout		3,645	77.7	
Independent hold				
Conservative hold				

=== Heysham North ===
Heysham North (2 seats)
Party	Candidate	Votes	%	±%
Conservative	M. Kennan	1,271	56.1	
Conservative	G. Bryan	1,268		
Liberal	M. Brown	996	43.9	
Turnout		3,535	73.9	
Conservative hold				
Conservative hold				

=== Heysham South ===
Heysham South (3 seats)
Party	Candidate	Votes	%	±%
Labour	S. Taylor	Unopposed		
Conservative	J. Downey	Unopposed		
Independent	N. Bolton Ms.	Unopposed		
Turnout		0	0.0	
Labour hold				
Conservative hold				
Independent hold				

=== Hornby ===
Hornby (1 seat)
Party	Candidate	Votes	%	±%
Conservative	D. Battersby	859	79.2	
Labour	J. Hayhurst	225	20.8	
Turnout		1,084	80.8	
Conservative hold				

=== John O'Gaunt ===
John O'Gaunt (3 seats)
Party	Candidate	Votes	%	±%
Independent	D. Leswer	2,491	56.5	
Independent	L. Jackson Ms.	1,915		
Independent	B. Freeman	1,783		
Conservative	T. Hayton	1,014	23.0	
Conservative	M. Lovett-Horn Ms.	977		
Labour	R. Allen	902	20.5	
Labour	L. Yates Ms.	863		
Labour	P. Kavanagh	848		
Conservative	H. Osliffe	840		
Turnout		10,633	77.9	
Independent gain from Conservative				
Independent gain from Conservative				
Independent gain from Conservative				

=== Kellet ===
Kellet (1 seat)
Party	Candidate	Votes	%	±%
Conservative	W. Goodfellow	Unopposed		
Turnout		0	0.0	
Conservative hold				

=== Overton ===
Overton (1 seat)
Party	Candidate	Votes	%	±%
Conservative	W. Mashiter	Unopposed		
Turnout		0	0.0	
Conservative hold				

=== Parks ===
Parks (2 seats)
Party	Candidate	Votes	%	±%
Conservative	I. Welldrake Ms.	1,473	55.2	
Conservative	J. Dawson	1,295		
Liberal	A. Orlowski Ms.	1,197	44.8	
Turnout		3,965	79.7	
Conservative hold				
Conservative hold				

=== Poulton ===
Poulton (3 seats)
Party	Candidate	Votes	%	±%
Conservative	S. Burns Ms.	1,562	49.3	
Conservative	M. Bicker	1,321		
Conservative	W. Thornton	1,296		
Labour	M. Harper	856	27.0	
Labour	B. Ogston	839		
Independent	W. Tempest	751	23.7	
Independent	A. Smith	530		
Turnout		7,155	69.7	
Conservative hold				
Conservative gain from Independent				
Conservative win (new seat)				

=== Scotforth East ===
Scotforth East (3 seats)
Party	Candidate	Votes	%	±%
Labour	J. Bicker	1,853	52.8	
Labour	E. Jones	1,789		
Labour	J. Lodge	1,709		
Conservative	R. Bushby	1,655	47.2	
Conservative	G. Swindlehurst	1,654		
Conservative	E. Stephens	1,340		
Turnout		10,000	70.8	
Labour win (new seat)				
Labour win (new seat)				
Labour win (new seat)				

=== Scotforth West ===
Scotforth West (3 seats)
Party	Candidate	Votes	%	±%
Conservative	J. Ball	1,692	58.7	
Conservative	E. Simpson	1,672		
Conservative	J. Outram	1,385		
Labour	I. Brown Ms.	1,191	41.3	
Labour	J. Harkins	1,184		
Labour	S. Randall Ms.	967		
Turnout		8,091	77.0	
Conservative win (new seat)				
Conservative win (new seat)				
Conservative win (new seat)				

=== Silverdale ===
Silverdale (1 seat)
Party	Candidate	Votes	%	±%
Conservative	A. Whitaker	Unopposed		
Turnout		0	0.0	
Conservative hold				

=== Skerton Central ===
Skerton Central (2 seats)
Party	Candidate	Votes	%	±%
Labour	D. Henderson Ms.	1,729	64.8	
Labour	J. Horner Ms.	1,408		
Conservative	J. Knott Ms.	939	35.2	
Turnout		4,076	76.8	
Labour hold				
Labour hold				

=== Skerton East ===
Skerton East (2 seats)
Party	Candidate	Votes	%	±%
Conservative	J. Richardson	1,033	52.0	
Conservative	H. Hind	1,017		
Labour	J. McCready	952	48.0	
Labour	J. O'Donnell	829		
Turnout		3,831	74.4	
Conservative hold				
Conservative gain from Labour				

=== Skerton West ===
Skerton West (2 seats)
Party	Candidate	Votes	%	±%
Conservative	J. Taylor Ms.	1,245	46.5	
Conservative	S. Smith	1,213		
Labour	L. Bagot	738	27.6	
Independent	M. Varey	695	26.0	
Labour	H. Walker	693		
Turnout		4,584	78.2	
Conservative hold				
Conservative hold				

=== Slyne-With-Hest ===
Slyne-With-Hest (2 seats)
Party	Candidate	Votes	%	±%
Conservative	R. Schofield	Unopposed		
Conservative	F. Wilcox	Unopposed		
Turnout		0	0.0	
Conservative hold				
Conservative hold				

=== Torrisholme ===
Torrisholme (2 seats)
Party	Candidate	Votes	%	±%
Conservative	P. Sumner	2,065	72.0	
Conservative	P. Whitworth	1,856		
Labour	D. Beesley	804	28.0	
Turnout		4,725	79.2	
Conservative hold				
Conservative hold				

=== Victoria ===
Victoria (3 seats)
Party	Candidate	Votes	%	±%
Independent	T. Langridge	1,850	41.0	
Conservative	T. Shingler	1,493	33.1	
Conservative	S. King Ms.	1,479		
Labour	C. Aimson	1,166	25.9	
Labour	P. Hooper	1,166		
Turnout		7,154	71.9	
Independent hold				
Conservative hold				
Conservative hold				

=== Warton ===
Warton (1 seat)
Party	Candidate	Votes	%	±%
Liberal	C. Peacock	1,010	70.7	
Conservative	A. Clarke	418	29.3	
Turnout		1,428	78.4	
Liberal hold				
