= 1979 Leicester City Council election =

1979 English local election

The 1979 Leicester City Council election took place on 3 May 1979 to elect members of Leicester City Council in England. This was on the same day as the 1979 general election and other local elections.

== Summary ==
1979 Leicester City Council election
Party	Seats	Gains	Losses	Net gain/loss	Seats %	Votes %	Votes	+/−
Labour	31			▲10	64.6	48.9	199,911	+13.6
Conservative	17			▼10	35.4	41.3	168,670	–1.9
National Front	0			Steady	0.0	4.9	19,900	–13.6
Liberal	0			Steady	0.0	4.7	19,241	+2.4
Independent	0			Steady	0.0	0.3	1,075	N/A
