= 1979 Waveney District Council election =

1979 English local government election

- 3 May 1979

All 57 seats to Waveney District Council 29 seats needed for a majority

	First party	Second party	Third party
Party	Conservative	Labour	Independent
Seats won	32	17	4
Seat change	▼7	▲4	▲4
Popular vote	77,511	73,881	3,677
Percentage	47.9%	45.7%	2.3%
Swing	▼2.5%	▲3.2%	▲2.0%
	Fourth party	Fifth party
Party	Liberal	Residents
Seats won	3	1
Seat change	▼1	Steady
Popular vote	5,756	1,005
Percentage	3.6%	0.6%
Swing	▼2.5%	▼0.1%
Control before election
Conservative
Control after election
Conservative

The 1979 Waveney District Council election took place on 3 May 1979 to elect members of Waveney District Council in Suffolk, England. This was on the same day as the 1979 general election and other local elections. Much the other local elections in 1979, Labour made up some lost ground compared to their loss in the general election but the Conservatives narrowly retained overall control of the council.

== Summary ==
=== Election result ===
1979 Waveney District Council election
Party	Candidates	Seats	Gains	Losses	Net gain/loss	Seats %	Votes %	Votes	+/−
Conservative	47	32	1	8	▼7	56.1	47.9	77,511	–2.5
Labour	49	17	5	1	▲4	29.8	45.7	73,881	+3.2
Independent	6	4	4	0	▲4	7.0	2.3	3,677	+2.0
Liberal	7	3	0	1	▼1	5.3	3.6	5,756	–2.5
Residents	1	1	0	0	Steady	1.8	0.6	1,005	–0.1

== Ward results ==
Incumbent councillors standing for re-election are marked with an asterisk (*). Changes in seats do not take into account by-elections or defections.

=== Beccles: North ===
Beccles: North (2 seats)
Party	Candidate	Votes	%	±%
Conservative	D. Hartley	907	55.6	
Labour	G. Westwood	802	49.2	
Conservative	E. Toogood	760	46.6	
Labour	E. Hobbins	623	38.2	
Turnout		~1,632	78.1	
Registered electors		2,089		
Conservative hold				
Labour gain from Conservative				

=== Beccles: South ===
Beccles: South (4 seats)
Party	Candidate	Votes	%	±%
Labour	R. Ellwood	2,136	55.1	
Labour	E. Crisp	2,029	52.4	
Labour	C. Andrew	1,792	46.3	
Conservative	D. Hipperson	1,740	44.9	
Labour	A. Hutchinson	1,725	44.5	
Conservative	B. Sabberton	1,573	40.6	
Conservative	R. Byron	1,564	40.4	
Conservative	B. Hewkin	1,466	37.9	
Turnout		~3,940	81.2	
Registered electors		4,851		
Labour hold				
Labour hold				
Labour hold				
Conservative hold				

=== Blundeston ===
Blundeston (2 seats)
Party	Candidate	Votes	%	±%
Conservative	D. Prettyman	1,398	58.7	
Conservative	J. Paul	1,375	57.8	
Labour	R. Dunne	984	41.3	
Turnout		~2,407	78.9	
Registered electors		3,051		
Conservative hold				
Conservative hold				

=== Brampton ===
Brampton
Party	Candidate	Votes	%	±%
Conservative	B. Slatter	490	59.0	
Labour	P. Thirtle	341	41.0	
Majority		149	18.0	
Turnout		~831	82.3	
Registered electors		1,010		
Conservative hold				

=== Bungay ===
Bungay (3 seats)
Party	Candidate	Votes	%	±%
Liberal	C. Richardson	1,661	65.9	
Labour	M. Sheppard	1,040	41.3	
Labour	R. Aldous	989	39.3	
Conservative	P. Cossart	905	35.9	
Conservative	C. Young	828	32.9	
Turnout		~2,520	79.1	
Registered electors		3,184		
Liberal hold				
Labour hold				
Labour gain from Conservative				

=== Carlton Colville ===
Carlton Colville (2 seats)
Party	Candidate	Votes	%	±%
Labour	R. Beales	1,054	36.6	
Independent	J. Mitchell	969	33.6	
Conservative	G. Neville	859	29.8	
Turnout		~2,249	79.3	
Registered electors		2,837		
Labour hold				
Independent gain from Conservative				

=== Halesworth ===
Halesworth (2 seats)
Party	Candidate	Votes	%	±%
Conservative	R. Niblett	1,220	51.5	
Conservative	J. Rees	1,121	47.3	
Labour	E. Leverett	1,066	45.0	
Labour	H. Holzer	1,025	43.3	
Turnout		~2,371	80.6	
Registered electors		2,941		
Conservative hold				
Conservative hold				

=== Holton ===
Holton
Party	Candidate	Votes	%	±%
Independent	E. Woodard	484	51.2	
Conservative	J. Jolly	462	48.8	
Majority		22	2.4	
Turnout		~946	83.4	
Registered electors		1,134		
Independent gain from Conservative				

=== Ilketshall ===
Ilketshall
Party	Candidate	Votes	%	±%
Conservative	S. Wilson	568	64.5	
Independent	W. Hall	190	21.6	
Labour	W. Wegg	123	14.0	
Majority		378	42.9	
Turnout		~881	80.6	
Registered electors		1,093		
Conservative hold				

=== Kessingland ===
Kessingland (2 seats)
Party	Candidate	Votes	%	±%
Conservative	E. Martin	1,245	55.7	
Labour	R. Saunders	1,061	47.5	
Conservative	I. Revell	1,059	47.4	
Turnout		~2,236	76.7	
Registered electors		2,914		
Conservative hold				
Labour gain from Liberal				

=== Lowestoft: Carlton ===
Lowestoft: Carlton (6 seats)
Party	Candidate	Votes	%	±%
Conservative	J. Scarles	3,054	53.3	
Conservative	D. Mellor	2,932	51.1	
Conservative	C. Mutimer	2,900	50.6	
Conservative	D. Miner	2,827	49.3	
Conservative	K. Priestley	2,756	48.1	
Conservative	L. Willert	2,709	47.3	
Labour	L. Davies	2,672	46.7	
Labour	D. Gower	2,647	46.2	
Labour	T. Kelly	2,615	45.6	
Labour	T. Devine	2,445	42.6	
Labour	A. Murgatroyd	2,284	39.8	
Labour	G. Owers	2,244	39.1	
Turnout		~6,425	78.8	
Registered electors		8,152		
Conservative hold				
Conservative hold				
Conservative hold				
Conservative hold				
Conservative hold				
Conservative hold				

=== Lowestoft: Central & Waveney ===
Lowestoft: Central & Waveney (3 seats)
Party	Candidate	Votes	%	±%
Liberal	J. Sparham	1,163	36.0	
Liberal	A. Shepherd	1,006	31.1	
Residents	H. Kirby	1,005	31.1	
Labour	D. Mathew	897	27.8	
Labour	D. Baldwin	876	27.1	
Labour	H. Porter	870	26.9	
Independent	A. Furlong-Osborne	162	5.0	
Turnout		~2,375	77.4	
Registered electors		3,070		
Liberal hold				
Liberal hold				
Residents hold				

=== Lowestoft: Gunton ===
Lowestoft: Gunton (5 seats)
Party	Candidate	Votes	%	±%
Conservative	N. Brighouse	2,833	53.8	
Conservative	D. Cullum	2,773	52.7	
Conservative	J. Aldous	2,692	51.2	
Conservative	W. Hervey	2,586	49.2	
Conservative	D. Porter	2,584	49.1	
Labour	R. Durrant	2,428	46.2	
Labour	A. Bateman	2,392	45.5	
Labour	R. Ford	2,288	43.5	
Labour	A. Owen	2,280	43.4	
Labour	N. McNorton	2,207	42.0	
Turnout		~5,662	75.6	
Registered electors		7,491		
Conservative hold				
Conservative hold				
Conservative hold				
Conservative hold				
Conservative hold				

=== Lowestoft: Kirkley ===
Lowestoft: Kirkley (2 seats)
Party	Candidate	Votes	%	±%
Labour	S. Ellis	1,433	55.7	
Conservative	R. Calvert	1,140	44.3	
Labour	J. Page	1,088	42.3	
Conservative	M. Wigg	1,078	41.9	
Turnout		~2,613	80.7	
Registered electors		3,237		
Labour hold				
Conservative gain from Labour				

=== Lowestoft: Oulton Broad ===
Lowestoft: Oulton Broad (5 seats)
Party	Candidate	Votes	%	±%
Conservative	M. Barnard	3,240	52.6	
Conservative	E. Back	2,998	48.7	
Conservative	H. Turner	2,963	48.1	
Conservative	A. Leedham	2,948	47.8	
Conservative	A. Choveaux	2,942	47.7	
Labour	B. Hunter	2,922	47.4	
Labour	T. Chipperfield	2,879	46.7	
Labour	K. Hunting	2,348	38.1	
Labour	M. Ramsay	2,254	36.6	
Labour	G. Coleman	2,208	35.8	
Turnout		~6,418	78.6	
Registered electors		8,168		
Conservative hold				
Conservative hold				
Conservative hold				
Conservative hold				
Conservative hold				

=== Lowestoft: Pakefield ===
Lowestoft: Pakefield (3 seats)
Party	Candidate	Votes	%	±%
Labour	J. Lark	2,028	57.5	
Conservative	M. Richardson	1,496	42.5	
Conservative	M. Gallidoro	1,487	42.2	
Labour	A. Martin	1,449	41.1	
Conservative	D. Hugo	1,411	40.0	
Labour	A. Millner	1,277	36.2	
Turnout		~3,632	82.3	
Registered electors		4,414		
Labour hold				
Conservative hold				
Conservative hold				

=== Lowestoft: Roman Hill ===
Lowestoft: Roman Hill (2 seats)
Party	Candidate	Votes	%	±%
Labour	P. Hunt	1,169	65.3	
Labour	J. Reynolds	1,074	60.0	
Liberal	B. Pointon	620	34.7	
Liberal	A. Moles	581	32.5	
Turnout		~1,934	76.7	
Registered electors		2,521		
Labour hold				
Labour hold				

=== Lowestoft: St. Johns ===
Lowestoft: St. Johns (2 seats)
Party	Candidate	Votes	%	±%
Labour	T. Carter	940	50.9	
Labour	A. Jurd	767	41.6	
Conservative	V. Francis	727	39.4	
Liberal	C. Shade	382	20.7	
Liberal	J. Kerry	343	18.6	
Turnout		~1,850	74.8	
Registered electors		2,474		
Labour hold				
Labour hold				

=== Lowestoft: St. Margarets ===
Lowestoft: St. Margarets (2 seats)
Party	Candidate	Votes	%	±%
Labour	H. Chamberlain	1,017	55.9	
Labour	A. Jeffreys	960	52.7	
Conservative	J. Wren	803	44.1	
Conservative	P. Paul	753	41.3	
Turnout		~1,956	80.0	
Registered electors		2,445		
Labour hold				
Labour gain from Conservative				

=== Reydon ===
Reydon (2 seats)
Party	Candidate	Votes	%	±%
Conservative	S. Simpson	1,039	53.2	
Conservative	G. Johnson	949	48.6	
Labour	A. Fryatt	913	46.8	
Turnout		~1,965	76.9	
Registered electors		2,554		
Conservative hold				
Conservative hold				

=== Southelmham ===
Southelmham
Party	Candidate	Votes	%	±%
Conservative	J. Stacey	Unopposed		
Registered electors		970		
Conservative hold				

=== Southwold ===
Southwold (2 seats)
Party	Candidate	Votes	%	±%
Independent	S. Waters	997	71.2	
Independent	J. Adnams	875	62.5	
Labour	A. Swan	403	28.8	
Turnout		~1,425	81.8	
Registered electors		1,741		
Independent gain from Conservative				
Independent gain from Conservative				

=== Worlingham ===
Worlingham
Party	Candidate	Votes	%	±%
Conservative	P. Plummer	958	70.4	
Labour	F. Moore	403	29.6	
Majority		555	40.8	
Turnout		~1,361	79.0	
Registered electors		1,723		
Conservative hold				

=== Wrentham ===
Wrentham
Party	Candidate	Votes	%	±%
Labour	A. Child	414	51.3	
Conservative	E. Torlot	393	48.7	
Majority		21	2.6	
Turnout		807	77.1	
Registered electors		1,047		
Labour gain from Conservative				
