= 1979 Colchester Borough Council election =

1979 UK local government election

- 3 May 1979

20 out of 60 seats to Colchester Borough Council 31 seats needed for a majority
- Registered: 83,053
- Turnout: 73.9% (▲30.4%)
	First party	Second party
Party	Conservative	Labour
Last election	37 seats, 53.1%	21 seats, 41.7%
Seats won	13	6
Seats after	36	21
Seat change	▼1	Steady
Popular vote	30,316	22,644
Percentage	50.2%	37.5%
Swing	▼2.9%	▼4.2%
	Third party	Fourth party
Party	Residents	Independent
Last election	1 seat, 2.2%	1 seat, 0.0%
Seats won	1	0
Seats after	2	1
Seat change	▲1	Steady
Popular vote	2,541	Did not stand
Percentage	4.2%	Did not stand
Swing	▲2.0%	N/A
- Winner of each seat at the 1979 Colchester Borough Council election.
Council control before election
Conservative
Council control after election
Conservative

The 1979 Colchester Borough Council election took place on 3 May 1979 to elect members to Colchester Borough Council in Essex, England. This was on the same day as the 1979 general election and other local elections across the United Kingdom.

The Conservatives held their position against Labour, with both parties losing vote share. The Conservatives lost a seat to a Residents Association candidate in Tiptree.

== Summary ==
1979 Colchester Borough Council election
Party	This election				Full council			This election		
Party	Candidates	Seats	Net	Seats %	Other	Total	Total %	Votes	Votes %	+/−
Conservative	20	13	▼1	65.0	23	36	60.0	30,316	50.2	–2.9
Labour	19	6	Steady	30.0	15	21	35.0	22,644	37.5	–4.2
Residents	1	1	▲1	5.0	1	2	3.3	2,541	4.2	+2.0
Independent	0	0	Steady	0.0	1	1	1.7	N/A (Note: Did not stand candidates.)	N/A	N/A
Liberal	8	0	Steady	0.0	0	0	0.0	4,867	8.1	+5.1

== Ward results ==
=== Berechurch ===
Berechurch
Party	Candidate	Votes	%	±%
Labour	C. Howe	1,941	48.0	+7.5
Conservative	V. Worth	1,388	34.3	–1.2
Liberal	Martin Hunt	716	17.7	–6.3
Majority		553	13.7	+8.7
Turnout		4,045	73.5	+31.9
Registered electors		5,611		
Labour hold		Swing	▲3.9	

=== Castle ===
Castle
Party	Candidate	Votes	%	±%
Labour	J. Dunn	1,643	46.6	–10.3
Conservative	A. Beevers	1,457	41.3	+4.4
Liberal	William Spyvee	425	12.1	+5.9
Majority		186	5.3	–14.7
Turnout		3,525	73.7	+23.3
Registered electors		4,861		
Labour hold		Swing	▼7.4	

=== Copford & Eight Ash Green ===
Copford & Eight Ash Green
Party	Candidate	Votes	%	±%
Conservative	M. Wilde	1,139	73.0	–3.6
Labour	V. McAndrew	422	27.0	+3.6
Majority		717	45.9	–7.3
Turnout		1,561	78.5	+30.9
Registered electors		2,012		
Conservative hold		Swing	▼3.6	

=== Great & Little Horksley ===
Great & Little Horksley
Party	Candidate	Votes	%	±%
Conservative	W. Knighton	1,086	78.1	N/A
Labour	J. Coombes	305	21.9	N/A
Majority		781	56.2	N/A
Turnout		1,391	80.7	N/A
Registered electors		1,744		
Conservative hold		Swing	N/A	

=== Great Tey ===
Great Tey
Party	Candidate	Votes	%	±%
Conservative	R. Browning	912	80.6	N/A
Labour	Jean Quinn	220	19.4	N/A
Majority		692	61.1	N/A
Turnout		1,132	78.7	N/A
Registered electors		1,451		
Conservative hold		Swing	N/A	

=== Harbour ===
Harbour
Party	Candidate	Votes	%	±%
Labour	H. Smith	2,019	53.5	–2.9
Conservative	M. Coyne	1,756	46.5	+2.9
Majority		263	7.0	–5.9
Turnout		3,775	77.1	+28.3
Registered electors		4,971		
Labour gain from Conservative		Swing	▼2.9	

=== Lexden ===
Lexden
Party	Candidate	Votes	%	±%
Conservative	C. Sargeant	1,942	61.9	–19.6
Liberal	Ian Trusler	690	22.0	N/A
Labour	R. Lown	504	16.1	–2.4
Majority		1,252	39.9	–23.1
Turnout		3,136	80.1	+31.9
Registered electors		3,969		
Conservative hold		Swing	N/A	

=== Mile End ===
Mile End
Party	Candidate	Votes	%	±%
Conservative	R. Fulton	1,619	60.5	–7.3
Labour	Tim Oxton	1,059	39.5	+7.3
Majority		560	20.9	–14.7
Turnout		2,678	75.8	+30.9
Registered electors		3,579		
Conservative hold		Swing	▼7.3	

=== New Town ===
New Town
Party	Candidate	Votes	%	±%
Labour	D. Williams	2,052	60.8	+4.2
Conservative	L. Leader	1,323	39.2	+2.0
Majority		729	21.6	+2.2
Turnout		3,375	75.3	+30.6
Registered electors		4,548		
Labour hold		Swing	▲1.1	

No Liberal candidate as previous (–6.2).

=== Prettygate ===
Prettygate
Party	Candidate	Votes	%	±%
Conservative	F. Klayter	2,173	54.1	–14.6
Labour	B. Sawyer	1,091	27.2	–4.1
Liberal	M. Fisher	750	18.7	N/A
Majority		1,082	27.0	–8.7
Turnout		4,014	82.7	+37.1
Registered electors		4,924		
Conservative hold		Swing	▼5.3	

=== Pyefleet ===
Pyefleet
Party	Candidate	Votes	%	±%
Conservative	A. Parsonson	768	75.9	+0.9
Labour	J. Jopling	244	24.1	–0.9
Majority		524	51.8	+1.8
Turnout		1,012	83.5	+22.3
Registered electors		1,225		
Conservative hold		Swing	▲0.9	

=== Shrub End ===
Shrub End
Party	Candidate	Votes	%	±%
Labour	Frank Wilkin	1,818	57.5	–1.8
Conservative	M. Nicholls	1,345	42.5	+1.8
Majority		473	15.0	–3.6
Turnout		3,163	57.2	+24.4
Registered electors		5,601		
Labour hold		Swing	▼1.8	

=== St. Andrews ===
St. Andrews
Party	Candidate	Votes	%	±%
Labour	D. Braddy	2,668	55.2	–11.8
Conservative	T. McArdle	1,570	32.5	–0.5
Liberal	Y. Holley	597	12.3	N/A
Majority		1,098	22.7	–11.3
Turnout		4,835	66.8	+35.9
Registered electors		7,341		
Labour hold		Swing	▲2.1	

=== St. Annes ===
St. Annes
Party	Candidate	Votes	%	±%
Conservative	R. Pawsey	1,649	50.1	+7.0
Labour	J. Fraser	1,644	49.9	–7.0
Majority		5	0.2	N/A
Turnout		3,293	76.3	+34.0
Registered electors		4,389		
Conservative gain from Labour		Swing	▲7.0	

=== St. Johns ===
St. Johns
Party	Candidate	Votes	%	±%
Conservative	B. West	1,782	64.3	–6.4
Labour	C. Graves	991	35.7	+6.4
Majority		791	28.5	–12.8
Turnout		2,773	80.6	+33.9
Registered electors		3,481		
Conservative hold		Swing	▼6.4	

=== St. Marys ===
St. Marys
Party	Candidate	Votes	%	±%
Conservative	P. Spendlove	2,137	59.6	–6.5
Labour	K. Taylor	819	22.9	+2.0
Liberal	R. Baker	628	17.5	+4.5
Majority		1,318	36.8	–8.4
Turnout		3,584	75.9	+30.9
Registered electors		4,790		
Conservative hold		Swing	▼4.3	

=== Stanway ===
Stanway
Party	Candidate	Votes	%	±%
Conservative	P. Holloway	1,528	53.8	–0.5
Labour	D. Rose	800	28.1	–17.6
Liberal	M .Livermore	514	18.1	N/A
Majority		728	25.6	+17.0
Turnout		2,842	78.7	+30.5
Registered electors		3,661		
Conservative hold		Swing	▲9.6	

=== Tiptree ===
Tiptree
Party	Candidate	Votes	%	±%
Residents	J. Webb	2,541	58.0	+20.8
Conservative	C. Cansdale	1,294	29.5	–19.3
Liberal	I. Thurgood	547	12.5	N/A
Majority		1,247	28.5	N/A
Turnout		4,382	77.5	+42.1
Registered electors		5,653		
Residents gain from Conservative		Swing	▲20.1	

No Labour candidate as previous (–13.2).

=== West Mersea ===
West Mersea
Party	Candidate	Votes	%	±%
Conservative	J. Williams	2,645	83.5	–4.0
Labour	J. Hockenhull	523	16.5	+4.0
Majority		2,131	67.1	–8.0
Turnout		3,177	74.0	+37.3
Registered electors		4,238		
Conservative hold		Swing	▼4.0	

=== Wivenhoe ===
Wivenhoe
Party	Candidate	Votes	%	±%
Conservative	M. Last	1,889	51.1	+5.1
Labour	M. Dunne	1,811	48.9	–5.1
Majority		78	2.1	N/A
Turnout		3,700	75.3	+31.7
Registered electors		5,004		
Conservative hold		Swing	▲5.1	
