= 1979 St Albans City and District Council election =

1979 English local election

The 1979 St Albans City and District Council election took place on 3 May 1979 to elect members of St Albans City and District Council in England. This was on the same day as the 1979 general election and other local elections.

== Summary ==
1979 St Albans City and District Council election
Party	Seats	Gains	Losses	Net gain/loss	Seats %	Votes %	Votes	+/−
Conservative	43			▼2	75.4	57.2	102,314	–3.6
Labour	8			▲2	14.0	26.4	47,191	±0.0
Independent	3			▲2	5.3	3.5	6,210	+2.9
Liberal	2			▲1	3.5	11.7	20,942	+0.5
Ind. Conservative	1			Steady	1.8	1.2	2,096	+0.2
