= 1979 Luton Borough Council election =

Local election in England

- 3 May 1979

All 48 seats to Luton Borough Council 25 seats needed for a majority

	First party	Second party	Third party
Party	Conservative	Labour	Liberal
Seats won	32	16	0
Seat change	▼5	▲6	▼1
Popular vote	108,693	96,170	40,200
Percentage	44.2%	39.1%	16.3%
Swing	▼2.3%	▲5.3%	▼2.3%
Control before election
Conservative
Control after election
Conservative

The 1979 Luton Borough Council election took place on 3 May 1979 to elect members of Luton Borough Council in Bedfordshire, England. This was on the same day as the 1979 general election and other local elections.

== Summary ==
=== Election result ===
1979 Luton Borough Council election
Party	Candidates	Seats	Gains	Losses	Net gain/loss	Seats %	Votes %	Votes	+/−
Conservative	48	32	0	5	▼5	66.7	44.2	108,693	–2.3
Labour	48	16	6	0	▲6	33.3	39.1	96,170	+5.3
Liberal	48	0	0	1	▼1	0.0	16.3	40,200	–2.3
National Front	6	0	0	0	Steady	0.0	0.3	816	+0.1
Independent	1	0	0	0	Steady	0.0	<0.1	105	–0.7

== Ward results ==
Incumbent councillors standing for re-election are marked with an asterisk (*). Changes in seats do not take into account by-elections or defections.

=== Biscot ===
Biscot (3 seats)
Party	Candidate	Votes	%	±%
Labour	A. Sedgemore	2,377	45.7	+19.0
Labour	S. Gonshor	2,347	45.2	+19.4
Labour	W. McKenzie	2,215	42.6	+19.8
Conservative	G. Hickinbottom*	1,950	37.5	–16.8
Conservative	K. Woodbridge*	1,850	35.6	–15.3
Conservative	M. Langlois*	1,793	34.5	–14.1
Liberal	L. Gresham	632	12.2	+1.5
Liberal	A. Johnson	568	10.9	+0.3
Liberal	B. Roe	426	8.2	–1.6
Independent	J. Bardwaj	105	2.0	–2.6
Turnout		~5,198	73.8	+35.4
Registered electors		7,043		
Labour gain from Conservative				
Labour gain from Conservative				
Labour gain from Conservative				

=== Bramingham ===
Bramingham (3 seats)
Party	Candidate	Votes	%	±%
Conservative	P. Glenister*	1,618	46.9	–4.9
Conservative	F. Lester*	1,529	44.3	–6.4
Conservative	L. Pane*	1,499	43.4	–5.6
Labour	M. Carr	1,337	38.7	+17.5
Labour	H. Brown	1,307	37.9	+18.1
Labour	C. Neufville	1,209	35.0	+15.3
Liberal	H. Balfour	431	12.5	–8.1
Liberal	E. Jenner	377	10.9	–7.2
Liberal	A. Doris	375	10.9	–6.5
Turnout		~3,452	75.8	+25.3
Registered electors		4,554		
Conservative hold				
Conservative hold				
Conservative hold				

=== Challney ===
Challney (3 seats)
Party	Candidate	Votes	%	±%
Conservative	G. Boote*	3,130	50.2	–2.0
Conservative	B. Dodd*	3,029	48.6	–3.4
Conservative	M. McCarroll*	2,977	47.8	–2.1
Labour	G. Carr	2,177	34.9	+9.1
Labour	V. Kennedy	2,163	34.7	+10.1
Labour	W. Lawrence	2,052	32.9	+9.1
Liberal	E. Cooke	760	12.2	+0.3
Liberal	S. Smith	659	10.6	+1.1
Liberal	B. Thanki	529	8.5	–0.8
Turnout		~6,230	77.6	+38.2
Registered electors		8,028		
Conservative hold				
Conservative hold				
Conservative hold				

=== Crawley ===
Crawley (3 seats)
Party	Candidate	Votes	%	±%
Conservative	K. Connolly*	2,366	41.2	–0.5
Conservative	J. Lucas*	2,329	40.5	–0.2
Conservative	R. Dean*	2,258	39.3	–1.2
Labour	C. Jephson	2,176	37.9	+6.7
Labour	J. Adams	2,171	37.8	+7.1
Labour	E. Hunt	1,982	34.5	+4.3
Liberal	R. Brown	949	16.5	–3.1
Liberal	W. Cross	891	15.5	–1.3
Liberal	P. Rose	829	14.4	–2.4
Turnout		~5,744	78.6	+32.3
Registered electors		7,308		
Conservative hold				
Conservative hold				
Conservative hold				

=== Dallow ===
Dallow (3 seats)
Party	Candidate	Votes	%	±%
Labour	E. Scanlan*	2,796	52.0	+10.5
Labour	D. Fuller*	2,744	51.1	+10.6
Labour	W. Pratt	2,619	48.7	+10.1
Conservative	R. Dudley*	1,665	31.0	–8.8
Conservative	P. Burrett	1,641	30.5	–4.4
Conservative	R. Samuels	1,523	28.3	–5.2
Liberal	J. Stephens	542	10.1	–1.4
Liberal	S. Stephens	515	9.6	–0.6
Liberal	C. Stott	440	8.2	–1.3
National Front	D. Ellames	194	3.6	N/A
National Front	D. Williams	114	2.1	N/A
National Front	G. Williams	94	1.7	N/A
Turnout		~5,374	73.6	+36.8
Registered electors		7,301		
Labour hold				
Labour hold				
Labour gain from Conservative				

=== Farley ===
Farley (3 seats)
Party	Candidate	Votes	%	±%
Labour	T. Jenkins*	2,754	52.1	–3.2
Labour	T. Kenneally*	2,722	51.5	–2.2
Labour	R. Jeffries	2,640	50.0	–0.9
Conservative	S. Hills	1,537	29.1	+2.1
Conservative	A. Flint	1,509	28.6	+4.3
Conservative	L. Scott	1,441	27.3	+3.9
Liberal	S. Boutwood	634	12.0	+3.2
Liberal	V. Perryman	590	11.2	+3.7
Liberal	J. Weber	534	10.1	+3.2
National Front	J. Hennem	145	2.7	–4.8
National Front	D. Brennan	136	2.6	N/A
National Front	D. Hennem	133	2.5	N/A
Turnout		~5,285	73.4	+35.3
Registered electors		7,200		
Labour hold				
Labour hold				
Labour hold				

=== High Town ===
High Town (3 seats)
Party	Candidate	Votes	%	±%
Conservative	A. Flint*	2,185	44.0	+0.8
Conservative	C. Everard*	2,161	43.5	+0.5
Conservative	M. Hunter*	2,073	41.7	+1.3
Labour	H. Heather	1,762	35.5	+4.8
Labour	I. Jamieson	1,580	31.8	+2.0
Labour	S. Debgupta	1,431	28.8	+3.1
Liberal	J. Fensome	971	19.5	–5.1
Liberal	C. Fensome	859	17.3	–1.6
Liberal	F. Shillingford	609	12.3	–5.4
Turnout		~4,969	73.3	+33.1
Registered electors		6,779		
Conservative hold				
Conservative hold				
Conservative hold				

=== Icknield ===
Icknield (3 seats)
Party	Candidate	Votes	%	±%
Conservative	R. Cartwright*	3,947	67.0	–5.6
Conservative	B. Dunington*	3,923	66.6	–4.1
Conservative	D. Johnston*	3,785	64.2	–4.2
Labour	W. Nixon	1,172	19.9	+2.4
Labour	J. Thorpe	1,164	19.8	+2.3
Labour	D. Wood	1,103	18.7	+3.3
Liberal	B. Mitchell	618	10.5	+1.2
Liberal	J. Mitchell	565	9.6	+1.9
Liberal	J. Roe	526	8.9	+3.5
Turnout		~5,892	83.0	+34.8
Registered electors		7,099		
Conservative hold				
Conservative hold				
Conservative hold				

=== Leagrave ===
Leagrave (3 seats)
Party	Candidate	Votes	%	±%
Conservative	M. Garrett*	2,608	44.6	+4.6
Conservative	J. Goldsmith*	2,413	41.3	+3.5
Labour	J. Hamill	2,376	40.6	+8.3
Conservative	P. Locke*	2,337	40.0	+3.3
Labour	M. Payne	2,317	39.6	+9.5
Labour	M. Stewart	2,261	38.7	+10.4
Liberal	C. Mead	751	12.8	–13.7
Liberal	M. Paul	691	11.8	–11.0
Liberal	G. Thanki	480	8.2	–14.0
Turnout		~5,858	75.9	+31.1
Registered electors		7,705		
Conservative hold				
Conservative hold				
Labour gain from Conservative				

=== Lewsey ===
Lewsey (3 seats)
Party	Candidate	Votes	%	±%
Labour	D. Kennedy*	2,845	50.4	–0.1
Labour	R. Lucas	2,579	45.7	–1.6
Labour	E. Lurkings	2,437	43.2	–2.3
Conservative	M. Boutwood	1,940	34.4	+5.1
Conservative	P. Edwards	1,913	33.9	+4.7
Conservative	C. Priede	1,787	31.7	+2.6
Liberal	D. Degrout	623	11.0	–2.8
Liberal	D. Larkman	620	11.0	–2.7
Liberal	P. Larkman	604	10.7	–1.1
Turnout		~5,644	74.2	+42.1
Registered electors		7,606		
Labour hold				
Labour hold				
Labour hold				

=== Limbury ===
Limbury (3 seats)
Party	Candidate	Votes	%	±%
Conservative	A. Quinn	2,658	45.8	–0.9
Conservative	G. Payne*	2,620	45.1	+0.5
Conservative	M. Taylor	2,559	44.1	–0.1
Labour	J. Bailey	2,228	38.4	–1.2
Labour	R. Sills	2,078	35.8	–3.2
Labour	B. Woolner	2,036	35.1	–0.9
Liberal	M. Dolling	889	15.3	+6.2
Liberal	A. Farrow	700	12.1	+3.5
Liberal	J. Blindell	672	11.6	+3.0
Turnout		~5,805	79.9	+35.4
Registered electors		7,265		
Conservative hold				
Conservative hold				
Conservative hold				

=== Putteridge ===
Putteridge (3 seats)
Party	Candidate	Votes	%	±%
Conservative	L. Chantler	2,378	36.6	–2.3
Conservative	S. Webster*	2,332	35.9	–1.7
Conservative	D. Curd*	2,247	34.6	–2.9
Liberal	R. Davies	2,233	34.4	+8.2
Liberal	D. Clooney	1,996	30.7	+5.9
Liberal	D. Woodroffe	1,935	29.8	+5.2
Labour	J. Jenkins	1,791	27.6	–2.0
Labour	K. Bruckdorfer	1,730	26.6	–2.7
Labour	J. Thakoordin	1,521	23.4	–3.9
Turnout		~6,493	83.4	+33.1
Registered electors		7,785		
Conservative hold				
Conservative hold				
Conservative hold				

=== Saints ===
Saints (3 seats)
Party	Candidate	Votes	%	±%
Conservative	W. Copeland*	2,908	50.5	+1.2
Conservative	T. Cunningham	2,797	48.5	+1.1
Conservative	P. Wolsey*	2,726	47.3	+2.4
Labour	K. Hopkins	1,945	33.7	+12.2
Labour	P. Broadhead	1,924	33.4	+12.1
Labour	R. Shannon	1,906	33.1	+12.4
Liberal	M. Robinson	706	12.2	–9.4
Liberal	L. Cooke	700	12.1	–8.1
Liberal	D. Stott	581	10.1	–8.0
Turnout		~5,764	77.9	+30.5
Registered electors		7,399		
Conservative hold				
Conservative hold				
Conservative hold				

=== South ===
South (3 seats)
Party	Candidate	Votes	%	±%
Conservative	L. Benson*	2,431	47.3	–1.1
Conservative	A. Bush	2,375	46.3	+0.7
Conservative	D. Boustred	2,361	46.0	+0.9
Labour	K. Cowan	1,794	34.9	+2.3
Labour	R. Macey	1,764	34.4	+3.0
Labour	M. Taylor	1,735	33.8	+8.9
Liberal	P. Chapman	735	14.3	+1.7
Liberal	H. Johnson	631	12.3	–0.2
Liberal	B. Legg	618	12.0	+0.9
Turnout		~5,134	68.9	+32.9
Registered electors		7,452		
Conservative hold				
Conservative hold				
Conservative hold				

=== Stopsley ===
Stopsley (3 seats)
Party	Candidate	Votes	%	±%
Conservative	G. Dillingham*	2,353	42.0	–3.5
Conservative	G. Davies*	2,308	41.2	–2.0
Conservative	A. Lucas*	2,195	39.1	–3.1
Labour	D. Grayson	1,578	28.1	+3.1
Labour	J. Courty	1,508	26.9	+2.0
Labour	D. Mulligan	1,436	25.6	+0.8
Liberal	E. Davies	1,419	25.3	–0.7
Liberal	M. McNally	1,231	22.0	±0.0
Liberal	H. Roe	1,198	21.4	–0.5
Turnout		~5,607	79.9	+30.8
Registered electors		7,018		
Conservative hold				
Conservative hold				
Conservative hold				

=== Sundon Park ===
Sundon Park (3 seats)
Party	Candidate	Votes	%	±%
Labour	W. Cooney	2,205	37.1	–1.8
Labour	E. Haldane*	2,139	36.0	+0.6
Labour	R. Robertson	2,037	34.3	+3.7
Liberal	C. Hinkley*	1,969	33.2	–3.8
Liberal	D. Hinkley	1,940	32.7	–2.1
Conservative	A. Banville	1,680	28.3	+3.9
Conservative	E. Leather	1,601	27.0	+4.5
Liberal	J. James	1,593	26.8	–6.5
Conservative	S. Tucker	1,448	24.4	+4.5
Turnout		~5,936	77.4	+32.5
Registered electors		7,669		
Labour hold				
Labour hold				
Labour gain from Liberal				
