= 1979 Babergh District Council election =

1979 English local government election

- 3 May 1979

All 42 seats to Babergh District Council 22 seats needed for a majority

	First party	Second party	Third party
Party	Conservative	Independent	Labour
Seats won	17	17	5
Seat change	Steady	▲2	▲1
Popular vote	16,451	8,422	12,547
Percentage	42.6%	21.8%	32.5%
Swing	▼1.8%	▲5.8%	▲3.7%
	Fourth party	Fifth party
Party	Liberal	Residents
Seats won	2	1
Seat change	▲1	Steady
Popular vote	1,209	Unopposed
Percentage	3.1%	Unopposed
Swing	▼4.5%	▼3.2%
- Winner of each seat at the 1979 Babergh District Council election.
Control before election
No overall control
Control after election
No overall control

The 1979 Babergh District Council election took place on 3 May 1979 to elect members of Babergh District Council in Suffolk, England. This was on the same day as other local elections.

New ward boundaries came into effect at this election increasing the number of seats by 4 to 42.

== Summary ==
=== Election result ===
1979 Babergh District Council election
Party	Candidates	Seats	Gains	Losses	Net gain/loss	Seats %	Votes %	Votes	+/−
Conservative	25	17	N/A	N/A	Steady	40.5	42.6	16,451	–1.8
Independent	21	17	N/A	N/A	▲2	40.5	21.8	8,422	+5.8
Labour	18	5	N/A	N/A	▲1	11.9	32.5	12,547	+3.7
Liberal	2	2	N/A	N/A	▲1	4.8	3.1	1,209	–4.5
Residents	1	1	N/A	N/A	Steady	2.4	N/A	N/A	–3.2

== Ward results ==
Incumbent councillors standing for re-election are marked with an asterisk (*). Changes in seats do not take into account by-elections or defections.

=== Alton ===
Alton
Party	Candidate	Votes	%	±%
Labour	R. Cook	488	57.9	
Conservative	J. Fraser	355	42.1	
Majority		133	15.8	
Turnout		843	74.9	
Registered electors		1,125		
Labour gain from Conservative		Swing		

=== Berners ===
Berners
Party	Candidate	Votes	%	±%
Independent	E. Pollard*	Unopposed		
Registered electors		1,242		
Independent hold				

=== Bildeston ===
Bildeston
Party	Candidate	Votes	%	±%
Independent	O. Simpson*	Unopposed		
Registered electors		1,226		
Independent hold				

=== Boxford ===
Boxford
Party	Candidate	Votes	%	±%
Independent	T. Dawson	Unopposed		
Registered electors		1,444		
Independent hold				

=== Brantham ===
Brantham
Party	Candidate	Votes	%	±%
Independent	J. Truswell	Unopposed		
Registered electors		1,571		
Independent hold				

=== Brett Vale ===
Brett Vale
Party	Candidate	Votes	%	±%
Conservative	E. Green*	545	62.6	
Independent	F. Pratten	326	37.4	
Majority		219	25.2	
Turnout		871	73.2	
Registered electors		1,190		
Conservative hold		Swing		

=== Brookvale ===
Brookvale
Party	Candidate	Votes	%	±%
Independent	J. Baxter*	Unopposed		
Registered electors		1,618		
Independent hold				

=== Bures St. Mary ===
Bures St. Mary
Party	Candidate	Votes	%	±%
Conservative	H. Engleheart*	Unopposed		
Registered electors		1,275		
Conservative hold				

=== Capel & Wenham ===
Capel & Wenham (2 seats)
Party	Candidate	Votes	%	±%
Conservative	H. Rossiter	1,115	51.9	
Labour	R. Pearce*	1,030	48.0	
Labour	T. Richardson	633	29.5	
Turnout		~2,146	97.9	
Registered electors		2,191		
Conservative win (new seat)				
Labour hold				

=== Chadacre ===
Chadacre
Party	Candidate	Votes	%	±%
Independent	G. Ince*	Unopposed		
Registered electors		1,587		
Independent hold				

=== Copdock ===
Copdock
Party	Candidate	Votes	%	±%
Independent	T. Carey	729	61.3	
Conservative	F. Lloyd	461	38.7	
Majority		268	22.6	
Turnout		1,190	77.2	
Registered electors		1,541		
Independent hold		Swing		

=== Dodnash ===
Dodnash (2 seats)
Party	Candidate	Votes	%	±%
Independent	T. Goodchild*	Unopposed		
Independent	C. Wake-Walker*	Unopposed		
Registered electors		2,731		
Independent hold				
Independent hold				

=== Elmsett ===
Elmsett
Party	Candidate	Votes	%	±%
Independent	T. Bailey-Smith	Unopposed		
Registered electors		1,254		
Independent hold				

=== Glemsford ===
Glemsford (2 seats)
Party	Candidate	Votes	%	±%
Conservative	A. Goodwin*	826	59.9	
Conservative	P. Kiddy	680	49.3	
Labour	D. Chatters	553	40.1	
Turnout		~1,503	80.3	
Registered electors		1,718		
Conservative hold				
Conservative win (new seat)				

=== Great Cornard North ===
Great Cornard North (2 seats)
Party	Candidate	Votes	%	±%
Conservative	S. Byham*	806	52.4	
Labour	F. Harvey	732	47.6	
Labour	B. Niall	671	43.6	
Conservative	N. Scofield	624	40.5	
Turnout		~1,416	69.3	
Registered electors		2,219		
Conservative hold				
Labour hold				

=== Great Cornard South ===
Great Cornard South (2 seats)
Party	Candidate	Votes	%	±%
Conservative	A. Eady*	1,169	57.4	
Conservative	P. Beer	1,105	54.3	
Labour	R. Chaplin*	867	42.6	
Labour	C. Speroni	777	38.2	
Turnout		~2,273	73.4	
Registered electors		2,775		
Conservative hold				
Conservative gain from Labour				

=== Hadleigh ===
Hadleigh (3 seats)
Party	Candidate	Votes	%	±%
Independent	C. Claireaux	2,115	54.4	
Independent	J. Andrews	1,186	30.5	
Independent	S. Hogg	1,111	28.6	
Labour	C. Culpin	1,047	26.9	
Independent	P. Crabtree*	1,034	26.6	
Conservative	D. Anstruther	729	18.7	
Labour	M. Marshall	725	18.6	
Turnout		~3,887	91.2	
Registered electors		4,267		
Independent gain from Labour				
Independent hold				
Independent hold				

=== Holbrook ===
Holbrook
Party	Candidate	Votes	%	±%
Independent	J. Godley*	Unopposed		
Registered electors		1,364		
Independent hold				

=== Lavenham ===
Lavenham
Party	Candidate	Votes	%	±%
Liberal	L. Spraggins	618	57.5	
Conservative	W. Setchfield	456	42.5	
Majority		162	15.1	
Turnout		1,074	75.0	
Registered electors		1,432		
Liberal gain from Conservative		Swing		

=== Leavenheath ===
Leavenheath
Party	Candidate	Votes	%	±%
Independent	A. Boram	515	51.8	
Conservative	E. York*	480	48.2	
Majority		35	3.6	
Turnout		995	75.4	
Registered electors		1,319		
Independent gain from Conservative		Swing		

=== Long Melford ===
Long Melford (2 seats)
Party	Candidate	Votes	%	±%
Labour	R. Kemp*	Unopposed		
Residents	J. Abbott*	Unopposed		
Registered electors		2,710		
Labour gain from Liberal				
Residents hold				

=== Nayland ===
Nayland
Party	Candidate	Votes	%	±%
Conservative	J. Darbyshire	415	51.6	
Independent	D. Mitchell*	389	48.4	
Majority		26	3.2	
Turnout		804	85.6	
Registered electors		939		
Conservative gain from Independent		Swing		

=== North Cosford ===
North Cosford
Party	Candidate	Votes	%	±%
Independent	D. Hodge*	Unopposed		
Registered electors		1,167		
Independent hold				

=== Polstead & Layham ===
Polstead & Layham
Party	Candidate	Votes	%	±%
Conservative	A. Lloyd	567	71.3	
Independent	C. Edmunds	228	28.7	
Majority		339	42.6	
Turnout		795	78.6	
Registered electors		1,011		
Conservative hold		Swing		

=== Shotley ===
Shotley
Party	Candidate	Votes	%	±%
Conservative	T. Lloyd*	Unopposed		
Registered electors		1,187		
Conservative hold				

=== Sudbury East ===
Sudbury East (2 seats)
Party	Candidate	Votes	%
Labour	S. Gargiulo	874	51.4
Conservative	F. Matson	826	48.6
Conservative	A. Wicks	810	47.6
Labour	R. Tanner	807	47.5
Turnout		~1,700	65.7
Registered electors		2,587	
Labour win (new seat)			
Conservative win (new seat)			

=== Sudbury North ===
Sudbury North (2 seats)
Party	Candidate	Votes	%
Conservative	R. Playford*	1,075	55.1
Conservative	H. Singh*	935	47.9
Labour	P. Moulton	877	45.0
Labour	H. Banham	873	44.7
Turnout		~1,951	70.9
Registered electors		2,752	
Conservative win (new seat)			
Conservative win (new seat)			

=== Sudbury South ===
Sudbury South (2 seats)
Party	Candidate	Votes	%
Conservative	A. Moore*	712	39.5
Liberal	J. Hewitt	591	32.8
Conservative	G. Parker	587	32.6
Labour	E. Wiles	499	27.7
Turnout		~1,802	91.9
Registered electors		1,961	
Conservative win (new seat)			
Liberal win (new seat)			

=== Waldingfield ===
Waldingfield (2 seats)
Party	Candidate	Votes	%	±%
Conservative	C. Spence*	1,173	46.1	
Independent	A. Clarke	789	31.1	
Labour	D. King	580	22.8	
Labour	C. White	514	20.2	
Turnout		~2,541	103.6	
Registered electors		2,453		
Conservative hold				
Independent win (new seat)				

=== West Samford ===
West Samford
Party	Candidate	Votes	%	±%
Conservative	D. Wedgewood*	Unopposed		
Registered electors		1,233		
Conservative hold				
