= 1979 Welwyn Hatfield District Council election =

Welwyn Hatfield District Council election

- 3 May 1979

15 out of 43 seats to Welwyn Hatfield District Council 22 seats needed for a majority
- Turnout: 58,725, 82.6%

	First party	Second party	Third party
Party	Labour	Conservative	Liberal
Last election	20 seats, 46.9%	23 seats, 50.2%	0 seats, 2.9%
Seats before	20	23	0
Seats after	22	21	0
Seat change	▲2	▼2	Steady
Popular vote	26,447	30,138	2,140
Percentage	45.0%	51.3%	3.6%
Swing	▼1.9	▲1.1	▲0.7
- Council composition following the election.

The 1979 Welwyn Hatfield District Council election took place on 3 May 1979 to elect members of Welwyn Hatfield District Council in England. This was on the same day as the 1979 general election and other local elections. Due to this, the turnout for the council elections was unusually high at over 80% of the local population. A third of the council's seats were up for election.

At the election, the Labour Party regained control of the council that they had lost following the 1976 election despite their share of the popular vote falling. Their majority was the bare minimum needed however, but Labour would go on to increase it to a healthier amount in the next year's election.

== Summary ==
=== Election result ===
1979 Welwyn Hatfield District Council election
Party	This election			Full council			This election		
Party	Seats	Net	Seats %	Other	Total	Total %	Votes	Votes %	+/−
Labour	8	▲2	53.3	14	22	51.2	26,447	45.0	–1.9
Conservative	7	▼2	46.7	14	21	48.8	30,138	51.3	+1.1
Liberal	0	Steady	0.0	0	0	0.0	2,140	3.6	+0.7
