= 1979 Rochford District Council election =

1979 English local election

- 3 May 1979

14 out of 40 seats to Rochford District Council 21 seats needed for a majority

	First party	Second party	Third party
Party	Conservative	Residents	Independent
Seats won	9	1	2
Seats after	27	5	4
Seat change	Steady	▲1	▼1
Popular vote	14,801	1,201	1,875
Percentage	56.5%	4.6%	7.2%
Swing	▼4.3%	▼4.3%	N/A
	Fourth party	Fifth party
Party	Liberal	Labour
Seats won	2	0
Seats after	3	1
Seat change	▲1	▼1
Popular vote	4,013	4,298
Percentage	15.3%	16.4%
Swing	▲4.5%	▼3.2%
Council control before election
Conservative
Council control after election
Conservative

The 1979 Rochford District Council election took place on 3 May 1979 to elect members of Rochford District Council in Essex, England. This was on the same day as the 1979 general election and other local elections.

== Summary ==
=== Election result ===
1979 Rochford District Council election
Party	This election			Full council			This election		
Party	Seats	Net	Seats %	Other	Total	Total %	Votes	Votes %	+/−
Conservative	9	Steady	64.3	18	27	67.5	14,801	56.5	–4.3
Residents	1	▲1	7.1	4	5	12.5	1,201	4.6	–4.3
Independent	2	▼1	14.3	2	4	10.0	1,875	7.2	N/A
Liberal	2	▲1	14.3	1	3	7.5	4,013	15.3	+4.5
Labour	0	▼1	0.0	1	1	2.5	4,298	16.4	–3.2

== Ward results ==
Incumbent councillors standing for re-election are marked with an asterisk (*).

=== Ashingdon ===
Ashingdon
Party	Candidate	Votes	%	±%
Liberal	B. Crick*	909	55.6	+21.3
Conservative	E. Quincey	727	44.4	+7.2
Majority		182	11.1	N/A
Turnout		1,636	77.3	+35.5
Registered electors		2,151		
Liberal hold		Swing	▲7.1	

=== Barling & Sutton ===
Barling & Sutton
Party	Candidate	Votes	%	±%
Conservative	A. Chandler	Unopposed		
Registered electors		1,145		
Conservative hold				

=== Canewdon ===
Canewdon
Party	Candidate	Votes	%	±%
Independent	D. Wood*	812	64.9	–3.7
Conservative	P. Abrahams	439	35.1	+3.7
Majority		373	29.8	–7.4
Turnout		1,251	77.6	+32.2
Registered electors		1,626		
Independent hold		Swing	▼3.7	

=== Foulness & Great Wakering East ===
Foulness & Great Wakering East
Party	Candidate	Votes	%	±%
Conservative	R. Pearson	524	47.1	+18.4
Labour	W. Lay	306	27.5	–6.0
Independent	A. Humby*	283	25.4	–12.4
Majority		218	19.6	N/A
Turnout		1,113	79.2	+24.9
Registered electors		1,418		
Conservative gain from Independent		Swing	▲12.2	

=== Grange & Rawreth ===
Grange & Rawreth
Party	Candidate	Votes	%	±%
Conservative	E. Heath	1,696	65.2	+10.4
Labour	S. Andre	905	34.8	–10.4
Majority		791	30.4	+20.8
Turnout		2,601	75.1	+30.0
Registered electors		3,528		
Conservative hold		Swing	▲10.4	

=== Great Wakering Central ===
Great Wakering Central
Party	Candidate	Votes	%	±%
Conservative	F. Jopson	320	34.9	–5.3
Independent	E. Adcock	302	32.9	N/A
Labour	C. Bellman	295	32.2	–27.6
Majority		18	2.0	N/A
Turnout		917	82.2	+28.5
Registered electors		1,137		
Conservative gain from Labour				

=== Great Wakering West ===
Great Wakering West
Party	Candidate	Votes	%	±%
Independent	E. Adcock*	478	57.9	+8.0
Conservative	N. Keen	347	42.1	+14.3
Majority		131	15.9	–6.2
Turnout		825	80.1	+29.7
Registered electors		1,048		
Independent hold		Swing	▼3.2	

=== Hawkwell East ===
Hawkwell East
Party	Candidate	Votes	%	±%
Conservative	A. Harvey*	1,813	57.3	N/A
Liberal	G. Skinner	1,349	42.7	N/A
Majority		464	14.7	N/A
Turnout		3,162	77.3	N/A
Registered electors		4,140		
Conservative hold				

=== Hawkwell West ===
Hawkwell West
Party	Candidate	Votes	%	±%
Residents	R. Taylor	1,201	52.7	N/A
Conservative	R. Fawell*	1,080	47.3	–18.9
Majority		121	5.3	N/A
Turnout		2,281	81.3	+41.1
Registered electors		2,851		
Residents gain from Conservative				

=== Lodge ===
Lodge (2 seats due to by-election)
Party	Candidate	Votes	%	±%
Conservative	P. Cooke	2,338	67.4	–2.9
Conservative	P. Elliott	2,111	60.9	–9.4
Labour	W. Campbell	890	25.7	–4.0
Labour	D. Campbell	886	25.6	–4.1
Turnout		~3,467	78.2	+38.3
Registered electors		4,434		
Conservative hold				
Conservative hold				

=== Trinity ===
Trinity
Party	Candidate	Votes	%	±%
Liberal	D. Helson	1,252	56.2	–0.4
Conservative	D. Fowler*	804	36.1	–7.3
Labour	J. Clinkscales	173	7.8	N/A
Majority		448	20.1	+6.8
Turnout		2,229	85.1	+26.0
Registered electors		2,645		
Liberal gain from Conservative		Swing	▲3.5	

=== Wheatley ===
Wheatley
Party	Candidate	Votes	%	±%
Conservative	R. Holman*	1,153	60.8	–21.1
Liberal	J. Walsh	503	26.5	+8.4
Labour	V. Foley	241	12.7	N/A
Majority		650	34.4	–29.4
Turnout		1,897	80.4	+42.1
Registered electors		2,393		
Conservative hold		Swing	▼14.8	

=== Whitehouse ===
Whitehouse
Party	Candidate	Votes	%	±%
Conservative	J. Gibson	1,449	70.6	+14.6
Labour	G. Wade	602	29.4	+11.1
Majority		847	41.3	+11.0
Turnout		2,051	80.0	+29.7
Registered electors		2,600		
Conservative hold		Swing	▲1.8	
