= 1979 Guildford Borough Council election =

1979 UK local government election

The third Guildford Borough Council full-council elections were held on 3 May 1979, the same day as the General Election. The Conservatives retained control over the council winning 34 of the 45 seats. This represented a net loss of one seat from the 1976 elections. Labour retained all 6 councillors in its two strongholds Stoke and Westborough. The Liberals won 3 seats, a net gain of one seat from the 1976 elections. The Independents won 2 seats.

Measured from a party point of view, four wards changed hands partly or wholly in 1979, compared to the previous full-council elections in 1976. In two of those wards the councillors stayed the same but fought under a different party label. In Tongham a councillor who had been elected as an Independent Conservative in 1976 was reelected as a Conservative in 1979. The reverse occurred in Lovelace where a councillor who had been elected as a Conservative in 1976 was reelected as an Independent in 1979.

The Liberals lost their only seat in Holy Trinity ward to the Conservatives, but gained two of the three seats in Stoughton ward from the Conservatives.

== Results by ward ==
Ash (top 3 candidates elected)
| Party | Candidate | Votes | % | ±% |
|---|---|---|---|---|
| Conservative | JG Ades | 3157 | | |
| Conservative | Mrs RC Hall | 2957 | | |
| Conservative | RK Arnett | 2864 | | |
| Labour | Mrs J Curwell | 1849 | | |
| Labour | PD Green | 1669 | | |
| Labour | AR Roberts | 1627 | | |
| Majority | | 1015 | | |
| Conservative hold | | Swing | | |
| Conservative hold | | Swing | | |
| Conservative hold | | Swing | | |

Ash Vale (top 2 candidates elected)
| Party | Candidate | Votes | % | ±% |
|---|---|---|---|---|
| Conservative | Mrs JB Golding | 1830 | | |
| Conservative | Mrs MJ Lloyd-Jones | 1748 | | |
| Labour | ML Hawkins | 743 | | |
| Labour | BJK Thompson | 695 | | |
| Majority | | 1005 | | |
| Conservative hold | | Swing | | |
| Conservative hold | | Swing | | |

Christchurch (top 2 candidates elected)
| Party | Candidate | Votes | % | ±% |
|---|---|---|---|---|
| Conservative | J Twining | 2429 | | |
| Conservative | A Hodges | 2428 | | |
| Labour | Ms S Arber | 455 | | |
| Majority | | 1973 | | |
| Conservative hold | | Swing | | |
| Conservative hold | | Swing | | |

Clandon & Horsley (top 3 candidates elected)
| Party | Candidate | Votes | % | ±% |
|---|---|---|---|---|
| Conservative | M Whittingdale | 3448 | | |
| Conservative | G Greenhead | 3281 | | |
| Conservative | D May | 3237 | | |
| Liberal | F Oxford | 1760 | | |
| Labour | Ms D Dyer | 604 | | |
| Labour | H Richards | 523 | | |
| Majority | | 1477 | | |
| Conservative hold | | Swing | | |
| Conservative hold | | Swing | | |
| Conservative hold | | Swing | | |

Effingham (only 1 candidate elected)
| Party | Candidate | Votes | % | ±% |
|---|---|---|---|---|
| Conservative | P Tyrwhitt-Drake | 1075 | | |
| Liberal | P McCarthy | 338 | | |
| Labour | Miss F Lines | 157 | | |
| Majority | | 737 | | |
| Conservative hold | | Swing | | |

Friary & St. Nicolas (top 3 candidates elected)
| Party | Candidate | Votes | % | ±% |
|---|---|---|---|---|
| Liberal | RE Blundell | 1854 | | |
| Conservative | Mrs J Harris | 1775 | | |
| Conservative | DS Cobbet | 1736 | | |
| Conservative | SE Moss | 1592 | | |
| Liberal | RJ Marks | 1564 | | |
| Liberal | Mrs B O'Hara | 1438 | | |
| Labour | BK Chesterton | 731 | | |
| Labour | DG Hopkins | 687 | | |
| Labour | AF Daborn | 659 | | |
| Majority | | 144 | | |
| Liberal hold | | Swing | | |
| Conservative hold | | Swing | | |
| Conservative hold | | Swing | | |

Holy Trinity (top 2 candidates elected)
| Party | Candidate | Votes | % | ±% |
|---|---|---|---|---|
| Conservative | J Boyce | 1845 | | |
| Conservative | Mrs E Cobbett | 1693 | | |
| Liberal | G Maynard | 1197 | | |
| Liberal | D O'Donghue | 1049 | | |
| Labour | J Dale | 282 | | |
| Labour | Mrs J Daborn | 231 | | |
| Majority | | 496 | | |
| Conservative gain from Liberal | | Swing | | |
| Conservative hold | | Swing | | |

Lovelace (only 1 candidate elected)
| Party | Candidate | Votes | % | ±% |
|---|---|---|---|---|
| Independent | R Amis | 1040 | | |
| Independent | L Donoghue | 355 | | |
| Majority | | 685 | | |
| Independent gain from Conservative | | Swing | | |

Merrow & Burpham (top 3 candidates elected)
| Party | Candidate | Votes | % | ±% |
|---|---|---|---|---|
| Conservative | RHG Beatrip | 2694 | | |
| Conservative | SR Brearley | 2542 | | |
| Conservative | Mrs MO Uniacke | 2385 | | |
| Liberal | AR Dakers | 1340 | | |
| Liberal | CJ Oliver | 1320 | | |
| Labour | G Hall | 1088 | | |
| Labour | MP Hill | 1078 | | |
| Labour | MP Hornsby-Smith | 1066 | | |
| Majority | | 1045 | | |
| Conservative hold | | Swing | | |
| Conservative hold | | Swing | | |
| Conservative hold | | Swing | | |

Normandy (only 1 candidate elected)
| Party | Candidate | Votes | % | ±% |
|---|---|---|---|---|
| Conservative | AA Cook | 1080 | | |
| Labour | PJ Dyson | 647 | | |
| Majority | | 433 | | |
| Conservative hold | | Swing | | |

Onslow (top 3 candidates elected)
| Party | Candidate | Votes | % | ±% |
|---|---|---|---|---|
| Conservative | Mrs B Woodhatch | 1660 | | |
| Conservative | K Johns | 1625 | | |
| Conservative | B Parke | 1607 | | |
| Liberal | Mrs L Strudwick | 1049 | | |
| Liberal | S Hemelryk | 1010 | | |
| Liberal | K Borthwick | 1008 | | |
| Labour | J Cox | 844 | | |
| Labour | Mrs C Rogers | 805 | | |
| Labour | Mrs L Harper | 754 | | |
| Majority | | 558 | | |
| Conservative hold | | Swing | | |
| Conservative hold | | Swing | | |
| Conservative hold | | Swing | | |

Pilgrims (top 2 candidates elected)
| Party | Candidate | Votes | % | ±% |
|---|---|---|---|---|
| Conservative | JP Moore | 1668 | | |
| Conservative | MAHM Williamson | 1596 | | |
| Labour | Mrs JL Godward | 432 | | |
| Labour | GE Dinnage | 384 | | |
| Majority | | 1164 | | |
| Conservative hold | | Swing | | |
| Conservative hold | | Swing | | |

Pirbright (only 1 candidate elected)
| Party | Candidate | Votes | % | ±% |
|---|---|---|---|---|
| Conservative | Mrs CF Cobley | 819 | | |
| Labour | MC Yates | 214 | | |
| Majority | | 605 | | |
| Conservative hold | | Swing | | |

Send (top 2 candidates elected)
| Party | Candidate | Votes | % | ±% |
|---|---|---|---|---|
| Conservative | S Roberts | returned unopposed | | |
| Conservative | G Smith | returned unopposed | | |
| Conservative hold | | Swing | | |
| Conservative hold | | Swing | | |

Shalford (only 1 candidate elected)
| Party | Candidate | Votes | % | ±% |
|---|---|---|---|---|
| Conservative | Mrs ECS Stewart | 1067 | | |
| Independent | GA Goulty | 533 | | |
| Liberal | L Grugeon | 330 | | |
| Labour | GH Herrington | 304 | | |
| Majority | | 534 | | |
| Conservative hold | | Swing | | |

Stoke (top 3 candidates elected)
| Party | Candidate | Votes | % | ±% |
|---|---|---|---|---|
| Labour | GR Bellerby | 3062 | | |
| Labour | R Burgess | 2429 | | |
| Labour | Mrs E Pullan | 2263 | | |
| Conservative | R Gregory | 919 | | |
| Conservative | H Harris | 888 | | |
| Conservative | P Hooper | 762 | | |
| Liberal | Mrs M Goldstone | 649 | | |
| Majority | | 1344 | | |
| Labour hold | | Swing | | |
| Labour hold | | Swing | | |
| Labour hold | | Swing | | |

Stoughton (top 3 candidates elected)
| Party | Candidate | Votes | % | ±% |
|---|---|---|---|---|
| Liberal | CJ Fox | 1650 | | |
| Conservative | WR Jordan | 1595 | | |
| Liberal | Mrs S Holroyd | 1591 | | |
| Liberal | PJ Goldstone | 1542 | | |
| Conservative | LJ May | 1513 | | |
| Conservative | RE Price | 1441 | | |
| Labour | Mrs LA Dollery | 786 | | |
| Labour | PV Cole | 733 | | |
| Labour | C Pitt | 708 | | |
| Majority | | 49 | | |
| Liberal gain from Conservative | | Swing | | |
| Conservative hold | | Swing | | |
| Liberal gain from Conservative | | Swing | | |

Tillingbourne (top 2 candidates elected)
| Party | Candidate | Votes | % | ±% |
|---|---|---|---|---|
| Independent | Mrs MR Elston | 2084 | | |
| Conservative | Miss BA Pattman | 1915 | | |
| Liberal | TN Wills | 1288 | | |
| Majority | | 627 | | |
| Independent hold | | Swing | | |
| Conservative hold | | Swing | | |

Tongham (only 1 candidate elected)
| Party | Candidate | Votes | % | ±% |
|---|---|---|---|---|
| Conservative | PM Davies | 431 | | |
| Independent | AP Cross | 239 | | |
| Labour | WR Owen | 234 | | |
| | BHF Cobb | 107 | | |
| | RT Oliver | 68 | | |
| Majority | | 192 | | |
| Conservative gain from Independent | | Swing | | |

Westborough (top 3 candidates elected)
| Party | Candidate | Votes | % | ±% |
|---|---|---|---|---|
| Labour | Mrs D Bellerby | 2601 | | |
| Labour | J Dale | 2189 | | |
| Labour | J Patrick | 2141 | | |
| Conservative | G Scott | 1212 | | |
| Conservative | R Majoribanks | 1187 | | |
| Conservative | R Shorto | 1092 | | |
| Liberal | K Briggs | 868 | | |
| Liberal | J West | 685 | | |
| Liberal | Mrs D Nithsdale | 672 | | |
| Majority | | 929 | | |
| Labour hold | | Swing | | |
| Labour hold | | Swing | | |
| Labour hold | | Swing | | |

Worplesdon (top 3 candidates elected)
| Party | Candidate | Votes | % | ±% |
|---|---|---|---|---|
| Conservative | G Hellicar | 2615 | | |
| Conservative | F Ross-Symons | 2547 | | |
| Conservative | Ms C Griffin | 2222 | | |
| Liberal | P Stokoe | 1589 | | |
| Independent | H Cater | 1426 | | |
| Labour | Ms P Yates | 978 | | |
| Labour | R Shred | 893 | | |
| Majority | | 633 | | |
| Conservative hold | | Swing | | |
| Conservative hold | | Swing | | |
| Conservative hold | | Swing | | |
