= 1979 Wyre Borough Council election =

Election

- 3 May 1979

All 54 seats to Wyre Borough Council 28 seats needed for a majority

	First party	Second party	Third party
Party	Conservative	Labour	Liberal
Last election	48	0	2
Seats won	40	4	2
Seat change	▲3	▲4	=
	Fourth party
Party	Independent
Last election	4
Seats won	10
Seat change	▲6
Leader before election
Conservative
Leader after election
Conservative

The 1979 Wyre Borough Council election took place on 3 May 1979. This election was held on the same day as the 1979 United Kingdom general election.

== Election result ==
1979 Wyre Borough Council
Party	Candidates	Seats	Gains	Losses	Net gain/loss	Seats %	Votes %	Votes	+/−
Conservative		40	16	11	▲5				
Labour		4	4		▲4				
Liberal		2	0	0	=				
Independent		10	9	1	▲8				

== Ward results ==
=== Bailey ===
Bailey (3 seats)
Party	Candidate	Votes	%	±%
Labour	Hogston A.	926	33.9	
Independent	Vink A.	919	33.6	
Conservative	Clarke M. Ms.	890	32.5	
Conservative	Mitchell G.	865		
Independent	Cottam J.	854		
Conservative	Storey K.	787		
Independent	Harding M.	749		
Turnout		5,990	69.7	
Labour gain from Conservative				
Independent gain from Conservative				
Conservative hold				

=== Bourne ===
Bourne (3 seats)
Party	Candidate	Votes	%	±%
Conservative	Croft T.	1,625	42.8	
Labour	Goldsmith W.	1,502	39.6	
Conservative	Hoyle W.	1,323		
Conservative	Hough M. Ms.	1,224		
Liberal	Oldham J.	670	17.6	
Turnout		6,344	73.6	
Conservative win (new seat)				
Conservative win (new seat)				
Conservative win (new seat)				

=== Breck ===
Breck (2 seats)
Party	Candidate	Votes	%	±%
Conservative	Macgregor B.	1,068	46.3	
Conservative	Mellalieu E.	1,032		
Liberal	Penswick D.	706	30.6	
Labour	Maccallum R.	532	23.1	
Turnout		3,338	77.1	
Conservative hold				
Conservative hold				

=== Brock ===
Brock (1 seat)
Party	Candidate	Votes	%	±%
Conservative	Fox A.	676	70.8	
Liberal	Hall D.	279	29.2	
Turnout		955	78.0	
Conservative hold				

=== Calder ===
Calder (1 seat)
Party	Candidate	Votes	%	±%
Conservative	Ibison T.	598	68.7	
Liberal	Flood-Page J.	272	31.3	
Turnout		870	77.8	
Conservative hold				

=== Carleton ===
Carleton (2 seats)
Party	Candidate	Votes	%	±%
Conservative	Davis J.	1,673	57.7	
Independent	Morgan K.	1,228	42.3	
Conservative	Ward J.	1,214		
Independent	Elmore P.	821		
Turnout		4,936	83.6	
Conservative hold				
Independent win (new seat)				

=== Catterall ===
Catterall (1 seat)
Party	Candidate	Votes	%	±%
Conservative	Greenwood R.	812	70.0	
Liberal	Herbert P. Ms.	348	30.0	
Turnout		1,160	80.0	
Conservative hold				

=== Cleveleys Park ===
Cleveleys Park (3 seats)
Party	Candidate	Votes	%	±%
Conservative	Bootle J.	1,837	61.1	
Conservative	Collins K.	1,699		
Conservative	Winnard R.	1,693		
Labour	Wright G. Ms.	1,169	38.9	
Turnout		6,398	75.7	
Conservative win (new seat)				
Conservative win (new seat)				
Conservative win (new seat)				

=== Duchy ===
Duchy (1 seat)
Party	Candidate	Votes	%	±%
Conservative	Jackson J.	768	74.3	
Liberal	Sharp B.	266	25.7	
Turnout		1,034	73.3	
Conservative win (new seat)				

=== Garstang ===
Garstang (2 seats)
Party	Candidate	Votes	%	±%
Liberal	Herbert P.	1,404	47.3	
Conservative	Moreland F.	1,354	45.6	
Conservative	Alston J.	887		
Labour	Fleming A.	213	7.2	
Turnout		3,858	81.5	
Liberal hold				
Conservative hold				

=== Great Eccleston ===
Great Eccleston (1 seat)
Party	Candidate	Votes	%	±%
Conservative	Wild S.	707	47.8	
Independent	Anderton W.	592	40.0	
Independent	Magarry E.	181	12.2	
Turnout		1,480	77.5	
Conservative gain from Residents				

=== Hambleton ===
Hambleton (2 seats)
Party	Candidate	Votes	%	±%
Conservative	Williamson R.	1,481	55.3	
Conservative	Roper G.	1,221		
Liberal	Moat L. Ms.	1,198	44.7	
Turnout		3,900	73.8	
Conservative hold				
Conservative win (new seat)				

=== Hardhorn ===
Hardhorn (2 seats)
Party	Candidate	Votes	%	±%
Conservative	Stebbing C.	1,487	71.8	
Conservative	Bennett K.	1,473		
Liberal	Penswick C. Ms.	585	28.2	
Turnout		3,545	81.7	
Conservative hold				
Conservative hold				

=== High Cross ===
High Cross (2 seats)
Party	Candidate	Votes	%	±%
Conservative	Anderson L. Ms.	1,323	52.2	
Independent	Crampin D.	1,210	47.8	
Conservative	Robert A.	1,135		
Turnout		3,668	80.6	
Conservative hold				
Independent hold				

=== Jubilee ===
Jubilee (2 seats)
Party	Candidate	Votes	%	±%
Conservative	Townend F.	1,474	54.3	
Independent	Hibbert F.	1,242	45.7	
Conservative	Hodgkinson J.	912		
Turnout		3,628	70.9	
Conservative win (new seat)				
Independent win (new seat)				

=== Mount ===
Mount (2 seats)
Party	Candidate	Votes	%	±%
Independent	Baker H.	1,098	56.6	
Independent	Hooley D.	968		
Conservative	Barnes J.	843	43.4	
Conservative	Snape R.	838		
Turnout		3,747	66.5	
Independent gain from Conservative				
Independent gain from Conservative				

=== Norcross ===
Norcross (2 seats)
Party	Candidate	Votes	%	±%
Conservative	Ball W.	1,306	59.9	
Conservative	Goodier H.	1,198		
Liberal	Haworth P.	873	40.1	
Turnout		3,377	73.0	
Conservative win (new seat)				
Conservative win (new seat)				

=== Park ===
Park (3 seats)
Party	Candidate	Votes	%	±%
Labour	Aspden S.	1,449	42.6	
Independent	Turner R.	1,000	29.4	
Conservative	Howard T.	955	28.1	
Conservative	Vincent A.	920		
Conservative	Winnard K.	630		
Turnout		4,954	70.0	
Labour gain from Conservative				
Independent gain from Conservative				
Conservative hold				

=== Pharos ===
Pharos (2 seats)
Party	Candidate	Votes	%	±%
Conservative	Atkinson E. Ms.	930	39.4	
Labour	Fletcher T.	758	32.1	
Independent	Keighley R.	674	28.5	
Conservative	Waterhouse A.	638		
Labour	Ellis J.	591		
Turnout		3,591	71.5	
Conservative hold				
Labour gain from Conservative				

=== Pilling ===
Pilling (1 seat)
Party	Candidate	Votes	%	±%
Conservative	Hodgson E.	552	49.6	
Independent	Gardner C. Ms.	351	31.5	
Independent	Lawrenson W.	211	18.9	
Turnout		1,114	77.7	
Conservative hold				

=== Preesall ===
Preesall (3 seats)
Party	Candidate	Votes	%	±%
Conservative	Millward F.	Unopposed		
Conservative	Davies M.	Unopposed		
Conservative	Wrathall W.	Unopposed		
Turnout		0	0.0	
Conservative hold				
Conservative hold				
Conservative hold				

=== Rossall ===
Rossall (3 seats)
Party	Candidate	Votes	%	±%
Independent	Elliott G.	1,687	59.6	
Independent	Hewitt M.	1,660		
Independent	Riley V.	1,427		
Conservative	Oldfield M. Ms.	1,144	40.4	
Conservative	Timms D.	1,004		
Conservative	Turek T.	957		
Turnout		7,879	71.1	
Independent gain from Conservative				
Independent gain from Conservative				
Independent gain from Conservative				

=== Staina ===
Staina (3 seats)
Party	Candidate	Votes	%	±%
Conservative	Ashworth C.	2,117	59.4	
Conservative	Holt D.	1,928		
Conservative	Dickens T.	1,784		
Liberal	Rogers J. Ms.	1,448	40.6	
Turnout		7,277	77.1	
Conservative win (new seat)				
Conservative win (new seat)				
Conservative win (new seat)				

=== Tithebarn ===
Tithebarn (2 seats)
Party	Candidate	Votes	%	±%
Conservative	McHugh V.	1,316	71.5	
Conservative	Stephens J.	1,180		
Labour	Aspden B. Ms.	525	28.5	
Turnout		3,021	77.8	
Conservative gain from Independent				
Conservative hold				

=== Victoria ===
Victoria (3 seats)
Party	Candidate	Votes	%	±%
Conservative	Grime J.	1,840	60.4	
Conservative	Powell G.	1,479		
Conservative	Preston S. Ms.	1,335		
Liberal	Oldham V. Ms.	1,205	39.6	
Turnout		5,859	76.3	
Conservative hold				
Conservative hold				
Conservative hold				

=== Warren ===
Warren (3 seats)
Party	Candidate	Votes	%	±%
Conservative	Formstone H.	1,415	51.9	
Conservative	Bradbury B. Ms.	1,384		
Labour	Wareing D.	1,313	48.1	
Conservative	Keating T.	1,299		
Turnout		5,411	75.2	
Conservative hold				
Conservative hold				
Labour gain from Conservative				

=== Wyresdale ===
Wyresdale (1 seat)
Party	Candidate	Votes	%	±%
Liberal	Nicholson W.	617	58.5	
Conservative	Livesey W.	437	41.5	
Turnout		1,054	81.8	
Liberal hold				
