= 1979 Hyndburn Borough Council election =

1979 UK local government election

Following the merger of several Urban District Councils (Rishton, Gt Harwood, Accrington, Church, Oswaldtwsitle) and the Parish of Altham there followed ward boundary changes to equalise the seats. 1979 was the first election on the new boundaries with an all out election.

== Results ==
Hyndburn local election result 1979
Party	Seats	Gains	Losses	Net gain/loss	Seats %	Votes %	Votes	+/−
Labour	19	19			40.4%	46.6%	51,823	
Conservative	28	28			55.0%	49.1%	54,578	
Liberal						2.4%	2,724	
National Front						0.5%	593	
Independent						1.0%	1,067	
Communist						0.1%	87	
Spoilt						0.4%	392	
Totals	47					63.5%	111,264	

Ward	1979 3rd	1979 2nd	1979 1st
Next Up	1980	1981	1982
Altham Parish	Con	-	-
Barnfield	Con	Lab	Lab
Baxenden	Con	Con	Con
Central	Lab	Lab	Lab
Church	Lab	Lab	Lab
Clayton	Con	Con	Con
Huncoat	Con	Lab	Con
Immanuel	Lab	Con	Con
Milnshaw	Con	Con	Con
Netherton	Lab	Lab	Lab
Overton	Con	Con	Con
Peel	Lab	Lab	Con
Rishton Eachill	Con	-	Con
Rishton Norden	Con	Lab	-
Spring Hill	Lab	Lab	Lab
St Andrews	Con	Con	Con
St Oswalds	Con	Con	Con
Council (Lab)	5	8	6
Council (Con)	12	7	9

=== By ward ===
Altham Parish- electorate 1,073
Party	Candidate	Votes	%	±%
Conservative	F. Lowe	Uncontested		
Conservative hold		Swing		

Barnfield- electorate 3,013
Party	Candidate	Votes	%	±%
Labour	Ann Elizabeth Sudders			
Labour	Dave Walter Keeley			
Conservative	unknown			
National Front				
...	spoilt votes	16	...	
Majority				
Turnout			61.1%	
Conservative hold		Swing		
Labour hold		Swing		
Labour hold		Swing		

Baxenden- electorate 3,463
Party	Candidate	Votes	%	±%
Conservative	B Maudsley			
Conservative	Eddie Craig			
Conservative	unknown			
Liberal				
...	spoilt votes	22	...	
Majority				
Turnout			70.5%	
Conservative hold		Swing		
Conservative hold		Swing		
Conservative hold		Swing		

Central- electorate 4,144
Party	Candidate	Votes	%	±%
Labour	M Whitham			
Labour	Ken Curtis			
Labour	unknown			
Conservative				
National Front				
...	spoilt votes	41	...	
Majority				
Turnout			55.9%	
Labour hold		Swing		
Labour hold		Swing		
Labour hold		Swing		

Church- electorate 4,857
Party	Candidate	Votes	%	±%
Labour	Jack Grime			
Labour	Len Dickenson			
Labour	unknown			
Conservative				
National Front				
...	spoilt votes	22	...	
Majority				
Turnout			65.0%	
Labour hold		Swing		
Labour hold		Swing		
Labour hold		Swing		

Clayton-le-Moors - electorate 4,135
Party	Candidate	Votes	%	±%
Conservative	JS Arkwright			
Conservative	Jennie Jackson			
Conservative	unknown			
Labour				
...	spoilt votes	21	...	
Majority				
Turnout			68.7%	
Conservative hold		Swing		
Conservative hold		Swing		
Conservative hold		Swing		

Huncoat - electorate 2,772
Party	Candidate	Votes	%	±%
Conservative	Nigel Bramley Haworth			
Labour	Doris Grant			
Conservative	?			
Labour	?			
...	spoilt votes	16	...	
Majority				
Turnout			59.8%	
Conservative hold		Swing		
Conservative hold		Swing		
Labour hold		Swing		

Immanuel - electorate 3,351
Party	Candidate	Votes	%	±%
Conservative	M Barrett			
Conservative	Monica Margaret Browning			
Labour	unknown			
Conservative				
...	spoilt votes	41	...	
Majority				
Turnout			66.0%	
Conservative hold		Swing		
Conservative hold		Swing		
Labour hold		Swing		

Milnshaw - electorate 4,152
Party	Candidate	Votes	%	±%
Conservative	Raymond Duckworth			
Conservative	Herbert Taylor			
Conservative	Unknown			
Labour				
...	spoilt votes	33	...	
Majority				
Turnout			61.6%	
Conservative hold		Swing		
Conservative hold		Swing		
Conservative hold		Swing		

Netherton - electorate 3,709
Party	Candidate	Votes	%	±%
Labour	George Slynn			
Labour	Michael Hindley			
Labour	unknown			
Conservative				
...	spoilt votes	19	...	
Majority				
Turnout			72.5	
Labour hold		Swing		
Labour hold		Swing		
Labour hold		Swing		

Overton - electorate 4,519
Party	Candidate	Votes	%	±%
Conservative	Jessie Marie Hall			
Conservative	William Birch Sumner			
Conservative	unknown			
Labour				
...	spoilt votes	34	...	
Majority				
Turnout			70.2	
Conservative hold		Swing		
Conservative hold		Swing		
Conservative hold		Swing		

Peel - electorate 3,996
Party	Candidate	Votes	%	±%
Labour	Bernard Dawson			
Labour	John Culshaw			
Conservative	Alice Owens			
Labour				
...	spoilt votes	47	...	
Majority				
Turnout			62.3%	
Labour hold		Swing		
Labour hold		Swing		
Conservative hold		Swing		

Rishton Eachill - electorate 2,090
Party	Candidate	Votes	%	±%
Conservative	Donald John McNeil			
Conservative	unknown			
Labour				
Liberal				
...	spoilt votes	14	...	
Majority				
Turnout			49.8%	
Conservative hold		Swing		
Conservative hold		Swing		

Rishton Norden- electorate 2,574
Party	Candidate	Votes	%	±%
Labour	Alan Critchlow			
Conservative	unknown			
Labour				
Conservative				
...	spoilt votes	17	...	
Majority				
Turnout			49.8%	
Labour hold		Swing		
Conservative hold		Swing		

Spring Hill - electorate 4,131
Party	Candidate	Votes	%	±%
Labour	Christopher Dillon			
Labour	D McGrath			
Labour	Unknown			
Conservative				
Liberal				
Communist				
Independent				
...	spoilt votes	24	...	
Majority				
Turnout			56.9%	
Labour hold		Swing		
Labour hold		Swing		
Labour hold		Swing		

St. Andrew's - electorate 3,239
Party	Candidate	Votes	%	±%
Conservative	J K Hargreaves			
Conservative	Clifford Walsh'			
Conservative	unknown			
Labour				
...	spoilt votes	9	...	
Majority				
Turnout			65.5%	
Conservative hold		Swing		
Conservative hold		Swing		
Conservative hold		Swing		

St Oswald's - electorate 4,085
Party	Candidate	Votes	%	±%
Conservative	Edward (Ted) Francis Hill			
Conservative	Thomas Wilfred Renshaw			
Conservative	unknown			
Labour				
...	spoilt votes	16	...	
Majority				
Turnout			68.7%	
Conservative hold		Swing		
Conservative hold		Swing		
Conservative hold		Swing		
