= Welwyn Hatfield Borough Council elections =

Local government elections in Hertfordshire, England

One third of Welwyn Hatfield Borough Council in Hertfordshire, England is elected each year, followed by one year without election. Since the last boundary changes in 2016 the council has comprised 48 councillors representing 16 wards, each of which elects three councillors.

== Council elections ==
Composition of the council
Year	Conservative	Labour	Liberal Democrats (Note: Includes totals for the predecessors of the Liberal Democrats, the Liberal Party and SDP (both of which participated in the Alliance).)	Reform	Independents & Others	Council control after election
Local government reorganisation; council established (43 seats)
1973	19	24	0	-	0	Labour
New ward boundaries (43 seats)
1976	24	19	0	-	0	Conservative
1978	23	20	0	-	0	Conservative
1979	21	22	0	-	0	Labour
1980	18	25	0	-	0	Labour
1982	18	25	0	-	0	Labour
1983	19	24	0	-	0	Labour
1984	19	24	0	-	0	Labour
1986	17	24	2	-	0	Labour
1987	18	23	2	-	0	Labour
1988	19	22	2	-	0	Labour
1990	19	24	0	-	0	Labour
New ward boundaries (47 seats)
1991	21	26	0	-	0	Labour
1992	24	23	0	-	0	Conservative
1994	23	24	0	-	0	Labour
1995	20	27	0	-	0	Labour
1996	16	31	0	-	0	Labour
1998	20	27	0	-	0	Labour
New ward boundaries (48 seats)
1999	24	21	0	-	0 (Note: Including 3 vacant seats)	No overall control
2000	23	25	0	-	0	Labour
2002	26	22	0	-	0	Conservative
2003	27	21	0	-	0	Conservative
2004	31	15	2	-	0	Conservative
2006	32	12	3	-	1	Conservative
2007	35	10	3	-	0	Conservative
New ward boundaries (48 seats)
2008	40	5	3	-	0	Conservative
2010	40	5	3	-	0	Conservative
2011	37	9	2	-	0	Conservative
2012	34	11	2	-	1	Conservative
2014	31	14	2	-	1	Conservative
2015	31	14	2	-	1	Conservative
New ward boundaries (48 seats)
2016	28	15	5	-	0	Conservative
2018	28	15	8	-	0	Conservative
2019	23	13	12	-	0	No overall control
2021	28	9	11	0	0	Conservative
2022	26	10	12	0	0	Conservative
2023	22	12	14	0	0	No overall control
2024	12	20	16	0	0	No overall control
2026	12	16	15	3	2	No overall control

== Results maps ==
2002 results map

2003 results map

2004 results map

2006 results map

2007 results map

2008 results map

2010 results map

2011 results map

2012 results map

2014 results map

2015 results map

2016 results map

2018 results map

2019 results map

2021 results map

2022 results map

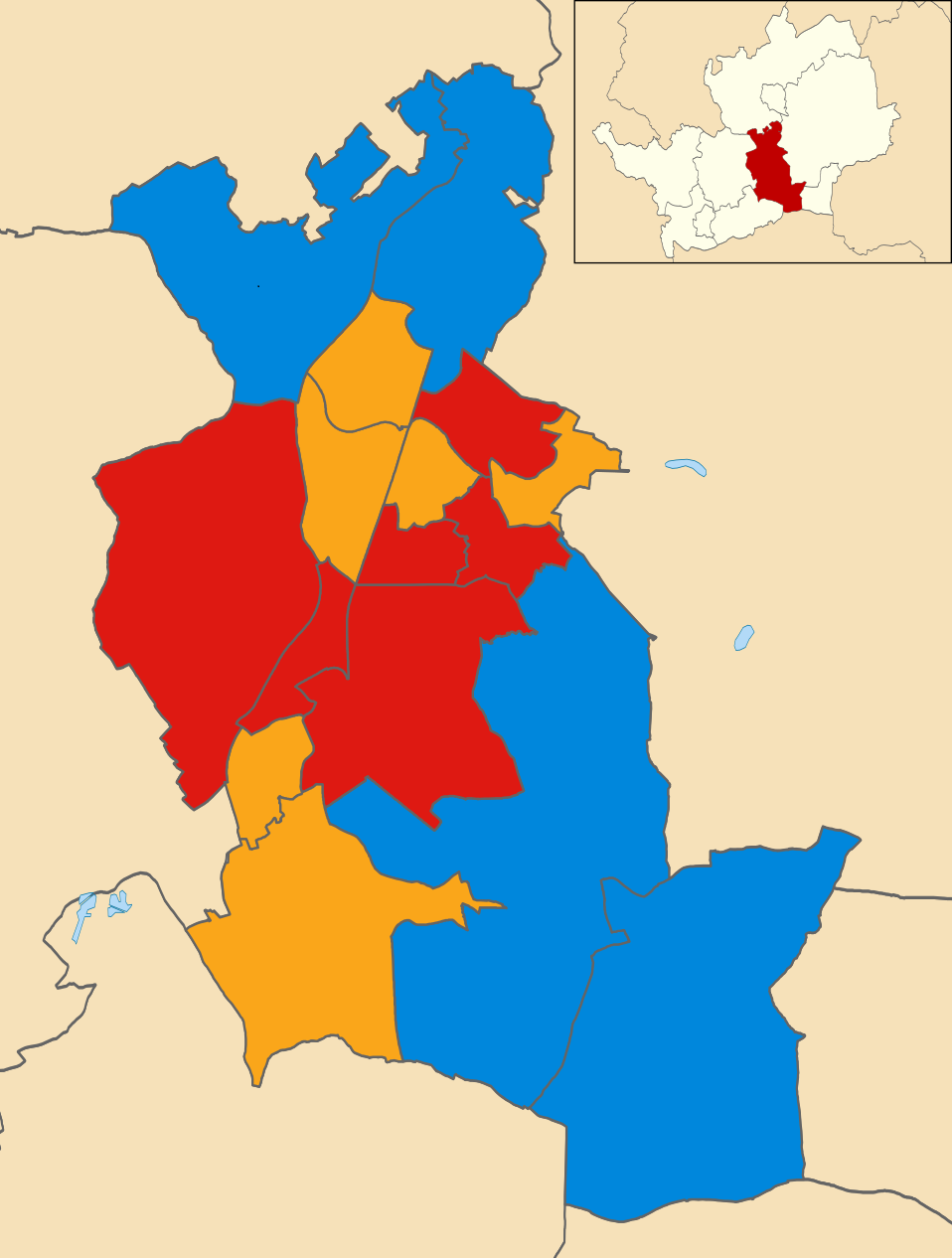
2023 results map

2024 results map

2026 results map

== By-election results ==
=== 1994–1998 ===
Panshanger By-Election 10 July 1997
Party	Candidate	Votes	%	±%
Conservative		486	49.5	+10.4
Labour		292	29.8	−22.4
Liberal Democrats		109	11.1	+2.4
No to Sleaze, No to Slough		94	9.6	+9.6
Majority		194	19.7	
Turnout		981	25.0	
Conservative gain from Labour		Swing		

Hatfield North By-Election 7 August 1997
Party	Candidate	Votes	%	±%
Conservative		517	42.9	+21.0
Labour		454	37.7	−28.2
Liberal Democrats		156	13.0	+0.7
Other		77	6.4	+6.4
Majority		63	5.2	
Turnout		1,204		
Conservative gain from Labour		Swing		

=== 1998–2002 ===
Hollybush By-Election 25 June 1998
Party	Candidate	Votes	%	±%
Labour		726	75.0	+8.3
Conservative		241	24.9	+4.7
Majority		485	50.1	
Turnout		967	23.0	
Labour hold		Swing		

Peartree By-Election 25 June 1998
Party	Candidate	Votes	%	±%
Labour		528	83.7	+15.4
Conservative		103	16.3	−1.2
Majority		425	67.4	
Turnout		631	13.0	
Labour hold		Swing		

Hollybush By-Election 17 June 1999 (3)
Party	Candidate	Votes	%	±%
Labour		802		
Labour		797		
Labour		772		
Conservative		282		
Conservative		282		
Conservative		272		
Liberal Democrats		82		
Liberal Democrats		81		
Liberal Democrats		69		
Turnout		3,439	29.0	
Labour hold		Swing		
Labour hold		Swing		
Labour hold		Swing		

Handside By-Election 31 August 2000
Party	Candidate	Votes	%	±%
Conservative		831	51.6	
Labour		381	23.7	
Liberal Democrats		276	17.2	
UKIP		121	7.5	
Majority		450	27.9	
Turnout		1,609	30.1	
Conservative hold		Swing		

Haldens By-Election 8 November 2001
Party	Candidate	Votes	%	±%
Labour		611	58.8	+1.7
Conservative		363	34.9	+4.4
Liberal Democrats		65	6.3	−6.2
Majority		248	23.9	
Turnout		1,039	22.7	
Labour hold		Swing		

=== 2002–2006 ===
Hatfield North By-Election 19 June 2003
Party	Candidate	Votes	%	±%
Conservative	Howard Morgan	539	50.7	+7.9
Labour		398	37.4	−4.9
Liberal Democrats		126	11.9	−3.0
Majority		141	13.3	
Turnout		1,063	24.7	
Conservative gain from Labour		Swing		

Hatfield North By-Election 27 November 2003
Party	Candidate	Votes	%	±%
Conservative	Clare Berry	484	46.8	−3.9
Labour	Stuart Jackson	444	42.9	+5.5
Liberal Democrats	Mike Larkins	106	10.3	−1.6
Majority		40	3.9	
Turnout		1,034	23.8	
Conservative hold		Swing		

Sherrards By-Election 27 November 2003
Party	Candidate	Votes	%	±%
Conservative	Christine Wheeler	689	46.0	+0.4
Labour	Christopher Cory	521	34.8	−5.1
Liberal Democrats	Ian Skidmore	288	19.2	+4.8
Majority		168	11.2	
Turnout		1,498	34.6	
Conservative hold		Swing		

Haldens By-Election 30 June 2005
Party	Candidate	Votes	%	±%
Labour	Samuel Smith	546	38.2	−0.2
Conservative	Sara Johnston	456	32.0	−2.8
Liberal Democrats	Eirwen Smith	425	29.8	+3.0
Majority		90	6.2	
Turnout		1,427	32.8	
Labour hold		Swing		

Handside By-Election 30 June 2005
Party	Candidate	Votes	%	±%
Liberal Democrats	Anthony Skottowe	1,124	56.5	+11.0
Conservative	Lance Stanbury	702	35.2	−8.4
Labour	Sarah Carthew	165	8.3	−2.6
Majority		422	21.3	
Turnout		1,498	40.1	
Liberal Democrats hold		Swing		

=== 2006–2010 ===
Welham Green By-Election 3 January 2008
Party	Candidate	Votes	%	±%
Conservative	Doug Berry	539	40.7	
Liberal Democrats	John Elvy	484	36.5	
BNP	Mark Fuller	214	16.2	
Labour	Bridgit Croft	88	6.6	
Majority		55	4.2	
Turnout		1,325	46.6	
Conservative hold		Swing		

Hatfield Central By-Election 26 June 2008
Party	Candidate	Votes	%	±%
Labour	Maureen Cook	425	33.2	−8.3
Liberal Democrats	Hazel Laming	329	25.7	+10.5
Conservative	Stan Laver-Walton	319	24.9	−18.4
BNP	Mark Fuller	138	10.8	+10.8
Independent	Timothy Butler	69	5.4	+5.4
Majority		96	7.5	
Turnout		1,280	28.5	
Labour gain from Conservative		Swing		

Hatfield East By-Election 4 June 2009
Party	Candidate	Votes	%	±%
Conservative	Tony Kingsbury	954	50.1	−6.2
Liberal Democrats	Hazel Laming	579	30.4	+9.4
Labour	Cathy Watson	370	19.4	−3.2
Majority		375	19.7	
Turnout		1,903	40.4	
Conservative hold		Swing		

Hatfield South By-Election 4 June 2009
Party	Candidate	Votes	%	±%
Labour	Kieran Thorpe	431	38.0	
Conservative	Sarah Langley	413	36.4	
Liberal Democrats	Simon Archer	291	25.6	
Majority		18	1.6	
Turnout		1,135	32.2	
Labour hold		Swing		

=== 2010–2014 ===
Haldens By-Election 2 May 2013
Party	Candidate	Votes	%	±%
Labour	Tony Crump	580	39.1	−10.8
Conservative	Madeleine Sawle	458	30.8	−4.2
UKIP	Kevin Daley	277	18.7	+18.7
Green	Susan Groom	104	7.0	−2.5
Liberal Democrats	Frank Marsh	66	4.4	−1.2
Majority		122	8.2	
Turnout		1,485		
Labour hold		Swing		

=== 2014–2018 ===
Haldens By-Election 17 November 2016
Party	Candidate	Votes	%	±%
Conservative	Nathaniel Chapman	502	34.1	−1.3
Labour	Astrid Thorpe	454	30.8	−6.9
Liberal Democrats	Anthony Dennis	437	29.6	+17.7
Green	Lynne Allison	81	5.5	−9.5
Majority		48	3.3	
Turnout		1,474		
Conservative hold		Swing		

Panshanger By-Election 4 May 2017
Party	Candidate	Votes	%	±%
Conservative	Terry Mitchinson	643	38.3	−7.5
Liberal Democrats	Ayesha Rohale	620	36.9	+21.4
Labour	Lucy Musk	418	24.9	+2.6
Majority		23	1.4	
Turnout		1,681		
Conservative hold		Swing		

Hatfield Villages By-Election 8 June 2017
Party	Candidate	Votes	%	±%
Labour	Tara-Mary Lyons	1,359	40.1	+2.2
Conservative	Peter Hebden	1,352	39.9	−10.0
Liberal Democrats	Jane Quinton	677	20.0	+7.8
Majority		7	0.2	
Turnout		3,388		
Labour gain from Conservative		Swing		

Handside By-Election 14 December 2017
Party	Candidate	Votes	%	±%
Liberal Democrats	Siobhan Elam	1105	52.4	+16.7
Conservative	Drew Richardson	691	32.8	−9.3
Labour	Belinda Yeldon	260	12.3	−3.5
Majority		375	19.7	
Turnout		2,111	38.5	
Liberal Democrats hold		Swing		

=== 2018–2022 ===
Hatfield Central By-Election 7 July 2022
Party	Candidate	Votes	%	±%
Labour	Kieran Thorpe	599	53.7	+0.9
Conservative	Mark Smith	273	24.5	−8.9
Liberal Democrats	Richard Griffiths	183	16.4	+2.6
Abolish the TV Licence Party	Melvyn Jones	61	5.5	+5.5
Majority		326	29.2	
Turnout		1,116		
Labour hold		Swing		

=== 2022–2026 ===
Held alongside the 2025 Hertfordshire County Council election.

Brookmans Park and Little Heath by-election: 1 May 2025
Party	Candidate	Votes	%	±%
Conservative	Fiona Thomson	813	45.9	–13.0
Reform	Michael Southwell	521	29.4	+22.6
Labour	Graham Beevers	223	12.6	–8.7
Liberal Democrats	Anthony Green	134	7.6	–0.2
Green	William Berrington	82	4.6	–0.6
Majority		292	16.5	–21.1
Turnout		1,773	36.6	+1.0
Registered electors		5,028		
Conservative hold				

Peartree by-election: 1 May 2025
Party	Candidate	Votes	%	±%
Liberal Democrats	Fauzia Haider	420	34.2	–9.1
Reform	Mark Biddle	375	30.5	New
Labour	Sarah Ellingworth	243	19.8	–16.5
Conservative	Jeet Dhelaria	98	8.0	–4.2
Green	Tanya Dickson	91	7.4	–0.8
Majority		45	3.7	–3.3
Turnout		1,227	31.3	+5.2
Registered electors		5,580		
Liberal Democrats hold				
