= Welwyn (disambiguation) =

Welwyn is a village and civil parish in Hertfordshire, England.

Welwyn may also relate to:

Places

- Welwyn

- Welwyn North railway station

- Welwyn Tunnel rail crash

- Welwyn RFC, a rugby football club
- Welwyn Roman Baths, an archaeological site

- Welwyn Garden City, a town within the Borough of Welwyn Hatfield in Hertfordshire, England

- Welwyn Garden City F.C., a football club
- Welwyn Garden City Hockey Club
- Welwyn Garden City railway station

- Welwyn Garden City rail crashes

- Borough of Welwyn Hatfield, a local government district in Hertfordshire, England

- Grade II* listed buildings in Welwyn Hatfield
- Welwyn Hatfield Borough Council

- Welwyn Hatfield Borough Council elections

- Welwyn Hatfield District Council election, 1998
- Welwyn Hatfield District Council election, 1999
- Welwyn Hatfield District Council election, 2000
- Welwyn Hatfield District Council election, 2002
- Welwyn Hatfield District Council election, 2003
- Welwyn Hatfield District Council election, 2004
- Welwyn Hatfield District Council election, 2006
- Welwyn Hatfield Borough Council election, 2007
- Welwyn Hatfield Borough Council election, 2008
- Welwyn Hatfield Borough Council election, 2012
- Welwyn Hatfield Borough Council elections 2012
- Welwyn Hatfield Borough Council election, 2014

- Welwyn Hatfield (UK Parliament constituency), in Hertfordshire, England
- Welwyn Preserve, a nature reserve in New York State
- Welwyn, Saskatchewan, a community in Canada

Other

- Welwyn Studios, a film studio located in Welwyn Garden City 1928–50
- Welwyn Tool Group, a tool distribution company based in Welwyn Garden City
