= 2019 Welwyn Hatfield Borough Council election =

2019 UK local government election

← 2018	2 May 2019	2021 →

18 out of 48 seats to Welwyn Hatfield Borough Council 25 seats needed for a majority

	First party	Second party	Third party
Party	Conservative	Labour	Liberal Democrats
Last election	25	15	8
Seats before	25	15	8
Seats won	8	5	5
Seats after	23	13	12
Seat change	▼2	▼2	▲4
Popular vote	11,341	7,419	9,397
Percentage	38.8%	25.4%	32.2%
Swing	▼2.5%	▼3.5%	▲7.8%
- Winner of each seat at the 2019 Welwyn Hatfield Borough Council election.

Elections to Welwyn Hatfield Borough Council took place on 2 May 2019. This was on the same day as other local elections across the United Kingdom. Following the trend of the elections across the UK, the Liberal Democrats made significant gains in the popular vote at the cost of the Conservative Party and Labour. This resulted in the Liberal Democrats gaining two seats from both other parties; enough to cause the Conservatives to lose control of the council for the first time in seventeen years. The period of no overall control would not last long however, with the Conservatives regaining control at the next local election.

== Results summary ==
2019 Welwyn Hatfield Borough Council election
Party	This election			Full council			This election		
Party	Seats	Net	Seats %	Other	Total	Total %	Votes	Votes %	+/−
Conservative	8	▼2	44.4	15	23	47.9	11,341	38.8	▼2.5
Labour	5	▼2	27.8	8	13	27.1	7,419	25.4	▼3.5
Liberal Democrats	5	▲4	27.8	7	12	25.0	9,397	32.2	▲7.8
Green	0	Steady	0.0	0	0	0.0	733	2.5	New
UKIP	0	Steady	0.0	0	0	0.0	303	1.0	New

== Ward results ==
=== Brookmans Park and Little Heath ===
Brookmans Park and Little Heath
Party	Candidate	Votes	%	±%
Conservative	Jonathan Stephen Findlay Boulton	1,253	67.8	▼7.4
Liberal Democrats	Louisa Beth Noel	376	20.4	▲9.1
Labour	Graham Martyn Beevers	218	11.8	▼1.8
Majority		877	47.4	—
Turnout		1,878	37.5	—
Conservative hold		Swing		

=== Haldens ===
Haldens
Party	Candidate	Votes	%	±%
Conservative	Barbara Ann Fitzsimmon	568	35.8	▲2.3
Labour	Jason Lee Robinson	514	32.4	▼2.3
Liberal Democrats	Darrell Rodney Panter	341	21.5	▼10.3
Green	Berenice Constance Mary Dowlen	164	10.3	New
Majority		54	3.4	—
Turnout		1,612	32.4	—
Conservative hold		Swing		

=== Handside ===
Handside
Party	Candidate	Votes	%	±%
Liberal Democrats	Anthony Dennis	1,488	58.7	▲2.6
Conservative	Chieme Okuzu	667	26.3	▼7.1
Labour	Martin Paul Norman	202	8.0	▼2.5
Green	Ian Nicholas Challoner Nendick	178	7.0	New
Majority		821	32.4	—
Turnout		2,561	46.8	—
Liberal Democrats gain from Conservative		Swing		

=== Hatfield Central ===
Hatfield Central
Party	Candidate	Votes	%	±%
Labour	Glyn Charles Hayes	582	45.1	▼8.6
Conservative	James Bond	435	33.7	▲2.0
Liberal Democrats	Adam Edwards	274	21.2	▲6.6
Majority		147	11.4	—
Turnout		1,315	24.3	—
Labour hold		Swing		

=== Hatfield East ===
Hatfield East
Party	Candidate	Votes	%	±%
Conservative	Caron Anne Juggins	623	35.4	▼7.4
Conservative	Edward Frederick Findlay Boulton	584	33.2	▼9.5
Liberal Democrats	Jackie Brennan	553	31.4	▲10.9
Labour	Phil Knott	524	29.8	▼6.9
Liberal Democrats	Gemma May Louise Moore	467	26.5	▲6.0
Labour	Cathy Watson	450	25.6	▼11.6
Green	Ian Howard Gregory	157	8.9	New
Majority		31	3.7	—
Turnout		1,829	33.2	—
Conservative hold		Swing		
Conservative hold		Swing		

=== Hatfield South West ===
Hatfield South West
Party	Candidate	Votes	%	±%
Labour	Lenny Brandon	629	45.7	▼0.6
Labour	James Robert Alan Broach	544	39.6	▼7.4
Liberal Democrats	Simon John Archer	370	26.9	▲13.5
Conservative	Jack Adams	341	24.8	▼1.3
Liberal Democrats	Paul Graham Wilson	322	23.4	▲10.0
Conservative	Aaron Steven Edward Jacob	295	21.5	▼4.6
Majority		174	19.3	—
Turnout		1,404	27.9	—
Labour hold		Swing		
Labour hold		Swing		

=== Hatfield Villages ===
Hatfield Villages
Party	Candidate	Votes	%	±%
Conservative	Drew Robert Richardson	654	45.3	▼0.7
Labour	Margaret Anne Eames-Peterses	573	39.7	▲2.7
Liberal Democrats	Matthew John Quenet	218	15.1	▲0.9
Majority		71	5.6	—
Turnout		1,467	27.2	—
Conservative hold		Swing		

=== Hollybush ===
Hollybush
Party	Candidate	Votes	%	±%
Labour	Margaret Birleson	620	47.9	▼5.5
Conservative	Anthony James Musk	492	38.0	▲3.1
Liberal Democrats	Chris Corbey-West	183	14.1	▲6.5
Majority		128	9.9	—
Turnout		1,330	27.2	—
Labour hold		Swing		

=== Howlands ===
Howlands
Party	Candidate	Votes	%	±%
Labour	Jill Weston	696	43.4	▼8.8
Conservative	Stan Tunstall	523	32.6	▼5.7
UKIP	Darren Hughes	193	12.0	New
Liberal Democrats	Konrad Basch	191	11.9	▲2.4
Majority		173	10.8	—
Turnout		1,618	30.8	—
Labour hold		Swing		

=== Northaw and Cuffley ===
Northaw and Cuffley
Party	Candidate	Votes	%	±%
Conservative	George Michaelides	1,012	68.5	▼2.0
Liberal Democrats	Robina Helen Durrant	335	22.7	▲3.1
Labour	Sheila Ann Barrett	131	9.9	▼2.6
Majority		677	45.8	—
Turnout		1,502	31.8	—
Conservative hold		Swing	—	

=== Panshanger ===
Panshanger
Party	Candidate	Votes	%	±%
Liberal Democrats	Jane Quinton	784	48.8	▲11.3
Conservative	Iain Grady Mansfield	587	36.5	▲1.3
Labour	Kyle Anthony MacLeod	237	14.7	▼8.2
Majority		197	12.3	—
Turnout		1,629	36.5	—
Liberal Democrats gain from Conservative		Swing		

=== Peartree ===
Peartree
Party	Candidate	Votes	%	±%
Liberal Democrats	Jayne Lesley Ranshaw	623	50.4	▲6.4
Labour	Steve Roberts	402	32.6	▼6.1
Conservative	Tony Bailey	210	17.0	▼0.3
Majority		221	17.8	—
Turnout		1,258	26.1	—
Liberal Democrats gain from Labour		Swing		

=== Sherrards ===
Sherrards
Party	Candidate	Votes	%	±%
Liberal Democrats	Frank Annibale Stefano Marchio Marsh	921	46.5	▲7.8
Conservative	Pat Mabbott	595	30.1	▼3.2
Labour	Hilary Louise Carlen	245	12.4	▼11.6
UKIP	Paul Joseph Naughton	110	5.6	New
Green	Lesley Jean Smith	108	5.5	New
Majority		326	16.4	—
Turnout		1,986	44.2	—
Liberal Democrats gain from Conservative		Swing		

=== Welham Green and Hatfield South ===
Welham Green and Hatfield South
Party	Candidate	Votes	%	±%
Liberal Democrats	Jaida Esin Caliskan	883	47.0	▲7.9
Conservative	Darren Malcolm Bennett	599	31.9	▼2.0
Labour	John Richard Eames-Petersen	393	21.0	▲0.4
Majority		284	15.1	—
Turnout		1,623	30.5	—
Liberal Democrats hold		Swing		

=== Welwyn East ===
Welwyn East
Party	Candidate	Votes	%	±%
Conservative	Roger Trigg	905	51.4	▲3.6
Liberal Democrats	Helen Harrington	511	29.0	▲17.9
Labour	Josh Chigwangwa	343	19.5	▼8.6
Majority		394	22.4	—
Turnout		1,801	35.5	—
Conservative hold		Swing		

=== Welwyn West ===
Welwyn West
Party	Candidate	Votes	%	±%
Conservative	Tony Kingsbury	998	55.5	▲3.6
Liberal Democrats	Christina Maria Raven	557	31.0	New
Green	Tim Hogan	126	7.0	New
Labour	Ian Merison	116	6.5	▼2.9
Majority		213	14.5	—
Turnout		1,812	37.2	—
Conservative hold		Swing	▲4.4	
