= 2016 Welwyn Hatfield Borough Council election =

2016 UK local government election

← 2015	5 May 2016	2018 →

48 out of 48 seats to Welwyn Hatfield Borough Council 25 seats needed for a majority

	First party	Second party	Third party
Party	Conservative	Labour	Liberal Democrats
Seats before	31	14	2
Seats won	28	15	5
Seat change	▼3	▲1	▲3
Popular vote	32,324	20,446	13,284
Percentage	45.3%	28.7%	18.6%
- Winner of each seat at the 2016 Welwyn Hatfield Borough election
Council control before election
Conservative
Council control after election
Conservative

The 2016 Welwyn Hatfield Borough Council election took place on 5 May 2016 to elect members of Welwyn Hatfield Borough Council in England. This was on the same day as other local elections. All seats were up for election following boundary changes that came into effect that year. Despite a relatively minor drop in their share of the popular vote, the boundary changes resulted in the Conservatives losing several seats on the council, although they still maintained majority control.

== Results summary ==
Welwyn Hatfield Borough Council election, 2016
Party	Seats	Gains	Losses	Net gain/loss	Seats %	Votes %	Votes	+/−
Conservative	28	0	5	▼5		45.3	32,324	-0.8
Labour	15	1	0	▲1		28.7	20,446	+5.0
Liberal Democrats	5	3	0	▲3		18.6	13,284	+7.5
Green	0	0	0	Steady		3.3	2,338	-3.0
UKIP	0	0	0	Steady		2.1	1,486	-9.5
Independent	0	0	1	▼1		2.0	1,403	+0.8

== Ward results ==
=== Brookmans Park and Little Heath ===
Brookmans Park and Little Heath
Party	Candidate	Votes	%	±%
Conservative	Stephen John Boulton	1,319	71.1	
Conservative	Jonathan Stephen Findlay Boulton	1,275	—	
Conservative	John William Dean	1,265	—	
Liberal Democrats	Michael Anscombe	278	15.0	
Liberal Democrats	Jenny Blumsom	261	—	
Labour	Peter John Costello	257	13.9	
Labour	James Robert Dolan	233	—	
Labour	John Richard Eames-Peterson	221	—	
Liberal Democrats	Nigel Anthony van Someren Bain	202	—	
Turnout		—	37.6	
Conservative win (new seat)				
Conservative win (new seat)				
Conservative win (new seat)				

=== Haldens ===
Haldens
Party	Candidate	Votes	%	±%
Labour	Mike Larkins	782	37.7	
Conservative	Barbara Ann Fitzsimmon	734	35.4	
Conservative	Malcolm Robert Spinks	666	—	
Labour	Lucy Musk	655	—	
Conservative	Peter Hebden	622	—	
Labour	Tara Mary Lyons	571	—	
Green	Lynne Allison	312	15.0	
Liberal Democrats	Sandra Jean Ward	246	11.9	
Liberal Democrats	Chris Corbey-West	168	—	
Liberal Democrats	Alex Benakis	117	—	
Turnout		—	37.2	
Labour win (new seat)				
Conservative win (new seat)				
Conservative win (new seat)				

=== Handside ===
Handside
Party	Candidate	Votes	%	±%
Conservative	Fiona Thomson	1,202	42.2	
Conservative	Helen Elizabeth Bromley	1,170	—	
Liberal Democrats	Rachel Lesley Basch	1,020	35.8	
Liberal Democrats	Nigel Alan Quinton	1,016	—	
Conservative	Graham Eric Dowler	1,015	—	
Liberal Democrats	Ayesha Rohale	824	—	
Labour	Nick Atkinson	451	15.8	
Labour	Tony Grice	430	—	
Labour	Darren Lewis	386	—	
Green	Cecile May Raw	180	6.3	
Turnout		—	51.2	
Conservative win (new seat)				
Conservative win (new seat)				
Liberal Democrats win (new seat)				

=== Hatfield Central ===
Hatfield Central
Party	Candidate	Votes	%	±%
Labour	Maureen Janet Cook	786	55.7	
Labour	Glyn Charles Hayes	742	—	
Labour	Pankit Shah	683	—	
Conservative	James Samuel Crosse	455	32.2	
Conservative	Bukky Olawoyin	392	—	
Conservative	Ronald Leonard Wheeler	371	—	
Liberal Democrats	John Adam Edwards	171	12.1	
Liberal Democrats	Karen Elizabeth Richardson	166	—	
Liberal Democrats	Charles David Perry Walton	127	—	
Turnout		—	27.5	
Labour win (new seat)				
Labour win (new seat)				
Labour win (new seat)				

=== Hatfield East ===
Hatfield East
Party	Candidate	Votes	%	±%
Conservative	Kerstin Birgit Holman	765	34.0	
Conservative	Caroline Ruth Gillett	731	—	
Labour	Lenny Brandon	717	31.9	
Labour	Philip John Knott	663	—	
Conservative	Manoj Kumar	575	—	
Labour	Bhumi Zhaveri	499	—	
Independent	Caron Anne Juggins	315	14.0	
Green	Ian Gregory	229	10.2	
Liberal Democrats	Lis Meyland-Smith	225	10.0	
Green	Christianne Sayers	201	—	
Green	Oliver Sayers	105	—	
Turnout		—	34.9	
Conservative win (new seat)				
Conservative win (new seat)				
Labour win (new seat)				

=== Hatfield South West ===
Hatfield South West
Party	Candidate	Votes	%	±%
Labour	John Christopher Fitzpatrick	713	44.8	
Labour	James Robert Alan Broach	703	—	
Labour	Kieran Michael Thope	698	—	
Conservative	Tom Boon	481	30.2	
Conservative	Jack Adams	477	—	
Conservative	David John Perkins	384	—	
UKIP	Sanjay Gadhvi	222	13.9	
Liberal Democrats	Sheila Jean Archer	176	11.1	
Liberal Democrats	Hazel Marion Laming	168	—	
Liberal Democrats	Simon John Archer	155	—	
Turnout		—	30.7	
Labour win (new seat)				
Labour win (new seat)				
Labour win (new seat)				

=== Hatfield Villages ===
Hatfield Villages
Party	Candidate	Votes	%	±%
Conservative	Lynne Michele Sparks	731	49.9	
Conservative	Howard Morgan	690	—	
Conservative	Duncan James Bell	667	—	
Labour	Margaret Anne Eames-Petersen	555	37.9	
Labour	Alexander David Widger	507	—	
Labour	Graham Martin Beevers	480	—	
Liberal Democrats	Jane Quinton	178	12.2	
Liberal Democrats	Ros Edwards	151	—	
Liberal Democrats	Matthew John Quenet	146	—	
Turnout		—	29.9	
Conservative win (new seat)				
Conservative win (new seat)				
Conservative win (new seat)				

=== Hollybush ===
Hollybush
Party	Candidate	Votes	%	±%
Conservative	Nick Pace	700	40.7	
Labour	Margaret Birleson	670	38.9	
Labour	Lynn Anne Chesterman	664	—	
Labour	Astrid Carle Thorpe	585	—	
Conservative	Drew Robert Richardson	532	—	
Conservative	Syam Puli	492	—	
UKIP	James Andrew Milliken	247	14.3	
Liberal Democrats	Paul Graham Wilson	105	6.1	
Liberal Democrats	Jonquil Basch	75	—	
Liberal Democrats	Konrad Basch	68	—	
Turnout		—	31.9	
Conservative win (new seat)				
Labour win (new seat)				
Labour win (new seat)				

=== Howlands ===
Howlands
Party	Candidate	Votes	%	±%
Labour	Alan Chesterman	724	36.2	
Labour	Pauline Jill Weston	654	—	
Labour	Max Peter Holloway	626	—	
Conservative	Annalisa Dorothy Yeowell	580	29.0	
Conservative	Mark Alexander Smith	498	—	
Conservative	Kamala Chandrasekaran	483	—	
UKIP	Dean James Milliken	314	15.7	
Independent	Stan Tunstall	192	9.6	
Liberal Democrats	Laurence Geoffrey Brown	190	9.5	
Liberal Democrats	Michael Damian Joseph Tuohy	111	—	
Turnout		—	33.5	
Labour win (new seat)				
Labour win (new seat)				
Labour win (new seat)				

=== Northaw and Cuffley ===
Northaw and Cuffley
Party	Candidate	Votes	%	±%
Conservative	Irene Hilda Dene	1,112	68.6	
Conservative	George Michaelides	984	—	
Conservative	Bernard John Sarson	957	—	
Liberal Democrats	Robina Helen Durrant	299	18.4	
Liberal Democrats	Liz Johnson	249	—	
Labour	Graham Morris MacArthur	210	13.0	
Liberal Democrats	Howard Clive Johnson	209	—	
Turnout		—	31.9	
Conservative win (new seat)				
Conservative win (new seat)				
Conservative win (new seat)				

=== Panshanger ===
Panshanger
Party	Candidate	Votes	%	±%
Conservative	Martyn John Levitt	744	45.8	
Conservative	Sara Louise Clare Johnston	706	—	
Conservative	Darren Malcolm Bennett	632	—	
Labour	Joshua Murombo Chigwangwa	363	22.3	
Labour	Steve Iwasyk	362	—	
Green	Henry Humphreys	267	16.4	
Liberal Democrats	Michael Trup	252	15.5	
Liberal Democrats	Charlotte Packer	188	—	
Liberal Democrats	Jon Arch	153	—	
Turnout		—	30.9	
Conservative win (new seat)				
Conservative win (new seat)				
Conservative win (new seat)				

=== Peartree ===
Peartree
Party	Candidate	Votes	%	±%
Liberal Democrats	Malcolm Cowan	533	36.1	
Labour	Steve Roberts	474	32.1	
Labour	Helen Jane Beckett	474	—	
Liberal Democrats	Michal Siewniak	426	—	
Labour	Mel Jones	409	—	
Liberal Democrats	Frank Annibale Stefano Marchio Marsh	377	—	
Conservative	Nathaniel Alfred Keith Chapman	267	18.1	
UKIP	Tom Holdsworth	204	13.8	
Conservative	Paul Joseph Lowe	166	—	
Conservative	Emma	144	—	
Turnout		—	29.8	
Liberal Democrats win (new seat)				
Labour win (new seat)				
Labour win (new seat)				

=== Sherrards ===
Sherrards
Party	Candidate	Votes	%	±%
Conservative	Harry Bower	887	38.2	
Conservative	Pat Mabbott	798	—	
Conservative	Jon Beckerman	749	—	
Labour	Ivan Samuel Edwards	629	27.1	
Green	Susan Groom	500	21.6	
Green	Ian Nendick	353	—	
Liberal Democrats	Karen Eaton	304	13.1	
Liberal Democrats	Brian Douglas Eaton	267	—	
Green	Lesley Smith	191	—	
Turnout		—	41.3	
Conservative win (new seat)				
Conservative win (new seat)				
Conservative win (new seat)				

=== Welham Green and Hatfield South ===
Welham Green and Hatfield South
Party	Candidate	Votes	%	±%
Liberal Democrats	Paul Mark Zukowskyj	894	47.7	
Liberal Democrats	Tom Bailey	640	—	
Liberal Democrats	Helen Quenet	617	—	
Conservative	Keith John Pieri	600	32.0	
Conservative	Frank Robert Bowron	529	—	
Conservative	Les Page	509	—	
Labour	Linda Elizabeth Mendez	381	20.3	
Labour	Diana Lesley Bell	376	—	
Labour	Cathy Watson	294	—	
Turnout		—	34.9	
Liberal Democrats win (new seat)				
Liberal Democrats win (new seat)				
Liberal Democrats win (new seat)				

=== Welwyn East ===
Welwyn East
Party	Candidate	Votes	%	±%
Conservative	Julie Ann Cragg	1,035	45.9	
Conservative	Roger Trigg	972	—	
Conservative	Steven Markiewicz	947	—	
Labour	Sheila Ann Barrett	515	22.9	
Liberal Democrats	Helen Natalie Harrington	426	18.9	
Liberal Democrats	Heather Margaret Richardson	332	—	
UKIP	Arthur Frank Stevens	277	12.3	
Turnout		—	36.6	
Conservative win (new seat)				
Conservative win (new seat)				
Conservative win (new seat)				

=== Welwyn West ===
Welwyn West
Party	Candidate	Votes	%	±%
Conservative	Mandy Perkins	1,011	39.7	
Conservative	Tony Kingsbury	994	—	
Conservative	Nick Taylor	941	—	
Independent	Sandra Anne Kyriakides	896	35.2	
Liberal Democrats	John Edward Blackburn	337	13.2	
Labour	Tony Crump	304	11.9	
Liberal Democrats	Kay Marion Mason	250	—	
Turnout		—	42.4	
Conservative win (new seat)				
Conservative win (new seat)				
Conservative win (new seat)				

== By-Elections ==
=== Haldens ===
A by-election was held on 17 November 2016 following the resignation of Malcolm Spinks.

Haldens
Party	Candidate	Votes	%	±%
Conservative	Nathaniel Alfred Keith Chapman	507	34.3	▼1.1
Labour	Astrid Carle Thorpe	454	30.7	▼7.0
Liberal Democrats	Anthony Benjamin Dennis	437	29.5	▲17.6
Green	Lynne Christine Allison	81	5.5	N//A
Majority		53	3.6	—
Turnout		1,479	29.3	—
Conservative hold		Swing	▲3.0	

=== Panshanger ===
A by-election was held on 4 May 2017 following the resignation of Martyn Levitt.

Panshanger
Party	Candidate	Votes	%	±%
Conservative	Terry Mitchinson	673	39.3	▼6.5
Liberal Democrats	Ayesha Rohale	620	36.2	▲20.7
Labour	Lucy Musk	418	24.4	▲2.1
Majority		53	3.1	—
Turnout		1,711	38.3	—
Conservative hold		Swing	▼13.6	

=== Hatfield Villages ===
A by-election was held on 8 June 2017 following the death of Howard Morgan.

Haldens
Party	Candidate	Votes	%	±%
Labour	Tara-Mary Lyons	1,359	40.1	▲2.2
Conservative	Peter Hebden	1,352	39.9	▼10.0
Liberal Democrats	Jane Quinton	677	20.0	▲7.8
Majority		7	0.2	—
Turnout		3,388	66.0	—
Labour gain from Conservative		Swing	▲6.1	

=== Handside ===
A by-election was held on 14 December 2017 following the resignation of Rachel Basch.

Handside
Party	Candidate	Votes	%	±%
Liberal Democrats	Siobhan Anne Elam	1,105	52.4	▲16.6
Conservative	Drew Robert Richardson	691	32.8	▼9.4
Labour	Belinda Claire Yeldon	260	12.3	▼3.5
Green	Berenice Constance Mary Dowlen	51	2.4	▼3.9
Majority		414	19.6	—
Turnout		2,107	38.5	—
Liberal Democrats hold		Swing	▲13.0	
