= 2021 Welwyn Hatfield Borough Council election =

2021 UK local government election

| ← 2019 | 6 May 2021 | 2022 → |

17 out of 48 seats to Welwyn Hatfield Borough Council 25 seats needed for a majority

| | First party | Second party | Third party |
|---|---|---|---|
| Leader | Tony Kingsbury | Paul Zukowskyj | Malcolm Cowan |
| Party | Conservative | Liberal Democrats | Labour |
| Last election | 23 | 12 | 13 |
| Seats before | 23 | 12 | 13 |
| Seats won | 8 | 2 | 0 |
| Seats after | 28 | 11 | 9 |
| Seat change | ▲5 | ▼1 | ▼4 |
| Popular vote | 14,916 | 6,576 | 6,576 |
| Percentage | 48.7% | 21.5% | 24.0% |
| Swing | ▲9.9% | ▼10.7% | ▼1.4% |
- Map showing the results of the 2021 Welwyn Hatfield Borough Council election
Leader before election
No overall control
Leader after election
Tony Kingsbury
Conservative

Elections to Welwyn Hatfield Borough Council took place on 6 May 2021. This was on the same day as other local elections across the United Kingdom.

At the previous election the Liberal Democrats managed to gain enough of the popular vote to end the Conservatives majority of the council for the first time since 2002. However, the results saw the Conservatives regaining much of the popular vote at the cost of the Liberal Democrats, with a swing of nearly 10 points. The Conservatives gained five seats, resulting in them once again gaining majority control of the council, with a working majority of eight. The leader of the Conservatives on the council, Tony Kingsbury, assumed the position of leader of the council, and swiftly confirmed a new cabinet portfolio consisting of his fellow Conservative councillors.

Despite a relatively minor drop in the vote share, Labour lost four of their seats. This marked the first time Labour failed to win a seat in a set of Welwyn Hatfield's local elections in the council's history. These loses were also enough for them to have less seats on the council than the Liberal Democrats, meaning for the first time the Liberal Democrats were the official opposition on the council. The Green Party also nearly doubled their share of the vote, although they still finished last in all their contested seats.

== Results summary ==
2021 Welwyn Hatfield Borough Council election
| Party | This election | | | Full council | | | This election | | |
| Party | Seats | Net | Seats % | Other | Total | Total % | Votes | Votes % | +/− |
|---|---|---|---|---|---|---|---|---|---|
| Conservative | 15 | ▲5 | 88.2 | 13 | 28 | 58.3 | 14,916 | 48.7 | +9.9 |
| Liberal Democrats | 2 | ▼1 | 11.8 | 9 | 11 | 22.9 | 6,576 | 21.5 | -10.7 |
| Labour | 0 | ▼4 | 0.0 | 9 | 9 | 18.8 | 7,370 | 24.0 | -1.4 |
| Green | 0 | Steady | 0.0 | 0 | 0 | 0.0 | 1,655 | 5.4 | +2.9 |
| Abolish the Town Council | 0 | Steady | 0.0 | 0 | 0 | 0.0 | 86 | 0.3 | New |
| For Britain | 0 | Steady | 0.0 | 0 | 0 | 0.0 | 42 | 0.1 | New |

== Ward results ==
=== Brookmans Park and Little Heath ===
Brookmans Park and Little Heath
| Party | Candidate | Votes | % | ±% |
|---|---|---|---|---|
| Conservative | Stephen Boulton | 1,559 | 73.2 | +5.4 |
| Labour | Graham Beevers | 339 | 15.9 | +4.1 |
| Liberal Democrats | Peter Basford | 232 | 10.9 | −9.5 |
| Majority | | 1,220 | 57.3 | +9.9 |
| Turnout | | 2,130 | 42.3 | +4.8 |
| Conservative hold | | Swing | ▲0.7 | |

=== Haldens ===
Haldens
| Party | Candidate | Votes | % | ±% |
|---|---|---|---|---|
| Conservative | Alastair Hellyer | 766 | 43.7 | +7.9 |
| Labour | Mike Larkins | 589 | 33.6 | +1.2 |
| Liberal Democrats | Rhiannon Richardson | 245 | 14.0 | −7.5 |
| Green | Sarah Butcher | 153 | 8.7 | −1.6 |
| Majority | | 177 | 10.1 | +6.9 |
| Turnout | | 1,753 | 36.0 | +3.6 |
| Conservative gain from Labour | | Swing | ▲3.4 | |

=== Handside ===
Handside
| Party | Candidate | Votes | % | ±% |
|---|---|---|---|---|
| Conservative | Fiona Thomson | 1,317 | 46.3 | +20.0 |
| Liberal Democrats | Gemma Moore | 1,003 | 35.3 | −23.4 |
| Labour | Helen Beckett | 316 | 11.1 | +3.1 |
| Green | Ian Nendick | 208 | 7.3 | +0.3 |
| Majority | | 314 | 11.0 | — |
| Turnout | | 2,844 | 52.2 | +5.4 |
| Conservative hold | | Swing | ▲21.7 | |

=== Hatfield Central ===
Hatfield Central
| Party | Candidate | Votes | % | ±% |
|---|---|---|---|---|
| Conservative | James Bond | 580 | 42.7 | +9.0 |
| Labour | Maureen Cook | 571 | 42.0 | −3.1 |
| Liberal Democrats | Michelle Kirk | 122 | 9.0 | −12.2 |
| Abolish the Town Council | Melvyn Jones | 86 | 6.3 | N/A |
| Majority | | 9 | 0.7 | — |
| Turnout | | 2,844 | 25.1 | +0.8 |
| Conservative gain from Labour | | Swing | ▲6.1 | |

=== Hatfield East ===
Hatfield East
| Party | Candidate | Votes | % | ±% |
|---|---|---|---|---|
| Conservative | James Lake | 810 | 44.6 | +9.2 |
| Labour | Cathy Watson | 552 | 30.4 | +4.8 |
| Liberal Democrats | Richard Snowdon | 289 | 15.9 | −15.5 |
| Green | Ian Gregory | 165 | 9.1 | +0.2 |
| Majority | | 258 | 14.2 | — |
| Turnout | | 1,816 | 32.5 | −0.7 |
| Conservative hold | | Swing | ▲4.5 | |

=== Hatfield South West ===
Hatfield South West
| Party | Candidate | Votes | % | ±% |
|---|---|---|---|---|
| Conservative | Craig Stanbury | 526 | 33.9 | +9.1 |
| Labour | James Broach | 515 | 33.2 | −6.4 |
| Liberal Democrats | Timothy Rowse | 510 | 32.9 | +6.0 |
| Majority | | 11 | 0.7 | — |
| Turnout | | 1,551 | 28.7 | +0.8 |
| Conservative gain from Labour | | Swing | ▲11.1 | |

=== Hatfield Villages ===
Hatfield Villages
| Party | Candidate | Votes | % | ±% |
|---|---|---|---|---|
| Conservative | Samuel Kasumu | 774 | 45.6 | +0.3 |
| Labour | Margaret Eames-Petersen | 585 | 34.4 | −5.3 |
| Liberal Democrats | Adam Edwards | 190 | 11.2 | −3.9 |
| Green | Andreas Kukol | 150 | 8.8 | N/A |
| Majority | | 189 | 11.2 | +5.6 |
| Turnout | | 1,699 | 31.4 | +4.2 |
| Conservative hold | | Swing | ▲2.8 | |

=== Hollybush ===
Hollybush
| Party | Candidate | Votes | % | ±% |
|---|---|---|---|---|
| Conservative | Nick Pace | 653 | 42.9 | +4.9 |
| Labour | Mbizo Mpofu | 583 | 38.3 | −9.6 |
| Liberal Democrats | Christopher Corbey-West | 148 | 9.7 | −4.4 |
| Green | Claudia Ferlisi | 139 | 9.1 | N/A |
| Majority | | 70 | 4.6 | — |
| Turnout | | 1,523 | 30.6 | +3.4 |
| Conservative hold | | Swing | ▲7.3 | |

=== Howlands ===
Howlands
| Party | Candidate | Votes | % | ±% |
|---|---|---|---|---|
| Conservative | Steve McNamara | 962 | 52.5 | +19.9 |
| Labour | Alan Chesterman | 680 | 37.1 | −6.3 |
| Liberal Democrats | Konrad Basch | 190 | 10.4 | −1.5 |
| Majority | | 282 | 15.4 | — |
| Turnout | | 1,832 | 34.3 | +3.5 |
| Conservative gain from Labour | | Swing | ▲13.1 | |

=== Northaw and Cuffley ===
Northaw and Cuffley
| Party | Candidate | Votes | % | ±% |
|---|---|---|---|---|
| Conservative | Gail Ganney | 1,328 | 75.2 | +6.7 |
| Labour | Sheila Barrett | 223 | 12.6 | +2.7 |
| Liberal Democrats | Elizabeth Johnson | 215 | 12.2 | −10.5 |
| Majority | | 1,105 | 62.6 | +16.8 |
| Turnout | | 1,766 | 37.2 | +5.4 |
| Conservative hold | | Swing | ▲2.0 | |

=== Panshanger ===
Panshanger
| Party | Candidate | Votes | % | ±% |
|---|---|---|---|---|
| Conservative | Stan Tunstall | 819 | 49.5 | +13.0 |
| Liberal Democrats | Darrell Panter | 491 | 29.7 | −19.1 |
| Labour | Joshua Chigwangwa | 343 | 20.8 | +6.1 |
| Majority | | 328 | 19.8 | — |
| Turnout | | 1,653 | 36.9 | +0.4 |
| Conservative hold | | Swing | ▲16.1 | |

=== Peartree ===
Peartree
| Party | Candidate | Votes | % | ±% |
|---|---|---|---|---|
| Liberal Democrats | Russ Platt | 578 | 40.4 | −10.0 |
| Labour | Steve Iwasyk | 408 | 28.5 | −4.1 |
| Conservative | Hamish Haddow | 336 | 23.5 | +6.5 |
| Green | Nicola Chapman | 109 | 7.6 | N/A |
| Majority | | 170 | 11.9 | −5.9 |
| Turnout | | 1,431 | 27.3 | +1.2 |
| Liberal Democrats hold | | Swing | ▼3.0 | |

=== Sherrards ===
Sherrards
| Party | Candidate | Votes | % | ±% |
|---|---|---|---|---|
| Conservative | Flavia Wachuku | 767 | 37.5 | +7.4 |
| Liberal Democrats | Arvindkumar Thakkar | 575 | 28.1 | −18.4 |
| Labour | Hilary Carlen | 477 | 23.3 | +10.9 |
| Green | Lesley Smith | 228 | 11.1 | +5.6 |
| Majority | | 192 | 9.4 | — |
| Turnout | | 2,047 | 46.0 | +1.8 |
| Conservative hold | | Swing | ▲12.9 | |

=== Welham Green and Hatfield South ===
Welham Green and Hatfield South (2 seats due to by-election)
| Party | Candidate | Votes | % | ±% |
|---|---|---|---|---|
| Liberal Democrats | Paul Zukowskyj | 791 | 50.5 | +3.5 |
| Conservative | Teresa Travell | 727 | 46.4 | +14.5 |
| Conservative | Paul Lowe | 543 | 34.7 | +2.8 |
| Liberal Democrats | Richard Griffiths | 525 | 33.5 | −13.5 |
| Labour | Gareth Aicken | 258 | 16.5 | −4.5 |
| Labour | John Eames-Petersen | 245 | 15.6 | −5.4 |
| For Britain | Mia Americanos-Molinaro | 42 | 2.7 | N/A |
| Turnout | | — | 34.2 | |
| Liberal Democrats hold | | Swing | | |
| Conservative gain from Liberal Democrats | | Swing | | |

=== Welwyn East ===
Welwyn East
| Party | Candidate | Votes | % | ±% |
|---|---|---|---|---|
| Conservative | Julie Cragg | 1,218 | 56.3 | +4.9 |
| Labour | Martine Davis | 425 | 19.7 | +0.2 |
| Liberal Democrats | Helen Harrington | 278 | 12.9 | −16.1 |
| Green | William Berrington | 241 | 11.1 | N/A |
| Majority | | 793 | 36.6 | +14.2 |
| Turnout | | 2,162 | 42.2 | +6.7 |
| Conservative hold | | Swing | ▲2.4 | |

=== Welwyn West ===
Welwyn West
| Party | Candidate | Votes | % | ±% |
|---|---|---|---|---|
| Conservative | Paul Smith | 1,231 | 63.5 | +8.0 |
| Green | Penny Berrington | 262 | 13.5 | +6.5 |
| Labour | Daniel Carlen | 251 | 13.0 | +6.5 |
| Liberal Democrats | Alan Reimer | 194 | 10.0 | −21.0 |
| Majority | | 969 | 50.0 | +25.5 |
| Turnout | | 1,938 | 39.8 | +2.6 |
| Conservative hold | | Swing | ▲0.8 | |
