= 1976 Welwyn Hatfield District Council election =

Welwyn Hatfield District Council election

- 6 May 1976

43 out of 43 seats to Welwyn Hatfield District Council 23 seats needed for a majority
- Turnout: ~34,425, 50.6%

	First party	Second party	Third party
Party	Conservative	Labour	Liberal
Last election	19 seats, 37.8%	24 seats, 56.4%	0 seats, 5.4%
Seats before	19	24	0
Seats after	24	19	0
Seat change	▲5	▼5	Steady
Popular vote	50, 742	35,470	5,633
Percentage	55.2%	38.6%	6.1%
Swing	▲17.4	▼17.8	▲0.7
- Council composition following the election.

The 1976 Welwyn Hatfield District Council election took place on 6 May 1976 to elect members of Welwyn Hatfield District Council in England. This was on the same day as other local elections. All seats were up for election. In a reversal of the initial election the Conservatives managed to secure a majority of the total votes over their main rivals the Labour Party, gaining enough seats to take control of the council, albeit by only two seats.

== Summary ==
=== Election result ===
1976 Welwyn Hatfield District Council election
Party	Seats	Gains	Losses	Net gain/loss	Seats %	Votes %	Votes	+/−
Conservative	24			▲5	55.8	55.2	50,742	+17.4
Labour	19			▼5	44.2	38.6	35,470	–17.8
Liberal	0			Steady	0.0	6.1	5,633	+0.7
