= 2022 Welwyn Hatfield Borough Council election =

2022 UK local government election

← 2021	5 May 2022	2023 →

17 out of 48 seats to Welwyn Hatfield Borough Council 25 seats needed for a majority

	First party	Second party	Third party
Party	Conservative	Liberal Democrats	Labour
Last election	29 seats, 48.7%	10 seats, 21.5%	9 seats, 24.0%
Seats won	4	7	6
Seats after	26	12	10
Seat change	▼3	▲2	▲1
Popular vote	11,529	9,198	9,250
Percentage	37.1%	29.6%	29.8%
Swing	▼11.6%	▲8.1%	▲5.8%
- Winner of each seat at the 2022 Welwyn Hatfield Borough Council election
Council control before election
Conservative
Council control after election
Conservative

Elections to Welwyn Hatfield Borough Council took place on 5 May 2022. This was on the same day as other local elections across the United Kingdom.

== Results summary ==
2022 Welwyn Hatfield Borough Council election
Party	This election			Full council			This election		
Party	Seats	Net	Seats %	Other	Total	Total %	Votes	Votes %	+/−
Conservative	4	▼3	23.5	22	26	52.1	11,529	37.1	-11.6
Liberal Democrats	7	▲2	41.2	5	12	27.1	9,198	29.6	+8.1
Labour	6	▲1	35.3	4	10	20.8	9,250	29.8	+5.8
Green	0	Steady	0.0	0	0	0.0	798	2.6	-2.8
Abolish the BBC TV Licence	0	Steady	0.0	0	0	0.0	270	0.9	N/A
For Britain	0	Steady	0.0	0	0	0.0	19	0.1	±0.0

== Ward results ==
=== Brookmans Park and Little Heath ===
Brookmans Park and Little Heath
Party	Candidate	Votes	%	±%
Conservative	Rebecca Lass	1,242	65.0	−8.2
Labour	Graham Beevers	365	19.1	+3.2
Liberal Democrats	Michael Anscombe	304	15.9	+5.0
Majority		877	45.9	
Turnout		1,911	38.6	
Conservative hold		Swing	▼5.7	

=== Haldens ===
Haldens
Party	Candidate	Votes	%	±%
Labour	Lucy Musk	882	50.4	+16.8
Conservative	Neil Bradbury	618	35.3	−8.4
Liberal Democrats	Simon Goldwater	250	14.3	+0.3
Majority		264	15.1	
Turnout		1,750	35.9	
Labour hold		Swing	▲12.6	

=== Handside ===
Handside (2 seats due to by-election)
Party	Candidate	Votes	%	±%
Liberal Democrats	Gemma Moore	1,457	55.7	+20.4
Liberal Democrats	Michal Siewniak	1,431	54.7	+19.4
Conservative	Tony Bailey	726	27.7	−18.6
Conservative	John Gilbey	695	26.5	−19.8
Labour	Perry Hewitt	312	11.9	+0.8
Labour	Moyna Aicken	268	10.2	−0.9
Green	Penelope Berrington	260	9.9	+2.6
Abolish the BBC TV Licence	Clare Stevenson	87	3.3	N/A
Turnout			50.4	
Liberal Democrats hold				
Liberal Democrats hold				

=== Hatfield Central ===
Hatfield Central
Party	Candidate	Votes	%	±%
Labour	Pankit Shah	736	52.8	+10.8
Conservative	Mark Smith	466	33.4	−9.3
Liberal Democrats	Adam Edwards	192	13.8	+4.8
Majority		270	19.4	
Turnout		1,394	26.2	
Labour hold		Swing	▲10.1	

=== Hatfield East ===
Hatfield East
Party	Candidate	Votes	%	±%
Labour	Larry Crofton	804	44.1	+13.7
Conservative	Peter Hebden	700	38.4	−6.2
Liberal Democrats	Richard Griffiths	190	10.4	−5.5
Green	Ian Gregory	130	7.1	−2.0
Majority		104	5.7	
Turnout		1,824	32.9	
Labour gain from Conservative		Swing	▲10.0	

=== Hatfield South West ===
Hatfield South West
Party	Candidate	Votes	%	±%
Liberal Democrats	Tim Rowse	705	45.4	+12.5
Labour	Kieran Thorpe	491	31.6	−1.6
Conservative	Gav Solomons	308	19.8	−14.1
Abolish the BBC TV Licence	Melvyn Jones	50	3.2	N/A
Majority		214	13.8	
Turnout		1,554	28.7	
Liberal Democrats gain from Labour		Swing	▲7.1	

=== Hatfield Villages ===
Hatfield Villages
Party	Candidate	Votes	%	±%
Labour	James Broach	753	46.2	+11.8
Conservative	Antony Demetriou	667	40.9	−4.7
Liberal Democrats	Anthony Green	210	12.9	+1.7
Majority		86	5.3	
Turnout		1,630	29.5	
Labour gain from Conservative		Swing	▲8.3	

=== Hollybush ===
Hollybush
Party	Candidate	Votes	%	±%
Labour	Lynn Chesterman	877	57.8	+19.5
Conservative	Abbie Cook	478	31.5	−11.4
Liberal Democrats	Jonquil Basch	163	10.7	+1.0
Majority		399	26.3	
Turnout		1,518	31.3	
Labour hold		Swing	▲15.4	

=== Howlands ===
Howlands
Party	Candidate	Votes	%	±%
Labour	Max Holloway	1,072	58.5	+21.4
Conservative	Marios Artemi	631	34.5	−18.0
Liberal Democrats	Hillary Skoczylas	128	7.0	−3.4
Majority		441	24.0	
Turnout		1,831	34.9	
Labour hold		Swing	▲19.7	

=== Northaw and Cuffley ===
Northaw and Cuffley
Party	Candidate	Votes	%	±%
Conservative	Bernard Sarson	1,076	67.8	−7.4
Labour	Sheila Barrett	279	17.6	+5.0
Liberal Democrats	Peter Basford	232	14.6	+2.4
Majority		797	50.2	
Turnout		1,587	33.9	
Conservative hold		Swing	▼6.2	

=== Panshanger ===
Panshanger
Party	Candidate	Votes	%	±%
Liberal Democrats	Darrell Panter	594	39.3	+9.6
Conservative	Ahmad Chattha	515	34.1	−15.4
Labour	Alan Chesterman	402	26.6	+5.8
Majority		79	5.2	
Turnout		1,511	34.3	
Liberal Democrats hold		Swing	▲12.5	

=== Peartree ===
Peartree
Party	Candidate	Votes	%	±%
Liberal Democrats	Duncan Jones	770	51.8	+11.4
Labour	Erin Smith	497	33.4	+4.9
Conservative	David Perkins	173	11.6	−11.9
Abolish the BBC TV Licence	Aaron Johnson	47	3.2	N/A
Majority		273	18.4	
Turnout		1,487	28.0	
Liberal Democrats hold		Swing	▲3.3	

=== Sherrards ===
Sherrards
Party	Candidate	Votes	%	±%
Liberal Democrats	Jean-Paul Skoczylas	1,114	54.4	+26.3
Conservative	Siva Kumar	498	24.3	−13.2
Labour	Hilary Carlen	293	14.3	−9.0
Green	William Berrington	101	4.9	−6.2
Abolish the BBC TV Licence	Caroline Jones	42	2.1	N/A
Majority		616	30.1	
Turnout		2,048	46.7	
Liberal Democrats hold		Swing	▲19.8	

=== Welham Green and Hatfield South ===
Welham Green and Hatfield South
Party	Candidate	Votes	%	±%
Liberal Democrats	Sandreni Bonfante	771	45.6	+2.1
Conservative	Phil Kurland	561	33.2	−6.8
Labour	Cathy Watson	296	17.5	+3.3
Abolish the BBC TV Licence	Sian Hems	44	2.6	N/A
For Britain	Mia Americanos-Molinaro	19	1.1	−1.2
Majority		210	12.4	
Turnout		1,691	32.0	
Liberal Democrats hold		Swing	▲4.5	

=== Welwyn East ===
Welwyn East
Party	Candidate	Votes	%	±%
Conservative	Terry Mitchinson	1,144	52.1	−4.2
Labour	Daniel Carlen	633	28.8	+9.1
Liberal Democrats	Alan Reimer	419	19.1	+6.2
Majority		511	23.3	
Turnout		2,196	42.9	
Conservative hold		Swing	▼6.7	

=== Welwyn West ===
Welwyn West
Party	Candidate	Votes	%	±%
Conservative	Sunny Thusu	1,031	54.4	−9.1
Green	Sarah Butcher	307	16.2	+2.7
Labour	Gareth Aicken	290	15.3	+2.3
Liberal Democrats	Genevieve Almeyda	268	14.1	+4.1
Majority		724	38.2	
Turnout		1,896	39.1	
Conservative hold		Swing	▼5.9	
