= Welwyn Tool Group =

British tool distribution company

Welwyn Tool Group Limited
- Company type: Private
- Industry: Tool Distribution
- Founded: 1952 - Welwyn Garden City, United Kingdom
- Founder: Robert Berman
- Headquarters: Welwyn Garden City, United Kingdom
- Key people: Robert Berman - Founder
- Website: welwyntoolgroup.com

Welwyn Tool Group Limited, is a tool distribution company based in Welwyn Garden City, Hertfordshire, United Kingdom. The company is responsible for the distribution and after-sales service of products manufactured by Swiss company, Leister Technologies in The United Kingdom and Ireland.

== History ==
The company was founded in 1952 by Robert Berman, as Welwyn Tool Co Ltd. During the same year the company formed its partnership with Leister Technologies, opening up the UK market to the company. In 1983 Robert Berman retired from the company, handing ownership to his son Thomas Berman.

In 2005 Thomas Berman announced his retirement. Shortly after his announcement the company was sold to key personnel and became Welwyn Tool Group Limited.

== Products ==
The company primarily distributes tools manufactured by Leister Technologies, however the company also distributes specialist tools manufactured by German company WIDOS.

The key products distributed by the company are:

- Plastic Welding Tools
- Plastic Extrusion Tools
- Pipe Fusion Equipment
- Industrial Process Heaters and Blowers

In addition to this, the company acts as the main service and repair centre for Leister in the United Kingdom and Ireland.

== Divisions ==
- Leister UK - Distribution of Leister tools throughout the UK and Ireland
- Workzone - An online hand tool distributor
- Widos UK - UK Supplier of Widos Plastic Pipe Fusion equipment
