= 2004 Welwyn Hatfield District Council election =

2004 UK local government election

Results of the 2004 Welwyn Hatfield Borough Council election

The 2004 Welwyn Hatfield District Council election took place on 10 June 2004 to elect members of Welwyn Hatfield District Council in Hertfordshire, England. One third of the council was up for election and the Conservative Party stayed in overall control of the council.

After the election, the composition of the council was:

- Conservative 31
- Labour 15
- Liberal Democrat 2

== Election results ==
The results saw the Conservatives increase their majority on the council after both they and the Liberal Democrats gained seats from Labour. The Conservatives made 4 gains from Labour in Hatfield North, Hatfield West, Howlands and Sherrards wards, with one Conservative councillor describing the results as "so good absolutely marvellous". Labour put their defeats down to mid-term unpopularity of the national Labour government.

However the Conservatives did lose one seat to the Liberal Democrats in Handside, and this, along with a Liberal Democrat gain from Labour in Hatfield Central, meant that the Liberal Democrats won their first seats on the council for 14 years. The Liberal Democrats said they had been successful after campaigning on local issues such as maintaining Welwyn Garden City and on Stanborough Park.

Meanwhile, the one candidate from the United Kingdom Independence Party came second in Northaw ward ahead of both Labour and the Liberal Democrats. Overall turnout in the election was 40.61%, a significant rise on the 2003 election. The Green Party stood their first ever candidate for a Welwyn Hatfield council seat in Hatfield East ward. However, the result was disappointing for the party, finishing in a distant last place with only 7.% of the local vote.

Welwyn Hatfield local election result 2004
Party	Seats	Gains	Losses	Net gain/loss	Seats %	Votes %	Votes	+/−
Conservative	11	4	1	+3	64.7	47.4	13,492	+2.3
Labour	4	0	5	-5	23.5	26.5	7,546	-5.8
Liberal Democrats	2	2	0	+2	11.8	24.0	6,828	+1.4
UKIP	0	0	0	0	0.0	1.5	437	+1.5
Green	0	0	0	0	0.0	0.5	137	+0.5

== Ward results ==
Brookmans Park & Little Heath
Party	Candidate	Votes	%	±%
Conservative	Irene Dean	1,549	73.9	−3.3
Liberal Democrats	Nigel Bain	361	17.2	+3.7
Labour	William Couzens	187	8.9	−0.4
Majority		1,188	56.7	−7.0
Turnout		2,097	47.5	
Conservative hold		Swing		

Haldens
Party	Candidate	Votes	%	±%
Labour	Rory Hallahan	600	38.4	−13.1
Conservative	Edward Hall	545	34.8	+7.5
Liberal Democrats	Jonathan Arch	419	26.8	+5.6
Majority		55	3.6	−20.6
Turnout		1,564	36.6	
Labour hold		Swing		

Handside
Party	Candidate	Votes	%	±%
Liberal Democrats	Daniel Cooke	1,230	45.5	+2.0
Conservative	Lance Stanbury	1,180	43.6	−0.8
Labour	Lynn Chesterman	296	10.9	−1.2
Majority		50	1.9	
Turnout		2,706	55.0	
Liberal Democrats gain from Conservative		Swing		

Hatfield Central
Party	Candidate	Votes	%	±%
Liberal Democrats	Hazel Laming	514	37.3	+2.2
Labour	Margaret White	476	34.5	−9.8
Conservative	Andrew Peffer	388	28.2	+7.6
Majority		38	2.8	
Turnout		1,378	32.7	
Liberal Democrats gain from Labour		Swing		

Hatfield East
Party	Candidate	Votes	%	±%
Conservative	Bernard Sarson	883	51.2	−4.0
Labour	Sheila Wilder	376	21.8	−3.1
Liberal Democrats	Lis Meyland-Smith	330	19.1	−0.8
Green	Graham Laverick	137	7.9	+7.9
Majority		507	29.4	−0.9
Turnout		1,726	40.4	
Conservative hold		Swing		

Hatfield North
Party	Candidate	Votes	%	±%
Conservative	Mark Gilding	783	43.7	
Labour	Bridgit Croft	669	37.3	
Liberal Democrats	Janet Gammage	341	19.0	
Majority		114	6.4	
Turnout		1,793	36.6	
Conservative gain from Labour		Swing		

Hatfield South
Party	Candidate	Votes	%	±%
Labour	Linda Mendez	395	50.1	
Conservative	Douglas Berry	242	30.7	
Liberal Democrats	Richard Griffiths	152	19.3	
Majority		153	19.4	
Turnout		789	29.7	
Labour hold		Swing		

Hatfield West
Party	Candidate	Votes	%	±%
Conservative	Ronald Wheeler	731	45.2	−1.8
Labour	Tony Wilder	519	32.1	−5.1
Liberal Democrats	Simon Archer	369	22.8	+7.0
Majority		212	13.1	+3.3
Turnout		1,619	39.2	
Conservative gain from Labour		Swing		

Hollybush
Party	Candidate	Votes	%	±%
Labour	Susan Jones	669	46.3	−9.5
Conservative	Marian Pile	491	34.0	+8.9
Liberal Democrats	Eirwen Smith	286	19.8	+0.7
Majority		178	12.3	−18.4
Turnout		1,446	35.2	
Labour hold		Swing		

Howlands
Party	Candidate	Votes	%	±%
Conservative	Alan Franey	655	38.8	+8.7
Labour	Mark Biddle	643	38.1	−13.7
Liberal Democrats	Pascal Jacquemain	388	23.0	+4.8
Majority		12	0.7	
Turnout		1,686	40.2	
Conservative gain from Labour		Swing		

Northaw
Party	Candidate	Votes	%	±%
Conservative	Colin Couch	1,115	61.4	−18.9
UKIP	Robert Ellingham	437	24.1	+24.1
Liberal Democrats	Jennifer Blumsom	160	8.8	−3.2
Labour	Peter Heyman	104	5.7	−2.0
Majority		678	37.3	−31.0
Turnout		1,816	43.5	
Conservative hold		Swing		

Panshanger
Party	Candidate	Votes	%	±%
Conservative	Roger Trigg	779	46.6	+4.2
Labour	Anthony Crump	448	26.8	−4.5
Liberal Democrats	Ted Naseby	446	26.7	+0.4
Majority		331	19.8	+8.7
Turnout		1,673	35.7	
Conservative hold		Swing		

Peartree
Party	Candidate	Votes	%	±%
Labour	Christopher Cory	607	45.3	−2.4
Liberal Democrats	Wanda Armstrong-Bridges	405	30.2	−4.9
Conservative	Julie Peffer	328	24.5	+7.3
Majority		202	15.1	+2.5
Turnout		1,340	30.4	
Labour hold		Swing		

Sherrards
Party	Candidate	Votes	%	±%
Conservative	Terence Mabbott	970	44.3	−1.3
Labour	Margaret Hurst	814	37.1	−2.8
Liberal Democrats	Frank Marsh	408	18.6	+4.2
Majority		156	7.2	+1.5
Turnout		2,192	51.6	
Conservative gain from Labour		Swing		

Welham Green
Party	Candidate	Votes	%	±%
Conservative	Keith Pieri	745	66.6	+3.3
Labour	Sheila Jones	195	17.4	−5.5
Liberal Democrats	Sheila Archer	179	16.0	+2.2
Majority		550	49.2	+8.8
Turnout		1,119	41.1	
Conservative hold		Swing		

Welwyn North
Party	Candidate	Votes	%	±%
Conservative	Steven Markiewicz	948	64.7	+2.5
Liberal Democrats	Helen Bassett	318	21.7	+0.1
Labour	David Wilson	199	13.6	−2.6
Majority		630	43.0	+2.4
Turnout		1,465	43.2	
Conservative hold		Swing		

Welwyn South
Party	Candidate	Votes	%	±%
Conservative	Stuart Pile	1,160	57.1	−2.9
Liberal Democrats	Ian Skidmore	522	25.7	+5.9
Labour	Julia Henderson	349	17.2	−3.0
Majority		638	31.4	−8.4
Turnout		2,031	47.4	
Conservative hold		Swing		
