= 2003 Welwyn Hatfield District Council election =

2003 UK local government election

Results of the 2003 Welwyn Hatfield Borough Council election

The 2003 Welwyn Hatfield District Council election took place on 1 May 2003 to elect members of Welwyn Hatfield District Council in Hertfordshire, England. One third of the council was up for election and the Conservative Party stayed in overall control of the council.

After the election, the composition of the council was:

- Conservative 27
- Labour 20
- Vacant 1

== Election result ==
The results saw the Conservatives increase their majority on the council after making one gain from Labour in Hatfield West. No other seats changed parties, with the Conservatives holding Sherrards by 123 votes over Labour. The closest result came in Handside ward where the Conservatives held the seat by 20 votes over the Liberal Democrats, meaning that the Liberal Democrats remained without any seats on the council. Overall turnout in the election was 33.1%, down by 2% from the 2002 election, with a quarter of the votes cast being postal votes.

Welwyn Hatfield local election result 2003
Party	Seats	Gains	Losses	Net gain/loss	Seats %	Votes %	Votes	+/−
Conservative	9	1	0	+1	56.3	45.1	9,591	-3.1%
Labour	7	0	1	-1	43.8	32.3	6,858	-2.0%
Liberal Democrats	0	0	0	0	0	22.6	4,794	+5.1%

== Ward results ==
Brookmans Park & Little Heath
Party	Candidate	Votes	%	±%
Conservative	Stephen Boulton	1,203	77.2	+1.3
Liberal Democrats	Catherine Edwards	211	13.5	+0.7
Labour	Margaret White	145	9.3	−2.0
Majority		992	63.7	+0.6
Turnout		1,559		
Conservative hold		Swing		

Haldens
Party	Candidate	Votes	%	±%
Labour	Mike Larkins	652	51.5	−3.1
Conservative	Stuart Jackson	345	27.3	−1.9
Liberal Democrats	Helen Bassett	269	21.2	+5.0
Majority		307	24.2	−1.2
Turnout		1,266		
Labour hold		Swing		

Handside
Party	Candidate	Votes	%	±%
Conservative	Dennis Lewis	1,022	44.4	+2.8
Liberal Democrats	Daniel Cooke	1,002	43.5	+3.0
Labour	Lynn Chesterman	279	12.1	−5.8
Majority		20	0.9	−0.2
Turnout		2,303		
Conservative hold		Swing		

Hatfield Central
Party	Candidate	Votes	%	±%
Labour	Maureen Cook	530	44.3	+1.7
Liberal Democrats	Hazel Laming	420	35.1	−0.8
Conservative	Roger Roberts	247	20.6	−1.0
Majority		110	9.2	+2.5
Turnout		1,197		
Labour hold		Swing		

Hatfield East
Party	Candidate	Votes	%	±%
Conservative	Michael Long	782	55.2	−2.9
Labour	Samuel Smith	352	24.9	−0.5
Liberal Democrats	Lis Meyland-Smith	282	19.9	+3.4
Majority		430	30.3	−2.4
Turnout		1,416		
Conservative hold		Swing		

Hatfield South (2)
Party	Candidate	Votes	%	±%
Labour	Alfred Appleby	377		
Labour	Linda Mendez	376		
Conservative	Ronald Smith	175		
Conservative	Andrew Peffer	164		
Liberal Democrats	Richard Griffiths	111		
Liberal Democrats	Sheila Archer	108		
Turnout		1,311		
Labour hold		Swing		
Labour hold		Swing		

Hatfield West
Party	Candidate	Votes	%	±%
Conservative	John Hawkins	644	47.0	−3.5
Labour	Roy Moss	509	37.2	−0.5
Liberal Democrats	Simon Archer	217	15.8	+4.0
Majority		135	9.8	−3.0
Turnout		1,370		
Conservative gain from Labour		Swing		

Hollybush
Party	Candidate	Votes	%	±%
Labour	Alan Johnson	623	55.8	−4.4
Conservative	Yvonne Stanbury	280	25.1	−2.4
Liberal Democrats	Janet Gammage	213	19.1	+6.8
Majority		343	30.7	−2.0
Turnout		1,116		
Labour hold		Swing		

Howlands
Party	Candidate	Votes	%	±%
Labour	Jill Weston	627	51.8	−1.6
Conservative	Marian Pile	364	30.1	−1.9
Liberal Democrats	Jonathan Arch	220	18.2	+3.6
Majority		263	21.7	+0.3
Turnout		1,211		
Labour hold		Swing		

Northaw
Party	Candidate	Votes	%	±%
Conservative	John Mansfield	990	80.3	+0.7
Liberal Democrats	Nigel Bain	148	12.0	+1.2
Labour	Sheila Jones	95	7.7	−1.9
Majority		842	68.3	−0.5
Turnout		1,233		
Conservative hold		Swing		

Panshanger
Party	Candidate	Votes	%	±%
Conservative	Darren Bennett	615	42.4	−8.5
Labour	Christopher Cory	453	31.3	+1.7
Liberal Democrats	Ted Naseby	381	26.3	+6.8
Majority		162	11.1	−10.2
Turnout		1,449		
Conservative hold		Swing		

Peartree
Party	Candidate	Votes	%	±%
Labour	Stephen Roberts	491	47.7	−11.4
Liberal Democrats	Wanda Armstrong-Bridges	362	35.1	+16.7
Conservative	David Perkins	177	17.2	−5.3
Majority		129	12.6	−24.0
Turnout		1,030		
Labour hold		Swing		

Sherrards
Party	Candidate	Votes	%	±%
Conservative	John Burnapp	984	45.6	−1.4
Labour	Anthony Crump	861	39.9	−2.5
Liberal Democrats	Louise Lotz	311	14.4	+3.8
Majority		123	5.7	+1.1
Turnout		2,156		
Conservative hold		Swing		

Welwyn North
Party	Candidate	Votes	%	±%
Conservative	Julie Cragg	664	62.2	−1.3
Liberal Democrats	David Bartlett	230	21.6	+4.1
Labour	Jan Burnell	173	16.2	−2.9
Majority		434	40.6	−3.8
Turnout		1,067		
Conservative hold		Swing		

Welwyn South
Party	Candidate	Votes	%	±%
Conservative	Richard Smith	935	60.0	−0.8
Labour	Julia Henderson	315	20.2	−6.5
Liberal Democrats	Ian Skidmore	309	19.8	+7.3
Majority		620	39.8	+5.7
Turnout		1,559		
Conservative hold		Swing		
