= 2015 Welwyn Hatfield Borough Council election =

2015 UK local government election

- 7 May 2015

16 out of 48 seats to Welwyn Hatfield Borough Council 25 seats needed for a majority
- Turnout: 67.34%

	First party	Second party
Leader	John Dean	Kieran Thorpe
Party	Conservative	Labour
Leader's seat	Brookmans Park and Little Heath	Hatfield South
Last election	13 seats, 38.6%	4 seats, 22.5%
Seats before	31	14
Seats won	12	4
Seats after	32	14
Seat change	▲1	Steady
Popular vote	23,827	12,246
Percentage	46.1%	23.7%
Swing	▲7.5 pp	▲1.2 pp
	Third party	Fourth party
Leader	N/A	Malcolm Cowan
Party	UKIP	Liberal Democrats
Leader's seat	N/A	Peartree
Last election	0 seats, 21.9%	1 seat, 11.8%
Seats before	0	2
Seats won	0	0
Seats after	0	2
Seat change	Steady	Steady
Popular vote	5,972	5,735
Percentage	11.6%	11.1%
Swing	▼10.3 pp	▼0.7 pp
- Map showing the results of the 2015 Welwyn Hatfield Borough Council election.
Leader before election
John Dean
Conservative
Leader after election
John Dean
Conservative

The 2015 Welwyn Hatfield Borough Council election took place on 7 May 2015 to elect members to Welwyn Hatfield Borough Council in England. This was held on the same day as other local elections and the general election.

== Results by ward ==
=== Brookmans Park and Little Heath ===
Brookmans Park and Little Heath
Party	Candidate	Votes	%	±%
Conservative	Irene Dean	2,671		
Labour	Graham Beevers	394		
Liberal Democrats	Nigel Bain	267		
Green	Marietta Lotz	266		
Majority		2,277		
Turnout		3,598	76.0	
Conservative hold				

=== Haldens ===
Haldens
Party	Candidate	Votes	%	±%
Labour	Mike Larkins	1,161		
Conservative	Carrie Gibson	1,145		
UKIP	Tom Holdsworth	585		
Green	Colin Jeffery	259		
Liberal Democrats	Sandy Ward	214		
Majority		16		
Turnout		3,364	68.0	
Labour hold				

=== Handside ===
Handside
Party	Candidate	Votes	%	±%
Conservative	Fiona Thomson	1,987		
Liberal Democrats	Tony Skottowe	1,317		
Labour	Nick Atkinson	603		
Green	Ian Nendick	266		
Majority		670		
Turnout		4,173	77.0	
Conservative hold				

=== Hatfield Central ===
Hatfield Central
Party	Candidate	Votes	%	±%
Labour	Pankit Shah	1,042		
Conservative	Bukky Olawoyin	763		
UKIP	Richard Colwell	541		
Liberal Democrats	Adam Edwards	214		
Green	Christianne Sayers	143		
TUSC	David James	23		
Majority		279		
Turnout		2,726	55.0	
Labour hold				

=== Hatfield East ===
Hatfield East
Party	Candidate	Votes	%	±%
Conservative	Bernard Sarson	1,412		
Labour	Mike Alder	1,013		
UKIP	Karl Venables	412		
Liberal Democrats	Jackie Brennan	267		
Green	Malcolm Harvey	172		
TUSC	Roy Jenkins	38		
Majority		399		
Turnout		3,314	64.0	
Conservative hold				

=== Hatfield Villages ===
Hatfield Villages
Party	Candidate	Votes	%	±%
Conservative	Lynne Sparks	1,166		
Labour	Margaret Eames-Petersen	770		
UKIP	Sanjay Gadhvi	283		
Green	Bari Martin	191		
Liberal Democrats	Ayesha Rohale	159		
Majority		396		
Turnout		2,569	61.0	
Conservative hold				

=== Hatfield West ===
Hatfield West
Party	Candidate	Votes	%	±%
Labour	James Broach	1,320		
Conservative	Frank Bowron	1,307		
UKIP	Shivani Gadhvi	539		
Liberal Democrats	Sheila Archer	319		
Green	Ian Gregory	210		
Majority		13		
Turnout		3,695	58.0	
Labour gain from Conservative				

=== Hollybush ===
Hollybush
Party	Candidate	Votes	%	±%
Conservative	Nick Pace	1,343		
Labour	Margaret Birleson	1,208		
UKIP	James Milliken	510		
Liberal Democrats	Valerie Skottowe	169		
Green	Zoe Pateman	165		
Majority		135		
Turnout		3,395	63.0	
Conservative gain from Labour				

=== Howlands ===
Howlands
Party	Candidate	Votes	%	±%
Conservative	Annalisa Yeowell	1,219		
Labour	Pauline Weston	998		
UKIP	Dean Milliken	675		
Liberal Democrats	Konrad Basch	144		
Green	Cecile Raw	144		
Majority		221		
Turnout		3,180	68.0	
Conservative hold				

=== Northaw and Cuffley ===
Northaw and Cuffley
Party	Candidate	Votes	%	±%
Conservative	Adrian Prest	2,345		
UKIP	Andre Fernandes	392		
Green	Brian Edwards	268		
Liberal Democrats	Liz Johnson	221		
Majority		1,953		
Turnout		3,226	73.0	
Conservative hold				

=== Panshanger ===
Panshanger
Party	Candidate	Votes	%	±%
Conservative	Darren Bennett	1,441		
Labour	Josh Chigwangwa	702		
Independent	Gary O'Leary	598		
UKIP	Robert Daley	425		
Liberal Democrats	Jonathan Arch	166		
Green	Mark Knight	131		
Majority		739		
Turnout		3,463	69.0	
Conservative hold				

=== Peartree ===
Peartree
Party	Candidate	Votes	%	±%
Labour	Steve Roberts	1,070		
Conservative	Aaron Jacob	736		
Liberal Democrats	Frank Marsh	723		
UKIP	Alex Baker	600		
Green	Berenice Dowlen	170		
Majority		334		
Turnout		3,299	58.0	
Labour hold				

=== Sherrards ===
Sherrards
Party	Candidate	Votes	%	±%
Conservative	Pat Mabbott	1,723		
Labour	John Jones	920		
Green	Susan Groom	404		
Liberal Democrats	Jonquil Basch	307		
Majority		803		
Turnout		3,354	74.0	
Conservative hold				

=== Welham Green ===
Welham Green
Party	Candidate	Votes	%	±%
Conservative	Les Page	781		
Liberal Democrats	Paul Zukowskyj	745		
UKIP	William Braithwaite	285		
Labour	Diana Bell	188		
Green	Sam Allsopp	71		
Majority		36		
Turnout		2,070	70.0	
Conservative hold				

=== Welwyn East ===
Welwyn East
Party	Candidate	Votes	%	±%
Conservative	Carl Storer	2,432		
Labour	John Blanch	465		
UKIP	James Southgate	440		
Liberal Democrats	Lis Meyland-Smith	298		
Green	Mary Barton	228		
Majority		1,967		
Turnout		3,863	78.0	
Conservative hold				

=== Welwyn West ===
Welwyn West
Party	Candidate	Votes	%	±%
Conservative	Mandy Perkins	1,356		
Labour	Peter Heyman	392		
UKIP	Hazel Colwell	285		
Liberal Democrats	Hazel Laming	205		
Green	William Berrington	162		
Majority		964		
Turnout		2,400	72.0	
Conservative hold				
