= 2000 Welwyn Hatfield District Council election =

2000 UK local government election

The 2000 Welwyn Hatfield District Council election took place on 6 May 2000 to elect members of Welwyn Hatfield District Council in Hertfordshire, England. One third of the council was up for election and the Labour Party gained overall control of the council from no overall control. Overall turnout in the election was 31.71%, down from 33.09% in the 1999 election.

After the election, the composition of the council was:

- Labour 25
- Conservative 23

== Election result ==
The results saw Labour gain control of the council with a majority of 2 over the Conservatives, which was a reversal of the trend of the 2000 local elections where Labour overall lost almost 600 councillors.

Welwyn Hatfield local election result 2000
Party	Seats	Gains	Losses	Net gain/loss	Seats %	Votes %	Votes	+/−
Labour	9			+1	56.3	39.0	8,444	
Conservative	7			-1	43.8	45.8	9,926	
Liberal Democrats	0			0	0	13.0	2,816	
National Liberal Party	0			0	0	1.4	298	
UKIP	0			0	0	0.9	187	

== Ward results ==
Brookmans Park & Little Heath
Party	Candidate	Votes	%	±%
Conservative	Storey	1,160	75.6	
Labour	Marcus	207	13.5	
Liberal Democrats	Catherine Edwards	168	10.9	
Majority		953	62.1	
Turnout		1,535	33.9	+1.0

Haldens
Party	Candidate	Votes	%	±%
Labour	Hallahan	729	57.1	
Conservative	Davidson	389	30.5	
Liberal Democrats	Corbishley	159	12.5	
Majority		340	26.6	
Turnout		1,277	27.9	−1.4

Handside
Party	Candidate	Votes	%	±%
Conservative	Stanbury	912	48.8	
Labour	Clark	414	22.2	
Liberal Democrats	Lotz	355	19.0	
UKIP	Biggs	187	10.0	
Majority		498	26.6	
Turnout		1,868	37.0	−1.5

Hatfield Central
Party	Candidate	Votes	%	±%
Labour	Susana Tinsley	560	44.8	
Conservative	Ventimglia	368	29.4	
Liberal Democrats	Archer	322	25.8	
Majority		192	15.4	
Turnout		1,250	29.0	−4.0

Hatfield East
Party	Candidate	Votes	%	±%
Conservative	Bernard Sarson	833	49.3	
Labour	Melvyn Jones	690	40.9	
Liberal Democrats	Chapman	166	9.8	
Majority		143	8.4	
Turnout		1,689	38.6	−0.2

Hatfield North
Party	Candidate	Votes	%	±%
Labour	Sheila Jones	527	47.1	
Conservative	Morgan	433	38.7	
Liberal Democrats	Fisher	160	14.3	
Majority		94	8.4	
Turnout		1,120	26.4	−2.5

Hatfield South
Party	Candidate	Votes	%	±%
Labour	McDonald	456	59.7	
Conservative	Smith	223	29.2	
Liberal Democrats	Griffiths	85	11.1	
Majority		233	30.5	
Turnout		764	27.6	+0.1

Hatfield West
Party	Candidate	Votes	%	±%
Labour	Wilder	693	47.0	
Conservative	Victoria Sarson	608	41.2	
Liberal Democrats	Pryke	174	11.8	
Majority		85	5.8	
Turnout		1,475	32.6	+0.4

Hollybush
Party	Candidate	Votes	%	±%
Labour	Susan Jones	730	63.3	
Conservative	Peffer	290	25.2	
Liberal Democrats	Cashmore	133	11.5	
Majority		440	38.1	
Turnout		1,153	27.2	−1.3

Howlands
Party	Candidate	Votes	%	±%
Labour	Biddle	759	56.4	
Conservative	Storer	435	32.3	
Liberal Democrats	Philip Edwards	151	11.2	
Majority		324	24.1	
Turnout		1,345	29.6	−3.9

Northaw
Party	Candidate	Votes	%	±%
Conservative	Dean	810	59.5	
National Liberal Party	Cheetham	298	21.9	
Liberal Democrats	Blumsom	135	9.9	
Labour	Parry	119	8.7	
Majority		512	37.6	
Turnout		1,362	32.5	+2.4

Panshanger
Party	Candidate	Votes	%	±%
Conservative	Trigg	805	53.4	
Labour	Chesterman	536	35.6	
Liberal Democrats	Lee	166	11.0	
Majority		269	17.8	
Turnout		1,507	31.4	−0.8

Peartree
Party	Candidate	Votes	%	±%
Labour	Andrew Tinsley	523	59.8	
Conservative	Perkins	241	27.5	
Liberal Democrats	Benakis	111	12.7	
Majority		282	32.3	
Turnout		875	19.1	−2.2

Sherrards
Party	Candidate	Votes	%	±%
Labour	Hurst	977	45.4	
Conservative	Scarff	960	44.7	
Liberal Democrats	Cooke	213	9.9	
Majority		17	0.7	
Turnout		2,150	47.6	−0.1

Welham Green
Party	Candidate	Votes	%	±%
Conservative	Pieri	575	63.3	
Labour	Croft	232	25.5	
Liberal Democrats	Bain	102	11.2	
Majority		343	37.8	
Turnout		909	32.3	−3.4

Welwyn South
Party	Candidate	Votes	%	±%
Conservative	Pile	884	63.5	
Labour	Henderson	292	21.0	
Liberal Democrats	Burnham	216	15.5	
Majority		592	42.5	
Turnout		1,392	32.7	−2.4
