= 1973 Welwyn Hatfield District Council election =

Welwyn Hatfield District Council election

- 7 June 1973

43 out of 43 seats to Welwyn Hatfield District Council 22 seats needed for a majority
- Turnout: 25,214 (38.0%)

	First party	Second party
Party	Labour	Conservative
Last election	N/A	N/A
Seats before	N/A	N/A
Seats after	24	19
Popular vote	38,087	25,523
Percentage	56.4%	37.8%
	Third party	Fourth party
Party	Liberal	Communist
Last election	N/A	N/A
Seats before	N/A	N/A
Seats after	0	0
Popular vote	3,666	309
Percentage	5.4%	0.5%
- Council composition following the election.

The 1973 Welwyn Hatfield District Council election took place on 7 June 1973 to elect members of Welwyn Hatfield District Council in England. This was on the same day as other local elections.

This was the inaugural election of Welwyn Hatfield District Council. The Labour party secured both a majority of the vote and a slim majority of the total seats, with only the Conservatives picking up any other seats on the council. This election is also the only time the Communist Party of Britain has ever contested any seats in Welwyn Hatfield, with one candidate in Haldens ward and another in Peartree ward. Both of them came last in their ward.

== Summary ==
=== Election result ===
1973 Welwyn Hatfield District Council election
Party	Seats	Gains	Losses	Net gain/loss	Seats %	Votes %	Votes	+/−
Labour	24	N/A	N/A	N/A	55.8	56.4	38,087	N/A
Conservative	19	N/A	N/A	N/A	44.2	37.8	25,523	N/A
Liberal	0	N/A	N/A	N/A	0.0	5.4	3,666	N/A
Communist	0	N/A	N/A	N/A	0.0	0.5	309	N/A
