= 2012 Welwyn Hatfield Borough Council election =

2012 UK local government election

Results of the 2012 Welwyn Hatfield Borough Council election

The Welwyn Hatfield Borough Council elections, 2012 were held on 3 May 2012 to elect council members of Welwyn Hatfield Borough Council, the local government authority of Welwyn Hatfield, Hertfordshire, England.

The elections were contested in 16 of the 17 wards. In each ward, one seat was up for election. Welham Green was not contested as it is represented by two councillors and 2012 was not an election year.

== Wards contested ==
The 16 wards contested in the Welwyn Hatfield Borough Council elections were:

- Brookmans Park & Little Heath
- Haldens
- Handside
- Hatfield Central
- Hatfield East
- Hatfield South
- Hatfield Villages
- Hatfield West
- Hollybush
- Howlands
- Northaw and Cuffley
- Panshanger
- Peartree
- Sherrards
- Welwyn East
- Welwyn West

== Election summary ==
Welwyn Hatfield local election result 2012
Party	Seats	Gains	Losses	Net gain/loss	Seats %	Votes %	Votes	+/−
Conservative	8	0	3	-3	50	46.48	10,595	
Labour	6	2	0	+2	37.5	30.24	6,894	
Liberal Democrats	1	0	0	0	6.25	10.71	2,441	
Independent	1	1	0	+1	6.25	2.45	559	
UKIP	0	0	0	0	0	0.65	149	
TUSC	0	0	0	0	0	0.23	53	

== Ward results ==
=== Brookmans Park & Little Heath ===
Brookmans Park & Little Heath Ward Result 3 May 2012
Party	Candidate	Votes	%	±%
Conservative	Stephen Boulton	1,194	71.41	
Labour	Donald Mahon	151	9.03	
UKIP	William Braithwate	149	8.91	
Liberal Democrats	Jenny Blumsom	101	6.04	
Green	John-Paul Rea	77	4.61	
Majority		1,043	62.38	
Turnout		1,672	36.48	
Conservative hold		Swing		

=== Haldens ===
Haldens Ward Result 3 May 2012
Party	Candidate	Votes	%	±%
Labour	Benjamin Yetts	725	49.93	
Conservative	Howard Hughes	508	34.99	
Green	Berenice Dowlen	138	9.50	
Liberal Democrats	Konrad Basch	81	5.58	
Majority		217	14.94	
Turnout		1,452	29.94	
Labour gain from Conservative		Swing		

=== Handside ===
Handside Ward Result 3 May 2012
Party	Candidate	Votes	%	±%
Conservative	Helen Bromley	1,130	48.44	
Liberal Democrats	Bobby Bridgeman	673	28.85	
Labour	Sarah Carthew	354	15.17	
Green	Ian Nendick	176	7.54	
Majority		457	19.59	
Turnout		2,333	43.57	
Conservative hold		Swing		

=== Hatfield Central ===
Hatfield Central Ward Result 3 May 2012
Party	Candidate	Votes	%	±%
Labour	Maureen Cook	653	52.83	
Conservative	Frank Bowron	390	31.55	
Liberal Democrats	Tom Bailey	99	8.01	
Green	Cecile Raw	94	7.61	
Majority		263	21.28	
Turnout		1,236	24.85	
Labour hold		Swing		

=== Hatfield East ===
Hatfield East Ward Result 3 May 2012
Party	Candidate	Votes	%	±%
Conservative	Mick Long	692	47.24	
Labour	Asteroid Thorpe	453	30.92	
Liberal Democrats	Lis Meyland-Smith	138	9.42	
Green	Colin Jeffery	129	8.81	
TUSC	Craig Huteson-Stewart	53	3.62	
Majority		239	16.31	
Turnout		1,465	28.96	
Conservative hold		Swing		

=== Hatfield Villages ===
Hatfield Villages Ward Result 3 May 2012
Party	Candidate	Votes	%	±%
Conservative	Duncan Bell	446	48.96	
Labour	Bridie Croft	250	27.44	
Liberal Democrats	Ayesha Rohale	126	13.83	
Green	Roy Bettles	89	9.77	
Majority		196	21.51	
Turnout		196	21.51	
Conservative hold		Swing		

=== Hatfield South ===
Hatfield South Ward Result 3 May 2012
Party	Candidate	Votes	%	±%
Labour	Keiran Thorpe	545	60.29	
Conservative	Stan Laver-Walton	234	25.88	
Liberal Democrats	Simon Archer	74	8.19	
Green	Noel Taylor	51	5.64	
Majority		311	34.40	
Turnout		904	22.66	
Labour hold		Swing		

=== Hatfield West ===
Hatfield West Ward Result 3 May 2012
Party	Candidate	Votes	%	±%
Labour	Cathy Watson	670	41.46	
Conservative	Nick Atkinson	644	39.85	
Green	Barry Cross	169	10.46	
Liberal Democrats	Hazel Laming	133	8.23	
Majority		26	1.61	
Turnout		1,616	25.71	
Labour gain from Conservative		Swing		

=== Hollybush ===
Hollybush Ward Result 3 May 2012
Party	Candidate	Votes	%	±%
Labour	Lynn Chesterman	678	53.51	
Conservative	Roy Newman	439	34.65	
Liberal Democrats	Gilian Armstrong-Bridges	77	6.08	
Green	Veryan Weston	73	5.76	
Majority		239	18.86	
Turnout		1,267	23.99	
Labour hold		Swing		

=== Howlands ===
Howlands Ward Result 3 May 2012
Party	Candidate	Votes	%	±%
Labour	Alan Chesterman	480	35.48	
Conservative	Stan Tunstall	455	33.63	
Green	Jill Weston	349	25.79	
Liberal Democrats	Lynda Cowan	69	5.10	
Majority		25	1.85	
Turnout		1,353	30.04	
Labour hold		Swing		

=== Northaw & Cuffley ===
Northaw & Cuffley Ward Result 3 May 2012
Party	Candidate	Votes	%	±%
Conservative	Colin Couch	1,023	76.00	
Labour	Mike Alder	133	9.88	
Green	Brian Edwards	127	9.44	
Liberal Democrats	Nigel Bain	63	4.68	
Majority		890	66.12	
Turnout		1,346	31.23	
Conservative hold		Swing		

=== Panshanger ===
Panshanger Ward Result 3 May 2012
Party	Candidate	Votes	%	±%
Conservative	Sara Johnston	709	55.09	
Labour	James Broach	360	27.97	
Green	Mark Knight	143	11.11	
Liberal Democrats	Shirley Shaw	75	5.83	
Majority		349	27.12	
Turnout		1,287	35.68	
Conservative hold		Swing		

=== Peartree ===
Peartree Ward Result 3 May 2012
Party	Candidate	Votes	%	±%
Liberal Democrats	Malcolm Cowan	474	36.69	
Labour	Mark Biddle	469	36.30	
Conservative	Steve Jackson	242	18.73	
Green	Louise Lotz	107	8.28	
Majority		5	0.39	
Turnout		1,292	24.24	
Liberal Democrats hold		Swing		

=== Sherrards ===
Sherrards Ward Result 3 May 2012
Party	Candidate	Votes	%	±%
Conservative	Alan Franey	835	47.96	
Labour	Tony Crump	574	32.97	
Green	Susan Groom	200	11.49	
Liberal Democrats	Jonquil Basch	132	7.58	
Majority		261	14.99	
Turnout		1,741	39.13	
Conservative hold		Swing		

=== Welwyn East ===
Welwyn East Ward Result 3 May 2012
Party	Candidate	Votes	%	±%
Conservative	Julie Cragg	1,144	68.67	
Labour	Shelly Harris	280	16.81	
Liberal Democrats	Edward Walkington	126	7.56	
Green	Adrian Toole	116	6.96	
Majority		864	51.86	
Turnout		1,666	34.72	
Conservative hold		Swing		

=== Welwyn West ===
Welwyn West Ward Result 3 May 2012
Party	Candidate	Votes	%	±%
Independent	Sandra Kyriakides	559	44.51	
Conservative	Paul Smith	510	40.61	
Labour	Margaret White	119	9.47	
Green	William Berrington	68	5.41	
Majority		49	3.90	
Turnout		1,256	38.19	
Independent gain from Conservative		Swing		
