= 2018 Welwyn Hatfield Borough Council election =

2018 UK local government election

- 3 May 2018

19 out of 48 seats to Welwyn Hatfield Borough Council 25 seats needed for a majority
- Turnout: TBD

	First party	Second party	Third party
Party	Conservative	Labour	Liberal Democrats
Last election	28	15	5
Seats before	27 (Note: Following the death of Conservative Councillor Howard Morgan a by-election was held in Hatfield Villages ward on 8th June 2017. This resulted in a gained seat for Labour from the Conservatives by a mere seven votes.)	16	5
Seats won	6	5	5
Seats after	25	15	8
Seat change	▼2	▼1	▲3
Popular vote	11.553	8,770	6,835
Percentage	41.3%	28.9%	24.4%
Swing	▼4.0%	▼0.2%	▲7.5%
- Winner of each seat at the 2018 Welwyn Hatfield Borough Council election.

Elections to Welwyn Hatfield Borough Council took place on 3 May 2018. This was on the same day as other local elections across the United Kingdom. The Conservatives saw a reduction in their number of seats, only just hanging on to majority of the council.

== Composition of the council ==
Prior to the election the composition of the council was:

↓
27	16	5
Conservative	Labour	Liberal Democrats

After the election, the composition of the council was:

↓
25	15	8
Conservative	Labour	Liberal Democrats

== Results summary ==
Welwyn Hatfield Borough Council election, 2018
Party	Seats	Gains	Losses	Net gain/loss	Seats %	Votes %	Votes	+/−
Conservative	25	1	3	▼2		41.3	11,553	▼4.0
Labour	15	1	2	▼1		28.9	8,088	▼0.2
Liberal Democrats	8	3	0	▲3		24.4	6,835	▲7.5
Independent	0	0	0	Steady		4.6	1,403	▲2.6
Abolish the Town Council	0	0	0	Steady		0.7	208	New

== Ward results ==
=== Brookmans Park and Little Heath ===
Brookmans Park and Little Heath
Party	Candidate	Votes	%	±%
Conservative	Rebecca Louise Lass	1,519	75.2	▲4.1
Labour	Graham Martyn Beevers	274	13.6	▼0.3
Liberal Democrats	Louisa Beth Noel	228	11.3	▼3.7
Majority		1,245	61.6	—
Turnout		2,021	39.9	—
Conservative hold		Swing	▲2.2	

=== Haldens ===
Haldens
Party	Candidate	Votes	%	±%
Labour	Lucy Musk	647	34.7	▼3.0
Conservative	Drew Robert Richardson	624	33.5	▼1.9
Liberal Democrats	Anthony Dennis	592	31.8	▲19.9
Majority		23	1.2	—
Turnout		1,863	37.7	—
Labour gain from Conservative		Swing	▼0.6	

=== Handside ===
Handside
Party	Candidate	Votes	%	±%
Liberal Democrats	Siobhan Anne Elam	1,495	56.1	▲20.3
Conservative	Graham Eric Dowler	889	33.4	▼8.8
Labour	Ian Merison	279	10.5	▼5.3
Majority		606	22.7	—
Turnout		2,263	48.9	—
Liberal Democrats hold		Swing	▲14.6	

=== Hatfield Central ===
Hatfield Central
Party	Candidate	Votes	%	±%
Labour	Pankit Shah	756	53.7	▼2.0
Conservative	Caron Anne Juggins	446	31.7	▼0.5
Liberal Democrats	Adam Edwards	205	14.6	▲2.5
Majority		310	22.0	—
Turnout		1,407	26.2	—
Labour hold		Swing	▼0.8	

=== Hatfield East ===
Hatfield East
Party	Candidate	Votes	%	±%
Conservative	Peter Hebden	756	42.8	▲8.8
Labour	Cathy Watson	648	36.7	▲4.8
Liberal Democrats	Jackie Brennan	363	20.5	▲10.5
Majority		108	6.1	—
Turnout		1,767	32.2	—
Conservative gain from Labour		Swing	▲2.0	

=== Hatfield South West ===
Hatfield South West
Party	Candidate	Votes	%	±%
Labour	Kieran Michael Thorpe	679	46.3	▲1.5
Conservative	Kim Elizabeth Langley	382	26.1	▼4.1
Abolish the Town Council	Melvyn Jones	208	14.2	N/A
Liberal Democrats	Paul Graham Wilson	197	13.4	▲2.3
Majority		297	20.2	—
Turnout		1,466	28.8	—
Labour hold		Swing	▲2.8	

=== Hatfield Villages ===
Hatfield Villages
Party	Candidate	Votes	%	±%
Conservative	Duncan James Bell	688	46.0	▼3.9
Conservative	Samuel Kasumu	598	39.9	▼10.0
Labour	Margaret Anne Eames-Peterses	554	37.0	▼0.9
Labour	Oliver Timothy Price	496	33.1	▼4.8
Liberal Democrats	Jane Quinton	212	14.2	▲2.0
Liberal Democrats	Gemma May Louise Moore	205	13.7	▲1.5
Independent	Carol Ann Beckerman	69	4.6	N/A
Majority		44	—	—
Turnout		1,497	29.7	—
Conservative hold		Swing	▼1.6	
Conservative hold		Swing	—	

=== Hollybush ===
Hollybush
Party	Candidate	Votes	%	±%
Labour	Lynn Anne Chesterman	726	53.4	▲14.5
Conservative	Howard Frank Weintrob	475	34.9	▼5.8
Liberal Democrats	Christopher Paul Corbey-West	103	7.6	▲1.5
Independent	George William Saunders	56	4.1	N/A
Majority		251	18.5	—
Turnout		1,360	27.4	—
Labour hold		Swing	▲10.2	

=== Howlands ===
Howlands
Party	Candidate	Votes	%	±%
Labour	Max Peter Holloway	858	52.2	▲16.0
Conservative	Stan Tunstall	629	38.3	▲9.3
Liberal Democrats	Konrad Basch	157	9.5	±0.0
Majority		229	13.9	—
Turnout		1,644	32.3	—
Labour hold		Swing	▲3.4	

=== Northaw and Cuffley ===
Northaw and Cuffley
Party	Candidate	Votes	%	±%
Conservative	Bernard John Sarson	1,152	70.5	▲1.9
Conservative	Simon Anthony Wrenn	1,133	69.3	▲0.7
Liberal Democrats	Robina Helen Durrant	320	19.6	▲1.2
Liberal Democrats	Clive Johnson	240	14.7	▼3.7
Labour	Sheila Ann Barrett	205	12.5	▼0.5
Majority		813	49.7	—
Turnout		1,635	34.1	—
Conservative hold		Swing	▼0.3	
Conservative hold		Swing	—	

=== Panshanger ===
Panshanger
Party	Candidate	Votes	%	±%
Liberal Democrats	Ayesha Rohale	601	37.5	▲22.0
Conservative	Darren Malcolm Bennett	564	35.2	▼10.6
Labour	Zoe Pateman	367	22.9	▲0.6
Independent	Susan Patricia Storer	70	4.4	N/A
Majority		37	2.3	—
Turnout		1,602	35.7	—
Liberal Democrats gain from Conservative		Swing	▲16.3	

=== Peartree ===
Peartree
Party	Candidate	Votes	%	±%
Liberal Democrats	Tamsin Francesca Jackson-Mynott	583	44.0	▲7.9
Labour	Helen Jane Beckett	512	38.7	▲6.6
Conservative	Roy Gilbert Talbot	229	17.3	▼0.8
Majority		71	5.3	—
Turnout		1,324	28.3	—
Liberal Democrats gain from Labour		Swing	▲0.7	

=== Sherrards ===
Sherrards
Party	Candidate	Votes	%	±%
Liberal Democrats	Jean-Paul Bernard Skoczylas	782	38.7	▲25.6
Conservative	Alan Stewart Franey	672	33.3	▼4.9
Labour	Jason Lee Robinson	484	24.0	▼3.1
Independent	Jon Beckerman	82	4.1	N/A
Majority		110	5.4	—
Turnout		2,020	44.8	—
Liberal Democrats gain from Conservative		Swing	▲15.3	

=== Welham Green and Hatfield South ===
Welham Green and Hatfield South
Party	Candidate	Votes	%	±%
Liberal Democrats	Helen Quenet	793	44.8	▼2.9
Liberal Democrats	Jaida Esin Caliskan	692	39.1	▼8.1
Conservative	Teresa Florence Travell	599	33.9	▲1.9
Conservative	Edward Frederick Findlay Boulton	570	32.2	▲0.2
Labour	Linda Elizabeth Mendez	393	22.2	▲1.9
Labour	John Richard Eames-Petersen	364	20.6	▲0.3
Majority		93	5.2	—
Turnout		1,769	33.1	—
Liberal Democrats hold		Swing	▼2.5	
Liberal Democrats hold		Swing		

=== Welwyn East ===
Welwyn East
Party	Candidate	Votes	%	±%
Conservative	Steven Markiewicz	875	47.8	▲1.9
Labour	Rose Grewal	515	28.1	▲5.2
Independent	Carl Jamie Storer	237	12.9	N/A
Liberal Democrats	Helen Natalie Harrington	204	11.1	▼7.8
Majority		360	19.7	—
Turnout		1,831	36.1	—
Conservative hold		Swing	▼1.7	

=== Welwyn West ===
Welwyn West
Party	Candidate	Votes	%	±%
Conservative	Sunny Thusu	1,054	51.9	▲12.2
Independent	Sandra Anne Kyriakides	785	38.7	▲3.5
Labour	Joshua Murombo Chigwangwa	191	9.4	▼2.5
Majority		269	13.2	—
Turnout		2,030	42.3	—
Conservative hold		Swing	▲4.4	

== By-elections ==
=== Welwyn West ===
A by-election was held on 29 November following the death of Mandy Perkins, the leader of the council.

Welwyn West
Party	Candidate	Votes	%	±%
Conservative	Paul Richard Smith	960	58.7	▲6.8
Liberal Democrats	Christina Maria Raven	604	36.9	N/A
Labour	Josh Chigwangwa	72	4.4	▼5.0
Majority		356	21.8	—
Turnout		1,636	33.7	—
Conservative hold		Swing	▼21.9	
