= 2002 Welwyn Hatfield District Council election =

2002 UK local government election

Results of the 2002 Welwyn Hatfield Borough Council election

The 2002 Welwyn Hatfield District Council election took place on 2 May 2002 to elect members of Welwyn Hatfield District Council in Hertfordshire, England. One third of the council was up for election and the Conservative Party gained overall control of the council from the Labour Party.

After the election, the composition of the council was:

- Conservative 26
- Labour 22

== Election result ==
The results saw the Conservatives win a majority of 4 on the council after gaining 3 seats from Labour. The Conservatives gained seats in Hatfield West and Sherrards wards, as well as one of the 2 seats being contested in Hatfield North, where 3 recounts were needed to separate the top 4 candidates who all finished within 17 votes of each other. The Liberal Democrats failed to win any seats, but came second in 4 wards and were within 22 votes of the Conservative winner in Handside ward. Overall turnout in the election was 35.3%, a rise of about 3% on the 2000 election after all voters were able to get postal votes for the first time.

Welwyn Hatfield local election result 2002
Party	Seats	Gains	Losses	Net gain/loss	Seats %	Votes %	Votes	+/−
Conservative	11	3	0	+3	64.7	48.2	12,413	+2.4%
Labour	6	0	3	-3	35.3	34.3	8,827	-4.7%
Liberal Democrats	0	0	0	0	0	17.5	4,506	+4.5%

== Ward results ==
Brookmans Park & Little Heath
Party	Candidate	Votes	%	±%
Conservative	John Dean	1,289	75.9	+0.3
Liberal Democrats	Catherine Edwards	217	12.8	+1.9
Labour	Derek Marcus	192	11.3	−2.2
Majority		1,072	63.1	+1.0
Turnout		1,698		
Conservative hold		Swing		

Haldens
Party	Candidate	Votes	%	±%
Labour	Paul Orrett	760	54.6	−2.5
Conservative	Stuart Jackson	407	29.2	−1.3
Liberal Democrats	Helen Bassett	225	16.2	+3.7
Majority		353	25.4	−1.2
Turnout		1,392		
Labour hold		Swing		

Handside
Party	Candidate	Votes	%	±%
Conservative	Carl Storer	888	41.6	−7.2
Liberal Democrats	Daniel Cooke	866	40.5	+21.5
Labour	Pascal Jacquemain	383	17.9	−4.3
Majority		22	1.1	−25.5
Turnout		2,137		
Conservative hold		Swing		

Hatfield Central
Party	Candidate	Votes	%	±%
Labour	Colin Croft	558	42.6	−2.2
Liberal Democrats	Hazel Laming	470	35.9	+10.1
Conservative	Andrew Peffer	283	21.6	−7.8
Majority		88	6.7	−8.7
Turnout		1,311		
Labour hold		Swing		

Hatfield East
Party	Candidate	Votes	%	±%
Conservative	Peter O'Brien	969	58.1	+8.8
Labour	Margaret White	423	25.4	−15.5
Liberal Democrats	Lis Meyland-Smith	276	16.5	+6.7
Majority		546	32.7	+24.3
Turnout		1,668		
Conservative hold		Swing		

Hatfield North (2)
Party	Candidate	Votes	%	±%
Conservative	Robert Davidson	617		
Labour	Bridgit Croft	609		
Conservative	John Morgan	606		
Labour	Linda Mendez	600		
Liberal Democrats	Richard Griffiths	214		
Liberal Democrats	Maurice Richardson	206		
Turnout		2,852		
Conservative gain from Labour		Swing		
Labour hold		Swing		

Hatfield West
Party	Candidate	Votes	%	±%
Conservative	Nicholas Atkinson	838	50.5	+9.3
Labour	Samuel Smith	625	37.7	−9.3
Liberal Democrats	Simon Archer	195	11.8	0.0
Majority		213	12.8	
Turnout		1,658		
Conservative gain from Labour		Swing		

Hollybush
Party	Candidate	Votes	%	±%
Labour	Margaret Birleson	780	60.2	−3.1
Conservative	Marian Pile	356	27.5	+2.3
Liberal Democrats	Janet Gammage	160	12.3	+0.8
Majority		424	32.7	−5.4
Turnout		1,296		
Labour hold		Swing		

Howlands
Party	Candidate	Votes	%	±%
Labour	Alan Chesterman	780	53.4	−3.0
Conservative	John Burnapp	468	32.0	−0.3
Liberal Democrats	Jonathan Arch	214	14.6	+3.4
Majority		312	21.4	−2.7
Turnout		1,462		
Labour hold		Swing		

Northaw
Party	Candidate	Votes	%	±%
Conservative	John Nicholls	1,196	79.6	+20.1
Liberal Democrats	Philip Edwards	162	10.8	+0.9
Labour	Brenda Marcus	145	9.6	+0.9
Majority		1,034	68.8	+31.2
Turnout		1,503		
Conservative hold		Swing		

Panshanger
Party	Candidate	Votes	%	±%
Conservative	Russell Le Page	837	50.9	−2.5
Labour	Julia Harrison	486	29.6	−6.0
Liberal Democrats	Ted Naseby	321	19.5	+8.5
Majority		351	21.3	+3.5
Turnout		1,644		
Conservative hold		Swing		

Peartree
Party	Candidate	Votes	%	±%
Labour	Jacqueline Russell	637	59.1	−0.7
Conservative	David Perkins	242	22.5	−5.0
Liberal Democrats	Gillian Armstrong-Bridges	198	18.4	+5.7
Majority		395	36.6	+4.3
Turnout		1,077		
Labour hold		Swing		

Sherrards
Party	Candidate	Votes	%	±%
Conservative	John Scarff	1,074	47.0	+2.3
Labour	Lynn Chesterman	967	42.4	−3.0
Liberal Democrats	Louise Lotz	242	10.6	+0.7
Majority		107	4.6	
Turnout		2,283		
Conservative gain from Labour		Swing		

Welham Green
Party	Candidate	Votes	%	±%
Conservative	Patricia Storey	622	63.3	0.0
Labour	Margaret Toch	225	22.9	−2.6
Liberal Democrats	Nigel Bain	136	13.8	+2.6
Majority		397	40.4	+2.6
Turnout		983		
Conservative hold		Swing		

Welwyn North
Party	Candidate	Votes	%	±%
Conservative	Margaret Scarff	719	63.5	
Labour	Jan Burnell	216	19.1	
Liberal Democrats	David Bartlett	198	17.5	
Majority		503	44.4	
Turnout		1,133		
Conservative hold		Swing		

Welwyn South
Party	Candidate	Votes	%	±%
Conservative	Amanda Perkins	1,002	60.8	−2.7
Labour	Julia Henderson	441	26.7	+5.7
Liberal Democrats	Ian Skidmore	206	12.5	−3.0
Majority		561	34.1	−8.4
Turnout		1,649		
Conservative hold		Swing		
