= 1999 Welwyn Hatfield District Council election =

1999 UK local government election

The 1999 Welwyn Hatfield District Council election took place on 6 May 1999 to elect members of Welwyn Hatfield District Council in Hertfordshire, England. The whole council was up for election with boundary changes since the last election in 1998 increasing the number of seats by one. The Conservative party gained overall control of the council from the Labour party. Overall turnout in the election was 33.09%.

After the election, the composition of the council was

- Conservative 24
- Labour 21
- Vacant 3

== Election result ==
Welwyn Hatfield local election result 1999
Party	Seats	Gains	Losses	Net gain/loss	Seats %	Votes %	Votes	+/−
Conservative	24			+4	53.3			
Labour	21			-3	46.7			
