= Grade II* listed buildings in Welwyn Hatfield =

There are over 20,000 Grade II* listed buildings in England. This page is a list of these buildings in the district of Welwyn Hatfield in Hertfordshire.

== Welwyn Hatfield ==
| Name | Location | Type | Completed (Note: The date given is the date used by Historic England as significant for the initial building or that of an important part in the structure's description.) | Date designated | Grid ref. (Note: Sometimes known as OSGB36, the grid reference is based on the British national grid reference system used by the Ordnance Survey.) Geo-coordinates | Entry number (Note: The "List Entry Number" is a unique number assigned to each listed building and scheduled monument by Historic England.) | Image |
|---|---|---|---|---|---|---|---|
| Ayot House | Ayot St Lawrence, Welwyn Hatfield | House | Early-mid 18th century | 24 January 1967 | TL1946616987; 51°50′19″N 0°16′03″W | 1348107 | Ayot House More images |
| Old St Lawrence Church | Ayot St. Lawrence, Welwyn Hatfield | Church | 12th century | 24 January 1967 | TL1947616878; 51°50′16″N 0°16′02″W | 1101088 | Old St Lawrence Church More images |
| Shaw's Corner | Ayot St. Lawrence, Welwyn Hatfield | House | c. 1900 | 24 January 1967 | TL1939416657; 51°50′09″N 0°16′07″W | 1348110 | Shaw's Corner More images |
| Church of St Mary the Virgin | Essendon, Welwyn Hatfield | Church | 15th century | 30 March 1966 | TL2735708763; 51°45′47″N 0°09′21″W | 1101071 | Church of St Mary the Virgin More images |
| Bridge over the Lake at Brocket Hall | Lemsford, Hatfield, Welwyn Hatfield | Bridge | 1772-4 | 30 March 1966 | TL2146412590; 51°47′56″N 0°14′24″W | 1173560 | Bridge over the Lake at Brocket Hall More images |
| Gatehouse to Hatfield House with Porter's Lodge and the 2 Adjoining Cottages on the South | Old Hatfield, Hatfield, Welwyn Hatfield | Lodge | c. 1480 | 30 March 1966 | TL2354708487; 51°45′41″N 0°12′40″W | 1173164 | Gatehouse to Hatfield House with Porter's Lodge and the 2 Adjoining Cottages on the South More images |
| Gates, lodges and Screen Wall at South-east Entrance to Brocket Hall | Lemsford, Hatfield, Welwyn Hatfield | Gate | c. 1765 | 9 December 1983 | TL2162612119; 51°47′40″N 0°14′16″W | 1101030 | Gates, lodges and Screen Wall at South-east Entrance to Brocket Hall More images |
| Goodrich House | Old Hatfield, Hatfield, Welwyn Hatfield | House | Late 18th century | 3 April 1951 | TL2348608547; 51°45′43″N 0°12′44″W | 1296264 | Goodrich House More images |
| Hatfield War Memorial | Old Hatfield, Hatfield, Welwyn Hatfield | War memorial | 1921 | 16 May 2017 | TL2330508786; 51°45′51″N 0°12′53″W | 1445906 | Hatfield War Memorial More images |
| Hill House | Old Hatfield, Hatfield, Welwyn Hatfield | Double House | c. 1800 | 3 April 1951 | TL2346608730; 51°45′49″N 0°12′44″W | 1348182 | Hill House |
| The Flight Test Hangar, Offices, Fire Station and Control Tower, British Aerospace | Hatfield, Welwyn Hatfield | Fire Station | 1954 | 21 September 1998 | TL2127308842; 51°45′54″N 0°14′39″W | 1376561 | Upload Photo |
| The Old Mill House Museum and Mill Green Mill | Mill Green, Hatfield, Welwyn Hatfield | Mill House | 17th century and earlier | 2 September 1977 | TL2400109774; 51°46′22″N 0°12′15″W | 1101037 | The Old Mill House Museum and Mill Green Mill More images |
| The Temple, Brocket Hall | Lemsford, Hatfield, Welwyn Hatfield | Garden Temple | Mid-late 18th century | 30 March 1966 | TL2123413062; 51°48′11″N 0°14′35″W | 1100988 | Upload Photo |
| Torilla | Hatfield, Welwyn Hatfield | House | 1934-5 | 23 April 1993 | TL2065207818; 51°45′22″N 0°15′12″W | 1348145 | Upload Photo |
| Church of St Mary the Virgin | North Mymms, Welwyn Hatfield | Church | 14th century | 30 March 1966 | TL2212704445; 51°43′32″N 0°14′00″W | 1100951 | Church of St Mary the Virgin More images |
| Moffats Farmhouse | Brookmans Park, North Mymms, Welwyn Hatfield | House | C16/17 | 30 March 1966 | TL2485904146; 51°43′20″N 0°11′38″W | 1348175 | Upload Photo |
| The Folly Arch | Brookmans Park (see section), North Mymms | Gate | c. 1740 | 6 February 1952 | TL2545803028; 51°42′43″N 0°11′08″W | 1100984 | The Folly Arch More images |
| Northaw Place | Northaw, Northaw and Cuffley, Welwyn Hatfield | House | c. 1690 | 6 February 1952 | TL2700002465; 51°42′24″N 0°09′48″W | 1100972 | Northaw Place More images |
| Parish Church of St Thomas a Becket | Northaw, Northaw and Cuffley, Welwyn Hatfield | Church | 1809 | 9 December 1983 | TL2792202312; 51°42′18″N 0°09′01″W | 1348170 | Parish Church of St Thomas a Becket More images |
| The Dower House | Northaw, Northaw and Cuffley, Welwyn Hatfield | House | Early 19th century | 30 March 1966 | TL2710302259; 51°42′17″N 0°09′43″W | 1348167 | Upload Photo |
| Guessens | Welwyn, Welwyn Hatfield | House | c. 1730 | 24 January 1967 | TL2305716294; 51°49′54″N 0°12′56″W | 1100961 | Upload Photo |
| Sherardswood School, Lockleys | Welwyn, Welwyn Hatfield | Country House | 1717 | 24 January 1967 | TL2369415941; 51°49′42″N 0°12′23″W | 1100925 | Upload Photo |
| Welwyn Railway Viaduct (Digswell Viaduct) | Welwyn, Welwyn Hatfield | Railway Viaduct | 1848-50 | 4 November 1980 | TL2452514852; 51°49′06″N 0°11′41″W | 1348122 | Welwyn Railway Viaduct (Digswell Viaduct) More images |
| Templewood Primary School | Welwyn Hatfield | Elementary School | 1950 | 30 March 1993 | TL2355813885; 51°48′36″N 0°12′33″W | 1101085 | Templewood Primary School More images |
