= 2026 Welwyn Hatfield Borough Council election =

2026 English local government election

- 7 May 2026

17 out of 48 seats to Welwyn Hatfield Borough Council (including 1 by-election) 25 seats needed for a majority
	First party	Second party	Third party
Leader	Rose Grewal	Sandreni Bonfante	Tony Kingsbury
Party	Labour	Liberal Democrats	Conservative
Leader's seat	Hatfield Villages; No election	Welham Green and Hatfield South	Welwyn West; No election
Last election	20 seats, 31.8%	16 seats, 21.4%	12 seats, 33.9%
Seats before	17	15	12 (Note: Including the vacant seat in Welwyn East last held by a Conservative.)
Seats won	3	6	5
Seats after	16	15	12
Seat change	▼1	Steady	Steady
Percentage	15.9%	19.8%	23.3%
Swing	▼16.2%	▼1.6%	▼10.6%
	Fourth party	Fifth party
Leader		Larry Crofton
Party	Reform	Green
Leader's seat		Hatfield East (Lost seat)
Last election	Did not stand	0 seats, 9.5%
Seats before	0	2
Seats won	3	0
Seats after	3	0
Seat change	▲3	▼2
Percentage	27.4%	13.5%
Swing	▲24.1%	▲4.0%
- Winner of each seat at the 2026 Welwyn Hatfield Borough Council election.
Leader before election
Rose Grewal
Labour
No overall control
Leader after election
Rose Grewal
Labour
No overall control

The 2026 Welwyn Hatfield Borough Council election was held on 7 May 2026 to elect members to Welwyn Hatfield Borough Council in Hertfordshire, England, taking place on the same day as other local elections. 16 of the council's 48 seats were up for election, with an additional 17th seat being contested in Welwyn East due to a by-election. The election was originally cancelled in January 2026 in preparation for structural changes to local government, however, the government reversed its decision the following month. This election was the last held in Welwyn Hatfield before local government reorganisation.

Prior to the election the council was under no overall control, being run by a joint Labour and Liberal Democrats administration, led by Labour councillor Rose Grewal. The council remained under no overall control following the election and Labour and the Liberal Democrats continued their joint administration, again led by Rose Grewal.

While most of the seats contested were held by their original parties, Reform won three seats, joining the council for the first time. This included winning the Hollybush ward, the seat of the Mayor, Lynn Chesterman. The Green Party lost both their incumbent seats, meaning they were no longer represented in the council.

== Background ==
In the 2024 local elections, the Labour Party won 8 seats while the Liberal Democrats and Conservative Party won 4 seats each, maintaining no overall control of the council. The Liberal Democrats and Labour had formed a coalition after the 2023 election, though, following the 2024 election, Labour overtook the Liberal Democrats and became the main party in the coalition, with Labour councillor Max Holloway of Howlands being appointed leader of the council. In the 2024 general election, the constituency of Welwyn Hatfield was won by the Labour Party candidate Andrew Lewin, who unseated defence secretary and 19-year Conservative incumbent Grant Shapps, while the Hertsmere constituency (which includes the Northaw and Cuffley ward of Welwyn Hatfield borough) was held by Conservative Oliver Dowden, the former deputy prime minister under Rishi Sunak.

There were two by-elections held between the 2024 and 2026 elections, both held in conjunction with the 2025 Hertfordshire County Council election:

By-elections
Ward	Date	Incumbent		Winner		Cause	Ref.
Ward	Date	Party	Councillor	Party	Candidate	Cause	Ref.
Brookmans Park and Little Heath	1 May 2025	Conservative	Jonathan Boulton	Conservative	Fiona Thomson	Resignation	
Peartree	1 May 2025	Liberal Democrats	Simon Goldwater	Liberal Democrats	Fauzia Haider	Resignation	

In January 2025, councillor Sunny Thusu of Welwyn West was suspended from the Conservative Party after it was revealed that he had cheated on his medical school exams in 2023. He subsequently sat as an independent, though his suspension was lifted in June 2025. In May 2025, councillor Larry Crofton of Hatfield East left the Labour Party and joined the Green Party, citing disagreements with the national Labour government. In August 2025, councillor Jill Weston of Howlands left Labour to sit as an independent after disagreements over the Labour government's position on the Gaza war. In January 2026, councillor Lucy Musk of Haldens left Labour and joined the Green Party over disagreements with Keir Starmer's Labour government. That month, Conservative councillor Roger Trigg of Welwyn East died, leaving the seat vacant.

On 15 January 2026, the council held a non-binding vote on whether to cancel the 2026 elections in preparation for local government reorganisation, with a binding cabinet vote after the full council meeting. The full council voted 24–15 against cancellation, but the cabinet voted 4–3 for cancellation, with the Labour councillors in the cabinet voting for and the Liberal Democrat councillors voting against. Following the cabinet vote, the Liberal Democrats withdrew from their coalition agreement with Labour, with Liberal Democrat leader Jane Quinton accusing Labour of a "betrayal of democracy". The election was formally cancelled by Steve Reed, the secretary of state for local government, on 22 January. On 29 January, following criticism from other parties, Labour leader of the council Max Holloway of Howlands announced he would be standing down as leader on 6 February, when a new leader would be elected. In February 2026, Labour councillor Rose Grewal of Hatfield Villages was elected as the new leader of the council to replace Holloway, with a tentative new coalition agreement with the Liberal Democrats in the final stages of negotiation. That same month, the government announced that all cancelled elections in England, including Welwyn Hatfield, were to go ahead following a legal challenge by Reform UK. On 16 February, councillor Jane Quinton of Panshanger announced that she would be standing down as deputy leader of the council and leader of the council's Liberal Democrat group. She was replaced in both roles by councillor Sandreni Bonfante of Welham Green and Hatfield South. In March 2026, councillor Russ Platt of Peartree left the Liberal Democrats to sit as an independent, stating that he could not "sit comfortably" in a joint administration with Labour following their attempted cancellation of the May elections.

=== Previous council composition ===
After 2024 election		Before 2026 election	
Party	Seats	Party	Seats
Labour	20	Labour	17
Liberal Democrats	16	Liberal Democrats	15
Conservative	12	Conservative	11
Green	0	Green	2
Independent	0	Independent	2
Vacant	—N/a	Vacant	1

==== Changes ====
- January 2025: Sunny Thusu (Conservative, Welwyn West) was suspended from the Conservatives after it was revealed that he cheated on his medical school exams in 2023.
- May 2025: Larry Crofton (Labour, Hatfield East) left Labour and joined the Green Party.
- June 2025: Sunny Thusu (Independent, Welwyn West) had his suspension lifted and was readmitted to the Conservative group on the council.
- August 2025: Jill Weston (Labour, Howlands) left Labour to sit as an independent after disagreements over the Labour government's position on the Gaza war.
- January 2026: Lucy Musk (Labour, Haldens) left Labour and joined the Green Party; Roger Trigg (Conservative, Welwyn East) died.
- March 2026: Russ Platt (Liberal Democrat, Peartree) left the Liberal Democrats to sit as an independent after disagreements over the Labour and Liberal Democrat joint administration's position on cancelling the May local elections.

== Election result ==
2026 Welwyn Hatfield Borough Council election
Party	This election				Full council			This election		
Party	Candidates	Seats	Net	Seats %	Other	Total	Total %	Votes	Votes %	+/−
Labour	17	3	▼1	17.6	13	16	33.3	5,785	15.9	-16.2
Liberal Democrats	17	6	Steady	35.3	9	15	31.2	7,215	19.8	-1.6
Conservative	17	5	Steady	29.4	7	12	25.0	8,470	23.3	-10.6
Reform	17	3	▲3	17.6	0	3	6.3	9,984	27.4	+24.1
Independent	0	0	Steady	0.0	2	2	4.2	N/A (Note: Did not stand candidates.)	N/A	N/A
Green	17	0	▼2	0.0	0	0	0.0	4,926	13.5	+4.0
Heritage	1	0	Steady	0.0	0	0	0.0	12	0.0	N/A

== Ward results ==
The results of the elections were announced the day after voting, 8 May.

=== Brookmans Park & Little Heath ===
Brookmans Park & Little Heath
Party	Candidate	Votes	%	±%
Conservative	Craig Stanbury	1,119	45.9	–13.0
Reform	Graham Carpenter	666	27.3	+20.5
Green	Stephanie Mabbutt	326	13.4	+8.2
Labour	Sheila Barrett	171	7.0	–14.3
Liberal Democrats	Anthony Green	144	5.9	–1.9
Heritage	Mia Molinaro	12	0.5	N/A
Majority		453	18.6	–19.0
Turnout		2,443	48.7	+13.1
Registered electors		5,013		
Conservative hold		Swing	▼16.8	

=== Haldens ===
Haldens
Party	Candidate	Votes	%	±%
Reform	John Redmond	632	28.9	N/A
Labour	Sarah Ellingworth	513	23.5	–24.2
Liberal Democrats	Elena Protic	425	19.4	+4.2
Green	Lucy Musk*	326	14.9	+6.7
Conservative	Alastair Hellyer	290	13.3	–15.6
Majority		119	5.4	N/A
Turnout		2,190	44.4	+12.5
Registered electors		4,932		
Reform gain from Green				

=== Handside ===
Handside
Party	Candidate	Votes	%	±%
Liberal Democrats	Gemma Moore*	1,330	47.8	+4.1
Reform	Jane Johnson	541	19.4	+15.4
Conservative	Jane Lowe	445	16.0	–17.9
Green	Caleb Harrison	251	9.0	+3.5
Labour	Stephen Plume	216	7.8	–5.1
Majority		789	28.4	+18.6
Turnout		2,791	52.0	+5.8
Registered electors		5,368		
Liberal Democrats hold		Swing	▼5.7	

=== Hatfield Central ===
Hatfield Central
Party	Candidate	Votes	%	±%
Reform	Mark Smith	565	33.3	+23.2
Labour	Pankit Shah*	488	28.8	–19.4
Green	Andy Phillipson	265	15.6	+7.7
Conservative	David Perkins	230	13.6	–10.9
Liberal Democrats	Ilie Dumitru	147	8.7	–0.6
Majority		77	4.5	N/A
Turnout		1,706	31.2	+6.0
Registered electors		5,471		
Reform gain from Labour		Swing	▲21.3	

=== Hatfield East ===
Hatfield East
Party	Candidate	Votes	%	±%
Labour	Vaishali Shah	547	24.8	–17.5
Reform	Michael Southwell	512	23.2	N/A
Green	Larry Crofton*	448	20.3	+11.8
Conservative	David Rose	433	19.6	–12.6
Liberal Democrats	Jacqueline Brennan	268	12.1	–4.9
Majority		35	1.6	–8.5
Turnout		2,214	38.6	+5.5
Registered electors		5,729		
Labour gain from Green				

=== Hatfield South West ===
Hatfield South West
Party	Candidate	Votes	%	±%
Liberal Democrats	Lukasz Stasiowski	596	32.5	+4.8
Reform	Claudiu Imbir	492	26.9	N/A
Green	Georgia Swift	280	15.3	+11.2
Labour	Kamal Hussain	257	14.0	–30.5
Conservative	Negar Cetin	207	11.3	–12.4
Majority		104	5.6	N/A
Turnout		1,835	30.9	+1.2
Registered electors		5,937		
Liberal Democrats hold				

=== Hatfield Villages ===
Hatfield Villages
Party	Candidate	Votes	%	±%
Labour	James Broach*	622	30.2	–11.4
Reform	Pete Whitehead	544	26.4	N/A
Conservative	Abbie Cook	395	19.2	–15.0
Green	Andreas Kukol	334	16.2	+10.1
Liberal Democrats	John Edwards	166	8.1	–10.0
Majority		78	3.8	–3.6
Turnout		2,068	33.5	+6.1
Registered electors		6,168		
Labour hold				

=== Hollybush ===
Hollybush
Party	Candidate	Votes	%	±%
Reform	Callum Powell	575	33.1	+23.4
Labour	Lynn Chesterman*	547	31.5	–20.7
Conservative	David Glickman	273	15.7	–8.2
Green	Esther Saurigny	235	13.5	+6.1
Liberal Democrats	Maria Siewniak	107	6.2	–0.6
Majority		28	1.6	N/A
Turnout		1,744	35.5	+9.8
Registered electors		4,917		
Reform gain from Labour		Swing	▲22.1	

=== Howlands ===
Howlands
Party	Candidate	Votes	%	±%
Labour	Max Holloway*	764	35.6	–14.0
Reform	Mark Biddle	746	34.7	+25.5
Conservative	Jamal Chowdhuri	259	12.1	–15.5
Green	Bradley Taylor	257	12.0	+4.6
Liberal Democrats	Issac Martindale	122	5.7	–0.5
Majority		18	0.9	–21.1
Turnout		2,150	40.7	+11.0
Registered electors		5,287		
Labour hold		Swing	▼19.8	

=== Northaw & Cuffley ===
Northaw & Cuffley
Party	Candidate	Votes	%	±%
Conservative	Brian Seeger	1,175	52.5	–8.1
Reform	Danny Brunt	688	30.8	N/A
Green	Ian Gregory	160	7.2	–4.5
Liberal Democrats	Peter Basford	117	5.2	–3.2
Labour	Laura Cook	97	4.3	–15.0
Majority		487	21.7	–19.6
Turnout		2,243	47.5	+6.2
Registered electors		4,726		
Conservative hold				

=== Panshanger ===
Panshanger
Party	Candidate	Votes	%	±%
Liberal Democrats	Lewis Ross	655	34.2	–3.9
Reform	Steve Green	631	32.9	N/A
Conservative	Marios Artemi	236	12.3	–20.3
Green	Alice Cowley-French	222	11.6	+4.4
Labour	Andy Osborne	172	9.0	–13.1
Majority		24	1.3	–4.2
Turnout		1,919	43.9	+11.2
Registered electors		4,370		
Liberal Democrats hold				

=== Peartree ===
Peartree
Party	Candidate	Votes	%	±%
Liberal Democrats	Duncan Jones*	701	39.9	–3.4
Reform	Ian Colpitts	486	27.7	N/A
Green	Tanya Dickson	288	16.4	+8.2
Labour	Darren Lewis	187	10.7	–25.6
Conservative	Emil Sohrab	93	5.3	–6.9
Majority		215	12.2	N/A
Turnout		1,760	31.5	+5.4
Registered electors		5,581		
Liberal Democrats hold				

=== Sherrards ===
Sherrards
Party	Candidate	Votes	%	±%
Liberal Democrats	Jean-Paul Skoczylas*	994	44.3	+13.7
Reform	Tommy Howgego	488	21.7	+15.2
Conservative	Teresa Travell	299	13.3	–11.4
Green	Philip Hopley	251	11.2	+4.6
Labour	Sarah Dolton	212	9.4	–22.1
Majority		506	22.6	N/A
Turnout		2,250	50.8	+6.7
Registered electors		4,426		
Liberal Democrats hold		Swing	▼0.8	

=== Welham Green & Hatfield South ===
Welham Green & Hatfield South
Party	Candidate	Votes	%	±%
Liberal Democrats	Sandy Bonfante*	692	33.7	–7.9
Reform	Vhalan Anandarajah	631	30.7	N/A
Conservative	Michael Taylor	358	17.4	–17.9
Green	Joshua Hook	199	9.7	+5.7
Labour	Perry Hewitt	175	8.5	–10.7
Majority		61	3.0	–3.3
Turnout		2,062	38.6	+6.6
Registered electors		5,345		
Liberal Democrats hold				

=== Welwyn East ===
Welwyn East (2 seats due to by-election)
Party	Candidate	Votes	%	±%
Conservative	Claire Hunt	883	37.6	–2.4
Conservative	Durk Reyner	788	33.6	–6.4
Reform	Mark Castle	607	25.9	+18.1
Reform	John Robinson	514	21.9	+14.1
Green	William Berrington	365	15.5	+6.3
Labour	Peter Costello	344	14.7	–15.5
Green	Andrew Morrison	339	14.4	+5.2
Liberal Democrats	David Bartlett	319	13.6	+0.7
Labour	George von Bülow	276	11.8	–18.4
Liberal Democrats	Jason Payne	261	11.1	–1.8
Turnout		2,484	49.3	+11.4
Registered electors		5,041		
Conservative hold				
Conservative hold				

=== Welwyn West ===
Welwyn West
Party	Candidate	Votes	%	±%
Conservative	Sunny Thusu*	987	41.1	–2.5
Reform	Richard Armstrong	666	27.7	N/A
Green	David Cox	380	15.8	–27.0
Labour	Rosalind Cloke	197	8.2	–1.9
Liberal Democrats	Jojo Godfrey	171	7.1	+3.6
Majority		321	13.4	+12.6
Turnout		2,409	49.1	+10.6
Registered electors		4,910		
Conservative hold				
