= Mill Green Museum =

Local museum in Hatfield, England

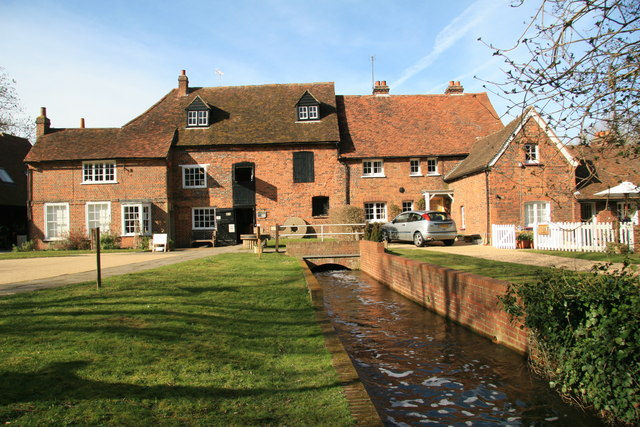
- Mill Green Museum

- Location within Hertfordshire
- 51°46′23″N 0°12′15″W
- Type: Watermill
- Location: Hatfield
- OS grid reference: TL 24001 09774

History
- Built: 17th century

Site notes
- Area: Hertfordshire
- Owner: Welwyn Hatfield Borough Council

Listed Building – Grade II*
- Official name: The Old Mill House Museum and Mill Green Mill
- Designated: 2 September 1977
- Reference no.: 1101037

Mill Green Museum is a working watermill in Hatfield, Hertfordshire, England. The building is Grade II* listed and dates from the 17th century. The local museum is in the old miller's house. Three galleries show changing displays of art and local history.

== History ==
The mill uses the power of the River Lea. The Domesday Book records four mills near Hatfield, which were owned by the Bishop of Ely. The current building is from the 1700s, but there has been milling on the site for at least 1000 years. In 1277 there were two mills recorded on the site, but by 1436 there was only one in working condition. In 1482 and 1484 millers were prosecuted for stealing grain.

In the 1600s the mill came under the possession of the Earls of Salisbury, who owned Hatfield House. The millhouse is from the same century, and the majority of the mill building is from the 1800s. They then rented the site to the Bigg family from 1726, by which time there were many mills on the site, producing flour and paper, in addition to a brewhouse. Is is from around this time that the mill equipment originates. The connection with the Bigg family, which was the mill's most successful period, ended when a family member gambled away all of their money in 1824. Milling came to an end in 1911. It was made Grade II* listed in 1977, opened as a museum in 1979, and restored to full working condition in 1986.

== Access ==
The mill is managed by Welwyn Hatfield Borough Council. Visitors can explore the mill, see it working and chat to the miller on duty. Mill Green runs craft and baking workshops, children's activities and a school visit service.

== See also ==
- Grade II* listed buildings in Welwyn Hatfield
- List of museums in Hertfordshire
- List of watermills in the United Kingdom
