= Northaw Place =

Building in Hertfordshire, England

Coordinates: 51°42′24″N 0°09′48″W

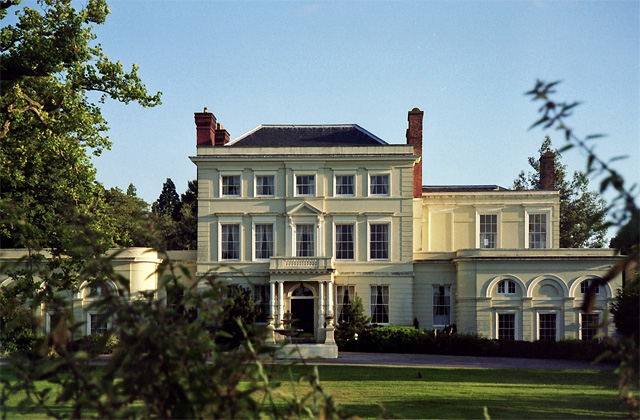
Northaw Place

Northaw Place is a Grade II* listed former mansion house, later a school and children's home, in Northaw and Cuffley, Hertfordshire, England. Northaw Place was built circa 1690 by Sir George Hutchins, King's Serjeant and one of the Commissioners of the Great Seal (1690–1693). Cussans describes the Northaw estate as having once formed part of the manorial estate but it became detached from it in circa 1690 when Sir William Leman, second Baronet, and Lord of the Manor of Northaw, gave it to his daughter Sarah, on her marriage to Sir George Hutchins. It remained in private hands until the late 19th century, when it was converted into a school. It reverted to private ownership again in 1927, only to be purchased by Middlesex County Council after World War II and converted into a children's home. With the 1974 re-organisation of UK local government it passed to the London Borough of Haringey who used it as a Children's Assessment Centre until late 1979. In 1980 a planning application was made to convert Northaw Place (and its adjoining extensions to the west) to 10 dwellings (Ref: S6/0369/80). Permission was granted but the scheme was not implemented due to outstanding conditions of consent. A subsequent application to convert Northaw Place to offices was refused in 1982 (S6/0120/82). Another application was submitted in 1985 to convert Northaw Place to six dwellings (S6/0368/LB), and permission was granted. In 1986 Northaw Place was bought by Hitchins (Hatfield) Ltd, and a new planning application was submitted. This contained minor amendments from the previous application. As part of the conversion work the main house was divided from the stables / coach house to the west by the demolition of a link building. It has since been converted to residential accommodation.

== Paintings ==
The staircase dates to c. 1700 and the entrance hall contains a number of wall and ceiling paintings, tempera on plaster, in the style of Verrio, depicting scenes from classical mythology. Other art historians have attributed the paintings to James Thornhill and Maria Verelst. Croft-Murray has dated the paintings to 1728–32. The (west) right-hand wall has a scene depicting the ‘Judgement of Paris’ in its upper part; below this is a frieze of sculpted figures and a trompe l’oeil painting of a statue of Venus and Cupid, Venus having accepted the golden apple from Paris. Adjacent to this is a grisaille panel containing a sculpted figure. The (south) window wall has cherubs pulling aside curtains on either side of the window. Below the window is the coat of arms of Captain Mounsey, who purchased Northaw Place in 1867. He had the paintings ‘restored’ in 1869 by Manfred Griffin Holyoake, an established paintings restorer; it is likely the Mounsey coat of arms was added at this time. The left (east) wall depicts a holy figure, a king and a satyr (scene not identified). There are further figures in the background. The north wall has a cornucopia each side and painted mouldings. There are roundels containing figures above the east and west doors on the landing. The ceiling has a scene depicting the muses of music and painting, topped by a putti crowning a figure bearing a golden lyre. During its years as a Children's Home and Assessment Centre, these paintings were covered over with ventilated boards for their protection.

== Residents ==
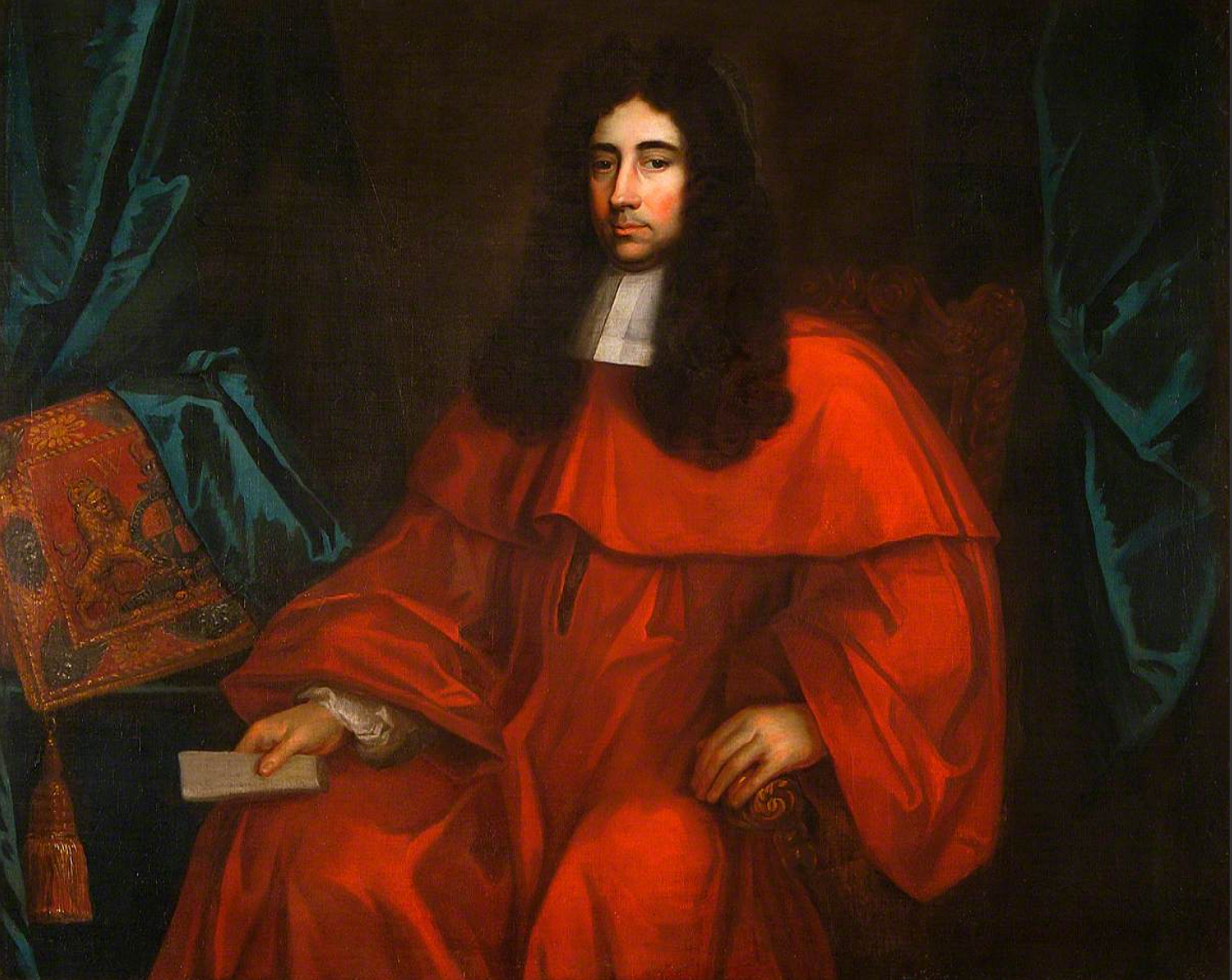
Sir George Hutchins

Sir George Hutchins built Northaw Place in about 1697. The property was a wedding gift from Sir William Leman the father of his new bride Sarah Leman. Sir George was a wealthy, high-profile lawyer in the reign of Charles II. In the late 1670s he was employed as counsel in many cases before the House of Lords. In 1689 he was knighted by William III soon after becoming King's serjeant. He was married twice. His first wife died in 1695 leaving two daughters. In 1697 he married Sarah Leman and the Northaw property came to the Hutchins family. When Sir George died in 1705 their only son Leman Hutchins inherited the house.

Leman Hutchins was responsible for commissioning the earlier paintings in Northaw Place. In 1723 he inherited a large amount of property from his cousins including the Manor of Upwood. In 1837 he married Mary Williams and in the following year at the age of 38 he died leaving all of his property to her.

Mary Williams remarried in 1745. Her new husband was Vere Warner an attorney who assisted her with the administration of her large fortune. He died in 1756 and it appears that in about 1760 she bequeathed her property to her niece Mary Anne Hussey. Mary Anne had married in 1758 Sir Richard Bickerton, 1st Baronet and so Northaw Place came under his ownership. Mary Warner continued to live at Upwood where she died in 1771. There is a memorial plaque in her honour at St Peter's Church Upwood. Several years after her death in 1775 Sir Richard Bickerton sold Northaw Place to John Pope.

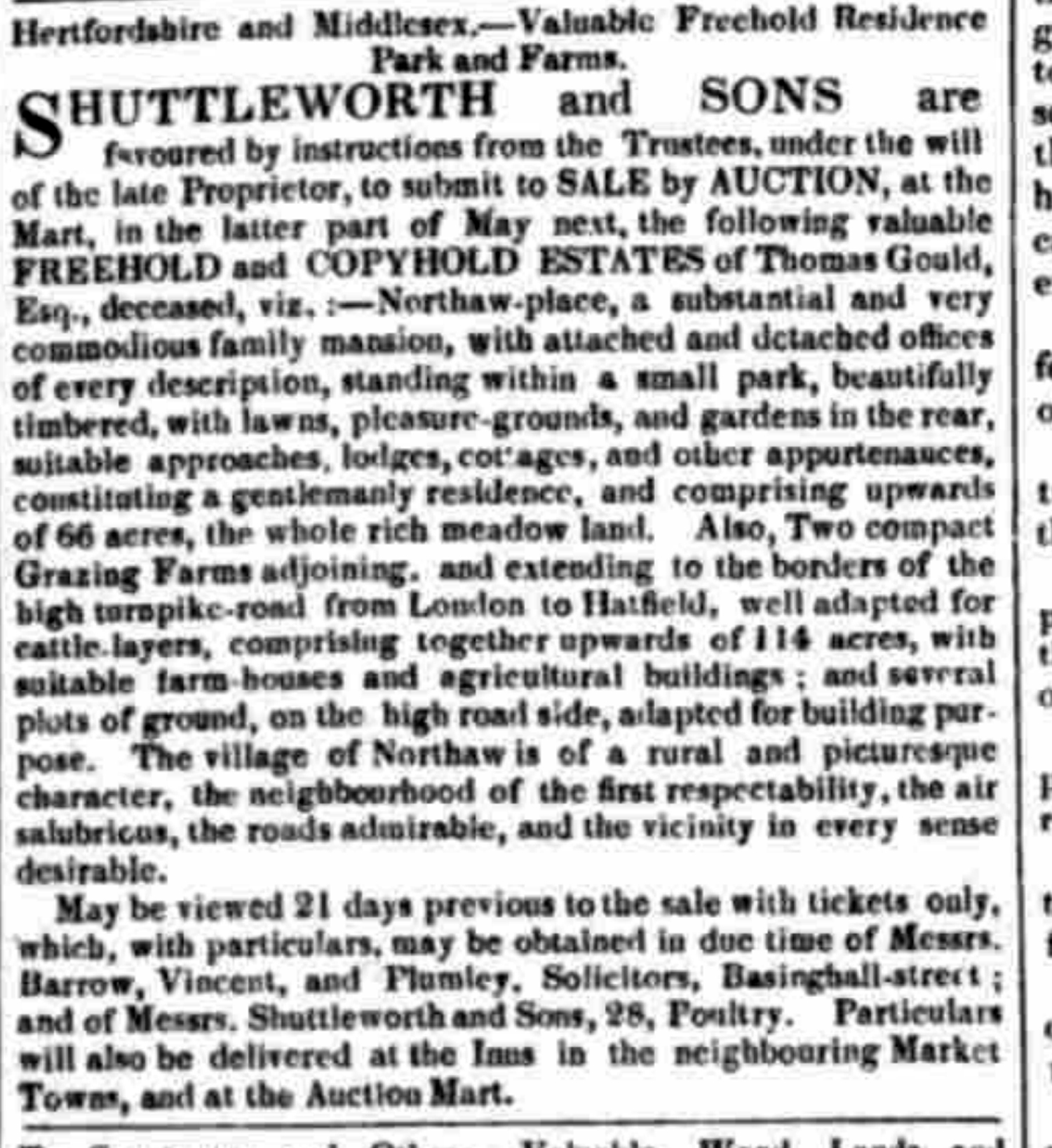
Sale notice for Northaw Place in 1836

John Pope was born in Marnhull, Dorset. His father was Robert Pope who was described as “a gentleman”. He did not marry so when he died in 1784 he left his estate to the children of his sister Jane. His will indicates that he was extremely wealthy as he left large bequests to all of his six Blanchford nieces and nephews. Northaw Place was left to his younger nephew Thomas Blanchford and when he died two years later it went to his brother Robert Pope Blanchford. Shortly after his inheritance Robert sold it to Alexander Watt. Alexander Watt sold the house in about 1800 to Thomas Gould. Thomas Gould was a wealthy London merchant who bought Northaw Place as his county residence. In 1784 he married Frances Hunt and the couple had twelve children. When Thomas died in 1829 he left Northaw Place to his wife Frances and all twelve of his children inherited large sums of money. When Frances died in 1836 the house was advertised for sale. The sale notice is shown. It was bought by David Cameron.

David Cameron was a wealthy property owner from Westminster. His Will shows that he owned many houses in this city including several in Finsbury Circus. In 1820 he married Ann Blyth in London. When David died in 1840 he left Northaw Place to his wife Ann who lived there for several years and then rented it to wealthy tenants. After she died in 1867 the house was advertised for sale. It was bought by John Thomas Mounsey.

John Thomas Mounsey was the son of James Mounsey, an attorney, of Kingfield Hall, Cumbria. He became a wealthy tea merchant in a business owned by his mother's family. In 1862 he married Isabel Lucinda Smith and the couple had ten children. He made substantial additions to the house which were described by the historian John Cussans in the following terms.

“Shortly after Mr. Mounsey purchased the property, he enlarged and restored the house, without however making any structural alteration in the original building.”

The family also bought the nearby house of Fairlawn which is now called “The Dower House”. John died in 1887 and in his Will he left his property equally to his children. Both houses were put on the market for sale. The advertisement for them is at this reference. Isabel died in 1927 and both were buried at St Thomas a Becket Church in Northaw.

The house was sold to Walter Mortimer Allfrey. However due to financial difficulties he was forced to sell the property in 1891. It was bought by the Reverend Frederick John Hall.

Reverend Frederick John Hall was the son of Thomas Grainger Hall, a Professor at King's College London. In 1883 he married Elizabeth Sophia Poland who was the daughter of Reverend Frederick William Poland. The couple had six children. After their marriage they lived in Wymondley House where they opened a preparatory school for boys. They moved the school to Northaw Place in 1891.

In 1992 Elizabeth's father Reverend Frederick William Poland moved to Northacre in Northaw with his unmarried daughter Edith Jane Poland. After her father died in 1903 Edith moved to “St Just” which is very close to Northaw Place.

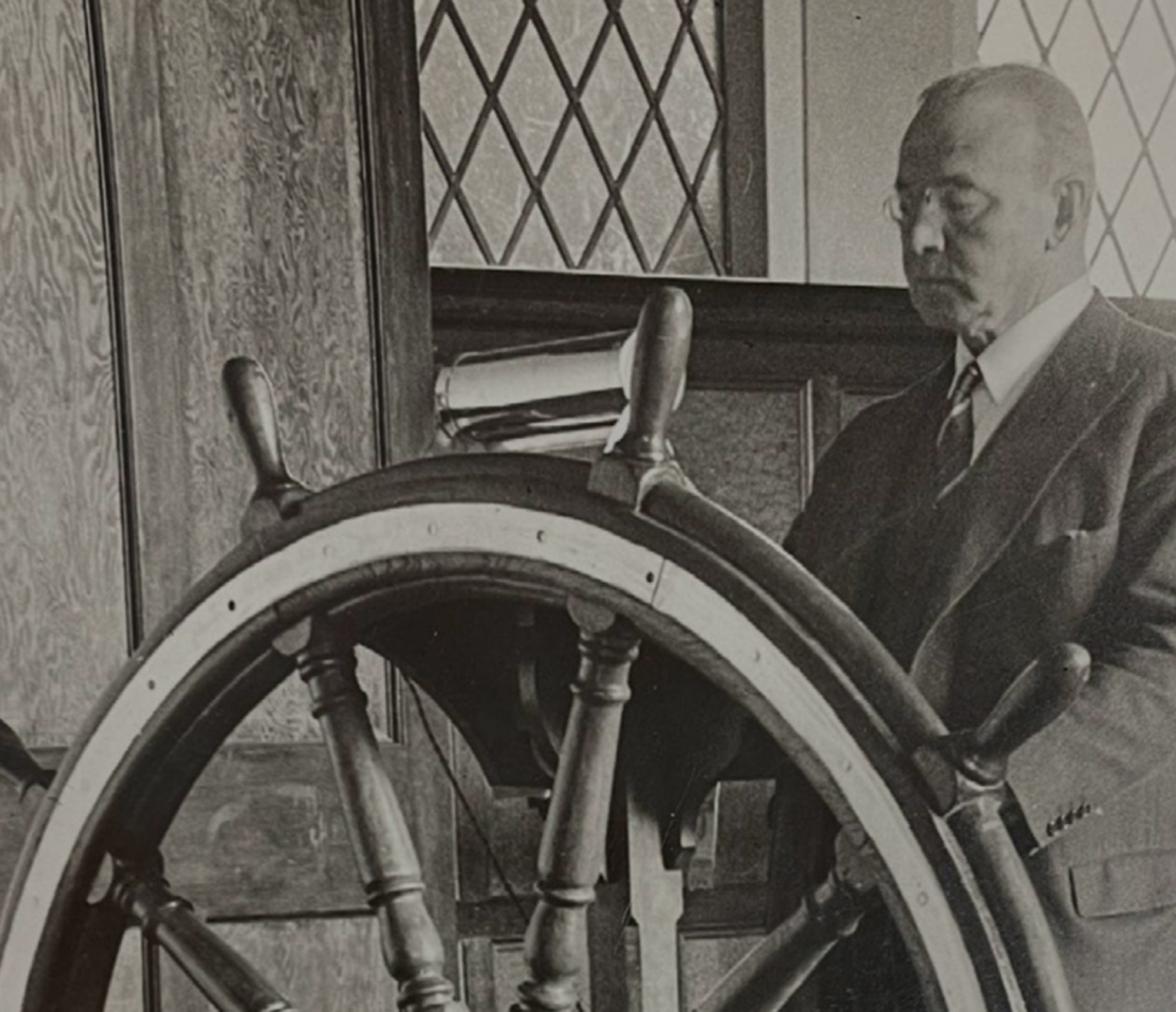
Sir Philip Devitt at a lectern in Pangbourne College which was made from a ship's wheel.

In 1912 the Reverend Hall became the vicar of Shirburn and sometime later appointed Cecil Esdaile Winter as the Headmaster of the Preparatory School in Northaw Place. He remained there until 1929 when Sir Philip Devitt who was Reverend Hall's son in law moved into the house and it again became a private residence. By this time Reverend Hall had retired and in 1922 moved into “St Just” where he remained until his death in 1936. His wife Sophia continued to live at “St Just” until her death in 1947.

Sir Philip Devitt was the owner of a ship-building firm called Devitt and Moore. His father was Sir Thomas Lane Devitt who founded the firm. In 1919 he married Dorothy Maud Hall, who was the daughter of Reverend Frederick John Hall. The couple had five children. He was the founder and chairman of the National Nautical College at Pangbourne. In 1939 he lent Northaw House to the Middlesex County Council for the accommodation of the children of the Chase Farm Schools, Enfield. He and his family went to live at Pangbourne.
