= Haldens =

Area of Welwyn Garden City, Hertfordshire, England

Coordinates: 51.812500°N 0.187273°W

- Haldens area of Welwyn Garden City

- Location within Hertfordshire
- District: Welwyn Hatfield
- Shire county: Hertfordshire
- Region: East
- Country: England
- Sovereign state: United Kingdom
- Post town: WELWYN GARDEN CITY
- Postcode district: AL7
- Police: Hertfordshire
- Fire: Hertfordshire
- Ambulance: East of England
- UK Parliament: Welwyn Hatfield

Haldens is a residential area and ward of Welwyn Garden City within the Welwyn Hatfield district of Hertfordshire, England. It is located to the northeast of the town centre, on the eastern side of the East Coast Main Line. It is directly south of the village of Digswell.

== History ==
Haldens was little more than a rural area, within a Saxons land division. It would remain this way until the 1920s, when it would become part of the new town of Welwyn Garden City as a residential expansion.

== Transport ==
The area is close to Welwyn Garden City railway station. Regular buses connect the area to the town.

The nearby Digswell Viaduct passes the area to the north.

== Present day ==
Haldens is a residential area of Welwyn Garden City, and is close to the main town centre.

== See also ==
- Digswell Viaduct
