= The Dower House, Northaw =

House in Hertfordshire, England

Coordinates: 51°42′17″N 0°09′43″W

The Dower House is a Grade II* listed house in Cooper's Lane between Potters Bar and Northaw in Hertfordshire, England. It was built in 1749 and was formerly known as Fairlawn House.
