= Templewood Primary School =

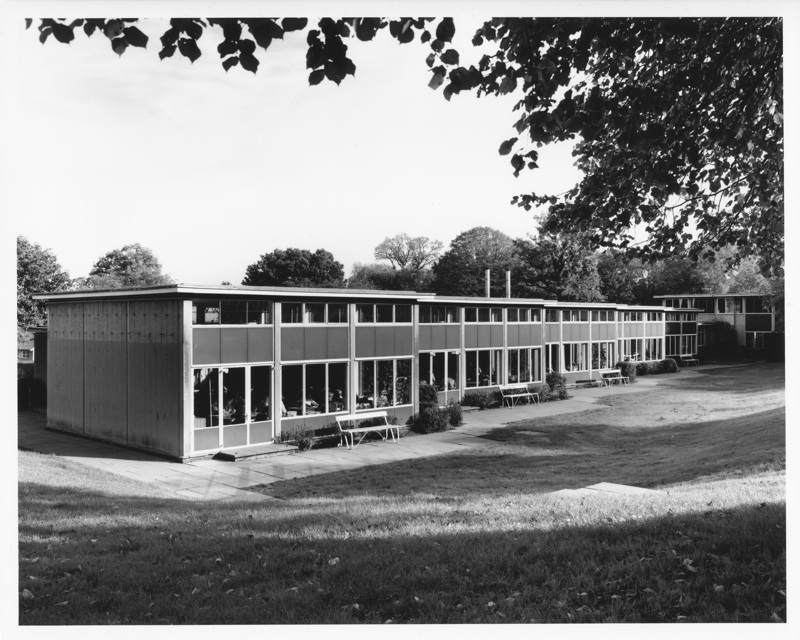

Location
- Pentley Park; Welwyn Garden City; Hertfordshire, AL8 7SD; England
- Coordinates: 51.81014°N 0.20916°W

Information
- Type: Community school
- Local authority: Hertfordshire County Council
- Department for Education URN: 117174 Tables
- Ofsted: Reports
- Gender: Co-educational
- Age: 3 to 11
- Website: www.templewood.herts.sch.uk

Templewood Primary School is a primary school in Pentley Park, Welwyn Garden City, Hertfordshire, England. It is one of a number of modernist schools commissioned by the Hertfordshire County Council in the 20th century and is a Grade II* listed building.
