= 2023 Welwyn Hatfield Borough Council election =

2023 English local election

- 4 May 2023

16 out of 48 seats to Welwyn Hatfield Borough Council 25 seats needed for a majority
- Turnout: 26,836, 32.8%

	First party	Second party	Third party
Leader	Tony Kingsbury	Paul Zukowskyj	Lynn Chesterman
Party	Conservative	Liberal Democrats	Labour
Last election	26 seats, 37.1%	12 seats, 29.6%	10 seats, 29.8%
Seats before	26	12	10
Seats after	22	14	12
Seat change	▼4	▲2	▲2
Popular vote	9,017	6,908	8,239
Percentage	33.8%	25.9%	30.9%
Swing	▼3.3 pp	▼3.7 pp	▲1.1 pp
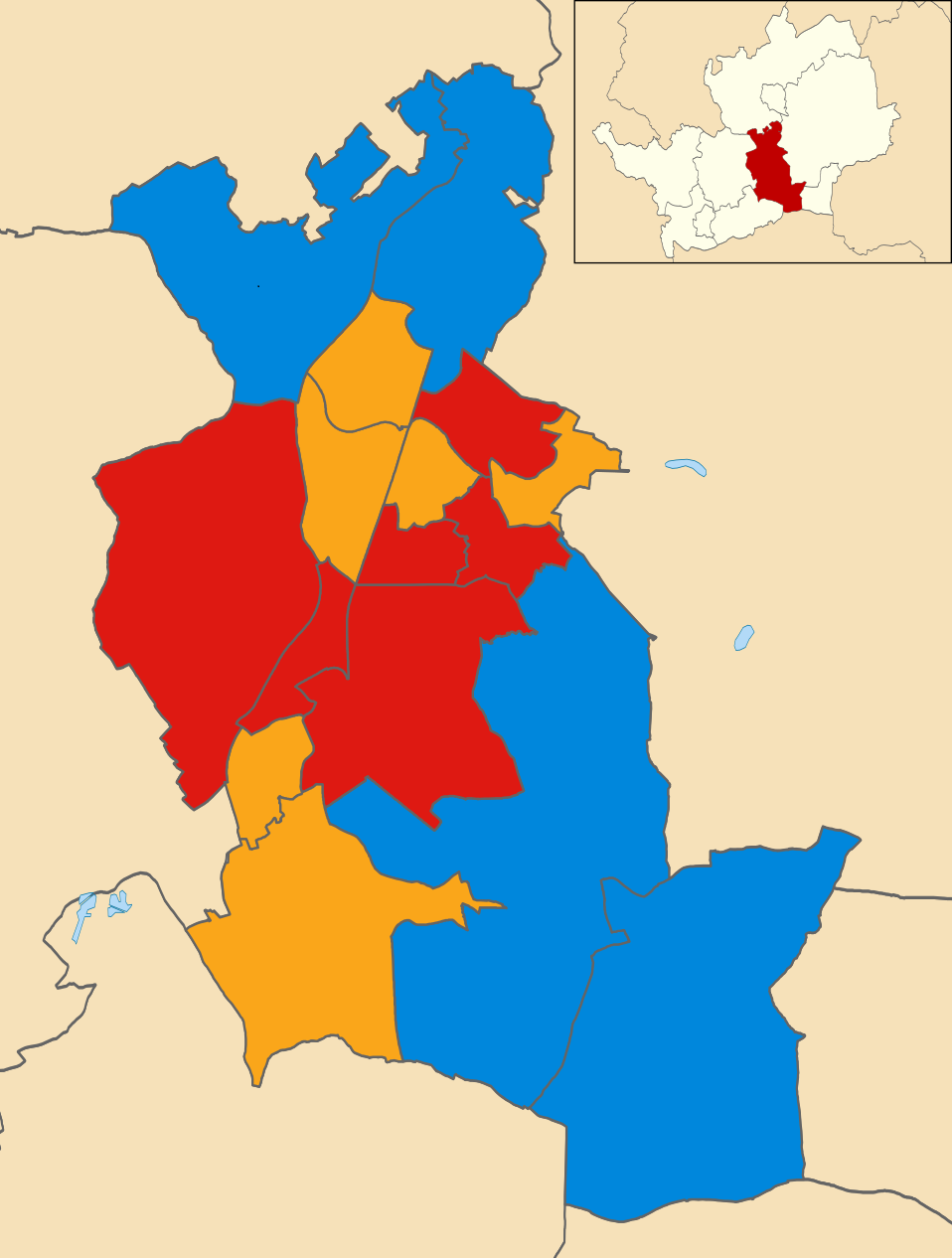
- Winner of each seat at the 2023 Welwyn Hatfield Borough Council election
Leader before election
Tony Kingsbury
Conservative
Leader after election
Paul Zukowskyj
Liberal Democrat
No overall control

The 2023 Welwyn Hatfield Borough Council election took place on 4 May 2023 to elect members of Welwyn Hatfield Borough Council in Hertfordshire, England. This would be on the same day as other local elections across England.

Prior to the election the Conservatives held a narrow majority of the seats on the council. Out of the sixteen seats up for election, five seats changed party hands, leading to the Conservative Party losing their majority and the council going under no overall control. Whilst the Conservatives remained the largest party after the election, a Liberal Democrat and Labour Party coalition subsequently took control of the council.

== Summary ==
=== Election result ===
Welwyn Hatfield Borough Council's composition following the 2023 elections.

2023 Welwyn Hatfield Borough Council election
Party	This election			Full council			This election		
Party	Seats	Net	Seats %	Other	Total	Total %	Votes	Votes %	+/−
Conservative	4	▼4	25.0	18	22	45.8	9,017	33.8	▼3.3
Liberal Democrats	6	▲2	37.5	8	14	29.2	6,908	25.9	▼3.7
Labour	6	▲2	37.5	6	12	25.0	8,239	30.9	▲1.1
Green	0	Steady	0.0	0	0	0.0	2,365	8.9	▲6.3
Reform	0	Steady	0.0	0	0	0.0	162	0.6 (Note: The missing 0.5% of total percentage consists of 145 rejected votes across the wards.)	N/A

== Ward results ==
The Statement of Persons Nominated, which details the candidates standing in each ward, was released by Welwyn Hatfield Borough Council following the close of nominations on 5 April 2023.

=== Brookmans Park and Little Heath ===
Brookmans Park and Little Heath
Party	Candidate	Votes	%	±%
Conservative	Jonathan Boulton*	1,044	61.6	−3.4
Labour	Graham Beevers	308	18.2	−0.9
Liberal Democrats	Peter Basford	204	12.0	−3.9
Green	William Berrington	128	7.6	n/a
Rejected ballots		10	0.6	n/a
Majority		736	43.4	−2.5
Turnout		1694	33.9	−5
Conservative hold		Swing	▼1.3	

=== Haldens ===
Haldens
Party	Candidate	Votes	%	±%
Labour	Astrid Scott	856	50.6	+0.2
Conservative	Neil Bradbury	521	30.8	−4.5
Liberal Democrats	Jason Payne	175	10.3	−4.0
Green	Lesley Smith	131	7.7	n/a
Rejected ballots		8	0.5	n/a
Majority		335	19.8	+4.7
Turnout		1691	34.5	−1.4
Labour gain from Conservative		Swing	▲2.4	

=== Handside ===
Handside
Party	Candidate	Votes	%	±%
Liberal Democrats	Michal Siewniak	1,403	55.7	+0.5
Conservative	Brian Seeger	695	27.6	+0.5
Labour	Mbizo Mpofu	253	10.0	−1.1
Green	Philip Hopley	154	6.1	−3.8
Rejected ballots		16	0.6	n/a
Majority		708	28.1	n/a
Turnout		2521	46.4	−4.0
Liberal Democrats hold		Swing	0	

=== Hatfield Central ===
Hatfield Central
Party	Candidate	Votes	%	±%
Labour	Kieran Thorpe	713	57.2	+4.4
Conservative	Patrick Short	276	22.2	−11.2
Liberal Democrats	Adam Edwards	148	11.9	−1.9
Green	Rody Ribeiro	102	8.2	n/a
Rejected ballots		7	0.6	n/a
Majority		437	35.0	+15.6
Turnout		1246	23.1	−3.1
Labour hold		Swing	▲7.8	

=== Hatfield East ===
Hatfield East
Party	Candidate	Votes	%	±%
Labour	Cathy Watson	712	39.6	−4.5
Conservative	Caron Juggins*	592	32.9	−5.5
Liberal Democrats	Muhammed Joglu	388	21.6	+11.2
Green	Ian Gregory	99	5.5	−1.6
Rejected ballots		9	0.5	n/a
Majority		120	6.7	−12.7
Turnout		1800	32.9	0.0
Labour gain from Conservative		Swing	▲0.5	

=== Hatfield South West ===
Hatfield South West
Party	Candidate	Votes	%	±%
Liberal Democrats	Helena Goldwater	659	43.5	−1.9
Labour	Vaishali Shah	559	36.9	+5.3
Conservative	David Perkins	216	14.3	−5.5
Green	Antony Henn	75	5.0	n/a
Rejected ballots		5	0.3	n/a
Majority		100	6.6	−7.2
Turnout		1514	27.1	−1.6
Liberal Democrats gain from Labour		Swing	▼3.6	

=== Hatfield Villages ===
Hatfield Villages
Party	Candidate	Votes	%	±%
Labour	Rose Grewal	707	43.9	−2.3
Conservative	Phil Kurland	476	29.5	−10.7
Liberal Democrats	Brad Taylor	289	17.9	+5.0
Green	Andreas Kukol	86	5.3	n/a
Reform	Pete Whitehead	48	3	n/a
Rejected ballots		5	0.3	n/a
Majority		231	14.4	+9.1
Turnout		1611	28.2	−1.3
Labour gain from Conservative		Swing	▲4.2	

=== Hollybush ===
Hollybush
Party	Candidate	Votes	%	±%
Labour	Margaret Birleson*	723	57.7	−0.1
Conservative	Abbie Cook	306	24.4	−7.1
Liberal Democrats	Paul Wilson	113	9.0	−1.7
Green	Joseph Bristow	98	7.8	n/a
Rejected ballots		12	1.0	n/a
Majority		417	33.3	+7.0
Turnout		1252	25.5	−5.8
Labour hold		Swing	▲3.5	

=== Howlands ===
Howlands
Party	Candidate	Votes	%	±%
Labour	Jill Weston*	861	54.4	−4.1
Conservative	Ahmad Chattha	502	31.7	−2.8
Liberal Democrats	Hillary Skoczylas	103	6.5	−0.5
Green	Penelope Berrington	102	6.4	n/a
Rejected ballots		14	0.9	n/a
Majority		359	22.7	−1.3
Turnout		1582	30	−4.9
Labour hold		Swing	▼0.7	

=== Northaw and Cuffley ===
Northaw and Cuffley
Party	Candidate	Votes	%	±%
Conservative	George Michaelides*	1,095	66.3	−1.5
Labour	Sheila Barrett	255	15.4	−2.2
Liberal Democrats	Anthony Green	151	9.1	−5.5
Green	Brian Edwards	139	8.4	n/a
Rejected ballots		11	0.7	n/a
Majority		840	50.9	+0.7
Turnout		1651	35.2	+1.3
Conservative hold		Swing	▲0.4	

=== Panshanger ===
Panshanger
Party	Candidate	Votes	%	±%
Liberal Democrats	Jane Quinton*	728	47.0	+7.7
Conservative	Liz McAuliffe	441	28.5	−5.6
Labour	Perry Hewitt	304	19.6	−7.0
Green	Cheryl Miles	68	4.4	n/a
Rejected ballots		8	0.5	n/a
Majority		287	18.5	+13.3
Turnout		1549	35.2	+0.9
Liberal Democrats hold		Swing	▲7.4	

=== Peartree ===
Peartree
Party	Candidate	Votes	%	±%
Liberal Democrats	Simon Goldwater	582	44.2	−7.6
Labour	Tom Green	466	35.4	+2.0
Conservative	Jeet Dhelaria	167	12.7	+1.1
Green	Claudia Ferlisi	91	6.9	n/a
Rejected ballots		10	0.8	n/a
Majority		116	8.8	−9.6
Turnout		1316	24.3	−3.7
Liberal Democrats hold		Swing	▼4.8	

=== Sherrards ===
Sherrards
Party	Candidate	Votes	%	±%
Liberal Democrats	Frank Marsh*	1,020	52.9	−1.5
Labour	Leo Gilbert	416	21.6	+7.3
Conservative	Siva Kumar	337	17.5	−6.8
Green	David Cox	83	4.3	−0.6
Reform	Jack Aaron	69	3.6	n/a
Rejected ballots		3	0.2	n/a
Majority		604	31.3	+1.2
Turnout		1928	44.2	−2.5
Liberal Democrats hold		Swing	▼4.4	

=== Welham Green and Hatfield South ===
Welham Green and Hatfield South
Party	Candidate	Votes	%	±%
Liberal Democrats	Adrienne Nix	613	37.9	−7.7
Conservative	Teresa Travell	566	35.0	+1.8
Labour	Linda Mendez	335	20.7	+3.2
Green	Ian Nendick	50	3.1	n/a
Reform	Shane Scott	45	2.8	n/a
Rejected ballots		9	0.6	n/a
Majority		47	2.9	−9.5
Turnout		1618	31.2	−0.8
Liberal Democrats gain from Conservative		Swing	▼4.8	

=== Welwyn East ===
Welwyn East
Party	Candidate	Votes	%	±%
Conservative	Roger Trigg*	849	45.6	−6.7
Labour	Alan Chesterman	571	30.6	+1.7
Green	Mary Barton	235	12.6	n/a
Liberal Democrats	Pashang Fatemi	204	10.9	−8.2
Rejected ballots		12	0.6	n/a
Majority		278	15.0	−8.3
Turnout		1871	35.7	−7.2
Conservative hold		Swing	▼4.2	

=== Welwyn West ===
Welwyn West
Party	Candidate	Votes	%	±%
Conservative	Tony Kingsbury*	934	46.9	−7.5
Green	Sarah Butcher	724	36.3	+20.2
Labour	Daniel Carlen	200	10.0	−5.3
Liberal Democrats	Simon Archer	128	6.4	−7.7
Rejected ballots		6	0.6	n/a
Majority		210	10.6	−27.6
Turnout		1992	41.3	+2.2
Conservative hold		Swing	▼13.9	
