= Northaw =

Village in Hertfordshire, England

Coordinates: 51°42′N 0°09′W

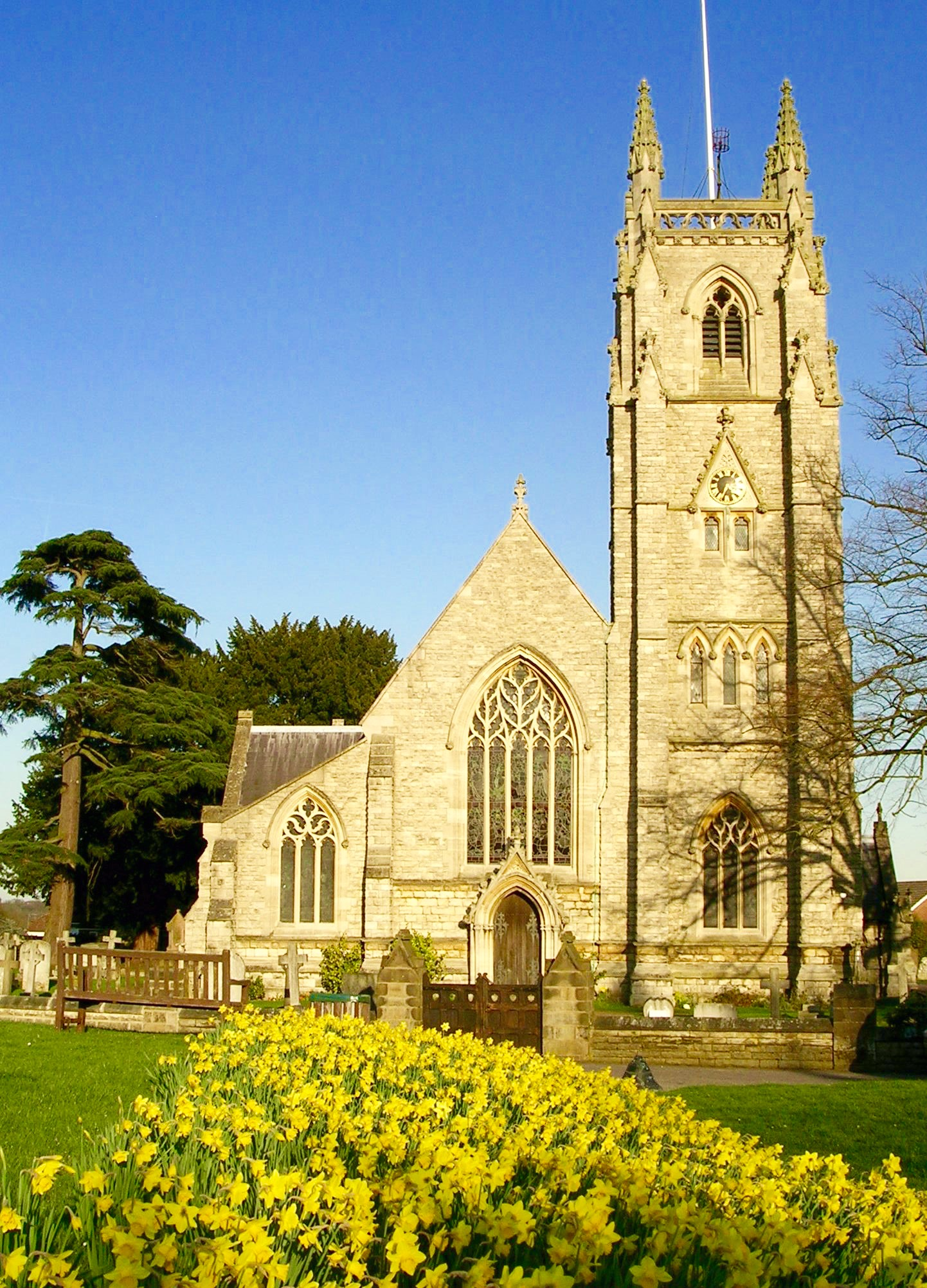
- St Thomas à Becket Church, Northaw

- Location within Hertfordshire
- Population: 590
- OS grid reference: TL27820230
- Civil parish: Northaw and Cuffley
- District: Welwyn Hatfield
- Shire county: Hertfordshire
- Region: East
- Country: England
- Sovereign state: United Kingdom
- Post town: Potters Bar
- Postcode district: EN6
- Dialling code: 01707
- Police: Hertfordshire
- Fire: Hertfordshire
- Ambulance: East of England

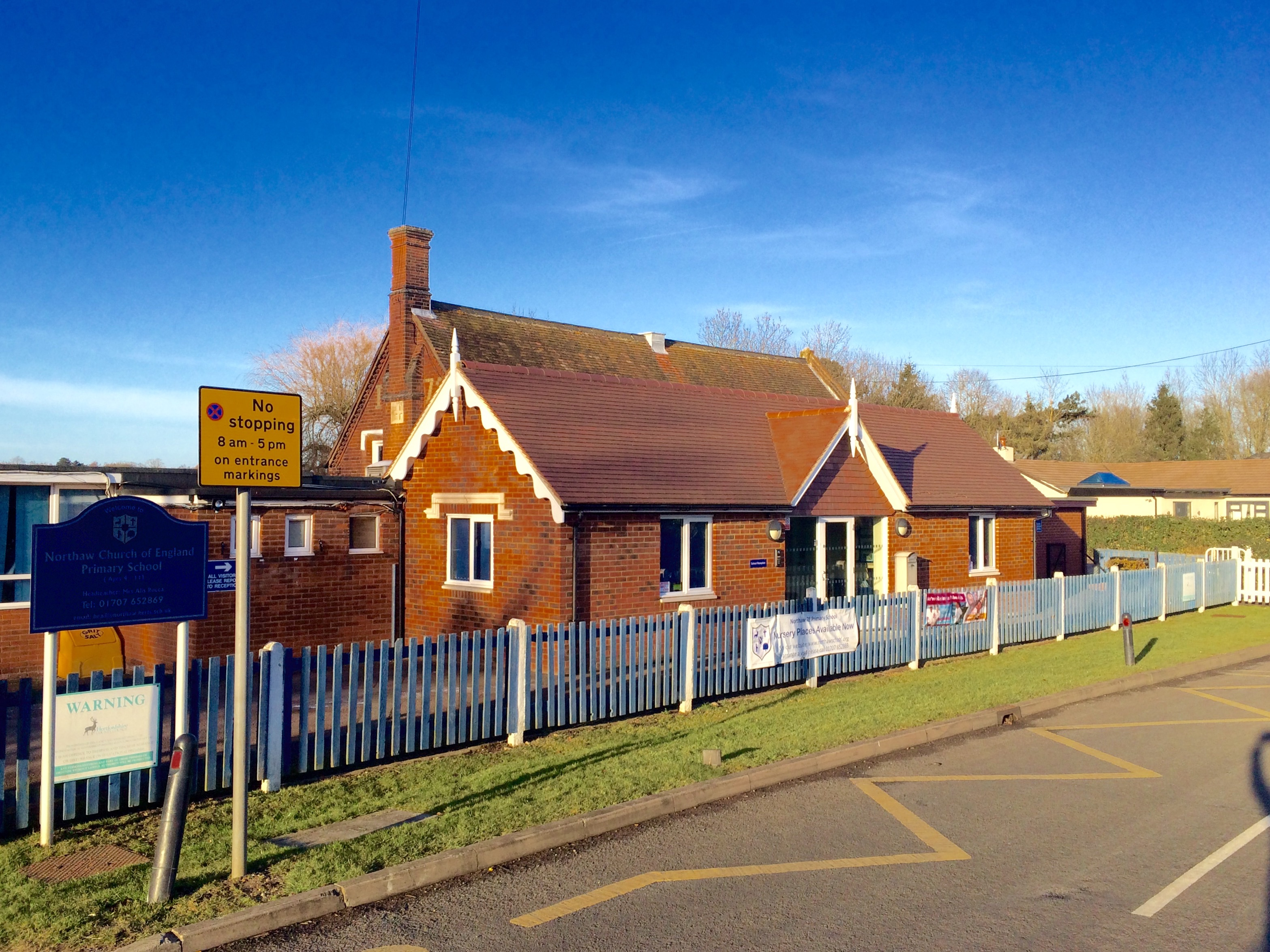
Northaw Church of England Primary School

Northaw is a village in the Welwyn Hatfield district of Hertfordshire, England. It is part of the civil parish of Northaw and Cuffley, which was originally known as Northaw. It had a population of 590.

The parish had a population of 5,190 according to the 2001 census, most of whom live in Cuffley. It formed part of the Metropolitan Police District until 2000. The village has a population of around 590 people.

Northaw Church of England Primary School was founded in 1879 and the trust deed, which is the school's Christian foundation, remains integral to the ethos and beliefs of the school community. The school is a Voluntary Aided School and is part of the family of the Diocese of St Albans.

The parish church of Thomas à Becket is Grade II listed. It was built in 1881, by C. Kirk and Son of Sleaford, replacing a church of 1809. The north aisle was added in 1887, with choir and vestry added in 1893. The church has complete and original stained glass. The east window is signed Ward Hughes 1882, the west window Ward & Hughes 1887 and the three north aisle windows c.1895 are by Heaton, Butler and Bayne.

The common was enclosed in 1806 by the Northaw Inclosure Act 1803.

A Northaw ex-resident was former cabinet minister Cecil Parkinson.

Ornithologist Bernard William Tucker (1901–1950) was born in Northaw.

== Northaw House and manor ==
The manor of Northaw was held by St Albans Abbey in the Middle Ages. Following the abbey's dissolution in 1539, it was held by William Cavendish, with his first wife Elizabeth Parys and his second wife Bess of Hardwick. The manor house became known as "Nyn Hall", "Ninn Hall", "Nyn House" or "North Hall". It was rebuilt in the 16th century, although the exact date remains unclear: according to John Stow, writing in about 1600, it was rebuilt by Cavendish before 1552; but according to John Norden in 1598, the builder was a later owner, Ambrose Dudley, 3rd Earl of Warwick, some time after 1576.

In March 1597, Anne Russell, Countess of Warwick, described Northaw as a "cold, bare and moist place, yet a near neighbour to Tibbols". Lady Anne Clifford stayed in July 1603. Nyn Hall was demolished in 1774 and the replacement Northaw House was built on a different site.
