= 2024 Welwyn Hatfield Borough Council election =

English local election

- 2 May 2024

16 out of 48 seats to Welwyn Hatfield Borough Council 25 seats needed for a majority
- Turnout: 26,848, 32.7%

	First party	Second party	Third party
Leader	Lynn Chesterman	Paul Zukowskyj	Tony Kingsbury
Party	Labour	Liberal Democrats	Conservative
Last election	12 seats, 30.9%	14 seats, 25.9%	22 seats, 33.8%
Seats before	12	14	22
Seats won	8	4	4
Seats after	20	16	12
Seat change	▲8	▲2	▼10
Popular vote	8,549	5,750	9,102
Percentage	31.8%	21.4%	33.9%
Swing	▲0.9%	▼4.5%	▲0.1%
- Winner of each seat at the 2024 Welwyn Hatfield Borough Council election
Leader before election
Paul Zukowskyj
Liberal Democrat
No overall control
Leader after election
Max Holloway
Labour
No overall control

The 2024 Welwyn Hatfield Borough Council election took place on 2 May 2024 to elect members of Welwyn Hatfield Borough Council in Hertfordshire, England. This was on the same day as other local elections across England and Hertfordshire's Police and Crime Commissioner election.

As is typical for Welwyn Hatfield's local elections, sixteen seats of the forty-eight total were contested. Of these sixteen, fourteen seats were held by Conservative councillors and two seats were held by Liberal Democrat councillors.

Prior to the election the council was under no overall control, being run by a Liberal Democrat and Labour coalition which formed after the 2023 local elections. The Conservatives, Liberal Democrats, Labour and the Green Party put candidates forward for all contested seats, with Reform UK additionally contesting seven of these seats and no independent candidates standing for any seat.

Following the election, the council remained under no overall control, with Labour the largest party, overtaking both their coalition partners the Liberal Democrats and the Conservatives. A Labour and Liberal Democrat coalition continued to run the council after the election. Labour changed their group leader after the election to Max Holloway; he was formally appointed as leader of the council at the subsequent annual council meeting on 20 May 2024.

== Election result ==
Welwyn Hatfield Borough Council's composition following the 2024 election.

2024 Welwyn Hatfield Borough Council election
Party	This election			Full council			This election		
Party	Seats	Net	Seats %	Other	Total	Total %	Votes	Votes %	+/−
Labour	8	▲8	50.0	12	20	41.7	8,549	31.8	+0.9
Liberal Democrats	4	▲2	25.0	12	16	33.3	5,750	21.4	–4.5
Conservative	4	▼10	25.0	8	12	25.0	9,102	33.9	+0.1
Green	0	Steady	0.0	0	0	0.0	2,552	9.5	+0.6
Reform	0	Steady	0.0	0	0	0.0	895	3.3	+2.7

== Ward results ==
The Statements of Persons Nominated, which details the candidates standing in each ward, were released by Welwyn Hatfield Borough Council on 8 April 2024 following the close of nominations. The results were announced the day after the election at around mid-day. Sitting councillors standing for re-election are marked with an asterisk (*)

=== Brookmans Park and Little Heath Ward ===
Brookmans Park and Little Heath
Party	Candidate	Votes	%	±%
Conservative	Mark Short	1,036	58.9	−2.7
Labour	Graham Beevers	374	21.3	+3.1
Liberal Democrats	Peter Basford	137	7.8	−4.2
Reform	Harjinderpal Sandhu	120	6.8	N/A
Green	William Berrington	92	5.2	−2.4
Rejected ballots		7		
Majority		662		
Turnout		1,759	35.6	
Conservative hold		Swing		

=== Haldens Ward ===
Haldens Ward
Party	Candidate	Votes	%	±%
Labour	Matthew Hobbs	743	47.7	−2.9
Conservative	Alastair Hellyer*	451	28.9	−1.9
Liberal Democrats	Jason Payne	237	15.2	+4.9
Green	Lesley Smith	127	8.2	+0.5
Rejected ballots		11		
Majority				
Turnout		1,558	31.9	
Labour gain from Conservative		Swing		

=== Handside Ward ===
Handside Ward
Party	Candidate	Votes	%	±%
Liberal Democrats	Anthony Skottowe	1,091	43.7	−12.0
Conservative	Fiona Thomsom*	845	33.9	+6.3
Labour	Vaishall Shah	321	12.9	+2.9
Green	Philip Hopley	136	5.5	−0.6
Reform	Andrew Lewis	101	4.0	N/A
Rejected ballots		5		
Majority				
Turnout		2,494	46.2	
Liberal Democrats gain from Conservative		Swing		

=== Hatfield Central Ward ===
Hatfield Central Ward
Party	Candidate	Votes	%	±%
Labour	Ian Walsh	645	48.2	−9.0
Conservative	James Bond*	328	24.5	+2.3
Reform	Mark Smith	135	10.1	N/A
Liberal Democrats	Edwards Adam	124	9.3	−2.6
Green	Cheryl Miles	105	7.9	−0.3
Rejected ballots		11		
Majority				
Turnout		1,337	25.2	
Labour gain from Conservative		Swing		

=== Hatfield East Ward ===
Hatfield East Ward
Party	Candidate	Votes	%	±%
Labour	Shirley Asare	783	42.3	+2.7
Conservative	Claire Hunt	597	32.2	−0.7
Liberal Democrats	Pashang Fatemi	315	17.0	−4.6
Green	Ian Gregory	158	8.5	+3.0
Rejected ballots		15		
Majority				
Turnout		1,853	33.1	
Labour gain from Conservative		Swing		

=== Hatfield South West Ward ===
Hatfield South Ward
Party	Candidate	Votes	%	±%
Labour	Karthik Bonkur	784	44.5	+7.6
Liberal Democrats	Muhammad Joglu	489	27.7	−15.8
Conservative	Craig Stanbury*	418	23.7	+9.4
Green	Antony John	72	4.1	−0.9
Rejected ballots		13		
Majority				
Turnout		1,763	29.7	
Labour gain from Conservative		Swing		

=== Hatfield Villages Ward ===
Hatfield Villages
Party	Candidate	Votes	%	±%
Labour	Jane Otumunye	669	41.6	−2.3
Conservative	Abbie Cook	551	34.2	+4.7
Liberal Democrats	Brad Taylor	292	18.1	+0.2
Green	Andreas Kukol	98	6.1	+0.8
Rejected ballots		19		
Majority				
Turnout		1,610	27.4	
Labour gain from Conservative		Swing		

=== Hollybush ===
Hollybush
Party	Candidate	Votes	%	±%
Labour	Alan Chesterman	649	52.2	−5.5
Conservative	Marios Artemi	297	23.9	−0.5
Reform	Hamish Haddow	120	9.7	N/A
Green	Peter Gamby	92	7.4	−0.4
Liberal Democrats	Fauzia Haider	85	6.8	−2.2
Rejected ballots		13		
Majority				
Turnout		1,243	25.7	
Labour gain from Conservative		Swing		

=== Howlands Ward ===
Howlands
Party	Candidate	Votes	%	±%
Labour	Katherine Gardner	769	49.6	−4.8
Conservative	Brian Seeger	428	27.6	−4.1
Reform	Dean Milliken	142	9.2	N/A
Green	Penelope Berrington	114	7.4	+1.0
Liberal Democrats	Hillary Skoczylas	96	6.2	−0.3
Rejected ballots		18		
Majority				
Turnout		1,549	29.7	
Labour gain from Conservative		Swing		

=== Northaw and Cuffley Ward ===
Northaw and Cuffley
Party	Candidate	Votes	%	±%
Conservative	Barbara Fitzsimon	852	60.6	−5.7
Labour	Sheila Barrett	272	19.3	+3.9
Green	Brian Edwards	164	11.7	+3.3
Liberal Democrats	Antony Green	118	8.4	−0.7
Rejected ballots		19		
Majority				
Turnout		1,406	30.7	
Conservative hold		Swing		

=== Panshanger Ward ===
Panshanger
Party	Candidate	Votes	%	±%
Liberal Democrats	Salman Khan	541	38.1	−8.9
Conservative	Stan Tunstall*	462	32.6	+4.1
Labour	Perry Hewitt	314	22.1	+2.5
Green	Alice Cowley-French	102	7.2	+2.8
Rejected ballots		14		
Majority				
Turnout		1,419	32.7	
Liberal Democrats gain from Conservative		Swing		

=== Peartree Ward ===
Peartree
Party	Candidate	Votes	%	±%
Liberal Democrats	Russ Platt*	621	43.3	−0.9
Labour	Tom Green	521	36.3	+0.9
Conservative	Jeet Dhelaria	175	12.2	−0.5
Green	Tanya Dickson	118	8.2	+1.3
Rejected ballots		10		
Majority				
Turnout		1,435	26.1	
Liberal Democrats hold		Swing		

=== Sherrards Ward ===
Sherrards
Party	Candidate	Votes	%	±%
Labour	Leo Gilbert	606	31.5	+9.9
Liberal Democrats	Azmat Mughal	590	30.6	−22.3
Conservative	Durk Reyner	475	24.7	+7.2
Green	David Cox	128	6.6	+2.3
Reform	Jack Aaron	126	6.5	+2.9
Rejected ballots		7		
Majority		16	0.8	
Turnout		1,925	44.1	
Labour gain from Conservative		Swing		

=== Welham Green and Hatfield South Ward ===
Welham Green and Hatfield South
Party	Candidate	Votes	%	±%
Liberal Democrats	Paul Zukowskyj*	699	41.6	+3.7
Conservative	Teresa Travell	593	35.3	+0.3
Labour	Linda Mendez	322	19.2	−1.5
Green	Ian Nendick	67	4.0	+0.9
Rejected ballots		11		
Majority		106	6.3	
Turnout		1,681	32.0	
Liberal Democrats hold		Swing		

=== Welwyn East Ward ===
Welwyn East
Party	Candidate	Votes	%	±%
Conservative	Julie Cragg*	777	40.0	−5.6
Labour	Georg von Bülow	587	30.2	−0.4
Liberal Democrats	Genevieve Almeyda	250	12.9	+2.0
Green	Darrin Dexter	178	9.2	−3.4
Reform	Tom Holdsworth	151	7.8	N/A
Rejected ballots		10		
Majority		190	9.8	
Turnout		1,943	37.9	
Conservative hold		Swing		

=== Welwyn West Ward ===
Welwyn West
Party	Candidate	Votes	%	±%
Conservative	Alex Bardett	817	43.6	−3.3
Green	Sarah Butcher	801	42.8	+6.5
Labour	Andrew Osborne	190	10.1	+0.1
Liberal Democrats	Rhiannon Richardson	65	3.5	−2.9
Rejected ballots		7		
Majority		16	0.9	
Turnout		1,873	38.5	
Conservative hold		Swing		

== Changes and by-elections ==
=== Changes ===
- January 2025: Sunny Thusu (Conservative, Welwyn West) was suspended from the Conservatives after it was revealed that he cheated on his medical school exams in 2023.
- May 2025: Larry Crofton (Labour, Hatfield East) left Labour and joined the Green Party.
- June 2025: Sunny Thusu (Independent, Welwyn West) had his suspension lifted and was readmitted to the Conservative group on the council.
- August 2025: Jill Weston (Labour, Howlands) left Labour to sit as an independent after disagreements over the Labour government's position on the Gaza war.
- January 2026: Lucy Musk (Labour, Haldens) left Labour and joined the Green Party; Roger Trigg (Conservative, Welwyn East) died.

=== By-elections ===
==== Brookmans Park & Little Heath ====
Brookmans Park & Little Heath by-election: 1 May 2025
Party	Candidate	Votes	%	±%
Conservative	Fiona Thompson	813	45.9	–13.0
Reform	Michael Southwell	521	29.4	+22.6
Labour	Graham Beevers	223	12.6	–8.7
Liberal Democrats	Anthony Green	134	7.6	–0.2
Green	William Berrington	82	4.6	–0.6
Majority		292	16.5	–21.1
Turnout		1,776	35.3	–0.3
Registered electors		5,028		
Conservative hold		Swing	▼17.8	

==== Peartree ====
Peartree by-election: 1 May 2025
Party	Candidate	Votes	%	±%
Liberal Democrats	Fauzia Haider	420	34.2	–9.1
Reform	Mark Biddle	375	30.6	N/A
Labour	Sarah Ellingworth	243	19.8	–16.5
Conservative	Jeet Dhelaria	98	8.0	–4.2
Green	Tanya Dickson	91	7.4	–0.8
Majority		45	3.6	–3.4
Turnout		1,232	22.1	–4.0
Registered electors		5,580		
Liberal Democrats hold				
