= Guessens =

Listed house in Hertfordshire, England

Coordinates: 51°49′54″N 0°12′56″W

Guessens is a Grade II* listed timber-framed house at 6 Codicote Road, Welwyn, Hertfordshire, England. It was built in the early 17th century and has later additions. The facade of the building, previously a farmhouse dating from the 1600s or earlier, is rendered with stucco in order to imitate more expensive masonry, a technique common in the 1730s when it was rebuilt. The house was then extended in the 1800s. From 1730 to 1765 it was the residence of the poet and dramatist Edward Young, who was also rector of Welwyn.
