= Welwyn Hatfield =

District in Hertfordshire, England

Coordinates: 51°46′00″N 0°11′30″W

- Non-metropolitan district, Borough
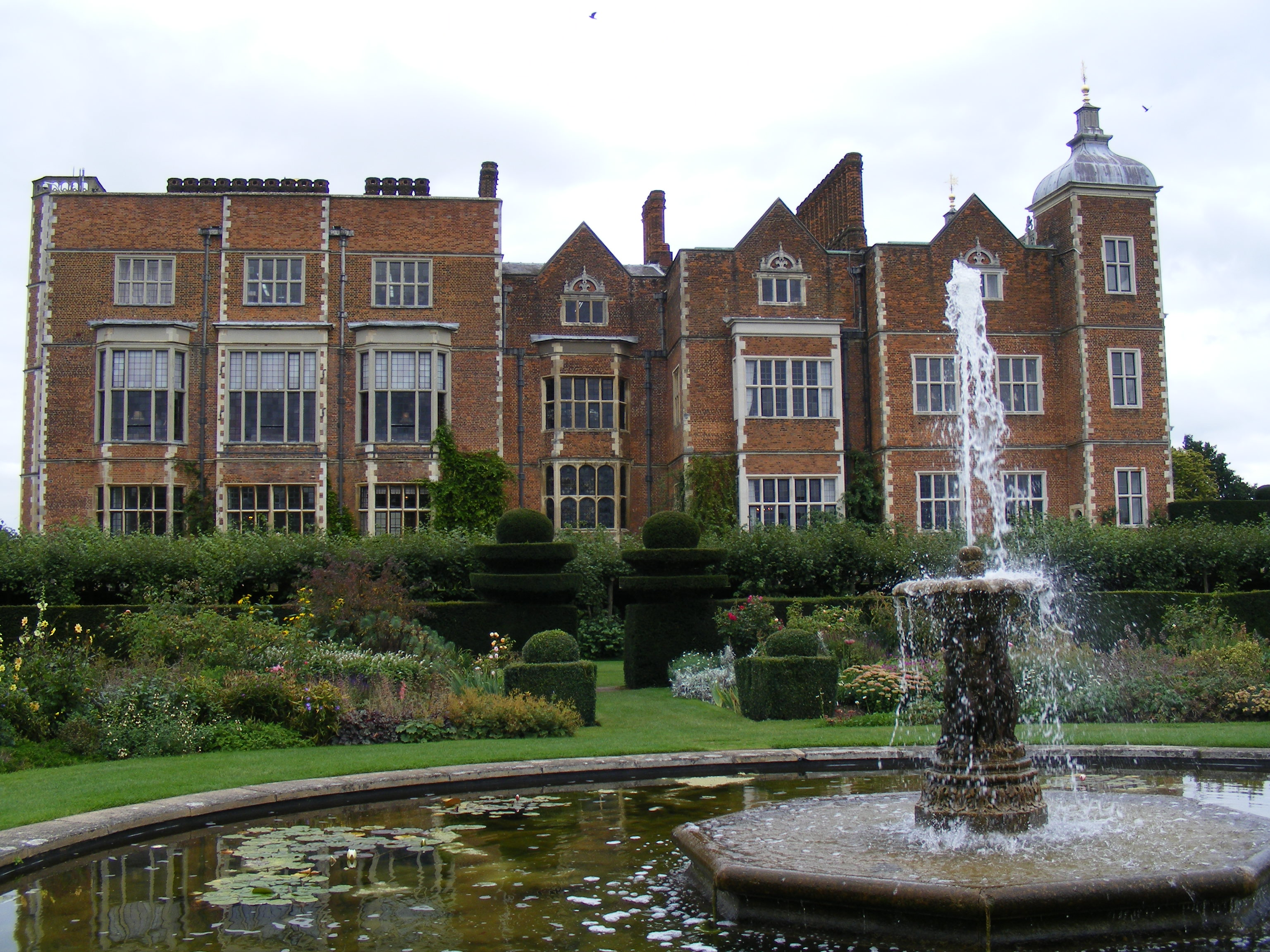
- Hatfield House

- Welwyn Hatfield shown within Hertfordshire
- Sovereign state: United Kingdom
- Constituent country: England
- Region: East of England
- Non-metropolitan county: Hertfordshire
- Admin HQ: Welwyn Garden City
- Incorporated: 1 April 1974
- Named for: Welwyn (village) and Hatfield (town)

Government
  - Type: Non-metropolitan district council
  - Body: Welwyn Hatfield Borough Council
  - MP: Andrew Lewin (L); Oliver Dowden (C)

Area
  - Total: 50.02 sq mi (129.55 km^{2})
  - Rank: 176th (of 296)

Population (2024)
  - Total: 122,819
  - Rank: 199th (of 296)
  - Density: 2,455.4/sq mi (948.04/km^{2})

Ethnicity (2021)
  - Ethnic groups: List: 78.7% White; 8.8% Asian; 6.1% Black; 4.1% Mixed; 2.3% other

Religion (2021)
  - Religion: List: 47.2% Christianity; 37% no religion; 12.5% other; 3.3% Islam
- Time zone: UTC0 (GMT)
  - Summer (DST): UTC+1 (BST)
- ONS code: 26UL (ONS); E07000241 (GSS)
- OS grid reference: TL245135

Welwyn Hatfield is a local government district with borough status in the county of Hertfordshire, England. Its council is based in Welwyn Garden City. The borough borders Hertsmere, St Albans, North Hertfordshire, East Hertfordshire, Broxbourne, and the London Borough of Enfield.

The borough includes the two towns of Welwyn Garden City and Hatfield, along with numerous smaller settlements from Woolmer Green in the north to Cuffley in the south. The borough has six railway stations on the Great Northern Railway; five being on the main line and one on the Hertford loop line. The Digswell Viaduct is a local landmark. The A1 road passes through the borough.

Much of the borough lies within the Metropolitan Green Belt which surrounds London. Welwyn Garden City is notable as being one of only two Garden Cities in the country, and is uniquely both a Garden City and a designated New Town. The University of Hertfordshire has its main campus at Hatfield.

== History ==
Welwyn Hatfield was created on 1 April 1974 under the Local Government Act 1972, covering the area of three former districts, which were all abolished at the same time:

- Hatfield Rural District
- Welwyn Garden City Urban District
- Welwyn Rural District

The new district was named Welwyn Hatfield. From 1974 to 2006 the council was called Welwyn Hatfield District Council. The council petitioned for borough status in 2005, allowing the chair of the council to take the title of mayor. The petition was agreed to by the Privy Council and a charter conferring borough status was issued which took effect on 22 May 2006, when John Hawkins was appointed the first mayor and the council's name changed to Welwyn Hatfield Borough Council.

Under current local government reorganisation plans, all district councils in Hertfordshire, as well as the county council, will be abolished in 2028, with the district becoming part of a new Central Hertfordshire unitary authority.

== Governance ==
Welwyn Hatfield Borough Council

Type
- Type: Non-metropolitan district council

Leadership
- Mayor: Michal Siewniak, Liberal Democrat since 21 May 2026
- Leader: Rose Grewal, Labour since 6 February 2026
- Chief Executive: Ka Ng since July 2021

Structure
- Seats: 48
- Political groups: Administration (31) Labour (16) Liberal Democrats (15) Opposition (15) Conservative (12) Reform (3) Other parties (2) Independent (2)

Elections
- Last election: 7 May 2026

Meeting place
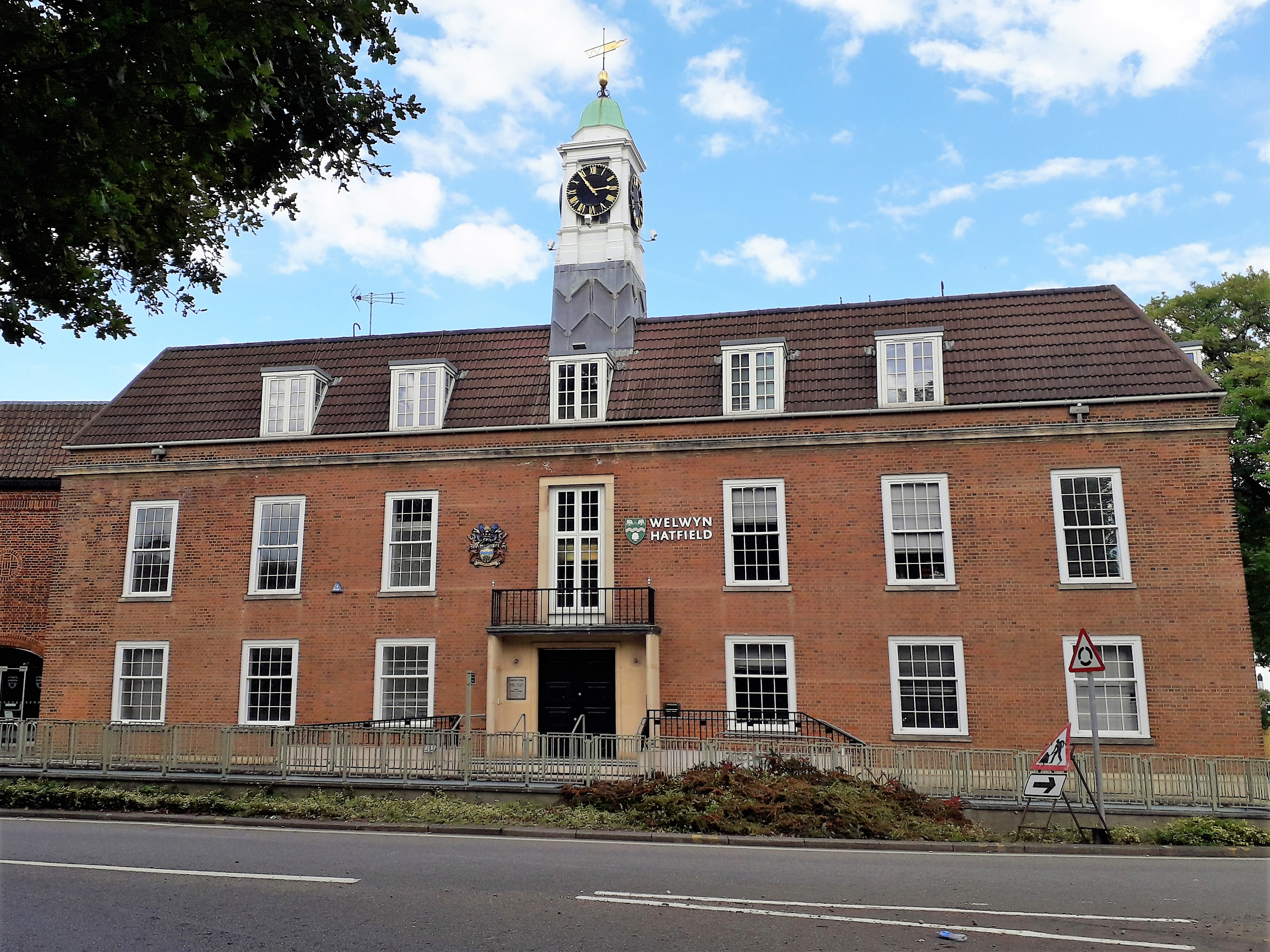
- Council Offices, The Campus, Welwyn Garden City, AL8 6AE

Website
- www.welhat.gov.uk

Hertfordshire has a two-tier structure of local government, with the ten district councils (including Welwyn Hatfield Borough Council) providing district-level services, and Hertfordshire County Council providing county-level services.

=== Political control ===
The council has been under no overall control since the 2023 election. After that election, the Conservatives were the largest party, but a Liberal Democrat and Labour coalition formed to take control of the council. The Liberal Democrats were the larger party in the coalition from 2023 to 2024. Following the 2024 election, a Labour and Liberal Democrat coalition continued to run the council, with Labour overtaking their coalition partners and also becoming the largest party on the council. In January 2026, following disagreements on whether to postpone local elections to facilitate local government reorganisation, the Liberal Democrats pulled out of the coalition agreement. On 29 January, leader of the council Max Holloway announced his resignation with effect from 6 February 2026. He was replaced as leader by Labour councillor Rose Grewal.

The first election to the council was held in 1973, initially operating as a shadow authority alongside the outgoing authorities until the new system came into force on 1 April 1974. Political control since 1974 has been as follows:

Party in control	Years
Labour	1974–1976
Conservative	1976–1979
Labour	1979–1992
Conservative	1992–1994
Labour	1994–1999
Conservative	1999–2000
Labour	2000–2002
Conservative	2002–2019
No overall control	2019–2021
Conservative	2021–2023
No overall control	2023–present

=== Leadership ===
The role of mayor is largely ceremonial in Welwyn Hatfield, and is usually held by a different councillor each year. Political leadership is instead provided by the leader of the council. The leaders since 2005 have been:

Councillor	Party	From	To
John Dean	Conservative	May 2005	May 2018
Mandy Perkins	Conservative	21 May 2018	29 September 2018
Tony Kingsbury	Conservative	19 November 2018	22 May 2023
Paul Zukowskyj	Liberal Democrats	22 May 2023	20 May 2024
Max Holloway	Labour	20 May 2024	6 February 2026
Rose Grewal	Labour	6 February 2026	

=== Composition ===
Following the 2026 local elections, the composition of the council is:

Party	Seats
Labour	16
Liberal Democrats	15
Conservative	12
Reform	3
Independent	2
Total	48

== Premises ==
The council is based at the Council Offices on The Campus in the centre of Welwyn Garden City, which it inherited from the old Welwyn Garden City Urban District Council. The building was completed in 1937.

== Towns and Parishes ==
Welwyn Hatfield contains eight civil parishes. The town of Welwyn Garden City is an unparished area. The parishes are:

- Ayot St Lawrence
- Ayot St Peter
- Essendon
- Hatfield (Note: Parish council takes the style of "town council".)
- North Mymms
- Northaw and Cuffley
- Welwyn
- Woolmer Green

== Elections ==
Since the last boundary changes in 2016 the council has comprised 48 councillors representing 16 wards, each of which elects three councillors. Elections are held three years out of every four, electing one councillor from each ward each time. Elections to Hertfordshire County Council are held in the fourth year of the cycle when there are no borough council elections.

=== Wards ===
The wards of the borough are:

- Brookmans Park & Little Heath
- Haldens
- Handside
- Hatfield Central
- Hatfield East
- Hatfield South West
- Hatfield Villages
- Hollybush
- Howlands
- Northaw and Cuffley
- Panshanger
- Peartree
- Sherrards
- Welham Green and Hatfield South
- Welwyn East
- Welwyn West

=== Wider politics ===
Most of Welwyn Hatfield borough is within Welwyn Hatfield parliamentary constituency, whose current MP for Welwyn Hatfield is Andrew Lewin of the Labour Party. The constituency's boundaries differ from the borough only by the single ward of Northaw and Cuffley being within the borough, but in the parliamentary constituency of Hertsmere, whose current MP is Oliver Dowden of the Conservative Party.

== Arms ==
Coat of arms of Welwyn Hatfield

Notes
Granted 11 February 1976
Crest
On a Wreath of the Colours within a Circlet of eight Roses Gules each charged with another Argent barbed and seeded proper a Garb Or between two Wings displayed Azure.
Escutcheon
Or a Fess wavy between in chief a Bar wavy Azure surmounted of two Willow Trees couped and in base an Oak Tree couped fructed proper.
Supporters
On either side a Hart Royal proper that on the dexter charged on the shoulder with two Pairs of Dividers in fess inverted and extended the interior points contiguous Argent and that on the sinister with a representation of a Roman Wine Jar Or within a Cage Sable.
Motto
By Wisdom And Design
Badge
On a Bezant environed of a Torse Or and Azure two Pallets Azure surmounted of a Bar dancetty of two points downward counter-changed.
