= Northaw and Cuffley =

Civil parish in Hertfordshire, England

Coordinates: 51.706°N 0.127°W

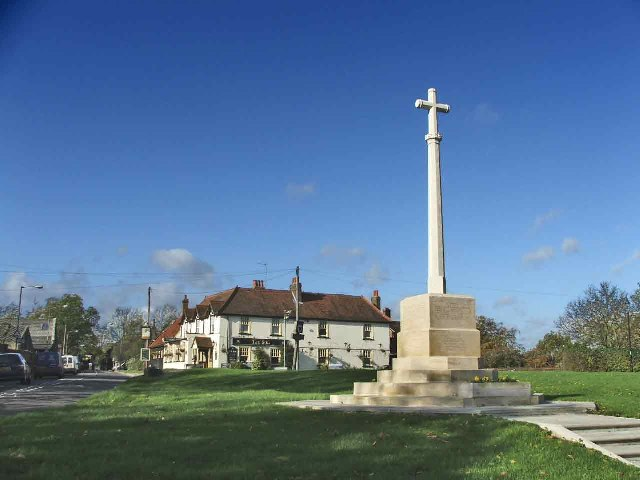
- War memorial and Sun public house, Northaw

- Location within Hertfordshire
- Area: 5.957 sq mi (15.43 km^{2})
- Population: 6,086 (2021 Census)
  - Density: 1,022/sq mi (395/km^{2})
- OS grid reference: TL294025
  - London: 13.5 mi (21.7 km) S
- Civil parish: Northaw and Cuffley
- District: Welwyn Hatfield
- Shire county: Hertfordshire
- Region: East
- Country: England
- Sovereign state: United Kingdom
- Post town: Potters Bar
- Postcode district: EN6
- Dialling code: 01707
- Police: Hertfordshire
- Fire: Hertfordshire
- Ambulance: East of England
- UK Parliament: Hertsmere
- Website: northawcuffleypc.co.uk

Northaw and Cuffley is a civil parish in the Welwyn Hatfield borough of Hertfordshire, England. Located approximately 13.5 miles (21.7 km) north of central London and adjacent to the Greater London boundary, it is a partly urbanised parish with large sections of open land. Northaw and Cuffley is a recent renaming of the ancient parish of Northaw, covering the settlements of Northaw and Cuffley. The local council is Northaw and Cuffley Parish Council.

== History ==
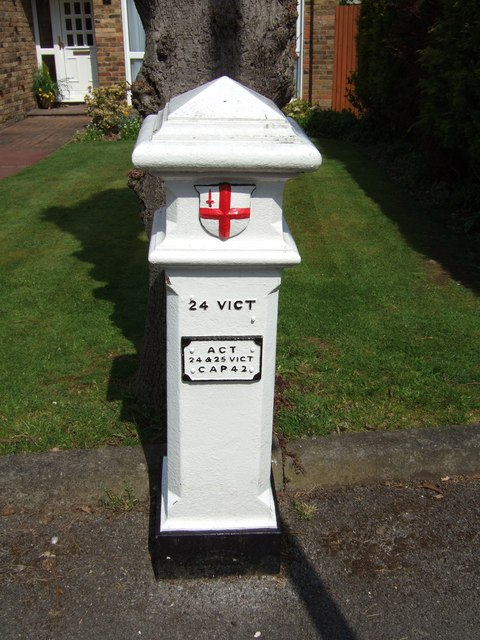
A coal-tax post adorned with the coat of arms of the City of London marks the northern boundary of the parish

Northaw was an ancient parish in the Cashio Hundred of the county of Hertfordshire. It formed part of the Hatfield Rural District from 1894, when the parish council was created.

The parish was within the Metropolitan Police District and was part of the review area of the Royal Commission on Local Government in Greater London, however it did not form part of the proposed Greater London area.

The Hatfield Rural District was abolished in 1974 and the parish become part of the Welwyn Hatfield district. The parish was renamed Northaw and Cuffley on 10 March 1982. In 1994 there was a change to the boundary with Greater London when some land was gained from the London Borough of Enfield and the boundary became aligned to the M25 motorway.

The parish was removed from the Metropolitan Police District in 2000. Following a successful petition by the district council, in 2005 Welwyn Hatfield became a borough and the district council became a borough council.

== Government ==
The local council is Northaw and Cuffley Parish Council. The parish council offices are located on Maynard Place, Cuffley. Eight councillors are elected to the council. Northaw and Cuffley is a ward of the borough of Welwyn Hatfield and elects three councillors to Welwyn Hatfield Borough Council. For elections to Hertfordshire County Council, the parish is within the Hatfield Rural county division, which covers an area larger than the parish and elects one councillor. Although the rest of Welwyn Hatfield forms a constituency for elections to the UK Parliament, Northaw and Cuffley is instead part of the Hertsmere constituency. For elections to the European Parliament it was part of the East of England constituency.

== Geography ==
The boundaries of the parish of Northaw and Cuffley

The civil parish is located approximately 13.5 miles (21.7 km) north of central London and is adjacent to the Greater London boundary to the south. It is within the Metropolitan Green Belt and has large sections of protected open land. The parish includes the settlements of Northaw and Cuffley. For postal addresses, the parish is within the EN6 postcode district of the Potters Bar post town.

== Demography ==
The parish had a population of 6,086 according to the 2021 census, most of whom live in Cuffley.
