= Epping Forest District Council elections =

Local government elections in Essex, England

The district of Epping Forest is in the county of Essex in England. It was created on 1 April 1974, following the merger of Epping Urban District, Chigwell Urban District, Waltham Holy Cross Urban District, and part of Epping and Ongar Rural District.

Until 2002, Epping Forest District Council was represented by 59 councillors. In 2002 the ward boundaries were reorganised, resulting in the loss of one council seat, and since then the district has had 58 councillors representing 32 wards. Each ward is represented by one, two or three councillors, depending on the ward's population, so that each councillor represents a roughly equal proportion of the district's electorate.

Councillors serve for a four-year term. They are elected on a "cycle of thirds", i.e. one third of the Council is elected each year, followed by one year without election.

New ward boundaries are being prepared to take effect from the 2024 elections.

== Summary of results since 2002 ==
The table below summarises the number of seats held by each party after each year's elections (no elections took place in 2005, 2009, 2013 and 2017). The council returned to Conservative control following the gain of a seat in a by-election in December 2006 after being under no overall control since 1994.

Party	2004	2006	2007	2008	2010	2011	2012	2014	2015	2016	2018	2019	2021	2022
BNP	3	6	6	4	1	1	0	0	0	0	0	0	0	0
Conservative	26	29	32	33	35	37	39	37	39	35	39	37	36	35
For Britain	0	0	0	0	0	0	0	0	0	0	0	1	1	1
Green	0	0	0	0	0	0	0	1	1	2	2	3	3	3
Independent	5	4	3	5	2	3	2	2	2	3	2	2	2	2
Labour	4	1	1	1	1	1	1	1	0	0	0	0	0	0
Liberal Democrats	14	13	11	9	8	6	4	3	2	3	2	3	3	4
Loughton Residents	6	5	5	6	11	10	12	12	12	13	13	13	13	13
UKIP	0	0	0	0	0	0	0	2	2	2	0	0	0	0

== Council elections ==
- 1973 Epping Forest District Council election
- 1976 Epping Forest District Council election
- 1979 Epping Forest District Council election (New ward boundaries)
- 1980 Epping Forest District Council election
- 1982 Epping Forest District Council election
- 1983 Epping Forest District Council election
- 1984 Epping Forest District Council election
- 1986 Epping Forest District Council election
- 1987 Epping Forest District Council election (District boundary changes took place but the number of seats remained the same)
- 1988 Epping Forest District Council election
- 1990 Epping Forest District Council election (District boundary changes took place but the number of seats remained the same)
- 1991 Epping Forest District Council election
- 1992 Epping Forest District Council election
- 1994 Epping Forest District Council election (District boundary changes took place but the number of seats remained the same)
- 1995 Epping Forest District Council election (District boundary changes took place but the number of seats remained the same)
- 1996 Epping Forest District Council election
- 1998 Epping Forest District Council election
- 1999 Epping Forest District Council election
- 2000 Epping Forest District Council election
- 2002 Epping Forest District Council election (New ward boundaries reduced the number of seats by 1)
- 2003 Epping Forest District Council election
- 2004 Epping Forest District Council election
- 2006 Epping Forest District Council election
- 2007 Epping Forest District Council election
- 2008 Epping Forest District Council election
- 2010 Epping Forest District Council election
- 2011 Epping Forest District Council election
- 2012 Epping Forest District Council election (Some new ward boundaries)
- 2014 Epping Forest District Council election
- 2015 Epping Forest District Council election
- 2016 Epping Forest District Council election
- 2018 Epping Forest District Council election
- 2019 Epping Forest District Council election
- 2021 Epping Forest District Council election
- 2022 Epping Forest District Council election
- 2023 Epping Forest District Council election
- 2024 Epping Forest District Council election (New ward boundaries)
- 2026 Epping Forest District Council election

== Results maps ==
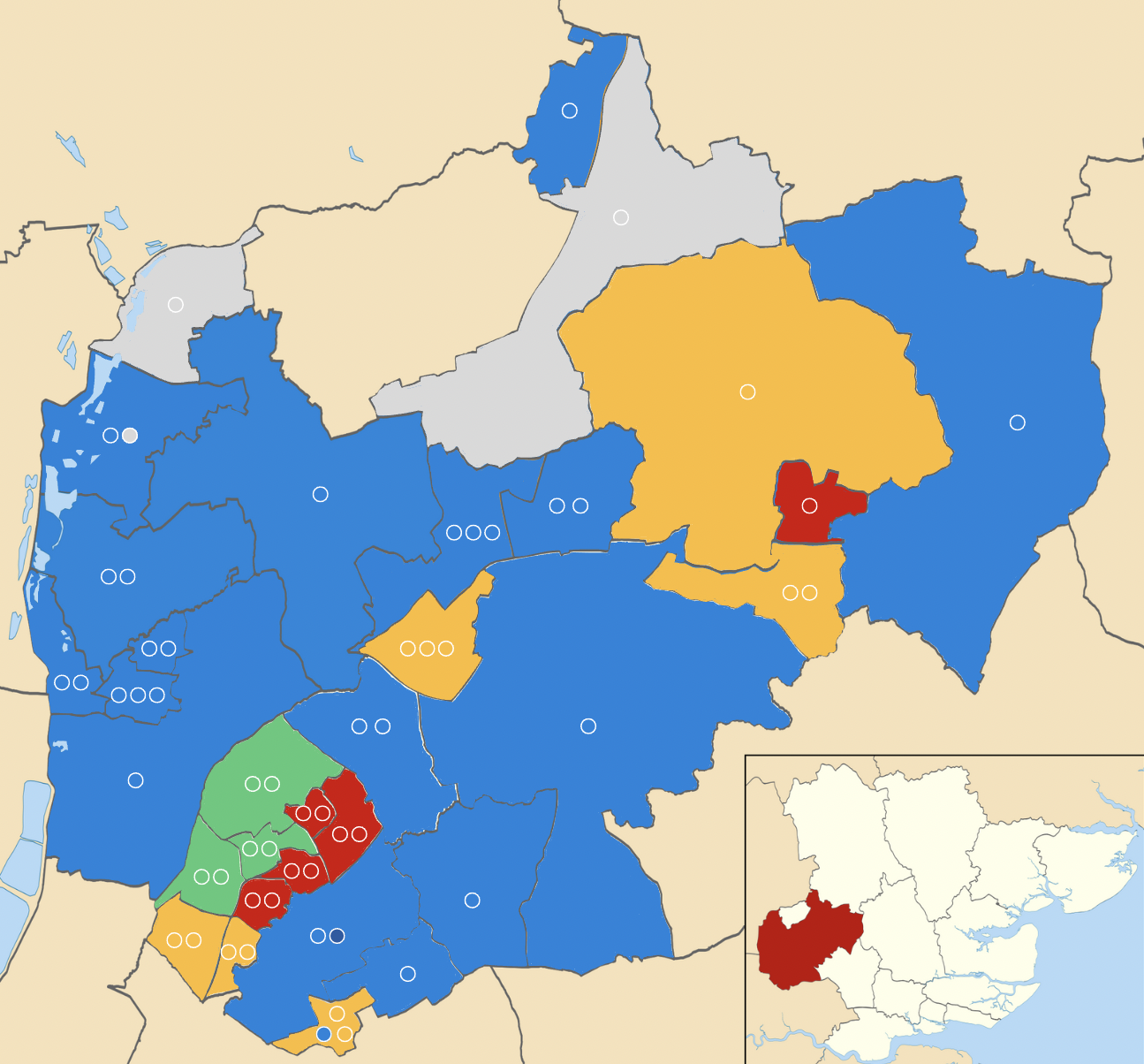
2002 results map

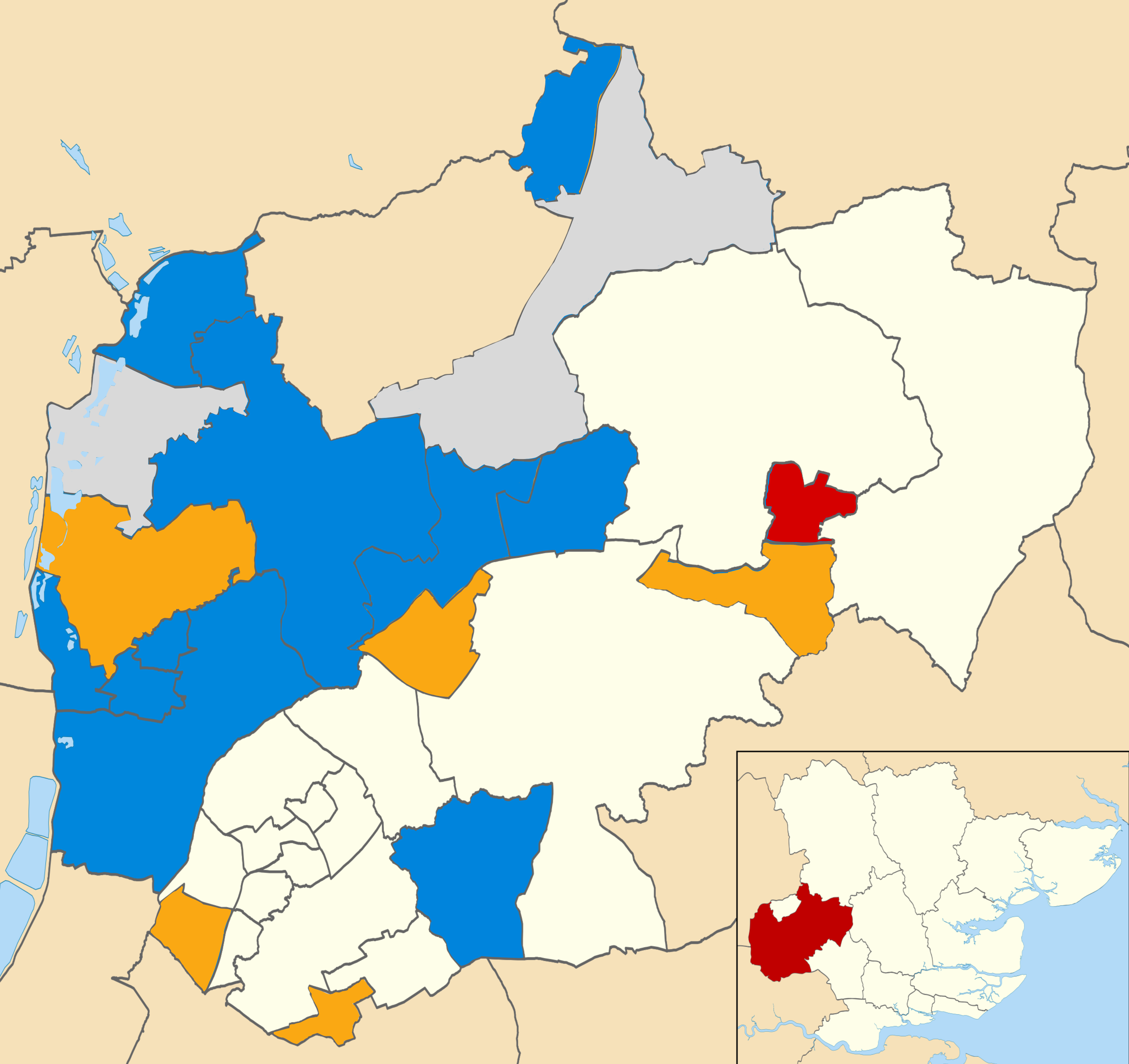
2003 results map

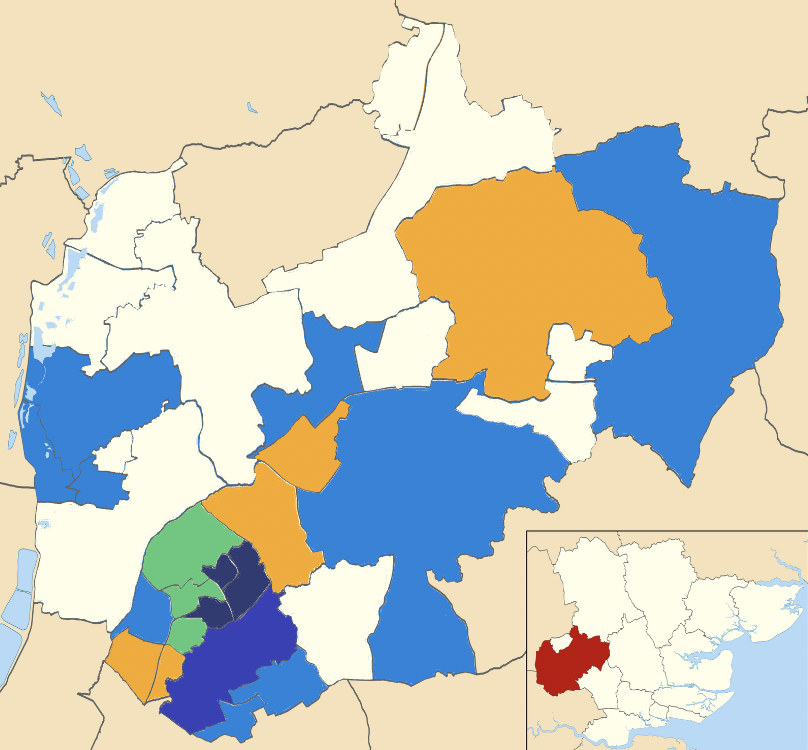
2004 results map

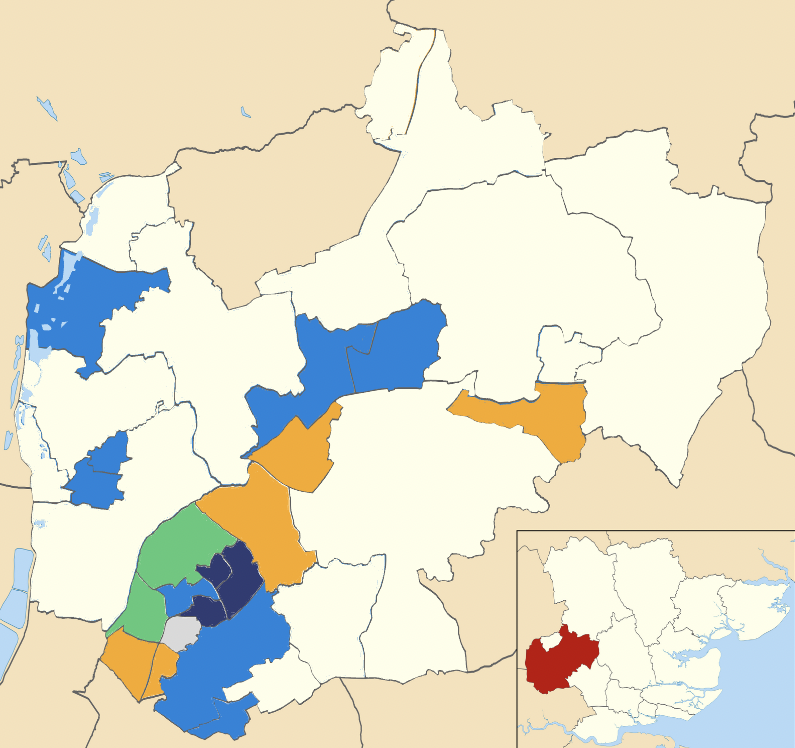
2006 results map

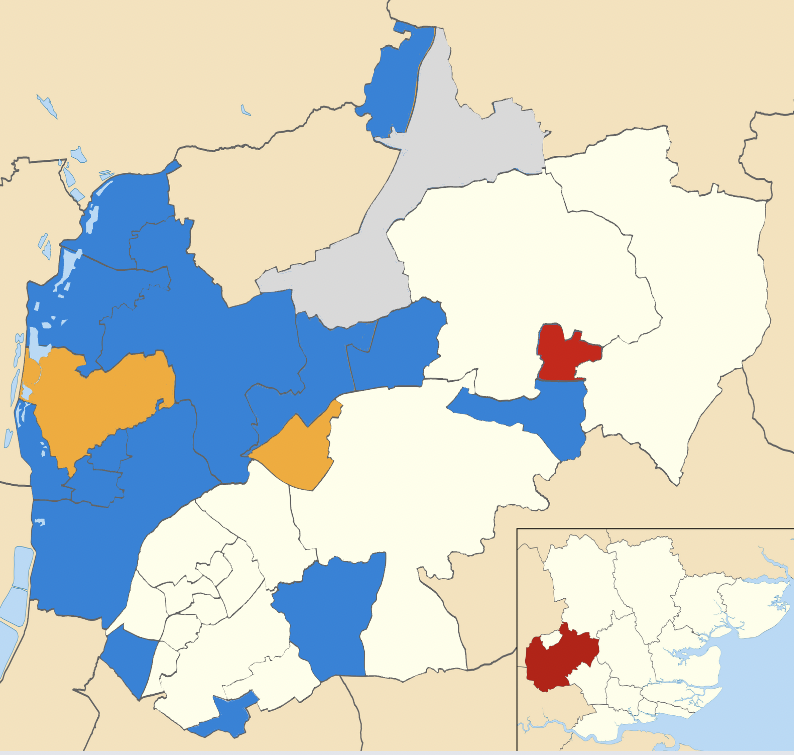
2007 results map

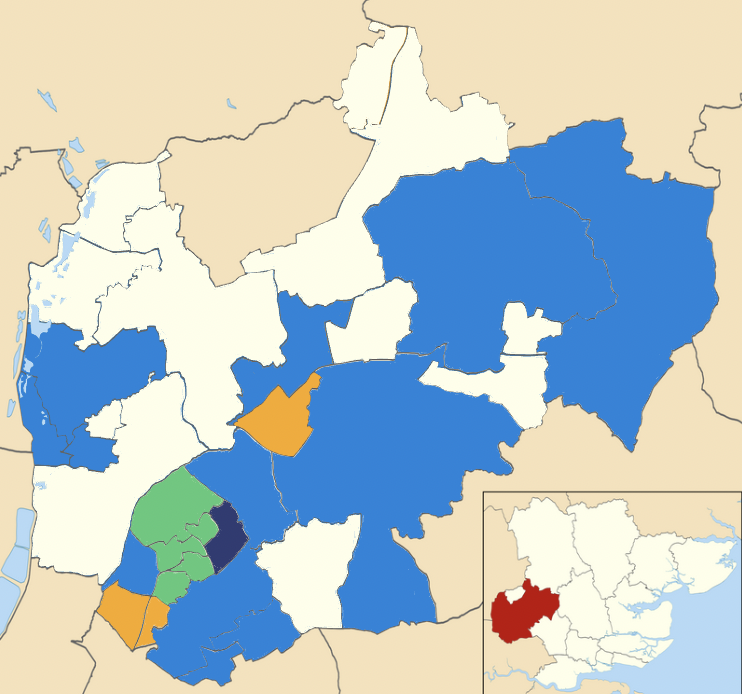
2008 results map

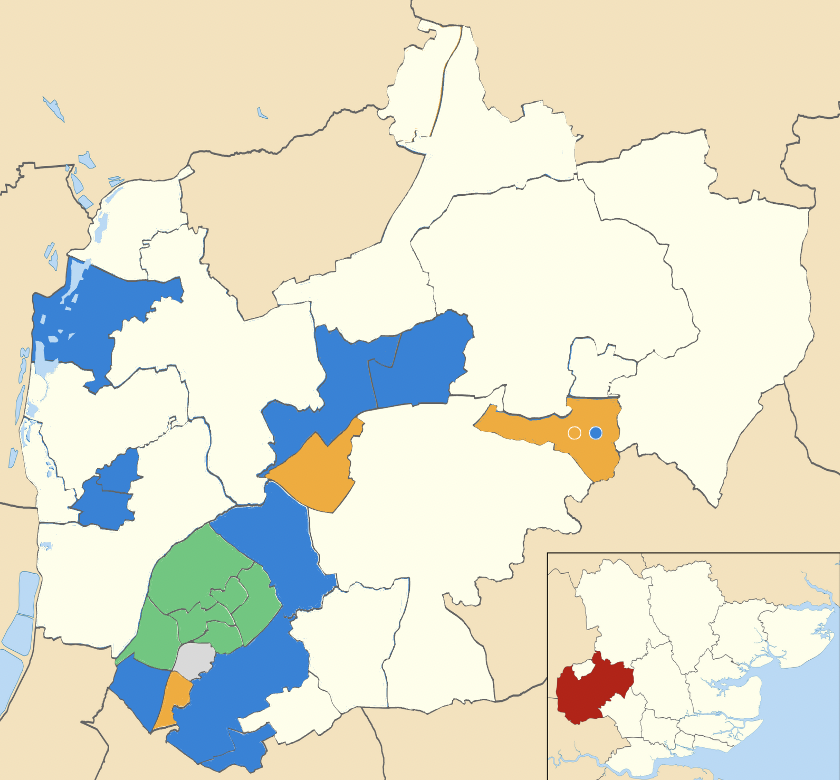
2010 results map

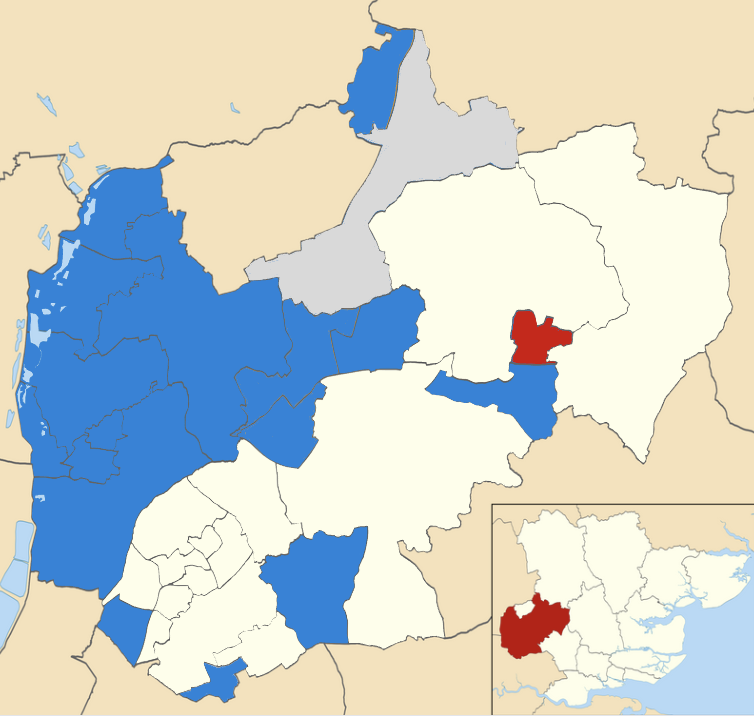
2011 results map

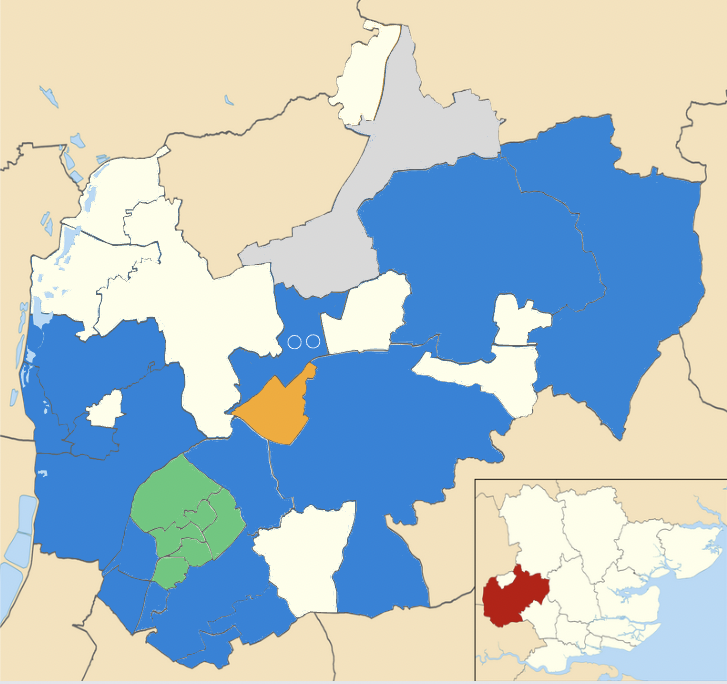
2012 results map

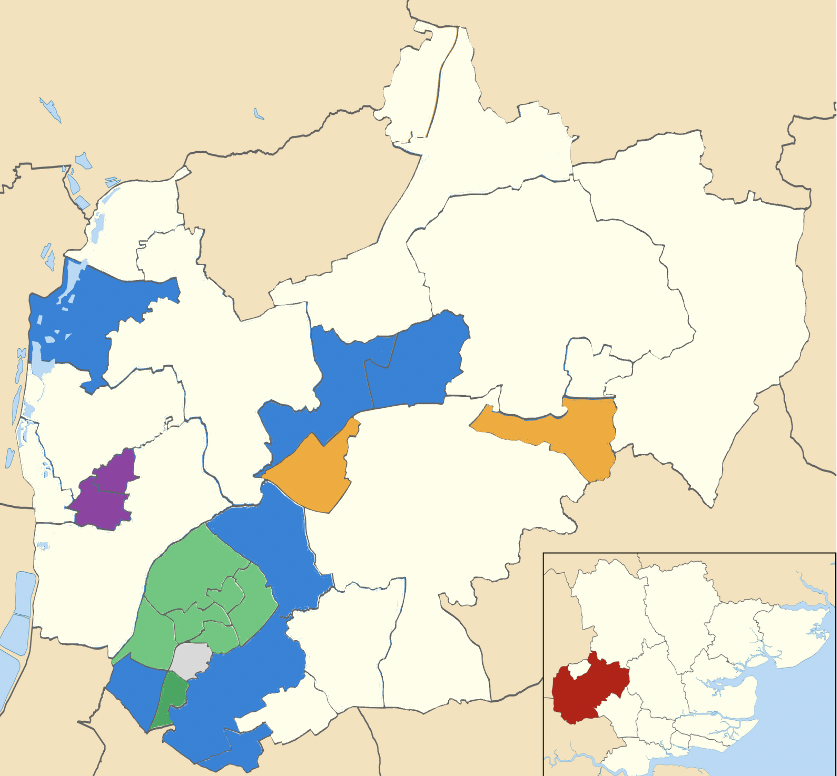
2014 results map

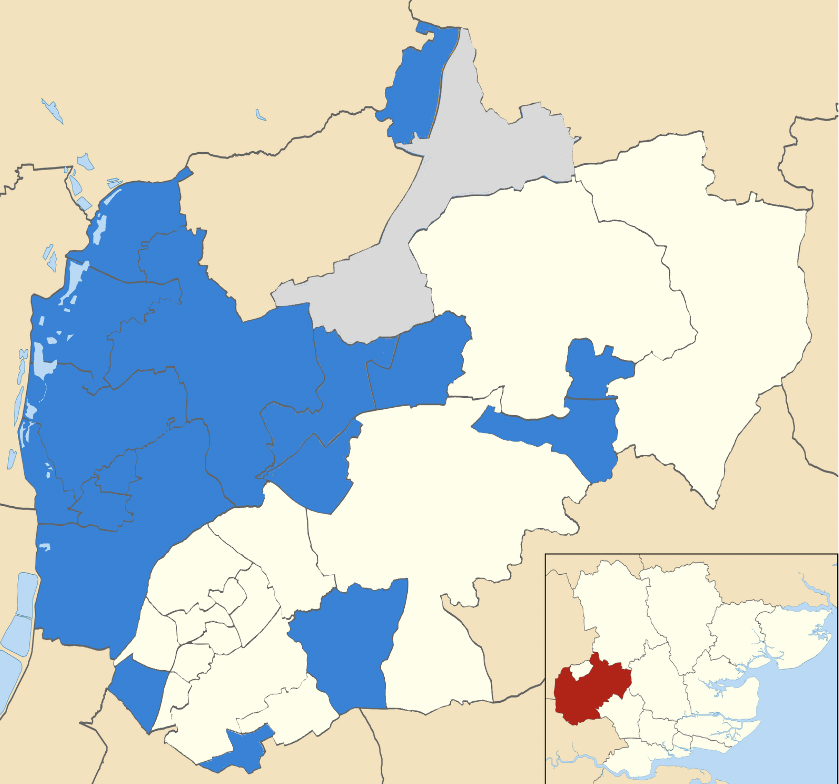
2015 results map

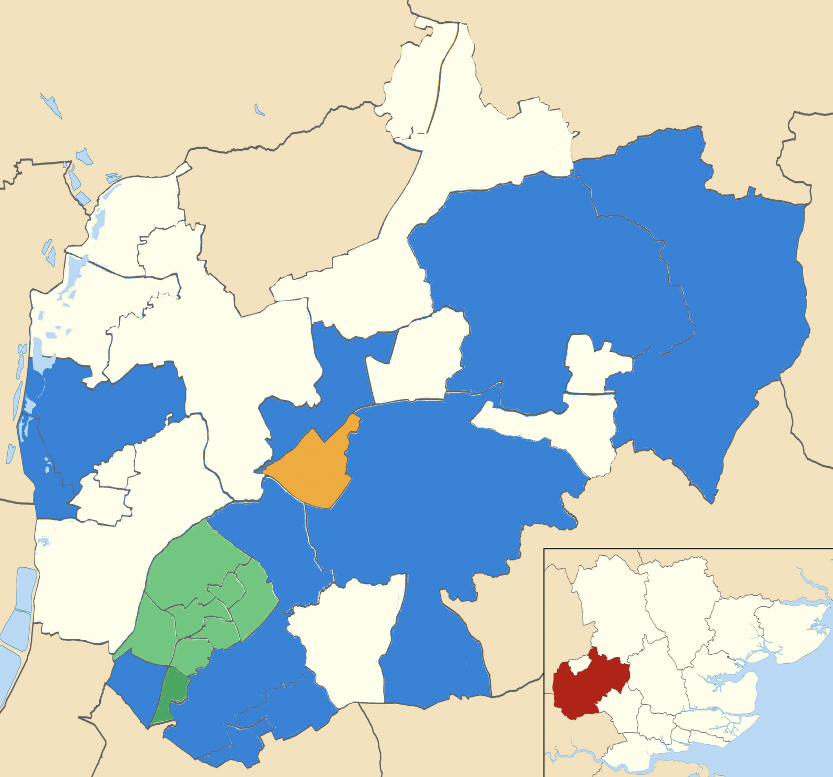
2016 results map

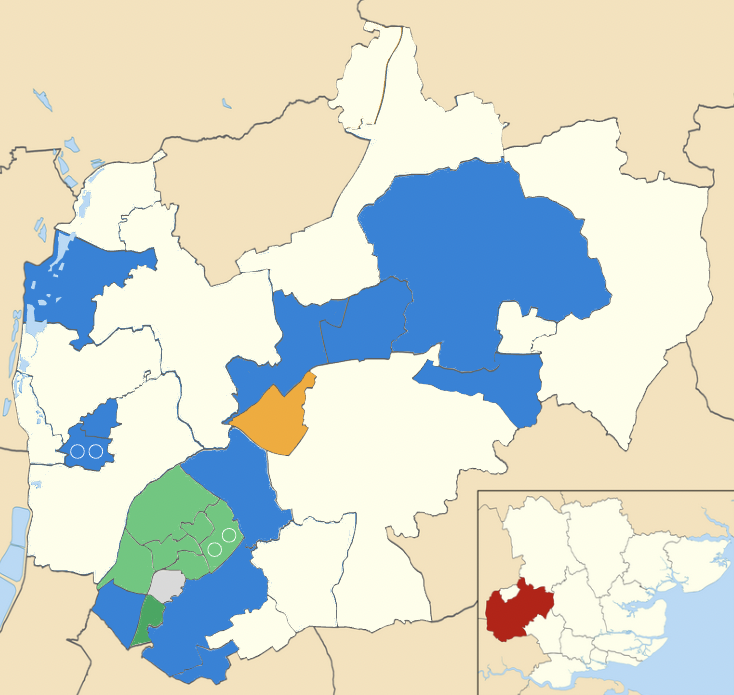
2018 results map

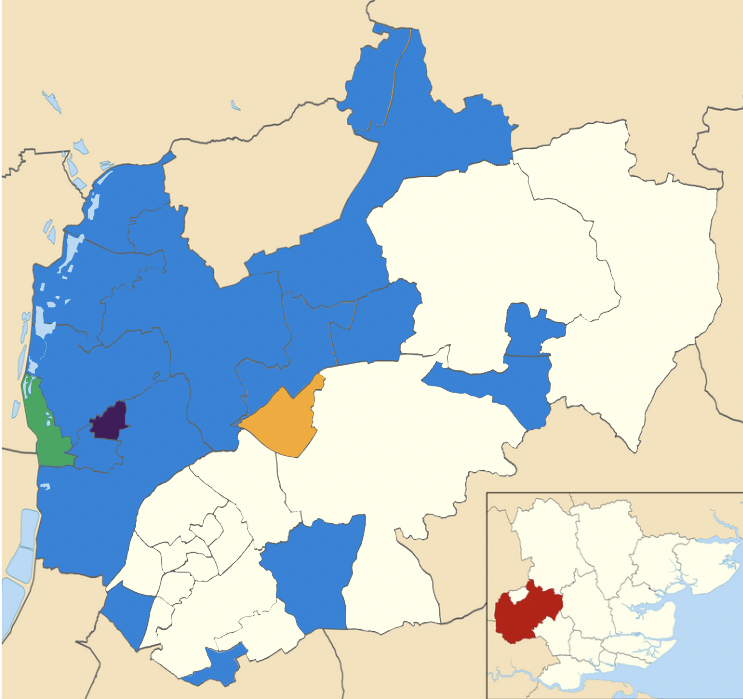
2019 results map

2021 results map

2022 results map

2023 results map

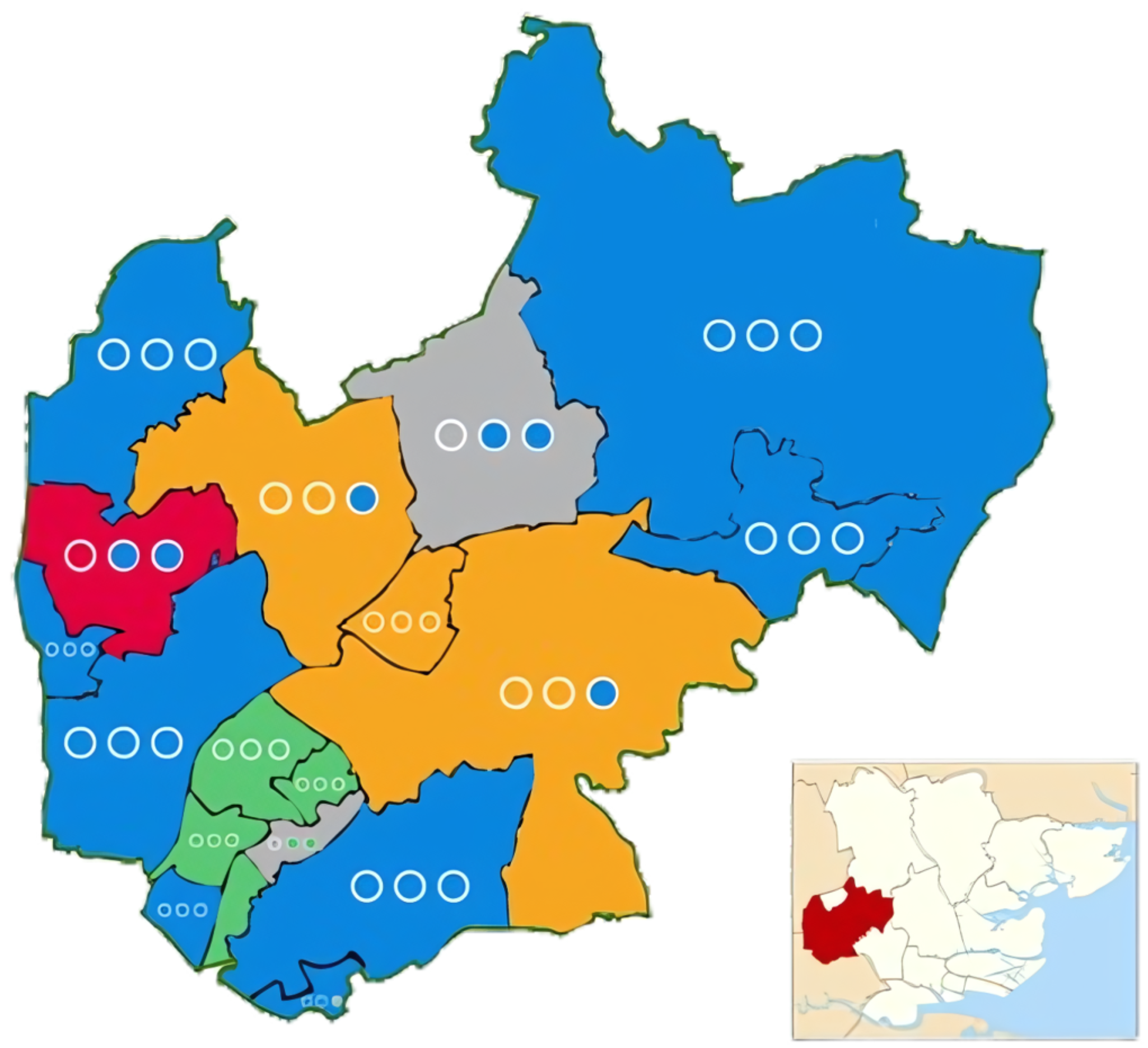
2024 results map

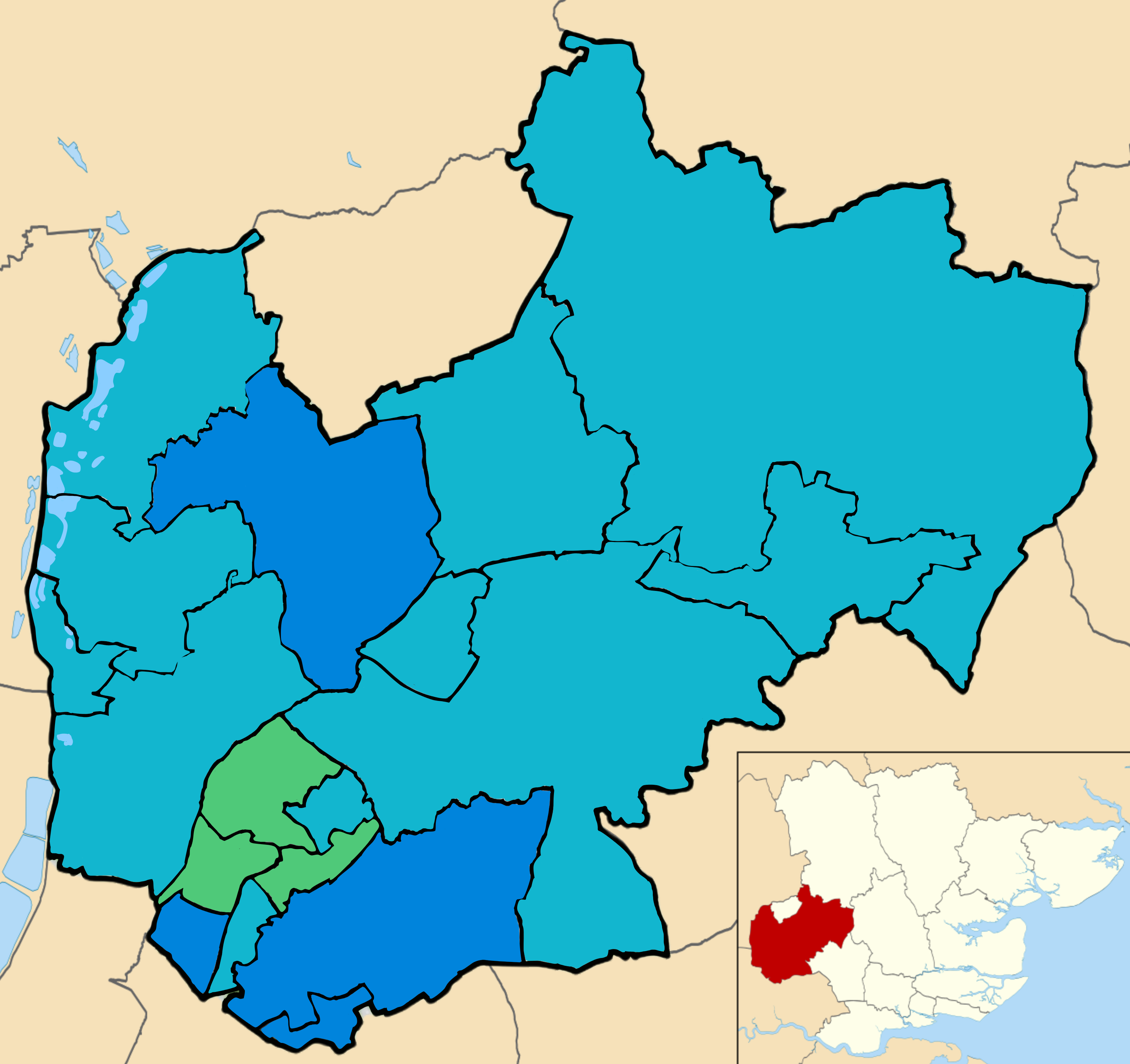
2026 results map

== By-elections ==
=== 1994-1998 ===
Buckhurst Hill West By-Election 1 May 1997
Party	Candidate	Votes	%	±%
Conservative		1,388	36.7	+5.5
Liberal Democrats		1,094	28.9	−31.4
Ratepayer		991	26.2	+26.2
Labour		309	8.2	−0.3
Majority		294	7.8	
Turnout		3,782	74.7	
Conservative gain from Liberal Democrats		Swing		

Theydon Bois By-Election 1 May 1997
Party	Candidate	Votes	%	±%
Conservative		1,018	42.2	+16.3
Independent		845	35.0	−8.9
Liberal Democrats		286	11.9	+1.7
Labour		263	10.9	−9.2
Majority		173	7.2	
Turnout		2,412	77.8	
Conservative gain from Independent		Swing		

Paternoster By-Election 3 July 1997
Party	Candidate	Votes	%	±%
Labour		274	47.9	−8.3
Conservative		253	44.3	+0.5
Liberal Democrats		44	7.7	+7.7
Majority		21	3.6	
Turnout		571	16.3	
Labour hold		Swing		

=== 1998-2002 ===
Waltham Abbey East By-Election 22 October 1998
Party	Candidate	Votes	%	±%
Conservative		633	60.2	+8.6
Labour		336	31.9	−9.9
Liberal Democrats		83	7.9	+1.3
Majority		297	28.3	
Turnout		1,052	18.2	
Conservative gain from Labour		Swing		

Sheering By-Election 25 February 1999
Party	Candidate	Votes	%	±%
Conservative		371	50.9	+23.3
Liberal Democrats		276	37.9	−10.4
Labour		82	11.2	−13.0
Majority		95	13.0	
Turnout		729	32.9	
Conservative gain from Liberal Democrats		Swing		

Grange Hill By-Election 24 June 1999
Party	Candidate	Votes	%	±%
Liberal Democrats		621	51.8	−3.1
Conservative		534	45.0	+8.7
Labour		43	3.6	−5.2
Majority		97	6.8	
Turnout		1,198		
Liberal Democrats hold		Swing		

Debden Green By-Election 11 November 1999
Party	Candidate	Votes	%	±%
Labour		514	68.8	−6.7
Conservative		138	18.5	−6.0
Independent		60	8.0	+8.0
Liberal Democrats		35	4.7	+4.7
Majority		376	50.3	
Turnout		747	19.2	
Labour hold		Swing		

Buckhurst Hill East By-Election 6 July 2000
Party	Candidate	Votes	%	±%
Liberal Democrats		711	69.2	+9.2
Conservative		245	23.9	−5.2
Labour		71	6.9	−3.4
Majority		466	46.0	
Turnout		1,027	31.4	
Liberal Democrats hold		Swing		

=== 2002-2006 ===
Waltham Abbey North East By-Election 7 November 2002
Party	Candidate	Votes	%	±%
Liberal Democrats	Pat Brooks	463	55.8	+27.5
Conservative	David Porter	321	38.7	−33.0
Labour	Fitzherbert Harewood	46	5.5	+5.5
Majority		142	17.1	
Turnout		830	25.7	
Liberal Democrats gain from Conservative		Swing		

Waltham Abbey South West By-Election 7 November 2002
Party	Candidate	Votes	%	±%
Liberal Democrats	Philip Chadburn	287	56.5	+26.7
Conservative	Margaret Williams	172	33.9	−36.3
Labour	Marion Taylor	49	9.6	+9.6
Majority		115	21.6	
Turnout		508	18.3	
Liberal Democrats gain from Conservative		Swing		

Lower Sheering By-Election 23 June 2005
Party	Candidate	Votes	%	±%
Conservative	Heather Harding	208	70.7	−1.4
Labour	Benjamin Slasberg	64	21.8	+21.8
Liberal Democrats	John Rumble	22	7.5	−20.4
Majority		144	48.9	
Turnout		294	18.5	
Conservative hold		Swing		

Chigwell Village By-Election 30 June 2005
Party	Candidate	Votes	%	±%
Conservative	Charles Scrutton	363	59.3	+12.5
Liberal Democrats	Alan Lion	249	40.7	+29.2
Majority		114	18.6	
Turnout		612	19.7	
Conservative hold		Swing		

=== 2006-2010 ===
Grange Hill By-Election 14 December 2006
Party	Candidate	Votes	%	±%
Conservative	Kewal Chana	609	39.4	−12.2
Liberal Democrats	Alan Lion	586	37.9	−4.9
BNP	Jacqueline Carne	302	19.5	+19.5
Labour	Roger Salmon	48	3.1	+3.1
Majority		23	1.5	
Turnout		1,545	32.8	
Conservative gain from Liberal Democrats		Swing		

Loughton Alderton By-Election 30 August 2007
Party	Candidate	Votes	%	±%
BNP	Tony Frankland	393	32.2	−5.4
Loughton Residents	Rose Brookes	367	30.1	+1.0
Liberal Democrats	Neil Woollcott	172	14.1	+10.5
Conservative	Edward Stacey	163	13.3	−3.1
Labour	Stephen Barnes	98	8.0	−5.2
UKIP	Andrew Smith	28	2.3	+2.3
Majority		26	2.1	
Turnout		1,221	36.7	
BNP hold		Swing		

Waltham Abbey Honey Lane By-Election 4 June 2009
Party	Candidate	Votes	%	±%
Conservative	Adam Clark	719	49.0	−7.3
BNP	Tony Frankland	372	25.4	+25.4
Liberal Democrats	Phil Chadburn	223	15.2	+15.2
Labour	Mitch Diamond-Conway	152	10.4	+7.3
Majority		347	23.6	
Turnout		1,466	32.0	
Conservative hold		Swing		

Grange Hill By-Election 8 October 2009
Party	Candidate	Votes	%	±%
Conservative	Alan Lion	453	52.4	−31.1
Liberal Democrats	Gavin Chambers	411	47.6	+31.1
Majority		42	4.8	
Turnout		864	17.2	
Conservative hold		Swing		

Lower Sheering By-Election 5 November 2009
Party	Candidate	Votes	%	±%
Conservative	Charlotte Edwards	302	76.5	+0.7
Liberal Democrats	Ingrid Black	93	23.5	−0.7
Majority		209	53.0	
Turnout		395	21.4	
Conservative hold		Swing		

=== 2010-2014 ===
Waltham Abbey Honey Lane By-Election 2 May 2013
Party	Candidate	Votes	%	±%
UKIP	Rod Butler	465	50.5	+50.5
Conservative	Christine Ball	455	49.5	−13.7
Majority		10	1.0	
Turnout		920		
UKIP gain from Conservative		Swing		

=== 2014-2018 ===
Broadley Common, Epping Upland and Nazeing By-Election 7 August 2014
Party	Candidate	Votes	%	±%
Conservative	Robert Glozier	155	50.5	−33.4
UKIP	Ron McEvoy	122	39.7	+39.7
Green	William Hartington	23	7.5	−2.4
Liberal Democrats	Arnold Verrall	7	2.3	−3.9
Majority		33	10.7	
Turnout		307		
Conservative hold		Swing		

Epping Hemnall By-Election 7 August 2014
Party	Candidate	Votes	%	±%
Liberal Democrats	Kim Adams	607	43.3	+0.8
Conservative	Nigel Avey	386	27.6	+6.5
UKIP	Andrew Smith	339	24.2	−1.4
Green	Anna Widdup	69	4.9	+0.5
Majority		221	15.8	
Turnout		1,401		
Liberal Democrats gain from Conservative		Swing		

Chigwell Village By-Election 23 February 2017
Party	Candidate	Votes	%	±%
Conservative	Darshan Singh Sunger	453	76.0	+0.9
Liberal Democrats	Joanne Alexander-Sefre	143	24.0	+24.0
Majority		310	52.0	
Turnout		596		
Conservative hold		Swing		

Lower Sheering By-Election 19 October 2017
Party	Candidate	Votes	%	±%
Conservative	Paul Stalker	220	80.9	+11.0
Liberal Democrats	Ingrid Black	52	19.1	+19.1
Majority		168	61.8	
Turnout		272		
Conservative hold		Swing		

=== 2022-2026 ===
Waltham Abbey South West By-Election 13 October 2022
Party	Candidate	Votes	%	±%
Conservative	Joseph Parsons	260	55.2	−13.9
Green	David Plummer	211	44.8	+39.6
Majority		49	10.4	
Turnout		471		
Conservative gain from Green		Swing		

== See also ==
- Politics of Loughton
