= 1994 Epping Forest District Council election =

UK local election

← 1992	5 May 1994	1995 →

19 out of 59 seats to Epping Forest District Council 30 seats needed for a majority

	First party	Second party	Third party
Party	Conservative	Labour	Loughton Residents
Last election	28 seats, 44.9%	14 seats, 19.1%	7 seats, 11.1%
Seats before	27	14	7
Seats after	23	15	7
Seat change	▼5	▲1	Steady
Popular vote	10,719	10,535	2,875
Percentage	33.8%	33.2%	9.0%
Swing	▼11.1%	▲14.1%	▼2.1%
	Fourth party	Fifth party	Sixth party
Party	Liberal Democrats	Epping Residents	SDP
Last election	2 seats, 8.2%	2 seats, 4.9%	3 seats, 8.2%
Seats before	3 (Note: Buckhurst Hill East councillor, S. Robinson defected from the SDP to the Liberal Democrats.)	3 (Note: Epping Lindsey councillor, June O'Brien resigned the whip earlier that year.)	2
Seats after	6	3	2
Seat change	▲4	▲1	▼1
Popular vote	5,419	1,445	111
Percentage	17.0%	4.5%	0.3%
Swing	▲8.8%	▼0.4%	▼7.9%
	Seventh party
Party	Ind. Conservative
Last election	1 seat, 0.2%
Seats before	1
Seats after	1
Seat change	Steady
Popular vote	590
Percentage	1.8%
Swing	▲1.6%
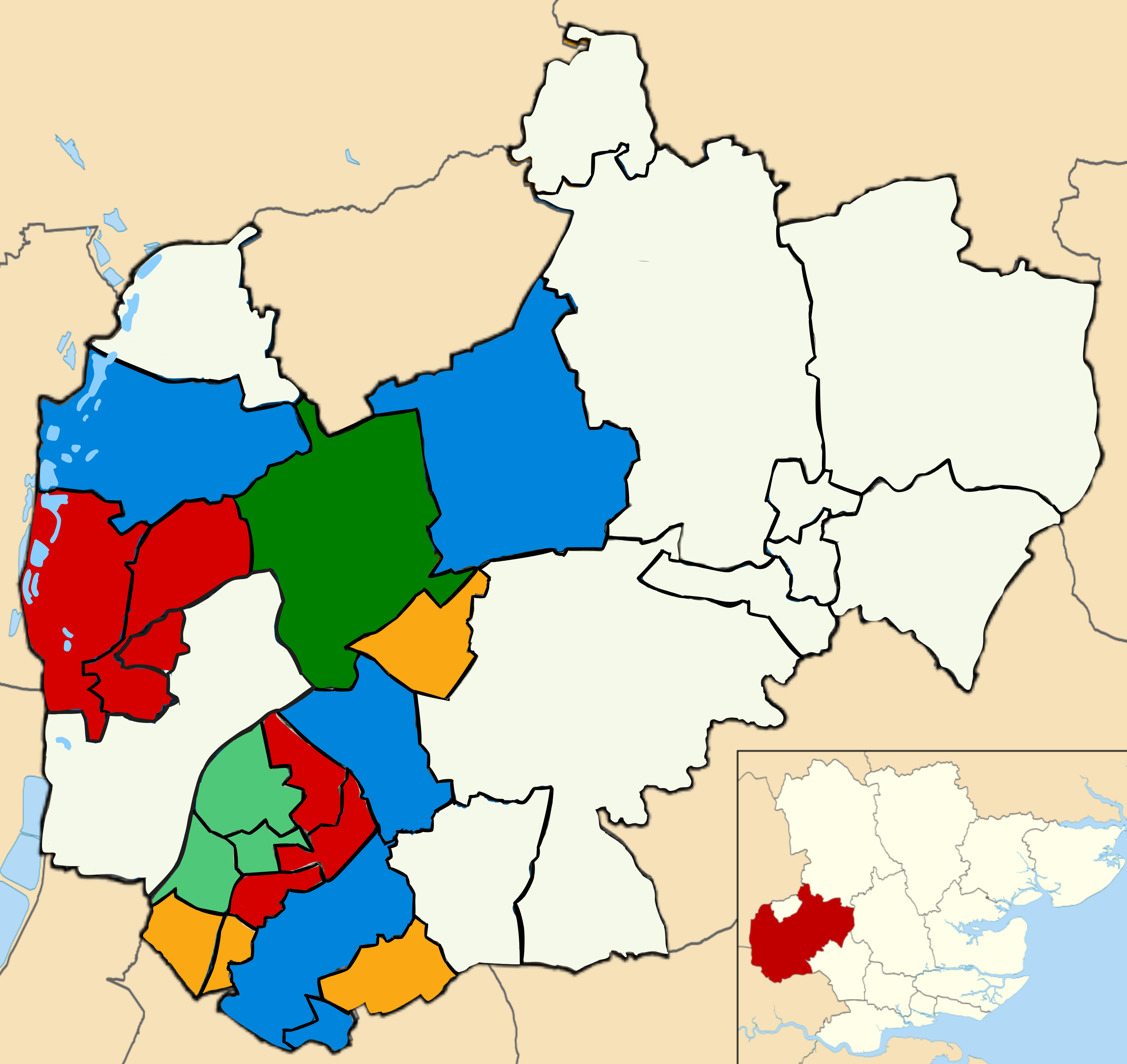
- Winner of each seat at the 1994 Epping Forest District Council election
Leader before election
Conservative minority administration
Leader after election
No overall control

The 1994 Epping Forest District Council election took place on 5 May 1994 to elect members of Epping Forest District Council in Essex, England. 19 members of Epping Forest District Council in Essex were elected. The council fell into no overall control with no party having control.

== Background ==
The 1994 Epping Forest District Council election took place in May 1994. Nationally, the Conservative government faced its lowest opinion poll ratings since coming to power in 1979, with Labour leading by a significant margin, sometimes of over 30%. The economy was recovering following the early 1990s recession, with unemployment falling to around 2.5 million by April.

Locally, the election marked a historic shift in Epping Forest politics. Labour recorded its best vote share in the district since 1980. The Conservatives suffered their lowest ever share of the vote and number of seats, winning only a handful of wards. For the first time, in no seat did the party win over 1,000 votes. These losses resulted in no overall control of the council, with no party holding a majority. Notably, the only seat that saw the Conservative vote share increase was North Weald Bassett.

The Loughton Residents Association (LRA) held firm, retaining seven seats and maintaining its influence in Loughton wards. Independent and Residents’ candidates also made gains, including June O’Brien in Epping Lindsey, who left the Conservatives to join the Epping Residents Association and retained her seat. Meanwhile, the Liberal Democrats achieved historic swings, particularly in Buckhurst Hill East (70.2%) and Buckhurst Hill West (61.2%), largely at the expense of the collapsing SDP, which fell to just 0.3% of the vote after Cllr Robinson, originally SDP, switched to the Liberal Democrats and successfully defended his seat leaving just Cllr Dunseath and Cllr Croke in the group.

The results reflected broader national trends of declining Conservative support and rising Labour and Liberal Democrat influence, while local parties such as the LRA continued to assert significant control in their wards. Turnout across the district ranged from around 37% to 52%, with some wards, such as Broadway, seeing high levels of engagement at 47.7%.

Overall, the 1994 election reshaped the council chamber, creating a fragmented assembly with Labour’s best performance in over a decade, Conservative losses at historic lows, and record-breaking gains for the Liberal Democrats in Epping Forest.

== Results summary ==
1994 Epping Forest District Council election
Party	This election			Full council			This election		
Party	Seats	Net	Seats %	Other	Total	Total %	Votes	Votes %	+/−
Conservative	5	▼5	26.3	18	23	38.9	10,719	33.8	▼11.1
Labour	6	▲1	31.5	9	15	25.4	10,535	33.2	▲14.1
Loughton Residents	3	Steady	15.7	4	7	11.8	2,875	9.0	▼2.1
Liberal Democrats	4	▲4	21.0	2	6	10.1	5,419	17.0	▲8.8
Epping Residents	1	▲1	5.2	2	3	5.0	1,445	4.5	▼0.4
Independent	0	Steady	0.0	2	2	3.2	N/A	N/A	N/A
SDP	0	▼1	0.0	2	2	3.2	111	0.3	▼7.9
Ind. Conservative	0	Steady	0.0	1	1	1.6	590	1.8	▲1.6

== Ward results ==
=== Buckhurst Hill East ===
Buckhurst Hill East
Party	Candidate	Votes	%	±%
Liberal Democrats	S. Robinson*	1,362	70.2	▲58.6
Conservative	A. Torgut	293	15.1	▼14.0
Labour	D. Wing	209	10.8	▲1.8
SDP	Ms E. Hobbs	76	3.9	▼46.4
Majority		1,069	55.1	N/A
Turnout		1,940	49.1	▲5.2
Registered electors		3,952		
Liberal Democrats gain from SDP		Swing		

=== Buckhurst Hill West ===
Buckhurst Hill West
Party	Candidate	Votes	%	±%
Liberal Democrats	A. Thompson	1,435	61.2	▲52.8
Conservative	D. Russell	784	33.4	▼12.9
Labour	S. Miller	92	3.9	N/A
SDP	R. Arnold	35	1.5	▼43.8
Majority		651	27.7	▲26.7
Turnout		2346	47.9	▲7.8
Registered electors		4,903		
Liberal Democrats gain from Conservative		Swing		

=== Chigwell Row ===
Chigwell Row
Party	Candidate	Votes	%	±%
Liberal Democrats	M. Allen	412	51.1	▲19.5
Conservative	R. Pratt*	394	48.9	▼19.5
Majority		18	2.2	N/A
Turnout		806	47.1	▲1.1
Registered electors		1,713		
Liberal Democrats gain from Conservative		Swing		

=== Chigwell Village ===
Chigwell Village
Party	Candidate	Votes	%	±%
Conservative	J. Murphy*	755	60.0	▼19.5
Liberal Democrats	D. Jenkinson	334	26.6	▲12.0
Labour	C. Newbury	169	13.4	N/A
Majority		421	33.5	▼31.4
Turnout		1,258	39.0	▲8.0
Registered electors		3,227		
Conservative hold		Swing		

=== Debden Green ===
Debden Green
Party	Candidate	Votes	%	±%
Labour	S. Barnes	1,126	74.2	▲6.3
Conservative	L. Daniel	392	25.8	▼6.3
Majority		734	48.4	▲12.6
Turnout		1,518	39.5	▲9.8
Registered electors		3,848		
Labour hold		Swing		

=== Epping Hemnall ===
Epping Hemnall
Party	Candidate	Votes	%	±%
Liberal Democrats	A. Boydon	665	32.0	▲22.8
Conservative	J. Ashbridge*	605	29.1	▼19.5
Epping Residents	J. Solomons	482	23.2	▼4.6
Labour	D. Sturrock	329	15.8	▲1.5
Majority		60	2.9	N/A
Turnout		2,081	45.0	▲9.2
Registered electors		4,626		
Liberal Democrats gain from Conservative		Swing		

=== Epping Lindsey ===
Epping Lindsey
Party	Candidate	Votes	%	±%
Epping Residents	J. O'Brien*	963	44.8	▲6.5
Conservative	P. Jones	493	23.0	▼13.5
Labour	B. Johns	411	19.1	▲4.1
Liberal Democrats	S. Mann	281	13.1	▲3.0
Majority		470	21.9	N/A
Turnout		2,148	44.9	▲8.7
Registered electors		4,784		
Epping Residents Association gain from Conservative		Swing		

=== Grange Hill ===
Grange Hill
Party	Candidate	Votes	%	±%
Conservative	D. Bateman	818	46.4	▼14.6
Liberal Democrats	P. Spencer	706	40.1	▲7.7
Labour	M. Scott	238	13.5	▲6.9
Majority		112	6.4	▼22.2
Turnout		1,762	38.4	▼5.6
Registered electors		4,591		
Conservative hold		Swing		

=== Loughton Broadway ===
Loughton Broadway
Party	Candidate	Votes	%	±%
Labour	S. Murray*	1,594	82.1	▲10.7
Conservative	S. Metcalfe	348	17.9	▼10.7
Majority		1,246	64.2	▲21.4
Turnout		1942	47.7	▲11.7
Registered electors		4,072		
Labour hold		Swing		

=== Loughton Forest ===
Loughton Forest
Party	Candidate	Votes	%	±%
Loughton Residents	R. Gow*	792	62.8	▲7.6
Conservative	I. Locks	302	23.9	▼14.9
Labour	J. Ormston	168	13.3	▲7.4
Majority		490	38.8	▲22.4
Turnout		1,262	43.2	▲0.2
Registered electors		2,921		
Loughton Residents hold		Swing		

=== Loughton Roding ===
Loughton Roding
Party	Candidate	Votes	%	±%
Labour	A. Larner*	973	50.0	▲3.9
Loughton Residents	B. Moore	448	23.0	▼0.9
Conservative	E. Buttling	300	15.4	▼14.8
Liberal Democrats	N. Macy	224	11.5	N/A
Majority		525	27.0	▲11.2
Turnout		1,945	52.4	▲8.6
Registered electors		3,710		
Labour hold		Swing		

=== Loughton St. Johns ===
Loughton St. Johns
Party	Candidate	Votes	%	±%
Loughton Residents	F. Silver	855	51.4	▼1.7
Conservative	C. Finn	482	28.9	▼5.6
Labour	R. Larner	328	19.7	▲7.4
Majority		373	22.4	▲3.8
Turnout		1,665	40.0	▲5.1
Registered electors		4,160		
Loughton Residents hold		Swing		

=== Loughton St. Marys ===
Loughton St. Marys
Party	Candidate	Votes	%	±%
Loughton Residents	R. Heath*	780	56.5	▼1.5
Labour	J. Barnett	330	23.9	▲9.1
Conservative	S. Englefield	270	19.6	▼7.6
Majority		450	32.6	▲1.8
Turnout		1,380	42.0	▲5.3
Registered electors		3,287		
Loughton Residents hold		Swing		

=== Nazeing ===
Nazeing
Party	Candidate	Votes	%	±%
Conservative	M. Welch*	700	42.6	▼22.8
Ind. Conservative	D. Borton	590	35.9	N/A
Labour	D. Martin	353	21.5	▼6.5
Majority		110	6.7	▼42.3
Turnout		1,643	47.0	▲2.2
Registered electors		3,497		
Conservative hold		Swing		

=== North Weald Bassett ===
North Weald Bassett
Party	Candidate	Votes	%	±%
Conservative	E. Hudspeth*	949	58.5	▲2.7
Labour	I. Standfast	674	41.5	▲15.7
Majority		275	16.9	▼13.1
Turnout		1,623	37.3	▼0.1
Registered electors		4,346		
Conservative hold		Swing		

=== Theydon Bois ===
Theydon Bois
Party	Candidate	Votes	%	±%
Conservative	J. Padfield*	886	66.9	▼9.8
Labour	D. Miller	439	33.1	N/A
Majority		447	33.7	▼19.7
Turnout		1,325	41.8	▲7.2
Registered electors		3,168		
Conservative hold		Swing		

=== Waltham Abbey East ===
Waltham Abbey East
Party	Candidate	Votes	%	±%
Labour	B. Sumner	1,247	57.5	▲23.7
Conservative	W. Ransom	923	42.5	▼23.7
Majority		324	14.9	N/A
Turnout		2,170	40.2	▲6.4
Registered electors		5,401		
Labour gain from Conservative		Swing		

=== Waltham Abbey Paternoster ===
Waltham Abbey Paternoster
Party	Candidate	Votes	%	±%
Labour	S. Riley	882	64.4	▲7.6
Conservative	L. Rowley	488	35.6	▼7.6
Majority		394	28.8	▲15.2
Turnout		1,370	39.1	▼0.1
Registered electors		3,504		
Labour hold		Swing		

=== Waltham Abbey West ===
Waltham Abbey West
Party	Candidate	Votes	%	±%
Labour	P. Pennell*	973	64.4	▲21.1
Conservative	D. Esau	537	35.6	▼21.1
Majority		436	28.9	N/A
Turnout		1,510	39.1	▼0.6
Registered electors		3,865		
Labour hold		Swing		
