= 2007 Epping Forest District Council election =

2007 UK local government election

- 3 May 2007

17 of 58 seats on Epping Forest District Council 30 seats needed for a majority
- Turnout: 34.3 (▼9.5%)

	First party	Second party	Third party
Leader	Diana Collins	Jon Whitehouse	Patricia Richardson
Party	Conservative	Liberal Democrats	BNP
Leader's seat	Passingford	Epping Hemnall	Loughton Fairmead
Last election	29 seats, 43.9%	13 seats, 25.8%	6 seats, 5.6%
Seats before	30	12	6
Seats won	32	11	6
Seat change	▲3	▼2	Steady
Popular vote	10,331	4,516	1,093
Percentage	57.0%	24.9%	6.0%
Swing	▲13.1%	▼0.9%	▲0.4%
	Fourth party	Fifth party	Sixth party
Leader	Peter House	N/A	Peter Gode
Party	Loughton Residents	Independent inc. CRA	Labour
Leader's seat	Loughton Forest	N/A	Shelley
Last election	5 seats, 9.7%	4 seats, 3.8%	1 seat, 5.6%
Seats before	5	4	1
Seats won	5	3 (Note: John Knapman (CRA - Chigwell Village), Richard Morgan (Hastingwood, Matching and Sheering Village), and Stephen Murray (Loughton Roding))	1
Seat change	N/A	▼1	Steady
Popular vote	N/A	510	883
Percentage	N/A	2.3%	4.9%
Swing	N/A	▼5.7%	▼0.7%
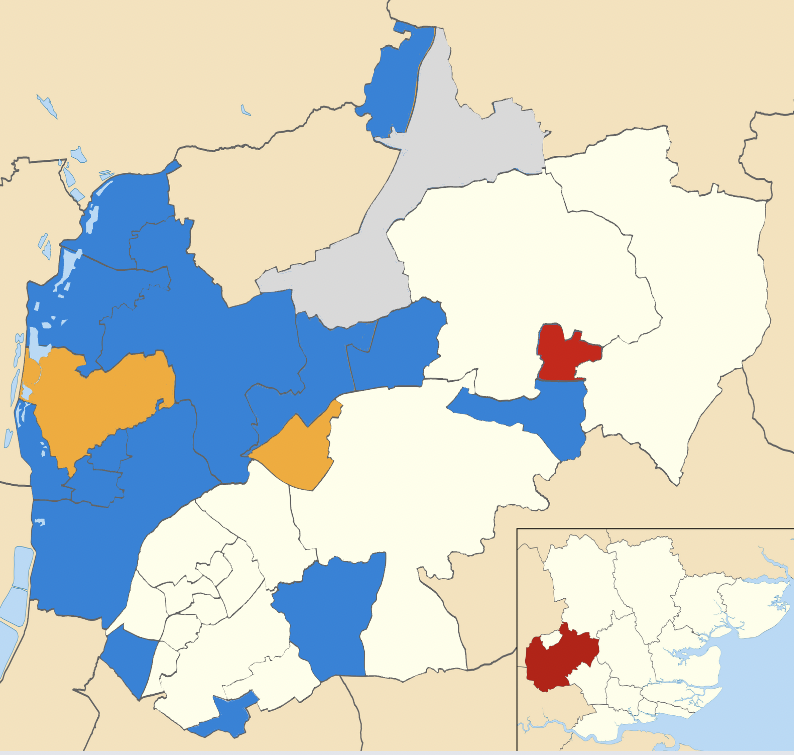
- Results of the 2007 District Council elections

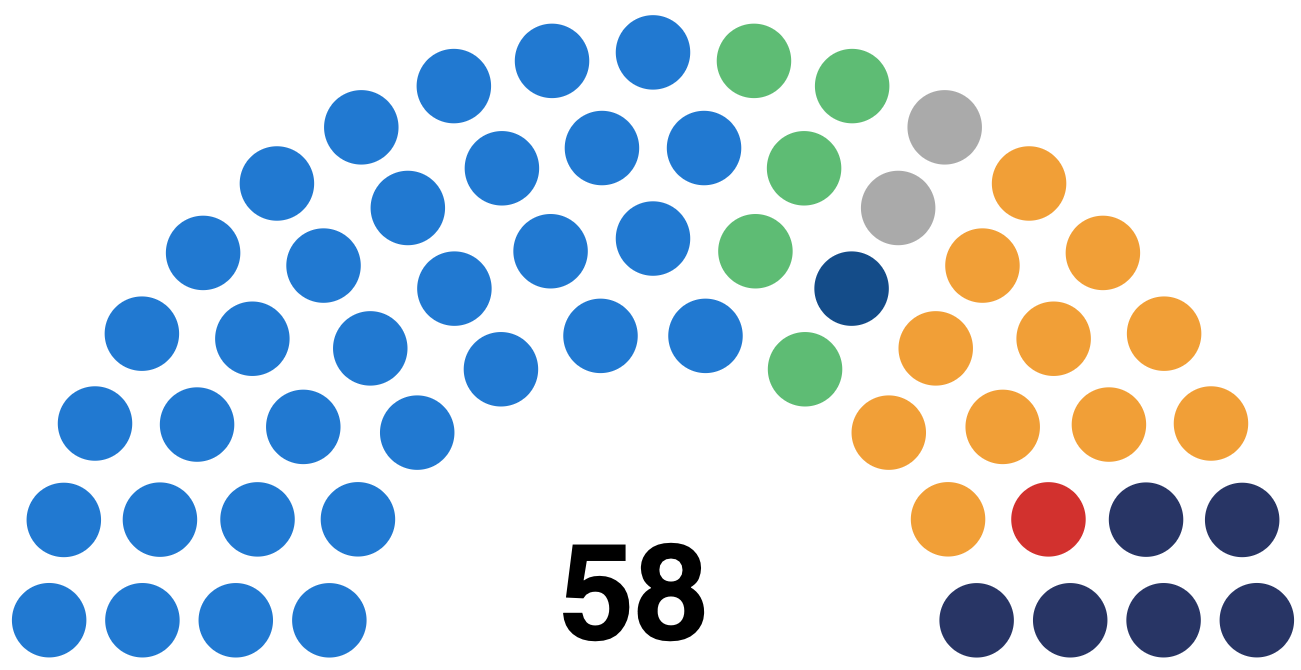
- Council composition following the election
Council control before election
Conservative
Council control after election
Conservative

Elections to Epping Forest Council were held on 3 May 2007 in Essex, England. One third of the council was up for election and the Conservative Party regained overall control of the council, thanks initially to a by-election in Grange Hill in December 2006, and then following gains at this election.

The British National Party retained all its representation on the council with 6 seats, and marginally increased its vote share. The remaining Labour councillor, Peter Gode of Shelley retained his seat, albeit with a significantly reduced majority. The Conservatives, following gains from the Liberal Democrats regained control of the council having last had control in 1994. One Independent lost their seat to the Conservatives, leaving two remaining on the council.

This election saw the Epping Community Action Group come third in both Epping wards. The party, registered in 2005, ran on a pledge to rejuvenate Epping high street and save small shops by relaxing parking laws. It opposed fortnightly collection of household rubbish and committed to not build on green belt land. Run by Ian Anderson, a former leader of the National Front between 1990 and 1995. Anderson's local party also committed to re-open the local adult learning centre and to stop the town centre becoming an "endless parade of chain coffeehouses and takeaways". Neither Epping candidates, including Anderson won seats, causing the party to dissolve.

Due to no Loughton seats being contested in this cycle, no Loughton Residents Association councillors were up for election, and hence did not change in number.

== By-elections ==
=== Grange Hill by-election ===
This by-election win by the Conservatives gave the party council control for the first time since 1994.

Grange Hill by-election 14 December 2006
Party	Candidate	Votes	%	±%
Conservative	Kewal Chana	609	39.4	▼12.2
Liberal Democrats	Alan Lion	586	37.9	▼4.9
BNP	Jacqueline Carne	302	19.5	N/A
Labour	Roger Salmon	48	3.1	▲3.1
Majority		23	1.5	▲6.3
Turnout		1,545	32.8	▼5.2
Conservative gain from Liberal Democrats		Swing		

== Ward results ==
=== Broadley Common, Epping Upland & Nazeing ===
Broadley Common, Epping Upland & Nazeing
Party	Candidate	Votes	%	±%
Conservative	Penny Smith	481	86.2	▲0.5
Liberal Democrats	Arnold Verrall	77	13.8	▼0.5
Majority		404	72.4	▲1.0
Turnout		558	34.7	▲5.2
Conservative hold		Swing		

=== Buckhurst Hill West ===
Buckhurst Hill West
Party	Candidate	Votes	%	±%
Conservative	Haluk Ulkun	1,003	58.4	▲19.7
Liberal Democrats	Mick Spence	714	41.6	▼19.7
Majority		289	16.8	▼5.8
Turnout		1,717	33.0	▼9.7
Conservative hold		Swing		

=== Chipping Ongar, Greensted and Marden Ash ===
Chipping Ongar, Greensted and Marden Ash
Party	Candidate	Votes	%	±%
Conservative	Glyn Pritchard	572	44.6	▲7.3
Liberal Democrats	Keith Wright	478	37.3	▼2.0
English Democrat	Robin Tilbrook	233	18.2	▲1.6
Majority		94	7.3	▲5.3
Turnout		1,283	41.1	▼6.7
Conservative gain from Liberal Democrats		Swing		

=== Epping Hemnall ===
Epping Hemnall
Party	Candidate	Votes	%	±%
Liberal Democrats	Janet Hedges	812	39.2	▼10.5
Conservative	Susan Perry	802	38.7	▼6.3
Epping Community Action Group	Ian Anderson	215	10.4	N/A
BNP	Alexander Copland	147	7.1	N/A
Labour	Paul Handford	95	4.6	▼0.7
Majority		10	0.5	▼4.2
Turnout		2,071	43.0	▼4.5
Liberal Democrats gain from Conservative		Swing		

=== Epping Lindsey and Thornwood Common ===
Epping Lindsey and Thornwood Common
Party	Candidate	Votes	%	±%
Conservative	Andrew Green	930	48.9	▼9.7
Liberal Democrats	Ingrid Black	497	26.1	▼4.4
Epping Community Action Group	Audrey Wheeler	295	15.5	N/A
BNP	Tony Frankland	181	9.5	N/A
Majority		433	22.8	▼5.3
Turnout		1,903	40.3	▲2.0
Conservative hold		Swing		

=== Grange Hill ===
Grange Hill
Party	Candidate	Votes	%	±%
Conservative	Kewal Chana	813	62.2	▲10.6
Liberal Democrats	Dev Dodeja	387	29.6	▼13.2
Labour	Martin Lawford	107	8.2	N/A
Majority		426	32.6	▲23.8
Turnout		1,307	27.7	▼10.3
Conservative gain from Liberal Democrats		Swing		

=== Lambourne ===
Lambourne
Party	Candidate	Votes	%	±%
Conservative	Brian Rolfe	518	85.6	▲24.1
Liberal Democrats	Neil Woollcott	87	14.4	N/A
Majority		431	71.2	▲48.2
Turnout		605	38.8	▼9.8
Conservative hold		Swing		

=== Lower Nazeing ===
Lower Nazeing
Party	Candidate	Votes	%	±%
Conservative	Richard Bassett	631	52.7	▼3.6
Independent	Daphne Borton	419	35.0	▲2.2
UKIP	Martin Harvey	88	7.3	N/A
Labour	Kelvin Morris	60	5.0	▼1.5
Majority		212	17.7	▼5.8
Turnout		1,198	37.6	▼4.9
Conservative gain from Independent		Swing		

=== Lower Sheering ===
Lower Sheering
Party	Candidate	Votes	%	±%
Conservative	Heather Harding	409	75.7	▲3.6
Liberal Democrats	Eleonor Spencer	131	24.3	▼3.6
Majority		278	51.4	▲7.2
Turnout		540	32.6	▲13.1
Conservative hold		Swing		

=== North Weald Bassett ===
North Weald Bassett
Party	Candidate	Votes	%	±%
Conservative	Anne Grigg	887	82.1	▼0.3
Liberal Democrats	John Rumble	193	17.9	▲0.3
Majority		694	64.2	▼0.6
Turnout		1,080	31.4	▼4.2
Conservative hold		Swing		

=== Roydon ===
Roydon
Party	Candidate	Votes	%	±%
Conservative	Mary Sartin	476	75.8	▲0.1
Labour	Colin Riches	108	17.2	N/A
Liberal Democrats	Enid Robinson	44	7.0	N/A
Majority		368	58.6	▲7.2
Turnout		628	35.9	▲5.4
Conservative hold		Swing		

=== Shelley ===
Shelley
Party	Candidate	Votes	%	±%
Labour	Peter Gode	263	37.8	▼22.3
Conservative	Blane Judd	224	32.2	▲8.2
BNP	Lynne Turpin	163	23.4	N/A
English Democrat	Anne Palmer	46	6.6	N/A
Majority		39	5.6	▼30.5
Turnout		696	41.5	▲14.3
Labour hold		Swing		

=== Waltham Abbey High Beach ===
Waltham Abbey High Beach
Party	Candidate	Votes	%	±%
Conservative	Syd Stavrou	487	86.7	▼0.5
Liberal Democrats	Peter Fuller	75	13.3	▲0.5
Majority		412	73.4	▼1.0
Turnout		562	32.2	▲0.8
Conservative hold		Swing		

=== Waltham Abbey Honey Lane ===
Waltham Abbey Honey Lane
Party	Candidate	Votes	%	±%
Conservative	Antony Watts	636	57.8	▲9.3
Liberal Democrats	Peggy Ayre	240	21.8	▲7.9
BNP	Andrew Slade	225	20.4	N/A
Majority		396	36.0	▲5.8
Turnout		1,101	24.3	▼5.9
Conservative hold		Swing		

=== Waltham Abbey North East ===
Waltham Abbey North East
Party	Candidate	Votes	%	±%
Liberal Democrats	Pat Brooks	512	50.8	▲7.3
Conservative	Adam Clark	495	49.2	▼7.3
Majority		17	1.6	▼34.2
Turnout		1,007	32.0	▼3.8
Liberal Democrats hold		Swing		

=== Waltham Abbey Paternoster ===
Waltham Abbey Paternoster
Party	Candidate	Votes	%	±%
Conservative	Liz Webster	499	44.3	▼6.2
BNP	Gail Harvey	377	33.5	N/A
Labour	Mitchell Diamond-Conway	250	22.2	▲8.2
Majority		122	10.8	▼21.4
Turnout		1,126	34.1	▲4.6
Conservative hold		Swing		

=== Waltham Abbey South West ===
Waltham Abbey South West
Party	Candidate	Votes	%	±%
Conservative	Rikki Gadsby	468	63.5	▲9.2
Liberal Democrats	Phil Chadburn	269	36.5	▼9.2
Majority		199	27.0	▲18.4
Turnout		737	24.6	▼4.2
Conservative hold		Swing		
