= 1984 Epping Forest District Council election =

1984 UK local government election

← 1983	3 May 1984	1986 →

20 seats to Epping Forest District Council 30 seats needed for a majority

	First party	Second party	Third party
Party	Conservative	Labour	Loughton Residents
Last election	39 seats, 46.6%	13 seats, 27.1%	4 seats, 5.2%
Seats before	39	13	4
Seats after	36	12	6
Seat change	▼3	▼1	▲2
Popular vote	10,309	7,085	3,102
Percentage	40.2%	27.6%	12.1%
Swing	▼6.4%	▲0.5%	▲6.9%
	Fourth party	Fifth party
Party	Alliance	Independent
Last election	0 seats, 16.3%	2 seats, 1.3%
Seats before	0	2
Seats after	2	2
Seat change	▲2	Steady
Popular vote	3,772	1,259
Percentage	14.7%	4.9%
Swing	▼1.6%	▲3.6%
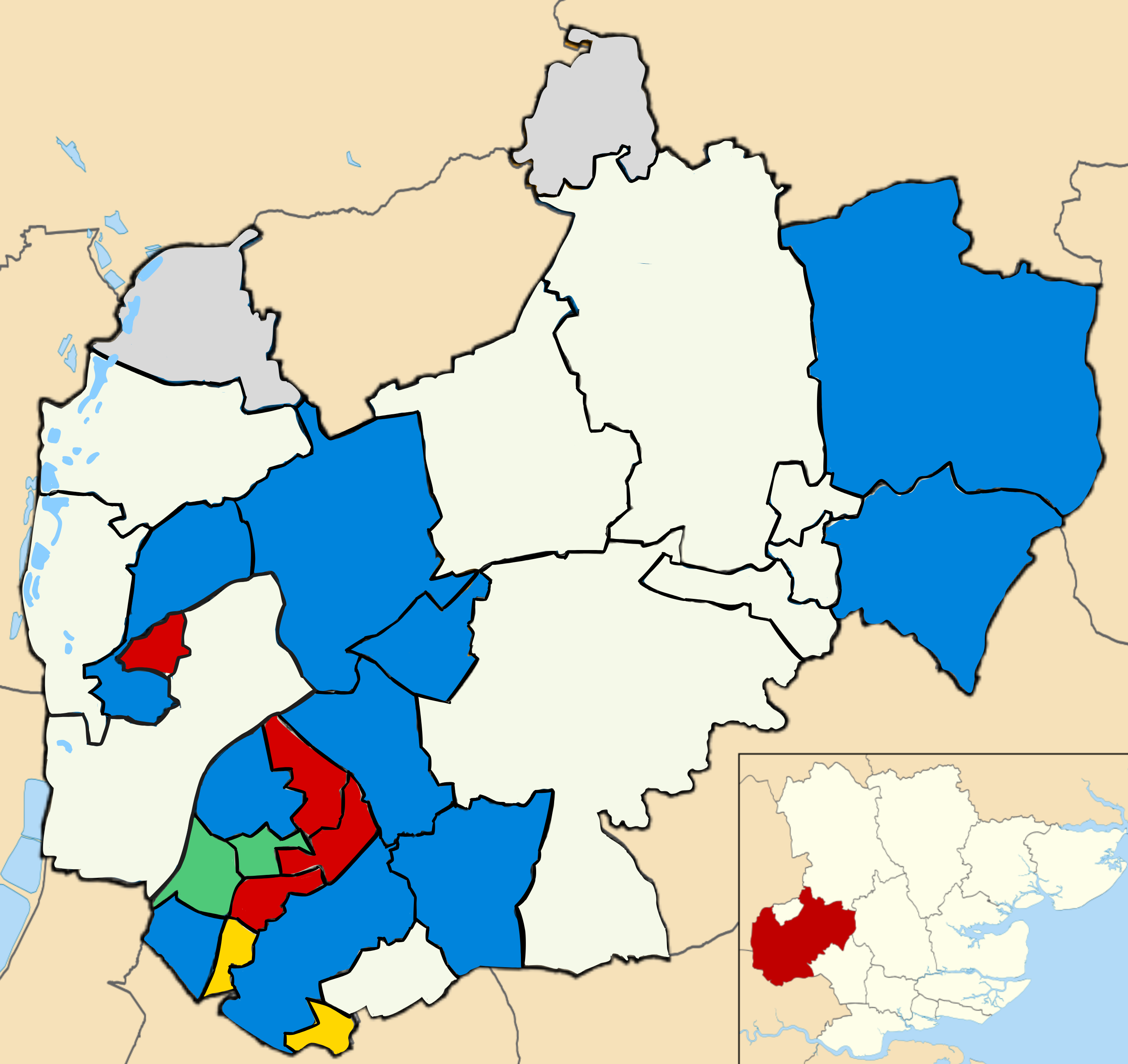
- Winner of each seat at the 1984 Epping Forest District Council election
Leader before election
Conservative
Leader after election
Conservative

The 1984 Epping Forest District Council election took place on 3 May 1984 to elect members of Epping Forest District Council in Essex, England. 20 members of Epping Forest District Council in Essex were elected. The council remained under Conservative majority control.

== Background ==
The 1984 Epping Forest District Council election was held on 3 May 1984 to elect members of Epping Forest District Council in Essex, England amid a turbulent year in Britain, marked by the miners’ strike, the Libyan Embassy Siege, and ongoing economic changes including the closure of Chatham Dockyard and the demonetisation of the halfpenny. The national mood was influenced by industrial unrest, technological progress such as the launch of the FTSE 100, and significant international developments, including Brunei's independence and Britain's diplomatic severing with Libya.

The Conservatives retained overall control of the council, but the political composition of the body became more diverse than ever before. For the first time, the SDP-Liberal Alliance won seats, reflecting the growing impact of the new centrist coalition on local politics. Their closest challenge came in Buckhurst Hill East and Grange Hill, highlighting an increasing appetite for alternatives to the traditional two-party dominance.

The Loughton Residents Association continued to expand, gaining a further two seats across Loughton wards and reinforcing its position as a localist force championing resident interests. Notably, Labour retained strongholds such as Broadway and Debden Green, demonstrating enduring support in certain wards despite national turbulence.

Voter turnout varied significantly across the district, with the highest engagement in wards such as High Ongar (59.2%) and the lowest in Passingford (29.7%). Overall, the election illustrated a more fragmented council, with five distinct groups—Conservatives, Labour, LRA, SDP-Liberal Alliance, and independents—represented, making 1984 the first year in Epping Forest council history with more than four groups holding seats simultaneously.

The results reflected both the stability of Conservative control and the growing influence of residents’ associations and the centrist Alliance, signalling a slow but steady diversification of local political representation in the district.

== Results summary ==
1984 Epping Forest District Council election
Party	This election			Full council			This election		
Party	Seats	Net	Seats %	Other	Total	Total %	Votes	Votes %	+/−
Conservative	10	▼3	50.0	26	36	61.0	10,309	40.2	▼6.4
Labour	4	Steady	6.7	8	12	20.3	7,085	27.6	▲0.5
Loughton Residents	2	▲1	3.3	4	6	10.1	3,102	12.1	▲6.9
Liberal	2	▲2	1.6	0	2	3.3	3,772	14.7	▼1.6
Independent	2	▲2	1.6	0	2	3.3	1,259	4.9	▲3.6
Ind. Conservative	0	Steady	0.0	1	1	1.6	N/A	N/A	N/A
Ecology	0	Steady	0.0	0	0	0.0	71	0.2	▼0.2

== Ward results ==
=== Buckhurst Hill East ===
Buckhurst Hill East
Party	Candidate	Votes	%	±%
Alliance	A. Thompson	605	41.8	▲18.5
Conservative	R. Braybrook*	579	40.0	▼12.4
Labour	S. Goodwin	263	18.2	▼6.2
Majority		26	1.8	N/A
Turnout		1,447	37.9	▲0.6
Registered electors		3,821		
Alliance gain from Conservative		Swing		

=== Buckhurst Hill West ===
Buckhurst Hill West
Party	Candidate	Votes	%	±%
Conservative	L. Welch*	1,010	65.9	▼4.4
Alliance	L. Martin	362	23.6	▲3.9
Labour	J. Base	160	10.4	▲0.4
Majority		648	42.3	▼8.3
Turnout		1,532	32.2	▼6.4
Registered electors		4,751		
Conservative hold		Swing		

=== Chigwell Village ===
Chigwell Village
Party	Candidate	Votes	%	±%
Conservative	N. Risdon*	641	69.2	▲6.8
Alliance	G. Hallett	226	24.4	▼5.8
Labour	P. Cook	59	6.4	▼1.0
Majority		415	44.8	▲12.7
Turnout		926	27.8	▼13.5
Registered electors		3,331		
Conservative hold		Swing		

=== Debden Green ===
Debden Green
Party	Candidate	Votes	%	±%
Labour	C. Huckle	939	68.2	▲2.3
Loughton Residents	M. Wardle	222	16.1	N/A
Conservative	J. Phillips	216	15.7	▼4.0
Majority		717	52.1	▲5.9
Turnout		1,377	36.9	▲1.0
Registered electors		3,734		
Labour hold		Swing		

=== Epping Hemnall ===
Epping Hemnall
Party	Candidate	Votes	%	±%
Conservative	M. Aldworth*	772	43.6	▼10.2
Labour	P. Speake	462	26.1	▲6.1
Alliance	J. Eves	320	18.1	▼5.4
Independent	J. Durrant	217	12.3	N/A
Majority		310	17.5	▼12.8
Turnout		1,771	38.8	▲8.5
Registered electors		4,560		
Conservative hold		Swing		

=== Epping Lindsey ===
Epping Lindsey
Party	Candidate	Votes	%	±%
Conservative	R. Pocock*	841	42.9	▼6.0
Alliance	K. Lees	560	28.6	▲0.3
Labour	D. Sturrock	487	24.9	▲5.4
Ecology	T. Broughton	71	3.6	▲0.3
Majority		281	14.3	▼6.3
Turnout		1,959	39.8	▼5.4
Registered electors		4,917		
Conservative hold		Swing		

=== Grange Hill ===
Grange Hill
Party	Candidate	Votes	%	±%
Alliance	M. Heavens	747	52.2	▲23.2
Conservative	M. Farnsworth*	578	40.4	▼19.8
Labour	J. Faiz	106	7.4	▼1.5
Majority		169	11.8	N/A
Turnout		1,431	30.7	▼6.0
Registered electors		4,665		
Alliance gain from Conservative		Swing		

=== High Ongar ===
High Ongar
Party	Candidate	Votes	%	±%
Conservative	D. Morton*	302	55.1	▼7.5
Alliance	S. Ormsby	127	23.2	N/A
Labour	K. Tait	119	21.7	▼15.7
Majority		175	31.9	▲6.7
Turnout		548	59.2	▲2.6
Registered electors		926		
Conservative hold		Swing		

=== Loughton Broadway ===
Loughton Broadway
Party	Candidate	Votes	%	±%
Labour	H. Worby	1,066	69.0	▲11.4
Conservative	I. Holman	245	15.8	▼3.8
Alliance	M. Pettman	235	15.2	▼7.6
Majority		821	53.2	▲18.4
Turnout		1,546	35.7	▼4.7
Registered electors		4,331		
Labour hold		Swing		

=== Loughton Forest ===
Loughton Forest
Party	Candidate	Votes	%	±%
Loughton Residents	H. Kleyn	744	54.0	▼0.9
Conservative	D. James*	518	37.6	▲4.0
Labour	A. Witham	62	4.5	▲0.3
Alliance	E. Fibbens	55	4.0	▼3.3
Majority		226	16.4	N/A
Turnout		1,379	48.5	▼2.3
Registered electors		2,841		
Loughton Residents gain from Conservative		Swing		

=== Loughton Roding ===
Loughton Roding
Party	Candidate	Votes	%	±%
Labour	R. Baddock*	795	42.2	▲9.9
Conservative	N. Hagger	464	24.6	▼4.6
Loughton Residents	R. Eveleigh	461	24.5	▼2.0
Alliance	M. Posen	164	8.7	▼3.3
Majority		331	17.6	▲14.6
Turnout		1,884	43.9	▼5.9
Registered electors		4,292		
Labour hold		Swing		

=== Loughton St. Johns ===
Loughton St. Johns
Party	Candidate	Votes	%	±%
Conservative	Ms J. Steele*	916	45.7	▲6.1
Loughton Residents	Ms K. Ellis	829	41.3	▼8.3
Labour	Ms M. Guy	181	9.0	▲0.9
Alliance	P. Richardson	80	4.0	▲1.4
Majority		87	4.3	▼5.7
Turnout		2,006	47.8	▲2.0
Registered electors		4,197		
Conservative hold		Swing		

=== Loughton St. Marys ===
Loughton St. Marys
Party	Candidate	Votes	%	±%
Loughton Residents	Ms D. Paddon	846	60.8	▲11.2
Conservative	Ms L. Scott*	366	26.3	▼13.3
Labour	C. Gunby	117	8.4	▲0.2
Alliance	A. Hall	62	4.5	▲1.9
Majority		480	34.5	N/A
Turnout		1,391	42.4	▼3.4
Registered electors		3,277		
Loughton Residents gain from Conservative		Swing		

=== Passingford ===
Passingford
Party	Candidate	Votes	%	±%
Conservative	J. Pledge*	357	78.6	▲3.6
Labour	D. Martin	97	21.4	▼3.6
Majority		260	57.3	▲7.3
Turnout		454	29.7	▼5.6
Registered electors		1,530		
Conservative hold		Swing		

=== Roothing Country ===
Roothing Country
Party	Candidate	Votes	%	±%
Conservative	Ms G. Green	403	85.6	▼2.9
Labour	J. Davy	68	14.4	▲2.9
Majority		335	71.1	▼5.8
Turnout		471	38.3	▼6.1
Registered electors		1,230		
Conservative hold		Swing		

=== Roydon ===
Roydon
Party	Candidate	Votes	%	±%
Independent	W. Easton	642	58.7	N/A
Labour	D. Grenville-Brown	451	41.3	▲22.2
Majority		191	17.5	N/A
Turnout		1,093	54.6	▼7.2
Registered electors		2,003		
Independent gain from Independent		Swing		

=== Sheering ===
Sheering
Party	Candidate	Votes	%	±%
Independent	M. Ridgewell	400	78.7	N/A
Labour	J. McColl	108	21.3	N/A
Majority		292	57.5	N/A
Turnout		508	29.8	▼9.2
Registered electors		1,705		
Independent gain from Independent		Swing		

=== Theydon Bois ===
Theydon Bois
Party	Candidate	Votes	%	±%
Conservative	W. Axon*	787	70.5	▼1.5
Alliance	O. Dunseath	229	20.5	▲1.7
Labour	F. Davy	100	9.0	▲2.5
Majority		558	50.0	▼4.2
Turnout		1,116	34.0	▼5.4
Registered electors		3,286		
Conservative hold		Swing		

=== Waltham Abbey East ===
Waltham Abbey East
Party	Candidate	Votes	%	±%
Conservative	Ms K Bellamy	813	52.8	▼4.6
Labour	D. Sherman	727	47.2	▲22.2
Majority		86	5.6	N/A
Turnout		1,540	32.1	▲0.1
Registered electors		4,802		
Conservative gain from Labour		Swing		

=== Waltham Abbey Paternoster ===
Waltham Abbey Paternoster
Party	Candidate	Votes	%	±%
Labour	B. Mooney	718	58.9	▲3.5
Conservative	J. Macdougall	501	41.1	▲4.6
Majority		217	17.8	▼0.9
Turnout		1,219	33.8	▼4.6
Registered electors		3,604		
Labour hold		Swing		
