= 1986 Epping Forest District Council election =

1986 UK local government election

← 1984	8 May 1986	1987 →

19 seats to Epping Forest District Council 30 seats needed for a majority

	First party	Second party	Third party
Party	Conservative	Labour	Loughton Residents
Last election	36 seats, 40.2%	12 seats, 27.6%	6 seats, 12.1%
Seats before	36	12	6
Seats after	34	12	6
Seat change	▼2	Steady	Steady
Popular vote	11,228	7,963	2,906
Percentage	40.6%	28.8%	10.5%
Swing	▲0.4%	▲1.2%	▼1.6%
	Fourth party	Fifth party
Party	Alliance	Independent
Last election	2 seats, 14.7%	2 seats, 4.9%
Seats before	2	2
Seats after	4	2
Seat change	▲2	Steady
Popular vote	5,340	109
Percentage	19.3%	0.3%
Swing	▲4.6%	▼4.6%
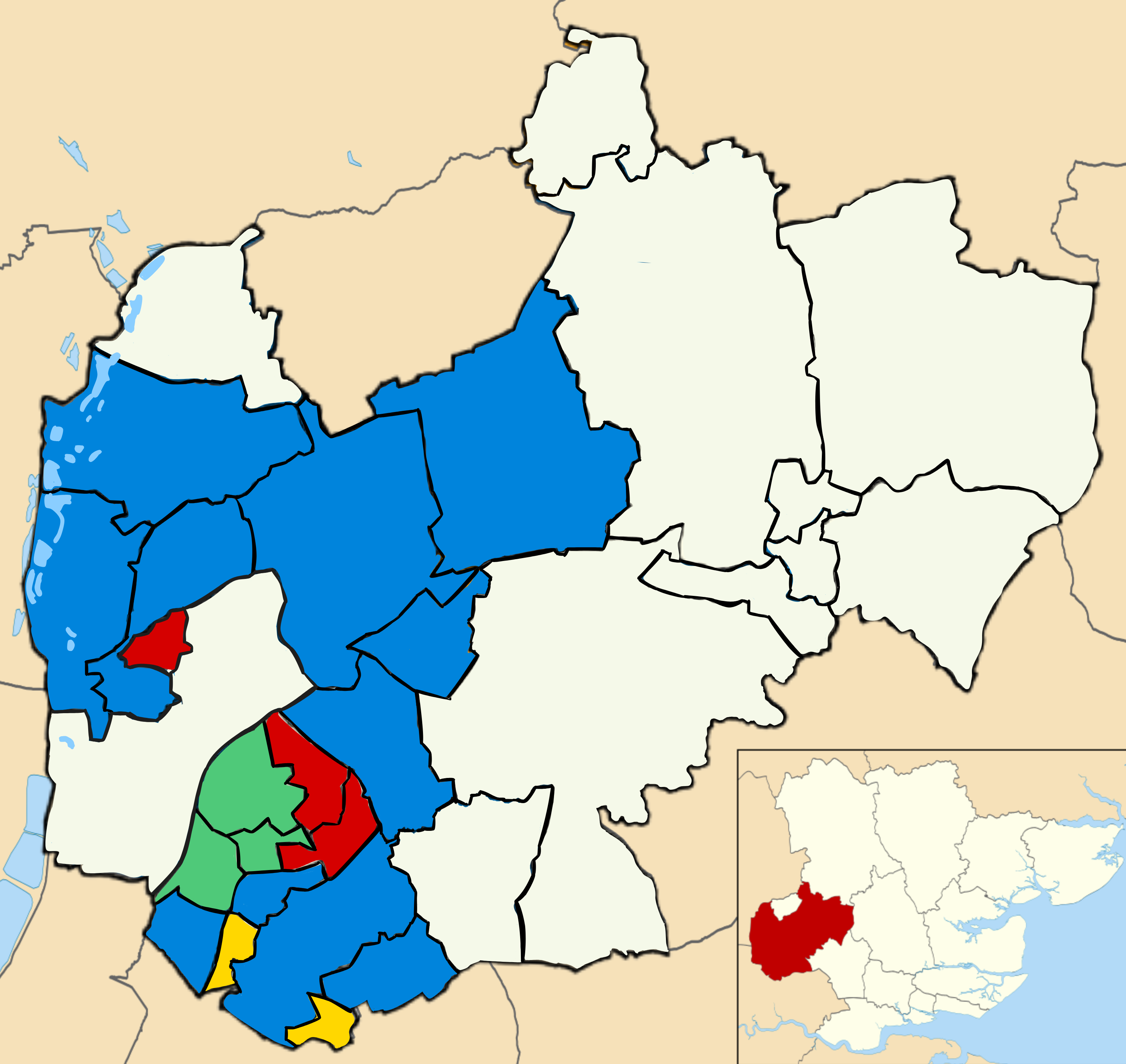
- Winner of each seat at the 1986 Epping Forest District Council election
Leader before election
Conservative
Leader after election
Conservative

The 1986 Epping Forest District Council election took place on 8 May 1986 to elect members of Epping Forest District Council in Essex, England. 19 members of Epping Forest District Council in Essex were elected. The council remained under Conservative majority control.

== Background ==
The 1986 Epping Forest District Council election was held on 8 May 1986 to elect members of Epping Forest District Council in Essex, England. The vote saw the Conservative Party retain overall control of the council, despite losing two seats to the SDP-Liberal Alliance, which doubled its representation and became an increasingly influential presence. The Loughton Residents Association continued its strong performance, holding key wards and maintaining its local influence. The election reflected a period of heightened political engagement locally, mirroring broader national trends, as voters reacted to both economic pressures and government controversies. Nationally, Britain was experiencing significant events, including the resignation of Michael Heseltine and Leon Brittan over the Westland affair, a postwar high in unemployment, and the first local elections following the abolition of the Greater London Council and metropolitan county councils. Industrial unrest was also prominent, exemplified by the ongoing Wapping dispute. Despite these challenges, the Conservatives managed to maintain control in Epping Forest, with the Liberals making incremental gains, highlighting the growing appeal of third-party alternatives during a turbulent political and economic period.

== Results summary ==
1986 Epping Forest District Council election
Party	This election			Full council			This election		
Party	Seats	Net	Seats %	Other	Total	Total %	Votes	Votes %	+/−
Conservative	11	▼2	57.8	23	34	57.6	11,228	40.6	▲0.4
Labour	3	Steady	15.7	9	12	20.3	7,963	28.8	▲1.2
Loughton Residents	3	Steady	15.7	3	6	10.1	2,906	10.5	▼1.6
Liberal	2	▲2	3.3	2	4	6.6	5,340	19.3	▲4.6
Independent	0	Steady	0.0	2	2	3.3	109	0.3	▼4.6
Ind. Conservative	0	Steady	0.0	1	1	1.6	N/A	N/A	N/A
National Front	0	Steady	0.0	0	0	0.0	71	0.2	N/A

== Ward results ==
=== Buckhurst Hill East ===
Buckhurst Hill East
Party	Candidate	Votes	%	±%
Alliance	M. Pettman	818	43.4	▲1.6
Conservative	G. Smith*	730	38.7	▼1.3
Labour	S. Goodwin	337	17.9	▼0.3
Majority		88	4.7	N/A
Turnout		1,885	49.4	▲11.5
Registered electors		3,815		
Alliance gain from Conservative		Swing		

=== Buckhurst Hill West ===
Buckhurst Hill West
Party	Candidate	Votes	%	±%
Conservative	R. Braybrook	934	50.7	▼15.2
Alliance	R. Eveling	715	38.8	▲15.6
Labour	L. Timson	192	10.4	Steady
Majority		219	11.9	▼31.3
Turnout		1,841	38.9	▲6.7
Registered electors		4,733		
Conservative hold		Swing		

=== Chigwell Row ===
Chigwell Row
Party	Candidate	Votes	%	±%
Conservative	A. McRoberts	381	49.4	▼13.0
Alliance	G. West	295	38.2	▲8.0
Labour	E. Robertson	96	12.4	▲5.0
Majority		86	11.1	▼21.0
Turnout		772	44.0	▲2.7
Registered electors		1,754		
Conservative hold		Swing		

=== Chigwell Village ===
Chigwell Village
Party	Candidate	Votes	%	±%
Conservative	B. Gunby*	696	58.6	▼10.6
Alliance	M. Austin	294	24.8	▲0.4
Independent	A. Marshall	109	9.2	N/A
Labour	P. Cook	88	7.4	▲1.0
Majority		402	33.9	▼10.9
Turnout		1,187	35.6	▲7.8
Registered electors		3,335		
Conservative hold		Swing		

=== Debden Green ===
Debden Green
Party	Candidate	Votes	%	±%
Labour	R. Steele	1,106	65.9	▼2.3
Conservative	M. O'Gorman	338	20.1	▲4.4
Alliance	S. King	234	13.9	N/A
Majority		768	45.8	▼6.3
Turnout		1,678	41.5	▲4.6
Registered electors		4,043		
Labour hold		Swing		

=== Epping Hemnall ===
Epping Hemnall
Party	Candidate	Votes	%	±%
Conservative	M. Culling	798	45.1	▲1.5
Labour	I. Standfast	486	27.5	▲1.4
Alliance	J. Eves	485	27.4	▲9.3
Majority		312	17.6	▲0.1
Turnout		1,769	38.2	▼0.6
Registered electors		4,629		
Conservative hold		Swing		

=== Epping Lindsey ===
Epping Lindsey
Party	Candidate	Votes	%	±%
Conservative	J. O'Brien*	856	41.8	▼1.1
Alliance	D. Gent	629	30.7	▲2.1
Labour	D. Sturrock	562	27.5	▼2.6
Majority		227	11.1	▼3.3
Turnout		2,047	41.3	▲1.5
Registered electors		4,961		
Conservative hold		Swing		

=== Grange Hill ===
Grange Hill
Party	Candidate	Votes	%	±%
Alliance	G. Hallett	918	51.4	▼0.8
Conservative	M. Farnsworth	711	39.8	▼0.6
Labour	J. Faiz	158	8.8	▲1.4
Majority		207	11.6	▼0.2
Turnout		1,787	37.5	▲6.8
Registered electors		4,762		
Alliance gain from Conservative		Swing		

=== Loughton Broadway ===
Loughton Broadway
Party	Candidate	Votes	%	±%
Labour	S. Murray*	1,325	70.8	▲0.9
Conservative	D. Cheatle	264	14.1	▼1.7
Alliance	M. Barnett	212	11.3	▼3.9
National Front	B. Wilkins	71	3.8	N/A
Majority		1,061	56.7	▲3.5
Turnout		1,872	43.8	▲8.1
Registered electors		4,274		
Labour hold		Swing		

=== Loughton Forest ===
Loughton Forest
Party	Candidate	Votes	%	±%
Loughton Residents	R. Gow*	814	60.3	▲6.3
Conservative	E. Markham	436	32.3	▼5.3
Labour	H. McSweeney	100	7.4	▲2.9
Majority		378	28.0	▼11.6
Turnout		1,350	45.7	▼2.8
Registered electors		2,953		
Loughton Residents hold		Swing		

=== Loughton Roding ===
Loughton Roding
Party	Candidate	Votes	%	±%
Conservative	Ms A. Miller*	952	45.6	▲21.0
Labour	A. Peacham	707	33.9	▼8.3
Loughton Residents	A. Larner	259	12.4	▼12.1
Alliance	Ms J. Lowe	170	8.1	▼0.6
Majority		245	11.7	▲1.9
Turnout		2,088	48.9	▲6.0
Registered electors		4,267		
Conservative hold		Swing		

=== Loughton St. Johns ===
Loughton St. Johns
Party	Candidate	Votes	%	±%
Loughton Residents	Ms D. Rhodes*	1,058	54.5	▲13.2
Conservative	J. Phillips	654	33.7	▼12.0
Labour	Ms J. Ormston	231	11.9	▲2.9
Majority		404	20.8	▲10.8
Turnout		1,943	45.7	▼0.1
Registered electors		4,253		
Loughton Residents hold		Swing		

=== Loughton St. Mary’s ===
Loughton St. Mary’s
Party	Candidate	Votes	%	±%
Loughton Residents	S. Webb*	775	56.3	▼4.5
Conservative	D. James	417	30.3	▲4.0
Labour	Ms M. Guy	184	13.4	▲5.0
Majority		358	26.0	▼8.5
Turnout		1,376	41.6	▼0.8
Registered electors		3,308		
Loughton Residents hold		Swing		

=== Nazeing ===
Nazeing
Party	Candidate	Votes	%	±%
Conservative	M. Welch*	N/A	N/A	N/A
Majority		N/A	N/A	N/A
Turnout		N/A	N/A	N/A
Registered electors		3,683		
Conservative hold		Swing		

=== North Weald Bassett ===
North Weald Bassett
Party	Candidate	Votes	%	±%
Conservative	E. Hudspeth	N/A	N/A	N/A
Majority		N/A	N/A	N/A
Turnout		N/A	N/A	N/A
Registered electors		4,446		
Conservative hold		Swing		

=== Theydon Bois ===
Theydon Bois
Party	Candidate	Votes	%	±%
Conservative	J. Wainwright*	875	63.9	▼6.6
Alliance	D. Weldon	350	25.6	▲5.1
Labour	J. Davy	144	10.5	▲1.5
Majority		525	38.3	▼11.7
Turnout		1,369	41.3	▲7.3
Registered electors		3,315		
Conservative hold		Swing		

=== Waltham Abbey East ===
Waltham Abbey East
Party	Candidate	Votes	%	±%
Conservative	J. O'Reilly*	999	50.4	▼2.4
Labour	I. Bell	765	38.6	▼8.6
Alliance	M. Callaghan	220	11.1	N/A
Majority		234	11.8	▲6.2
Turnout		1,984	40.6	▲8.5
Registered electors		4,882		
Conservative hold		Swing		

=== Waltham Abbey Paternoster ===
Waltham Abbey Paternoster
Party	Candidate	Votes	%	±%
Labour	S. Riley*	824	65.5	▲6.6
Conservative	A. Brock	434	34.5	▼6.6
Majority		390	31.0	▲13.2
Turnout		1,258	35.6	▲1.8
Registered electors		3,537		
Labour hold		Swing		

=== Waltham Abbey West ===
Waltham Abbey West
Party	Candidate	Votes	%	±%
Conservative	G. Jailler*	753	53.4	▲4.2
Labour	F. Harewood	658	46.6	▲9.9
Majority		95	6.7	▼5.8
Turnout		1,411	37.9	▲2.5
Registered electors		3,724		
Conservative hold		Swing		
