= 1982 Epping Forest District Council election =

Local election in Epping Forest

← 1980	6 May 1982	1983 →

19 seats to Epping Forest District Council 1 by-election to Loughton Broadway 30 seats needed for a majority

	First party	Second party	Third party
Party	Conservative	Labour	Loughton Residents
Last election	45 seats, 51.8%	12 seats, 37.2%	N/A
Seats before	45	12	0
Seats after	42	12	3
Seat change	▼3	Steady	▲3
Popular vote	14,493	6,240	2,696
Percentage	47.5%	20.4%	8.8%
Swing	▼4.3%	▼16.8%	N/A
	Fourth party	Fifth party
Party	Alliance	Independent
Last election	0 seats, 6.7%	2 seats, 4.1%
Seats before	1	2
Seats after	0	2
Seat change	Steady	Steady
Popular vote	6,583	179
Percentage	21.6%	0.5%
Swing	▲14.9%	▼3.6%
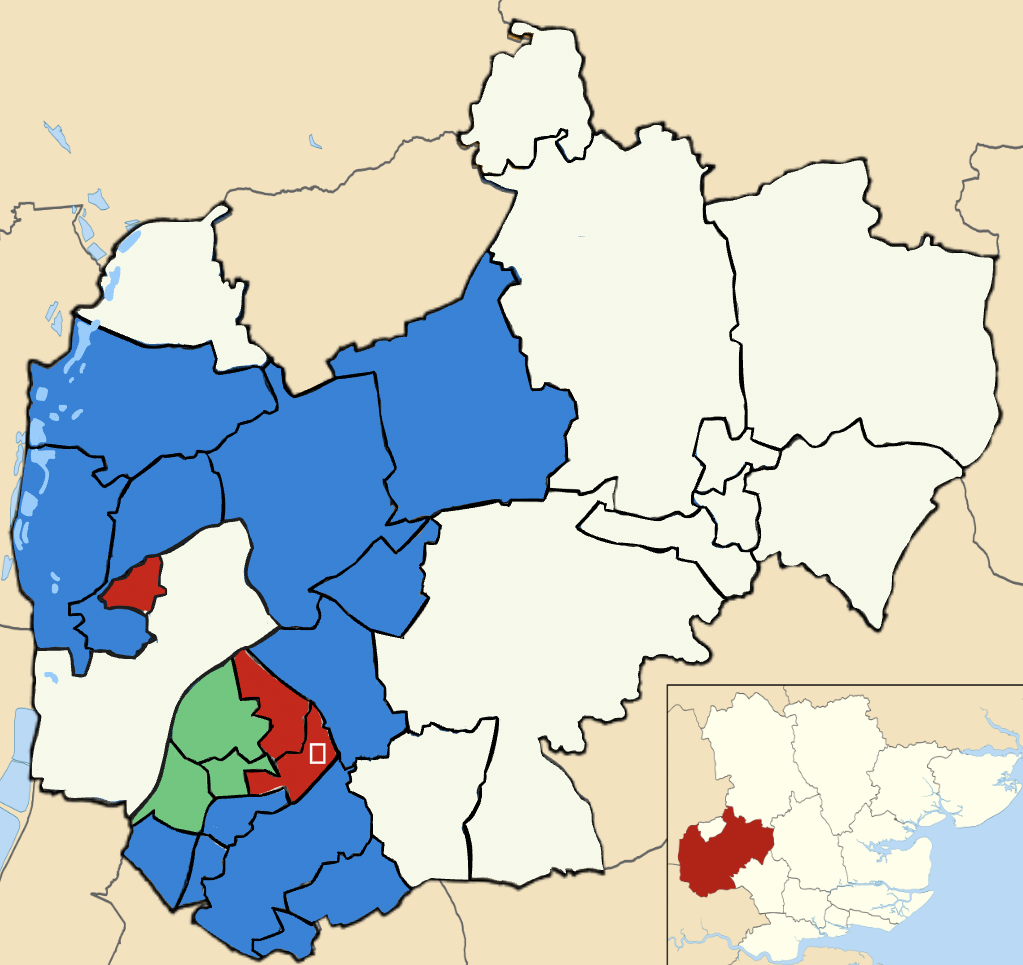
- Winner of each seat at the 1982 Epping Forest District Council election Rectangular inset (Loughton Broadway): By-election result
Leader before election
Conservative
Leader after election
Conservative

The 1982 Epping Forest District Council election took place on 6 May 1982 to elect members of Epping Forest District Council in Essex, England. 19 members of Epping Forest District Council in Essex were elected. The council remained under Conservative majority control.

== Background ==
The 1982 Epping Forest District Council election took place on 6 May 1982 to elect members of Epping Forest District Council in Essex, England. The election saw the emergence of the Loughton Residents Association (LRA), a new local political grouping formed in 1981 by residents of Loughton who sought greater consultation and openness in local government.

The LRA, originally called the Central Loughton Residents' Association, was established amid growing concerns that local government decisions were being taken without adequately involving the community. The group fielded candidates to represent Loughton residents more directly at all levels of local government.

The national political context in 1982 was turbulent. The Conservative government led by Margaret Thatcher faced widespread criticism for its handling of the economy, with unemployment reaching postwar highs. The year also saw the creation of the Social Democratic Party (SDP), following a split from Labour, which reshaped the political landscape nationally. Against this backdrop, the local elections provided an opportunity for residents’ groups and independents to gain ground.

In Epping Forest, the Conservatives retained control of the council but suffered losses in Loughton. The LRA made an immediate impact, winning three seats directly from the Conservatives. This breakthrough signalled the start of a long-standing role for the LRA in local politics, with the group becoming a major force in Loughton over the following decades.

Labour and the Liberals also contested seats but did not make the same level of progress locally as the LRA. Overall, the 1982 election marked a turning point in the district’s political history, introducing a durable residents’ movement that challenged the dominance of national parties in local affairs. Notably, the SDP-Liberal Alliance won more votes than Labour, whose vote share dropped sharply, particularly in its heartlands in Loughton, Debden, and Waltham Abbey. This marked the first time one of the two main parties had not placed second in terms of vote share.

== Results summary ==
1982 Epping Forest District Council election
Party	This election			Full council			This election		
Party	Seats	Net	Seats %	Other	Total	Total %	Votes	Votes %	+/−
Conservative	13	▼3	72.2	29	42	71.1	14,493	47.5	▼4.3
Labour	4	Steady	6.7	8	12	20.3	6,240	20.4	▼16.8
Loughton Residents	3	▲3	5.0	0	3	5.0	2,696	8.8	N/A
Independent	0	Steady	0.0	2	2	3.3	179	0.5	▼3.6
Liberal	0	Steady	0.0	0	0	0.0	6,583	21.6	▲14.9
Epping Residents	0	Steady	0.0	0	0	0.0	173	0.5	N/A
Ecology	0	Steady	0.0	0	0	0.0	103	0.3	N/A

== Ward results ==
=== Buckhurst Hill East ===
Buckhurst Hill East
Party	Candidate	Votes	%	±%
Conservative	G. Smith	904	49.8	▼2.1
Alliance	Ms F. Osborn	581	32.0	▲16.2
Labour	J. Markham	330	18.2	▼14.0
Majority		323	17.8	▼1.9
Turnout		1,815	46.3	▲16.0
Registered electors		3,918		
Conservative hold		Swing		

=== Buckhurst Hill West ===
Buckhurst Hill West
Party	Candidate	Votes	%	±%
Conservative	V. Milner*	1,299	65.1	▼2.4
Alliance	R. Eveling	522	26.2	▲5.0
Labour	Ms S. Staddon	174	8.7	▼2.6
Majority		777	38.9	▼7.3
Turnout		1,995	42.2	▼4.0
Registered electors		4,725		
Conservative hold		Swing		

=== Chigwell Row ===
Chigwell Row
Party	Candidate	Votes	%	±%
Conservative	R. McGregor*	456	62.4	▼9.0
Alliance	G. West	221	30.2	N/A
Labour	Ms A. Fowl	54	7.4	▼21.2
Majority		235	32.1	▼10.8
Turnout		731	41.3	▼32.8
Registered electors		1,768		
Conservative hold		Swing		

=== Chigwell Village ===
Chigwell Village
Party	Candidate	Votes	%	±%
Conservative	B. Gunby*	813	62.4	▼28.1
Alliance	A. Thompson	452	34.1	N/A
Labour	P. Speake	62	4.7	▼4.8
Majority		361	27.2	▼53.9
Turnout		1,327	40.9	▼8.0
Registered electors		3,812		
Conservative hold		Swing		

=== Debden Green ===
Debden Green
Party	Candidate	Votes	%	±%
Labour	P. Bostock*	644	46.0	▼29.8
Loughton Residents	M. Wardle	262	18.7	N/A
Conservative	Ms K. Bellamy	252	18.0	▼6.2
Alliance	L. Martin	241	17.2	N/A
Majority		382	27.3	▼24.4
Turnout		1,399	36.7	▲4.9
Registered electors		3,812		
Labour hold		Swing		

=== Epping Hemnall ===
Epping Hemnall
Party	Candidate	Votes	%	±%
Conservative	R. Hill*	889	48.3	▼1.0
Alliance	J. Eves	608	33.0	▲12.4
Labour	Ms M. Jackson	314	17.1	▼13.0
Ecology	R. Boenke	29	1.6	N/A
Majority		281	15.3	▼3.8
Turnout		1,840	40.4	▲2.9
Registered electors		4,559		
Conservative hold		Swing		

=== Epping Lindsey ===
Epping Lindsey
Party	Candidate	Votes	%	±%
Conservative	F. Limer*	989	44.2	▼4.7
Alliance	A. Payne	668	29.9	▲11.7
Labour	G. Scales	354	15.8	▼17.2
Epping Residents	Ms M. Jucker	173	7.7	N/A
Ecology	T. Broughton	52	2.3	N/A
Majority		321	14.4	▼1.5
Turnout		2,236	45.3	▲6.7
Registered electors		4,936		
Conservative hold		Swing		

=== Grange Hill ===
Grange Hill
Party	Candidate	Votes	%	±%
Conservative	A. Marshall	1,051	66.5	▼16.3
Alliance	J. Fuller	389	24.6	N/A
Labour	R. Opasiak	140	8.9	▼8.3
Majority		662	41.9	▼23.7
Turnout		1,580	35.5	▲12.5
Registered electors		4,451		
Conservative hold		Swing		

=== Loughton Broadway ===
Loughton Broadway
Party	Candidate	Votes	%	±%
Labour	Stephen Murray	799	44.4	▼40.7
Labour	H. Worby*	792		N/A
Alliance	M. Pettman*	673	37.4	N/A
Alliance	G. McNamara	651		N/A
Conservative	M. Kerwood	327	18.2	▲3.3
Conservative	Ms P. Torr	306		N/A
Majority		119	7.0	▼63.2
Turnout		1,799	39.7	▼6.6
Registered electors		4,527		
Labour hold		Swing		
Labour hold		Swing		

=== Loughton Forest ===
Loughton Forest
Party	Candidate	Votes	%	±%
Loughton Residents	R. Gow	819	54.9	N/A
Conservative	Ms A. Macdonald	502	33.6	▼41.8
Alliance	W. Randall	109	7.3	N/A
Labour	C. Martin	63	4.2	▲4.8
Majority		317	21.2	N/A
Turnout		1,493	50.8	▲15.9
Registered electors		2,940		
Loughton Residents gain from Conservative		Swing		

=== Loughton Roding ===
Loughton Roding
Party	Candidate	Votes	%	±%
Conservative	Ms A. Miller	862	43.3	▼0.9
Labour	C. Huckle	667	33.5	▼22.3
Alliance	A. Hilton	461	23.2	N/A
Majority		195	9.8	▲5.2
Turnout		1,990	45.4	▲5.5
Registered electors		4,387		
Conservative hold		Swing		

=== Loughton St. Johns ===
Loughton St. Johns
Party	Candidate	Votes	%	±%
Loughton Residents	Ms D. Rhodes	822	43.5	N/A
Conservative	J. Phillips	710	37.6	▼33.5
Alliance	P. Richardson	211	11.2	▲3.7
Labour	R. Cornell	145	7.7	▼13.7
Majority		112	5.9	N/A
Turnout		1,888	45.5	▼4.1
Registered electors		4,387		
Loughton Residents gain from Conservative		Swing		

=== Loughton St. Marys ===
Loughton Marys
Party	Candidate	Votes	%	±%
Loughton Residents	T. Webb	793	51.1	N/A
Conservative	A. Swallow*	442	28.5	▼40.3
Alliance	G. Hall	198	12.7	N/A
Labour	J. Davy	120	7.7	▼23.5
Majority		351	22.6	N/A
Turnout		1,553	47.6	▲16.5
Registered electors		3,266		
Loughton Residents gain from Conservative		Swing		

=== Nazeing ===
Nazeing
Party	Candidate	Votes	%	±%
Conservative	M. Welch*	997	74.6	▼25.4
Labour	K. Morris	339	25.4	N/A
Majority		658	49.3	▼50.7
Turnout		1,336	35.7	N/A
Registered electors		3,745		
Conservative hold		Swing		

=== North Weald Bassett ===
North Weald Bassett
Party	Candidate	Votes	%	±%
Conservative	B. Greenhill*	1,001	60.2	▼4.7
Labour	P. Vickery	482	29.0	▼6.1
Independent	R. Wyness	179	10.8	N/A
Majority		519	31.2	▲0.4
Turnout		1,662	41.5	▼31.2
Registered electors		4,004		
Conservative hold		Swing		

=== Theydon Bois ===
Theydon Bois
Party	Candidate	Votes	%	±%
Conservative	Ms J. Wainwright*	969	73.0	▼27.0
Alliance	O. Dunseath	250	18.8	N/A
Labour	Ms F. Davy	86	6.5	N/A
Ecology	Ms L. Boenke	22	1.7	N/A
Majority		719	54.2	▼45.8
Turnout		1,327	40.6	N/A
Registered electors		3,268		
Conservative hold		Swing		

=== Waltham Abbey East ===
Waltham Abbey East
Party	Candidate	Votes	%	±%
Conservative	J. O'Reilly	1,074	57.7	▲9.4
Labour	J. Popely	488	26.2	▼25.5
Alliance	Ms G. Pettman	299	16.1	N/A
Majority		586	31.5	▲28.0
Turnout		1,861	39.4	▼1.8
Registered electors		4,721		
Conservative hold		Swing		

=== Waltham Abbey Paternoster ===
Waltham Abbey Paternoster
Party	Candidate	Votes	%	±%
Labour	S. Riley*	608	45.3	▼27.5
Conservative	J. Macdougall	416	31.0	▲3.8
Alliance	J. Stewart	317	23.6	N/A
Majority		192	14.3	▼31.3
Turnout		1,341	37.0	▼0.6
Registered electors		3,620		
Labour hold		Swing		

=== Waltham Abbey West ===
Waltham Abbey West
Party	Candidate	Votes	%	±%
Conservative	G. Jailler*	540	41.7	▼9.4
Alliance	Ms M. Lermit	383	29.6	N/A
Labour	D. Grenville-Brown	371	28.7	▼20.2
Majority		157	12.1	▲9.9
Turnout		1,294	34.8	▼39.6
Registered electors		3,720		
Conservative hold		Swing		
