= 1983 Epping Forest District Council election =

1983 English local election

← 1982	5 May 1983	1984 →

20 seats to Epping Forest District Council 30 seats needed for a majority

	First party	Second party	Third party
Party	Conservative	Labour	Loughton Residents
Last election	42 seats, 47.5%	12 seats, 20.4%	3 seats, 8.8%
Seats before	42	12	3
Seats after	39	13	4
Seat change	▼3	▲1	▲1
Popular vote	13,119	7,641	1,482
Percentage	46.6%	27.1%	5.2%
Swing	▼0.9%	▲6.4%	▼3.6%
	Fourth party	Fifth party	Sixth party
Party	Independent	Ind. Conservative	Alliance
Last election	2 seats, 0.5%	0 seats, N/A	0 seats, 21.6%
Seats before	2	0	0
Seats after	2	1	0
Seat change	Steady	▲1	Steady
Popular vote	382	768	4,602
Percentage	1.3%	2.7%	16.3%
Swing	▲0.8%	N/A	▼5.3%
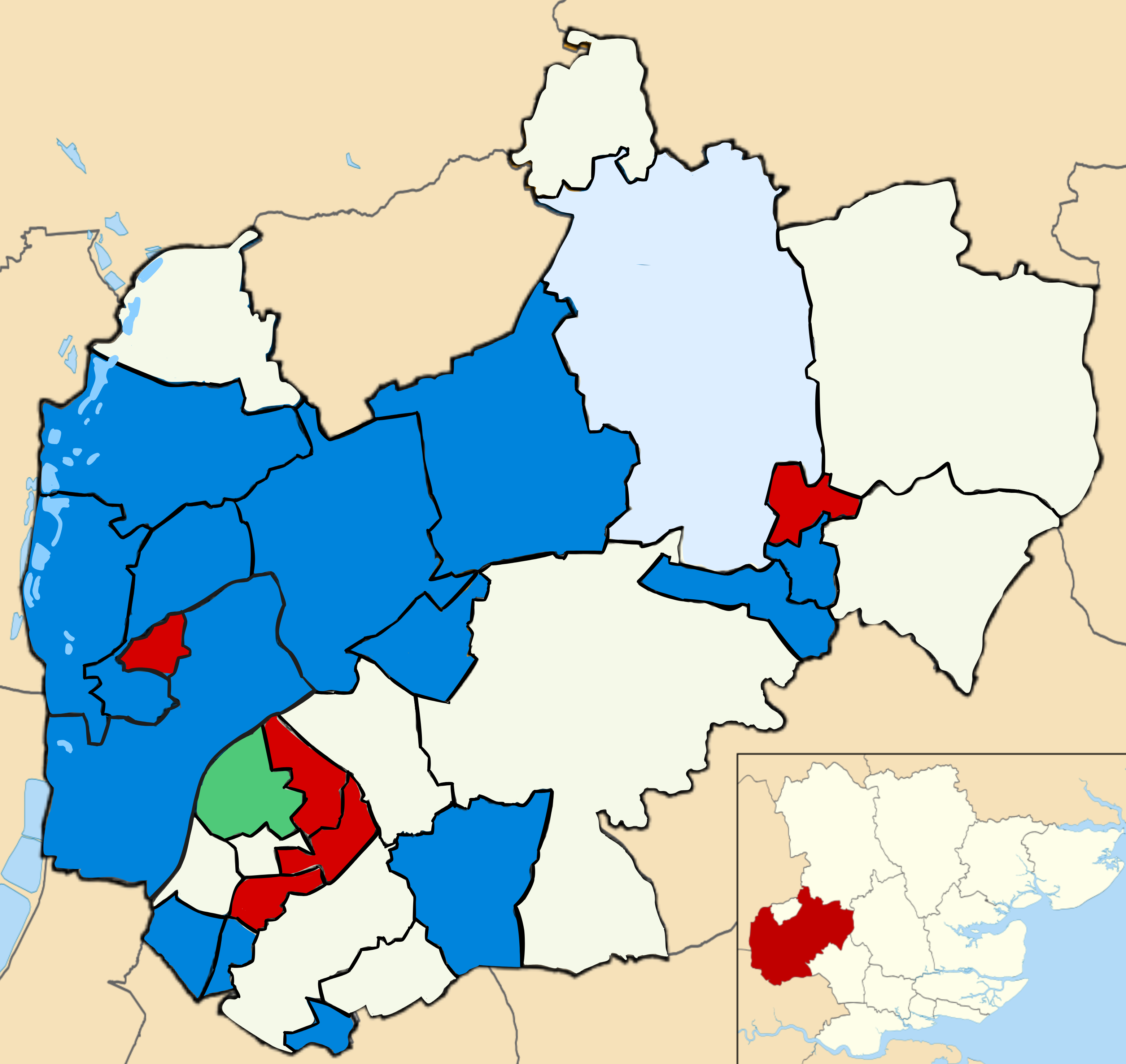
- Winner of each seat at the 1983 Epping Forest District Council election
Leader before election
Conservative
Leader after election
Conservative

The 1983 Epping Forest District Council election took place on 5 May 1983 to elect members of Epping Forest District Council in Essex, England. 20 members of Epping Forest District Council in Essex were elected. The council remained under Conservative majority control.

== Background ==
The 1983 Epping Forest District Council election was held on 5 May 1983 to elect members of Epping Forest District Council in Essex, England. The election occurred amid significant political and social developments nationally, including rising unemployment, the continued prominence of the Conservative government led by Margaret Thatcher, and the rise of the Liberal-SDP Alliance, which had formed in 1981 following the split of several moderate Labour MPs. The election was also notable locally for the continued growth of the Loughton Residents Association (LRA), a local political group formed in 1981 to advocate for greater transparency and resident involvement in council decision-making.

The Conservatives retained control of Epping Forest District Council but faced challenges on multiple fronts. In Loughton, the LRA continued to gain seats from the Conservatives, winning an additional seat in Loughton St. Johns, demonstrating the growing influence of residents’ groups in the district. Labour remained a smaller but established presence, while the Liberal-SDP Alliance made significant inroads, coming closest to winning their first council seat in Chipping Ongar, where they finished just 34 votes behind the Conservative candidate.

Another highlight of the election was the election of Richard Morgan in Moreton and Matching, beginning a 40-year tenure on the council that would last until 2027. Morgan’s victory marked the start of one of the longest continuous periods of service by a single councillor in Epping Forest’s history, the other being Cllr Stephen Murray (elected in 1982)

Nationally, the election took place during a period of political tension and social change. The United Kingdom was experiencing record unemployment, the introduction of new economic measures by the Thatcher government, and debates over the one-pound coin and other fiscal policies.

== Results summary ==
1983 Epping Forest District Council election
Party	This election			Full council			This election		
Party	Seats	Net	Seats %	Other	Total	Total %	Votes	Votes %	+/−
Conservative	13	▼3	72.2	26	39	66.1	13,119	46.6	▼0.9
Labour	4	▲1	6.7	9	13	22.0	7,641	27.1	▼6.4
Loughton Residents	1	▲1	1.6	3	4	6.7	1,482	5.2	▼3.6
Independent	0	Steady	0.0	2	2	3.3	382	1.3	▲0.8
Ind. Conservative	1	▲1	1.6	1	1	1.6	768	2.7	N/A
Liberal	0	Steady	0.0	0	0	0.0	4,602	16.3	▼5.3
Ecology	0	Steady	0.0	0	0	0.0	104	0.4	▲0.1

== Ward results ==
=== Buckhurst Hill East ===
Buckhurst Hill East
Party	Candidate	Votes	%	±%
Conservative	C. Perry*	752	52.4	▲2.6
Labour	L. Baddock	351	24.4	▲6.2
Alliance	A. Hall	333	23.2	▼8.8
Majority		401	27.9	▲10.1
Turnout		1,436	37.3	▼9.0
Registered electors		3,853		
Conservative hold		Swing		

=== Buckhurst Hill West ===
Buckhurst Hill West
Party	Candidate	Votes	%	±%
Conservative	I. Beattie*	1,264	70.3	▲5.2
Alliance	R. Eveling	355	19.7	▼6.5
Labour	T. Green	179	10.0	▲1.3
Majority		909	50.6	▲11.7
Turnout		1,798	38.6	▼0.3
Registered electors		4,658		
Conservative hold		Swing		

=== Chipping Ongar ===
Chipping Ongar
Party	Candidate	Votes	%	±%
Conservative	F. Love*	366	52.4	▼16.1
Alliance	D. James	332	47.6	N/A
Majority		34	4.9	▼32.2
Turnout		698	55.0	▲17.9
Registered electors		1,270		
Conservative hold		Swing		

=== Debden Green ===
Debden Green
Party	Candidate	Votes	%	±%
Labour	R. Cornell	891	65.9	▲19.9
Conservative	J. Phillips	267	19.7	▲1.7
Alliance	R. Millett	194	14.3	▼2.9
Majority		624	46.2	▲18.9
Turnout		1,352	35.9	▼0.8
Registered electors		3,762		
Labour hold		Swing		

=== Epping Hemnall ===
Epping Hemnall
Party	Candidate	Votes	%	±%
Conservative	B. Carpenter	1,049	53.8	▲5.5
Alliance	J. Eves	458	23.5	▼9.5
Labour	P. Speake	390	20.0	▲2.9
Ecology	R. Boenke	52	2.7	▲1.1
Majority		591	30.3	▲15.0
Turnout		1,949	43.1	▲2.7
Registered electors		4,522		
Conservative hold		Swing		

=== Epping Lindsey ===
Epping Lindsey
Party	Candidate	Votes	%	±%
Conservative	A. O'Brien*	1,080	48.9	▲4.7
Alliance	A. Payne	625	28.3	▼1.6
Labour	F. Davy	431	19.5	▲3.7
Ecology	T. Broughton	72	3.3	▲1.0
Majority		455	20.6	▲6.2
Turnout		2,208	45.2	▼0.1
Registered electors		4,880		
Conservative hold		Swing		

=== Grange Hill ===
Grange Hill
Party	Candidate	Votes	%	±%
Conservative	A. Bryant*	1,019	62.2	▼4.3
Alliance	A. Thompson	474	29.0	▲4.4
Labour	I. Prince	144	8.8	▼0.1
Majority		545	33.3	▼8.6
Turnout		1,637	36.7	▲1.2
Registered electors		4,456		
Conservative hold		Swing		

=== Greensted & Marden Ash ===
Greensted & Marden Ash
Party	Candidate	Votes	%	±%
Conservative	C. Maclennan	503	56.5	▼10.4
Labour	F. Barnes	195	21.9	▼11.2
Alliance	L. Searl	192	21.6	N/A
Majority		308	34.6	▲0.7
Turnout		890	49.0	▼30.6
Registered electors		1,815		
Conservative hold		Swing		

=== High Beech ===
High Beech
Party	Candidate	Votes	%	±%
Conservative	H. Taylor*	419	54.6	Steady
Alliance	F. Little	176	22.9	N/A
Ind. Conservative	R. Knibb	172	22.4	▼2.9
Majority		243	31.7	▲2.3
Turnout		767	35.2	▼37.6
Registered electors		2,181		
Conservative hold		Swing		

=== Lambourne ===
Lambourne
Party	Candidate	Votes	%	±%
Conservative	R. Amanet*	541	57.6	▲2.8
Labour	C. Huckle	398	42.4	▼2.8
Majority		143	15.2	▲5.6
Turnout		939	64.8	▼8.6
Registered electors		1,450		
Conservative hold		Swing		

=== Loughton Broadway ===
Loughton Broadway
Party	Candidate	Votes	%	±%
Labour	J. Davis*	1,019	57.6	▲13.2
Alliance	M. Pettman	404	22.8	▼14.6
Conservative	I. Holman	346	19.6	▲1.2
Majority		615	34.8	▲4.9
Turnout		1,769	40.4	▲0.7
Registered electors		4,380		
Labour hold		Swing		

=== Loughton Roding ===
Loughton Roding
Party	Candidate	Votes	%	±%
Labour	M. Newman	652	32.3	▼1.2
Conservative	T. Swallow	591	29.2	▼14.1
Loughton Residents	C. Johnson	536	26.5	N/A
Alliance	J. Lowe	242	12.0	▲11.2
Majority		61	3.0	▼6.8
Turnout		2,021	49.8	▲4.4
Registered electors		4,056		
Labour gain from Conservative		Swing		

=== Loughton St. Johns ===
Loughton St. Johns
Party	Candidate	Votes	%	±%
Loughton Residents	R. Curtis	946	49.6	▲6.1
Conservative	R. Brady*	755	39.6	▲2.0
Labour	J. Markham	155	8.1	▲1.4
Alliance	P. Richardson	50	2.6	▼8.6
Majority		191	10.0	N/A
Turnout		1,906	45.8	▲0.3
Registered electors		4,161		
Loughton Residents gain from Conservative		Swing		

=== Moreton & Matching ===
Moreton & Matching
Party	Candidate	Votes	%	±%
Ind. Conservative	Richard Morgan	596	73.9	N/A
Alliance	J. Carter	211	26.1	N/A
Majority		385	47.7	N/A
Turnout		807	86.7	N/A
Registered electors		931		
Ind. Conservative gain from Conservative		Swing		

=== Nazeing ===
Nazeing
Party	Candidate	Votes	%	±%
Conservative	E. Downes	1,012	70.2	▼4.4
Labour	I. Brent	430	29.8	▲4.4
Majority		582	40.4	▼8.8
Turnout		1,442	39.1	▲3.4
Registered electors		3,689		
Conservative hold		Swing		

=== North Weald Bassett ===
North Weald Bassett
Party	Candidate	Votes	%	±%
Conservative	I. Abbey*	988	58.2	▼2.0
Independent	R. Wyness	382	22.5	▲11.7
Labour	D. Grenville-Brown	328	19.3	▼9.7
Majority		606	35.7	▲4.5
Turnout		1,698	41.9	▲0.4
Registered electors		4,055		
Conservative hold		Swing		

=== Shelley ===
Shelley
Party	Candidate	Votes	%	±%
Labour	R. Barnes*	562	78.3	▲17.3
Conservative	M. Docherty	156	21.7	▼17.3
Majority		406	56.5	▲34.6
Turnout		718	51.5	▼25.7
Registered electors		1,393		
Labour hold		Swing		

=== Waltham Abbey East ===
Waltham Abbey East
Party	Candidate	Votes	%	±%
Conservative	D. Esau*	864	57.4	▼0.3
Labour	F. Harewood	379	25.2	▼1.0
Alliance	G. Pettman	261	17.4	▲1.3
Majority		485	32.2	▲0.7
Turnout		1,504	32.0	▼7.4
Registered electors		4,693		
Conservative hold		Swing		

=== Waltham Abbey Paternoster ===
Waltham Abbey Paternoster
Party	Candidate	Votes	%	±%
Labour	C. Hewins*	763	55.4	▲10.1
Conservative	K. Bellamy	503	36.5	▲5.5
Alliance	J. Fuller	111	8.1	▼15.5
Majority		260	18.9	▲4.6
Turnout		1,377	38.4	▲1.4
Registered electors		3,588		
Labour hold		Swing		

=== Waltham Abbey West ===
Waltham Abbey West
Party	Candidate	Votes	%	±%
Conservative	H. Smith*	644	49.2	▲7.5
Labour	D. Murray	481	36.7	▲8.0
Alliance	J. Jenkinson	184	14.1	▼15.5
Majority		163	12.5	▲0.4
Turnout		1,309	35.4	▲0.6
Registered electors		3,694		
Conservative hold		Swing		
