= 1980 Epping Forest District Council election =

1980 UK local government election

← 1979	1 May 1980	1982 →

20 seats to Epping Forest District Council 30 seats needed for a majority

	First party	Second party
Party	Conservative	Labour
Last election	47 seats, 54.5%	10 seat, 36.3%
Seats before	47	10
Seats after	45	12
Seat change	▼2	▲2
Popular vote	11,463	8,234
Percentage	51.8%	37.2%
Swing	▼2.7%	▲0.9%
	Third party	Fourth party
Party	Liberal	Independent
Last election	0 seats, 7.0%	2 seats, 1.3%
Seats before	0	2
Seats after	0	2
Seat change	Steady	Steady
Popular vote	1,492	922
Percentage	6.7%	4.1%
Swing	▼0.3%	▲2.8%
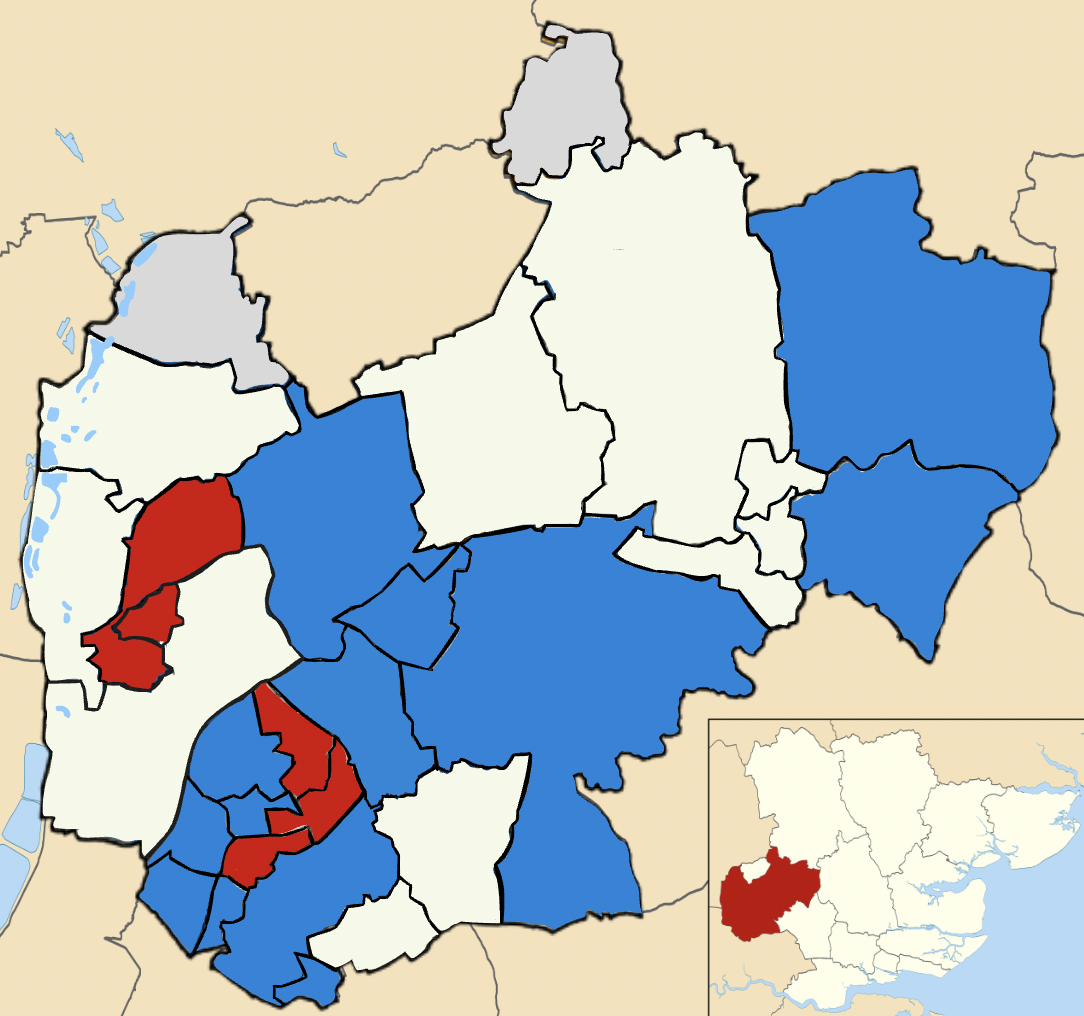
- Winner of each seat at the 1980 Epping Forest District Council election
Leader before election
Conservative
Leader after election
Conservative

The 1980 Epping Forest District Council election took place on 1 May 1980 to elect members of Epping Forest District Council in Essex, England. 20 members of Epping Forest District Council in Essex were elected. The council remained under Conservative majority control.

== Background ==
The 1980 Epping Forest District Council election took place on 1 May 1980 to elect members of Epping Forest District Council in Essex, England. A total of 18 of the 58 seats were contested, representing roughly one-third of the council. The election occurred against the backdrop of national political and economic challenges, with the Conservative Party retaining control of the council, though losing two seats to Labour in Loughton Roding and Waltham Abbey East.

The election took place during a period of industrial unrest and economic difficulty in the United Kingdom. Earlier in the year, workers at the British Steel Corporation staged a nationwide strike over pay, the first major steel strike since 1926, affecting some 90,000 employees. By March, an Evening Standard opinion poll indicated growing public dissatisfaction with the Conservative government led by Margaret Thatcher, who had become Prime Minister following the 1979 general election. Rising unemployment and austerity measures, including halved benefits to striking workers announced in February, were major national concerns influencing local voting behaviour.

The Conservatives maintained a majority on the council despite minor losses, and voter turnout was far lower than in the previous 1979 election. The election results illustrated the continuing strength of the Conservative Party in Epping Forest, while also highlighting Labour’s ability to regain ground in selected wards.

== Results summary ==
1980 Epping Forest District Council election
Party	This election			Full council			This election		
Party	Seats	Net	Seats %	Other	Total	Total %	Votes	Votes %	+/−
Conservative	13	▼2	72.2	32	45	76.2	11,463	51.8	▼2.7
Labour	5	▲2	27.7	7	12	20.3	8,234	37.2	▲0.9
Independent	2	Steady	3.3	0	2	3.3	922	4.1	▲2.8
Liberal	0	Steady	0.0	0	0	0.0	1,492	6.7	▼0.3

== Ward results ==
=== Buckhurst Hill East ===
Buckhurst Hill East
Party	Candidate	Votes	%	±%
Conservative	R. Braybrook	614	51.9	▲3.7
Labour	B. Mooney	381	32.2	▲2.9
Liberal	G. Chapman	187	15.8	▼6.7
Majority		233	19.7	▲0.8
Turnout		1,182	30.3	▼45.7
Registered electors		3,907		
Conservative hold		Swing		

=== Buckhurst Hill West ===
Buckhurst Hill West
Party	Candidate	Votes	%	±%
Conservative	L. Welch*	1,097	67.5	Steady
Liberal	R. Eveling	345	21.2	▼0.2
Labour	L. Timson	184	11.3	▲0.3
Majority		752	46.2	▲0.3
Turnout		1,626	33.7	▼44.3
Registered electors		4,832		
Conservative hold		Swing		

=== Chigwell Village ===
Chigwell Village
Party	Candidate	Votes	%	±%
Conservative	N. Risdon*	784	90.5	▼9.5
Labour	M. Cornell	82	9.5	N/A
Majority		702	81.1	▼18.9
Turnout		866	48.9	N/A
Registered electors		1,772		
Conservative hold		Swing		

=== Debden Green ===
Debden Green
Party	Candidate	Votes	%	±%
Labour	B. Whitlock*	945	75.8	▲13.5
Conservative	A. Mitchell	301	24.2	▼13.5
Majority		644	51.7	▲27.1
Turnout		1,246	31.8	▼33.3
Registered electors		3,924		
Labour hold		Swing		

=== Epping Hemnall ===
Epping Hemnall
Party	Candidate	Votes	%	±%
Conservative	M. Aldworth*	829	49.3	▼50.7
Labour	Ms M. Jackson	507	30.1	N/A
Liberal	J. Eves	347	20.6	N/A
Majority		322	19.1	▼80.9
Turnout		1,683	37.5	N/A
Registered electors		4,489		
Conservative hold		Swing		

=== Epping Lindsey ===
Epping Lindsey
Party	Candidate	Votes	%	±%
Conservative	R. Pocock	955	48.9	▼51.1
Labour	L. Scales	644	33.0	N/A
Liberal	O. Dunseath	355	18.2	N/A
Majority		311	15.9	▼84.1
Turnout		1,954	38.6	N/A
Registered electors		5,058		
Conservative hold		Swing		

=== Grange Hill ===
Grange Hill
Party	Candidate	Votes	%	±%
Conservative	Ms M. Farnsworth*	794	82.8	▼17.2
Labour	R. Cornell	165	17.2	N/A
Majority		629	65.6	▼24.4
Turnout		959	23.0	N/A
Registered electors		4,167		
Conservative hold		Swing		

=== High Ongar ===
High Ongar
Party	Candidate	Votes	%	±%
Conservative	D. Morton*	328	62.6	▼7.2
Labour	J. Stephenson	196	37.4	▲7.2
Majority		132	25.2	▼14.5
Turnout		524	56.6	▼23.6
Registered electors		925		
Conservative hold		Swing		

=== Loughton Broadway ===
Loughton Broadway
Party	Candidate	Votes	%	±%
Labour	M. Pettman*	1,286	85.1	▲24.5
Conservative	F. Fernandez	225	14.9	▼24.5
Majority		1,061	70.2	▲48.9
Turnout		1,511	33.1	▼36.4
Registered electors		4,568		
Labour hold		Swing		

=== Loughton Forest ===
Loughton Forest
Party	Candidate	Votes	%	±%
Conservative	D. James*	776	75.4	▲10.0
Liberal	L. Baddock	160	15.5	▼6.5
Labour	G. Mathieson	93	9.0	▼3.6
Majority		616	59.9	▲16.5
Turnout		1,029	34.9	▼43.7
Registered electors		2,950		
Conservative hold		Swing		

=== Loughton Roding ===
Loughton Roding
Party	Candidate	Votes	%	±%
Labour	R. Baddock	998	55.8	▲8.1
Conservative	G. Beldom*	790	44.2	▼8.1
Majority		208	11.6	N/A
Turnout		1,788	39.9	▼28.4
Registered electors		4,484		
Labour gain from Conservative		Swing		

=== Loughton St. Johns ===
Loughton St. Johns
Party	Candidate	Votes	%	±%
Conservative	Ms J. Steele	931	71.1	▲8.9
Labour	Ms G. Pettman	280	21.4	▲3.1
Liberal	W. Randall	98	7.5	▼12.0
Majority		651	49.6	▲6.9
Turnout		1,309	30.8	▼49.5
Registered electors		4,250		
Conservative hold		Swing		

=== Loughton St. Marys ===
Loughton St. Marys
Party	Candidate	Votes	%	±%
Conservative	Ms L. Scott	700	68.8	▲8.5
Labour	P. Kelly	280	31.2	▲10.5
Majority		220	37.7	▼1.8
Turnout		980	31.1	▼47.8
Registered electors		3,265		
Conservative hold		Swing		

=== Passingford ===
Passingford
Party	Candidate	Votes	%	±%
Conservative	J. Pledge	404	75.0	▼25.0
Labour	C. Huckle	135	25.0	N/A
Majority		269	50.0	▼50.0
Turnout		539	35.3	N/A
Registered electors		1,529		
Conservative hold		Swing		

=== Roothing Country ===
Roothing Country
Party	Candidate	Votes	%	±%
Conservative	E. Pye	483	88.5	▼11.5
Labour	M. Hayton	63	11.5	N/A
Majority		420	76.9	▼23.1
Turnout		546	44.4	N/A
Registered electors		1,229		
Conservative hold		Swing		

=== Roydon ===
Roydon
Party	Candidate	Votes	%	±%
Independent	A. Vare*	576	80.9	▼19.1
Labour	D. Sherman	136	19.1	N/A
Majority		440	61.8	▼38.2
Turnout		712	36.7	N/A
Registered electors		1,529		
Independent hold		Swing		

=== Sheering ===
Sheering
Party	Candidate	Votes	%	±%
Independent	W. Brown	346	59.9	N/A
Conservative	R. Knibb	232	40.1	N/A
Majority		114	19.7	N/A
Turnout		578	39.0	▼41.3
Registered electors		1,482		
Independent gain from Independent		Swing		

=== Theydon Bois ===
Theydon Bois
Party	Candidate	Votes	%	±%
Conservative	W. Axon	N/A	N/A	N/A
Majority		N/A	N/A	N/A
Turnout		N/A	N/A	N/A
Registered electors		3,308		
Conservative hold		Swing		

=== Waltham Abbey East ===
Waltham Abbey East
Party	Candidate	Votes	%	±%
Labour	J. Hewick	939	51.7	▲2.0
Conservative	J. O'Reilly*	876	48.3	▼2.0
Majority		63	3.5	N/A
Turnout		1,815	37.6	▼31.5
Registered electors		4,830		
Labour gain from Conservative		Swing		

=== Waltham Abbey Paternoster ===
Waltham Abbey Paternoster
Party	Candidate	Votes	%	±%
Labour	J. Hewins	920	72.8	▲15.1
Conservative	A. Laws	344	27.2	▼15.1
Majority		576	45.6	▲30.3
Turnout		1,264	35.8	▼34.7
Registered electors		3,529		
Labour hold		Swing		
