= 1991 Epping Forest District Council election =

1991 UK local government election

← 1990	2 May 1991	1992 →

20 out of 59 seats to Epping Forest District Council 30 seats needed for a majority

	First party	Second party	Third party
Party	Conservative	Labour	Loughton Residents
Last election	36 seats, 39.7%	13 seats, 31.4%	7 seats, 8.9%
Seats before	33	13	7
Seats after	30	14	7
Seat change	▼6	▲1	Steady
Popular vote	10,500	8,722	1,509
Percentage	36.9%	30.6%	5.3%
Swing	▼2.5%	▼0.8%	▼1.3%
	Fourth party	Fifth party	Sixth party
Party	Liberal Democrats	SDP	Epping Residents
Last election	0 seat, 11.9%	1 seat, 3.5% (as the old SDP)	N/A
Seats before	0	1	2 (Note: Two Epping councillors, Jones and A. O'Brien resigned the whip earlier that year.)
Seats after	2	2	1
Seat change	▲2	▲1	▲1
Popular vote	4,508	1,340	1,163
Percentage	15.8%	4.7%	4.0%
Swing	▲3.9%	▲1.2%	N/A
	Seventh party	Eighth party
Party	Independent	Ind. Conservative
Last election	N/A	N/A
Seats before	2 (Note: Nazeing Councillor Downes resigned from the party earlier that year to sit as an Independent alongside Roydon Councillor Easton.)	1
Seats after	2	1
Seat change	▲1	Steady
Popular vote	1,119	N/A
Percentage	3.9%	N/A
Swing	N/A	N/A
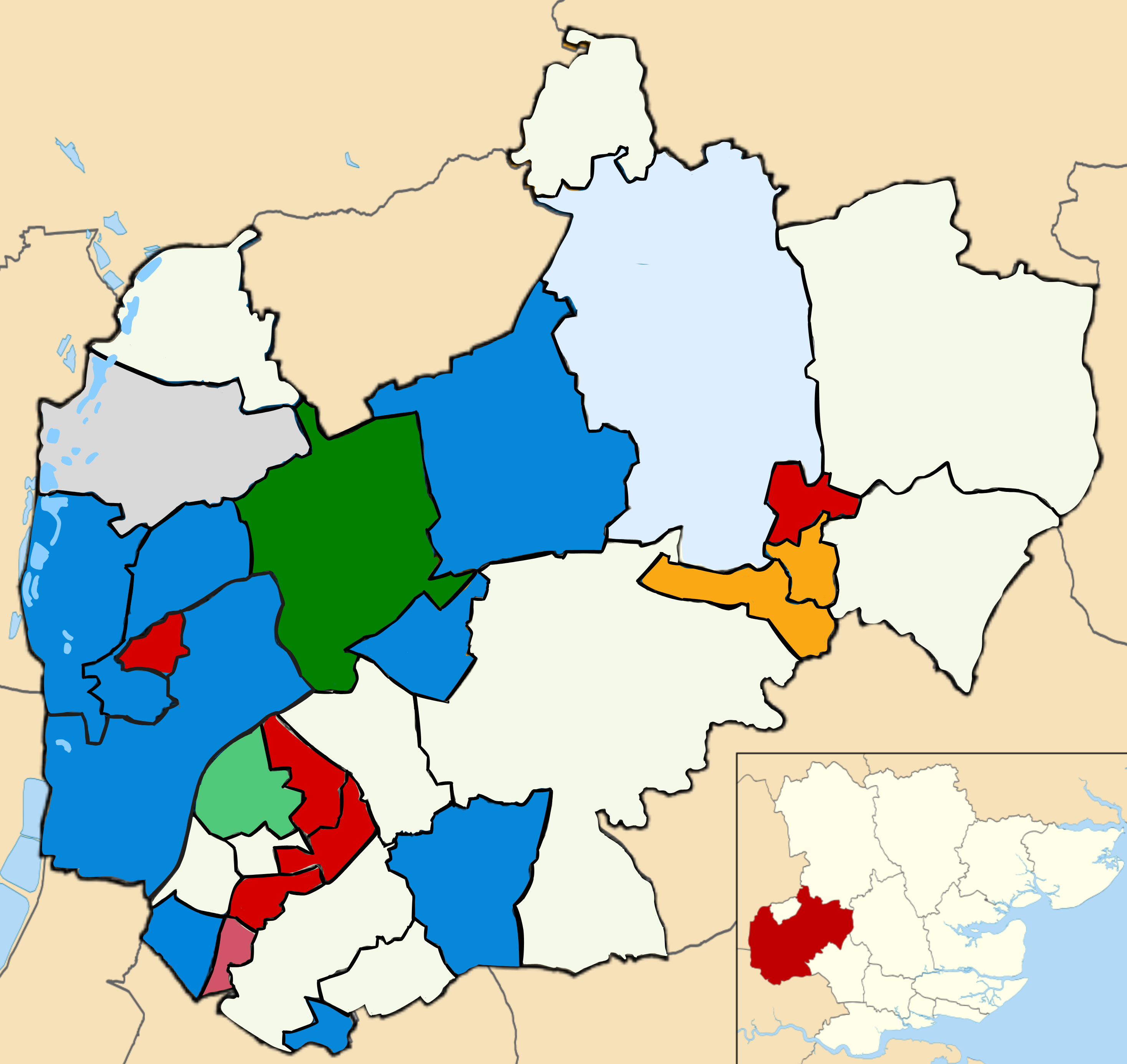
- Winner of each seat at the 1991 Epping Forest District Council election
Leader before election
Conservative
Leader after election
Conservative

The 1991 Epping Forest District Council election took place on 2 May 1991 to elect members of Epping Forest District Council in Essex, England. 20 members of Epping Forest District Council in Essex were elected. The council remained under Conservative majority control.

== Background ==
The 1991 Epping Forest District Council election took place during a period of ongoing economic difficulty and political transition in the United Kingdom. The country remained in recession, with unemployment reaching 2,175,000 by May, the highest level since late 1988, and exceeding the European average for the first time since 1987. Many voters were concerned about job security, particularly in manufacturing and financial services, as redundancies continued to rise.

Nationally, the Conservative government, now led by Prime Minister John Major, was managing the unpopular legacy of the Community Charge, or "poll tax," which had sparked protests, non-payment campaigns, and riots in the previous year. The government had announced plans to replace it with the Council Tax in 1993, an effort to mitigate public dissatisfaction while maintaining local government finance. Opinion polls in the months leading up to the election showed Labour gaining ground, with one MORI poll in May placing Labour six points ahead of the Conservatives. The Liberal Democrats were also consolidating support, having trebled their national vote share in the fifteen months prior.

Local political issues also reflected these national trends. Voters in Epping Forest were presented with competitive contests across multiple wards, with seats contested by Conservatives, Labour, Liberal Democrats, the remnants of the Social Democrats, and local Residents or Ratepayers groups.

== Summary ==
1991 Epping Forest District Council election
Party	This election			Full council			This election		
Party	Seats	Net	Seats %	Other	Total	Total %	Votes	Votes %	+/−
Conservative	8	▼6	40.0	22	30	50.8	10,500	36.9	▼2.5
Labour	5	▲1	25.0	8	13	22.0	8,722	30.6	▼0.8
Loughton Residents	1	Steady	5.0	6	7	11.8	1,509	5.3	▼1.3
Liberal Democrats	2	▲2	10.0		3	5.0	4,508	15.8	▲3.9
SDP	1	▲1	5.0	1	2	3.3	1,340	4.7	▲1.2
Epping Residents	1	▲1	0	0	0	0.0	1,163	4.0	N/A
Independent	1	▲1	5.0	1	2	1.6	1,119	3.9	N/A
Ind. Conservative	1	Steady	5.0	0	1	1.6	N/A	N/A	N/A

== Results ==
=== Buckhurst Hill East ===
Buckhurst Hill East
Party	Candidate	Votes	%	±%
SDP	G. Dunseath	802	43.0	▼1.2
Conservative	M. Bell*	496	26.6	▲2.1
Liberal Democrats	P. Spencer	368	19.7	▲2.7
Labour	Ms L. Baddock	201	10.8	▼3.6
Majority		306	16.4	▼3.3
Turnout		1,867	47.3	▼10.7
Registered electors		3,947		
SDP gain from Conservative		Swing		

=== Buckhurst Hill West ===
Buckhurst Hill West
Party	Candidate	Votes	%	±%
Conservative	I. Beattie*	940	48.4	▼10.4
SDP	P. Mason	538	27.7	N/A
Liberal Democrats	D. Jenkinson	337	17.3	▼10.2
Labour	B. Mooney	129	6.6	▼7.1
Majority		402	20.7	▼10.6
Turnout		1,944	40.4	▼6.8
Registered electors		4,812		
Conservative hold		Swing		

=== Chipping Ongar ===
Chipping Ongar
Party	Candidate	Votes	%	±%
Liberal Democrats	K. Wright	409	52.9	▲11.8
Conservative	F. Love*	280	36.2	▼13.7
Labour	R. Gross	84	10.9	▲1.8
Majority		129	16.7	▲5.0
Turnout		773	58.1	▼1.7
Registered electors		1,330		
Liberal Democrats gain from Conservative		Swing		

=== Debden Green ===
Debden Green
Party	Candidate	Votes	%	±%
Labour	Ms C. Baggarley	924	66.8	▼4.4
Conservative	L. Daniel	309	22.3	▼1.3
Liberal Democrats	D. Weldon	151	10.9	N/A
Majority		615	44.4	▼3.2
Turnout		1,384	35.5	▼10.6
Registered electors		3,899		
Labour hold		Swing		

=== Epping Hemnall ===
Epping Hemnall
Party	Candidate	Votes	%	±%
Conservative	Ms D. Collins	890	42.8	▲0.2
Epping Residents	Ms J. Jones*	412	19.8	N/A
Liberal Democrats	Ms S. Mann	403	19.4	▼8.4
Labour	B. Green	375	18.0	▼8.4
Majority		478	23.0	▼8.2
Turnout		2,080	45.8	▼1.9
Registered electors		4,541		
Conservative hold		Swing		

=== Epping Lindsey ===
Epping Lindsey
Party	Candidate	Votes	%	±%
Epping Residents	A. O'Brien*	751	34.4	N/A
Conservative	P. Jones	589	27.0	▼12.1
Liberal Democrats	J. Page	444	20.4	▼1.6
Labour	D. Shenfield	396	18.2	▼14.4
Majority		162	7.4	▲0.9
Turnout		2,180	45.6	▼3.1
Registered electors		4,781		
Epping Residents gain from Conservative		Swing		

=== Grange Hill ===
Grange Hill
Party	Candidate	Votes	%	±%
Conservative	Ms C. Barrack	939	49.2	▲0.8
Liberal Democrats	I. Gold	811	42.5	▲2.7
Labour	A. Wembourne	159	8.3	▼3.5
Majority		128	6.7	▼1.8
Turnout		1,909	41.0	▼8.0
Registered electors		4,656		
Conservative hold		Swing		

=== Greensted & Marden Ash ===
Greensted & Marden Ash
Party	Candidate	Votes	%	±%
Liberal Democrats	D. Jacobs	628	63.7	▲24.1
Conservative	W. White	289	29.3	▼20.4
Labour	Ms G. Huckle	69	7.0	▼3.7
Majority		339	34.4	▲44.5
Turnout		986	52.0	▲1.0
Registered electors		1,896		
Liberal Democrats gain from Conservative		Swing		

=== High Beech ===
High Beech
Party	Candidate	Votes	%	±%
Conservative	Antony Watts*	629	68.1	▼14.6
Labour	P. Chittock	294	31.9	▲14.6
Majority		335	36.3	▼29.0
Turnout		923	42.7	▼0.5
Registered electors		2,162		
Conservative hold		Swing		

=== Lambourne ===
Lambourne
Party	Candidate	Votes	%	±%
Conservative	M. Cutler	383	41.2	▼18.8
Liberal Democrats	K. Easlea	354	38.1	N/A
Labour	C. Pereira	193	20.8	▼4.0
Majority		29	3.1	▼32.1
Turnout		930	63.7	▼4.7
Registered electors		1,460		
Conservative hold		Swing		

Loughton Broadway
Party	Candidate	Votes	%	±%
Labour	Ms J. Davis	1,225	71.8	▼4.8
Conservative	Ms I. Holman	350	20.5	▲0.4
Liberal Democrats	Ms J. Netherclift	131	7.7	N/A
Majority		875	51.3	▲4.3
Turnout		1,706	41.4	▼14.2
Registered electors		4,121		
Labour hold		Swing		

=== Loughton Roding ===
Loughton Roding
Party	Candidate	Votes	%	±%
Labour	R. Baddock	760	41.9	▼0.2
Loughton Residents	Ms P. Meadows	592	32.6	▲2.1
Conservative	T. Morris*	464	25.6	▲0.5
Majority		168	9.3	▼2.3
Turnout		1,816	44.6	▼8.9
Registered electors		4,072		
Labour gain from Conservative		Swing		

=== Loughton St. Johns ===
Loughton St. Johns
Party	Candidate	Votes	%	±%
Loughton Residents	R. Curtis*	917	55.5	▲4.3
Conservative	Ms S. Creswell	497	30.1	▼1.9
Labour	P. Turner	239	14.5	▼2.3
Majority		420	25.4	▲6.1
Turnout		1,653	41.0	▼5.7
Registered electors		4,032		
Loughton Residents hold		Swing		

=== Moreton & Matching ===
Moreton & Matching
Party	Candidate	Votes	%	±%
Ind. Conservative	R. Morgan*	N/A	100.0	▲21.5
Majority		N/A	N/A	N/A
Turnout		N/A	N/A	N/A
Registered electors		1,566		
Ind. Conservative hold		Swing		

=== Nazeing ===
Nazeing
Party	Candidate	Votes	%	±%
Independent	Ms E. Downes*	1,119	72.0	N/A
Labour	D. Mills	436	28.0	▼6.6
Majority		683	43.9	N/A
Turnout		1,555	44.8	▼4.2
Registered electors		3,471		
Independent gain from Conservative		Swing		

=== North Weald Bassett ===
North Weald Bassett
Party	Candidate	Votes	%	±%
Conservative	D. Cousins	901	55.8	▲3.5
Labour	I. Standfast	417	25.8	▼7.6
Liberal Democrats	S. Ward	297	18.4	▲4.1
Majority		484	30.0	▲11
Turnout		1,615	37.4	▼7.6
Registered electors		4,318		
Conservative hold		Swing		

=== Shelley ===
Shelley
Party	Candidate	Votes	%	±%
Labour	R. Barnes*	434	63.1	▲2.6
Liberal Democrats	E. Notman	175	25.4	▲11.6
Conservative	Ms D. Swann	79	11.5	▼14.1
Majority		259	37.6	▲2.7
Turnout		688	48.8	▼3.4
Registered electors		1,410		
Labour hold		Swing		

=== Waltham Abbey East ===
Waltham Abbey East
Party	Candidate	Votes	%	±%
Conservative	D. Spinks*	1,081	55.8	▲18.3
Labour	P. Withers	858	44.2	▲8.4
Majority		223	11.5	▲9.9
Turnout		1,939	41.5	▼12.2
Registered electors		4,672		
Conservative hold		Swing		

=== Waltham Abbey Paternoster ===
Waltham Abbey Paternoster
Party	Candidate	Votes	%	±%
Labour	C. Hewins*	887	62.0	▲5.7
Conservative	Ms Y. Greensall	544	38.0	▲15.5
Majority		343	24.0	▼9.8
Turnout		1,431	41.9	▲0.6
Registered electors		3,415		
Labour hold		Swing		

=== Waltham Abbey West ===
Waltham Abbey West
Party	Candidate	Votes	%	±%
Conservative	H. Taylor	840	56.7	▲31.0
Labour	F. Harewood	642	43.3	▼3.0
Majority		198	13.4	N/A
Turnout		1,482	39.7	▼10.4
Registered electors		3,733		
Conservative hold		Swing		
