= 1990 Epping Forest District Council election =

1990 UK local government election

← 1988	3 May 1990	1991 →

19 out of 59 seats to Epping Forest District Council 30 seats needed for a majority
- Turnout: 50.2%

	First party	Second party	Third party
Party	Conservative	Labour	Loughton Residents
Last election	37 seats, 48.1%	11 seats, 29.3%	7 seats, 11.0%
Seats before	37	11	7
Seats after	36	13	7
Seat change	▼1	▲2	Steady
Popular vote	14,410	11,419	3,252
Percentage	39.7%	31.4%	8.9%
Swing	▼8.4%	▲2.1%	▼2.1%
	Fourth party	Fifth party	Sixth party
Party	SDP	Liberal Democrats	W. Abbey Residents
Last election	0 seats, 0.7%	2 seats, 10.7%	N/A
Seats before	0	2	0
Seats after	1	0	0
Seat change	▲1	▼2	Steady
Popular vote	1,296	4,325	1,366
Percentage	3.5%	11.9%	3.7%
Swing	▲2.8%	▲1.2%	N/A
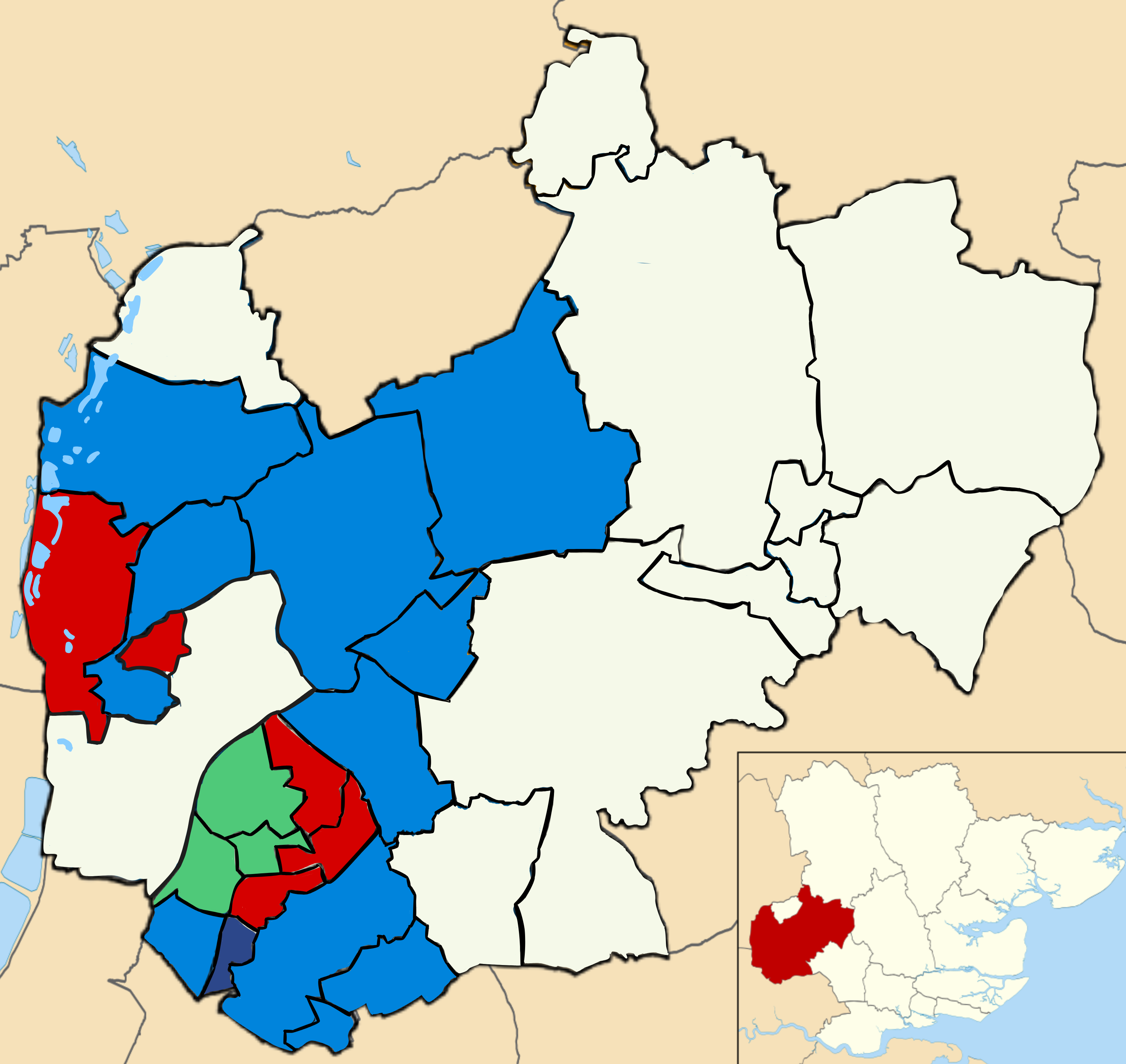
- Winner of each seat at the 1990 Epping Forest District Council election
Leader before election
Conservative
Leader after election
Conservative

The 1990 Epping Forest District Council election took place on 3 May 1990 to elect members of Epping Forest District Council in Essex, England. 19 members of Epping Forest District Council in Essex were elected. The council remained under Conservative majority control.

== Background ==
As with other English local elections held that spring, the contest occurred against the backdrop of significant national political upheaval and controversy surrounding the introduction of the Community Charge, better known as the "poll tax". A number of council seats were up for re-election across the district, and while the Conservative Party retained overall control, Labour and the local Residents Association candidates made notable advances in several wards.

The election followed district boundary changes introduced by the Essex (District Boundaries) Order 1989, which transferred small parts of Epping Forest district—specifically sections of the parishes of Matching and North Weald Bassett—into neighbouring Harlow District. The overall number of council seats remained the same, but the changes altered the electoral map to tiny extents ahead of polling day.

Results were mixed at ward level. Labour recorded strong performances in areas in Loughton such as Broadway, Debden Green, and Waltham Abbey Paternoster, and Waltham Abbey West, often securing clear majorities. The Conservatives held firm in many rural and suburban wards such as Chigwell Row, Chigwell Village, Theydon Bois, and Nazeing. The Liberal Democrats (contesting as Social and Liberal Democrats, SLD) and remnants of the Social Democratic Party also polled respectably in some wards, though rarely enough to overtake the two main parties. Local Residents groups and independents also retained influence in Loughton wards.

Nationally, the elections were shaped by widespread discontent with Prime Minister Margaret Thatcher’s Government. The introduction of the poll tax in England and Wales on 1 April 1990 had triggered mass protests, including a violent demonstration in London on 31 March, and millions of people refused payment. Labour, under Neil Kinnock, was ahead in opinion polls, buoyed by Conservative divisions over Europe and by resentment at high interest rates, which reached 15% by early 1990. The period also saw by-election swings against the Conservatives, most notably the Mid Staffordshire by-election in March, which Labour won on a large swing.

By November 1990 Thatcher would be forced to resign, toppled by her own MPs after Michael Heseltine challenged her leadership. The 1990 local elections, including those in Epping Forest, reflected the shifting political mood of the time, with the Conservatives retaining control locally but on increasingly fragile foundations.

== Summary ==
1990 Epping Forest District Council election
Party	This election			Full council			This election		
Party	Seats	Net	Seats %	Other	Total	Total %	Votes	Votes %	+/−
Conservative	10	▼1	52.6	26	36	61.0	14,410	39.7	▼8.4
Labour	5	▲2	26.3	8	13	22.0	11,419	31.4	▲2.1
Loughton Residents	3	Steady	5.0	4	7	11.8	3,252	8.9	▼2.1
SDP	1	▲1	5.2	0	1	1.6	1,296	3.5	▲2.8
Independent	1	Steady	1.6	0	1	1.6	N/A	N/A	N/A
Ind. Conservative	0	Steady	0.0	1	1	1.6	N/A	N/A	N/A
Liberal Democrats	0	▼2	0.0	0	0	0.0	4,325	11.9	▲1.2
W. Abbey Residents	0	Steady	0.0	0	0	0.0	1,366	3.7	N/A
BNP	0	Steady	0.0	0	0	0.0	326	0.8	N/A

== Results ==
=== Buckhurst Hill East ===
Buckhurst Hill East
Party	Candidate	Votes	%	±%
SDP	S. Robinson	1,012	44.2	N/A
Conservative	A. Torgut	561	24.5	▼21.3
Liberal Democrats	P. Spencer	389	17.0	▼19.9
Labour	B. Mooney	330	14.4	▼2.9
Majority		451	19.7	N/A
Turnout		2,292	58.0	▲18.2
Registered electors		3,962		
SDP gain from Liberal Democrats		Swing		

=== Buckhurst Hill West ===
Buckhurst Hill West
Party	Candidate	Votes	%	±%
Conservative	R. Braybrook*	1,336	58.8	▼6.0
Liberal Democrats	Ms S. Anderson	624	27.5	▲2.6
Labour	R. Baddock	312	13.7	▲4.3
Majority		712	31.3	▼8.6
Turnout		2,272	47.2	▲14.0
Registered electors		4,840		
Conservative hold		Swing		

=== Chigwell Row ===
Chigwell Row
Party	Candidate	Votes	%	±%
Conservative	R. Pratt	553	68.4	▲19.0
Liberal Democrats	Ms C. Bartrip	255	31.6	▼6.6
Majority		298	36.8	▲25.7
Turnout		808	46.0	▲2.0
Registered electors		1,763		
Conservative hold		Swing		

=== Chigwell Village ===
Chigwell Village
Party	Candidate	Votes	%	±%
Conservative	J. Murphy	1,031	72.8	▼6.7
Liberal Democrats	Ms J. Netherclift	386	27.2	▲16.0
Majority		645	45.5	▼22.8
Turnout		1,417	44.0	▼16.9
Registered electors		3,273		
Conservative hold		Swing		

=== Debden Green ===
Debden Green
Party	Candidate	Votes	%	±%
Labour	Ms J. Ormston	1,325	71.2	▼3.9
Conservative	L. Daniel	439	23.6	▼1.3
BNP	Ms I. Hernon	97	5.2	N/A
Majority		886	47.6	▼2.6
Turnout		1,861	46.1	▼11.5
Registered electors		3,984		
Labour hold		Swing		

=== Epping Hemnall ===
Epping Hemnall
Party	Candidate	Votes	%	±%
Conservative	Ms J. Ashbridge	933	42.6	▼16.5
Liberal Democrats	Ms S. Mann	608	27.8	▲11.2
Labour	D. Sturrock	512	23.4	▼0.9
SDP	G. Dunseath	135	6.2	N/A
Majority		325	14.8	▼17.7
Turnout		2,188	47.7	▲14.7
Registered electors		4,605		
Conservative hold		Swing		

=== Epping Lindsey ===
Epping Lindsey
Party	Candidate	Votes	%	±%
Conservative	June O'Brien*	929	39.1	▼13.7
Labour	D. Tetlow	775	32.6	▲4.3
Liberal Democrats	Janet Whitehouse	523	22.0	▲3.1
SDP	Ms L. Barry	149	6.3	N/A
Majority		154	6.5	▲18.0
Turnout		2,376	48.7	▲14.6
Registered electors		4,880		
Conservative hold		Swing		

=== Grange Hill ===
Grange Hill
Party	Candidate	Votes	%	±%
Conservative	P. Gunby	1,110	48.4	▼6.2
Liberal Democrats	A. Thompson	914	39.8	▲4.7
Labour	Ms J. Faiz	271	11.8	▲1.4
Majority		196	8.5	▼11.0
Turnout		1,695	49.0	▲15.3
Registered electors		4,700		
Conservative gain from Liberal Democrats		Swing		

=== Loughton Broadway ===
Loughton Broadway
Party	Candidate	Votes	%	±%
Labour	Stephen Murray*	1,765	76.6	▼3.1
Conservative	I. Holman	463	20.1	▼0.2
BNP	R. Jarvis	75	3.3	N/A
Majority		1,302	56.5	▼2.9
Turnout		2,303	55.6	▲17.7
Registered electors		4,145		
Labour hold		Swing		

=== Loughton Forest ===
Loughton Forest
Party	Candidate	Votes	%	±%
Loughton Residents	R. Gow*	780	54.6	▼8.6
Conservative	A. Brock	484	33.9	▲4.0
Labour	Ms E. Stewart	165	11.5	▲3.6
Majority		296	20.7	▼12.7
Turnout		1,429	48.6	▲9.2
Registered electors		2,939		
Loughton Residents hold		Swing		

=== Loughton Roding ===
Loughton Roding
Party	Candidate	Votes	%	±%
Labour	A. Larner	934	42.1	▼2.7
Loughton Residents	Ms P. Meadows	677	30.5	N/A
Conservative	A. Brock	557	25.1	▼30.1
BNP	S. Turnell	52	2.3	N/A
Majority		257	11.6	N/A
Turnout		2,220	53.5	▲13.9
Registered electors		4,157		
Labour gain from Conservative		Swing		

=== Loughton St. Johns ===
Loughton St. Johns
Party	Candidate	Votes	%	±%
Loughton Residents	Ms D. Rhodes*	970	51.2	▼1.6
Conservative	C. Finn	605	32.0	▼7.4
Labour	Ms C. Wardell	318	16.8	▲8.8
Majority		365	19.3	▲6.2
Turnout		1,893	46.7	▼6.8
Registered electors		4,059		
Loughton Residents hold		Swing		

=== Loughton St. Marys ===
Loughton St. Marys
Party	Candidate	Votes	%	±%
Loughton Residents	R. Heath	825	52.2	▼17.5
Conservative	H. Taylor	436	27.6	▲8.6
Labour	S. Barnes	319	20.2	▲8.8
Majority		389	24.6	▼26.1
Turnout		1,580	47.6	▲8.0
Registered electors		3,318		
Loughton Residents hold		Swing		

=== Nazeing ===
Nazeing
Party	Candidate	Votes	%	±%
Conservative	M. Welch	1,150	65.4	▲1.1
Labour	D. Mills	609	34.6	▲16.8
Majority		541	30.8	▼15.6
Turnout		1,759	49.0	▲2.6
Registered electors		3,607		
Conservative hold		Swing		

=== North Weald Bassett ===
North Weald Bassett
Party	Candidate	Votes	%	±%
Conservative	E. Hudspeth*	1,037	52.3	▼15.6
Labour	I. Standfast	661	33.4	▲19.7
Liberal Democrats	S. Ward	284	14.3	▼4.1
Majority		376	19.0	▼19.0
Turnout		1,982	45.0	▲2.8
Registered electors		4,393		
Conservative hold		Swing		

=== Theydon Bois ===
Theydon Bois
Party	Candidate	Votes	%	±%
Conservative	J. Padfield	940	62.9	▼19.1
Labour	Ms S. Gymer	339	22.7	▲4.7
Liberal Democrats	D. Weldon	216	14.4	N/A
Majority		601	40.2	▼23.8
Turnout		1,540	47.5	▲15.9
Registered electors		3,159		
Conservative hold		Swing		

=== Waltham Abbey East ===
Waltham Abbey East
Party	Candidate	Votes	%	±%
Conservative	J. O'Reilly*	964	37.5	▼18.5
Labour	F. Harewood	922	35.8	▼8.2
Waltham Abbey Residents	Ms G. Hall	562	21.8	N/A
Liberal Democrats	I. Myers	126	4.9	N/A
Majority		42	1.6	▼30.2
Turnout		2,574	53.7	▲21.9
Registered electors		4,792		
Conservative hold		Swing		

=== Waltham Abbey Paternoster ===
Waltham Abbey Paternoster
Party	Candidate	Votes	%	±%
Labour	S. Riley*	973	56.3	▼4.6
Conservative	D. Esau	389	22.5	▼16.6
Waltham Abbey Residents	Ms Y. Greensall	341	19.7	N/A
BNP	S. Hernon	25	1.4	N/A
Majority		584	33.8	▲12.1
Turnout		1,728	48.9	▲13.8
Registered electors		3,536		
Labour hold		Swing	▲1.4	

=== Waltham Abbey West ===
Waltham Abbey West
Party	Candidate	Votes	%	±%
Labour	P. Pennell	889	46.3	▲16.6
Conservative	G. Jialler*	493	25.7	▼31.2
Waltham Abbey Residents	Ms L. Dryden	463	24.1	N/A
BNP	S. Bone	77	4.0	N/A
Majority		396	20.6	N/A
Turnout		1,922	49.3	▲8.4
Registered electors		3,909		
Labour gain from Conservative		Swing		
