= 1988 Epping Forest District Council election =

1988 UK local government election

| ← 1987 | 5 May 1988 | 1990 → |

20 seats to Epping Forest District Council 1 by-election to Epping Hemnall 30 seats needed for a majority

| | First party | Second party | Third party |
|---|---|---|---|
| Party | Conservative | Labour | Loughton Residents |
| Last election | 34 seats, 52.0% | 12 seats, 23.8% | 6 seats, 3.4% |
| Seats before | 35 | 12 | 6 |
| Seats after | 37 | 11 | 7 |
| Seat change | ▲3 | ▼1 | ▲1 |
| Popular vote | 10,620 | 6,481 | 2,434 |
| Percentage | 48.1% | 29.3% | 11.0% |
| Swing | ▼3.9% | ▲5.5% | ▲7.6% |
| | Fourth party | Fifth party | Sixth party |
| Party | SLD | Independent | SDP |
| Last election | 4 seats, 18.6% (as Alliance) | 2 seats | N/A |
| Seats before | 4 | 1 | 0 |
| Seats after | 2 | 1 | 0 |
| Seat change | ▼2 | ▼1 | Steady |
| Popular vote | 2,373 | 0 | 168 |
| Percentage | 10.7% | 0.0% | 0.7% |
| Swing | ▼7.9% | N/A | N/A |
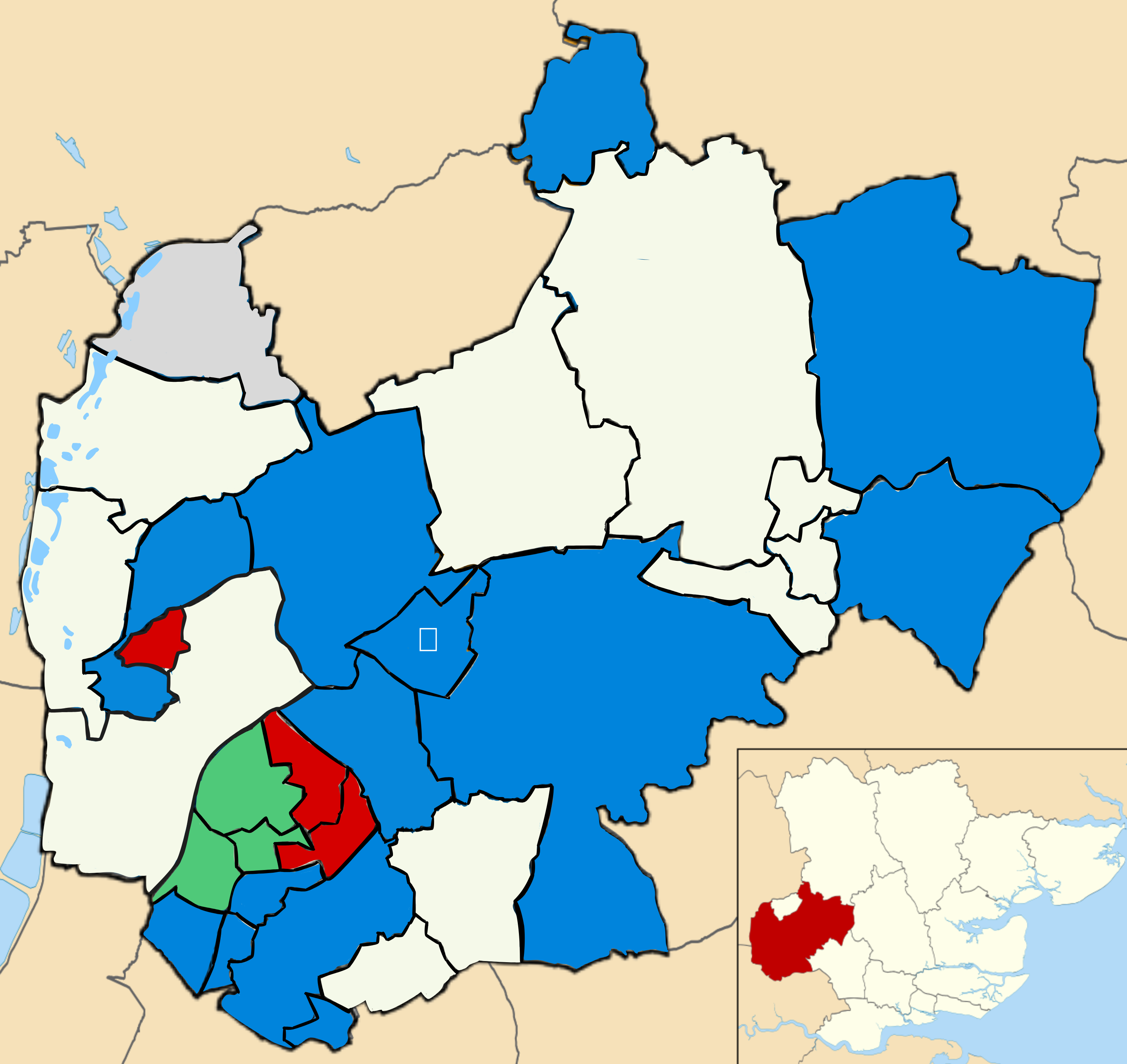
- Winner of each seat at the 1988 Epping Forest District Council election Rectangular inset (Epping Hemnall): By-election result
Leader before election
Conservative
Leader after election
Conservative

The 1988 Epping Forest District Council election took place on 5 May 1988 to elect members of Epping Forest District Council in Essex, England. 20 members of Epping Forest District Council in Essex were elected. The council remained under Conservative majority control.

== Background ==
The 1988 Epping Forest District Council election was held on 5 May 1988 to elect members of Epping Forest District Council in Essex, England. The Conservatives strengthened their control of the council, increasing their majority from the previous year. Labour suffered notable declines across the district, while the newly-formed Social and Liberal Democrats (SLD) - emerging from the recent merger of the Liberal Party and the Social Democratic Party - lost two of their existing seats and suffered a heavy fall in their vote share. Independent Councillor Ridgewell of Sheering joined the Conservatives ahead of these elections, retaining his seat at the election, which left Councillor Easton as the sole independent on the council.

Nationally, 1988 was a year of political consolidation and socio-economic change. Margaret Thatcher became the longest-serving prime minister of the century, while her government continued to oversee economic growth and declining unemployment, which fell to just over 2.5 million by March. The Social and Liberal Democrats emerged from the merger of the Liberal Party and the SDP, uniting centrist opposition forces but struggling to make major breakthroughs in local elections such as Epping Forest. The government implemented major tax cuts in the March budget and pursued inner-city regeneration schemes, while social issues, including public sector strikes and welfare debates, remained prominent.

The Conservative success in Epping Forest mirrored the national trend of growing support for the Tories in suburban and rural districts, consolidating their political dominance and leaving Labour and the SLD to contend with eroding influence at the local level. Overall, the 1988 council election reinforced Conservative control, reflecting both national political trends and local electoral realities.

Just 7 months after these elections, Epping Forest would see a by-election following the death of incumbent MP Sir John Biggs-Davison, who had served Epping Forest as its MP since 1974, and its predecessor seat of Chigwell since 1955. The Conservatives would hold the seat with 39.5% of the vote (a fall of 21.5% in 1987), with the Social and Liberal Democrats gaining 26.0%, coming just over 4,500 behind Steven Norris, who would serve as the MP for Epping Forest until 1997.

== Results summary ==
1988 Epping Forest District Council election
| Party | This election | | | Full council | | | This election | | |
| Party | Seats | Net | Seats % | Other | Total | Total % | Votes | Votes % | +/− |
|---|---|---|---|---|---|---|---|---|---|
| Conservative | 14 | ▲3 | 73.6 | 23 | 37 | 62.7 | 10,620 | 48.1 | ▼3.9 |
| Labour | 3 | ▼1 | 5.0 | 8 | 11 | 18.6 | 6,481 | 29.3 | ▲5.5 |
| Loughton Residents | 3 | ▲1 | 5.0 | 4 | 7 | 11.8 | 2,434 | 11.0 | ▲7.6 |
| Liberal | 0 | ▼2 | 0.0 | 2 | 2 | 3.3 | 2,373 | 10.7 | ▼7.9 |
| Independent | 1 | ▼1 | 1.6 | 0 | 1 | 1.6 | 0 | 0.0 | N/A |
| Ind. Conservative | 0 | Steady | 0.0 | 1 | 1 | 1.6 | N/A | N/A | N/A |
| SDP | 0 | Steady | 0.0 | 0 | 0 | 0.0 | 168 | 0.7 | N/A |

=== Buckhurst Hill East ===
Buckhurst Hill East
| Party | Candidate | Votes | % | ±% |
|---|---|---|---|---|
| Conservative | P. Yearley | 708 | 45.8 | ▼0.2 |
| SLD | S. Anderson | 571 | 36.9 | ▼5.6 |
| Labour | S. Goodwin | 268 | 17.3 | ▲5.8 |
| Majority | | 137 | 8.9 | ▲5.4 |
| Turnout | | 1,547 | 39.8 | ▼10.0 |
| Registered electors | | 3,887 | | |
| Conservative gain from SLD | | Swing | | |

=== Buckhurst Hill West ===
Buckhurst Hill West
| Party | Candidate | Votes | % | ±% |
|---|---|---|---|---|
| Conservative | L. Welch* | 1,017 | 64.8 | ▼0.8 |
| SLD | R. Eveling | 391 | 24.9 | ▼4.1 |
| Labour | R. Baddock | 162 | 10.3 | ▲4.9 |
| Majority | | 626 | 39.9 | ▲3.3 |
| Turnout | | 1,570 | 33.2 | ▼11.1 |
| Registered electors | | 4,729 | | |
| Conservative hold | | Swing | | |

=== Chigwell Village ===
Chigwell Village
| Party | Candidate | Votes | % | ±% |
|---|---|---|---|---|
| Conservative | J. Gilliham | 701 | 79.5 | ▲20.9 |
| SLD | C. Bartrip | 99 | 11.2 | ▼13.6 |
| Labour | B. Mooney | 82 | 9.3 | ▲1.9 |
| Majority | | 602 | 68.3 | ▼34.4 |
| Turnout | | 882 | 27.1 | ▼8.1 |
| Registered electors | | 3,255 | | |
| Conservative hold | | Swing | | |

=== Debden Green ===
Debden Green
| Party | Candidate | Votes | % | ±% |
|---|---|---|---|---|
| Labour | C. Huckle* | 1,020 | 75.1 | ▲13.7 |
| Conservative | J. Yates | 338 | 24.9 | ▼13.7 |
| Majority | | 682 | 50.2 | ▲27.3 |
| Turnout | | 1,358 | 34.6 | ▼3.4 |
| Registered electors | | 3,925 | | |
| Labour hold | | Swing | | |

=== Epping Hemnall ===
Epping Hemnall
| Party | Candidate | Votes | % | ±% |
|---|---|---|---|---|
| Conservative | M. Aldworth* | 872 | 59.1 | ▲0.9 |
| Conservative | A. Rose | 840 | | |
| Labour | D. Tetlow | 358 | 24.3 | ▲7.9 |
| Labour | D. Wing | 339 | | |
| SLD | J. Gent | 245 | 16.6 | ▼8.8 |
| SLD | S. Mann | 234 | | |
| Majority | | 514 | 32.5 | ▼0.3 |
| Turnout | | 1,579 | 33.0 | ▼9.0 |
| Registered electors | | 4,376 | | |
| Conservative hold | | Swing | | |
| Conservative hold | | Swing | | |

=== Epping Lindsey ===
Epping Lindsey
| Party | Candidate | Votes | % | ±% |
|---|---|---|---|---|
| Conservative | R. Brady | 880 | 52.8 | ▲4.8 |
| Labour | D. Sturrock | 471 | 28.3 | ▲12.6 |
| SLD | D. Gent | 315 | 18.9 | ▼17.5 |
| Majority | | 409 | 24.5 | ▲12.9 |
| Turnout | | 1,666 | 34.1 | ▼12.6 |
| Registered electors | | 4,886 | | |
| Conservative hold | | Swing | | |

=== Grange Hill ===
Grange Hill
| Party | Candidate | Votes | % | ±% |
|---|---|---|---|---|
| Conservative | M. Tomkins | 867 | 54.6 | ▲0.8 |
| SLD | G. West | 557 | 35.1 | ▼5.0 |
| Labour | G. Easter | 165 | 10.4 | ▲4.3 |
| Majority | | 310 | 19.5 | ▲5.8 |
| Turnout | | 1,589 | 33.7 | ▼12.8 |
| Registered electors | | 4,715 | | |
| Conservative gain from SLD | | Swing | | |

=== High Ongar ===
High Ongar
| Party | Candidate | Votes | % | ±% |
|---|---|---|---|---|
| Conservative | D. Morton* | 249 | 55.2 | ▲0.1 |
| SDP | S. Ormsby | 168 | 37.3 | N/A |
| Labour | L. Horgan | 34 | 7.5 | ▼14.2 |
| Majority | | 81 | 18.0 | ▼13.9 |
| Turnout | | 451 | 51.1 | ▼8.1 |
| Registered electors | | 883 | | |
| Conservative hold | | Swing | | |

=== Loughton Broadway ===
Loughton Broadway
| Party | Candidate | Votes | % | ±% |
|---|---|---|---|---|
| Labour | H. Worby* | 1,258 | 79.7 | ▲12.3 |
| Conservative | A. Swallow | 320 | 20.3 | ▼12.3 |
| Majority | | 938 | 59.4 | ▲24.6 |
| Turnout | | 1,578 | 37.9 | ▼1.6 |
| Registered electors | | 4,164 | | |
| Labour hold | | Swing | | |

=== Loughton Forest ===
Loughton Forest
| Party | Candidate | Votes | % | ±% |
|---|---|---|---|---|
| Loughton Residents | K. Ellis | 741 | 63.2 | ▲2.9 |
| Conservative | L. Pugh | 350 | 29.9 | ▼2.4 |
| Labour | H. McSweeney | 81 | 6.9 | ▼0.5 |
| Majority | | 391 | 33.4 | ▲5.4 |
| Turnout | | 1,172 | 39.4 | ▼6.3 |
| Registered electors | | 2,975 | | |
| Loughton Residents hold | | Swing | | |

=== Loughton Roding ===
Loughton Roding
| Party | Candidate | Votes | % | ±% |
|---|---|---|---|---|
| Conservative | J. Fairbanks | 911 | 55.2 | ▲2.8 |
| Labour | J. Ormston | 739 | 44.8 | ▲11.0 |
| Majority | | 172 | 10.4 | ▼8.3 |
| Turnout | | 1,650 | 39.6 | ▼5.7 |
| Registered electors | | 4,167 | | |
| Conservative gain from Labour | | Swing | | |

=== Loughton St. Johns ===
Loughton St. Johns
| Party | Candidate | Votes | % | ±% |
|---|---|---|---|---|
| Loughton Residents | R. Wilmot | 877 | 52.6 | ▼4.0 |
| Conservative | C. Finn | 658 | 39.4 | ▲3.9 |
| Labour | C. Wardell | 133 | 8.0 | ▲0.1 |
| Majority | | 219 | 13.1 | N/A |
| Turnout | | 1,668 | 39.9 | ▼5.8 |
| Registered electors | | 4,180 | | |
| Loughton Residents gain from Conservative | | Swing | | |

=== Loughton St. Marys ===
Loughton St. Marys
| Party | Candidate | Votes | % | ±% |
|---|---|---|---|---|
| Loughton Residents | D. Paddon* | 816 | 69.7 | ▲13.4 |
| Conservative | G. Best | 222 | 19.0 | ▼11.3 |
| Labour | A. Bryant | 133 | 11.4 | ▼2.0 |
| Majority | | 594 | 50.7 | ▼24.7 |
| Turnout | | 1,171 | 39.6 | ▼2.0 |
| Registered electors | | 2,957 | | |
| Loughton Residents hold | | Swing | | |

=== Passingford ===
Passingford
| Party | Candidate | Votes | % | ±% |
|---|---|---|---|---|
| Conservative | J. Pledge* | N/A | N/A | N/A |
| Majority | | N/A | N/A | N/A |
| Turnout | | N/A | N/A | N/A |
| Registered electors | | 1,457 | | |
| Conservative hold | | Swing | | |

=== Roothing Country ===
Roothing Country
| Party | Candidate | Votes | % | ±% |
|---|---|---|---|---|
| Conservative | G. Green* | 391 | 66.7 | ▼18.9 |
| SLD | D. Kelly | 195 | 33.3 | N/A |
| Majority | | 196 | 33.4 | ▼37.7 |
| Turnout | | 586 | 48.7 | ▲10.3 |
| Registered electors | | 1,203 | | |
| Conservative hold | | Swing | | |

=== Roydon ===
Roydon
| Party | Candidate | Votes | % | ±% |
|---|---|---|---|---|
| Independent | W. Easton* | N/A | N/A | N/A |
| Majority | | N/A | N/A | N/A |
| Turnout | | N/A | N/A | N/A |
| Registered electors | | 2,140 | | |
| Independent hold | | Swing | | |

=== Sheering ===
Sheering
| Party | Candidate | Votes | % | ±% |
|---|---|---|---|---|
| Conservative | M. Ridgewell* | N/A | N/A | N/A |
| Majority | | N/A | N/A | N/A |
| Turnout | | N/A | N/A | N/A |
| Registered electors | | 1,857 | | |
| Conservative gain from Independent | | Swing | | |

=== Theydon Bois ===
Theydon Bois
| Party | Candidate | Votes | % | ±% |
|---|---|---|---|---|
| Conservative | W. Axon* | 819 | 82.0 | ▲18.1 |
| Labour | J. Davy | 180 | 18.0 | ▲7.5 |
| Majority | | 639 | 64.0 | ▲25.7 |
| Turnout | | 999 | 31.6 | ▼9.7 |
| Registered electors | | 3,161 | | |
| Conservative hold | | Swing | | |

=== Waltham Abbey East ===
Waltham Abbey East
| Party | Candidate | Votes | % | ±% |
|---|---|---|---|---|
| Conservative | D. Demetriou | 845 | 56.0 | ▼10.5 |
| Labour | D. Sherman | 663 | 44.0 | ▲10.5 |
| Majority | | 182 | 12.1 | ▼20.9 |
| Turnout | | 1,508 | 31.8 | ▼11.3 |
| Registered electors | | 4,742 | | |
| Conservative hold | | Swing | | |

=== Waltham Abbey Paternoster ===
Waltham Abbey Paternoster
| Party | Candidate | Votes | % | ±% |
|---|---|---|---|---|
| Labour | P. Bourn | 734 | 60.9 | ▲10.4 |
| Conservative | A. Day | 472 | 39.1 | ▼10.5 |
| Majority | | 262 | 21.7 | ▲20.7 |
| Turnout | | 1,206 | 35.1 | ▼6.2 |
| Registered electors | | 3,436 | | |
| Labour hold | | Swing | | |
