= 1987 Epping Forest District Council election =

1987 UK local government election

← 1986	7 May 1987	1988 →

19 seats to Epping Forest District Council 30 seats needed for a majority

	First party	Second party	Third party
Party	Conservative	Labour	Loughton Residents
Last election	34 seats, 40.6%	12 seats, 28.8%	6 seats, 10.5%
Seats before	34	12	6
Seats after	34	12	6
Seat change	Steady	Steady	Steady
Popular vote	16,453	7,538	1,092
Percentage	52.0%	23.8%	3.4%
Swing	▲11.4%	▼5.0%	▼7.1%
	Fourth party	Fifth party	Sixth party
Party	Alliance	Independent	Ind. Conservative
Last election	4 seats, 19.3%	2 seats, 0.3%	N/A
Seats before	4	2	1
Seats after	4	2	1
Seat change	Steady	Steady	Steady
Popular vote	5,896	N/A	666
Percentage	18.6%	N/A	2.1%
Swing	▼0.7%	N/A	N/A
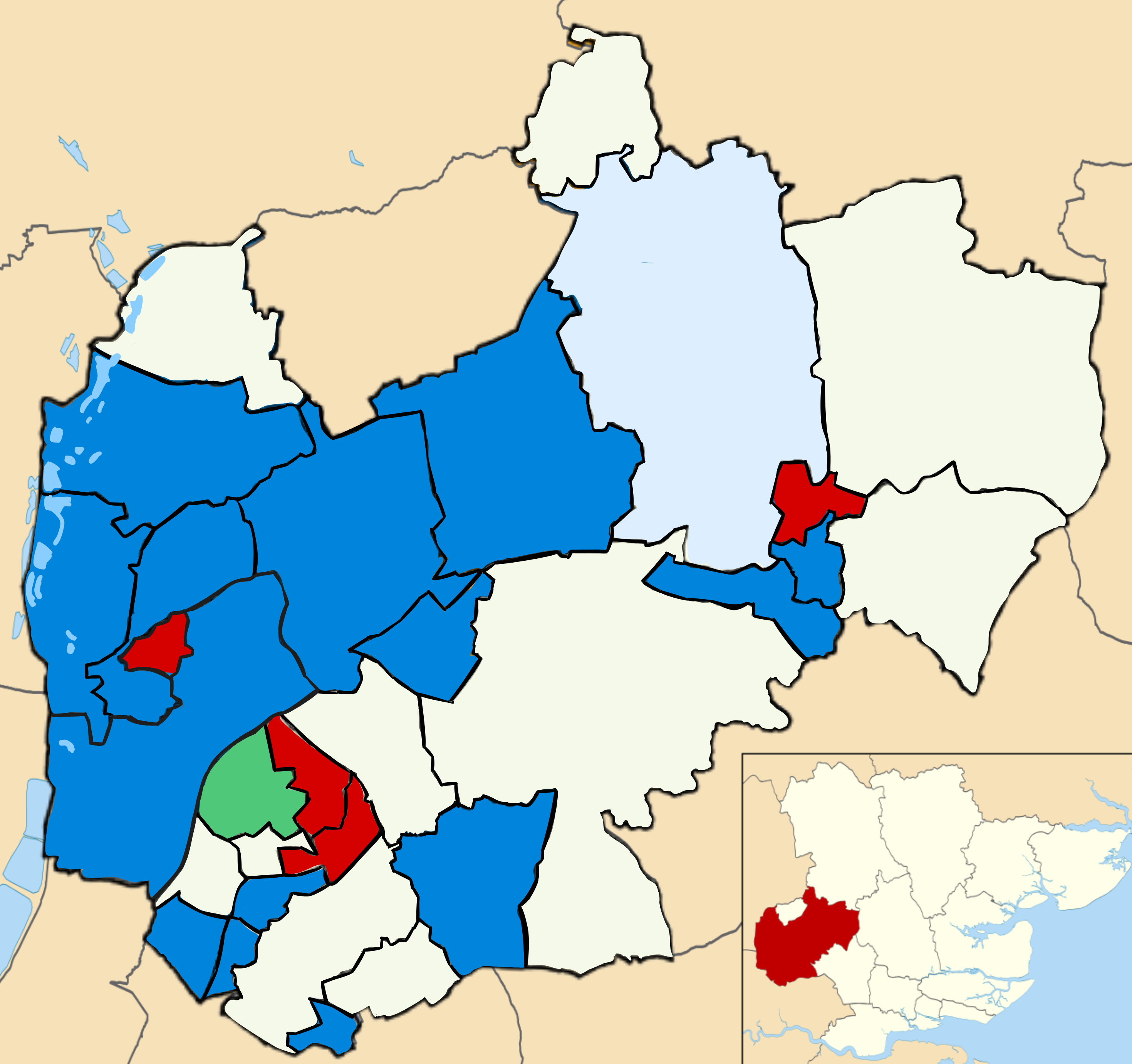
- Winner of each seat at the 1987 Epping Forest District Council election
Leader before election
Conservative
Leader after election
Conservative

The 1987 Epping Forest District Council election took place on 7 May 1987 to elect members of Epping Forest District Council in Essex, England. 19 members of Epping Forest District Council in Essex were elected. The council remained under Conservative majority control.

== Background ==
The 1987 Epping Forest District Council election was held on 7 May 1987 to elect members of Epping Forest District Council in Essex, England. These were held against a backdrop of political turbulence and shifting national fortunes. Britain entered the year under the grip of the January cold wave, one of the most severe in decades, which left much of the country paralysed by snow and sub-zero temperatures. Meanwhile, the Conservative government continued its programme of privatisation, with British Airways floated on the stock exchange in February, signalling the pace of economic change. National politics was also shaken by tragedy and controversy: the capsizing of the Herald of Free Enterprise in March, the IRA bombing in Rheindahlen, and a string of by-elections that revealed fluctuating fortunes for the opposition parties, particularly the SDP–Liberal Alliance.

Locally, the Conservatives managed to hold overall control of the council, consolidating their strength in several key wards. They made notable gains in the vote share in Paternoster, Loughton Broadway, and Debden Green, taking advantage of a decline in Labour support across the district. In some areas, the party's dominance was overwhelming, with margins of over 60% of the vote, reflecting both the national economic optimism of early 1987 and the strong organisational base the Conservatives enjoyed in Essex.

The SDP–Liberal Alliance, despite retaining a solid vote share, was unable to convert this support into additional seats. Their position remained largely static, with respectable second-place finishes in wards such as Buckhurst Hill East and Grange Hill, but without the breakthroughs that had been seen in neighbouring authorities earlier in the decade.

Labour, by contrast, endured a difficult election. Their vote share fell by more than five percentage points across the district, leaving them struggling to defend seats outside traditional strongholds such as Shelley and Debden. The results underlined the party's weakness in suburban Essex on the eve of the 1987 general election, where similar patterns would be repeated on a national scale.

== Results summary ==
1987 Epping Forest District Council election
Party	This election			Full council			This election		
Party	Seats	Net	Seats %	Other	Total	Total %	Votes	Votes %	+/−
Conservative	14	Steady	73.6	20	34	57.6	16,453	52.0	▲11.4
Labour	4	Steady	21.0	8	12	20.3	7,538	23.8	▼5.0
Loughton Residents	1	Steady	5.2	5	6	10.1	1,092	3.4	▼7.2
Liberal	0	Steady	0.0	4	4	6.6	5,896	18.6	▼0.7
Independent	0	Steady	0.0	2	2	3.3	N/A	N/A	N/A
Ind. Conservative	1	Steady	5.2	1	1	1.6	666	2.1	N/A

== Ward results ==
=== Buckhurst Hill East ===
Buckhurst Hill East
Party	Candidate	Votes	%	±%
Conservative	M. Bell	890	46.0	▲7.3
Alliance	J. Lowe	822	42.5	▼0.9
Labour	S. Goodwin	223	11.5	▼6.4
Majority		68	3.5	▼1.2
Turnout		1,935	49.8	▲0.4
Registered electors		3,885		
Conservative hold		Swing		

=== Buckhurst Hill West ===
Buckhurst Hill West
Party	Candidate	Votes	%	±%
Conservative	I. Beattie*	1,378	65.6	▲14.9
Alliance	L. Eveling	610	29.0	▼9.8
Labour	L. Baddock	114	5.4	▼5.0
Majority		768	36.6	▲24.7
Turnout		2,102	44.3	▲5.4
Registered electors		4,744		
Conservative hold		Swing		

=== Chipping Ongar ===
Chipping Ongar
Party	Candidate	Votes	%	±%
Conservative	F. Love*	396	49.9	▼2.5
Alliance	D. Jacobs	326	41.1	▼6.5
Labour	R. Gross	72	9.1	N/A
Majority		70	8.8	▲3.9
Turnout		794	59.8	▲4.8
Registered electors		1,328		
Conservative hold		Swing		

=== Debden Green ===
Debden Green
Party	Candidate	Votes	%	±%
Labour	D. Martin	935	61.4	▼4.5
Conservative	C. Finn	587	38.6	▲18.5
Majority		348	22.9	▼22.9
Turnout		1,522	38.0	▼3.5
Registered electors		4,009		
Labour hold		Swing		

=== Epping Hemnall ===
Epping Hemnall
Party	Candidate	Votes	%	±%
Conservative	P. Jones	1,150	58.2	▲13.1
Alliance	S. Mann	501	25.4	▼2.0
Labour	I. Bell	325	16.4	▼11.1
Majority		649	32.8	5.4
Turnout		1,976	42.0	▲3.8
Registered electors		4,709		
Conservative hold		Swing		

=== Epping Lindsey ===
Epping Lindsey
Party	Candidate	Votes	%	±%
Conservative	A. O'Brien*	1,125	48.0	▲6.2
Alliance	D. Gent	853	36.4	▲5.7
Labour	D. Sturrock	367	15.7	▼11.8
Majority		272	11.6	▲0.5
Turnout		2,345	46.7	▲5.4
Registered electors		5,017		
Conservative hold		Swing		

=== Grange Hill ===
Grange Hill
Party	Candidate	Votes	%	±%
Conservative	A. Bryant*	1,187	53.8	▲14.0
Alliance	G. West	884	40.1	▼11.3
Labour	K. Dracott	134	6.1	▼2.7
Majority		303	13.7	▲2.1
Turnout		2,205	46.5	▲9.0
Registered electors		4,747		
Conservative hold		Swing		

=== Greensted & Marden Ash ===
Greensted & Marden Ash
Party	Candidate	Votes	%	±%
Conservative	C. Henson	524	49.7	▼6.8
Alliance	S. Ormsby	417	39.6	▲18.0
Labour	P. Hughes	113	10.7	▼11.2
Majority		107	10.2	▼24.4
Turnout		1,054	54.0	▲5.0
Registered electors		1,951		
Conservative hold		Swing		

=== High Beech ===
High Beech
Party	Candidate	Votes	%	±%
Conservative	A. Watts	782	82.7	▲28.1
Labour	H. McSweeney	164	17.3	N/A
Majority		618	65.3	▲33.6
Turnout		946	43.2	▲8.0
Registered electors		2,189		
Conservative hold		Swing		

=== Lambourne ===
Lambourne
Party	Candidate	Votes	%	±%
Conservative	R. Amanet*	621	60.0	▲2.4
Labour	G. Huckle	257	24.8	▼17.6
Alliance	K. Easlea	157	15.2	N/A
Majority		364	35.2	▲20.0
Turnout		1,035	68.4	▲4.6
Registered electors		1,514		
Conservative hold		Swing		

=== Loughton Broadway ===
Loughton Broadway
Party	Candidate	Votes	%	±%
Labour	J. Davis*	1,125	67.4	▼3.4
Conservative	A. Swallow	545	32.6	▲18.5
Majority		580	34.7	▼22.0
Turnout		1,670	39.5	▼4.3
Registered electors		4,230		
Labour hold		Swing		

=== Loughton Roding ===
Loughton Roding
Party	Candidate	Votes	%	±%
Conservative	T. Morris	1,003	52.4	▲6.8
Labour	G. Owen	646	33.8	▼0.1
Alliance	A. Humphris	264	13.8	▲5.7
Majority		357	18.7	▲7.0
Turnout		1,913	45.3	▼3.6
Registered electors		4,223		
Conservative hold		Swing		

=== Loughton St. Johns ===
Loughton St. Johns
Party	Candidate	Votes	%	±%
Loughton Residents	R. Curtis*	1,092	56.6	▲2.1
Conservative	J. Manning	685	35.5	▲1.8
Labour	C. Wardell	153	7.9	▲4.0
Majority		407	21.1	▲0.3
Turnout		1,930	45.7	Steady
Registered electors		4,222		
Loughton Residents hold		Swing		

=== Moreton & Matching ===
Moreton & Matching
Party	Candidate	Votes	%	±%
Ind. Conservative	R. Morgan*	666	78.5	▲4.6
Alliance	S. Ormsby	182	21.5	▼4.6
Majority		484	57.1	▲9.4
Turnout		848	51.2	▼35.5
Registered electors		1,657		
Ind. Conservative hold		Swing		

=== Nazeing ===
Nazeing
Party	Candidate	Votes	%	±%
Conservative	E. Downes*	1,148	64.3	▼35.7
Alliance	G. Wigoder	319	17.9	N/A
Labour	I. Brent	318	17.8	N/A
Majority		829	46.4	▼53.6
Turnout		1,785	48.5	N/A
Registered electors		3,677		
Conservative hold		Swing		

=== North Weald Bassett ===
North Weald Bassett
Party	Candidate	Votes	%	±%
Conservative	I. Abbey*	1,263	67.9	▼32.1
Alliance	J. Whitehouse	343	18.4	N/A
Labour	D. Tetlow	255	13.7	N/A
Majority		920	49.4	▼50.6
Turnout		1,861	42.2	N/A
Registered electors		4,412		
Conservative hold		Swing		

=== Shelley ===
Shelley
Party	Candidate	Votes	%	±%
Labour	R. Barnes*	446	60.5	▼17.8
Conservative	J. Innocent	189	25.6	▲3.9
Alliance	G. Harmon	102	13.8	N/A
Majority		257	34.9	▼21.6
Turnout		737	52.2	▲0.7
Registered electors		1,412		
Labour hold		Swing		

=== Waltham Abbey East ===
Waltham Abbey East
Party	Candidate	Votes	%	±%
Conservative	D. Spinks	1,387	66.5	▲16.1
Labour	A. Davidson	699	33.5	▼5.1
Majority		688	33.0	▲21.2
Turnout		2,086	43.1	▼2.5
Registered electors		4,843		
Conservative hold		Swing		

=== Waltham Abbey Paternoster ===
Waltham Abbey Paternoster
Party	Candidate	Votes	%	±%
Labour	C. Hewins*	737	50.5	▼15.5
Conservative	J. Day	722	49.5	▲15.5
Majority		15	1.0	▼30.0
Turnout		1,459	41.3	▲5.6
Registered electors		3,533		
Labour hold		Swing		

=== Waltham Abbey West ===
Waltham Abbey West
Party	Candidate	Votes	%	±%
Conservative	W. Weiland	871	56.9	▲3.5
Labour	D. Sherman	455	29.7	▼16.9
Alliance	R. Dunstan	206	13.4	N/A
Majority		416	27.2	▲20.5
Turnout		1,532	40.9	▲3.0
Registered electors		3,750		
Conservative hold		Swing		
