= 1992 Epping Forest District Council election =

1992 UK local government election

- 7 May 1992

20 out of 59 seats to Epping Forest District Council 30 seats needed for a majority

	First party	Second party	Third party
Party	Conservative	Labour	Loughton Residents
Last election	30 seats, 36.9%	14 seats, 30.6%	7 seats, 5.3%
Seats before	30	14	7
Seats after	28	14	7
Seat change	▼2	Steady	Steady
Popular vote	10,287	4,386	2,555
Percentage	44.9%	19.1%	11.1%
Swing	▲8.0%	▼11.5%	▲5.3%
	Fourth party	Fifth party	Sixth party
Party	SDP	Liberal Democrats	Epping Residents
Last election	2 seats, 4.7%	2 seats, 15.8%	1 seat, 4.0%
Seats before	2	2	1
Seats after	3	2	2
Seat change	▲1	Steady	▲1
Popular vote	1,888	1,889	1,129
Percentage	8.2%	8.2%	4.9%
Swing	▲3.5%	▼7.6%	▲0.9%
	Seventh party	Eighth party
Party	Independent	Ind. Conservative
Last election	2 seats, 3.9%	1 seat, 0.0%
Seats before	2	1
Seats after	2	1
Seat change	Steady	Steady
Popular vote	617	59
Percentage	2.6%	0.2%
Swing	▼1.3	N/A
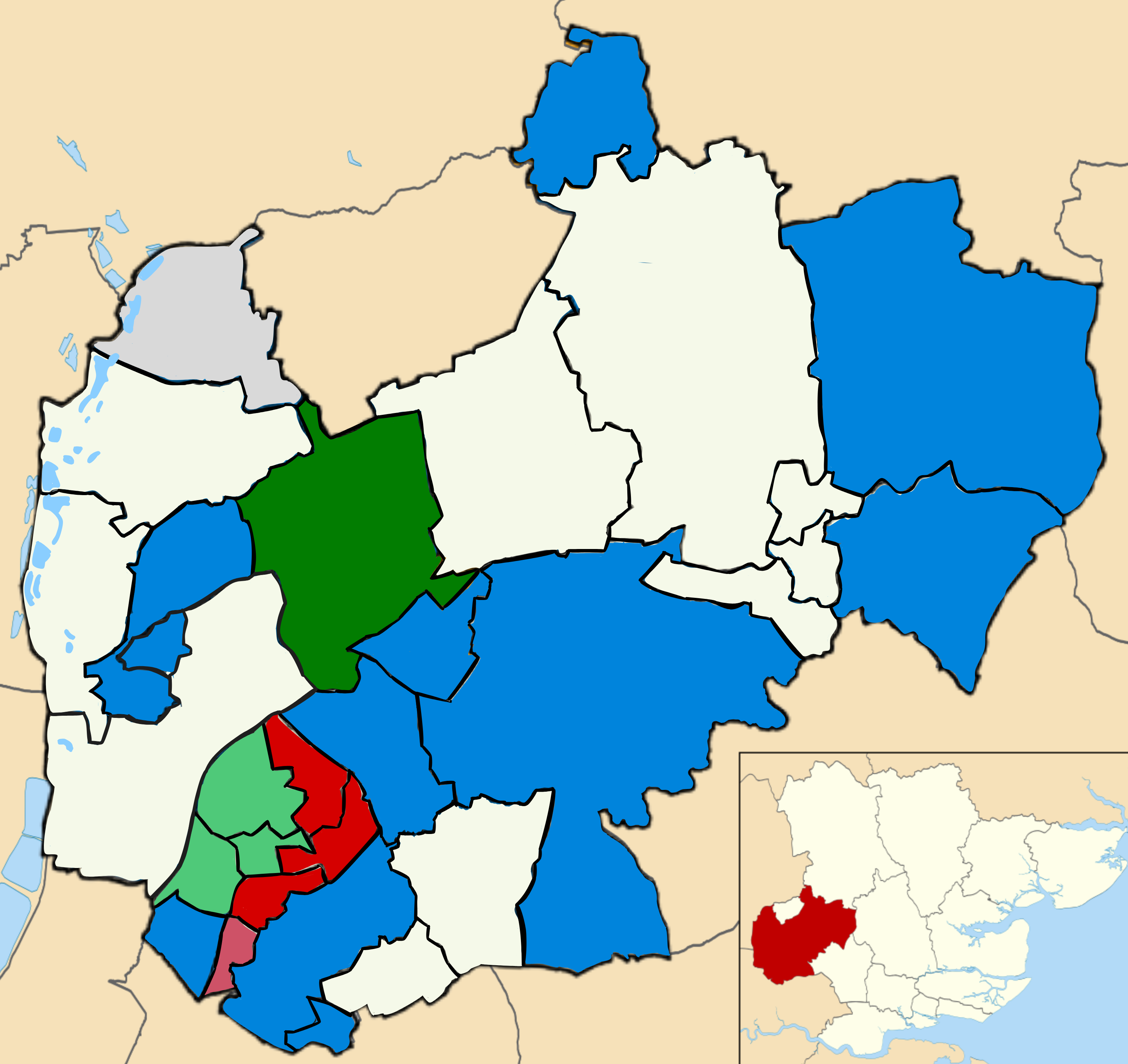
- Winner of each seat at the 1991 Epping Forest District Council election
Leader before election
Conservative
Leader after election
Conservative minority administration
No overall control

The 1992 Epping Forest District Council election took place on 7 May 1992 to elect members of Epping Forest District Council in Essex, England. 20 members of Epping Forest District Council in Essex were elected. The council remained under Conservative majority control.

== Background ==
The 1992 Epping Forest District Council election took place in May 1992 to elect members of Epping Forest District Council in Essex, England. As with other local elections across England, one-third of the council's seats were contested. The election occurred against the backdrop of an ongoing national recession, which had seen over two years of rising unemployment, peaking at 2.6 million by March 1992. Economic recovery had begun to show tentative signs, with small growth recorded in the early months of 1992, though concerns over jobs, public services, and local taxation remained prominent in voters’ minds.

Turnout varied widely across wards, ranging from just over 29% in Debden Green to nearly 60% in Roothing Country, reflecting differing levels of voter engagement depending on local issues and contest intensity. The results also demonstrated several narrow margins, particularly in competitive wards such as Buckhurst Hill West and Epping Lindsey, signaling areas where opposition parties could target in future elections.

Overall, the 1992 election reiterated the Conservative Party’s dominance in Epping Forest District Council while providing opportunities for Labour, the Liberal Democrats, and local resident associations to consolidate support in specific areas. The election outcomes mirrored broader national political dynamics, with economic uncertainty and public debate over government performance influencing local voter behaviour.

== Results summary ==
1992 Epping Forest District Council election
Party	This election			Full council			This election		
Party	Seats	Net	Seats %	Other	Total	Total %	Votes	Votes %	+/−
Conservative	11	▼2	55.0	17	28	47.4	10,287	44.9	▲8.0
Labour	3	Steady	15.0	11	14	23.7	4,386	19.1	▼11.5
Loughton Residents	3	Steady	3.0	5.0	7	11.8	2,555	11.1	▲5.3
SDP	1	▲1	1.6	2	3	5.0	1,888	8.2	▲3.5
Liberal Democrats	0	Steady	0.0	2	2	3.3	1,889	8.2	▼7.6
Epping Residents	1	▲1	1.6	1	2	3.3	1,129	4.9	▲3.5
Independent	1	Steady	1.6	1	2	3.3	617	2.6	▼1.3
Ind. Social Democrat	0	Steady	0.0	0	0	0.0	105	0.4	N/A
Ind. Conservative	0	Steady	0.0	0	1	0.0	59	0.2	N/A

== Ward results ==
=== Buckhurst Hill East ===
Buckhurst Hill East
Party	Candidate	Votes	%	±%
SDP	Ms J. Croke	873	50.3	▲7.3
Conservative	P. Yearly*	505	29.1	▲2.5
Liberal Democrats	P. Spencer	202	11.6	▼8.1
Labour	Ms L. Baddock	156	9.0	▼1.8
Majority		368	21.2	N/A
Turnout		1,736	43.9	▼3.5
Registered electors		3,953		
SDP gain from Conservative		Swing		

=== Buckhurst Hill West ===
Buckhurst Hill West
Party	Candidate	Votes	%	±%
Conservative	J. Fairbanks	897	46.3	▼2.1
SDP	P. Mason	878	45.3	N/A
Liberal Democrats	D. Jenkinson	163	8.4	▼16.5
Majority		19	1.0	▼19.7
Turnout		1,938	40.1	▼0.3
Registered electors		4,838		
Conservative hold		Swing		

=== Chigwell Village ===
Chigwell Village
Party	Candidate	Votes	%	±%
Conservative	J. Gilliham*	796	79.5	▲11.1
Liberal Democrats	Ms J. Netherclift	146	14.6	▼17.0
Ind. Conservative	A. Marshall	59	5.9	N/A
Majority		650	64.9	▼28.1
Turnout		1,001	31.0	▼15.0
Registered electors		3,229		
Conservative hold		Swing		

=== Debden Green ===
Debden Green
Party	Candidate	Votes	%	±%
Labour	C. Huckle*	785	67.9	▼0.9
Conservative	L. Daniel	371	32.1	▲9.8
Majority		414	35.8	▼8.6
Turnout		1,156	29.7	▼5.8
Registered electors		3,896		
Labour hold		Swing		

=== Epping Hemnall ===
Epping Hemnall
Party	Candidate	Votes	%	±%
Conservative	P. Burns	801	48.6	▲5.8
Epping Residents	J. Solomons	458	27.8	▲8.0
Labour	B. Johns	236	14.3	▼3.7
Liberal Democrats	A. Black	152	9.2	▼10.2
Majority		343	20.8	▼2.2
Turnout		1,647	35.8	▼10.0
Registered electors		4,603		
Conservative hold		Swing		

=== Epping Lindsey ===
Epping Lindsey
Party	Candidate	Votes	%	±%
Epping Residents	Ms J. Jones	671	38.3	▲3.9
Conservative	R. Brady*	639	36.5	▲9.5
Labour	D. Sturrock	263	15.0	▼3.2
Liberal Democrats	J. Page	177	10.1	▼10.3
Majority		32	1.8	N/A
Turnout		1,750	36.2	▼9.4
Registered electors		4,832		
Epping Residents Association gain from Conservative		Swing		

=== Grange Hill ===
Grange Hill
Party	Candidate	Votes	%	±%
Conservative	M. Tomkins*	931	61.0	▲11.8
Liberal Democrats	I. Gold	495	32.4	▼10.1
Labour	B. Mooney	100	6.6	▼1.6
Majority		436	28.6	▲21.9
Turnout		1,526	32.8	▼8.2
Registered electors		4,659		
Conservative hold		Swing		

=== High Ongar ===
High Ongar
Party	Candidate	Votes	%	±%
Conservative	D. Morton*	241	62.0	▲6.8
Ind. Social Democrat	S. Ormsby	105	27.0	▼10.3
Labour	K. Tait	43	11.1	▲3.6
Majority		136	35.0	▲17.0
Turnout		389	44.3	▼6.8
Registered electors		879		
Conservative hold		Swing		

=== Loughton Broadway ===
Loughton Broadway
Party	Candidate	Votes	%	±%
Labour	H. Worby*	1,060	71.4	▼0.4
Conservative	Ms I. Holman	425	28.6	▲8.1
Majority		635	42.8	▼9.5
Turnout		1,485	36.0	▲5.4
Registered electors		4,124		
Labour hold		Swing		

=== Loughton Forest ===
Loughton Forest
Party	Candidate	Votes	%	±%
Loughton Residents	Ms K. Ellis*	688	55.2	▲0.6
Conservative	E. Buttling	484	38.8	▲4.9
Labour	Ms E. Stewart	74	5.9	▼5.6
Majority		204	16.4	▼4.3
Turnout		1,246	43.0	▼5.6
Registered electors		2,898		
Loughton Residents hold		Swing		

=== Loughton Roding ===
Loughton Roding
Party	Candidate	Votes	%	±%
Labour	S. Goodwin	819	45.9	▲4.0
Conservative	T. Morris	538	30.2	▲4.6
Loughton Residents	Ms P. Meadows	427	23.9	▼8.7
Majority		281	15.8	N/A
Turnout		1,784	43.8	▼0.8
Registered electors		4,072		
Labour gain from Conservative		Swing		

=== Loughton St. Johns ===
Loughton St. Johns
Party	Candidate	Votes	%	±%
Loughton Residents	R. Wilmot*	749	53.1	▼2.4
Conservative	Ms M. Bhonsle	487	34.5	▲4.4
Labour	A. Crick	174	12.3	▼2.2
Majority		262	18.6	▼6.8
Turnout		1,410	34.9	▼6.1
Registered electors		4,037		
Loughton Residents hold		Swing		

=== Loughton St. Marys ===
Loughton St. Marys
Party	Candidate	Votes	%	±%
Loughton Residents	M. Wardle	691	58.0	▲5.8
Conservative	L. Marriott	324	27.2	▼0.4
Labour	S. Barnes	176	14.8	▼5.4
Majority		367	30.8	▲6.2
Turnout		1,191	36.3	▼11.3
Registered electors		3,278		
Loughton Residents hold		Swing		

=== Passingford ===
Passingford
Party	Candidate	Votes	%	±%
Conservative	J. Pledge*	N/A	N/A	N/A
Majority		N/A	N/A	N/A
Turnout		N/A	N/A	N/A
Registered electors		1,544		
Conservative hold		Swing		

=== Roothing Country ===
Roothing Country
Party	Candidate	Votes	%	±%
Conservative	W. White	456	60.2	▼6.5
Liberal Democrats	D. Kelly	301	39.8	▲6.5
Majority		155	20.4	▼13.0
Turnout		757	59.9	▲11.2
Registered electors		1,264		
Conservative hold		Swing		

=== Roydon ===
Roydon
Party	Candidate	Votes	%	±%
Independent	W. Easton*	617	83.9	N/A
SDP	J. Bradshaw	118	16.1	N/A
Majority		499	67.8	N/A
Turnout		735	34.1	▲34.1
Registered electors		2,153		
Independent hold		Swing		

=== Sheering ===
Sheering
Party	Candidate	Votes	%	±%
Conservative	M. Ridgewell*	485	68.6	▼31.4
Labour	Ms J. Finlay	222	31.4	N/A
Majority		263	37.2	N/A
Turnout		707	35.3	▲35.3
Registered electors		2,003		
Conservative hold		Swing		

=== Theydon Bois ===
Theydon Bois
Party	Candidate	Votes	%	±%
Conservative	W. Axon*	832	76.7	▲13.8
Liberal Democrats	D. Weldon	253	23.3	▲0.6
Majority		579	53.4	▲13.2
Turnout		1,085	34.6	▼12.9
Registered electors		3,137		
Conservative hold		Swing		

=== Waltham Abbey East ===
Waltham Abbey East
Party	Candidate	Votes	%	±%
Conservative	Ms E. Webster	1,075	66.2	▲10.4
Labour	F. Harewood	548	33.8	▼10.4
Majority		527	32.4	▲20.9
Turnout		1,623	34.0	▲7.5
Registered electors		4,778		
Conservative hold		Swing		

=== Waltham Abbey Paternoster ===
Waltham Abbey Paternoster
Party	Candidate	Votes	%	±%
Conservative	Ms J. Cave	774	56.8	▲18.8
Labour	R. Sharp	589	43.2	▼18.8
Majority		185	13.6	N/A
Turnout		1,363	39.2	▲1.7
Registered electors		3,477		
Conservative gain from Labour		Swing		
