= Opinion polling for the 1992 United Kingdom general election =

Opinion polling for the 1992 United Kingdom general election was carried out by various organisations to gauge voting intention. Results of such polls are displayed in this article. The date range for these opinion polls range from the previous election on 11 June 1987 to the election on 9 April 1992.

Almost every poll leading up to polling day predicted either a hung parliament with Labour the largest party, or a small Labour majority of around 19 to 23. Polls on the last few days before the country voted predicted a very slim Labour majority. After the polls closed, the BBC and ITV exit polls still predicted that there would be a hung parliament and "that the Conservatives would only just get more seats than Labour".

With opinion polls at the end of the campaign showing Labour and the Conservatives neck and neck, the actual election result, a small Conservative majority, was a surprise to many in the media and in polling organisations. The apparent failure of the opinion polls to come close to predicting the actual result led to an inquiry by the Market Research Society. Following the election, most opinion polling companies changed their methodology in the belief that a 'Shy Tory factor' affected the polling.

== Graphical summary ==
UK opinion polling for the election (trendline is local regression) Conservative Labour Liberal-SDP Alliance / Liberal Democrats SDP

== National poll results ==
Most national opinion polls do not cover Northern Ireland, which has different major political parties from the rest of the United Kingdom. The detailed results of parties in the 'others' column can sometimes be found under 'show'. All data is from UK Polling Report.

=== 1992 ===
Survey end date	Pollster	Client	Con	Lab	LD	Lead
9 Apr 1992	1992 general election		42.8%	35.2%	18.3%	7.6
8 Apr	NOP	The Independent	39%	42%	17%	3
8 Apr	Gallup	The Daily Telegraph	38.5%	38%	20%	0.5
8 Apr	MORI	The Times	38%	39%	20%	1
7 Apr	ICM	The Guardian	38%	38%	20%	Tie
7 Apr	Harris	ITN	38%	40%	18%	2
6 Apr	MORI	YTV	37%	40%	20%	3
4 Apr	Harris	Daily Express	37%	38%	21%	1
4 Apr	Harris	The Observer	38%	40%	17%	2
3 Apr	NOP	The Mail on Sunday	35%	41%	20%	6
3 Apr	MORI	The Sunday Times	37%	39%	21%	2
3 Apr	Gallup	The Sunday Telegraph	37.5%	37.5%	21%	Tie
3 Apr	NOP	The Independent on Sunday	38%	41%	17%	3
3 Apr	ICM	Press Association	36.2%	38.7%	20.4%	2.5
1 Apr	ICM	Sunday Express	37%	39%	19%	2
1 Apr	Gallup	The Daily Telegraph	38%	37.5%	20.5%	0.5
31 Mar	NOP	The Independent	37%	39%	19%	2
31 Mar	Neilsen	N/A	39.8%	39.6%	17.2%	0.2
31 Mar	Harris	ITN	35%	41%	19%	6
30 Mar	ICM	The Guardian	37%	41%	18%	4
30 Mar	Harris	Daily Express	40%	39%	17%	1
29 Mar	MORI	The Times	35%	42%	19%	7
28 Mar	Audience Selection	N/A	37%	39%	19%	2
28 Mar	NOP	The Independent on Sunday	39%	40%	16%	1
27 Mar	NOP	The Mail on Sunday	37%	41%	18%	4
27 Mar	MORI	The Sunday Times	38%	40%	20%	2
27 Mar	Harris	The Observer	40%	38%	17%	2
25 Mar	ICM	Sunday Express	36%	38%	20%	2
25 Mar	NOP	The Independent	39%	42%	14%	3
24 Mar	Gallup	The Daily Telegraph	40%	40.5%	16.5%	0.5
24 Mar	MORI	N/A	38%	41%	17%	3
24 Mar	ICM	The Guardian	39%	40%	17%	1
23 Mar	NMR	EUR	38%	39%	19%	1
23 Mar	Harris	Daily Express	43%	38%	15%	5
23 Mar	Harris	ITN	38%	42%	16%	4
21 Mar	MORI	The Times	38%	41%	17%	3
21 Mar	NOP	The Independent on Sunday	38%	40%	16%	2
20 Mar	NOP	The Mail on Sunday	39%	41%	15%	2
20 Mar	MORI	The Sunday Times	38%	41%	19%	3
20 Mar	Harris	The Observer	40%	39%	17%	1
18 Mar	ICM	Sunday Express	37%	42%	16%	5
18 Mar	Gallup	The Daily Telegraph	40.5%	38.5%	18%	2
17 Mar	NOP	The Independent	38%	42%	17%	4
16 Mar	Dissolution of Parliament and the official start of the election campaign					
16 Mar	ICM	The Guardian	38%	43%	16%	5
16 Mar	Harris	Daily Express	41%	38%	17%	3
13 Mar	MORI	The Times	38%	43%	16%	5
13 Mar	Harris	Daily Express	39%	40%	16%	1
13 Mar	Harris	London Weekend Television	37%	41%	17%	4
13 Mar	MORI	The Sunday Times	40%	39%	16%	1
13 Mar	NOP	The Independent on Sunday	40%	41%	14%	1
12 Mar	ICM	Sunday Express	39%	40%	16%	1
12 Mar	MORI	The Times	38%	41%	16%	3
12 Mar	Harris	The Observer	40%	43%	12%	3
11 Mar	Gallup	N/A	41%	38.5%	15%	2.5
10 Mar	NOP	The Mail on Sunday	41%	40%	15%	1
7 Mar	Gallup	The Daily Telegraph	37%	38%	20%	1
7 Mar	NOP	The Mail on Sunday	38%	41%	16%	3
6 Mar	ICM	The Guardian	39%	42%	15%	3
2 Mar	Harris	The Observer	39%	40%	14%	1
25 Feb	Gallup	The Daily Telegraph	38.5%	38.5%	18.5%	Tie
25 Feb	Gallup	The Daily Telegraph	37%	37.5%	20%	0.5
23 Feb	MORI	The Sunday Times	39%	40%	18%	1
22 Feb	Audience Selection	N/A	36%	38%	18%	2
18 Feb	ICM	Daily Mail	38%	41%	17%	3
17 Feb	Gallup	The Daily Telegraph	39%	37%	19%	2
14 Feb	NOP	The Independent	38%	42%	15%	4
13 Feb	ICM	Sunday Express	40%	39%	16%	1
11 Feb	Harris	The Observer	39%	40%	15%	1
8 Feb	Gallup	The Daily Telegraph	40%	37.5%	17.5%	2.5
7 Feb	ICM	The Guardian	40%	40%	16%	Tie
6 Feb	NOP	The Independent on Sunday	38%	42%	15%	4
3 Feb	Harris	Daily Express	39%	40%	17%	1
28 Jan	Gallup	The Daily Telegraph	42.5%	37.5%	14%	5
26 Jan	Gallup	The Daily Telegraph	38%	39.5%	17.5%	1.5
25 Jan	Audience Selection	N/A	40%	40%	15%	Tie
23 Jan	ICM	Daily Mail	41%	40%	13%	1
21 Jan	Harris	Daily Express	41%	40%	14%	1
21 Jan	Gallup	The Daily Telegraph	40%	38%	16.5%	2
17 Jan	MORI	The Sunday Times	42%	39%	16%	3
16 Jan	ICM	Sunday Express	41%	42%	14%	1
13 Jan	Harris	The Observer	42%	43%	13%	1
13 Jan	Gallup	The Daily Telegraph	42%	37.5%	16%	4.5
11 Jan	NOP	The Independent	40%	43%	13%	3
8 Jan	ICM	The Guardian	42%	41%	12%	1
8 Jan	NOP	The Independent on Sunday	40%	45%	12%	5

=== 1991 ===
Survey end date	Pollster	Client	Con	Lab	LD	Lead
27 Dec	MORI	The Sunday Times	38%	44%	14%	6
15 Dec	Gallup	The Sunday Telegraph	42%	41.5%	13%	0.5
13 Dec	NOP	The Independent on Sunday	41%	40%	14%	1
7 Dec	ICM	The Guardian	39%	42%	14%	3
5 Dec	MORI	The Times	40%	43%	12%	3
2 Dec	Gallup	The Daily Telegraph	39.5%	37%	19%	2.5
2 Dec	Audience Selection	N/A	39%	40%	16%	1
25 Nov	MORI	The Sunday Times	40%	42%	15%	2
25 Nov	NOP	The Independent	40%	41%	15%	1
23 Nov	MORI	The Sunday Times	41%	43%	13%	2
23 Nov	ICM	Daily Mail	39%	41%	16%	2
14 Nov	Harris	The Observer	39%	44%	13%	5
9 Nov	ICM	The Guardian	41%	43%	13%	2
7 Nov	Hemsworth by-election (Lab hold), Kincardine and Deeside by-election (LD gain from Con) and Langbaurgh by-election (Lab gain from Con)					
4 Nov	Gallup	The Daily Telegraph	36%	44%	15.5%	8
1 Nov	MORI	The Sunday Times	42%	41%	13%	1
28 Oct	Audience Selection	N/A	37%	42%	16%	5
27 Oct	Harris	The Observer	39%	45%	12%	6
26 Oct	ICM	Daily Mail	40%	42%	13%	2
21 Oct	MORI	The Sunday Times	39%	45%	12%	6
21 Oct	NOP	The Independent	39%	45%	12%	6
17 Oct	Harris	The Observer	39%	46%	12%	7
12 Oct	ICM	The Guardian	41%	43%	12%	2
5 Oct	NOP	The Independent on Sunday	39%	46%	13%	7
4 Oct	Gallup	The Daily Telegraph	39.5%	41.5%	15%	2
3 Oct	ICM	Press Association	40%	42%	13%	2
30 Sep	Gallup	The Daily Telegraph	42%	38%	15%	4
30 Sep	Audience Selection	N/A	41%	37%	14%	4
28 Sep	ICM	Daily Mail	40%	42%	14%	2
26 Sep	Harris	The Observer	40%	41%	13%	1
26 Sep	NOP	The Mail on Sunday	40%	39%	16%	1
24 Sep	MORI	The Sunday Times	39%	39%	17%	Tie
23 Sep	Gallup	The Sunday Telegraph	40%	38.5%	16%	1.5
23 Sep	NOP	The Independent	39%	42%	14%	3
20 Sep	MORI	N/A	39%	43%	14%	4
14 Sep	ICM	The Guardian	39%	39%	17%	Tie
13 Sep	ICM	Sunday Express	41%	37%	17%	4
12 Sep	Harris	The Observer	43%	38%	16%	5
7 Sep	NOP	The Independent on Sunday	41%	39%	15%	2
2 Sep	Gallup	The Daily Telegraph	39.5%	35%	19.5%	4.5
27 Aug	MORI	The Sunday Times	42%	40%	14%	2
24 Aug	ICM	Daily Mail	40%	43%	12%	3
19 Aug	NOP	The Independent	38%	44%	12%	6
15 Aug	Harris	The Observer	40%	41%	14%	1
10 Aug	ICM	The Guardian	36%	45%	16%	9
5 Aug	Gallup	The Daily Telegraph	36%	41%	16.5%	5
1 Aug	Audience Selection	N/A	39%	40%	15%	1
29 Jul	Audience Selection	N/A	35%	43%	15%	8
24 Jul	ICM	Daily Express	38%	44%	13%	6
22 Jul	MORI	N/A	38%	43%	15%	5
20 Jul	ICM	Daily Mail	37%	44%	16%	7
18 Jul	Harris	The Observer	39%	42%	14%	3
15 Jul	NOP	The Independent	39%	43%	13%	4
6 Jul	ICM	The Guardian	37%	43%	16%	6
4 Jul	Liverpool Walton by-election (Lab hold)					
1 Jul	Gallup	The Daily Telegraph	37%	40.5%	17%	3.5
27 Jun	NOP	The Mail on Sunday	41%	42%	13%	1
24 Jun	MORI	N/A	39%	41%	15%	2
21 Jun	ICM	Daily Mail	35%	44%	17%	9
21 Jun	MORI	Sunday Express	39%	38%	17%	1
17 Jun	NOP	The Independent	37%	45%	14%	8
13 Jun	Harris	The Observer	35%	45%	16%	10
8 Jun	ICM	The Guardian	34%	44%	17%	10
3 Jun	Gallup	The Daily Telegraph	33.5%	41.5%	21%	8
2 Jun	Harris	TV-AM	36%	43%	15%	7
1 Jun	NMR	The Independent on Sunday	37%	43%	16%	6
1 Jun	Audience Selection	N/A	41%	42%	13%	1
28 May	MORI	The Sunday Times	37%	43%	16%	6
25 May	ICM	Daily Mail	37%	41%	16%	4
20 May	NOP	The Independent	36%	44%	15%	8
18 May	Audience Selection	N/A	39%	39%	19%	Tie
16 May	Harris	The Observer	38%	42%	16%	4
16 May	Monmouth by-election (Lab gain from Con)					
11 May	ICM	The Guardian	37%	43%	16%	6
6 May	Gallup	The Daily Telegraph	38.5%	38%	18%	0.5
2 May	Local elections in England and Wales					
29 Apr	Audience Selection	N/A	43%	38%	14%	5
27 Apr	NMR	The Independent on Sunday	47%	37%	14%	10
27 Apr	ICM	Daily Mail	39%	41%	14%	2
26 Apr	Harris	Sunday Express	41%	41%	14%	Tie
26 Apr	Gallup	The Sunday Telegraph	42%	39%	14%	3
22 Apr	MORI	The Sunday Times	42%	40%	15%	2
22 Apr	NOP	The Independent	41%	41%	13%	Tie
18 Apr	Harris	The Observer	40%	40%	14%	Tie
6 Apr	ICM	The Guardian	39%	43%	13%	4
4 Apr	Neath by-election (Lab hold)					
3 Apr	ICM	Daily Express	38%	40%	19%	2
30 Mar	Gallup	The Daily Telegraph	39.5%	34.5%	18%	5
25 Mar	MORI	The Sunday Times	40%	40%	16%	Tie
24 Mar	ICM	Daily Mail	41%	40%	15%	1
22 Mar	MORI	Sunday Express	38%	44%	15%	6
21 Mar	ICM	Daily Express	37%	40%	14%	3
14 Mar	Harris	The Observer	40%	39%	17%	1
12 Mar	Audience Selection	N/A	44%	32%	19%	12
11 Mar	NOP	The Independent	38%	39%	18%	1
9 Mar	ICM	The Guardian	39%	40%	16%	1
8 Mar	MORI	Sunday Express	41%	37%	16%	4
7 Mar	Ribble Valley by-election (LD gain from Con)					
5 Mar	NOP	N/A	43%	38%	11%	5
4 Mar	Harris	The Observer	47%	39%	9%	8
1 Mar	Gallup	The Daily Telegraph	45%	36.5%	13%	8.5
25 Feb	MORI	The Sunday Times	44%	41%	11%	3
23 Feb	ICM	Daily Mail	44%	43%	9%	1
16 Feb	NMR	The Independent on Sunday	47%	40%	8%	7
14 Feb	Harris	The Observer	46%	42%	8%	4
13 Feb	NOP	The Independent	45%	42%	9%	3
9 Feb	ICM	The Guardian	44%	42%	9%	2
4 Feb	Gallup	The Daily Telegraph	42%	42.5%	10%	0.5
4 Feb	Audience Selection	N/A	46%	39%	8%	7
3 Feb	Harris	The Observer	47%	39%	9%	8
28 Jan	Audience Selection	N/A	51%	34%	8%	17
21 Jan	MORI	The Sunday Times	46%	41%	9%	5
17 Jan	Harris	The Observer	46%	41%	9%	5
14 Jan	NOP	The Independent	43%	44%	8%	1
12 Jan	ICM	The Guardian	43%	43%	10%	Tie
11 Jan	Harris	ITN	47%	41%	7%	6
10 Jan	MORI	The Times	44%	42%	11%	2
7 Jan	Gallup	The Daily Telegraph	43%	41.5%	10%	1.5
6 Jan	Audience Selection	N/A	39%	43%	11%	4

=== 1990 ===
Survey end date	Pollster	Client	Con	Lab	LD	SDP	Lead
28 Dec	MORI	The Sunday Times	41%	45%	9%	–	4
13 Dec	Harris	The Observer	44%	40%	10%	–	4
10 Dec	Gallup	The Daily Telegraph	43%	40.5%	10.5%	–	2.5
10 Dec	NOP	The Independent	47%	42%	7%	–	5
8 Dec	ICM	The Guardian	45%	43%	9%	–	2
3 Dec	Audience Selection	N/A	49%	36%	9%	–	13
1 Dec	NMR	The Independent on Sunday	48%	40%	8%	–	8
29 Nov	Paisley North by-election and Paisley South by-election (both Lab holds)						
27–28 Nov	John Major is elected leader of the Conservative Party and becomes Prime Minister						
28 Nov	Harris	ITN	49%	38%	9%	–	11
26 Nov	Audience Selection	N/A	44%	37%	12%	–	7
26 Nov	Gallup	The Daily Telegraph	44%	41%	10%	–	3
26 Nov	NOP	The Independent	49%	38%	9%	–	11
23 Nov	Gallup	The Sunday Telegraph	43%	41.5%	11%	–	1.5
23 Nov	ICM	The Sunday Correspondent	46%	40%	10%	–	6
22 Nov	Margaret Thatcher announces she will resign as Prime Minister and leader of the Conservative Party						
19 Nov	MORI	The Sunday Times	38%	46%	12%	–	8
19 Nov	Gallup	The Daily Telegraph	36%	44.5%	10.5%	–	8.5
19 Nov	NOP	The Independent	40%	45%	11%	–	5
18 Nov	Gallup	The Sunday Telegraph	35%	48%	11%	–	13
17 Nov	NMR	The Independent on Sunday	42%	44%	11%	–	2
16 Nov	MORI	The Sunday Times	37%	48%	11%	–	11
16 Nov	ICM	The Sunday Correspondent	37%	49%	9%	–	12
15 Nov	Harris	ITN	34%	49%	13%	–	15
15 Nov	Harris	The Observer	34%	49%	13%	–	15
15 Nov	MORI	The Times	41%	45%	10%	–	4
14 Nov	NOP	The Independent	32%	46%	15%	–	14
10 Nov	ICM	The Guardian	33%	49%	13%	–	16
8 Nov	Bootle by-election and Bradford North by-election (both Lab holds)						
3 Nov	NMR	The Independent on Sunday	32%	49%	13%	–	17
3 Nov	NOP	The Mail on Sunday	30%	51%	12%	–	21
29 Oct	Audience Selection	N/A	36%	40%	13%	–	4
29 Oct	Gallup	The Daily Telegraph	31.5%	46%	15.5%	–	14.5
28 Oct	Harris	The Observer	32%	48%	14%	–	16
27 Oct	ICM	The Sunday Correspondent	34%	44%	14%	–	10
22 Oct	MORI	The Sunday Times	33%	49%	14%	–	16
22 Oct	NOP	The Independent	35%	45%	15%	–	10
18 Oct	Eastbourne by-election (LD gain from Con)						
13 Oct	ICM	The Guardian	36%	49%	9%	–	13
1 Oct	Gallup	The Sunday Telegraph	31.5%	46%	14%	–	14.5
29 Sep	NMR	The Independent on Sunday	33%	52%	10%	–	19
27 Sep	Knowsley South by-election (Lab hold)						
24 Sep	MORI	The Sunday Times	38%	45%	12%	–	7
24 Sep	NOP	The Independent	39%	44%	12%	–	5
22 Sep	ICM	The Sunday Correspondent	35%	44%	12%	–	9
20 Sep	Harris	The Observer	38%	46%	10%	–	8
8 Sep	ICM	The Guardian	37%	50%	8%	–	13
8 Sep	Gallup	The Daily Telegraph	31.5%	46%	14%	–	14.5
3 Sep	Gallup	The Daily Telegraph	35.5%	48%	8.5%	–	12.5
3 Sep	Audience Selection	N/A	38%	45%	6%	–	7
1 Sep	Audience Selection	N/A	32%	45%	15%	–	13
25 Aug	ICM	The Sunday Correspondent	37%	51%	6%	–	14
23 Aug	Harris	The Observer	38%	46%	10%	–	8
20 Aug	MORI	The Sunday Times	35%	50%	10%	–	15
13 Aug	NOP	The Independent	36%	48%	7%	–	12
11 Aug	ICM	The Guardian	38%	49%	9%	–	11
30 Jul	Audience Selection	N/A	35%	46%	9%	–	11
30 Jul	Gallup	The Daily Telegraph	33.5%	48%	11.5%	–	14.5
23 Jul	MORI	The Sunday Times	38%	46%	10%	–	8
21 Jul	ICM	The Sunday Correspondent	36%	52%	7%	–	16
19 Jul	Harris	The Observer	37%	49%	7%	–	12
16 Jul	NOP	The Independent	37%	50%	7%	–	13
7 Jul	ICM	The Guardian	35%	51%	8%	–	16
2 Jul	Gallup	The Daily Telegraph	36%	47%	9%	–	11
2 Jul	Audience Selection	N/A	39%	44%	7%	–	5
23 Jun	ICM	The Sunday Correspondent	36%	53%	5%	–	17
21 Jun	Harris	The Observer	37%	48%	8%	–	11
18 Jun	NOP	The Independent	37%	48%	8%	–	11
18 Jun	MORI	The Sunday Times	38%	49%	8%	–	11
9 Jun	ICM	The Guardian	35%	54%	5%	–	19
8 Jun	NMR	The Independent on Sunday	36%	49%	9%	–	13
4 Jun	Gallup	The Daily Telegraph	29.5%	53%	7.5%	2.5%	23.5
3 Jun	The SDP announces it will dissolve and deregister as a party						
28 May	Audience Selection	N/A	37%	47%	5%	3%	10
26 May	ICM	The Sunday Correspondent	36%	50%	5%	1%	14
24 May	Harris	The Observer	32%	50%	9%	1%	18
24 May	Bootle by-election (Lab hold)						
21 May	NOP	The Independent	34%	49%	8%	2%	15
21 May	MORI	The Sunday Times	35%	48%	8%	4%	13
17 May	Upper Bann by-election (UUP hold)						
12 May	ICM	The Guardian	32%	50%	8%	4%	18
4 May	NOP	The Mail on Sunday	34%	47%	8%	3%	13
3 May	Local elections in England and Scotland						
30 Apr	Audience Selection	N/A	32%	49%	6%	4%	17
30 Apr	Gallup	The Daily Telegraph	32%	47%	7.5%	4%	15
28 Apr	NOP	The Independent on Sunday	31%	51%	7%	3%	20
28 Apr	ICM	The Sunday Correspondent	30%	53%	8%	2%	23
24 Apr	MORI	The Sunday Times	31%	54%	6%	3%	23
22 Apr	NOP	The Independent	29%	54%	7%	3%	25
19 Apr	Harris	The Observer	32%	54%	7%	1%	22
7 Apr	NMR	The Independent on Sunday	30%	54%	5%	4%	24
7 Apr	ICM	The Guardian	32%	56%	4%	2%	24
6 Apr	ICM	N/A	32%	54%	5%	2%	22
2 Apr	Gallup	The Daily Telegraph	28%	52.5%	7.5%	3.5%	24.5
26 Mar	Audience Selection	N/A	30%	51%	6%	3%	21
24 Mar	NOP	The Independent on Sunday	33%	52%	6%	3%	19
23 Mar	ICM	N/A	28%	55%	7%	2%	27
22 Mar	Harris	The Observer	29%	57%	6%	3%	28
22 Mar	Mid Staffordshire by-election (Lab gain from Con)						
20 Mar	MORI	The Sunday Times	31%	54%	6%	2%	23
12 Mar	NOP	The Independent	33%	51%	6%	3%	18
10 Mar	ICM	The Guardian	31%	52%	5%	4%	21
26 Feb	Gallup	The Daily Telegraph	31%	49.5%	7%	3.5%	18.5
26 Feb	Audience Selection	N/A	34%	46%	7%	3%	12
24 Feb	ICM	N/A	33%	52%	6%	3%	19
22 Feb	Harris	The Observer	36%	48%	8%	2%	12
19 Feb	MORI	The Sunday Times	34%	51%	5%	4%	17
12 Feb	NOP	The Independent	36%	48%	6%	3%	12
10 Feb	ICM	The Guardian	36%	51%	5%	3%	15
29 Jan	Gallup	The Daily Telegraph	32.5%	48%	8%	3%	15.5
29 Jan	Audience Selection	N/A	38%	47%	5%	4%	9
27 Jan	ICM	N/A	37%	48%	4%	3%	11
25 Jan	Harris	The Observer	36%	49%	6%	2%	13
22 Jan	MORI	The Sunday Times	36%	48%	5%	3%	12
18 Jan	Harris	The Observer	37%	48%	6%	3%	11
15 Jan	NOP	The Independent	40%	44%	7%	–	4
13 Jan	ICM	The Guardian	38%	47%	5%	3%	9
8 Jan	Gallup	The Daily Telegraph	35%	45.5%	7.5%	3.5%	10.5

=== 1989 ===
Survey end date	Pollster	Client	Con	Lab	LD	SDP	Lead
28 Dec	MORI	The Sunday Times	39%	46%	6%	3%	7
18 Dec	Audience Selection	N/A	40%	42%	6%	4%	2
17 Dec	ICM	The Sunday Correspondent	38%	49%	4%	3%	11
14 Dec	Harris	The Observer	39%	46%	6%	1%	7
8 Dec	ICM	The Guardian	37%	49%	4%	3%	12
4 Dec	NOP	N/A	38%	45%	7%	–	7
4 Dec	Gallup	The Daily Telegraph	37.5%	43.5%	9%	3%	6
27 Nov	MORI	N/A	42%	46%	5%	3%	4
27 Nov	Audience Selection	N/A	37%	44%	4%	3%	7
26 Nov	MORI	The Sunday Times	37%	51%	4%	3%	14
25 Nov	ICM	The Sunday Correspondent	38%	48%	3%	4%	10
23 Nov	Harris	The Observer	36%	47%	9%	1%	11
13 Nov	NOP	N/A	34%	46%	9%	–	12
11 Nov	ICM	The Guardian	36%	49%	6%	3%	13
Oct	The Social and Liberal Democrats change their name to the Liberal Democrats						
31 Oct	Harris	BBC	37%	50%	6%	2%	13
30 Oct	Audience Selection	N/A	33%	50%	4%	2%	17
30 Oct	Gallup	The Daily Telegraph	35%	44%	8%	2.5%	9
29 Oct	MORI	The Sunday Times	39%	46%	0%	–	7
28 Oct	NOP	The Mail on Sunday	41%	47%	6%	–	6
23 Oct	MORI	The Sunday Times	38%	48%	5%	3%	10
21 Oct	ICM	The Sunday Correspondent	35%	50%	4%	3%	15
19 Oct	Harris	The Observer	38%	48%	6%	1%	10
9 Oct	Gallup	The Daily Telegraph	38%	47.5%	4.5%	2.5%	9.5
7 Oct	ICM	The Guardian	39%	49%	4%	2%	10
5 Oct	Harris	The Observer	38%	49%	5%	2%	11
4 Oct	NOP	Evening Standard	37%	46%	5%	–	9
3 Oct	ICM	Press Association	37%	45%	4%	3%	8
3 Oct	Audience Selection	N/A	37%	39%	6%	3%	2
2 Oct	Gallup	The Daily Telegraph	35%	41.5%	8.5%	5%	6.5
28 Sep	Harris	The Observer	38%	45%	5%	3%	7
26 Sep	MORI	The Sunday Times	38%	43%	6%	3%	5
25 Sep	Gallup	The Sunday Telegraph	36.5%	42%	7.5%	2%	5.5
25 Sep	NOP	The Mail on Sunday	34%	46%	7%	–	12
23 Sep	ICM	The Sunday Correspondent	39%	45%	4%	2%	6
20 Sep	Harris	The Observer	39%	42%	6%	3%	3
14 Sep	Harris	The Observer	37%	45%	6%	3%	8
9 Sep	ICM	The Guardian	36%	46%	7%	4%	10
4 Sep	Gallup	The Daily Telegraph	36.5%	43%	6.5%	3%	6.5
4 Sep	NOP	The Independent	38%	40%	8%	2%	4
28 Aug	Audience Selection	N/A	37%	42%	5%	4%	5
26 Aug	ICM	The Sunday Correspondent	38%	46%	6%	3%	8
24 Aug	Harris	The Observer	37%	45%	7%	2%	8
21 Aug	NOP	N/A	40%	41%	7%	1%	1
21 Aug	MORI	The Sunday Times	40%	45%	4%	3%	5
12 Aug	ICM	The Guardian	36%	44%	6%	3%	8
31 Jul	Audience Selection	N/A	38%	41%	4%	5%	3
26 Jul	MORI	The Sunday Times	36%	45%	4%	4%	9
20 Jul	Harris	The Observer	37%	44%	6%	3%	7
10 Jul	NOP	N/A	36%	42%	7%	2%	6
8 Jul	ICM	The Guardian	38%	42%	5%	4%	4
7 Jul	Gallup	The Daily Telegraph	34%	44.5%	5.5%	4.5%	10.5
3 Jul	Gallup	The Daily Telegraph	34%	47%	6%	3.5%	13
3 Jul	Audience Selection	N/A	35%	43%	4%	3%	8
27 Jun	MORI	The Sunday Times	37%	47%	4%	3%	10
22 Jun	Harris	The Observer	34%	48%	6%	2%	14
15 Jun	European Parliament election; Glasgow Central by-election and Vauxhall by-election (both Lab holds)						
12 Jun	NOP	N/A	40%	42%	8%	4%	2
10 Jun	ICM	The Guardian	38%	42%	8%	4%	4
10 Jun	MORI	The Times	39%	44%	7%	4%	5
5 Jun	Gallup	The Daily Telegraph	36.5%	43.5%	8%	3%	7
29 May	Audience Selection	N/A	41%	45%	6%	4%	4
23 May	Harris	The Observer	46%	41%	7%	2%	5
22 May	NOP	N/A	42%	41%	8%	3%	1
22 May	MORI	The Sunday Times	41%	43%	7%	4%	2
17 May	Local elections in Northern Ireland						
13 May	ICM	The Guardian	43%	43%	8%	3%	Tie
4 May	Local elections in England and Wales; Vale of Glamorgan by-election (Lab gain from Con)						
1 May	Gallup	The Daily Telegraph	40.5%	37.5%	10%	7%	3
30 Apr	Audience Selection	N/A	42%	38%	7%	9%	4
24 Apr	NOP	N/A	43%	37%	9%	4%	6
24 Apr	MORI	The Sunday Times	41%	41%	9%	6%	Tie
20 Apr	Harris	The Observer	42%	39%	11%	4%	3
8 Apr	ICM	The Guardian	44%	40%	7%	6%	4
3 Apr	Gallup	The Daily Telegraph	37.5%	40%	10%	8%	2.5
27 Mar	MORI	The Times	43%	39%	8%	6%	4
23 Mar	Harris	The Observer	41%	41%	9%	3%	Tie
20 Mar	NOP	N/A	42%	37%	0%	–	5
19 Mar	MORI	The Sunday Times	41%	40%	9%	6%	1
19 Mar	MORI	The Sunday Times	44%	40%	6%	6%	4
13 Mar	ICM	The Guardian	41%	39%	8%	7%	2
5 Mar	MORI	BBC	41%	37%	9%	4%	4
28 Feb	MORI	N/A	42%	41%	8%	4%	1
28 Feb	MORI	The Sunday Times	42%	39%	9%	7%	3
27 Feb	Audience Selection	N/A	44%	35%	7%	11%	9
27 Feb	Gallup	The Daily Telegraph	37.5%	37.5%	11.5%	8.5%	Tie
23 Feb	Harris	The Observer	41%	42%	10%	3%	1
23 Feb	Pontypridd by-election (Lab hold) and Richmond (Yorks) by-election (Con hold)						
20 Feb	NOP	N/A	41%	37%	11%	4%	4
20 Feb	Gallup	The Sunday Telegraph	39%	39%	11%	5%	Tie
13 Feb	Gallup	The Daily Telegraph	40.5%	39%	11.5%	4.5%	1.5
11 Feb	ICM	The Guardian	42%	39%	7%	7%	3
30 Jan	MORI	The Sunday Times	47%	36%	8%	5%	11
30 Jan	Audience Selection	N/A	44%	39%	8%	5%	5
29 Jan	Harris	BBC	50%	37%	6%	–	13
23 Jan	NOP	N/A	46%	34%	10%	3%	12
19 Jan	Harris	The Observer	47%	37%	10%	4%	10
16 Jan	Gallup	The Daily Telegraph	42.5%	34%	14%	5.5%	8.5
16 Jan	ICM	The Guardian	44%	40%	8%	4%	4
15 Jan	Harris/Channel 4	N/A	44%	41%	10%	–	3

=== 1988 ===
Survey end date	Pollster	Client	Con	Lab	All	SLD	SDP	Lead
31 Dec	Audience Selection	N/A	45%	37%	–	8%	6%	8
29 Dec	MORI	The Sunday Times	46%	36%	–	6%	7%	10
15 Dec	Epping Forest by-election (Con hold)							
12 Dec	Gallup	The Daily Telegraph	43%	32%	–	13%	6.5%	11
6 Dec	Marplan	The Guardian	45%	39%	–	8%	4%	6
2 Dec	NOP	N/A	41%	36%	–	11%	4%	5
30 Nov	MORI	The Sunday Times	45%	37%	–	8%	6%	8
30 Nov	MORI	N/A	44%	39%	–	8%	6%	5
28 Nov	Audience Selection	N/A	40%	39%	–	9%	6%	1
24 Nov	Harris	The Observer	44%	39%	–	9%	3%	5
14 Nov	Gallup	The Daily Telegraph	42.5%	36%	–	12.5%	4.5%	6.5
10 Nov	Glasgow Govan by-election (SNP gain from Lab)							
7 Nov	NOP	N/A	45%	36%	–	10%	4%	9
7 Nov	Marplan	The Guardian	42%	42%	–	8%	5%	Tie
31 Oct	MORI	The Sunday Times	44%	39%	–	8%	6%	5
31 Oct	Audience Selection	N/A	46%	35%	–	7%	6%	11
24 Oct	Gallup	The Daily Telegraph	45.5%	34%	–	12.5%	5%	11.5
20 Oct	Harris	The Observer	49%	40%	–	7%	2%	9
12 Oct	NOP	N/A	46%	36%	–	9%	4%	10
11 Oct	Marplan	N/A	45%	40%	–	8%	2%	5
11 Oct	Marplan	The Guardian	44%	40%	–	7%	5%	4
10 Oct	MORI	N/A	46%	39%	–	8%	4%	7
29 Sep	Harris	TV-AM	48%	36%	–	11%	2%	12
26 Sep	MORI	The Sunday Times	44%	39%	–	8%	6%	5
22 Sep	Harris	The Observer	47%	38%	–	8%	5%	9
14 Sep	Marplan	The Guardian	44%	42%	–	9%	3%	2
14 Sep	NOP	N/A	46%	38%	–	8%	3%	8
12 Sep	Audience Selection	N/A	42%	40%	–	8%	6%	2
12 Sep	Gallup	The Daily Telegraph	43%	36.5%	–	12.5%	5%	6.5
22 Aug	MORI	The Sunday Times	50%	36%	–	8%	4%	14
15 Aug	Gallup	The Daily Telegraph	45.5%	33.5%	–	10.5%	6.5%	12.5
9 Aug	Marplan	The Guardian	45%	41%	–	7%	4%	4
29 Jul	Paddy Ashdown is elected leader of the Social and Liberal Democrats							
25 Jul	NOP	N/A	46%	36%	–	10%	4%	10
25 Jul	MORI	The Sunday Times	46%	41%	–	8%	4%	5
21 Jul	Harris	The Observer	46%	41%	–	9%	3%	5
18 Jul	Gallup	The Daily Telegraph	41.5%	39%	–	9%	7%	2.5
14 Jul	Kensington by-election (Con hold)							
12 Jul	Marplan	The Guardian	45%	43%	–	6%	4%	2
11 Jul	MORI	N/A	48%	38%	–	7%	5%	10
3 Jul	Harris	TV-AM	47%	38%	–	9%	3%	9
28 Jun	MORI	The Sunday Times	48%	38%	–	7%	5%	10
28 Jun	Audience Selection	N/A	45%	38%	–	8%	5%	7
27 Jun	NOP	N/A	49%	34%	–	10%	4%	15
23 Jun	Harris	The Observer	48%	36%	–	9%	3%	12
13 Jun	Gallup	The Daily Telegraph	42%	43%	–	7%	4%	1
11 Jun	MORI	N/A	47%	40%	–	7%	4%	7
7 Jun	Marplan	The Guardian	47%	42%	–	5%	3%	5
4 Jun	Harris	TV-AM	43%	40%	–	12%	2%	3
1 Jun	MORI	The Sunday Times	44%	40%	–	7%	6%	4
29 May	Audience Selection	N/A	40%	43%	–	6%	8%	3
23 May	NOP	N/A	47%	37%	–	8%	4%	10
19 May	Harris	The Observer	44%	41%	–	10%	2%	3
16 May	Gallup	The Daily Telegraph	45%	36%	–	8.5%	6%	9
10 May	Marplan	The Guardian	44%	42%	–	7%	4%	1
5 May	Local elections in England and Scotland							
2 May	Harris	TV-AM	43%	38%	–	11%	–	5
26 Apr	MORI	The Sunday Times	44%	42%	–	6%	5%	1
21 Apr	Harris	The Observer	44%	39%	–	10%	5%	5
18 Apr	Gallup	The Daily Telegraph	40.5%	41.5%	–	11%	4%	1
12 Apr	Marplan	The Guardian	43%	42%	–	8%	5%	1
11 Apr	NOP	N/A	45%	36%	–	15%	–	9
28 Mar	MORI	The Sunday Times	46%	37%	–	8%	6%	9
24 Mar	Harris	The Observer	46%	39%	–	11%	1%	7
21 Mar	Gallup	The Daily Telegraph	42%	36.5%	–	13%	6.5%	5.5
20 Mar	MORI	N/A	46%	39%	–	6%	7%	7
13 Mar	Audience Selection	N/A	45%	40%	–	11%	–	5
8 Mar	Marplan	The Guardian	43%	42%	–	14%	–	1
3 Mar	The Liberal Party and the SDP merge to form the Social and Liberal Democrats							
3 Mar	Harris	The Observer	47%	36%	12%	–	2%	11
1 Mar	MORI	The Sunday Times	46%	38%	14%	–	–	8
29 Feb	Harris	N/A	44%	43%	12%	–	–	1
15 Feb	Gallup	The Daily Telegraph	46%	36%	15%	–	–	10
14 Feb	Audience Selection	N/A	45%	41%	11%	–	–	4
9 Feb	Marplan	The Guardian	45%	41%	8%	–	4%	4
8 Feb	NOP	N/A	45%	37%	14%	–	–	8
26 Jan	MORI	The Sunday Times	50%	36%	12%	–	–	14
18 Jan	Gallup	The Daily Telegraph	45.5%	37%	15%	–	–	7.5
11 Jan	NOP	N/A	47%	35%	16%	–	–	12
11 Jan	Marplan	The Guardian	42%	40%	17%	–	–	2

=== 1987 ===
Survey end date	Pollster	Client	Con	Lab	All	Lead
30 Dec	MORI	The Sunday Times	48%	36%	15%	12
14 Dec	NOP	N/A	47%	35%	15%	12
8 Dec	Marplan	The Guardian	47%	37%	13%	10
7 Dec	Gallup	The Daily Telegraph	46.5%	34.5%	16%	12
30 Nov	NOP	N/A	49%	34%	15%	15
25 Nov	MORI	The Sunday Times	50%	38%	11%	12
16 Nov	Gallup	The Daily Telegraph	46.5%	33%	17%	13.5
3 Nov	NOP	N/A	45%	36%	15%	9
26 Oct	MORI	The Sunday Times	47%	37%	14%	10
19 Oct	Gallup	The Daily Telegraph	52%	31.5%	13.5%	20.5
19 Oct	MORI	N/A	50%	34%	14%	16
13 Oct	Marplan	The Guardian	45%	39%	13%	6
30 Sep	MORI	The Sunday Times	49%	36%	12%	13
28 Sep	NOP	N/A	50%	34%	13%	16
21 Sep	Gallup	The Sunday Telegraph	48%	35.5%	14%	12.5
20 Sep	Harris	The Observer	47%	35%	16%	12
7 Sep	Gallup	The Daily Telegraph	44%	33%	20%	11
3 Sep	NOP	N/A	49%	33%	16%	16
26 Aug	MORI	The Sunday Times	48%	36%	14%	12
24 Aug	NOP	N/A	48%	33%	17%	15
17 Aug	Gallup	The Daily Telegraph	45.5%	35.5%	17.5%	10
28 Jul	MORI	The Sunday Times	49%	33%	17%	16
16 Jul	Harris	The Observer	48%	33%	17%	15
13 Jul	Gallup	The Daily Telegraph	44.5%	33%	20.5%	11.5
2 Jul	Harris	TV-AM	42%	36%	20%	6
1 Jul	MORI	The Sunday Times	49%	31%	17%	18
29 Jun	NOP	N/A	42%	33%	23%	9
11 Jun 1987	1987 general election		43.3%	31.5%	23.1%	11.8

== Individual constituency poll results ==
=== Langbaurgh ===
Date(s) conducted	Pollster	Client	Sample size	Con	Lab	Lib	LD	Others	Lead
9 Apr 1992	1992 general election		–	45.4%	43.1%	–	11.5%	–	2.3
7 Nov 1991	1991 by-election		–	39.1%	42.9%	–	16.1%	0.9%	3.8
31 Oct – 3 Nov 1991	NOP	N/A	Unknown	38%	49%	–	11%	–	11
11 Jun 1987	1987 general election		–	41.7%	38.4%	19.9%	–	–	3.3

=== Liverpool Walton ===
Date(s) conducted	Pollster	Client	Sample size	Lab	Lib	Con	LD	WRL	Others	Lead
9 Apr 1992	1992 general election		–	72.4%	–	12.5%	12.0%	–	3.0%	59.9
4 Jul 1991	1991 by-election		–	53.1%	–	2.9%	36.0%	6.5%	1.5%	17.1
27–30 Jun 1991	NOP	Granada	Unknown	64%	–	4%	23%	9%	–	41
11 Jun 1987	1987 general election		–	64.4%	21.2%	14.4%	–	–	–	43.2

=== Monmouth ===
Date(s) conducted	Pollster	Client	Sample size	Con	Lab	SDP	PC–Grn (Note: Candidate Melvin Witherden ran on a Green Party–Plaid Cymru split ticket in 1991 and 1992.)		LD	Others	Lead
9 Apr 1992	1992 general election		–	47.3%	41.0%	–	0.8%		10.9%	–	6.3
16 May 1991	1991 by-election		–	34.0%	39.3%	–	0.6%		24.8%	1.4%	5.3
9–12 May 1991	NOP	HTV	Unknown	33%	41%	–	1%		24%	–	8
11 Jun 1987	1987 general election		–	47.5%	27.7%	24.0%	0.8%	–	–	–	19.8

=== Neath ===
Date(s) conducted	Pollster	Client	Sample size	Lab	Con	SDP	PC	LD	SDP (Note: This iteration of the Social Democratic Party (formed 1990) is different from the original party which was part of the SDP–Liberal Alliance and stood in the seat in 1987, and the SDP which broke away from the formal merger with the Liberal Party into the Liberal Democrats in 1988, and was dissolved in 1990.)	Others	Lead
9 Apr 1992	1992 general election		–	68.0%	15.2%	–	11.3%	5.4%	–	–	52.8
4 Apr 1991	1991 by-election		–	51.7%	8.6%	–	23.3%	5.8%	5.3%	5.1%	28.4
28–31 Mar 1991	NOP	HTV	Unknown	65%	9%	–	13%	6%	4%	–	52
11 Jun 1987	1987 general election		–	63.4%	16.1%	14.1%	6.4%	–	–	–	47.3

=== Pontypridd ===
Date(s) conducted	Pollster	Client	Sample size	Lab	Con	SDP	PC	LD/SLD	SDP (Note: This is the breakway successor party of the original Social Democratic Party (UK) who stood in the seat in 1987, formed in 1988 by those who opposed its merger with the Liberal Party into the Liberal Democrats.)	Others	Lead
9 Apr 1992	1992 general election		–	60.8%	20.3%	–	9.1%	8.5%	–	1.3%	40.5
23 Feb 1989	1989 by-election		–	53.4%	13.5%	–	25.3%	3.9%	3.1%	0.7%	28.1
18–19 Feb 1989	NOP	HTV	Unknown	60%	14%	–	18%	4%	4%	–	42
6–9 Feb 1989	NOP	HTV	Unknown	65%	15%	–	12%	4%	4%	–	50
11 Jun 1987	1987 general election		–	56.3%	19.5%	18.9%	5.3%	–	–	–	36.8

=== Ribble Valley ===
Date(s) conducted	Pollster	Client	Sample size	Con	SDP	Lab	LD	Others	Lead
9 Apr 1992	1992 general election		–	52.4%	–	6.5%	40.6%	0.5%	11.8
7 Mar 1991	1991 by-election		–	38.5%	–	9.5%	48.5%	3.5%	10.0
3–4 Mar 1991	NOP	The Independent	Unknown	45%	–	19%	34%	1% Grn 1%	11
11 Jun 1987	1987 general election		–	60.9%	21.4%	17.7%	–	–	39.5

=== Vale of Glamorgan ===
Date(s) conducted	Pollster	Client	Sample size	Con	Lab	SDP	PC	LD/SLD	SDP	Grn	Others	Lead
9 Apr 1992	1992 general election		–	44.3%	44.3%	–	2.1%	9.2%	–	–	–	0.03
4 May 1989	1989 by-election		–	36.3%	48.9%	–	3.5%	4.2%	2.3%	2.0%	2.8%	12.6
30 Apr – 1 May 1989	NOP	HTV	Unknown	39%	48%	–	3%	4%	3%	–	–	9
17–20 Apr 1989	NOP	HTV	Unknown	41%	45%	–	4%	3%	3%	–	–	4
11 Jun 1987	1987 general election		–	46.8%	34.7%	16.7%	1.8%	–	–	–	–	12.1
