= 1999 Epping Forest District Council election =

1999 UK local government election

← 1998	6 May 1999	2000 →

20 seats to Epping Forest District Council 29 seats needed for a majority
- Turnout: 29.0% ▼0.4%

	First party	Second party	Third party
Party	Conservative	Liberal Democrats	Labour
Last election	14 seats, 36.7%	15 seats, 20.1%	18 seats, 29.6%
Seats before	16	14	17
Seats won	18	16	14
Seat change	▲4	▲1	▼4
Popular vote	8,173	4,818	5,060
Percentage	42.7%	25.1%	26.4%
Swing	▲6.0%	▲5.0%	▼3.2%
	Fourth party	Fifth party	Sixth party
Party	Loughton Residents	Independent	Epping Residents
Last election	7 seats, 9.0%	3 seats, N/A	1 seat, 1.6%
Seats before	7	3	1
Seats won	7	3	0
Seat change	Steady	Steady	▼1
Popular vote	503	607	N/A
Percentage	2.6%	3.2%	N/A
Swing	▼13.2%	N/A	N/A
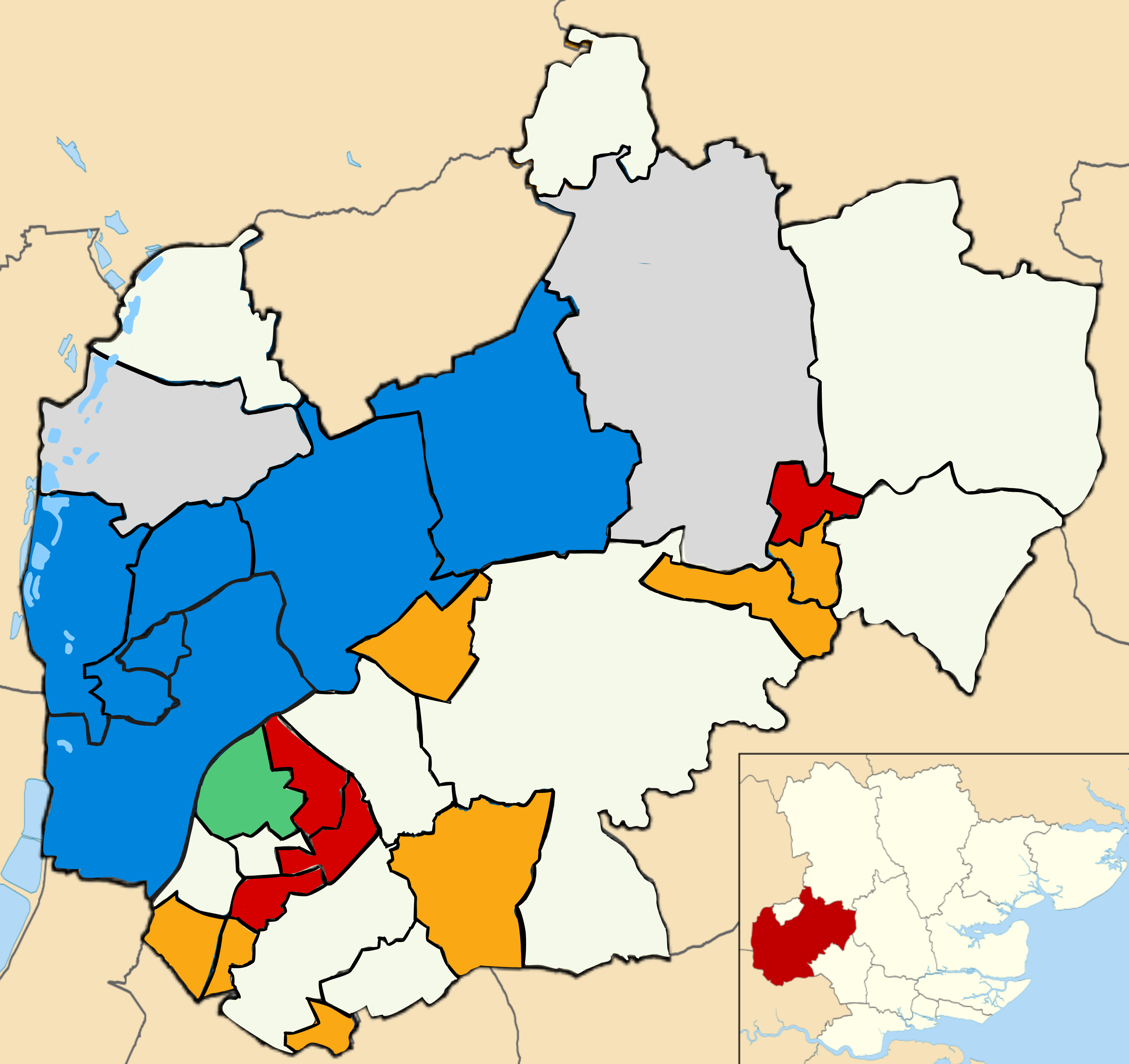
- Winner of each seat at the 1999 Epping Forest District Council election
Council control before election
No overall control
Labour largest party
Council control after election
No overall control
Labour largest party

Elections to Epping Forest Council were held on 6 May 1999. One third of the council was up for election and the council stayed under no overall control. Overall turnout was 29%. This was the last time the Epping Residents Association had representation on the district council.

== Background ==
The 1999 Epping Forest District Council election would prove to be a turning point in Epping Forest’s political history. Labour, which had steadily grown its strength during the 1990s, remained the largest party on the council in 1999 — the last time it would ever do so. The party’s national popularity under Tony Blair had filtered down into district politics, giving Labour unprecedented prominence in a council traditionally dominated by Conservatives and local resident groups. However, warning signs for Labour’s long-term position were already present. The party lost all three Waltham Abbey seats it had been defending, foreshadowing its future decline in the district. By 2011, Labour would hold no seats on the council, ending a once significant local presence.

For the Conservatives, the 1999 results offered modest reassurance after a difficult decade. Though still some way from their former dominance, they made inroads in traditional strongholds, particularly in Waltham Abbey, where Labour’s losses provided an opening. Meanwhile, the Liberal Democrats maintained a steady base, continuing to perform well in areas such as Buckhurst Hill and parts of Loughton, while the various residents’ associations retained their footholds, reflecting the district’s distinctive pattern of localist politics.

The 1999 election, therefore, stands as both a high-water mark and the beginning of a long decline for Labour in Epping Forest, as the council chamber would gradually revert to competition between Conservatives, Liberal Democrats, and local independents in the decades that followed.

== By-elections ==
=== Waltham Abbey East by-election ===
Waltham Abbey East By-Election 22 October 1998
Party	Candidate	Votes	%	±%
Conservative	Michael Dickins	633	60.2	▲8.6
Labour		336	31.9	▼9.9
Liberal Democrats		83	7.9	▲1.3
Majority		297	28.3	N/A
Turnout		1,052	18.2	▼8.7
Conservative gain from Labour		Swing		

=== Sheering by-election ===
Councillor Yeo who previously represented Sheering died in early 1999 prompting a by-election which was subsequently won by the Conservatives' John Harrington who completed Yeo's term until being elected to a full term in 2000.

Sheering by-election 25 February 1999
Party	Candidate	Votes	%	±%
Conservative	John Harrington	371	50.9	▲23.3
Liberal Democrats		276	37.9	▼10.4
Labour		82	11.2	▼13.0
Majority		95	13.0	N/A
Turnout		729	32.9	▼1.5
Conservative gain from Liberal Democrats		Swing		

== Summary ==
1996 Epping Forest District Council election
Party	This election			Full council			This election		
Party	Seats	Net	Seats %	Other	Total	Total %	Votes	Votes %	+/−
Conservative	6	▲4	31.5	12	18	30.5	8,173	42.7	▲6.0
Liberal Democrats	7	▲1	36.8	9	16	27.1	4,818	25.9	▲5.0
Labour	4	▼4	13.7	9	14	28.8	5,060	26.4	▼3.2
Loughton Residents	1	Steady	5.2	6	7	11.8	503	2.6	▼13.2
Independent	2	Steady	10.4	2	3	6.7	607	3.2	N/A
Chigwell Residents	0	Steady	0.0	1	1	1.6	N/A	N/A	N/A
Epping Residents	0	▼1	0.0	0	0	0.0	N/A	N/A	N/A

== Ward results ==
=== Buckhurst Hill East ===
Buckhurst Hill East
Party	Candidate	Votes	%	±%
Liberal Democrats	Malcolm Woollard	580	64.8	▲0.6
Conservative	George Denny	207	23.1	▲0.5
Labour	Lynn Baddock	108	12.1	▼1.1
Majority		373	41.7	▲0.1
Turnout		895	26.1	▼5.8
Liberal Democrats hold		Swing		

=== Buckhurst Hill West ===
Buckhurst Hill West
Party	Candidate	Votes	%	±%
Liberal Democrats	Michael Heavens	889	53.0	▼6.6
Conservative	Richard Watts	713	42.5	▲8.5
Labour	Janice Croke	74	4.4	▼2.0
Majority		176	10.5	▼15.1
Turnout		1,676	32.7	▲0.2
Liberal Democrats hold		Swing		

=== Chipping Ongar ===
Chipping Ongar
Party	Candidate	Votes	%	±%
Liberal Democrats	Keith Wright	290	50.0	▲7.2
Conservative	Frank Love	212	36.6	▲6.9
Labour	Sheila Spring	78	13.4	▼12.4
Majority		78	13.4	▲0.3
Turnout		580	44.3	▲31.2
Liberal Democrats hold		Swing		

=== Debden Green ===
Debden Green
Party	Candidate	Votes	%	±%
Labour	Gillian Huckle	635	75.5	▼0.6
Conservative	Derek Knight	206	24.5	▲0.6
Majority		429	51.0	▼1.2
Turnout		841	21.1	▼2.8
Labour hold		Swing		

=== Epping Hemnall ===
Epping Hemnall
Party	Candidate	Votes	%	±%
Liberal Democrats	Jonathan Whitehouse	968	50.1	▼9.2
Conservative	Diana Collins	784	40.6	▲11.2
Labour	Vivien Cave	181	9.4	▼1.9
Majority		184	9.5	▼20.4
Turnout		1,933	40.7	▲5.6
Liberal Democrats gain from Conservative		Swing		

=== Epping Lindsey ===
Epping Lindsey
Party	Candidate	Votes	%	±%
Conservative	Penny Smith	704	49.4	▲13.1
Labour	Barry Johns	435	30.5	▲3.6
Liberal Democrats	Joanne Whitehouse	287	20.1	▲8.4
Majority		269	18.9	▲9.5
Turnout		1,426	30.2	▲0.8
Conservative gain from Epping Residents Association		Swing		

=== Grange Hill ===
Grange Hill
Party	Candidate	Votes	%	±%
Liberal Democrats	Peter Spencer	638	54.9	▲6.3
Conservative	Hilary Wood	422	36.3	▼15.1
Labour	Ronald Rodwell	102	8.8	▲8.8
Majority		216	18.6	
Turnout		1,162	26.0	▼1.1
Liberal Democrats hold		Swing		

=== Greensted and Marden Ash ===
Greensted and Marden Ash
Party	Candidate	Votes	%	±%
Liberal Democrats	Derek Jacobs	393	53.8	▼8.8
Conservative	Nicola Deller	172	23.5	▲4.9
Labour	Robert MacDonald	166	22.7	▲4.1
Majority		221	30.3	▼13.5
Turnout		731	39.8	▲3.3
Liberal Democrats hold		Swing		

=== High Beech ===
High Beech
Party	Candidate	Votes	%	±%
Conservative	Norma Green	578	78.6	▲21.6
Labour	Sidney Miller	102	13.9	▼10.8
Liberal Democrats	Lucille Thompson	55	7.5	▼10.8
Majority		476	64.7	▲32.4
Turnout		735	34.2	▲9.2
Conservative hold		Swing		

=== Lambourne ===
Lambourne
Party	Candidate	Votes	%	±%
Liberal Democrats	Kenneth Easlea	357	54.0	▼7.5
Conservative	Stephen Metcalfe	304	46.0	▲20.4
Majority		53	8.0	▼27.6
Turnout		661	37.8	▼21.2
Liberal Democrats hold		Swing		

=== Loughton Broadway ===
Loughton Broadway
Party	Candidate	Votes	%	±%
Labour	Joan Davis	703	77.6	▼1.3
Conservative	Lorne Daniel	203	22.4	▲1.3
Majority		500	55.2	▼2.6
Turnout		906	22.3	▼4.3
Labour hold		Swing		

=== Loughton Roding ===
Loughton Roding
Party	Candidate	Votes	%	±%
Labour	Maureen Boatman	629	61.2	▼8.7
Conservative	Norma Pearce	300	29.2	▲18.4
Liberal Democrats	Peter Netherclift	99	9.6	▲5.0
Majority		329	32.0	▼23.2
Turnout		1,028	24.6	▼8.8
Labour hold		Swing		

=== Loughton St. John's ===
Loughton St John's
Party	Candidate	Votes	%	±%
Loughton Residents	Brian Moore	503	53.6	▼0.3
Conservative	Ian Locks	309	32.9	▲8.6
Labour	Thomas Owen	126	13.4	▼8.3
Majority		194	20.7	▼8.9
Turnout		938	22.5	▼5.0
Loughton Residents hold		Swing		

=== Moreton and Matching ===
Moreton and Matching
Party	Candidate	Votes	%	±%
Independent	Richard Morgan	Unopposed		
Majority		N/A	100%	▲24.6
Turnout		N/A	N/A	N/A
Independent hold		Swing		

=== Nazeing ===
Nazeing
Party	Candidate	Votes	%	±%
Independent	John Carr	607	70.3	N/A
Conservative	Michael Alldis	256	29.7	▼34.2
Majority		351	40.6	▲14.1
Turnout		863	23.5	▼3.0
Independent hold		Swing		

=== North Weald Bassett ===
North Weald Bassett
Party	Candidate	Votes	%	±%
Conservative	Dave Stallan	816	65.5	▲1.1
Labour	Derek Clark	337	27.0	▼8.6
Liberal Democrats	Monica Richardson	93	7.5	▲7.5
Majority		479	38.5	▲9.7
Turnout		1,246	27.7	▲0.9
Conservative hold		Swing		

=== Shelley ===
Shelley
Party	Candidate	Votes	%	±%
Labour	Ronald Barnes	261	79.6	▼8.2
Conservative	Jeremy Dean	67	20.4	▲8.2
Majority		194	59.2	▲14.8
Turnout		328	23.8	▼12.5
Labour hold		Swing		

=== Waltham Abbey East ===
Waltham Abbey East
Party	Candidate	Votes	%	±%
Conservative	Michael Dickins	791	60.8	▲9.2
Labour	Stanley Riley	405	31.1	▼10.7
Liberal Democrats	Ingrid Black	106	8.1	▲1.5
Majority		386	29.7	▲19.9
Turnout		1,302	22.8	▼4.1
Conservative gain from Labour		Swing		

=== Waltham Abbey Paternoster ===
Waltham Abbey Paternoster
Party	Candidate	Votes	%	±%
Conservative	Reginald Chidley	561	63.5	▲26.5
Labour	Fitzherbert Harewood	283	32.0	▼26.2
Liberal Democrats	Olive Dunseath	40	4.5	▼0.3
Majority		278	31.5	▲19.1
Turnout		884	25.9	▲4.7
Conservative gain from Labour		Swing		

=== Waltham Abbey West ===
Waltham Abbey West
Party	Candidate	Votes	%	±%
Conservative	Harold Taylor	515	50.2	▲11.4
Labour	John Langer	435	42.4	▼10.7
Liberal Democrats	Susan Hutchings	76	7.4	▼0.7
Majority		80	7.8	
Turnout		1,026	24.9	▼0.8
Conservative gain from Labour		Swing		
