= 1998 Epping Forest District Council election =

1998 UK local government election

- 7 May 1998

19 seats to Epping Forest District Council 29 seats needed for a majority
- Turnout: 29.4%
	First party	Second party	Third party
Party	Labour	Conservative	Liberal Democrats
Last election	18 seats	15 seats	15 seats
Seats won	17	16	15
Seat change	▼1	▲1	Steady
Popular vote	6,548	8,102	4,449
Percentage	29.6%	36.7%	20.1%
	Fourth party	Fifth party	Sixth party
Party	Loughton Residents	Chigwell Residents	Epping Residents
Last election	7 seats	0 seats	2 seats
Seats won	7	1	1
Seat change	Steady	▲1	▼1
Popular vote	1,988	660	354
Percentage	9.0%	3.0%	1.6%
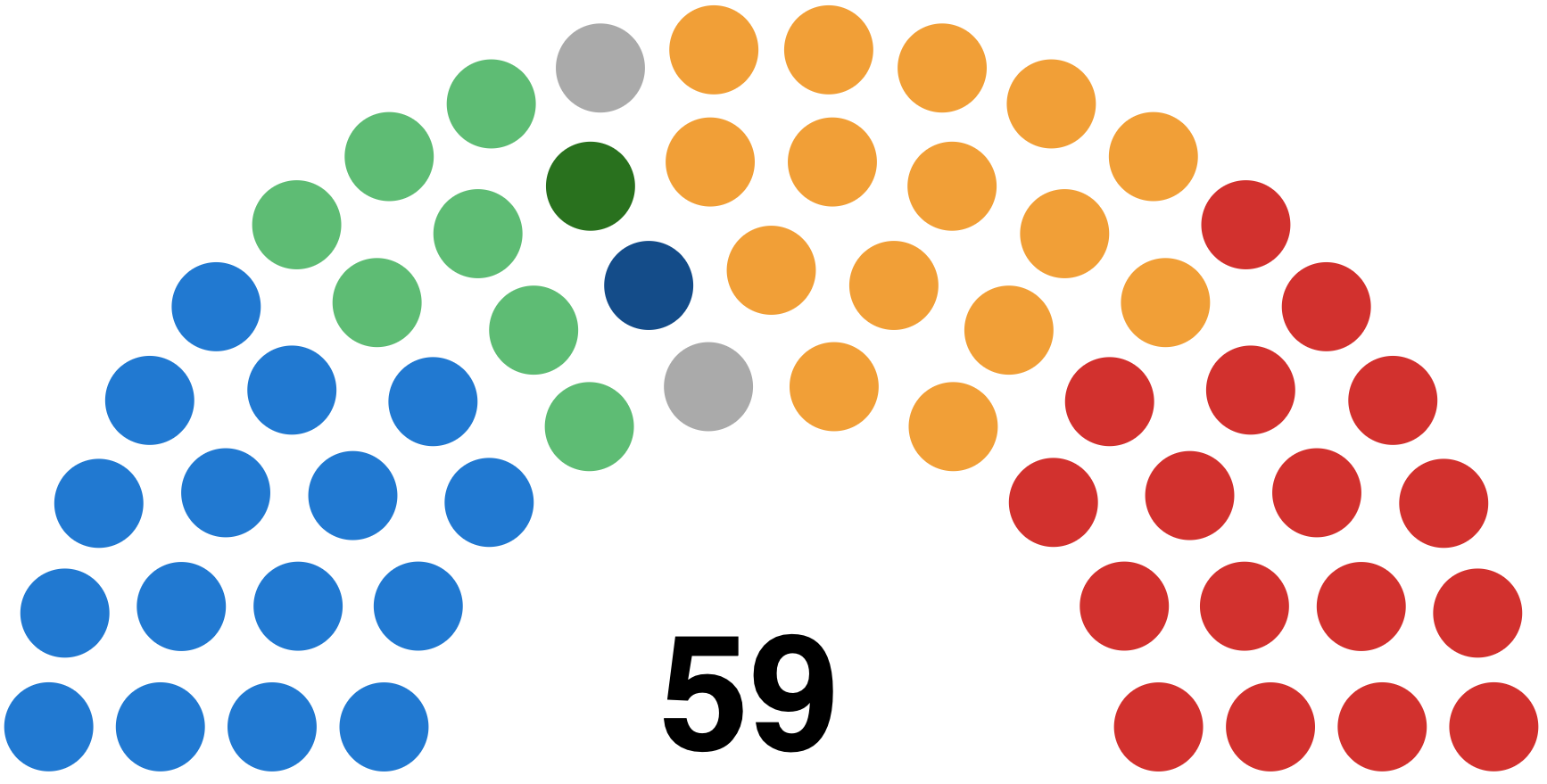
- Council composition following the election
Council control before election
No overall control
Labour largest party
Council control after election
No overall control
Labour largest party

Elections to Epping Forest Council were held on 7 May 1998. One third of the council was up for election and the council stayed under no overall control. Overall turnout was 29.4%.

This election marks the last time the Labour Party were the largest party on the council. By 2015, they would have no representation in the council chamber.

== Ward results ==
=== Buckhurst Hill East ===
Buckhurst Hill East
Party	Candidate	Votes	%	±%
Liberal Democrats	Colin Robinson	687	64.2	▼2.6
Conservative	Ronald Braybrook	242	22.6	▲6.8
Labour	Sidney Miller	141	13.2	▼2.6
Majority		445	41.6	▼7.8
Turnout		1,070	31.9	▼6.5
Liberal Democrats hold		Swing		

=== Buckhurst Hill West ===
Buckhurst Hill West
Party	Candidate	Votes	%	±%
Liberal Democrats	Andrew Thompson	989	59.6	▼0.7
Conservative	James Brokenshire	565	34.0	▲2.8
Labour	Janice Croke	106	6.4	▼2.1
Majority		424	25.6	▼3.5
Turnout		1,660	32.5	▲1.1
Liberal Democrats hold		Swing		

=== Chigwell Row ===
Chigwell Row
Party	Candidate	Votes	%	±%
Liberal Democrats	Patricia Brooks	390	57.9	▲6.8
Conservative	Raymond Warner	283	42.1	▼6.8
Majority		107	15.8	▲13.6
Turnout		673	37.6	▼10.5
Liberal Democrats hold		Swing		

=== Chigwell Village ===
Chigwell Village
Party	Candidate	Votes	%	±%
Chigwell Residents Association	John Knapman	660	62.2	N/A
Conservative	Brian Sandler	338	31.9	▼32.5
Liberal Democrats	Christopher Spence	63	5.9	▼13.9
Majority		322	30.3	▼13.3
Turnout		1,061	31.6	▲3.2
Chigwell Residents Association gain from Conservative				

=== Debden Green ===
Debden Green
Party	Candidate	Votes	%	±%
Labour	Stephen Barnes	705	76.1	▼1.6
Conservative	Lorne Daniel	221	23.9	▲1.6
Majority		484	52.2	▼3.2
Turnout		926	23.9	▼5.3
Labour hold		Swing		

=== Epping Hemnall ===
Epping Hemnall
Party	Candidate	Votes	%	±%
Liberal Democrats	Allan Boydon	998	59.3	▲16.0
Conservative	Jean Ashbridge	494	29.4	▲1.0
Labour	Barry Johns	191	11.3	▼3.3
Majority		504	29.9	▼9.9
Turnout		1,683	35.1	▲20.9
Liberal Democrats hold		Swing		

=== Epping Lindsey ===
Epping Lindsey
Party	Candidate	Votes	%	±%
Conservative	Christopher Whitbread	511	36.3	▲8.3
Labour	Roger Fitz-Gibbon	378	26.9	▼3.0
Epping Residents Association	June O'Brien	354	25.2	▼2.6
Liberal Democrats	Ingrid Black	164	11.7	▼2.2
Majority		133	9.4	▲7.5
Turnout		1,407	29.4	▼2.7
Conservative gain from Epping Residents Association		Swing		

=== Grange Hill ===
Grange Hill
Party	Candidate	Votes	%	±%
Conservative	David Bateman	607	51.4	▲16.1
Liberal Democrats	Evelyn Spong	574	48.6	▼7.1
Majority		33	2.8	▼17.6
Turnout		1,181	27.1	▼6.6
Conservative hold		Swing		

=== Loughton Broadway ===
Loughton Broadway
Party	Candidate	Votes	%	±%
Labour	Paul Bostock	856	78.9	▼4.9
Conservative	Ian Locks	229	21.1	▲4.9
Majority		627	57.8	▼9.7
Turnout		1,085	26.6	▼7.8
Labour hold		Swing		

=== Loughton Forest ===
Loughton Forest
Party	Candidate	Votes	%	±%
Loughton Residents	Leslie Harris	543	50.5	▼18.3
Conservative	Stephen Metcalfe	359	33.4	▲14.2
Labour	Jennifer Hart	142	13.2	▲1.2
Liberal Democrats	Lucille Thompson	31	2.9	N/A
Majority		184	17.1	▼17.6
Turnout		1,075	34.0	▼0.7
Loughton Residents hold		Swing		

=== Loughton Roding ===
Loughton Roding
Party	Candidate	Votes	%	±%
Labour	Stephen Murray	981	69.9	▲2.8
Loughton Residents	Leonard Parsons	207	14.7	N/A
Conservative	Justine Greening	152	10.8	▼9.5
Liberal Democrats	Peter Netherclift	64	4.6	▼8.0
Majority		774	55.2	▲9.5
Turnout		1,404	33.4	▼3.7
Labour hold		Swing		

=== Loughton St. John's ===
Loughton St John's
Party	Candidate	Votes	%	±%
Loughton Residents	Dorothy Paddon	625	53.9	▲3.4
Conservative	Colin Finn	282	24.3	▼7.8
Labour	Lionel Murray	252	21.7	▼0.3
Majority		343	29.6	▲11.2
Turnout		1,159	27.5	▼6.9
Loughton Residents hold		Swing		

=== Loughton St. Mary's ===
Loughton St Mary's
Party	Candidate	Votes	%	±%
Loughton Residents	Ronald Heath	613	59.7	▲1.0
Conservative	Roseanne Serrelli	240	23.4	▲1.4
Labour	Thomas Owen	174	16.9	▼2.4
Majority		373	36.3	▼0.4
Turnout		1,027	30.6	▼1.8
Loughton Residents hold		Swing		

=== Nazeing ===
Nazeing
Party	Candidate	Votes	%	±%
Conservative	Michael Welch	626	63.9	▲40.0
Labour	Desmond Clifton	354	36.1	▲18.7
Majority		272	27.8	▲25.7
Turnout		980	26.5	▼18.5
Conservative hold		Swing		

=== North Weald Bassett ===
North Weald Bassett
Party	Candidate	Votes	%	±%
Conservative	Anne Grigg	780	64.4	▲26.2
Labour	John Childs	431	35.6	▲2.5
Majority		349	28.8	▲26.7
Turnout		1,211	26.8	▼18.2
Conservative hold		Swing		

=== Theydon Bois ===
Theydon Bois
Party	Candidate	Votes	%	±%
Conservative	John Padfield	634	62.9	▲37.0
Liberal Democrats	Monica Richardson	259	25.7	▲15.5
Labour	Ian Standfast	115	11.4	▼8.7
Majority		375	37.2	▲19.2
Turnout		1,008	32.0	▼2.1
Conservative hold		Swing		

=== Waltham Abbey East ===
Waltham Abbey East
Party	Candidate	Votes	%	±%
Conservative	Roy Brownjohn	804	51.6	▲3.9
Labour	John Langer	651	41.8	▼3.1
Liberal Democrats	Susan Hutchings	102	6.6	▼0.8
Majority		153	9.8	▲7.0
Turnout		1,557	26.9	▼7.2
Conservative gain from Labour		Swing		

=== Waltham Abbey Paternoster ===
Waltham Abbey Paternoster
Party	Candidate	Votes	%	±%
Labour	Barckley Sumner	502	58.2	▲2.0
Conservative	Glenn Harper	319	37.0	▼6.7
Liberal Democrats	Anthony Whitehouse	41	4.8	N/A
Majority		183	21.2	▲8.8
Turnout		862	24.8	▼10.8
Labour hold		Swing		

=== Waltham Abbey West ===
Waltham Abbey West
Party	Candidate	Votes	%	±%
Labour	Philip Pennell	569	53.1	▼10.1
Conservative	Harold Taylor	416	38.8	▼2.0
Liberal Democrats	Christopher Whitehouse	87	8.1	N/A
Majority		153	14.3	▼12.8
Turnout		1,072	25.7	▲7.0
Labour hold		Swing		
