= 2000 Epping Forest District Council election =

2000 UK local government election

- 4 May 2000

19 seats to Epping Forest District Council 29 seats needed for a majority
- Turnout: 30.4% ▲1.4%

	First party	Second party	Third party
Party	Conservative	Liberal Democrats	Labour
Last election	18 seats, 42.7%	16 seats, 25.1%	14 seats, 26.4%
Seats before	18	16	14
Seats won	20	16	12
Seat change	▲2	Steady	▼2
Popular vote	8,465	4,751	3,738
Percentage	43.1%	24.2%	19.1%
Swing	▲0.4%	▼0.9%	▼7.3%
	Fourth party	Fifth party
Party	Loughton Residents	Independent
Last election	7 seats, 2.6%	3 seats
Seats before	7	3
Seats won	7	3
Seat change	Steady	Steady
Popular vote	1,751	917
Percentage	8.9%	4.7%
Swing	▲6.3%	N/A
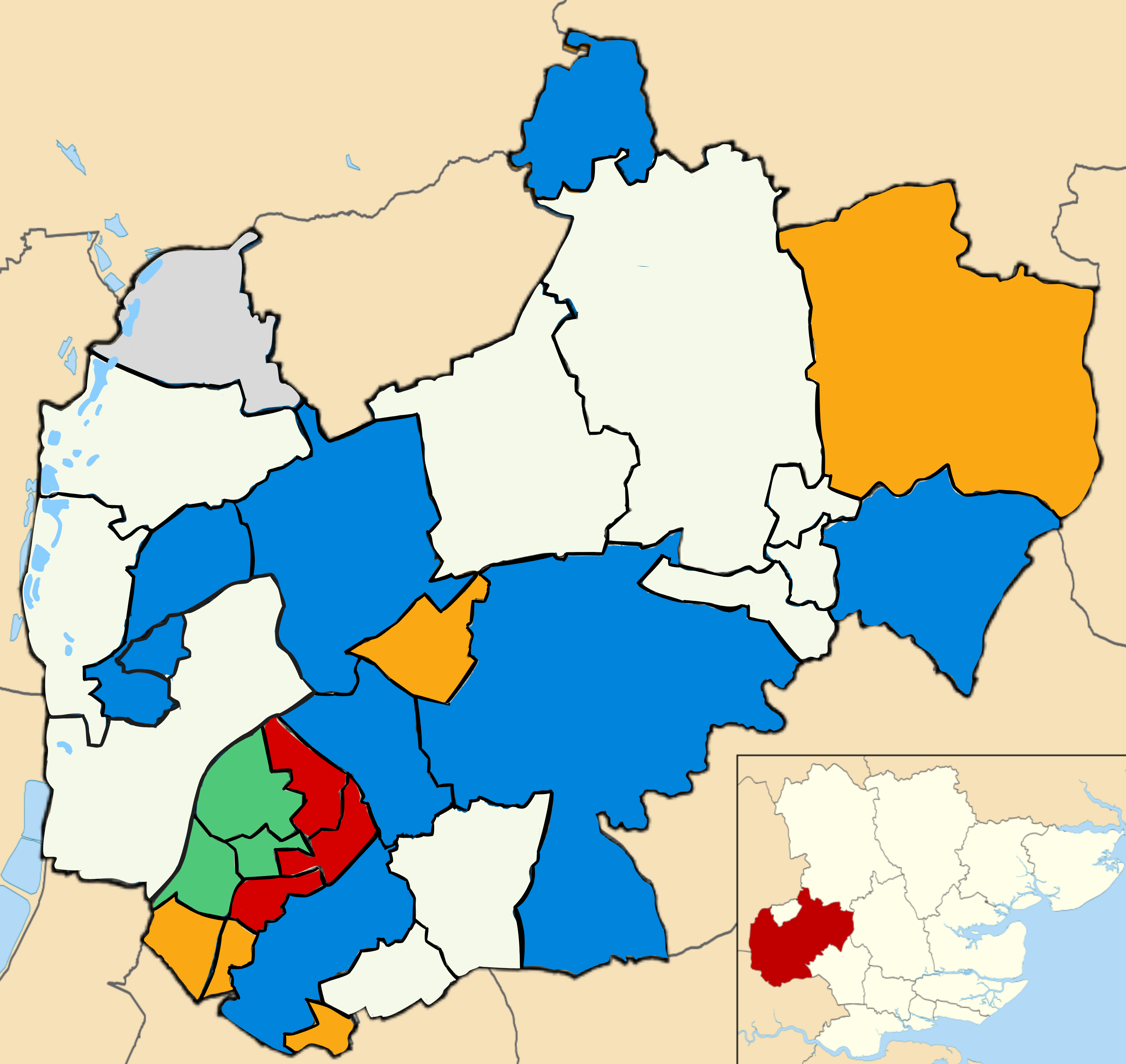
- Winner of each seat at the 2000 Epping Forest District Council election
Council control before election
No overall control
Conservative largest party
Council control after election
No overall control
Conservative largest party

Elections to Epping Forest Council were held on 4 May 2000. One third of the council was up for election and the council stayed under no overall control. Overall turnout was 30.4%. This was the last election with some of the current boundaries.

== By-elections ==
=== Grange Hill by-election ===
Grange Hill By-Election 24 June 1999
Party	Candidate	Votes	%	±%
Liberal Democrats	Eleanor Spencer	621	51.8	▼1.6
Conservative		534	45.0	▲4.6
Labour		43	3.6	▼2.6
Majority		97	6.8	▼6.1
Turnout		1,198		
Liberal Democrats hold		Swing		

=== Debden Green by-election ===
Debden Green By-Election 11 November 1999
Party	Candidate	Votes	%	±%
Labour	Mrs S. Lipscombe	514	68.8	▼6.7
Conservative		138	18.5	▼6.0
Independent		60	8.0	N/A
Liberal Democrats		35	4.7	N/A
Majority		376	50.3	▼2.0
Turnout		747	19.2	▼4.8
Labour hold		Swing		

== Summary ==
1996 Epping Forest District Council election
Party	This election			Full council			This election		
Party	Seats	Net	Seats %	Other	Total	Total %	Votes	Votes %	+/−
Conservative	8	▲2	42.1	12	20	33.8	8,465	43.1	▲0.4
Liberal Democrats	5	Steady	8.4	11	16	27.1	4,751	24.2	▼0.9
Labour	3	▼2	15.7	9	12	20.3	3,738	19.1	▼7.3
Loughton Residents	3	Steady	15.7	4	7	11.8	1,751	8.9	▲6.3
Independent	1	Steady	5.2	2	3	6.7	917	4.7	N/A
Chigwell Residents	0	Steady	0.0	1	1	1.6	N/A	N/A	N/A

== Ward results ==
=== Buckhurst Hill East ===
Buckhurst Hill East
Party	Candidate	Votes	%	±%
Liberal Democrats	Leonard Martin	620	60.0	▼4.8
Conservative	George Denny	301	29.1	▲6.0
Labour	Ronald Rodwell	112	10.8	▼1.3
Majority		319	30.9	▼10.8
Turnout		1,033	31.6	▲5.5
Liberal Democrats hold		Swing		

=== Buckhurst Hill West ===
Buckhurst Hill West
Party	Candidate	Votes	%	±%
Liberal Democrats	Ann Haigh	876	55.0	▲2.0
Conservative	Richard Watts	648	40.7	▼1.8
Labour	Janice Croke	70	4.4	Steady
Majority		228	14.3	▲3.8
Turnout		1,594	32.2	▼0.5
Liberal Democrats hold		Swing		

=== Chigwell Village ===
Chigwell Village
Party	Candidate	Votes	%	±%
Conservative	John Gilliham	564	79.2	▲47.3
Liberal Democrats	Peter Netherclift	148	20.8	▲14.9
Majority		416	58.4	▲28.1
Turnout		712	22.5	▼9.1
Conservative hold		Swing		

=== Debden Green ===
Debden Green
Party	Candidate	Votes	%	±%
Labour	Colin Huckle	485	62.1	▼13.4
Conservative	Derek Knight	296	37.9	▲13.4
Majority		189	24.2	▼26.8
Turnout		781	20.1	▼1.0
Labour hold		Swing		

=== Epping Hemnall ===
Epping Hemnall
Party	Candidate	Votes	%	±%
Liberal Democrats	Janet Whitehouse	862	50.6	▲0.5
Conservative	Ian Hull	704	41.3	▲0.7
Labour	Barry Johns	137	8.0	▼1.4
Majority		158	9.3	▼0.2
Turnout		1,703	37.4	▼3.3
Liberal Democrats hold		Swing		

=== Epping Lindsey ===
Epping Lindsey
Party	Candidate	Votes	%	±%
Conservative	Richard Brady	705	41.8	▼7.6
Liberal Democrats	Robert Goold	558	33.1	▲13.0
Labour	Thomas Norris	422	25.0	▼5.5
Majority		147	8.7	▼10.2
Turnout		1,685	36.3	▲6.1
Conservative gain from Labour		Swing		

=== Grange Hill ===
Grange Hill
Party	Candidate	Votes	%	±%
Liberal Democrats	William Maclaine	740	53.4	▼1.5
Conservative	Ronald McCarthy	561	40.4	▲4.1
Labour	Sidney Miller	86	6.2	▼2.6
Majority		179	13.0	▼5.6
Turnout		1,387	31.8	▲5.8
Liberal Democrats hold		Swing		

=== High Ongar ===
High Ongar
Party	Candidate	Votes	%	±%
Conservative	Maggie McEwen	Unopposed		
Majority		N/A	N/A	N/A
Turnout		N/A	N/A	N/A
Conservative hold		Swing		

=== Loughton Broadway ===
Loughton Broadway
Party	Candidate	Votes	%	±%
Labour	Margaret Owen	498	65.1	▼12.5
Conservative	Ian Locks	267	34.9	▲12.5
Majority		231	30.2	▼25.0
Turnout		765	19.8	▼2.5
Labour hold		Swing		

=== Loughton Forest ===
Loughton Forest
Party	Candidate	Votes	%	±%
Loughton Residents	Ronald Gow	537	51.2	▲0.7
Conservative	Stephen Metcalfe	402	38.4	▲5.0
Labour	Joan Ormston	109	10.4	▼2.8
Majority		135	12.8	▼4.3
Turnout		1,048	33.3	▼0.7
Loughton Residents hold		Swing		

=== Loughton Roding ===
Loughton Roding
Party	Candidate	Votes	%	±%
Labour	Stanley Goodwin	630	54.6	▼6.6
Conservative	Jessica Bostock	375	32.5	▲3.3
Liberal Democrats	Lucille Thompson	148	12.8	▲3.2
Majority		255	22.1	▼9.9
Turnout		1,153	28.8	▲4.2
Labour hold		Swing		

=== Loughton St. John's ===
Loughton St John's
Party	Candidate	Votes	%	±%
Loughton Residents	Roger Pearce	602	53.8	▲0.2
Conservative	Colin Finn	401	35.8	▲2.9
Labour	Thomas Owen	116	10.4	▼3.0
Majority		201	18.0	▼2.7
Turnout		1,119	27.8	▲5.3
Loughton Residents hold		Swing		

=== Loughton St. Mary's ===
Loughton St Mary's
Party	Candidate	Votes	%	±%
Loughton Residents	Michael Wardle	612	61.4	▲1.7
Conservative	John Silberrad	290	29.1	▲5.7
Labour	Peter Lavin	94	9.4	▼7.5
Majority		322	32.3	▼4.0
Turnout		996	31.0	▲0.4
Loughton Residents hold		Swing		

=== Passingford ===
Passingford
Party	Candidate	Votes	%	±%
Conservative	Diana Collins	391	84.6	▼15.4
Liberal Democrats	Susan Hutchings	71	15.4	▲15.4
Majority		320	69.2	▼30.8
Turnout		462	29.7	▲29.7
Conservative hold		Swing		

=== Roothing Country ===
Roothing Country
Party	Candidate	Votes	%	±%
Liberal Democrats	Douglas Kelly	431	66.5	▲25.8
Conservative	William White	217	33.5	▼4.2
Majority		214	33.0	▲30.0
Turnout		648	54.5	▼2.3
Liberal Democrats hold		Swing		

=== Roydon ===
Roydon
Party	Candidate	Votes	%	±%
Independent	Norman Clark	435	82.7	▲36.1
Labour	Robin Walker	91	17.3	N/A
Majority		344	65.4	▲54.9
Turnout		526	25.2	▼22.1
Independent gain from Independent		Swing		

=== Sheering ===
Sheering
Party	Candidate	Votes	%	±%
Conservative	John Harrington	397	76.9	▲49.4
Labour	Jill Finlay	119	23.1	▼1.1
Majority		278	53.8	▲33.0
Turnout		516	23.8	▲3.0
Conservative gain from Liberal Democrats		Swing		

=== Theydon Bois ===
Theydon Bois
Party	Candidate	Votes	%	±%
Conservative	Robert Glozier	591	45.2	▼17.7
Independent	Ronald Smith	482	36.9	N/A
Liberal Democrats	Monica Richardson	165	12.6	▼13.1
Labour	Derek Clark	69	5.3	▼6.1
Majority		109	8.3	▼28.9
Turnout		1,307	42.5	▲10.5
Conservative gain from Independent		Swing		

=== Waltham Abbey East ===
Waltham Abbey East
Party	Candidate	Votes	%	±%
Conservative	Mark Gilding	841	66.0	▲5.2
Labour	John Langer	340	26.7	▼4.4
Liberal Democrats	Ingrid Black	93	7.3	▼0.8
Majority		501	39.3	▲9.6
Turnout		1,274	22.8	Steady
Conservative hold		Swing		

=== Waltham Abbey Paternoster ===
Waltham Abbey Paternoster
Party	Candidate	Votes	%	±%
Conservative	Peter Johnson	514	56.3	▼7.2
Labour	Albert Farren	360	39.4	▲7.4
Liberal Democrats	Olive Dunseath	39	4.3	▼0.2
Majority		154	16.9	▼14.6
Turnout		913	27.3	▲1.4
Conservative gain from Labour		Swing		
