= Uttlesford District Council elections =

Local government elections in Essex, England

Uttlesford District Council is elected every four years.

== Council elections ==
Year	Conservative	Liberal Democrats (Note: Includes totals for the predecessors of the Liberal Democrats, the Liberal Party and SDP (both of which participated in the Alliance).)	Labour	R4U	Independents & Others	Council control after election
Local government reorganisation; council established (42 seats)
1973	22	2	7	–	11	Conservative
New ward boundaries
1976	30	4	3	–	5	Conservative
1979	28	3	4	–	7	Conservative
1983	28	6	1	–	7	Conservative
1987 (Note: District boundary changes took place but the number of seats remained the same.)	24	10	1	–	7	Conservative
1991 (Note: District boundary changes took place but the number of seats remained the same.)	25	10	1	–	6	Conservative
1995 (Note: District boundary changes took place but the number of seats remained the same.)	12	19	4	–	7	No overall control
1999	16	18	2	–	6	No overall control
New ward boundaries; seats increased from 42 to 44
2003	10	31	0	–	3	Liberal Democrats
2007	26	15	0	–	3	Conservative
2011	34	8	0	–	2	Conservative
New ward boundaries; seats decreased from 44 to 39
2015	23	6	0	9	1	Conservative
2019	4	7	0	26	2	R4U
2023	11	4	0	22	2	R4U

== Maps ==
1976 results map

1979 results map

1983 results map

1987 results map

1991 results map

1995 results map

1999 results map

2003 results map

2007 results map

2011 results map

2015 results map

2019 results map

2023 results map

== By-election results ==
A by-election occurs when seats become vacant between council elections. Below is a summary of by-elections from 1983 onwards. Full by-election results are listed under the last regular election preceding the by-election and can be found by clicking on the ward name.

=== 1983-1994 ===
Ward	Date	Incumbent party	Winning party
The Chesterfords	29 March 1990	Liberal Democrats	Conservative
Felsted	26 April 1990	Liberal Democrats	Liberal Democrats
Saffron Walden Castle	9 May 1990	Liberal Democrats	Liberal Democrats
Takeley	12 March 1992	Conservative	Liberal Democrats
The Rodings	19 November 1992	Conservative	Liberal Democrats
Saffron Walden Castle	1 April 1993	Liberal Democrats	Liberal Democrats
Saffron Walden Plantation	14 April 1994	Conservative	Liberal Democrats

=== 1995-2006 ===
Ward	Date	Incumbent party	Winning party
Great Dunmow South	26 June 1997	Liberal Democrats	Liberal Democrats
Hatfield Broad Oak	3 July 1997	Liberal Democrats	Conservative
The Sampfords	25 September 1997	Independent	Conservative
Stebbing	11 December 1997	Independent	Liberal Democrats
Stansted Mountfitchet	7 May 1998	Liberal Democrats	Liberal Democrats
Stort Valley	13 April 2000	Liberal Democrats	Liberal Democrats
Birchanger	15 June 2000	Conservative	Conservative
The Chesterfords	23 November 2000	Conservative	Liberal Democrats
Great Dunmow South	21 October 2004	Liberal Democrats	Liberal Democrats
Great Dunmow South	14 July 2005	Liberal Democrats	Conservative
Wimbish & Debden	27 October 2005	Liberal Democrats	Conservative
Newport	8 June 2006	Liberal Democrats	Liberal Democrats

=== 2007-2018 ===
Ward	Date	Incumbent party	Winning party
Great Dunmow North	5 June 2008	Liberal Democrats	Conservative
Newport	2 May 2013	Liberal Democrats	Independent
Felsted	25 July 2013	Conservative	Conservative
Elsenham & Henham	16 February 2017	Liberal Democrats	R4U
Elsenham & Henham	16 February 2017	Liberal Democrats	R4U
Newport	4 May 2017	R4U	R4U

=== 2019-present ===
Ward	Date	Incumbent party	Winning party
Newport	6 May 2021	R4U	R4U
The Sampfords	6 May 2021	R4U	Conservative
Great Dunmow South & Barnston	5 January 2023	R4U	Conservative
Stort Valley	25 June 2026	Liberal Democrats	Conservative
Great Dunmow North	30 July 2026	R4U	Conservative
