= 2003 Uttlesford District Council election =

2003 English local election

- 1 May 2003

All 44 seats to Uttlesford District Council 23 seats needed for a majority

	First party	Second party	Third party
Party	Liberal Democrats	Conservative	Independent
Seats won	31	10	3
Seat change	▲13	▼6	▼3
Popular vote	19,108	14,043	2,103
Percentage	50.3%	39.1%	5.5%
Swing	▲6.3%	▲1.7%	▼4.2%
Council control before election
No overall control
Council control after election
Liberal Democrats

The 2003 Uttlesford District Council election took place on 1 May 2003 to elect members of Uttlesford District Council in England. This was on the same day as other local elections.

== Summary ==
=== Election result ===
2003 Uttlesford District Council election
Party	Candidates	Seats	Gains	Losses	Net gain/loss	Seats %	Votes %	Votes	+/−
Liberal Democrats	42	31	6	0	▲10	70.5	49.8	17,816	+5.8
Conservative	39	10	0	5	▼5	22.7	39.4	14,083	+2.0
Independent	10	3	2	2	▼3	6.8	5.9	2,103	–3.8
Labour	5	0	0	1	▼2	0.0	4.7	1,677	–4.3
Green	2	0	0	0	Steady	0.0	0.2	86	N/A

== Ward results ==
Incumbent councillors standing for re-election are marked with an asterisk (*). Changes in seats do not take into account by-elections or defections.

=== Ashdon ===
Ashdon
Party	Candidate	Votes	%	±%
Liberal Democrats	Martin Savage	351	60.5	+47.6
Independent	Raymond Tyler*	173	29.8	–30.0
Independent	Tariq Ali	56	9.7	N/A
Majority		178	30.7	N/A
Turnout		580	44.9	+3.8
Registered electors		1,292		
Liberal Democrats gain from Independent		Swing	▲38.8	

=== Barnston & High Easter ===
Barnston & High Easter
Party	Candidate	Votes	%
Conservative	Eric Hicks	316	61.0
Liberal Democrats	Deborah Bryce	202	39.0
Majority		114	22.0
Turnout		518	41.2
Registered electors		1,257	
Conservative win (new seat)			

=== Birchanger ===
Birchanger
Party	Candidate	Votes	%	±%
Independent	Elizabeth Godwin	269	72.7	N/A
Conservative	Raymond Gooding	74	20.0	–52.5
Liberal Democrats	David Raynor	27	7.3	–20.2
Majority		195	52.7	N/A
Turnout		370	45.3	+4.2
Registered electors		817		
Independent gain from Conservative				

=== Broad Oak & The Hallingburys ===
Broad Oak & The Hallingburys (2 seats)
Party	Candidate	Votes	%
Conservative	Keith Arctus	645	66.6
Conservative	Alan Row*	607	62.7
Liberal Democrats	Robert Wingard	287	29.6
Liberal Democrats	Elizabeth Jones	265	27.4
Turnout		~968	36.6
Registered electors		2,646	
Conservative win (new seat)			
Conservative win (new seat)			

=== Clavering ===
Clavering
Party	Candidate	Votes	%	±%
Independent	Edgar Abrahams*	352	84.4	–2.9
Liberal Democrats	Ruth Rawlinson	65	15.6	+2.9
Majority		287	68.8	–5.8
Turnout		417	36.7	+0.4
Registered electors		1,137		
Independent hold		Swing	▼2.9	

=== Elsenham & Henham ===
Elsenham & Henham (2 seats)
Party	Candidate	Votes	%
Liberal Democrats	David Morson*	533	57.0
Liberal Democrats	Catherine Dean*	532	56.9
Conservative	Tamsin Johnston	367	39.3
Conservative	Keith Mackman	275	29.4
Turnout		~935	33.9
Registered electors		2,757	
Liberal Democrats win (new seat)			
Liberal Democrats win (new seat)			

=== Felsted ===
Felsted (2 seats)
Party	Candidate	Votes	%	±%
Liberal Democrats	David Gregory*	539	60.5	+4.2
Liberal Democrats	Alan Thawley*	531	59.6	+5.3
Conservative	John Howson	336	37.7	–4.2
Conservative	Louise McLaughlin	298	33.4	–6.2
Turnout		~892	34.2	–10.4
Registered electors		2,607		
Liberal Democrats hold				
Liberal Democrats hold				

=== Great Dunmow North ===
Great Dunmow North (2 seats)
Party	Candidate	Votes	%	±%
Liberal Democrats	Mark Gaylor*	470	74.1	+22.2
Liberal Democrats	John Murphy	403	63.5	+24.5
Conservative	Carol James	152	24.0	–5.7
Conservative	Heather Powell	136	21.4	–3.5
Green	Michael Earley	46	7.2	N/A
Turnout		~635	31.2	–4.0
Registered electors		2,034		
Liberal Democrats hold				
Liberal Democrats hold				

=== Great Dunmow South ===
Great Dunmow South (2 seats)
Party	Candidate	Votes	%	±%
Liberal Democrats	Rodney Copping*	660	62.2	+0.2
Liberal Democrats	Keith Clarke	599	56.5	–4.1
Liberal Democrats	Frank Silver	598	56.4	N/A
Conservative	Douglas James	393	37.1	+4.0
Conservative	Helen Rothwell	374	35.3	+2.6
Conservative	Barrie Powell	354	33.4	N/A
Turnout		~1,060	29.4	–3.7
Registered electors		3,607		
Liberal Democrats hold				
Liberal Democrats hold				
Liberal Democrats win (new seat)				

=== Hatfield Heath ===
Hatfield Heath
Party	Candidate	Votes	%	±%
Independent	Reginald Lemon	286	57.5	N/A
Conservative	Peter Lewis*	185	37.2	–17.9
Liberal Democrats	Marion Dyer	26	5.2	–1.8
Majority		101	20.3	N/A
Turnout		497	37.1	–0.2
Registered electors		1,338		
Independent gain from Conservative				

=== Littlebury ===
Littlebury
Party	Candidate	Votes	%	±%
Conservative	Janet Menell*	395	78.1	–6.5
Liberal Democrats	Alan Johnson	111	21.9	+6.5
Majority		284	40.2	–13.0
Turnout		506	41.2	–2.8
Registered electors		1,228		
Conservative hold		Swing	▼6.5	

=== Newport ===
Newport (2 seats)
Party	Candidate	Votes	%	±%
Liberal Democrats	William Bowker*	838	67.2	+7.1
Liberal Democrats	Peter Wilcock*	834	66.9	N/A
Conservative	Marilyn Scott	357	28.6	N/A
Conservative	Ann Smith	338	27.1	N/A
Turnout		~1,247	48.4	+12.0
Registered electors		2,576		
Liberal Democrats hold				
Liberal Democrats win (new seat)				

=== Saffron Walden Audley ===
Saffron Walden Audley (3 seats)
Party	Candidate	Votes	%	±%
Liberal Democrats	Michael Hibbs*	885	57.7	+12.9
Liberal Democrats	Christine Bayley*	713	46.5	+17.4
Liberal Democrats	Victor Lelliott	683	44.5	N/A
Conservative	David Miller*	655	42.7	+3.3
Conservative	Alistair Walters	538	35.1	±0.0
Conservative	Jane Muir	486	31.7	N/A
Independent	Richard Glover	217	14.2	N/A
Independent	John Cox	174	11.3	N/A
Turnout		~1,533	40.6	–5.5
Registered electors		3,777		
Liberal Democrats hold				
Liberal Democrats gain from Conservative				
Liberal Democrats win (new seat)				

=== Saffron Walden Castle ===
Saffron Walden Castle (3 seats)
Party	Candidate	Votes	%	±%
Liberal Democrats	Richard Freeman	539	41.2	+9.5
Liberal Democrats	Barbara Hughes	526	40.2	+11.9
Liberal Democrats	Stephen Jones	496	38.0	N/A
Conservative	Sarfraz Anjum	421	32.2	–1.7
Labour	Peter Preece	416	31.8	–1.5
Conservative	Robert O'Neill*	409	31.3	–1.1
Conservative	Jessica Hess	395	30.2	N/A
Labour	Yvonne Morton	280	21.4	–11.1
Labour	Simon Trimnell	276	21.1	N/A
Turnout		~1,307	35.2	–5.4
Registered electors		3,713		
Liberal Democrats gain from Conservative				
Liberal Democrats gain from Labour				
Liberal Democrats win (new seat)				

=== Saffron Walden Shire ===
Saffron Walden Shire (3 seats)
Party	Candidate	Votes	%	±%
Liberal Democrats	Helen Baker	531	42.6	+19.0
Conservative	Alfred Ketteridge*	502	40.2	–5.6
Liberal Democrats	Patrick Boland	484	38.8	+18.6
Labour	Russell Green*	468	37.5	–12.2
Liberal Democrats	Joan Dawson	457	36.6	N/A
Conservative	Adrian Lee	377	30.2	–11.4
Conservative	Grant St Clair-Armstrong	364	29.2	N/A
Labour	Steven Lake	237	19.0	N/A
Turnout		~1,247	32.5	–2.5
Registered electors		3,838		
Liberal Democrats gain from Labour				
Conservative hold				
Liberal Democrats win (new seat)				

=== Stansted North ===
Stansted North (2 seats)
Party	Candidate	Votes	%
Liberal Democrats	Geoffrey Sell*	599	55.3
Liberal Democrats	Anne Marchant	533	49.2
Conservative	Alan Williams	385	35.6
Conservative	Sian Lloyd	354	32.7
Independent	Raymond Clifford	229	21.2
Turnout		~1,083	41.4
Registered electors		2,615	
Liberal Democrats win (new seat)			
Liberal Democrats win (new seat)			

=== Stansted South ===
Stansted South (2 seats)
Party	Candidate	Votes	%
Liberal Democrats	Alan Dean*	361	68.6
Liberal Democrats	Vanessa Ollier	355	67.5
Conservative	Richard Wallace	172	32.7
Conservative	John Flack	127	24.1
Turnout		~526	24.6
Registered electors		2,138	
Liberal Democrats win (new seat)			
Liberal Democrats win (new seat)			

=== Stebbing ===
Stebbing
Party	Candidate	Votes	%	±%
Liberal Democrats	Christina Cant*	267	64.8	–3.9
Conservative	Mark Brackenbury	145	35.2	+3.9
Majority		122	29.6	–7.8
Turnout		412	32.8	–6.0
Registered electors		1,255		
Liberal Democrats hold		Swing	▼3.9	

=== Stort Valley ===
Stort Valley
Party	Candidate	Votes	%	±%
Liberal Democrats	Janice Loughlin	331	62.8	+1.7
Conservative	Edward Oliver	196	37.2	–1.7
Majority		135	25.6	+3.4
Turnout		527	45.0	+1.6
Registered electors		1,172		
Liberal Democrats hold		Swing	▲1.7	

=== Takeley & The Cranfields ===
Takeley & The Cranfields (2 seats)
Party	Candidate	Votes	%
Liberal Democrats	Richard Harris	479	46.7
Conservative	Jacqueline Cheetham*	472	46.0
Liberal Democrats	Paul Westlake	416	40.6
Conservative	Derek Jones*	388	37.8
Independent	Richard Smith*	178	17.4
Turnout		~1,026	42.6
Registered electors		2,408	
Liberal Democrats win (new seat)			
Conservative win (new seat)			

=== The Chesterfords ===
The Chesterfords
Party	Candidate	Votes	%	±%
Liberal Democrats	E. Tealby-Watson	424	52.3	+6.1
Conservative	H. Rolfe	387	47.7	–6.1
Majority		37	4.6	N/A
Turnout		811	62.5	+21.3
Registered electors		1,302		
Liberal Democrats gain from Conservative		Swing	▲6.1	

=== The Eastons ===
The Eastons
Party	Candidate	Votes	%	±%
Conservative	Cecile Down*	350	76.4	+31.6
Liberal Democrats	Shirley Wilcock	108	23.6	–15.4
Majority		242	52.8	+47.0
Turnout		458	36.9	–11.8
Registered electors		1,240		
Conservative hold		Swing	▲23.5	

=== The Rodings ===
The Rodings
Party	Candidate	Votes	%	±%
Conservative	Susan Flack*	608	89.5	+37.6
Liberal Democrats	Jillien Bolvig-Hansen	71	10.5	–37.6
Majority		537	79.1	+75.2
Turnout		679	49.2	–8.0
Registered electors		1,379		
Conservative hold		Swing	▲37.6	

=== The Sampfords ===
The Sampfords
Party	Candidate	Votes	%	±%
Conservative	Susan Schneider*	344	61.1	+8.3
Liberal Democrats	David Morgan	219	38.9	–8.3
Majority		125	22.2	+16.6
Turnout		563	40.2	–0.1
Registered electors		1,400		
Conservative hold		Swing	▲8.3	

=== Wenden Lofts ===
Wenden Lofts
Party	Candidate	Votes	%	±%
Conservative	Robert Chambers*	406	70.6	+12.1
Liberal Democrats	Neville Reed	169	29.4	–12.1
Majority		237	41.2	+24.2
Turnout		575	47.7	–8.3
Registered electors		1,205		
Conservative hold		Swing	▲12.1	

=== Wimbish & Debden ===
Wimbish & Debden
Party	Candidate	Votes	%	±%
Liberal Democrats	David Corke	299	58.9	+31.1
Independent	Rodney Stone*	169	33.3	–38.9
Green	Simon Lacey	40	7.9	N/A
Majority		130	25.6	N/A
Turnout		508	35.4	–7.9
Registered electors		1,434		
Liberal Democrats gain from Independent		Swing	▲35.0	

== By-elections ==
Great Dunmow South By-Election 21 October 2004
Party	Candidate	Votes	%	±%
Liberal Democrats	Emily Gower	615	61.9	−0.8
Conservative	Michael Miller	378	38.1	+0.8
Majority		237	23.8	
Turnout		993	28.2	
Liberal Democrats hold		Swing		

Great Dunmow South By-Election 14 July 2005
Party	Candidate	Votes	%	±%
Conservative	Michael Miller	537	58.6	+21.3
Liberal Democrats	Robert Wingard	380	41.4	−21.3
Majority		157	17.2	
Turnout		917	26.0	
Conservative gain from Liberal Democrats		Swing		

Wimbish and Debden By-Election 27 October 2005
Party	Candidate	Votes	%	±%
Conservative	Tina Knight	300	53.6	+53.6
Liberal Democrats	David Morgan	260	46.4	−12.5
Majority		40	7.2	
Turnout		560	24.0	
Conservative gain from Liberal Democrats		Swing		

Newport By-Election 8 June 2006
Party	Candidate	Votes	%	±%
Liberal Democrats	Andrew Yarwood	746	60.4	−9.7
Conservative	Rad Gooding	489	39.6	+9.7
Majority		257	20.8	
Turnout		1,235	48.7	
Liberal Democrats hold		Swing		
