= 2011 Uttlesford District Council election =

2011 English local election

- 5 May 2024

All 44 seats to Uttlesford District Council 23 seats needed for a majority

	First party	Second party	Third party
Party	Conservative	Liberal Democrats	Independent
Seats won	34	8	2
Seat change	▲8	▼7	▼1
Popular vote	30,158	16,064	910
Percentage	58.7%	31.3%	1.8%
Swing	▲5.3%	▼10.5%	▼1.8%
Council control before election
Conservative
Council control after election
Conservative

The 2011 Uttlesford District Council election took place on 5 May 2011 to elect members of Uttlesford District Council in Essex, England. This was on the same day as other local elections.

== Summary ==
=== Election result ===
2011 Uttlesford District Council election
Party	Candidates	Seats	Gains	Losses	Net gain/loss	Seats %	Votes %	Votes	+/−
Conservative	42	34	8	0	▲8	77.3	58.7	30,158	+5.3
Liberal Democrats	44	8	0	7	▼7	18.2	31.3	16,064	–10.5
Independent	2	2	0	1	▼1	4.5	1.8	910	–1.8
Labour	17	0	0	0	Steady	0.0	8.2	4,235	+7.2

== Ward results ==
Incumbent councillors standing for re-election are marked with an asterisk (*). Changes in seats do not take into account by-elections or defections.

=== Ashdon ===
Ashdon
Party	Candidate	Votes	%	±%
Conservative	Andrew Ketteridge	529	71.2	+21.4
Liberal Democrats	Roger Harcourt	214	28.8	–16.1
Majority		315	42.4	+37.5
Turnout		743	55.6	–3.4
Registered electors		1,352		
Conservative hold		Swing	▲18.8	

=== Barnston & High Easter ===
Barnston & High Easter
Party	Candidate	Votes	%	±%
Conservative	Eric Hicks*	525	75.9	–3.2
Liberal Democrats	Benjamin Davies	167	24.1	+3.2
Majority		358	51.8	–6.4
Turnout		692	52.7	+9.7
Registered electors		1,335		
Conservative hold		Swing	▼3.2	

=== Birchanger ===
Birchanger
Party	Candidate	Votes	%	±%
Independent	Elizabeth Godwin*	381	79.4	–11.3
Liberal Democrats	John Hudson*	99	20.6	+11.3
Majority		282	58.8	–22.6
Turnout		480	44.1	+3.5
Registered electors		1,108		
Independent hold		Swing	▼11.3	

=== Broad Oak & The Hallingburys ===
Broad Oak & The Hallingburys (2 seats)
Party	Candidate	Votes	%	±%
Conservative	Lesley Wells*	872	59.7	–16.1
Conservative	Keith Artus*	836	57.2	–17.5
Liberal Democrats	Marion Dyer	204	14.0	–3.3
Labour	Bill McCarthy	180	12.3	N/A
Liberal Democrats	Jane Benson	127	8.7	–7.0
Turnout		~1,461	52.8	+12.1
Registered electors		2,767		
Conservative hold				
Conservative hold				

=== Clavering ===
Clavering
Party	Candidate	Votes	%	±%
Conservative	Edward Oliver	514	80.1	N/A
Liberal Democrats	Daniel Caton	128	19.9	+13.3
Majority		386	60.2	N/A
Turnout		642	57.6	+10.0
Registered electors		1,114		
Conservative gain from Independent				

=== Elsenham & Henham ===
Elsenham & Henham (2 seats)
Party	Candidate	Votes	%	±%
Liberal Democrats	David Morson*	862	56.9	+2.3
Liberal Democrats	Elizabeth Parr	798	52.7	–1.3
Conservative	Anthony Goodwin	542	35.8	–3.9
Conservative	Keith Howard	394	26.0	–10.7
Labour	Hilary Todd	116	7.7	N/A
Labour	John Todd	86	5.7	N/A
Turnout		~1,515	53.0	+11.0
Registered electors		2,858		
Liberal Democrats hold				
Liberal Democrats hold				

=== Felsted ===
Felsted (2 seats)
Party	Candidate	Votes	%	±%
Conservative	David Crome	1,204	73.7	+15.5
Conservative	Stephanie Favell	1,113	68.1	+15.9
Liberal Democrats	Brian Flynn	320	19.6	–21.7
Liberal Democrats	David Richardson	314	19.2	–19.9
Turnout		~1,633	41.9	–1.0
Registered electors		3,898		
Conservative hold				
Conservative hold				

=== Great Dunmow North ===
Great Dunmow North (2 seats)
Party	Candidate	Votes	%	±%
Conservative	John Davey	744	62.3	+24.0
Conservative	Paul Davies	689	57.7	+22.2
Liberal Democrats	Ron Clover*	367	30.7	–23.7
Liberal Democrats	Roy Roberts	292	24.5	–22.7
Turnout		~1,194	41.8	+6.6
Registered electors		2,857		
Conservative gain from Liberal Democrats				
Conservative gain from Liberal Democrats				

=== Great Dunmow South ===
Great Dunmow South (3 seats)
Party	Candidate	Votes	%	±%
Conservative	Graham Baker	962	60.0	+12.9
Conservative	Keith Mackman	907	56.5	+10.8
Conservative	Vic Ranger	855	53.3	+9.1
Liberal Democrats	David Perry	507	31.6	–19.7
Liberal Democrats	Julia Hirons	500	31.2	–15.6
Liberal Democrats	Ann Taylor	467	29.1	–13.9
Turnout		~1,604	40.5	+1.3
Registered electors		3,961		
Conservative gain from Liberal Democrats				
Conservative hold				
Conservative gain from Liberal Democrats				

=== Hatfield Heath ===
Hatfield Heath
Party	Candidate	Votes	%	±%
Independent	Mark Lemon*	529	88.2	–0.3
Liberal Democrats	Elizabeth Edwards	71	11.8	+0.3
Majority		458	76.4	–0.6
Turnout		600	42.7	+7.5
Registered electors		1,416		
Independent hold		Swing	▼0.3	

=== Littlebury ===
Littlebury
Party	Candidate	Votes	%	±%
Conservative	Janet Menell*	551	76.1	–10.0
Labour	Jane Berney	104	14.4	N/A
Liberal Democrats	Geoffrey Powers	69	9.5	–4.4
Majority		447	61.7	–10.6
Turnout		724	55.5	+8.1
Registered electors		1,315		
Conservative hold				

=== Newport ===
Newport (2 seats)
Party	Candidate	Votes	%	±%
Conservative	Jeremy Rose	727	49.7	+9.3
Liberal Democrats	Peter Wilcock*	689	47.1	–8.9
Conservative	Patricia Rose	635	43.4	+4.4
Liberal Democrats	Rory Gleeson	549	37.6	–15.5
Turnout		~1,462	54.4	+2.8
Registered electors		2,687		
Conservative gain from Liberal Democrats				
Liberal Democrats hold				

=== Saffron Walden Audley ===
Saffron Walden Audley (3 seats)
Party	Candidate	Votes	%	±%
Conservative	Alastair Walters*	1,003	55.2	+6.1
Conservative	David Watson*	957	52.6	+5.5
Conservative	Douglas Perry	947	52.1	+5.4
Liberal Democrats	Michael Hibbs	763	42.0	–4.3
Liberal Democrats	David Foley	505	27.8	–9.5
Liberal Democrats	Keith Crook	499	27.4	–9.2
Labour	John Evans	380	20.9	N/A
Labour	Francis Deutsch	371	20.4	N/A
Turnout		~1,818	47.7	+2.6
Registered electors		3,812		
Conservative hold				
Conservative hold				
Conservative hold				

=== Saffron Walden Castle ===
Saffron Walden Castle (3 seats)
Party	Candidate	Votes	%	±%
Conservative	Bob Eastham	857	48.4	+1.0
Conservative	Heather Asker*	811	45.8	–0.2
Conservative	David Sadler*	772	43.6	–0.8
Liberal Democrats	Richard Freeman	465	26.3	–12.8
Labour	Daphne Cornell	453	25.6	+10.1
Liberal Democrats	Elizabeth Jones	413	23.3	–12.2
Labour	Arthur Coote	398	22.5	+8.7
Labour	Simon Trimnell	380	21.5	N/A
Liberal Democrats	Paul Westlake	345	19.5	–14.0
Turnout		~1,771	47.7	+5.9
Registered electors		3,712		
Conservative hold				
Conservative hold				
Conservative hold				

=== Saffron Walden Shire ===
Saffron Walden Shire (3 seats)
Party	Candidate	Votes	%	±%
Conservative	Jim Ketteridge*	1,184	61.5	+0.2
Conservative	Keith Eden*	1,002	52.0	+0.5
Conservative	Howard Rolfe*	847	44.0	–3.9
Labour	Yvonne Morton	411	21.3	N/A
Labour	Betty McGregor	378	19.6	N/A
Liberal Democrats	Sonia Sault	373	19.4	–18.9
Labour	Adrian Williamson	366	19.0	N/A
Liberal Democrats	Simon Taylor	312	16.2	–21.2
Liberal Democrats	Jonah Rhodes	300	15.6	–19.8
Turnout		~1,926	46.0	+7.6
Registered electors		4,187		
Conservative hold				
Conservative hold				
Conservative hold				

=== Stansted North ===
Stansted North (2 seats)
Party	Candidate	Votes	%	±%
Conservative	John Salmon*	773	51.1	+1.0
Conservative	Joe Rich	707	46.7	–1.1
Liberal Democrats	Geoffrey Sell*	654	43.2	–5.8
Liberal Democrats	Melvin Caton	538	35.6	–9.5
Labour	Eric Davies	122	8.1	N/A
Turnout		~1,513	56.9	+6.1
Registered electors		2,659		
Conservative hold				
Conservative gain from Liberal Democrats				

=== Stansted South ===
Stansted South (2 seats)
Party	Candidate	Votes	%	±%
Liberal Democrats	Alan Dean*	626	59.4	+4.5
Liberal Democrats	Iris Evans	493	46.8	+2.6
Conservative	Nick Church	428	40.6	+2.0
Conservative	Dephne Wallace-Jarvis	324	30.8	–4.9
Turnout		~1,053	42.8	+9.6
Registered electors		2,461		
Liberal Democrats hold				
Liberal Democrats hold				

=== Stebbing ===
Stebbing
Party	Candidate	Votes	%	±%
Liberal Democrats	Christina Cant*	329	52.4	+0.5
Conservative	Sandi Merifield	255	40.6	–7.5
Labour	David Sowter	44	7.0	N/A
Majority		74	11.8	+8.0
Turnout		628	51.7	–0.2
Registered electors		1,216		
Liberal Democrats hold		Swing	▲4.0	

=== Stort Valley ===
Stort Valley
Party	Candidate	Votes	%	±%
Liberal Democrats	Janice Loughlin*	388	56.3	+3.4
Conservative	Kathryn Chambers	301	43.7	–3.4
Majority		87	12.6	+6.8
Turnout		689	58.4	+5.3
Registered electors		1,192		
Liberal Democrats hold		Swing	▲3.4	

=== Takeley & The Cranfields ===
Takeley & The Cranfields (2 seats)
Party	Candidate	Votes	%	±%
Conservative	Jackie Cheetham*	1,042	73.2	+3.0
Conservative	Derek Jones*	827	58.1	–1.2
Labour	Terry Brandon	206	14.5	N/A
Liberal Democrats	Anna Halmane	201	14.1	–20.0
Liberal Democrats	Ben Matthews	126	8.9	–11.4
Turnout		~1,423	40.2	–2.4
Registered electors		3,540		
Conservative hold				
Conservative hold				

=== Thaxted ===
Thaxted (2 seats)
Party	Candidate	Votes	%	±%
Conservative	John Freeman	691	49.8	+5.5
Liberal Democrats	Martin Foley*	671	48.4	–10.0
Conservative	Terry Frostick	604	43.5	+4.8
Liberal Democrats	Antoinette Wattebot*	517	37.3	–11.1
Turnout		~1,387	51.8	+5.0
Registered electors		2,678		
Conservative gain from Liberal Democrats				
Liberal Democrats hold				

=== The Chesterfords ===
The Chesterfords
Party	Candidate	Votes	%	±%
Conservative	Julie Redfern*	579	77.6	+15.9
Liberal Democrats	John Watkiss	167	22.4	–15.9
Majority		412	55.2	+31.8
Turnout		746	58.6	+0.6
Registered electors		1,298		
Conservative hold		Swing	▲15.9	

=== The Eastons ===
The Eastons
Party	Candidate	Votes	%	±%
Conservative	Lawrence Smith	487	81.2	+0.6
Liberal Democrats	Shirley Wilcock	113	18.8	–0.6
Majority		374	62.4	+1.2
Turnout		600	50.0	+7.7
Registered electors		1,211		
Conservative hold		Swing	▲0.6	

=== The Rodings ===
The Rodings
Party	Candidate	Votes	%	±%
Conservative	Susan Barker*	554	81.7	–5.9
Liberal Democrats	Ruth Rawlinson	124	18.3	+5.9
Majority		430	63.4	–11.8
Turnout		678	49.5	+4.1
Registered electors		1,375		
Conservative hold		Swing	▼5.9	

=== The Sampfords ===
The Sampfords
Party	Candidate	Votes	%	±%
Conservative	Simon Howell*	565	74.0	+1.7
Liberal Democrats	David Morgan	199	26.0	–1.7
Majority		366	48.0	+3.4
Turnout		764	53.3	+7.4
Registered electors		1,477		
Conservative hold		Swing	▲1.7	

=== Wenden Lofts ===
Wenden Lofts
Party	Candidate	Votes	%	±%
Conservative	Robert Chambers*	552	74.6	–2.5
Labour	Caroline Fookes	126	17.0	N/A
Liberal Democrats	Alan Thawley	62	8.4	–14.5
Majority		426	57.6	+3.4
Turnout		740	60.6	+7.8
Registered electors		1,230		
Conservative hold				

=== Wimbish & Debden ===
Wimbish & Debden
Party	Candidate	Votes	%	±%
Conservative	Tina Knight*	490	66.1	–7.6
Liberal Democrats	Gwyneth Pennicard	137	18.5	–7.8
Labour	Peter Donovan	114	15.4	N/A
Majority		353	47.6	+0.2
Turnout		741	43.5	+2.3
Registered electors		1,728		
Conservative hold		Swing	▲0.1	

== By-elections ==
Newport By-Election 2 May 2013
Party	Candidate	Votes	%	±%
Independent	Joanna Parry	428	36.5	+36.5
Conservative	Peter Arscott	380	32.4	−18.9
Liberal Democrats	Howard Bowman	240	20.5	−28.2
Labour	Denis Mongon	125	10.7	+10.7
Majority		48	4.1	
Turnout		1,173		
Independent gain from Liberal Democrats		Swing		

Felsted By-Election 25 July 2013
Party	Candidate	Votes	%	±%
Conservative	Marie Felton	557	54.1	−24.9
Liberal Democrats	Antoinette Wattebot	253	24.6	+3.6
UKIP	Alan Stannard	181	17.6	+17.6
Labour	Yad Zanganah	38	3.7	+3.7
Majority		304	29.5	
Turnout		1,029		
Conservative hold		Swing		
