= 1999 Uttlesford District Council election =

1999 English local election

- 6 May 1999

All 42 seats to Uttlesford District Council 22 seats needed for a majority

	First party	Second party
Party	Liberal Democrats	Conservative
Seats won	18	16
Seat change	▼1	▲4
Popular vote	13,961	11,876
Percentage	44.0%	37.4%
Swing	▼0.5%	▲4.1%
	Third party	Fourth party
Party	Independent	Labour
Seats won	6	2
Seat change	▼1	▼2
Popular vote	3,077	2,844
Percentage	9.7%	9.0%
Swing	▲3.1%	▼6.6%
- Winner of each seat at the 1999 Uttlesford District Council election.
Council control before election
No overall control
Council control after election
No overall control

The 1999 Uttlesford District Council election took place on 6 May 1999 to elect members of Uttlesford District Council in England. This was on the same day as other local elections.

== Summary ==
=== Election result ===
1999 Uttlesford District Council election
Party	Candidates	Seats	Gains	Losses	Net gain/loss	Seats %	Votes %	Votes	+/−
Liberal Democrats	42	18	3	4	▼1	42.9	44.0	13,960	–0.5
Conservative	35	16	5	1	▲4	38.1	37.4	11,876	+4.1
Independent	11	6	1	2	▼1	14.3	9.7	3,077	+3.1
Labour	12	2	0	2	▼2	4.8	9.0	2,844	–6.6

== Ward results ==
Incumbent councillors standing for re-election are marked with an asterisk (*). Changes in seats do not take into account by-elections or defections.

=== Ashdon ===
Ashdon
Party	Candidate	Votes	%	±%
Independent	R. Tyler*	259	59.8	–1.2
Labour	C. Howe-Browne	118	27.3	–11.7
Liberal Democrats	R. Albrow	56	12.9	N/A
Majority		141	32.5	+10.5
Turnout		433	41.1	–9.9
Registered electors		892		
Independent hold		Swing	▲5.3	

=== Birchanger ===
Birchanger
Party	Candidate	Votes	%	±%
Conservative	D. Haggerwood*	232	72.5	+21.8
Liberal Democrats	J. Loughlin	88	27.5	+13.2
Majority		144	45.0	+29.3
Turnout		320	41.1	–5.7
Registered electors		786		
Conservative hold		Swing	▲4.3	

=== Clavering ===
Clavering
Party	Candidate	Votes	%	±%
Independent	E. Abrahams*	454	87.3	+11.8
Liberal Democrats	W. Ratcliffe	66	12.7	–11.8
Majority		388	74.6	+23.5
Turnout		520	36.3	–6.5
Registered electors		1,431		
Independent hold		Swing	▲11.8	

=== Elsenham ===
Elsenham
Party	Candidate	Votes	%	±%
Liberal Democrats	M. Dean	364	55.1	+6.4
Conservative	J. Hurwitz*	297	44.9	–6.4
Majority		67	10.2	N/A
Turnout		661	37.1	+5.5
Registered electors		1,784		
Liberal Democrats gain from Conservative		Swing	▲6.4	

=== Felsted ===
Felsted (2 seats)
Party	Candidate	Votes	%	±%
Liberal Democrats	D. Gregory*	587	56.3	–0.2
Liberal Democrats	A. Thawley*	566	54.3	+6.0
Conservative	J. Moore	437	41.9	–4.9
Conservative	S. Evans	413	39.6	N/A
Turnout		~1,042	44.6	–5.9
Registered electors		2,336		
Liberal Democrats hold				
Liberal Democrats hold				

=== Great Dunmow North ===
Great Dunmow North (2 seats)
Party	Candidate	Votes	%	±%
Liberal Democrats	M. Gayler*	455	51.9	–2.3
Liberal Democrats	G. Powers*	342	39.0	–3.7
Conservative	H. Powell	260	29.7	+5.4
Labour	H. Wright	232	26.5	–1.7
Conservative	L. Collonson	218	24.9	+4.3
Labour	P. Holloway	169	19.3	–0.2
Turnout		~876	35.2	–16.8
Registered electors		2,489		
Liberal Democrats hold				
Liberal Democrats hold				

=== Great Dunmow South ===
Great Dunmow South (2 seats)
Party	Candidate	Votes	%	±%
Liberal Democrats	R. Copping*	686	62.0	+0.6
Liberal Democrats	C. Little*	670	60.6	+0.4
Conservative	D. James	366	33.1	–0.5
Conservative	E. Hicks	362	32.7	+1.3
Turnout		~1,106	33.1	–7.7
Registered electors		3,342		
Liberal Democrats hold				
Liberal Democrats hold				

=== Great Hallingbury ===
Great Hallingbury
Party	Candidate	Votes	%	±%
Independent	A. Streeter*	170	74.2	N/A
Liberal Democrats	S. Wilcock	59	25.8	N/A
Majority		111	48.4	N/A
Turnout		229	44.5	N/A
Registered electors		517		
Independent hold				

=== Hatfield Broad Oak ===
Hatfield Broad Oak
Party	Candidate	Votes	%	±%
Conservative	R. Merrion*	260	57.8	+17.0
Liberal Democrats	P. Westlake	190	42.2	–17.0
Majority		70	15.6	N/A
Turnout		450	48.2	–3.6
Registered electors		935		
Conservative gain from Liberal Democrats		Swing	▲17.0	

=== Hatfield Heath ===
Hatfield Heath
Party	Candidate	Votes	%	±%
Conservative	P. Lewis	269	55.1	+11.0
Labour	W. McCarthy	185	37.9	–5.9
Liberal Democrats	M. Johnson	34	7.0	–5.1
Majority		84	17.2	+16.8
Turnout		488	37.3	–5.0
Registered electors		1,310		
Conservative hold		Swing	▲8.5	

=== Henham ===
Henham
Party	Candidate	Votes	%	±%
Liberal Democrats	D. Morson*	384	63.8	+11.9
Conservative	R. Braeckman	218	36.2	–11.9
Majority		166	27.6	+23.8
Turnout		602	47.8	–5.3
Registered electors		1,262		
Liberal Democrats hold		Swing	▲11.9	

=== Little Hallingbury ===
Little Hallingbury
Party	Candidate	Votes	%	±%
Conservative	A. Row*	295	74.3	+9.6
Liberal Democrats	G. Heald	102	25.7	–9.6
Majority		193	48.6	+19.2
Turnout		397	34.6	–3.9
Registered electors		1,150		
Conservative hold		Swing	▲9.6	

=== Littlebury ===
Littlebury
Party	Candidate	Votes	%	±%
Conservative	J. Menell*	347	84.6	N/A
Liberal Democrats	K. Drinkwater	63	15.4	N/A
Majority		284	69.2	N/A
Turnout		410	43.8	N/A
Registered electors		936		
Conservative hold				

=== Newport ===
Newport
Party	Candidate	Votes	%	±%
Liberal Democrats	W. Bowker*	366	60.1	+9.9
Independent	T. Archer	243	39.9	N/A
Majority		123	20.2	+3.8
Turnout		609	36.4	–14.1
Registered electors		1,673		
Liberal Democrats hold				

=== Rickling ===
Rickling
Party	Candidate	Votes	%	±%
Liberal Democrats	P. Wilcock*	312	66.1	+11.3
Conservative	R. Homer	160	33.9	–11.3
Majority		152	32.2	+22.6
Turnout		472	56.2	+4.0
Registered electors		840		
Liberal Democrats hold		Swing	▲11.3	

=== Saffron Walden Audley ===
Saffron Walden Audley (2 seats)
Party	Candidate	Votes	%	±%
Liberal Democrats	M. Hibbs*	541	44.8	+7.8
Conservative	D. Miller*	475	39.4	–1.3
Conservative	A. Walters	424	35.1	+4.6
Liberal Democrats	N. Reed	351	29.1	–1.8
Independent	D. Stacey	258	21.4	N/A
Labour	J. Evans	167	13.8	–7.2
Labour	S. Lake	124	10.3	–8.5
Turnout		~1,206	46.1	–6.1
Registered electors		2,617		
Liberal Democrats hold				
Conservative hold				

=== Saffron Walden Castle ===
Saffron Walden Castle (2 seats)
Party	Candidate	Votes	%	±%
Conservative	R. O'Neill	411	33.9	+4.4
Labour	D. Cornell*	404	33.3	–9.0
Labour	P. Preece	395	32.5	+2.9
Conservative	J. Lupton	393	32.4	+9.0
Liberal Democrats	J. Porter*	385	31.7	–4.0
Liberal Democrats	R. Freeman	344	28.3	–3.5
Turnout		~1,214	40.6	–4.2
Registered electors		2,990		
Conservative gain from Liberal Democrats				
Labour hold				

=== Saffron Walden Plantation ===
Saffron Walden Plantation (2 seats)
Party	Candidate	Votes	%	±%
Conservative	A. Ketteridge	467	41.8	+10.3
Liberal Democrats	C. Bayley	393	35.2	+3.3
Conservative	C. Maran	374	33.5	+10.5
Liberal Democrats	S. Sault	364	32.6	+2.9
Labour	M. Green*	309	27.7	–13.0
Labour	Y. Morton*	246	22.0	–13.0
Turnout		~1,116	34.8	–7.1
Registered electors		3,207		
Conservative gain from Labour				
Liberal Democrats gain from Labour				

=== Saffron Walden Shire ===
Saffron Walden Shire (2 seats)
Party	Candidate	Votes	%	±%
Labour	R. Green*	444	49.7	–4.7
Conservative	R. Dean*	409	45.8	+12.8
Conservative	G. Maxwell	371	41.6	N/A
Liberal Democrats	R. Lefever	211	23.6	–3.6
Liberal Democrats	J. Dawson	180	20.2	–4.3
Turnout		~893	35.0	–13.8
Registered electors		2,551		
Labour hold				
Conservative hold				

=== Stansted Mountfitchet ===
Stansted Mountfitchet (3 seats)
Party	Candidate	Votes	%	±%
Liberal Democrats	R. Clifford*	845	58.0	+6.2
Liberal Democrats	A. Dean*	793	54.4	+3.4
Liberal Democrats	G. Sell*	768	52.7	+2.1
Conservative	B. Gott	594	40.8	+10.0
Conservative	W. Stiles	568	39.0	+12.1
Turnout		~1,457	33.6	–10.8
Registered electors		4,337		
Liberal Democrats hold				
Liberal Democrats hold				
Liberal Democrats hold				

=== Stebbing ===
Stebbing
Party	Candidate	Votes	%	±%
Liberal Democrats	C. Cant*	325	68.7	N/A
Conservative	M. Brackenbury	148	31.3	N/A
Majority		177	37.4	N/A
Turnout		473	38.8	N/A
Registered electors		1,223		
Liberal Democrats gain from Independent				

=== Stort Valley ===
Stort Valley
Party	Candidate	Votes	%	±%
Liberal Democrats	E. Hill	303	61.1	–10.0
Conservative	E. Oliver	193	38.9	+10.0
Majority		110	22.2	–20.0
Turnout		496	43.4	–11.8
Registered electors		1,144		
Liberal Democrats hold		Swing	▼10.0	

=== Takeley ===
Takeley (2 seats)
Party	Candidate	Votes	%	±%
Conservative	J. Cheetham*	497	70.3	+17.8
Conservative	D. Jones	416	58.9	+12.2
Liberal Democrats	L. Flawn	221	31.3	–9.8
Liberal Democrats	E. Jones	191	27.0	–13.5
Turnout		~707	30.3	–11.2
Registered electors		2,332		
Conservative hold				
Conservative hold				

=== Thaxted ===
Thaxted (2 seats)
Party	Candidate	Votes	%	±%
Independent	M. Caton*	653	54.3	+15.1
Liberal Democrats	M. Foley*	522	43.4	+7.1
Liberal Democrats	Y. De Bono	313	26.0	+0.8
Conservative	E. Walsh	289	24.0	–8.4
Independent	P. Leeder	196	16.3	–10.0
Conservative	B. Clark	196	16.3	N/A
Independent	T. Frostick	98	8.1	N/A
Turnout		~1,204	52.4	–2.0
Registered electors		2,297		
Independent hold				
Liberal Democrats hold				

=== The Canfields ===
The Canfields
Party	Candidate	Votes	%	±%
Independent	R. Smith*	336	77.2	N/A
Liberal Democrats	S. Robinson	99	22.8	–28.4
Majority		237	54.6	N/A
Turnout		435	30.2	–12.6
Registered electors		1,458		
Independent gain from Liberal Democrats				

=== The Chesterfords ===
The Chesterfords
Party	Candidate	Votes	%	±%
Conservative	G. Brown	290	53.8	–13.5
Liberal Democrats	E. Tealby-Watson	249	46.2	+13.5
Majority		41	7.6	–27.0
Turnout		539	41.2	–5.7
Registered electors		1,313		
Conservative hold		Swing	▼13.5	

=== The Eastons ===
The Eastons
Party	Candidate	Votes	%	±%
Conservative	C. Down	239	44.8	–2.7
Liberal Democrats	D. Bedding	208	39.0	+5.1
Labour	G. Murray	51	9.6	–9.0
Independent	L. Overy-Owen	36	6.7	N/A
Majority		31	5.8	–7.8
Turnout		534	48.7	–3.1
Registered electors		1,099		
Conservative hold		Swing	▼3.9	

=== The Rodings ===
The Rodings
Party	Candidate	Votes	%	±%
Conservative	S. Flack	304	51.9	+9.1
Liberal Democrats	F. Cummings*	282	48.1	–9.1
Majority		22	3.8	N/A
Turnout		586	57.2	+3.8
Registered electors		1,026		
Conservative gain from Liberal Democrats		Swing	▲9.1	

=== The Sampfords ===
The Sampfords
Party	Candidate	Votes	%	±%
Conservative	S. Schneider	289	52.8	+9.1
Liberal Democrats	D. Morgan	258	47.2	–9.1
Majority		31	5.6	N/A
Turnout		547	40.3	–9.5
Registered electors		1,369		
Conservative gain from Independent		Swing	▲9.1	

=== Wenden Lofts ===
Wenden Lofts
Party	Candidate	Votes	%	±%
Conservative	R. Chambers*	395	58.5	+0.1
Liberal Democrats	R. Harcourt	280	41.5	–0.1
Majority		115	17.0	+0.2
Turnout		675	56.0	+3.3
Registered electors		1,209		
Conservative hold		Swing	▲0.1	

=== Wimbish & Debden ===
Wimbish & Debden
Party	Candidate	Votes	%	±%
Independent	R. Stone*	374	72.2	+26.9
Liberal Democrats	G. Hallett	144	27.8	–4.8
Majority		230	44.4	+31.7
Turnout		518	43.3	–0.8
Registered electors		1,248		
Independent hold		Swing	▲15.9	

== By-elections ==
=== Stort Valley ===
Stort Valley by-election: 13 April 2000
Party	Candidate	Votes	%	±%
Liberal Democrats		311	55.7	
Conservative		247	44.3	
Majority		64	11.4	
Turnout		558	48.7	
Registered electors		1,146		
Liberal Democrats hold		Swing		

=== Birchanger ===
Birchanger by-election: 15 June 2000
Party	Candidate	Votes	%	±%
Conservative		346	76.7	
Liberal Democrats		105	23.3	
Majority		241	53.4	
Turnout		451	56.5	
Registered electors		798		
Conservative hold		Swing		

=== The Chesterfords ===
The Chesterfords by-election: 23 November 2000
Party	Candidate	Votes	%	±%
Liberal Democrats		443	59.6	
Conservative		300	40.4	
Majority		143	19.2	
Turnout		743	50.0	
Registered electors		1,486		
Liberal Democrats gain from Conservative		Swing		
