= 1991 Uttlesford District Council election =

1991 English local election

- 2 May 1991

All 42 seats to Uttlesford District Council 22 seats needed for a majority

	First party	Second party
Party	Conservative	Liberal Democrats
Last election	24 seats, 43.9%	10 seats, 39.7%
Seats won	25	10
Seat change	▲1	Steady
Popular vote	11,724	10,853
Percentage	39.9%	36.9%
Swing	▼4.0%	▼2.8%
	Third party	Fourth party
Party	Independent	Labour
Last election	7 seats, 16.7%	1 seat, 9.0%
Seats won	6	1
Seat change	▼1	Steady
Popular vote	2,478	4,326
Percentage	8.4%	14.7%
Swing	▲1.6%	▲5.7%
- Winner of each seat at the 1991 Uttlesford District Council election.
Council control before election
Conservative
Council control after election
Conservative

The 1991 Uttlesford District Council election took place on 2 May 1991 to elect members of Uttlesford District Council in England. This was on the same day as other local elections.

== Summary ==
=== Election result ===
1991 Uttlesford District Council election
Party	Candidates	Seats	Gains	Losses	Net gain/loss	Seats %	Votes %	Votes	+/−
Conservative	33	25	4	3	▲1	59.5	38.9	11,724	–5.0
Liberal Democrats	23	10	3	3	Steady	23.8	36.1	10,853	–3.2
Independent	12	6	1	2	▼1	14.3	10.6	3,201	+3.8
Labour	17	1	0	0	Steady	2.4	14.4	4,326	+5.0

== Ward results ==
Incumbent councillors standing for re-election are marked with an asterisk (*). Changes in seats do not take into account by-elections or defections.

=== Ashdon ===
Ashdon
Party	Candidate	Votes	%	±%
Independent	R. Tyler*	317	75.8	N/A
Labour	M. Green	101	24.2	N/A
Majority		216	51.6	N/A
Turnout		418	50.8	N/A
Registered electors		833		
Independent hold				

=== Birchanger ===
Birchanger
Party	Candidate	Votes	%	±%
Conservative	D. Haggerwood*	302	72.1	–11.4
Labour	K. Williams	117	27.9	N/A
Majority		185	44.2	–22.6
Turnout		419	53.1	–7.9
Registered electors		787		
Conservative hold				

=== Clavering ===
Clavering
Party	Candidate	Votes	%	±%
Independent	E. Abrahams*	Unopposed		
Registered electors		1,281		
Independent hold				

=== Elsenham ===
Elsenham
Party	Candidate	Votes	%	±%
Conservative	J. Hurwitz*	340	57.0	N/A
Liberal Democrats	A. White	158	26.5	N/A
Labour	M. Mott	98	16.4	N/A
Majority		182	30.5	N/A
Turnout		596	38.4	N/A
Registered electors		1,552		
Conservative hold				

=== Felsted ===
Felsted (2 seats)
Party	Candidate	Votes	%	±%
Liberal Democrats	D. Gregory	636	55.0	–21.1
Conservative	J. Berry-Richards	588	50.8	N/A
Liberal Democrats	R. Head	501	43.3	–9.1
Turnout		~1,157	53.2	+1.3
Registered electors		2,175		
Liberal Democrats hold				
Conservative gain from Liberal Democrats				

=== Great Dunmow North ===
Great Dunmow North (2 seats)
Party	Candidate	Votes	%	±%
Liberal Democrats	M. Gaylor	632	54.0	–4.3
Liberal Democrats	G. Powers	493	42.2	+6.9
Conservative	M. Davey*	385	32.9	–13.4
Conservative	R. Handy	377	32.2	+0.9
Labour	K. Blackburn	172	14.7	N/A
Turnout		~1,170	52.4	–2.4
Registered electors		2,232		
Liberal Democrats hold				
Liberal Democrats gain from Conservative				

=== Great Dunmow South ===
Great Dunmow South (2 seats)
Party	Candidate	Votes	%	±%
Conservative	D. Westcott*	816	59.6	–2.3
Liberal Democrats	N. Prowse*	575	42.0	–9.0
Conservative	D. James	566	41.3	N/A
Labour	D. Cole	305	22.3	N/A
Turnout		~1,370	47.8	–8.1
Registered electors		2,866		
Conservative hold				
Liberal Democrats hold				

=== Great Hallingbury ===
Great Hallingbury
Party	Candidate	Votes	%	±%
Independent	A. Streeter*	Unopposed		
Registered electors		752		
Independent hold				

=== Hatfield Broad Oak ===
Hatfield Broad Oak
Party	Candidate	Votes	%	±%
Conservative	R. Wood*	Unopposed		
Registered electors		888		
Conservative hold				

=== Hatfield Heath ===
Hatfield Heath
Party	Candidate	Votes	%	±%
Conservative	I. Delderfield*	324	64.7	–13.8
Labour	W. McCarthy	177	35.3	+13.8
Majority		147	29.4	–27.5
Turnout		501	44.7	–5.4
Registered electors		1,157		
Conservative hold		Swing	▼13.8	

=== Henham ===
Henham
Party	Candidate	Votes	%	±%
Conservative	F. Braeckman	326	49.5	–12.1
Liberal Democrats	J. Gibb	277	42.0	+3.6
Labour	J. Graddon	56	8.5	N/A
Majority		49	7.5	–15.6
Turnout		659	55.2	+9.6
Registered electors		1,202		
Conservative hold		Swing	▼7.9	

=== Little Hallingbury ===
Little Hallingbury
Party	Candidate	Votes	%	±%
Conservative	A. Row*	Unopposed		
Registered electors		1,091		
Conservative hold				

=== Littlebury ===
Littlebury
Party	Candidate	Votes	%	±%
Conservative	J. Menell*	Unopposed		
Registered electors		929		
Conservative hold				

=== Newport ===
Newport
Party	Candidate	Votes	%	±%
Conservative	S. Brockwell	483	62.4	+3.6
Liberal Democrats	P. Beer	291	37.6	+22.4
Majority		192	24.8	–7.9
Turnout		774	48.0	+0.3
Registered electors		1,641		
Conservative hold		Swing	▼9.4	

=== Rickling ===
Rickling
Party	Candidate	Votes	%	±%
Conservative	B. Smith	267	53.6	+7.7
Liberal Democrats	J. West	231	46.4	–7.7
Majority		36	7.2	N/A
Turnout		498	63.2	–3.9
Registered electors		791		
Conservative gain from Liberal Democrats		Swing	▲7.7	

=== Saffron Walden Audley ===
Saffron Walden Audley (2 seats)
Party	Candidate	Votes	%	±%
Liberal Democrats	J. Lefever	554	42.7	+8.4
Conservative	D. Miller*	554	42.7	–7.0
Conservative	A. Walters*	524	40.4	–5.6
Liberal Democrats	J. Porter	519	40.0	+6.8
Labour	J. Evans	184	14.2	–3.1
Labour	S. Lake	169	13.0	–1.5
Turnout		~1,296	57.6	–3.6
Registered electors		2,250		
Liberal Democrats gain from Conservative				
Conservative hold				

=== Saffron Walden Castle ===
Saffron Walden Castle (2 seats)
Party	Candidate	Votes	%	±%
Liberal Democrats	P. Paget*	652	43.9	+4.9
Liberal Democrats	K. Bigsby	518	34.9	–0.2
Labour	D. Cornell	449	30.2	+9.9
Conservative	R. Eastham*	446	30.0	–14.1
Labour	D. Barrs	409	27.5	+10.7
Conservative	B. Chandler	372	25.0	–12.2
Turnout		~1,485	52.7	–5.7
Registered electors		2,818		
Liberal Democrats gain from Conservative				
Liberal Democrats hold				

=== Saffron Walden Plantation ===
Saffron Walden Plantation (2 seats)
Party	Candidate	Votes	%	±%
Conservative	J. Ketteridge*	583	42.5	–7.1
Conservative	S. Neville*	495	36.1	–7.1
Labour	R. Bunn	358	26.1	+10.3
Labour	Y. Morton	356	25.9	+11.3
Liberal Democrats	V. Hunter	350	25.5	–12.6
Liberal Democrats	J. Drinkwater	346	25.2	–9.2
Turnout		~1,372	44.7	–5.7
Registered electors		3,070		
Conservative hold				
Conservative hold				

=== Saffron Walden Shire ===
Saffron Walden Shire (2 seats)
Party	Candidate	Votes	%	±%
Labour	R. Green*	628	57.7	+15.4
Conservative	R. Dean	398	36.5	–7.4
Liberal Democrats	P. Price-Smith	322	29.6	+4.8
Labour	K. Pipe	262	24.1	+3.0
Liberal Democrats	F. Whittington	259	23.8	+0.7
Turnout		~1,089	45.2	–8.6
Registered electors		2,410		
Labour hold				
Conservative hold				

=== Stansted Mountfitchet ===
Stansted Mountfitchet (3 seats)
Party	Candidate	Votes	%	±%
Liberal Democrats	A. Dean*	905	48.9	+0.2
Liberal Democrats	M. Caton*	850	45.9	–1.7
Liberal Democrats	R. Clifford*	828	44.7	±0.0
Conservative	B. Gott	773	41.7	–0.8
Independent	P. Wellings	723	39.0	N/A
Conservative	R. Wallace	722	39.0	–3.4
Turnout		~1,852	46.4	–6.6
Registered electors		1,124		
Liberal Democrats hold				
Liberal Democrats hold				
Liberal Democrats hold				

=== Stebbing ===
Stebbing
Party	Candidate	Votes	%	±%
Independent	M. Porter	344	53.3	N/A
Independent	E. Kiddle*	301	46.7	–30.9
Majority		43	6.6	N/A
Turnout		645	58.0	+0.3
Registered electors		1,124		
Independent gain from Independent				

=== Stort Valley ===
Stort Valley
Party	Candidate	Votes	%	±%
Conservative	D. Collins*	Unopposed		
Registered electors		1,040		
Conservative hold				

=== Takeley ===
Takeley (2 seats)
Party	Candidate	Votes	%	±%
Conservative	P. MacPhail*	412	45.5	–13.5
Conservative	J. Cheetham	382	42.2	–14.6
Liberal Democrats	J. Backus	304	33.6	N/A
Labour	J. Oliveira	302	33.4	–5.1
Turnout		~905	41.9	–0.1
Registered electors		2,160		
Conservative hold				
Conservative hold				

=== Thaxted ===
Thaxted (2 seats)
Party	Candidate	Votes	%	±%
Conservative	E. Walsh*	609	56.0	+17.2
Independent	P. Leeder*	460	42.3	–12.6
Liberal Democrats	S. Corke	367	33.8	–1.0
Labour	K. Donovan	183	16.8	N/A
Independent	D. Morgan	118	10.9	N/A
Independent	R. Morgan	91	8.4	N/A
Turnout		~1,087	52.3	–3.9
Registered electors		2,078		
Conservative gain from Independent				
Independent hold				

=== The Canfields ===
The Canfields
Party	Candidate	Votes	%	±%
Conservative	J. Wright*	Unopposed		
Registered electors		1,400		
Conservative hold				

=== The Chesterfords ===
The Chesterfords
Party	Candidate	Votes	%	±%
Conservative	A. Lightning*	Unopposed		
Registered electors		1,179		
Conservative gain from Liberal Democrats				

=== The Eastons ===
The Eastons
Party	Candidate	Votes	%	±%
Conservative	P. Thorburn	Unopposed		
Registered electors		1,032		
Conservative hold				

=== The Rodings ===
The Rodings
Party	Candidate	Votes	%	±%
Conservative	K. Tivendale*	Unopposed		
Registered electors		992		
Conservative hold				

=== The Sampfords ===
The Sampfords
Party	Candidate	Votes	%	±%
Independent	H. Hughes*	316	51.5	N/A
Independent	R. Lander	298	48.5	N/A
Majority		18	2.9	N/A
Turnout		614	47.5	N/A
Registered electors		1,297		
Independent hold				

=== Wenden Lofts ===
Wenden Lofts
Party	Candidate	Votes	%	±%
Conservative	R. Chambers*	369	56.4	N/A
Liberal Democrats	R. Harcourt	285	43.6	N/A
Majority		84	12.8	N/A
Turnout		654	58.9	N/A
Registered electors		1,110		
Conservative hold				

=== Wimbish & Debden ===
Wimbish & Debden
Party	Candidate	Votes	%	±%
Conservative	N. Belcher*	311	57.2	–18.2
Independent	R. Stone	233	42.8	N/A
Majority		78	14.4	–36.3
Turnout		544	49.1	–1.1
Registered electors		1,115		
Conservative hold				

== By-elections ==
=== Takeley ===
Takeley by-election: 12 March 1992
Party	Candidate	Votes	%	±%
Liberal Democrats		460	41.6	
Conservative		430	38.9	
Labour		215	19.5	
Majority		30	2.7	
Turnout		1,105	50.9	
Registered electors		2,171		
Liberal Democrats gain from Conservative		Swing		

=== The Rodings ===
The Rodings by-election: 19 November 1992
Party	Candidate	Votes	%	±%
Liberal Democrats		279	52.0	
Conservative		258	48.0	
Majority		21	3.9	
Turnout		537	54.1	
Registered electors		993		
Liberal Democrats gain from Conservative		Swing		

=== Saffron Walden Castle ===
Saffron Walden Castle by-election: 1 April 1993
Party	Candidate	Votes	%	±%
Liberal Democrats		472	36.8	
Conservative		436	34.0	
Labour		308	24.0	
Independent		66	5.1	
Majority		36	2.8	
Turnout		1,282	45.6	
Registered electors		2,811		
Liberal Democrats hold		Swing		

=== Saffron Walden Plantation ===
Saffron Walden Plantation by-election: 14 April 1994
Party	Candidate	Votes	%	±%
Liberal Democrats		611	46.0	
Conservative		369	27.8	
Labour		349	26.3	
Majority		242	18.2	
Turnout		1,329	42.9	
Registered electors		3,098		
Liberal Democrats gain from Conservative		Swing		
