= 1995 Uttlesford District Council election =

1995 English local election

- 4 May 1995

All 42 seats to Uttlesford District Council 22 seats needed for a majority

	First party	Second party
Party	Liberal Democrats	Conservative
Last election	10 seats, 36.9%	25 seats, 39.9%
Seats won	19	12
Seat change	▲9	▼13
Popular vote	15,329	11,451
Percentage	44.5%	33.3%
Swing	▲7.6%	▼6.6%
	Third party	Fourth party
Party	Independent	Labour
Last election	6 seats, 8.4%	1 seat, 14.7%
Seats won	7	4
Seat change	▲1	▲3
Popular vote	3,269	5,385
Percentage	6.6%	15.6%
Swing	▼1.8%	▲0.9%
- Winner of each seat at the 1995 Uttlesford District Council election.
Council control before election
Conservative
Council control after election
No overall control

The 1995 Uttlesford District Council election took place on 4 May 1995 to elect members of Uttlesford District Council in England. This was on the same day as other local elections.

== Summary ==
=== Election result ===
1995 Uttlesford District Council election
Party	Candidates	Seats	Gains	Losses	Net gain/loss	Seats %	Votes %	Votes	+/−
Liberal Democrats	37	19	10	1	▲9	45.2	44.5	15,329	+8.4
Conservative	34	12	0	13	▼13	28.6	33.3	11,451	–5.6
Independent	10	7	2	1	▲1	16.7	6.6	2,269	–4.0
Labour	17	4	3	0	▲3	9.5	15.6	5,385	+1.2

== Ward results ==
Incumbent councillors standing for re-election are marked with an asterisk (*). Changes in seats do not take into account by-elections or defections.

=== Ashdon ===
Ashdon
Party	Candidate	Votes	%	±%
Independent	B. Tyler*	269	61.0	–14.8
Labour	J. Saxton	172	39.0	+14.8
Majority		97	22.0	–29.6
Turnout		441	51.0	+0.2
Registered electors		866		
Independent hold		Swing	▼14.8	

=== Birchanger ===
Birchanger
Party	Candidate	Votes	%	±%
Conservative	D. Haggerwood*	181	50.7	–21.4
Labour	K. Williams	125	35.0	+7.1
Liberal Democrats	W. Ratcliffe	51	14.3	N/A
Majority		56	15.7	–28.5
Turnout		357	46.8	–6.3
Registered electors		765		
Conservative hold		Swing	▼14.3	

=== Clavering ===
Clavering
Party	Candidate	Votes	%	±%
Independent	E. Abrahams*	426	75.5	N/A
Liberal Democrats	N. Greenhalgh	138	24.5	N/A
Majority		288	51.1	N/A
Turnout		564	42.8	N/A
Registered electors		1,322		
Independent hold				

=== Elsenham ===
Elsenham
Party	Candidate	Votes	%	±%
Conservative	J. Hurwitz*	271	51.3	–5.7
Liberal Democrats	A. Asinya	257	48.7	+22.2
Majority		14	2.7	–27.8
Turnout		528	31.6	–6.8
Registered electors		1,692		
Conservative hold		Swing	▼14.0	

=== Felstead ===
Felsted (2 seats)
Party	Candidate	Votes	%	±%
Liberal Democrats	D. Gregory*	634	56.5	+1.5
Liberal Democrats	A. Thawley	542	48.3	+5.0
Conservative	J. Berry-Richards	525	46.8	–4.0
Turnout		~1,123	50.5	–2.7
Registered electors		2,223		
Liberal Democrats hold				
Liberal Democrats gain from Conservative				

=== Great Dunmow North ===
Great Dunmow North (2 seats)
Party	Candidate	Votes	%	±%
Liberal Democrats	M. Gayler*	660	54.2	+0.2
Liberal Democrats	G. Powers*	520	42.7	+0.5
Labour	D. Wright	343	28.2	+13.5
Conservative	J. Davey	296	24.3	–8.6
Conservative	C. Hicks	251	20.6	–11.6
Labour	N. Starkey	237	19.5	N/A
Turnout		~1,218	52.0	–0.4
Registered electors		2,342		
Liberal Democrats hold				
Liberal Democrats hold				

=== Great Dunmow South ===
Great Dunmow South (2 seats)
Party	Candidate	Votes	%	±%
Liberal Democrats	N. Prowse*	818	61.4	+19.4
Liberal Democrats	C. Little	802	60.2	N/A
Conservative	D. James	448	33.6	–26.0
Conservative	H. Rothwell	419	31.4	–9.9
Turnout		~1,333	40.8	–7.0
Registered electors		3,267		
Liberal Democrats hold				
Liberal Democrats gain from Conservative				

=== Great Hallingbury ===
Great Hallingbury
Party	Candidate	Votes	%	±%
Independent	A. Streeter*	Unopposed		
Registered electors		508		
Independent hold				

=== Hatfield Broad Oak ===
Hatfield Broad Oak
Party	Candidate	Votes	%	±%
Liberal Democrats	W. Bree	274	59.2	N/A
Conservative	R. Wood*	189	40.8	N/A
Majority		85	18.4	N/A
Turnout		463	51.8	N/A
Registered electors		909		
Liberal Democrats gain from Conservative				

=== Hatfield Heath ===
Hatfield Heath
Party	Candidate	Votes	%	±%
Conservative	I. Delderfield*	230	44.1	–20.6
Labour	W. McCarthy	228	43.8	+8.5
Liberal Democrats	N. Powers	63	12.1	N/A
Majority		2	0.4	–29.0
Turnout		521	42.3	–2.4
Registered electors		1,234		
Conservative hold		Swing	▼14.6	

=== Henham ===
Henham
Party	Candidate	Votes	%	±%
Liberal Democrats	D. Morson	346	51.9	+9.9
Conservative	F. Bareckman*	321	48.1	–1.4
Majority		25	3.7	N/A
Turnout		667	53.1	–2.1
Registered electors		1,272		
Liberal Democrats gain from Conservative		Swing	▲5.7	

=== Little Hallingbury ===
Little Hallingbury
Party	Candidate	Votes	%	±%
Conservative	A. Row*	280	64.7	N/A
Liberal Democrats	A. Taylor	153	35.3	N/A
Majority		127	29.4	N/A
Turnout		433	38.5	N/A
Registered electors		1,137		
Conservative hold				

=== Littlebury ===
Littlebury
Party	Candidate	Votes	%	±%
Conservative	J. Menell*	Unopposed		
Registered electors		973		
Conservative hold				

=== Newport ===
Newport
Party	Candidate	Votes	%	±%
Liberal Democrats	W. Bowker	417	50.2	+12.6
Conservative	T. Archer	281	33.8	–28.6
Labour	T. Williams	133	16.0	N/A
Majority		136	16.4	N/A
Turnout		831	50.5	+2.5
Registered electors		1,648		
Liberal Democrats gain from Conservative		Swing	▲20.6	

=== Rickling ===
Rickling
Party	Candidate	Votes	%	±%
Liberal Democrats	P. Wilcock	274	54.8	+8.4
Conservative	B. Smith*	226	45.2	–8.4
Majority		48	9.6	N/A
Turnout		500	52.2	–11.0
Registered electors		812		
Liberal Democrats gain from Conservative		Swing	▲8.4	

=== Saffron Walden Audley ===
Saffron Walden Audley (2 seats)
Party	Candidate	Votes	%	±%
Conservative	D. Miller*	506	40.7	–2.0
Liberal Democrats	M. Hibbs	461	37.0	–5.7
Liberal Democrats	J. Lefever*	385	30.9	–9.1
Conservative	A. Walters	380	30.5	–9.9
Labour	J. Evans	261	21.0	+6.8
Labour	S. Lake	234	18.8	+5.8
Independent	B. Hughes	127	10.2	N/A
Turnout		~1,244	52.2	–5.4
Registered electors		2,384		
Conservative hold				
Liberal Democrats hold				

=== Saffron Walden Castle ===
Saffron Walden Castle (2 seats)
Party	Candidate	Votes	%	±%
Labour	D. Cornell	550	42.3	+12.1
Liberal Democrats	M. Porter*	464	35.7	–8.2
Liberal Democrats	J. Lupton	414	31.8	–3.1
Labour	J. Scott	385	29.6	+2.1
Conservative	A. Batchelor	384	29.5	–0.5
Conservative	G. St Clair-Armstrong	304	23.4	–1.6
Turnout		~1,301	44.8	–7.9
Registered electors		2,905		
Labour gain from Liberal Democrats				
Liberal Democrats hold				

=== Saffron Walden Plantation ===
Saffron Walden Plantation (2 seats)
Party	Candidate	Votes	%	±%
Labour	M. Green	533	40.7	+14.6
Labour	Y. Mortin	458	35.0	+9.1
Liberal Democrats	F. Whittington*	418	31.9	+6.4
Conservative	J. Ketteridge*	413	31.5	–11.0
Liberal Democrats	C. Bayley	389	29.7	+4.5
Conservative	H. Veerman	301	23.0	–13.1
Turnout		~1,309	41.9	–2.8
Registered electors		3,125		
Labour gain from Conservative				
Labour gain from Conservative				

=== Saffron Walden Shire ===
Saffron Walden Shire (2 seats)
Party	Candidate	Votes	%	±%
Labour	R. Green*	670	54.4	–3.3
Conservative	R. Dean*	407	33.0	–3.5
Liberal Democrats	R. Lefever	390	31.7	+2.1
Labour	D. O'Sullivan	335	27.2	+3.1
Liberal Democrats	N. Reed	302	24.5	+0.7
Turnout		~1,232	48.8	+3.6
Registered electors		2,525		
Labour hold				
Conservative hold				

=== Stansted Mountfitchet ===
Stansted Mountfitchet (3 seats)
Party	Candidate	Votes	%	±%
Liberal Democrats	R. Clifford*	956	51.8	+2.9
Liberal Democrats	A. Dean*	941	51.0	+5.1
Liberal Democrats	M. Caton*	935	50.6	+5.9
Conservative	J. Salmon	569	30.8	–10.9
Conservative	B. Gott	497	26.9	–12.1
Labour	A. Pounds	491	26.6	N/A
Conservative	R. Wallace	456	24.7	N/A
Turnout		~1,847	44.4	–2.0
Registered electors		4,159		
Liberal Democrats hold				
Liberal Democrats hold				
Liberal Democrats hold				

=== Stebbing ===
Stebbing
Party	Candidate	Votes	%	±%
Independent	M. Porter*	Unopposed		
Registered electors		1,148		
Independent hold				

=== Stort Valley ===
Stort Valley
Party	Candidate	Votes	%	±%
Liberal Democrats	G. Preston	426	71.1	N/A
Conservative	G. McKee	173	28.9	N/A
Majority		253	42.2	N/A
Turnout		599	55.2	N/A
Registered electors		1,087		
Liberal Democrats gain from Conservative				

=== Takeley ===
Takeley (2 seats)
Party	Candidate	Votes	%	±%
Conservative	J. Cheetham*	478	52.5	+7.0
Conservative	J. Whitehead	425	46.7	+4.5
Liberal Democrats	M. Groves*	374	41.1	+7.5
Liberal Democrats	L. Flawn	369	40.5	N/A
Turnout		~910	41.5	–0.4
Registered electors		2,195		
Conservative hold				
Conservative hold				

=== Thaxted ===
Thaxted (2 seats)
Party	Candidate	Votes	%	±%
Independent	M. Caton	460	39.2	N/A
Liberal Democrats	M. Foley	426	36.3	+2.5
Conservative	E. Walsh*	380	32.4	–23.6
Independent	P. Leeder*	309	26.3	–16.0
Liberal Democrats	D. Morgan	296	25.2	N/A
Independent	R. Morgan	81	6.9	–1.5
Turnout		~1,174	54.4	+2.1
Registered electors		2,158		
Independent gain from Conservative				
Liberal Democrats gain from Independent				

=== The Canfields ===
The Canfields
Party	Candidate	Votes	%	±%
Liberal Democrats	R. Smith	309	51.2	N/A
Conservative	A. Wright*	295	48.8	N/A
Majority		14	2.4	N/A
Turnout		604	42.8	N/A
Registered electors		1,422		
Liberal Democrats gain from Conservative				

=== The Chesterfords ===
The Chesterfords
Party	Candidate	Votes	%	±%
Conservative	A. Lightning*	401	67.3	N/A
Liberal Democrats	P. Popper	195	32.7	N/A
Majority		206	34.6	N/A
Turnout		596	46.9	N/A
Registered electors		1,281		
Conservative hold				

=== The Eastons ===
The Eastons
Party	Candidate	Votes	%	±%
Conservative	N. Redcliffe	265	47.5	N/A
Liberal Democrats	W. Davey	189	33.9	N/A
Labour	G. Murray	104	18.6	N/A
Majority		76	13.6	N/A
Turnout		558	51.8	N/A
Registered electors		1,074		
Conservative hold				

=== The Rodings ===
The Rodings
Party	Candidate	Votes	%	±%
Liberal Democrats	F. Cummings*	306	57.2	N/A
Conservative	D. McGowan	229	42.8	N/A
Majority		77	14.4	N/A
Turnout		535	53.4	N/A
Registered electors		1,012		
Liberal Democrats gain from Conservative				

=== The Sampfords ===
The Sampfords
Party	Candidate	Votes	%	±%
Independent	B. Hughes*	339	51.4	–0.1
Conservative	R. Clement	321	48.6	N/A
Majority		18	2.8	–0.2
Turnout		660	49.8	+2.3
Registered electors		1,356		
Independent hold				

=== Wenden Lofts ===
Wenden Lofts
Party	Candidate	Votes	%	±%
Conservative	R. Chambers*	349	58.4	+2.0
Liberal Democrats	J. Drinkwater	249	41.6	–2.0
Majority		100	16.8	+4.0
Turnout		598	52.7	–6.2
Registered electors		1,139		
Conservative hold		Swing	▲2.0	

=== Wimbish & Debden ===
Wimbish & Debden
Party	Candidate	Votes	%	±%
Independent	R. Stone	258	45.3	+2.5
Liberal Democrats	J. Gibb	186	32.6	N/A
Labour	B. Lock	126	22.1	N/A
Majority		72	12.7	N/A
Turnout		570	44.1	–5.0
Registered electors		1,299		
Independent gain from Conservative				

== By-elections ==
=== Great Dunmow South ===
Great Dunmow South by-election: 26 June 1997
Party	Candidate	Votes	%	±%
Liberal Democrats		351	35.8	
Conservative		341	34.8	
Labour		207	21.1	
Independent		81	8.3	
Majority		10	1.0	
Turnout		980	30.0	
Registered electors		3,267		
Liberal Democrats hold		Swing		

=== Hatfield Broad Oak ===
Hatfield Broad Oak by-election: 03 July 1997
Party	Candidate	Votes	%	±%
Conservative		244	50.7	
Liberal Democrats		215	44.7	
Labour		22	4.6	
Majority		29	6.0	
Turnout		481	51.8	
Registered electors		929		
Conservative gain from Liberal Democrats		Swing		

=== The Sampfords ===
The Sampfords by-election: 25 September 1997
Party	Candidate	Votes	%	±%
Conservative		255	47.6	
Liberal Democrats		237	44.2	
Independent		44	8.2	
Majority		18	3.4	
Turnout		536	39.5	
Registered electors		1,357		
Conservative gain from Independent		Swing		

=== Stebbing ===
Stebbing by-election: 11 December 1997
Party	Candidate	Votes	%	±%
Liberal Democrats		271	52.6	
Conservative		139	27.0	
Independent		105	20.4	
Majority		132	25.6	
Turnout		515	42.1	
Registered electors		1,223		
Liberal Democrats gain from Independent		Swing		

=== Stansted Mountfitchet ===
Stansted Mountfitchet by-election: 07 May 1998
Party	Candidate	Votes	%	±%
Liberal Democrats		826	49.7	
Conservative		637	38.4	
Labour		198	11.9	
Majority		189	11.3	
Turnout		1,661	38.0	
Registered electors		4,371		
Liberal Democrats hold		Swing		
