= 2007 Uttlesford District Council election =

District Council election

- 3 May 2007

All 44 seats to Uttlesford District Council 23 seats needed for a majority

	First party	Second party	Third party
Party	Conservative	Liberal Democrats	Independent
Seats won	26	15	3
Seat change	▲16	▼16	Steady
Popular vote	23,849	18,683	1,587
Percentage	53.4%	41.8%	3.6%
Swing	▲14.0%	▼8.0%	▼2.3%
Council control before election
Liberal Democrats
Council control after election
Conservative

The 2007 Uttlesford District Council election took place on 3 May 2007 to elect members of Uttlesford District Council in Essex, England. This was on the same day as other local elections.

== Summary ==
=== Election result ===
2007 Uttlesford District Council election
Party	Candidates	Seats	Gains	Losses	Net gain/loss	Seats %	Votes %	Votes	+/−
Conservative	41	26	16	0	▲16	59.1	53.4	23,849	+14.0
Liberal Democrats	44	15	0	16	▼16	34.1	41.8	18,683	–8.0
Independent	6	3	0	0	Steady	6.8	3.6	1,587	–2.3
Labour	2	0	0	0	Steady	0.0	1.0	446	–3.7
UKIP	2	0	0	0	Steady	0.0	0.2	104	N/A

== Ward results ==
Incumbent councillors standing for re-election are marked with an asterisk (*). Changes in seats do not take into account by-elections or defections.

=== Ashdon ===
Ashdon
Party	Candidate	Votes	%	±%
Conservative	Rod Chamberlain	379	49.8	N/A
Liberal Democrats	Martin Savage*	342	44.9	–15.6
UKIP	Barry Tyler	40	5.3	N/A
Majority		37	4.9	N/A
Turnout		761	59.0	+14.1
Registered electors		1,294		
Conservative gain from Liberal Democrats				

=== Barnston & High Easter ===
Barnston & High Easter
Party	Candidate	Votes	%	±%
Conservative	Eric Hicks*	424	79.1	+18.1
Liberal Democrats	David Wills	112	20.9	–18.1
Majority		312	58.2	+36.2
Turnout		536	43.0	+1.8
Registered electors		1,251		
Conservative hold		Swing	▲18.1	

=== Birchanger ===
Birchanger
Party	Candidate	Votes	%	±%
Independent	Elizabeth Godwin*	292	90.7	+18.0
Liberal Democrats	Peter Deeks	30	9.3	+2.0
Majority		262	81.4	+28.7
Turnout		322	40.5	–4.8
Registered electors		796		
Independent hold		Swing	▲8.0	

=== Broad Oak & The Hallingburys ===
Broad Oak & The Hallingburys (2 seats)
Party	Candidate	Votes	%	±%
Conservative	Lesley Wells	831	75.8	+9.2
Conservative	Keith Artus*	818	74.7	+12.0
Liberal Democrats	Helen Baker	190	17.3	–12.3
Liberal Democrats	Melvin Caton	172	15.7	–11.7
Turnout		~1,096	40.7	+4.1
Registered electors		2,692		
Conservative hold				
Conservative hold				

=== Clavering ===
Clavering
Party	Candidate	Votes	%	±%
Independent	Eddie Abrahams*	455	93.4	+9.0
Liberal Democrats	Jo Dawson	32	6.6	–9.0
Majority		423	69.4	+18.0
Turnout		487	47.6	+10.9
Registered electors		1,144		
Independent hold		Swing	▲9.0	

=== Elsenham & Henham ===
Elsenham & Henham (2 seats)
Party	Candidate	Votes	%	±%
Liberal Democrats	Catherine Dean*	637	54.6	–2.4
Liberal Democrats	David Morson*	631	54.0	–2.9
Conservative	Ken Armstrong	463	39.7	+0.4
Conservative	Ray Gooding	428	36.7	+7.3
Turnout		~1,168	42.0	+8.1
Registered electors		2,780		
Liberal Democrats hold				
Liberal Democrats hold				

=== Felsted ===
Felsted (2 seats)
Party	Candidate	Votes	%	±%
Conservative	Elizabeth Bellingham-Smith	824	58.2	+20.5
Conservative	Ryan Sherer	740	52.2	+18.8
Liberal Democrats	David Gregory*	585	41.3	–19.2
Liberal Democrats	Alan Thawley*	554	39.1	–20.5
Turnout		~1,417	42.9	+8.7
Registered electors		3,303		
Conservative gain from Liberal Democrats				
Conservative gain from Liberal Democrats				

=== Great Dunmow North ===
Great Dunmow North (2 seats)
Party	Candidate	Votes	%	±%
Liberal Democrats	Mark Gayler*	474	54.4	–19.7
Liberal Democrats	Ron Clover	411	47.2	–16.3
Conservative	Keith Mackman	334	38.3	+14.3
Conservative	Heather Powell	309	35.5	+14.1
Independent	John Murphy	143	16.4	N/A
Turnout		~871	35.2	+4.0
Registered electors		2,475		
Liberal Democrats hold				
Liberal Democrats hold				

=== Great Dunmow South ===
Great Dunmow South (3 seats)
Party	Candidate	Votes	%	±%
Liberal Democrats	Emily Gower	733	51.3	–10.9
Conservative	Michael Miller	673	47.1	+10.0
Liberal Democrats	Clive Smith	669	46.8	–9.7
Conservative	Bob Fox	653	45.7	+10.4
Conservative	Ruth Wilson	632	44.2	+10.8
Liberal Democrats	Robert Wingard	615	43.0	–13.4
Turnout		~1,430	39.2	+9.8
Registered electors		3,647		
Liberal Democrats hold				
Conservative gain from Liberal Democrats				
Liberal Democrats hold				

=== Hatfield Heath ===
Hatfield Heath
Party	Candidate	Votes	%	±%
Independent	Mark Lemon*	424	88.5	+31.0
Liberal Democrats	Marion Dyer	55	11.5	+6.3
Majority		369	77.0	+56.7
Turnout		479	35.2	–1.9
Registered electors		1,365		
Independent hold		Swing	▲12.4	

=== Littlebury ===
Littlebury
Party	Candidate	Votes	%	±%
Conservative	Jan Menell*	510	86.1	+8.0
Liberal Democrats	Andrew Gregory	82	13.9	–8.0
Majority		428	72.3	+16.0
Turnout		592	47.4	+6.2
Registered electors		1,254		
Conservative hold		Swing	▲8.0	

=== Newport ===
Newport (2 seats)
Party	Candidate	Votes	%	±%
Liberal Democrats	Andrew Yarwood	745	56.0	–11.2
Liberal Democrats	Peter Wilcock	706	53.1	–13.8
Conservative	Oliver Dyball	537	40.4	+11.8
Conservative	Jeremy Rose	518	39.0	+11.9
Turnout		~1,330	51.6	+3.2
Registered electors		2,577		
Liberal Democrats hold				
Liberal Democrats hold				

=== Saffron Walden Audley ===
Saffron Walden Audley (3 seats)
Party	Candidate	Votes	%	±%
Conservative	Alastair Walters	830	49.1	+6.4
Conservative	Douglas Perry	796	47.1	+12.0
Conservative	Simon Howell	790	46.7	+15.0
Liberal Democrats	Michael Hibbs*	783	46.3	–11.4
Liberal Democrats	Keith Crook	631	37.3	–9.2
Liberal Democrats	Alan Groom	620	36.6	–7.9
Independent	John Cox	148	8.7	–2.6
Independent	John Bagley	125	7.4	N/A
Turnout		~1,692	45.1	+4.5
Registered electors		3,751		
Conservative gain from Liberal Democrats				
Conservative gain from Liberal Democrats				
Conservative gain from Liberal Democrats				

=== Saffron Walden Castle ===
Saffron Walden Castle (3 seats)
Party	Candidate	Votes	%	±%
Conservative	Sarfraz Anjum	723	47.4	+15.2
Conservative	Heather Mason	702	46.0	+14.7
Conservative	David-James Sadler	677	44.4	+14.2
Liberal Democrats	Richard Freeman*	597	39.1	–2.1
Liberal Democrats	Barbara Hughes*	542	35.5	–4.7
Liberal Democrats	Stephen Jones*	511	33.5	–4.5
Labour	Simon Trimnell	236	15.5	–16.3
Labour	Yvonne Morton	210	13.8	–7.6
Turnout		~1,526	41.8	+6.6
Registered electors		3,650		
Conservative gain from Liberal Democrats				
Conservative gain from Liberal Democrats				
Conservative gain from Liberal Democrats				

=== Saffron Walden Shire ===
Saffron Walden Shire (3 seats)
Party	Candidate	Votes	%	±%
Conservative	Jim Ketteridge*	965	61.3	+21.1
Conservative	Keith Eden	811	51.5	+21.3
Conservative	Howard Rolfe	753	47.9	+18.7
Liberal Democrats	Patrick Boland*	603	38.3	–4.3
Liberal Democrats	Sonia Sault	589	37.4	–1.4
Liberal Democrats	Elizabeth Jones	557	35.4	–1.2
Turnout		~1,574	38.4	+5.9
Registered electors		4,098		
Conservative hold				
Conservative gain from Liberal Democrats				
Conservative gain from Liberal Democrats				

=== Stansted North ===
Stansted North (2 seats)
Party	Candidate	Votes	%	±%
Conservative	John Salmon	663	50.1	+14.5
Liberal Democrats	Geoffrey Sell*	648	49.0	–6.3
Conservative	Jonathan Rich	632	47.8	+15.1
Liberal Democrats	Anne Marchant	597	45.1	–4.1
Turnout		~1,323	50.8	+9.4
Registered electors		2,605		
Conservative gain from Liberal Democrats				
Liberal Democrats hold				

=== Stansted South ===
Stansted South (2 seats)
Party	Candidate	Votes	%	±%
Liberal Democrats	Alan Dean*	403	54.9	–13.7
Liberal Democrats	John Hudson	324	44.2	–23.3
Conservative	Nick Church	283	38.6	+5.9
Conservative	Dick Shervington	262	35.7	+11.6
UKIP	John Patrick	64	8.7	N/A
Turnout		~734	33.2	+8.6
Registered electors		2,210		
Liberal Democrats hold				
Liberal Democrats hold				

=== Stebbing ===
Stebbing
Party	Candidate	Votes	%	±%
Liberal Democrats	Christina Cant*	330	51.9	–12.9
Conservative	Sandi Merifield	306	48.1	+12.9
Majority		24	3.8	–25.8
Turnout		636	51.9	+19.1
Registered electors		1,227		
Liberal Democrats hold		Swing	▼12.9	

=== Stort Valley ===
Stort Valley
Party	Candidate	Votes	%	±%
Liberal Democrats	Janice Loughlin*	331	52.9	–9.9
Conservative	Holly Fletcher	295	47.1	+9.9
Majority		36	5.8	–18.8
Turnout		626	53.1	+8.1
Registered electors		1,182		
Liberal Democrats hold		Swing	▼9.9	

=== Takeley & The Cranfields ===
Takeley & The Cranfields (2 seats)
Party	Candidate	Votes	%	±%
Conservative	Jackie Cheetham*	766	70.2	+24.2
Conservative	Derek Jones	647	59.3	+21.5
Liberal Democrats	Richard Harris	372	34.1	–12.6
Liberal Democrats	Paul Westlake	222	20.3	–20.3
Turnout		~1,091	42.6	±0.0
Registered electors		2,561		
Conservative hold				
Conservative gain from Liberal Democrats				

=== Thaxted ===
Thaxted (2 seats)
Party	Candidate	Votes	%	±%
Liberal Democrats	Martin Foley*	700	58.4	
Liberal Democrats	Antionette Wattebot*	580	48.4	
Conservative	Terry Frostick	531	44.3	
Conservative	Brian Smith	464	38.7	
Turnout		~1,199	46.8	
Registered electors		2,561		
Liberal Democrats hold				
Liberal Democrats hold				

=== The Chesterfords ===
The Chesterfords
Party	Candidate	Votes	%	±%
Conservative	Julie Redfern	468	61.7	+14.0
Liberal Democrats	Roger Harcourt	290	38.3	–14.0
Majority		178	23.4	N/A
Turnout		758	58.0	–4.5
Registered electors		1,309		
Conservative gain from Liberal Democrats		Swing	▲14.0	

=== The Eastons ===
The Eastons
Party	Candidate	Votes	%	±%
Conservative	Cecile Down*	399	80.6	+4.2
Liberal Democrats	Shirley Wilcock	96	19.4	–4.2
Majority		303	61.2	+8.4
Turnout		495	42.3	+5.4
Registered electors		1,173		
Conservative hold		Swing	▲4.2	

=== The Rodings ===
The Rodings
Party	Candidate	Votes	%	±%
Conservative	Susan Flack*	553	87.6	–1.9
Liberal Democrats	Duncan Sargeant	78	12.4	+1.9
Majority		475	75.2	–3.8
Turnout		631	45.4	–3.8
Registered electors		1,394		
Conservative hold		Swing	▼1.9	

=== The Sampfords ===
The Sampfords
Party	Candidate	Votes	%	±%
Conservative	Susan Schneider*	475	72.3	+11.2
Liberal Democrats	David Morgan	182	27.7	–11.2
Majority		293	44.6	+22.4
Turnout		657	45.9	+5.7
Registered electors		1,442		
Conservative hold		Swing	▲11.2	

=== Wenden Lofts ===
Wenden Lofts
Party	Candidate	Votes	%	±%
Conservative	Robert Chambers*	495	77.1	+6.5
Liberal Democrats	Neville Reed	147	22.9	–6.5
Majority		348	54.2	+13.0
Turnout		642	52.8	+5.1
Registered electors		1,225		
Conservative hold		Swing	▲6.5	

=== Wimbish & Debden ===
Wimbish & Debden
Party	Candidate	Votes	%	±%
Conservative	Tina Knight	490	73.7	N/A
Liberal Democrats	Ben Matthews	175	26.3	–32.6
Majority		315	47.4	N/A
Turnout		665	41.2	+5.8
Registered electors		1,623		
Conservative gain from Liberal Democrats				

== By-elections ==
Great Dunmow North By-Election 5 June 2008
Party	Candidate	Votes	%	±%
Conservative	John Davey	569	52.5	+17.4
Liberal Democrats	Julia Hirons	515	47.5	−2.3
Majority		54	5.0	
Turnout		1,084	42.0	
Conservative gain from Liberal Democrats		Swing		
