= 1983 Uttlesford District Council election =

1983 English local election

- 3 May 1983

All 42 seats to Uttlesford District Council 22 seats needed for a majority

	First party	Second party
Party	Conservative	Independent
Last election	28 seats, 53.5%	7 seats, 14.5%
Seats won	28	7
Seat change	Steady	Steady
Popular vote	11,634	3,684
Percentage	45.7%	14.5%
Swing	▼7.8%	0.0%
	Third party	Fourth party
Party	Alliance	Labour
Last election	3 seats, 6.5%	4 seats, 25.5%
Seats won	6	1
Seat change	▲3	▼3
Popular vote	5,960	4,194
Percentage	23.4%	16.5%
Swing	▲16.9%	▼9.0%
- Winner of each seat at the 1983 Uttlesford District Council election.
Council control before election
Conservative
Council control after election
Conservative

The 1983 Uttlesford District Council election took place on 3 May 1983 to elect members of Uttlesford District Council in England. This was on the same day as other local elections.

== Summary ==
=== Election result ===
1983 Uttlesford District Council election
Party	Candidates	Seats	Gains	Losses	Net gain/loss	Seats %	Votes %	Votes	+/−
Conservative	32	28	2	2	Steady	66.7	46.8	12,174	–7.9
Independent	10	7	2	2	Steady	16.7	14.2	3,684	+0.8
Alliance	17	6	3	0	▲3	14.3	22.9	5,960	+14.4
Labour	15	1	0	3	▼3	2.4	16.1	4,194	–7.3

== Ward results ==
Incumbent councillors standing for re-election are marked with an asterisk (*). Changes in seats do not take into account by-elections or defections.

=== Ashdon ===
Ashdon
Party	Candidate	Votes	%	±%
Independent	A. Ford	Unopposed		
Registered electors		811		
Independent gain from Labour				

=== Birchanger ===
Birchanger
Party	Candidate	Votes	%	±%
Conservative	D. Haggerwood*	Unopposed		
Registered electors		900		
Conservative hold				

=== Clavering ===
Clavering
Party	Candidate	Votes	%	±%
Independent	E. Abrahams*	Unopposed		
Registered electors		1,184		
Independent hold				

=== Elsenham ===
Elsenham
Party	Candidate	Votes	%	±%
Conservative	J. Hurwitz*	522	76.8	+8.3
Labour	L. Fordham	158	23.2	–8.3
Majority		364	53.4	+16.6
Turnout		680	50.3	–35.7
Registered electors		1,351		
Conservative hold		Swing	▲8.3	

=== Felsted ===
Felsted (2 seats)
Party	Candidate	Votes	%	±%
Alliance	R. Hawkins	706	61.3	N/A
Conservative	I. Chater	571	49.6	–4.7
Independent	J. Guthrie-Dow*	521	45.2	–8.3
Alliance	M. Page	426	37.0	N/A
Turnout		~1,152	53.4	–27.8
Registered electors		2,157		
Alliance gain from Independent				
Conservative hold				

=== Great Dunmow North ===
Great Dunmow North (2 seats)
Party	Candidate	Votes	%	±%
Alliance	R. Aldous	556	54.6	+1.9
Alliance	J. Garrett*	538	52.8	N/A
Conservative	R. Davey*	463	45.5	–2.1
Turnout		~1,018	51.5	–33.2
Registered electors		1,977		
Alliance gain from Conservative				
Alliance hold				

=== Great Dunmow South ===
Great Dunmow South (2 seats)
Party	Candidate	Votes	%	±%
Alliance	N. Prowse*	Unopposed		
Conservative	D. Westcott	Unopposed		
Registered electors		2,542		
Alliance hold				
Conservative hold				

=== Great Hallingbury ===
Great Hallingbury
Party	Candidate	Votes	%	±%
Independent	A. Streeter*	Unopposed		
Registered electors		708		
Independent hold				

=== Hatfield Broad Oak ===
Hatfield Broad Oak
Party	Candidate	Votes	%	±%
Conservative	D. Davies*	Unopposed		
Registered electors		877		
Conservative hold				

=== Hatfield Heath ===
Hatfield Heath
Party	Candidate	Votes	%	±%
Conservative	I. Delderfield*	369	65.2	–5.2
Labour	W. McCarthy	197	34.8	N/A
Majority		172	30.3	–10.5
Turnout		566	49.7	–29.2
Registered electors		1,139		
Conservative hold				

=== Henham ===
Henham
Party	Candidate	Votes	%	±%
Conservative	R. Glover*	354	60.5	–14.3
Alliance	J. Gibb	188	32.1	N/A
Labour	J. Graddon	43	7.4	–17.8
Majority		166	28.3	–21.1
Turnout		585	50.4	–28.2
Registered electors		1,161		
Conservative hold				

=== Little Hallingbury ===
Little Hallingbury
Party	Candidate	Votes	%	±%
Conservative	A. Row*	Unopposed		
Registered electors		1,071		
Conservative hold				

=== Littlebury ===
Littlebury
Party	Candidate	Votes	%	±%
Conservative	J. Menell*	Unopposed		
Registered electors		851		
Conservative hold				

=== Newport ===
Newport
Party	Candidate	Votes	%	±%
Conservative	H. Pugh*	513	66.8	N/A
Alliance	R. Fell	255	33.2	N/A
Majority		258	33.5	N/A
Turnout		768	51.2	N/A
Registered electors		1,499		
Conservative hold				

=== Rickling ===
Rickling
Party	Candidate	Votes	%	±%
Alliance	S. Collins	281	59.2	+4.6
Conservative	P. Wawn	194	40.8	–4.6
Majority		87	18.2	+9.1
Turnout		475	62.2	–19.9
Registered electors		764		
Alliance hold		Swing	▲4.6	

=== Saffron Walden Audley ===
Saffron Walden Audley (2 seats)
Party	Candidate	Votes	%	±%
Conservative	D. Miller*	773	53.7	–13.3
Conservative	A. Walters	604	41.9	–13.6
Alliance	A. Hibbs	394	27.3	N/A
Labour	R. Laidlaw	273	18.9	–13.2
Labour	A. Haywood	222	15.4	–13.4
Turnout		~1,441	67.1	–13.9
Registered electors		2,147		
Conservative hold				
Conservative hold				

=== Saffron Walden Castle ===
Saffron Walden Castle (2 seats)
Party	Candidate	Votes	%	±%
Conservative	R. Eastham	661	42.3	+2.3
Alliance	S. Scrivener	513	32.8	N/A
Conservative	P. Gould	459	29.3	–9.5
Labour	D. Cornell*	390	24.9	–33.6
Labour	W. Tritton	332	21.2	–21.1
Turnout		~1,564	67.1	–14.2
Registered electors		2,331		
Conservative gain from Labour				
Alliance gain from Labour				

=== Saffron Walden Plantation ===
Saffron Walden Plantation (2 seats)
Party	Candidate	Votes	%	±%
Conservative	A. Ketteridge*	773	53.2	–5.5
Conservative	S. Neville*	657	45.2	–8.8
Labour	D. Barrs	427	29.4	–5.3
Labour	A. Heywood	343	32.6	–9.6
Alliance	R. Jeffries	253	17.4	N/A
Alliance	K. Stevens	253	17.4	N/A
Turnout		~1,454	57.5	–24.4
Registered electors		2,529		
Conservative hold				
Conservative hold				

=== Saffron Walden Shire ===
Saffron Walden Shire (2 seats)
Party	Candidate	Votes	%	±%
Conservative	J. Stevens	565	38.6	–10.6
Labour	R. Green*	535	36.5	–18.0
Conservative	C. Flaxman	489	33.4	–10.1
Alliance	P. Paget	364	24.9	N/A
Labour	A. Flateau	199	13.6	–18.7
Turnout		~1,464	65.0	–14.8
Registered electors		2,253		
Conservative hold				
Labour hold				

=== Stansted Mountfitchet ===
Stansted Mountfitchet (3 seats)
Party	Candidate	Votes	%	±%
Independent	P. Clark*	1,261	57.3	–4.6
Conservative	B. Gott	1,037	47.1	–3.9
Conservative	S. Stiles*	997	45.3	+8.7
Alliance	W. Bree	656	29.8	–1.5
Turnout		~2,202	58.4	–23.8
Registered electors		3,770		
Independent hold				
Conservative hold				
Conservative hold				

=== Stebbing ===
Stebbing
Party	Candidate	Votes	%	±%
Independent	E. Kiddle*	486	79.5	–3.3
Alliance	G. Tobbell	125	20.5	N/A
Majority		361	59.0	–6.5
Turnout		611	56.9	–22.5
Registered electors		1,073		
Independent hold				

=== Stort Valley ===
Stort Valley
Party	Candidate	Votes	%	±%
Conservative	D. Collins*	Unopposed		
Registered electors		997		
Conservative hold				

=== Takeley ===
Takeley (2 seats)
Party	Candidate	Votes	%	±%
Conservative	P. MacPhail*	468	61.1	+0.6
Conservative	E. Whitehead*	462	60.3	+14.9
Labour	J. Oliveira	298	38.9	+1.8
Labour	R. Sendall	214	27.9	N/A
Turnout		~766	35.2	–39.3
Registered electors		2,176		
Conservative hold				
Conservative hold				

=== Thaxted ===
Thaxted (2 seats)
Party	Candidate	Votes	%	±%
Conservative	P. Leigh	894	83.1	+46.8
Independent	P. Leeder	380	35.3	N/A
Labour	H. Edwards	375	34.8	+5.0
Independent	M. Snow	307	28.5	+4.8
Independent	J. Craig	224	20.8	N/A
Labour	G. Walker	188	17.5	–8.2
Turnout		~1,076	56.4	–22.3
Registered electors		1,908		
Conservative hold				
Independent gain from Conservative				

=== The Canfields ===
The Canfields
Party	Candidate	Votes	%	±%
Conservative	J. Wright*	Unopposed		
Registered electors		1,312		
Conservative hold				

=== The Chesterfords ===
The Chesterfords
Party	Candidate	Votes	%	±%
Conservative	J. Moore*	Unopposed		
Registered electors		1,090		
Conservative hold				

=== The Eastons ===
The Eastons
Party	Candidate	Votes	%	±%
Conservative	E. Metson	Unopposed		
Registered electors		997		
Conservative hold				

=== The Rodings ===
The Rodings
Party	Candidate	Votes	%	±%
Conservative	K. Tivendale*	Unopposed		
Registered electors		939		
Conservative hold				

=== The Sampfords ===
The Sampfords
Party	Candidate	Votes	%	±%
Independent	H. Hughes*	505	79.0	N/A
Alliance	H. Nicholson	134	21.0	N/A
Majority		371	58.0	N/A
Turnout		639	52.0	N/A
Registered electors		1,230		
Independent hold				

=== Wenden Lofts ===
Wenden Lofts
Party	Candidate	Votes	%	±%
Conservative	R. Chambers	Unopposed		
Registered electors		1,029		
Conservative hold				

=== Wimbish & Debden ===
Wimbish & Debden
Party	Candidate	Votes	%	±%
Conservative	J. Tomblin	349	52.3	+10.3
Alliance	J. Pearson	318	47.7	N/A
Majority		31	4.5	N/A
Turnout		667	62.9	–21.0
Registered electors		1,061		
Conservative gain from Independent				
