= 1979 Uttlesford District Council election =

1979 English local election

- 3 May 1979

All 42 seats to Uttlesford District Council 22 seats needed for a majority

| | First party | Second party |
|---|---|---|
| Party | Conservative | Independent |
| Seats won | 28 | 7 |
| Seat change | ▼2 | ▲2 |
| Popular vote | 18,359 | 4,978 |
| Percentage | 53.5% | 14.5% |
| Swing | ▼2.0% | ▲6.9% |
| | Third party | Fourth party |
| Party | Labour | Liberal |
| Seats won | 4 | 3 |
| Seat change | ▲1 | ▼1 |
| Popular vote | 8,731 | 2,238 |
| Percentage | 25.5% | 6.5% |
| Swing | ▲5.4% | ▼10.3% |
- Winner of each seat at the 1979 Uttlesford District Council election.
Council control before election
Conservative
Council control after election
Conservative

The 1979 Uttlesford District Council election took place on 3 May 1979 to elect members of Uttlesford District Council in England. This was on the same day as other local elections.

== Summary ==
=== Election result ===
1979 Uttlesford District Council election
| Party | Candidates | Seats | Gains | Losses | Net gain/loss | Seats % | Votes % | Votes | +/− |
|---|---|---|---|---|---|---|---|---|---|
| Conservative | 37 | 28 | 2 | 4 | ▼2 | 66.7 | 54.7 | 20,381 | –0.8 |
| Independent | 11 | 7 | 4 | 2 | ▲2 | 16.7 | 13.4 | 4,978 | +5.8 |
| Labour | 17 | 4 | 1 | 0 | ▲1 | 9.5 | 23.4 | 8,731 | +3.6 |
| Liberal | 5 | 3 | 0 | 1 | ▼1 | 7.1 | 8.5 | 3,152 | –8.3 |

== Ward results ==
Incumbent councillors standing for re-election are marked with an asterisk (*). Changes in seats do not take into account by-elections or defections.

=== Ashdon ===
Ashdon
| Party | Candidate | Votes | % | ±% |
|---|---|---|---|---|
| Labour | L. Bartram | Unopposed | | |
| Registered electors | | 784 | | |
| Labour gain from Conservative | | | | |

=== Birchanger ===
Birchanger
| Party | Candidate | Votes | % | ±% |
|---|---|---|---|---|
| Conservative | D. Haggerman* | Unopposed | | |
| Registered electors | | 959 | | |
| Conservative hold | | | | |

=== Clavering ===
Clavering
| Party | Candidate | Votes | % | ±% |
|---|---|---|---|---|
| Independent | E. Abrahams* | Unopposed | | |
| Registered electors | | 1,124 | | |
| Independent gain from Conservative | | | | |

=== Elsenham ===
Elsenham
| Party | Candidate | Votes | % | ±% |
|---|---|---|---|---|
| Conservative | J. Hurwitz* | 688 | 68.5 | –0.5 |
| Labour | R. Shaw | 316 | 31.5 | +0.5 |
| Majority | | 372 | 37.0 | –1.0 |
| Turnout | | 1,004 | 86.0 | +25.7 |
| Registered electors | | 1,175 | | |
| Conservative hold | | Swing | ▼0.5 | |

=== Felsted ===
Felsted (2 seats)
| Party | Candidate | Votes | % | ±% |
|---|---|---|---|---|
| Conservative | B. Wooton | 927 | 54.3 | –5.9 |
| Independent | J. Guthrie-Dow | 914 | 53.5 | +7.5 |
| Conservative | C. Millington-Smith* | 823 | 48.2 | –6.0 |
| Turnout | | ~1,707 | 81.2 | +38.1 |
| Registered electors | | 2,102 | | |
| Conservative hold | | | | |
| Independent gain from Conservative | | | | |

=== Great Dunmow North ===
Great Dunmow North (2 seats)
| Party | Candidate | Votes | % | ±% |
|---|---|---|---|---|
| Liberal | J. Garrett* | 762 | 52.7 | –0.2 |
| Conservative | R. Davey* | 688 | 47.6 | –0.5 |
| Labour | H. Wright | 656 | 45.4 | –2.6 |
| Conservative | H. Martin | 345 | 23.9 | –2.5 |
| Turnout | | ~1,445 | 84.7 | +29.0 |
| Registered electors | | 1,706 | | |
| Liberal hold | | | | |
| Conservative hold | | | | |

=== Great Dunmow South ===
Great Dunmow South (2 seats)
| Party | Candidate | Votes | % | ±% |
|---|---|---|---|---|
| Conservative | J. Phillips | 1,157 | 62.7 | +5.0 |
| Liberal | N. Prowse* | 914 | 49.5 | –2.1 |
| Conservative | S. Hopkins* | 865 | 46.8 | –4.1 |
| Turnout | | ~1,847 | 77.3 | +36.0 |
| Registered electors | | 2,389 | | |
| Conservative hold | | | | |
| Liberal hold | | | | |

=== Great Hallingbury ===
Great Hallingbury
| Party | Candidate | Votes | % | ±% |
|---|---|---|---|---|
| Independent | A. Streeter* | Unopposed | | |
| Registered electors | | 651 | | |
| Independent hold | | | | |

=== Hatfield Broad Oak ===
Hatfield Broad Oak
| Party | Candidate | Votes | % | ±% |
|---|---|---|---|---|
| Conservative | D. Davies* | Unopposed | | |
| Registered electors | | 844 | | |
| Conservative hold | | | | |

=== Hatfield Heath ===
Hatfield Heath
| Party | Candidate | Votes | % | ±% |
|---|---|---|---|---|
| Conservative | I. Delderfield* | 591 | 70.4 | +3.7 |
| Independent | R. Howard | 248 | 29.6 | N/A |
| Majority | | 343 | 40.8 | +7.6 |
| Turnout | | 839 | 78.9 | +26.2 |
| Registered electors | | 1,073 | | |
| Conservative hold | | | | |

=== Henham ===
Henham
| Party | Candidate | Votes | % | ±% |
|---|---|---|---|---|
| Conservative | R. Glover* | 643 | 74.8 | N/A |
| Labour | J. Graddon | 217 | 25.2 | N/A |
| Majority | | 426 | 49.4 | N/A |
| Turnout | | 860 | 78.6 | N/A |
| Registered electors | | 1,098 | | |
| Conservative hold | | | | |

=== Little Hallingbury ===
Little Hallingbury
| Party | Candidate | Votes | % | ±% |
|---|---|---|---|---|
| Conservative | A. Row* | Unopposed | | |
| Registered electors | | 1,025 | | |
| Conservative hold | | | | |

=== Littlebury ===
Littlebury
| Party | Candidate | Votes | % | ±% |
|---|---|---|---|---|
| Conservative | J. Menell* | Unopposed | | |
| Registered electors | | 789 | | |
| Conservative hold | | | | |

=== Newport ===
Newport
| Party | Candidate | Votes | % | ±% |
|---|---|---|---|---|
| Conservative | H. Pugh* | Unopposed | | |
| Registered electors | | 1,396 | | |
| Conservative hold | | | | |

=== Rickling ===
Rickling
| Party | Candidate | Votes | % | ±% |
|---|---|---|---|---|
| Liberal | D. Wraith* | 321 | 54.6 | +3.7 |
| Conservative | F. Clarke | 267 | 45.4 | –3.7 |
| Majority | | 54 | 9.1 | +7.3 |
| Turnout | | 588 | 82.1 | +15.2 |
| Registered electors | | 721 | | |
| Liberal hold | | Swing | ▲3.7 | |

=== Saffron Walden Audley ===
Saffron Walden Audley (2 seats)
| Party | Candidate | Votes | % | ±% |
|---|---|---|---|---|
| Conservative | D. Miller* | 1,138 | 67.0 | +8.7 |
| Conservative | J. Wright-Watson* | 944 | 55.5 | +12.7 |
| Labour | J. Evans | 545 | 32.1 | –7.6 |
| Labour | D. Barrs | 490 | 28.8 | +8.9 |
| Turnout | | ~1,699 | 81.0 | +27.3 |
| Registered electors | | 2,098 | | |
| Conservative hold | | | | |
| Conservative hold | | | | |

=== Saffron Walden Castle ===
Saffron Walden Castle (2 seats)
| Party | Candidate | Votes | % | ±% |
|---|---|---|---|---|
| Labour | P. Preece* | 911 | 58.5 | +1.4 |
| Labour | D. Cornell | 660 | 42.3 | +1.5 |
| Conservative | P. Hoare | 623 | 40.0 | +8.5 |
| Conservative | M. Jenkins | 604 | 38.8 | +10.6 |
| Turnout | | ~1,559 | 81.3 | +27.3 |
| Registered electors | | 1,917 | | |
| Labour hold | | | | |
| Labour hold | | | | |

=== Saffron Walden Plantation ===
Saffron Walden Plantation (2 seats)
| Party | Candidate | Votes | % | ±% |
|---|---|---|---|---|
| Conservative | A. Ketteridge | 988 | 58.7 | +1.1 |
| Conservative | S. Neville* | 909 | 54.0 | +10.2 |
| Labour | T. Bogie | 585 | 34.7 | –0.1 |
| Labour | D. Staff | 559 | 33.2 | +12.3 |
| Turnout | | ~1,684 | 81.9 | +37.7 |
| Registered electors | | 2,056 | | |
| Conservative hold | | | | |
| Conservative hold | | | | |

=== Saffron Walden Shire ===
Saffron Walden Shire (2 seats)
| Party | Candidate | Votes | % | ±% |
|---|---|---|---|---|
| Labour | R. Green* | 912 | 54.5 | +5.5 |
| Conservative | R. Eastham* | 823 | 49.2 | +4.1 |
| Conservative | C. Flaxham | 727 | 43.5 | +2.4 |
| Labour | K. Wilson | 540 | 32.3 | +7.3 |
| Turnout | | ~1,673 | 79.8 | +29.4 |
| Registered electors | | 2,096 | | |
| Labour hold | | | | |
| Conservative hold | | | | |

=== Stansted Mountfitchet ===
Stansted Mountfitchet (3 seats)
| Party | Candidate | Votes | % | ±% |
|---|---|---|---|---|
| Independent | P. Clark* | 1,838 | 61.9 | N/A |
| Conservative | P. Jones* | 1,515 | 51.0 | –7.9 |
| Conservative | W. Stiles | 1,085 | 36.6 | –19.6 |
| Conservative | J. Wallace-Jarvis | 1,043 | 36.1 | –10.0 |
| Liberal | R. Clifford | 930 | 31.3 | –28.3 |
| Labour | D. Richards | 489 | 16.5 | N/A |
| Labour | N. Kay | 466 | 15.7 | N/A |
| Turnout | | ~2,968 | 82.2 | +32.8 |
| Registered electors | | 3,611 | | |
| Independent gain from Liberal | | | | |
| Conservative hold | | | | |
| Conservative hold | | | | |

=== Stebbing ===
Stebbing
| Party | Candidate | Votes | % | ±% |
|---|---|---|---|---|
| Independent | E. Kiddle* | 670 | 82.8 | N/A |
| Independent | G. Leonard | 139 | 17.2 | N/A |
| Majority | | 531 | 65.5 | N/A |
| Turnout | | 809 | 79.4 | N/A |
| Registered electors | | 1,032 | | |
| Independent hold | | | | |

=== Stort Valley ===
Stort Valley
| Party | Candidate | Votes | % | ±% |
|---|---|---|---|---|
| Conservative | D. Collins* | Unopposed | | |
| Registered electors | | 976 | | |
| Conservative hold | | | | |

=== Takeley ===
Takeley (2 seats)
| Party | Candidate | Votes | % | ±% |
|---|---|---|---|---|
| Conservative | P. MacPhail* | 973 | 60.5 | N/A |
| Conservative | F. Whitehead | 731 | 45.4 | N/A |
| Labour | J. Oliveira | 597 | 37.1 | N/A |
| Turnout | | ~1,608 | 74.5 | N/A |
| Registered electors | | 2,159 | | |
| Conservative hold | | | | |
| Conservative gain from Independent | | | | |

=== Thaxted ===
Thaxted (2 seats)
| Party | Candidate | Votes | % | ±% |
|---|---|---|---|---|
| Conservative | P. Latchford* | 515 | 36.3 | –34.7 |
| Conservative | K. Norman | 426 | 30.0 | –27.6 |
| Labour | H. Edwards | 423 | 29.8 | –9.2 |
| Labour | G. Fraenkel | 365 | 25.7 | –0.1 |
| Independent | B. Coxshead | 359 | 25.3 | N/A |
| Independent | M. Snow | 336 | 23.7 | N/A |
| Liberal | M. Park | 225 | 15.9 | N/A |
| Turnout | | ~1,418 | 78.7 | +21.4 |
| Registered electors | | 1,802 | | |
| Conservative hold | | | | |
| Conservative hold | | | | |

=== The Canfields ===
The Canfields
| Party | Candidate | Votes | % | ±% |
|---|---|---|---|---|
| Conservative | J. Wright | Unopposed | | |
| Registered electors | | 1,240 | | |
| Conservative hold | | | | |

=== The Chesterfords ===
The Chesterfords
| Party | Candidate | Votes | % | ±% |
|---|---|---|---|---|
| Conservative | J. Moore* | Unopposed | | |
| Registered electors | | 1,049 | | |
| Conservative hold | | | | |

=== The Eastons ===
The Eastons
| Party | Candidate | Votes | % | ±% |
|---|---|---|---|---|
| Conservative | F. Askew* | Unopposed | | |
| Registered electors | | 925 | | |
| Conservative hold | | | | |

=== The Rodings ===
The Rodings
| Party | Candidate | Votes | % | ±% |
|---|---|---|---|---|
| Conservative | K. Tivendale* | Unopposed | | |
| Registered electors | | 908 | | |
| Conservative hold | | | | |

=== The Sampfords ===
The Sampfords
| Party | Candidate | Votes | % | ±% |
|---|---|---|---|---|
| Independent | B. Hughes* | Unopposed | | |
| Registered electors | | 1,145 | | |
| Independent hold | | | | |

=== Wenden Lofts ===
Wenden Lofts
| Party | Candidate | Votes | % | ±% |
|---|---|---|---|---|
| Conservative | B. Erith* | Unopposed | | |
| Registered electors | | 959 | | |
| Conservative gain from Independent | | | | |

=== Wimbish & Debden ===
Wimbish & Debden
| Party | Candidate | Votes | % | ±% |
|---|---|---|---|---|
| Independent | E. Mitchell | 474 | 58.0 | N/A |
| Conservative | J. Tomblin* | 343 | 42.0 | N/A |
| Majority | | 131 | 15.9 | N/A |
| Turnout | | 817 | 83.9 | N/A |
| Registered electors | | 977 | | |
| Independent gain from Conservative | | | | |
