= 1987 Uttlesford District Council election =

1987 English local election

- 7 May 1987

All 42 seats to Uttlesford District Council 22 seats needed for a majority

	First party	Second party
Party	Conservative	Alliance
Seats won	24	10
Seat change	▼4	▲4
Popular vote	13,628	12,196
Percentage	43.9%	39.3%
Swing	▼2.9%	▲16.4%
	Third party	Fourth party
Party	Independent	Labour
Seats won	7	1
Seat change	Steady	Steady
Popular vote	2,109	2,928
Percentage	6.8%	9.4%
Swing	▼7.4%	▼6.7%
- Winner of each seat at the 1987 Uttlesford District Council election.
Council control before election
Conservative
Council control after election
Conservative

The 1987 Uttlesford District Council election took place on 7 May 1987 to elect members of Uttlesford District Council in Essex, England. This was on the same day as other local elections.

== Summary ==
=== Election result ===
1987 Uttlesford District Council election
Party	Candidates	Seats	Gains	Losses	Net gain/loss	Seats %	Votes %	Votes	+/−
Conservative	32	24	1	5	▼4	57.1	43.9	13,628	–2.9
Alliance	25	10	5	1	▲4	23.8	39.3	12,196	+16.4
Independent	8	7	1	1	Steady	16.7	6.8	2,109	–7.4
Labour	11	1	0	0	Steady	2.4	9.4	2,928	–6.7
Green	1	0	0	0	Steady	0.0	0.6	199	N/A

== Ward results ==
Incumbent councillors standing for re-election are marked with an asterisk (*). Changes in seats do not take into account by-elections or defections.

=== Ashdon ===
Ashdon
Party	Candidate	Votes	%	±%
Independent	R. Tyler	Unopposed		
Registered electors		839		
Independent hold				

=== Birchanger ===
Birchanger
Party	Candidate	Votes	%	±%
Conservative	D. Haggerwood*	424	83.5	N/A
Alliance	C. Rowley	84	16.5	N/A
Majority		340	66.8	N/A
Turnout		508	61.0	N/A
Registered electors		842		
Conservative hold				

=== Clavering ===
Clavering
Party	Candidate	Votes	%	±%
Independent	E. Abrahams*	Unopposed		
Registered electors		1,245		
Independent hold				

=== Elsenham ===
Elsenham
Party	Candidate	Votes	%	±%
Conservative	J. Hurwitz*	Unopposed		
Registered electors		1,528		
Conservative hold				

=== Felsted ===
Felsted (2 seats)
Party	Candidate	Votes	%	±%
Alliance	R. Hawkins*	874	76.1	+14.8
Alliance	A. Harding	602	52.4	+15.4
Independent	J. Guthrie-Dow	545	47.5	+2.3
Turnout		~1,148	51.9	–1.5
Registered electors		2,212		
Alliance hold				
Alliance gain from Conservative				

=== Great Dunmow North ===
Great Dunmow North (2 seats)
Party	Candidate	Votes	%	±%
Alliance	R. Aldous*	718	58.3	+3.7
Conservative	M. Davey	571	46.3	+0.8
Alliance	P. Taylor	435	35.3	–17.5
Conservative	E. Hicks	386	31.3	N/A
Turnout		~1,232	54.8	+3.3
Registered electors		2,249		
Alliance hold				
Conservative gain from Alliance				

=== Great Dunmow South ===
Great Dunmow South (2 seats)
Party	Candidate	Votes	%	±%
Conservative	D. Westcott*	932	61.9	N/A
Alliance	N. Prowse*	769	51.0	N/A
Alliance	D. Briggs	579	38.4	N/A
Turnout		~1,507	55.9	N/A
Registered electors		2,695		
Conservative hold				
Alliance hold				

=== Great Hallingbury ===
Great Hallingbury
Party	Candidate	Votes	%	±%
Independent	A. Streeter*	Unopposed		
Registered electors		765		
Independent hold				

=== Hatfield Broad Oak ===
Hatfield Broad Oak
Party	Candidate	Votes	%	±%
Conservative	R. Wood	309	57.8	N/A
Alliance	W. Bree	226	42.2	N/A
Majority		83	15.4	N/A
Turnout		535	58.8	N/A
Registered electors		910		
Conservative hold				

=== Hatfield Heath ===
Hatfield Heath
Party	Candidate	Votes	%	±%
Conservative	I. Delderfield*	474	78.5	+13.3
Labour	W. McCarthy	130	21.5	–13.3
Majority		344	56.9	+26.6
Turnout		604	50.1	+0.4
Registered electors		1,205		
Conservative hold		Swing	▲13.3	

=== Henham ===
Henham
Party	Candidate	Votes	%	±%
Conservative	R. Glover*	342	61.6	+1.1
Alliance	J. Gibb	213	38.4	+6.3
Majority		129	23.1	–5.2
Turnout		555	45.6	–4.8
Registered electors		1,224		
Conservative hold		Swing	▼2.6	

=== Little Hallingbury ===
Little Hallingbury
Party	Candidate	Votes	%	±%
Conservative	A. Row*	Unopposed		
Registered electors		1,118		
Conservative hold				

=== Littlebury ===
Littlebury
Party	Candidate	Votes	%	±%
Conservative	J. Menell*	Unopposed		
Registered electors		913		
Conservative hold				

=== Newport ===
Newport
Party	Candidate	Votes	%	±%
Conservative	H. Pugh*	450	58.8	–8.0
Green	G. Hannah	199	26.0	N/A
Alliance	L. Blount	116	15.2	–18.0
Majority		251	32.7	–0.8
Turnout		765	47.7	–3.5
Registered electors		1,603		
Conservative hold				

=== Rickling ===
Rickling
Party	Candidate	Votes	%	±%
Alliance	S. Collins*	292	54.1	–5.1
Conservative	J. Rich	248	45.9	+5.1
Majority		44	8.2	–10.2
Turnout		540	67.1	+4.9
Registered electors		808		
Alliance hold		Swing	▼5.1	

=== Saffron Walden Audley ===
Saffron Walden Audley (2 seats)
Party	Candidate	Votes	%	±%
Conservative	D. Miller*	668	49.7	–4.0
Conservative	A. Walters*	618	46.0	+4.1
Alliance	S. Jones	461	34.3	+7.0
Alliance	A. Barnes	446	33.2	N/A
Labour	D. Baker	232	17.3	–1.6
Labour	V. Carter	195	14.5	–0.9
Turnout		~1,345	61.2	–5.9
Registered electors		2,197		
Conservative hold				
Conservative hold				

=== Saffron Walden Castle ===
Saffron Walden Castle (2 seats)
Party	Candidate	Votes	%	±%
Conservative	R. Eastham*	708	44.1	+1.8
Alliance	H. Free	626	39.0	+6.2
Conservative	R. Dean	597	37.2	+7.9
Alliance	S. McDermott	563	35.1	N/A
Labour	D. Cornell	326	20.3	–4.6
Labour	D. Barrs	269	16.8	–4.4
Turnout		~1,604	58.4	–8.7
Registered electors		2,746		
Conservative hold				
Alliance hold				

=== Saffron Walden Plantation ===
Saffron Walden Plantation (2 seats)
Party	Candidate	Votes	%	±%
Conservative	A. Ketteridge*	750	49.6	–3.6
Conservative	S. Neville*	654	43.2	–2.0
Alliance	J. Benson	577	38.1	+20.7
Alliance	V. Lelliott	520	34.4	+17.0
Labour	J. Evans	239	15.8	–13.6
Labour	D. O'Sullivan	221	14.6	–18.0
Turnout		~1,513	50.4	–7.1
Registered electors		3,002		
Conservative hold				
Conservative hold				

=== Saffron Walden Shire ===
Saffron Walden Shire (2 seats)
Party	Candidate	Votes	%	±%
Conservative	J. Stevens*	569	43.9	+5.3
Labour	R. Green*	548	42.3	+5.8
Conservative	J. Hughes	459	35.4	+2.0
Alliance	H. Baker	322	24.8	–0.1
Alliance	F. Whittington	300	23.1	N/A
Labour	K. Pipe	273	21.1	+7.5
Turnout		~1,297	53.8	–11.2
Registered electors		2,410		
Conservative hold				
Labour hold				

=== Stansted Mountfitchet ===
Stansted Mountfitchet (3 seats)
Party	Candidate	Votes	%	±%
Alliance	A. Dean	1,014	48.7	+18.9
Alliance	M. Caton	992	47.6	N/A
Alliance	R. Clifford	930	44.7	N/A
Conservative	J. Brown	884	42.5	–4.6
Conservative	B. Gott*	882	42.4	–2.9
Conservative	D. Butterfield	789	37.9	N/A
Turnout		~2,082	53.0	–5.4
Registered electors		3,929		
Alliance gain from Independent				
Alliance gain from Conservative				
Alliance gain from Conservative				

=== Stebbing ===
Stebbing
Party	Candidate	Votes	%	±%
Independent	E. Kiddle*	495	77.6	–1.9
Alliance	R. Head	143	22.4	+1.9
Majority		352	55.1	–3.8
Turnout		638	57.7	+0.8
Registered electors		1,114		
Independent hold		Swing	▼1.9	

=== Stort Valley ===
Stort Valley
Party	Candidate	Votes	%	±%
Conservative	D. Collins*	Unopposed		
Registered electors		1,018		
Conservative hold				

=== Takeley ===
Takeley (2 seats)
Party	Candidate	Votes	%	±%
Conservative	P. MacPhail*	543	59.0	–2.1
Conservative	E. Whitehead*	523	56.8	–3.5
Labour	J. Oliveira	355	38.5	–0.4
Turnout		~921	42.0	+6.8
Registered electors		2,193		
Conservative hold				
Conservative hold				

=== Thaxted ===
Thaxted (2 seats)
Party	Candidate	Votes	%	±%
Independent	P. Leeder*	621	54.9	+19.6
Independent	E. Walsh	448	39.6	N/A
Conservative	Q. Mould	439	38.8	–44.3
Alliance	S. Corke	394	34.8	N/A
Turnout		~1,132	56.2	–0.2
Registered electors		2,014		
Independent hold				
Independent gain from Conservative				

=== The Canfields ===
The Canfields
Party	Candidate	Votes	%	±%
Conservative	J. Wright*	Unopposed		
Registered electors		1,384		
Conservative hold				

=== The Chesterfords ===
The Chesterfords
Party	Candidate	Votes	%	±%
Alliance	P. Chater	Unopposed		
Registered electors		1,132		
Alliance gain from Conservative				

=== The Eastons ===
The Eastons
Party	Candidate	Votes	%	±%
Conservative	P. Thornburn	Unopposed		
Registered electors		1,069		
Conservative hold				

=== The Rodings ===
The Rodings
Party	Candidate	Votes	%	±%
Conservative	K. Tivendale*	Unopposed		
Registered electors		971		
Conservative hold				

=== The Sampfords ===
The Sampfords
Party	Candidate	Votes	%	±%
Independent	H. Hughes*	Unopposed		
Registered electors		1,315		
Independent hold				

=== Wenden Lofts ===
Wenden Lofts
Party	Candidate	Votes	%	±%
Conservative	R. Chambers	Unopposed		
Registered electors		1,100		
Conservative hold				

=== Wimbish & Debden ===
Wimbish & Debden
Party	Candidate	Votes	%	±%
Conservative	N. Belcher	429	75.4	+23.1
Labour	B. Lock	140	24.5	N/A
Majority		289	50.7	+46.2
Turnout		569	50.2	–12.7
Registered electors		1,146		
Conservative hold				

== By-elections ==
=== The Chesterfords ===
The Chesterfords by-election: 29 March 1990
Party	Candidate	Votes	%	±%
Conservative		471	72.6	
Liberal Democrats		178	27.4	
Majority		293	45.2	
Turnout		649	55.5	
Registered electors		1,169		
Conservative gain from Liberal Democrats		Swing		

=== Felsted ===
Felsted by-election: 26 April 1990
Party	Candidate	Votes	%	±%
Liberal Democrats		700	60.9	
Conservative		450	39.1	
Majority		250	21.8	
Turnout		1,150	52.6	
Registered electors		2,186		
Liberal Democrats hold		Swing		

=== Saffron Walden Castle ===
Saffron Walden Castle by-election: 9 May 1990
Party	Candidate	Votes	%	±%
Liberal Democrats		597	37.3	
Labour		510	31.9	
Conservative		494	30.9	
Majority		87	5.4	
Turnout		1,601	57.8	
Registered electors		2,770		
Liberal Democrats hold		Swing		
