= 1976 Uttlesford District Council election =

1976 English local election

- 6 May 1976

All 42 seats to Uttlesford District Council 22 seats needed for a majority

	First party	Second party	Third party
Party	Conservative	Independent	Liberal
Seats won	30	5	4
Seat change	▲8	▼5	▲2
Popular vote	12,621	1,727	3,812
Percentage	55.5%	7.6%	16.8%
Swing	▲10.9%	▼1.9%	▲9.9%
	Fourth party	Fifth party
Party	Labour	Ind. Conservative
Seats won	3	0
Seat change	▼4	▼1
Popular vote	4,504	N/A
Percentage	19.8%	N/A
Swing	▼19.2%	N/A
- Winner of each seat at the 1976 Uttlesford District Council election.
Council control before election
Conservative
Council control after election
Conservative

The 1976 Uttlesford District Council election took place on 6 May 1976 to elect members of Uttlesford District Council in Essex, England. This was on the same day as other local elections.

== Summary ==
=== Election result ===
1976 Uttlesford District Council election
Party	Candidates	Seats	Gains	Losses	Net gain/loss	Seats %	Votes %	Votes	+/−
Conservative	37	30	7	1	▲8	71.4	55.5	12,621	+10.9
Independent	10	5	0	4	▼5	11.9	7.6	1,727	–1.9
Liberal	9	4	1	0	▲2	9.5	16.8	3,812	+9.9
Labour	15	3	0	2	▼4	7.1	19.8	4,504	–19.2
Ind. Conservative	9	0	0	1	▼1	0.0	N/A	N/A	N/A

== Ward results ==
=== Ashdon ===
Ashdon
Party	Candidate	Votes	%	±%
Conservative	W. Johnstone	Unopposed		
Registered electors		738		
Conservative gain from Labour				

=== Birchanger ===
Birchanger
Party	Candidate	Votes	%	±%
Conservative	D. Haggerwood	Unopposed		
Registered electors		863		
Conservative hold				

=== Clavering ===
Clavering
Party	Candidate	Votes	%	±%
Conservative	E. Abrahams	Unopposed		
Registered electors		1,085		
Conservative gain from Ind. Conservative				

=== Elsenham ===
Elsenham
Party	Candidate	Votes	%	±%
Conservative	J. Hurwitz	360	69.0	+5.2
Labour	R. Shaw	162	31.0	–5.2
Majority		198	37.8	+5.2
Turnout		522	60.3	+3.6
Registered electors		873		
Conservative hold		Swing	▲5.2	

=== Felsted ===
Felsted (2 seats)
Party	Candidate	Votes	%	±%
Conservative	C. Millington-Smith	537	60.2	±0.0
Conservative	W. Wright	483	54.2	+11.7
Independent	J. Guthrie-Dow	410	46.0	+6.1
Turnout		~891	43.1	+16.3
Registered electors		2,068		
Conservative hold				
Conservative hold				

=== Great Dunmow North ===
Great Dunmow North (2 seats)
Party	Candidate	Votes	%
Liberal	J. Garrett	485	52.9
Conservative	R. Davey	441	48.1
Labour	D. Wright	440	48.0
Conservative	M. Ulph	242	26.4
Turnout		~917	55.7
Registered electors		1,647	
Liberal win (new seat)			
Conservative win (new seat)			

=== Great Dunmow South ===
Great Dunmow South (2 seats)
Party	Candidate	Votes	%
Conservative	S. Hopkins	543	57.7
Liberal	N. Prowse	485	51.6
Conservative	N. Howlett	479	50.9
Turnout		~941	41.3
Registered electors		2,278	
Conservative win (new seat)			
Liberal win (new seat)			

=== Great Hallingbury ===
Great Hallingbury
Party	Candidate	Votes	%	±%
Independent	A. Streeter	Unopposed		
Registered electors		673		
Independent hold				

=== Hatfield Broad Oak ===
Hatfield Broad Oak
Party	Candidate	Votes	%	±%
Conservative	D. Davies	332	65.7	+0.3
Labour	B. Clark	98	19.4	–15.2
Independent	R. Lumley	75	14.9	N/A
Majority		234	46.3	+15.9
Turnout		505	60.6	+16.1
Registered electors		834		
Conservative hold		Swing	▲7.8	

=== Hatfield Heath ===
Hatfield Heath
Party	Candidate	Votes	%	±%
Conservative	I. Delderfield	362	66.7	+16.3
Labour	R. Howard	181	33.3	–4.8
Majority		181	33.2	+21.0
Turnout		543	52.7	±0.0
Registered electors		1,053		
Conservative hold		Swing	▲10.6	

=== Henham ===
Henham
Party	Candidate	Votes	%	±%
Conservative	R. Glover	Unopposed		
Registered electors		1,059		
Conservative hold				

=== Little Hallingbury ===
Little Hallingbury
Party	Candidate	Votes	%	±%
Conservative	A. Row	268	51.7	N/A
Independent	M. Ardley	179	34.6	N/A
Liberal	J. Wilkinson	71	13.7	N/A
Majority		89	17.1	N/A
Turnout		518	53.0	N/A
Registered electors		980		
Conservative hold				

=== Littlebury ===
Littlebury
Party	Candidate	Votes	%	±%
Conservative	J. Menell	Unopposed		
Registered electors		697		
Conservative hold				

=== Newport ===
Newport
Party	Candidate	Votes	%	±%
Conservative	H. Pugh	Unopposed		
Registered electors		1,147		
Conservative hold				

=== Rickling ===
Rickling
Party	Candidate	Votes	%	±%
Liberal	D. Wraith	243	50.9	+19.0
Conservative	P. Wawn	234	49.1	+10.8
Majority		9	1.8	N/A
Turnout		477	66.9	+5.1
Registered electors		714		
Liberal gain from Conservative		Swing	▲4.1	

=== Saffron Walden Audley ===
Saffron Walden Audley (2 seats)
Party	Candidate	Votes	%
Conservative	D. Miller	657	58.3
Conservative	S. Sutton-Foster	482	42.8
Labour	D. Weaver	447	39.7
Independent	A. Sermon	263	23.3
Labour	A. Kemp	224	19.9
Turnout		~1,127	53.7
Registered electors		2,098	
Conservative win (new seat)			
Conservative win (new seat)			

=== Saffron Walden Castle ===
Saffron Walden Castle (2 seats)
Party	Candidate	Votes	%
Labour	P. Preece	570	57.1
Labour	J. Dowsett	407	40.8
Conservative	P. Hoare	314	31.5
Conservative	M. Agley	281	28.2
Liberal	S. Taylor	228	22.8
Turnout		~998	54.0
Registered electors		1,848	
Labour win (new seat)			
Labour win (new seat)			

=== Saffron Walden Plantation ===
Saffron Walden Plantation (2 seats)
Party	Candidate	Votes	%
Conservative	S. Neville	432	57.6
Conservative	D. Mensforth	328	43.8
Labour	K. Wilson	261	34.8
Liberal	W. Keep	168	22.4
Labour	J. Pratt	157	20.9
Turnout		~750	44.2
Registered electors		1,696	
Conservative win (new seat)			
Conservative win (new seat)			

=== Saffron Walden Shire ===
Saffron Walden Shire (2 seats)
Party	Candidate	Votes	%
Labour	R. Green	559	49.0
Conservative	R. Eastham	515	45.1
Conservative	D. Kingston	469	41.1
Liberal	G. Heathcock	340	29.8
Labour	J. Evans	285	25.0
Turnout		~1,141	50.4
Registered electors		2,264	
Labour win (new seat)			
Conservative win (new seat)			

=== Stansted Mountfitchet ===
Stansted Mountfitchet (3 seats)
Party	Candidate	Votes	%	±%
Liberal	P. Clark	1,023	59.6	+26.9
Conservative	P. Jones	1,011	58.9	+34.1
Conservative	G. Clarke	965	56.2	+34.7
Conservative	V. Mercer	774	45.1	+28.1
Liberal	R. Clifford	642	37.4	+19.9
Turnout		~1,718	49.4	–9.4
Registered electors		3,477		
Liberal hold				
Conservative hold				
Conservative gain from Labour				

=== Stebbing ===
Stebbing
Party	Candidate	Votes	%	±%
Independent	E. Kiddle	Unopposed		
Registered electors		970		
Independent hold				

=== Stort Valley ===
Stort Valley
Party	Candidate	Votes	%	±%
Conservative	D. Collins	Unopposed		
Registered electors		912		
Conservative hold				

=== Takeley ===
Takeley (2 seats)
Party	Candidate	Votes	%	±%
Independent	W. Dudgeon	Unopposed		
Conservative	P. MacPhail	Unopposed		
Registered electors		2,072		
Independent hold				
Conservative gain from Independent				

=== Thaxted ===
Thaxted (2 seats)
Party	Candidate	Votes	%	±%
Conservative	I. Barnard	707	71.0	N/A
Conservative	P. Latchford	573	57.6	N/A
Labour	G. Fraenkel	388	39.0	–1.7
Labour	A. Mussard	257	25.8	–4.3
Turnout		~995	57.3	+3.1
Registered electors		1,737		
Conservative gain from Independent				
Conservative gain from Independent				

=== The Canfields ===
The Cranfields
Party	Candidate	Votes	%	±%
Conservative	K. Fidler	486	66.3	+28.4
Independent	J. Chaplin	247	33.7	N/A
Majority		239	32.5	N/A
Turnout		733	59.8	+2.8
Registered electors		1,235		
Conservative gain from Independent				

=== The Chesterfords ===
The Chesterfords
Party	Candidate	Votes	%	±%
Conservative	J. Moore	Unopposed		
Registered electors		874		
Conservative hold				

=== The Eastons ===
The Eastons
Party	Candidate	Votes	%	±%
Conservative	G. Askew	346	63.6	–0.1
Liberal	A. Proudley	198	36.4	+0.1
Majority		148	27.1	–0.2
Turnout		544	62.7	+2.4
Registered electors		887		
Conservative hold		Swing	▼0.1	

=== The Rodings ===
The Rodings
Party	Candidate	Votes	%	±%
Conservative	K. Tivendale	Unopposed		
Registered electors		882		
Conservative hold				

=== The Sampfords ===
The Sampfords
Party	Candidate	Votes	%	±%
Independent	H. Hughes	553	89.0	+49.5
Labour	J. Smith	68	11.0	–0.9
Majority		485	78.0	+77.9
Turnout		621	55.5	–5.3
Registered electors		1,108		
Independent hold		Swing	▲25.2	

=== Wenden Lofts ===
Wenden Lofts
Party	Candidate	Votes	%	±%
Independent	B. Erith	Unopposed		
Registered electors		908		
Independent hold				

=== Wimbish & Debden ===
Wimbish & Debden
Party	Candidate	Votes	%	±%
Conservative	J. Tomblin	Unopposed		
Registered electors		957		
Conservative hold				
