= South East England Councils =

Voluntary association of council leaders

South East Councils
- Abbreviation: SEEC
- Predecessor: South East England Regional Assembly
- Formation: April 2009
- Location: Sevenoaks, Kent
- Region served: South East England
- Parent organisation: Local Government Association
- Website: www.secouncils.gov.uk

South East Councils (SEC) is a voluntary association of council leaders from the 70 local authorities in the South East region of England. It is a regional grouping affiliated to the Local Government Association. It was established following the abolition of the South East England Regional Assembly in March 2009. From April 2009 to 2010 it had a statutory role in regional planning.

== History ==
=== Regional planning ===
From 2009 the South East England Partnership Board of South East England Councils was responsible, in cooperation with the South East England Development Agency, for strategic planning in the region. This role as a local authority leaders' board was established by the Local Democracy, Economic Development and Construction Act 2009. This role ended in 2010 with the abolition of statutory regional planning in England.
