= 2023 Uttlesford District Council election =

2023 UK local government election

- 4 May 2023

All 39 seats to Uttlesford District Council 20 seats needed for a majority
	First party	Second party	Third party
Leader	Petrina Lees	George Smith	Melvin Caton
Party	R4U	Conservative	Liberal Democrats
Last election	26 seats, 38.3%	4 seats, 28.2%	7 seats, 22.5%
Seats before	23	6	5
Seats won	22	11	4
Seat change	▼1	▲5	▼1
Popular vote	17,098	14,447	6,910
Percentage	36.3%	30.7%	14.7%
Swing	▼2.0%	▲2.5%	▼7.8%
	Fourth party	Fifth party
Leader	Richard Pavitt	Paul Fairhurst
Party	Independent	Green
Last election	2 seats, 4.4%	0 seats, 2.7%
Seats before	2	3
Seats won	2	0
Seat change	Steady	▼3
Popular vote	2,119	2,211
Percentage	4.5%	4.7%
Swing	▼0.6%	▲2.0%
Leader before election
Petrina Lees
R4U
Leader after election
Petrina Lees
R4U

The 2023 Uttlesford District Council election took place on 4 May 2023 to elect members of Uttlesford District Council in Essex, England. This was on the same day as other local elections across England.

Prior to the election the residents' association 'Residents for Uttlesford' held a majority.

The election saw Residents for Uttlesford retain their majority. The Conservative and Liberal Democrat group leaders both lost their seats. The Greens lost all their seats on the council (the three seats it held prior to the election having all been councillors elected for Residents for Uttlesford but who later defected).

== Election results ==
2023 Uttlesford District Council election
Party	Candidates	Seats	Gains	Losses	Net gain/loss	Seats %	Votes %	Votes	+/−
R4U	32	22	2	6	▼4	56.4	36.3	17,098	–2.0
Conservative	38	11	7	0	▲7	28.2	30.7	14,447	+2.5
Liberal Democrats	27	4	1	4	▼3	10.3	14.7	6,910	–7.8
Independent	3	2	0	0	Steady	5.1	4.5	2,119	–0.6
Labour	23	0	0	0	Steady	0	8.7	4,114	+5.2
Green	13	0	0	0	Steady	0	4.7	2,211	+2.0
Reform	3	0	0	0	Steady	0	0.3	141	N/A

== Ward results ==
The results for each ward were as follows, with sitting councillors marked with an asterisk(*).

=== Ashdon ===
Ashdon
Party	Candidate	Votes	%	±%
Conservative	John Michael Moran	289	41.2	+6.3
R4U	James Leon Herman De Vries*	259	36.9	−4.6
Green	Paul Henry Allington	153	21.8	+11.6
Turnout		704	44.06	
Registered electors		1,598		
Conservative gain from R4U				

=== Broad Oak & The Hallingsburys ===
Broad Oak & The Hallingsburys
Party	Candidate	Votes	%	±%
R4U	Geof Driscoll*	643	51.5	+3.6
R4U	Neil Reeve*	583	46.7	+2.7
Conservative	Bob Church	442	35.4	+1.5
Conservative	Charlotte Dominique Salomon	419	33.6	+7.1
Liberal Democrats	Thomas Richards	159	12.7	+1.5
Reform	Malcolm Cameron Featherstone	55	4.4	N/A
Turnout		1,248	38.42	
Registered electors		3,248		
R4U hold				
R4U hold				

=== Clavering ===
Clavering
Party	Candidate	Votes	%	±%
Conservative	Edward Morgan Oliver*	493	59.7	+3.2
Green	Debra Anne Gold	198	24.0	N/A
Liberal Democrats	Alan Frank Barnes	135	16.3	−0.8
Turnout		831	44.44	
Registered electors		1,870		
Conservative hold		Swing		

=== Debden & Wimbish ===
Debden & Wimbish
Party	Candidate	Votes	%	±%
R4U	Stewart Charles Luck*	281	42.2	+1.5
Conservative	James William Noble	213	32.0	−0.5
Labour	Janet Elizabeth Grogan	74	11.1	+7.4
Liberal Democrats	Sylvia Jane Barrows	61	9.2	−9.6
Green	James Loxam Wilkinson	37	5.6	+1.2
Turnout		668	39.04	
Registered electors		1,711		
R4U hold		Swing		

=== Elsenham & Henham ===
Elsenham & Henham
Party	Candidate	Votes	%	±%
R4U	Petrina Michelle Lees*	690	53.9	−10.2
R4U	Bianca Maria Donald	483	37.7	−4.6
Liberal Democrats	Sarah Frances MacKay	288	22.5	−13.9
Conservative	Henry Edward Joseph Farrelly	254	19.8	+10.0
Conservative	Fraser James	193	15.1	N/A
Labour	Anna Katherine Mowbray	120	9.4	+3.9
Labour	Bob Burlton	117	9.1	N/A
Independent	Garry McKay LeCount*	106	8.3	−34.0
Green	Abi Saffrey	100	7.8	N/A
Turnout		1,283	34.80	
Registered electors		3,687		
R4U hold				
R4U hold				

Garry LeCount was a Residents for Uttlesford councillor until the election but was deselected as a candidate for re-election and stood as an independent instead.

=== Felsted & Stebbing ===
Felsted & Stebbing
Party	Candidate	Votes	%	±%
R4U	John Charles Evans*	498	37.8	−7.1
Liberal Democrats	Richard Silcock	487	37.0	+8.6
R4U	Sandi Merifield*	470	35.7	−10.2
Conservative	Grant Bailey	376	28.6	+4.2
Conservative	Jonathan Lee Botten	352	26.7	+6.3
Liberal Democrats	Frank Corr	310	23.6	+13.1
Turnout		1,318	37.29	
Registered electors		3,534		
R4U hold				
Liberal Democrats gain from R4U				

=== Flitch Green & Little Dunmow ===
Flitch Green & Little Dunmow
Party	Candidate	Votes	%	±%
Conservative	Christian Augusto Criscione*	352	61.8	+3.0
R4U	Liz Clark	101	17.7	−10.4
Liberal Democrats	Iris Janet Evans	60	10.5	−2.6
Green	Laura Fleur Thomas	57	10.0	N/A
Turnout		570	29.40	
Registered electors		1,939		
Conservative hold		Swing		

=== Great Dunmow North ===
Great Dunmow North
Party	Candidate	Votes	%	±%
R4U	Alex Armstrong*	528	43.3	−20.6
Conservative	John Edward Norris Davey	517	42.4	+11.4
Conservative	William Anthony Church	463	38.0	+14.1
R4U	Vincent David Clarke	368	30.2	−23.2
Labour	Tina Sham	165	13.5	N/A
Labour	William Stephen Bortey Annang	182	14.8	N/A
Liberal Democrats	Teddy Kimber	131	10.7	+1.4
Turnout		1,229	31.35	
Registered electors		3,920		
R4U hold				
Conservative gain from R4U				

=== Great Dunmow South & Barnston ===
Great Dunmow South & Barnston
Party	Candidate	Votes	%	±%
Conservative	Tom Loveday*	653	43.4	+10.3
Conservative	Chris Martin	613	40.7	+12.3
Conservative	Brian John Regan	562	37.3	+11.0
R4U	Rod Jones*	482	32.0	−26.8
R4U	Patrick Charles Lavelle*	477	31.7	−26.6
R4U	Kerry Ann Herbert	468	31.1	−20.9
Labour	Ben Cavanagh	278	18.5	N/A
Labour	Gerard William Darcy	257	17.1	+5.0
Labour	Christopher James Muir	224	14.9	N/A
Liberal Democrats	Philip Joseph Ronald Jones	174	11.6	N/A
Turnout		1,522	30.38	
Registered electors		5,010		
Conservative gain from R4U				
Conservative gain from R4U				
Conservative gain from R4U				

Seat recorded as three Conservative gains from Residents for Uttlesford to allow for comparison with the 2019 results. One of the seats had been won by Conservative Tom Loveday in a by-election in January 2023.

=== Hatfield Heath ===
Hatfield Heath
Party	Candidate	Votes	%	±%
Conservative	Mark Lemon*	410	71.8	−5.1
R4U	Tracy Louen Williams	161	28.2	N/A
Turnout		577	32.25	
Registered electors		1,789		
Conservative hold		Swing		

=== High Easter & The Rodings ===
High Easter & Rodings
Party	Candidate	Votes	%	±%
Conservative	Susan Barker*	479	70.0	−0.5
Green	Margaret Ann Shaw	115	16.8	+3.5
Labour	Faridah Mohamed Gullam	90	13.2	+7.2
Turnout		690	35.20	
Registered electors		1,960		
Conservative hold		Swing		

=== Littlebury, Chesterfords & Wendens Loft ===
Littlebury, Chesterfords & Wenden Lofts
Party	Candidate	Votes	%	±%
Independent	Neil Stephen Richard Gregory*	1,025	60.1	+3.1
Independent	Richard Stewart Leighton Pavitt*	988	57.9	+2.6
Conservative	Wazz Mughal	399	23.4	−2.5
Conservative	Sam Slota-Newsom	386	22.6	−2.8
Green	David Radford	213	12.5	−1.7
Liberal Democrats	Susan Roderick	196	11.5	−0.3
Turnout		1,709	48.37	
Registered electors		3,533		
Independent hold				
Independent hold				

=== Newport ===
Newport
Party	Candidate	Votes	%	±%
R4U	Judy Emmanuel*	795	61.6	−5.8
R4U	Neil Hargreaves*	785	60.8	−14.4
Conservative	Roger Hugh Beeching	320	24.8	+8.4
Liberal Democrats	Marion Elizabeth Dyer	214	16.6	+5.0
Green	Madeleine Margaret Radford	205	15.9	N/A
Turnout		1,293	40.06	
Registered electors		3,228		
R4U hold				
R4U hold				

=== Saffron Walden Audley ===
Saffron Walden Audley
Party	Candidate	Votes	%	±%
R4U	Arthur George Coote*	666	43.7	−1.3
R4U	Alex Reeve	648	42.5	−2.2
Labour	Cherry Ellen Parker	324	21.2	+12.0
Green	Barbara Ann Light*	302	19.8	−24.9
Conservative	Maria Pearson	293	19.2	+4.5
Conservative	Howard Stephen Rolfe	262	17.2	+3.4
Labour	Mat Braddy	223	14.6	N/A
Liberal Democrats	David Charles Perry	165	10.8	−24.5
Turnout		1,533	43.51	
Registered electors		3,523		
R4U hold				
R4U hold				

Arthur Coote represented Saffron Walden Shire ward before the election. Seats recorded as two Residents for Uttlesford holds to allow for comparison with 2019 results. One of the incumbent councillors, Barbara Light, had been elected as Residents for Uttlesford in 2019 but later that year joined the Greens instead.

=== Saffron Walden Castle ===
Saffron Walden Castle
Party	Candidate	Votes	%	±%
R4U	Heather Jane Asker*	771	56.1	+1.3
R4U	Richard Ford Freeman*	610	44.4	−5.3
Conservative	David James Sadler	246	17.9	+2.5
Labour	Simon David Trimnell	233	17.0	+9.0
Conservative	Simon Alexander Bagni	232	16.9	−2.5
Green	Edward Vernon Gildea	194	14.1	+4.4
Labour	John Gabriel Early	154	11.2	+4.8
Liberal Democrats	John Newman Lefever	119	8.7	−5.2
Reform	Grant John Maxwell St Clair-Armstrong	50	3.6	N/A
Turnout		1,383	38.47	
Registered electors		3,595		
R4U hold				
R4U hold				

=== Saffron Walden Shire ===
Saffron Walden Shire
Party	Candidate	Votes	%	±%
R4U	Jubeyuir Ahmed (Melon Ahmed)	879	42.1	−9.9
R4U	Chloe Louise Fiddy	876	41.9	−9.9
R4U	Daniel Ronald McBirnie	796	38.1	−12.1
Green	Paul Geoffrey Fairhurst*	470	22.5	−27.7
Conservative	Nick Osborne	457	21.9	+6.0
Conservative	David Jason Phipps	376	18.0	−3.9
Conservative	Adaeze Bowen	367	17.6	+1.4
Labour	Sally Ann Kaemer	336	16.1	+5.2
Labour	Andrew Mark Sampson	325	15.6	N/A
Liberal Democrats	Andrew John Baxter	308	14.7	+2.2
Liberal Democrats	Sonia Sault	301	14.4	−2.0
Liberal Democrats	Simon Maurice Ede	288	13.8	+2.0
Turnout		2,105	37.92	
Registered electors		5,551		
R4U hold				
R4U hold				
R4U hold				

Seats recorded as three Residents for Uttlesford holds to allow for comparison with 2019 results. One of the incumbent councillors, Paul Fairhurst, had been elected as Residents for Uttlesford in 2019 but later that year joined the Greens instead.

=== Stansted North ===
Stansted North
Party	Candidate	Votes	%	±%
Liberal Democrats	Alan Dean*	796	56.5	−4.2
Liberal Democrats	Geoffrey Sell*	773	54.8	−3.6
Conservative	Lois Patricia Prior	422	29.9	−2.5
Conservative	George Francis Peter Braeckman	421	29.9	−0.5
Labour	John Wadham	169	12.0	+5.8
Labour	Stuart Valentine Dodgson	151	10.7	+5.4
Turnout		1,417	39.12	
Registered electors		3,622		
Liberal Democrats hold				
Liberal Democrats hold				

=== Stansted South & Birchanger ===
Stansted South & Birchanger
Party	Candidate	Votes	%	±%
Conservative	Ray Gooding	480	43.0	+6.5
Conservative	Nick Church	421	37.8	+3.8
Liberal Democrats	Melvin Henry Caton*	396	35.5	−22.0
Liberal Democrats	Ayub Khan*	370	33.2	−15.2
Labour	Allen Macpherson	136	12.2	+3.7
R4U	Plaxy Budzinska	117	10.5	N/A
Labour	Thomas Albert Van de Bilt	88	7.9	+0.8
R4U	Jiri Wolker	86	7.7	N/A
Turnout		1,117	33.43	
Registered electors		3,341		
Conservative gain from Liberal Democrats				
Conservative gain from Liberal Democrats				

=== Stort Valley ===
Stort Valley
Party	Candidate	Votes	%	±%
Liberal Democrats	Janice Irene Loughlin*	366	57.6	−14.7
Conservative	Joel Alexander Cairns	176	27.7	±0.0
Labour	Sanjukta Ghosh	57	9.0	N/A
Reform	Neil Roddis	36	5.7	N/A
Turnout		635	38.98	
Registered electors		1,629		
Liberal Democrats hold		Swing		

=== Takeley ===
Takeley
Party	Candidate	Votes	%	±%
R4U	Geoff Bagnall*	630	47.8	−13.3
R4U	Maggie Sutton*	539	40.9	−19.2
R4U	Mark Andrew Coletta	477	36.2	−16.5
Conservative	Jeanne Eileen Bradley	466	35.3	+7.1
Conservative	Jim Gordon	381	28.9	−0.2
Conservative	Madhu Disanayake	303	23.0	+1.1
Liberal Democrats	Lorraine Anne Flawn	264	20.0	N/A
Labour	Tracey Elizabeth Roberts	195	14.8	+7.0
Liberal Democrats	Maryanne Craig Fleming	150	11.4	N/A
Labour	Olive Kumar Winters	133	10.1	N/A
Liberal Democrats	Paul Kevin Kimber	132	10.0	+0.8
Turnout		1,320	26.01	
Registered electors		5,074		
R4U hold				
R4U hold				
R4U hold				

=== Thaxted & The Eastons ===
Thaxted & The Eastons
Party	Candidate	Votes	%	±%
R4U	Martin Liam Foley*	893	64.1	−9.3
R4U	Richard Henry Haynes	694	49.8	N/A
Conservative	David Beverly	364	26.1	+4.4
Conservative	Andrew John Pryer	255	18.3	+0.1
Liberal Democrats	Antoinette Magdeleine Wattebot	121	8.7	−66.7
Labour	Alex Young	113	8.1	+3.5
Liberal Democrats	Patrick William O'Brien	102	7.3	−66.1
Green	Trilby Fiona Roberts	94	6.7	N/A
Turnout		1,395	35.24	
Registered electors		3,959		
R4U gain from Liberal Democrats				
R4U gain from Liberal Democrats				

Seats both recorded as Residents for Uttlesford gains from the Liberal Democrats to allow comparison with 2019 election. The two Liberal Democrats elected in 2019, Mike Tayler and Martin Foley, had both left the party in May 2020 and joined Residents for Uttlesford in March 2021.

=== The Sampfords ===
The Sampfords
Party	Candidate	Votes	%	±%
R4U	Mike Tayler*	344	42.9	−4.4
Conservative	George Maurice Smith*	340	42.4	+9.6
Green	Sarah Jane Heaton Allington	73	9.1	−1.8
Liberal Democrats	Mike Dyer	44	5.5	−3.5
Turnout		802	45.51	
Registered electors		1,766		
R4U hold		Swing		

Mike Tayler had been the incumbent for Thaxted & The Eastons ward before the election. Seat recorded as a Residents for Uttlesford hold to allow for comparison with the 2019 election, but George Smith had won the seat for the Conservatives in a by-election in 2021.

== Changes 2023–2027 ==
- In March 2025, councillor Heather Asker (Saffron Walden Castle), who had represented the ward since 2007, left Residents for Uttlesford to join Reform UK.

=== By-elections ===
==== Stort Valley ====
The by-election was triggered by the resignation of Liberal Democrat councillor Janice Loughlin, who described it as a "heartbreaking" decision to step down after 26 years as a councillor following a cancer diagnosis.

Stort Valley by-election: 25 June 2026
Party	Candidate	Votes	%	±%
Conservative	George Braeckmann	255	46.4	+18.7
Liberal Democrats	Paul Bamlett	175	31.9	−25.7
Reform	Philip Hoy	119	21.7	+16.0
Majority		80	11.0	N/A
Turnout		724		
Conservative gain from Liberal Democrats		Swing	▲27.2	

==== Great Dunmow North ====
The by-election was triggered by the death of Residents for Uttlesford councillor Alexander Armstrong on 12 May 2026; he had represented the ward since 2019 and served as vice-chair of the council from 2025.

Great Dunmow North by-election: 30 July 2026
Party	Candidate	Votes	%	±%
Conservative	Will Church	705	50.5	+11.9
Reform	Rod Jones	390	27.9	N/A
R4U	Sandi Merifield	138	9.9	−29.5
Labour	Oliver Rogers	126	9.0	−3.3
Liberal Democrats	Lorraine Flawn	37	2.7	−7.1
Majority		315	22.6	N/A
Turnout		1,396	28.8	−2.6
Registered electors		4,847		
Conservative gain from R4U				
