= Planning Aid Wales =

Town and country planning charity in Wales

- Founded: November 4, 1978
- Type: Legal advice
- Purpose: Providing information, advice and support to individuals and groups on the Town and country planning in Wales
- Location: Heath, Cardiff, Wales
- Coordinates: 51.502527°N 3.190011°W
- Region served: Wales
- Website: www.planningaidwales.org.uk

Planning Aid Wales (Welsh: Cymorth Cynllunio Cymru) is a registered charity that provides information, advice and support to individuals and groups on the town and country planning system and procedures in Wales. It was originally established in 1978 as part of the UK-wide Planning Aid system by the Royal Town Planning Institute, and is now partly funded by the Welsh Government.

== Organisation and funding ==
Planning Aid Wales is governed by a management board made up of fifteen trustee Directors, currently chaired by Gayle Wootton. The Chief Executive is James Davies.

In 2004, the Welsh Government granted the organisation £100,000 to expand its services. Carwyn Jones, then the Planning and Countryside Minister, said "involving individuals in the planning process in Wales is central to the Welsh Government's drive to make the planning system quicker, fairer and more transparent... Planning Aid Wales is playing a really important role in this drive to increase involvement, providing support and advice to members of the public and community groups dealing with planning issues."
