= 2019 Uttlesford District Council election =

2019 UK local government election

- 2 May 2019

All 39 seats to Uttlesford District Council 20 seats needed for a majority

	First party	Second party
Party	R4U	Liberal Democrats
Last election	9 seats, 24.7%	6 seats, 15.3%
Seats won	26	7
Seat change	▲17	▲1
Popular vote	20,460	10,692
Percentage	41.0%	21.4%
Swing	▲16.3%	▲6.1%
	Third party	Fourth party
Party	Conservative	Independent
Last election	23 seats, 44.0%	1 seat, 4.9%
Seats won	4	2
Seat change	▼19	▲1
Popular vote	13,396	2,084
Percentage	26.9%	4.2%
Swing	▼17.1%	▼0.7%
Council control before election
Conservative
Council control after election
R4U

The 2019 Uttlesford District Council election took place on 2 May 2019 to elect members of Uttlesford District Council in England. This was on the same day as other local elections.

== Summary ==
=== Election results ===
2019 Uttlesford District Council election
Party	Candidates	Seats	Gains	Losses	Net gain/loss	Seats %	Votes %	Votes	+/−
R4U	28	26	17	0	▲17	66.7	41.0	20,460	+16.3
Liberal Democrats	30	7	3	2	▲1	17.9	21.4	10,692	+6.1
Conservative	38	4	0	19	▼19	10.3	26.9	13,396	–17.1
Independent	2	2	1	0	▲1	5.1	4.2	2,084	–0.7
Labour	18	0	0	0	Steady	0.0	3.3	1,664	–3.9
Green	9	0	0	0	Steady	0.0	2.8	1,390	+1.8
UKIP	1	0	0	0	Steady	0.0	0.4	193	–2.6

== Ward results ==
=== Ashdon ===
Ashdon
Party	Candidate	Votes	%	±%
R4U	James Leon Herman De Vries	321	41.9	−1.7
Conservative	Howard Stephen Rolfe	278	36.3	−10.3
Green	Paul Henry Allington	72	9.4	New
Liberal Democrats	Sara Booth	59	7.7	New
Labour	Oliver James Rowley	36	4.7	New
Majority		43	5.6	
Turnout		774	49.1	
R4U gain from Conservative		Swing	4.3	

=== Broad Oak & The Hallingsburys ===
Broad Oak & The Hallingsburys
Party	Candidate	Votes	%	±%
R4U	Geof Driscoll	571	47.9	
R4U	Neil Reeve	524	44.0	
Conservative	Keith Artus	404	33.9	
Conservative	Lesley Wells	316	26.5	
UKIP	David Allum	193	16.2	
Liberal Democrats	Maryanne Fleming	133	11.2	
Turnout		1,197	37.7	
R4U gain from Conservative				
R4U gain from Conservative				

=== Clavering ===
Clavering
Party	Candidate	Votes	%	±%
Conservative	Edward Morgan Oliver	497	56.5	
R4U	Tracy Louen Williams	232	26.4	
Liberal Democrats	John Clift	150	17.1	
Majority		265	30.1	
Turnout		887	47.5	
Conservative hold		Swing		

=== Debden & Wimbish ===
Debden & Wimbish
Party	Candidate	Votes	%	±%
R4U	Stewart Charles Luck	307	40.7	
Conservative	Tina Patricia Knight	245	32.5	
Liberal Democrats	Alison Sarah Hare	142	18.8	
Green	Edward Vernon Gildea	33	4.4	
Labour	Peter Richard Donovan	28	3.7	
Majority		62	8.2	
Turnout		760	44.5	
R4U gain from Conservative		Swing		

=== Elsenham & Henham ===
Elsenham & Henham
Party	Candidate	Votes	%	±%
R4U	Petrina Lees	927	56.0	
R4U	Garry LeCount	612	37.0	
Liberal Democrats	Fred Frindle	526	31.8	
Liberal Democrats	David South	320	19.3	
Conservative	Liam Hithersay	142	8.6	
Labour	Callum Parris	79	4.8	
Turnout		1,655	40.1	
R4U gain from Liberal Democrats				
R4U gain from Liberal Democrats				

=== Felsted & Stebbing ===
Felsted & Stebbing
Party	Candidate	Votes	%	±%
R4U	Sandi Merifield	661	43.4	
R4U	John Evans	647	42.5	
Liberal Democrats	Richard Silcock	409	26.9	
Conservative	Roy Ramm	352	23.1	
Conservative	Charlotte Salomon	294	19.3	
Liberal Democrats	Antoinette Wattebot	152	10.0	
Green	Ruth Wheaton	96	6.3	
Labour	Humphrey Barbier	49	3.2	
Labour	David Sowter	46	3.0	
Turnout		1,522	38.8	
R4U gain from Conservative				
R4U gain from Conservative				

=== Flitch Green & Little Dunmow ===
Flitch Green & Little Dunmow
Party	Candidate	Votes	%	±%
Conservative	Christian Criscione	374	58.8	
R4U	Felicity Sutton	179	28.1	
Liberal Democrats	Steven Raddon	83	13.1	
Majority		195	30.7	
Turnout		639	31.8	
Conservative hold		Swing		

=== Great Dunmow North ===
Great Dunmow North
Party	Candidate	Votes	%	±%
R4U	Alexander Armstrong	779	62.3	
R4U	Louise Pepper	652	52.2	
Conservative	John Davey	378	30.2	
Conservative	Paul Davies	291	23.3	
Liberal Democrats	David Morgan	114	9.1	
Turnout		1,250	34.0	
R4U gain from Conservative				
R4U gain from Conservative				

=== Great Dunmow South & Barnston ===
Great Dunmow South & Barnston
Party	Candidate	Votes	%	±%
R4U	Rod Jones	978	58.8	
R4U	Patrick Lavelle	970	58.3	
R4U	Colin Day	865	52.0	
Conservative	Danielle Frost	551	33.1	
Conservative	Graham Barker	472	28.4	
Conservative	Vic Ranger	438	26.3	
Labour	Gerard Darcy	202	12.1	
Turnout		1,664	34.0	
R4U gain from Conservative				
R4U gain from Conservative				
R4U gain from Conservative				

=== Hatfield Heath ===
Hatfield Heath
Party	Candidate	Votes	%	±%
Conservative	Reginald Lemon	430	76.9	
Liberal Democrats	Michael Dyer	66	11.8	
Labour	Bill McCarthy	63	11.3	
Majority		364	65.1	
Turnout		569	34.4	
Conservative gain from Independent		Swing		

=== High Easter & Rodings ===
High Easter & Rodings
Party	Candidate	Votes	%	±%
Conservative	Susan Barker	483	70.5	
Green	Margaret Shaw	91	13.3	
Liberal Democrats	John Hudson	70	10.2	
Labour	Faridah Gullam	41	6.0	
Majority		392	57.2	
Turnout		694	36.9	
Conservative hold		Swing		

=== Littlebury, Chesterfords & Wenden Lofts ===
Littlebury, Chesterfords & Wenden Lofts
Party	Candidate	Votes	%	±%
Independent	Neil Gregory	1,057	52.9	
Independent	Richard Pavitt	1,027	51.4	
Conservative	Robert Chambers	481	24.1	
Conservative	Julie Redfern	471	23.6	
Green	Kevin Wing	263	13.2	
Liberal Democrats	Barbara Hughes	219	11.0	
Turnout		1,997	44.6	
Independent gain from Conservative				
Independent gain from Conservative				

=== Newport ===
Newport
Party	Candidate	Votes	%	±%
R4U	Neil Hargreaves	952	74.8	
R4U	Anthony Gerard	853	67.1	
Conservative	Gregory Smith	208	16.3	
Conservative	Tom Flack	199	15.6	
Liberal Democrats	Marion Dyer	147	11.5	
Turnout		1,273	41.4	
R4U hold		Swing		
R4U hold		Swing		

=== Saffron Walden Audley ===
Saffron Walden Audley
Party	Candidate	Votes	%	±%
R4U	Deryk Eke	744	43.6	
R4U	Barbara Light	740	43.4	
Liberal Democrats	Mike Hibbs	584	34.2	
Liberal Democrats	Simon Ede	261	15.3	
Conservative	George Smith	243	14.2	
Conservative	Sam Slota-Newson	228	13.4	
Green	Sarah Allington	226	13.2	
Labour	David Patrick O'Brien	152	8.9	
Turnout		1,707	37.1	
R4U hold		Swing		
R4U hold		Swing		

=== Saffron Walden Castle ===
Saffron Walden Castle
Party	Candidate	Votes	%	±%
R4U	Heather Jane Asker	818	53.6	
R4U	Richard Ford Freeman	742	48.7	
Conservative	Sam Goddard	289	19.0	
Conservative	David James Sadler	230	15.1	
Liberal Democrats	Steffi Suhr	209	13.7	
Liberal Democrats	John Newman Lefever	207	13.6	
Green	Abigail Saffrey	145	9.5	
Labour	Simon David Trimnell	119	7.8	
Labour	Laura Jane Snell	95	6.2	
Turnout		1,525	35.4	
R4U hold		Swing		
R4U hold		Swing		

=== Saffron Walden Shire ===
Saffron Walden Shire
Party	Candidate	Votes	%	±%
R4U	John Stuart Lodge	1,136	51.1	
R4U	Arthur George Coote	1,130	50.8	
R4U	Paul Geoffrey Fairhurst	1,096	49.3	
Conservative	Andrew James Ketteridge	478	21.5	
Green	Trilby Fiona Roberts	376	16.9	
Liberal Democrats	Sonia Sault	358	16.1	
Conservative	Karan Karunakaram	353	15.9	
Conservative	Nicholas David Osborne	348	15.6	
Liberal Democrats	Adam Peter Philip Langworthy	272	12.2	
Liberal Democrats	Sylvia Jane Barrows	258	11.6	
Labour	Yvonne Lily Morton	238	10.7	
Turnout		2,225	27.7	
R4U hold		Swing		
R4U hold		Swing		
R4U hold		Swing		

=== Stansted North ===
Stansted North
Party	Candidate	Votes	%	±%
Liberal Democrats	Alan Dean	905	59.8	
Liberal Democrats	Geoffrey Sell	871	57.5	
Conservative	Nick Church	484	32.0	
Conservative	Josie Thompson	453	29.9	
Labour	Joe Lewis	92	6.1	
Labour	Alfred Miti	79	5.2	
Turnout		1,514	43.0	
Liberal Democrats hold		Swing		
Liberal Democrats hold		Swing		

=== Stansted South & Birchanger ===
Stansted South & Birchanger
Party	Candidate	Votes	%	±%
Liberal Democrats	Melvin Caton	550	54.4	
Liberal Democrats	Ayub Khan	463	45.8	
Conservative	Gary Davey	349	34.5	
Conservative	Jennie Sutton	325	32.1	
Labour	Daniel Brett	81	8.0	
Labour	Thomas Van De Bilt	68	6.7	
Turnout		1,011	22.1	
Liberal Democrats gain from Conservative				
Liberal Democrats gain from Conservative				

=== Stort Valley ===
Stort Valley
Party	Candidate	Votes	%	±%
Liberal Democrats	Janice Loughlin	459	72.3	
Conservative	Daphne Wallace-Jarvis	176	27.7	
Majority		283	44.6	
Turnout		640	39.6	
Liberal Democrats hold		Swing		

=== Takeley ===
Takeley
Party	Candidate	Votes	%	±%
R4U	Geoff Bagnall	928	60.4	
R4U	Maggie Sutton	913	59.4	
R4U	Vere Isham	800	52.1	
Conservative	Jim Gordon	442	28.8	
Conservative	Derek Jones	428	27.9	
Conservative	Howard Ryles	332	21.6	
Liberal Democrats	Teddy Kimber	140	9.1	
Labour	Terry Brandon	119	7.7	
Turnout		1,536	25.1	
R4U gain from Conservative				
R4U gain from Conservative				
R4U gain from Conservative				

=== Thaxted & The Eastons ===
Thaxted & The Eastons
Party	Candidate	Votes	%	±%
Liberal Democrats	Mike Tayler	1,263	73.6	
Liberal Democrats	Martin Foley	1,229	71.6	
Conservative	Ralph Barrington	364	21.2	
Conservative	Marie Siddans	305	17.8	
Labour	Alex Young	77	4.5	
Turnout		1,717	42.7	
Liberal Democrats hold		Swing		
Liberal Democrats gain from Conservative				

=== The Sampfords ===
The Sampfords
Party	Candidate	Votes	%	±%
R4U	Alan Storah	383	47.3	
Conservative	William Burton	265	32.8	
Green	Emma Horton	88	10.9	
Liberal Democrats	Claire Vintiner	73	9.0	
Majority		118	14.6	
Turnout		807	45.9	
R4U gain from Conservative		Swing	7.3	

== Changes 2019–2023 ==
- In October 2019, councillors Anthony Gerard (Newport), Dr Barbara Light (Saffron Walden Audley) and Paul Fairhurst (Saffron Walden Shire) resigned from Residents for Uttlesford and defected to the Green Party, forming the first Green group on the council.
- In May 2021, councillor Vere Isham (Takeley) left Residents for Uttlesford to sit as an independent, before joining the Green Party; by May 2022 he was sitting as part of a joint Liberal Democrat and Green group.

=== By-elections ===
==== Newport ====
The by-election was triggered by the resignation of Green Party councillor Anthony Gerard, who had been elected for Residents for Uttlesford in May 2019 before defecting to the Greens in October 2019.

Newport by-election, 6 May 2021
Party	Candidate	Votes	%	±%
R4U	Judy Emanuel	892	63.7	
Conservative	Jennie Sutton	322	23.0	
Green	Edward Gildea	63	4.5	
Liberal Democrats	Thomas Smith	62	4.4	
Labour	Andrew Sampson	61	4.4	
Majority		570	40.7	
Turnout		1,400	45.0	
R4U hold		Swing		

==== The Sampfords ====
The by-election was triggered by the death of Residents for Uttlesford councillor Alan Storah.

The Sampfords by-election, 6 May 2021
Party	Candidate	Votes	%	±%
Conservative	George Smith	384	44.4	+11.6
R4U	Uli Gerhard	361	41.8	−5.5
Green	Madeleine Radford	52	6.0	−4.9
Labour	Sanjukta Ghosh	46	5.3	New
Liberal Democrats	Maryanne Fleming	21	2.4	−6.6
Majority		23	2.7	
Turnout		864	48.7	+2.8
Conservative gain from R4U		Swing	8.6	

==== Great Dunmow South & Barnston ====
The by-election was triggered by the resignation of Residents for Uttlesford councillor Colin Day.

Great Dunmow South & Barnston by-election, 5 January 2023
Party	Candidate	Votes	%	±%
Conservative	Tom Loveday	375	46.0	+14.2
R4U	Kerry Herbert	238	29.2	–27.3
Labour	Ben Cavanagh	115	14.1	+2.4
Liberal Democrats	Lorraine Flawn	88	10.8	New
Majority		137	16.8	N/A
Turnout		830	16.4	–17.6
Registered electors		5,048		
Conservative gain from R4U		Swing	20.8	
