= 2015 Uttlesford District Council election =

2015 local election in England

- 7 May 2015

All 39 seats to Uttlesford District Council 20 seats needed for a majority

	First party	Second party
Party	Conservative	R4U
Seats won	23	9
Seat change	▼10	▲9
Popular vote	34,593	19,456
Percentage	44.0%	24.7%
Swing	▼14.7%	N/A
	Third party	Fourth party
Party	Liberal Democrats	Independent
Seats won	6	1
Seat change	▼2	▼1
Popular vote	12,000	3,835
Percentage	15.3%	4.9%
Swing	▼16.0%	▲3.1%
Council control before election
Conservative
Council control after election
Conservative

The 2015 Uttlesford District Council election took place on 7 May 2015 to elect members of Uttlesford District Council in Essex, England. This was on the same day as other local elections.

== Summary ==
=== Election result ===
2015 Uttlesford District Council election
Party	Candidates	Seats	Gains	Losses	Net gain/loss	Seats %	Votes %	Votes	+/−
Conservative	39	23	0	10	▼11	59.0	44.0	34,593	–14.7
R4U	30	9	9	0	▲9	23.1	24.7	19,456	N/A
Liberal Democrats	25	6	2	1	▼2	15.4	15.3	12,000	–16.0
Independent	7	1	0	0	▼1	2.6	4.9	3,835	+3.1
Labour	23	0	0	0	Steady	0.0	7.2	5,644	–1.0
UKIP	6	0	0	0	Steady	0.0	3.0	2,331	+2.8
Green	3	0	0	0	Steady		1.0	807	N/A

== Ward results ==
Incumbent councillors standing for re-election are marked with an asterisk (*). Changes in seats do not take into account by-elections or defections.

=== Ashdon ===
Ashdon
Party	Candidate	Votes	%	±%
Conservative	Howard Rolfe*	575	46.6	–24.6
R4U	Daniel Starr	533	43.2	N/A
UKIP	Barry Tyler	125	10.1	N/A
Majority		42	3.4	–39.0
Turnout		1,233		
Conservative hold				

=== Broad Oak & The Hallingburys ===
Broad Oak & The Hallingburys (2 seats)
Party	Candidate	Votes	%	±%
Conservative	Keith Artus*	1,136	62.5	+2.8
Conservative	Lesley Wells	1,056	58.1	+0.9
UKIP	David Allum	586	32.3	N/A
Labour	Bill McCarthy	273	15.0	+2.7
R4U	Amanda Brown	228	12.5	N/A
Liberal Democrats	Mike Dyer	223	12.3	–1.7
R4U	Susan Tait	132	7.3	N/A
Turnout		~1,817		
Conservative hold				
Conservative hold				

=== Clavering ===
Clavering
Party	Candidate	Votes	%	±%
Conservative	Edward Oliver*	871	61.6	–18.5
R4U	Alan Storah	417	29.5	N/A
Liberal Democrats	Samantha Dunn	126	8.9	–11.0
Majority		454	32.1	–28.1
Turnout		1,414		
Conservative hold				

=== Debden & Wimbish ===
Debden & Wimbish
Party	Candidate	Votes	%	±%
Conservative	Tina Knight*	631	53.3	–12.8
R4U	Stewart Luck	338	28.6	N/A
Labour	Janet Grogan	111	9.4	–6.0
Liberal Democrats	Patrick O'Brien	103	8.7	–9.8
Majority		293	24.7	–22.9
Turnout		1,183		
Conservative hold				

=== Elsenham & Henham ===
Elsenham & Henham (2 seats)
Party	Candidate	Votes	%	±%
Liberal Democrats	Elizabeth Parr*	1,009	55.9	–1.0
Liberal Democrats	Rory Gleeson	912	50.5	–2.2
Independent	Petrina Lees	590	32.7	N/A
Conservative	Anthony Goodwin	445	24.6	–11.2
Conservative	Liam Hitersay	444	24.6	–1.4
Labour	Hilary Todd	110	6.1	–1.6
Labour	Lillian Adams	102	5.6	–0.1
Turnout		~1,806		
Liberal Democrats hold				
Liberal Democrats hold				

=== Felsted & Stebbing ===
Felsted & Stebbing (2 seats)
Party	Candidate	Votes	%
Conservative	Marie Felton	1,061	49.5
Conservative	Alan Mills	1,007	47.0
Independent	Richard Silcock	667	31.1
UKIP	Anna McNicoll	415	19.4
Liberal Democrats	Alan Thawley	311	14.5
UKIP	Alan Stannard	247	11.5
Labour	Humphrey Barbier	218	10.2
Labour	David Sowter	191	8.9
R4U	Grace Jackson	95	4.4
R4U	Tom Jackson	76	3.5
Turnout		~2,144	
Conservative win (new seat)			
Conservative win (new seat)			

=== Flitch Green & Little Dunmow ===
Flitch Green & Little Dunmow
Party	Candidate	Votes	%
Conservative	Stephanie Harris	727	63.3
R4U	Winnie Mustafa	243	21.2
Labour	Yad Zanganah	112	9.8
Liberal Democrats	Fran Richards	66	5.7
Majority		484	42.1
Turnout		1,148	
Conservative win (new seat)			

=== Great Dunmow North ===
Great Dunmow North (2 seats)
Party	Candidate	Votes	%	±%
Conservative	John Davey*	876	48.3	–14.0
Conservative	Paul Davies*	856	47.1	–10.6
R4U	Alexander Armstrong	795	43.8	N/A
R4U	Sue Gilbert	673	37.1	N/A
Labour	Coral Glennie	249	13.7	N/A
Liberal Democrats	David Morgan	182	10.0	–20.7
Turnout		~1,816		
Conservative hold				
Conservative hold				

=== Great Dunmow South & Barnston ===
Great Dunmow South & Barnston (3 seats)
Party	Candidate	Votes	%
Conservative	Graham Barker*	1,412	52.8
Conservative	Eric Hicks*	1,364	51.0
Conservative	Victoria Ranger*	1,273	47.6
R4U	Ian Brown	1,066	39.9
R4U	Keith Mackman	1,019	38.1
R4U	Milan Milovanovic	842	31.5
Labour	Gerard Darcy	379	14.2
Liberal Democrats	Maureen Caton	344	12.9
Labour	Duncan Sargeant	319	11.9
Turnout		~2,673	
Conservative win (new seat)			
Conservative win (new seat)			
Conservative win (new seat)			

=== Hatfield Heath ===
Hatfield Heath
Party	Candidate	Votes	%	±%
Independent	Mark Lemon*	599	48.4	–39.8
Conservative	Thomas Flack	571	46.2	N/A
Liberal Democrats	Juliet Richards	67	5.4	–6.4
Majority		28	2.2	–74.2
Turnout		1,237		
Independent hold				

=== High Easter & The Rodings ===
High Easter & The Rodings
Party	Candidate	Votes	%
Conservative	Susan Barker	974	74.1
R4U	Sandra Lloyd	205	15.6
Liberal Democrats	Iris Evans	135	10.3
Majority		769	58.5
Turnout		1,314	
Conservative win (new seat)			

=== Littlebury, Chesterford & Wenden Lofts ===
Littlebury, Chesterford & Wenden Lofts (2 seats)
Party	Candidate	Votes	%
Conservative	Julie Redfern*	1,020	43.1
Conservative	Robert Chambers*	984	41.6
Independent	Janet Menell*	850	35.9
Independent	Joanna Francis	564	23.8
R4U	Belinda Irons	524	22.1
R4U	Patrick Hawke-Smith	499	21.1
Labour	Philip Leighton	295	12.5
Turnout		~2,368	
Conservative win (new seat)			
Conservative win (new seat)			

=== Newport ===
Newport (2 seats)
Party	Candidate	Votes	%	±%
R4U	Joanna Parry	1,028	58.0	N/A
R4U	Neil Hargreaves	1,004	56.7	N/A
Conservative	Jeremy Rose*	624	35.2	–14.5
Conservative	John Moran	601	33.9	–9.5
Liberal Democrats	Marion Dyer	285	16.1	–31.0
Turnout		~1,771		
R4U gain from Conservative				
R4U gain from Liberal Democrats				

=== Saffron Walden Audley ===
Saffron Walden Audley (2 seats)
Party	Candidate	Votes	%	±%
R4U	Sharon Morris	880	39.1	N/A
R4U	Barbara Light	815	36.2	N/A
Liberal Democrats	Mike Hibbs	692	30.7	–11.3
Conservative	Douglas Perry*	657	29.2	–26.0
Conservative	Alastair Walters*	651	28.9	–23.7
Liberal Democrats	Hilary Shibata	290	12.9	–14.9
Labour	John Evans	204	9.1	–11.8
Green	Mary Sawtell	179	7.9	N/A
Labour	Dave O'Brien	137	6.1	–14.3
Turnout		~2,253		
R4U gain from Conservative				
R4U gain from Conservative				

=== Saffron Walden Castle ===
Saffron Walden Castle (2 seats)
Party	Candidate	Votes	%	±%
R4U	Heather Asker*	914	47.9	N/A
R4U	Richard Freeman	735	38.5	N/A
Conservative	Bob Eastham*	617	32.3	–16.1
Conservative	David Sadler*	559	29.3	–16.5
Labour	Arthur Coote	305	16.0	–9.6
Labour	Simon Trimnell	268	14.0	–8.5
Liberal Democrats	Barbara Hughes	233	12.2	–14.1
UKIP	Stephanie Law	188	9.8	N/A
Turnout		~1,910		
R4U gain from Conservative				
R4U gain from Conservative				

=== Saffron Walden Shire ===
Saffron Walden Shire (3 seats)
Party	Candidate	Votes	%	±%
R4U	John Lodge	1,624	52.0	N/A
R4U	Paul Fairhurst	1,346	43.1	N/A
R4U	Aisha Anjum	1,329	42.5	N/A
Conservative	Sandra Eden	1,064	34.0	–27.5
Conservative	Benjamin Balliger	1,010	32.3	–19.7
Conservative	Michael Nelson	978	31.3	–12.7
Labour	Yvonne Morton	505	16.2	–5.1
Green	Trilby Roberts	474	15.2	N/A
Liberal Democrats	Sonia Sault	453	14.5	–4.9
Labour	Adrian Williamson	353	11.3	–8.3
Independent	Patrick Boland	240	7.7	N/A
Turnout		~3,125		
R4U gain from Conservative				
R4U gain from Conservative				
R4U gain from Conservative				

=== The Sampfords ===
The Sampfords
Party	Candidate	Votes	%	±%
Conservative	Simon Howell*	814	62.0	–12.0
R4U	Sarfraz Anjum	274	20.9	N/A
Labour	Peter Donovan	124	9.5	N/A
Liberal Democrats	John Hudson	100	7.6	–18.4
Majority		540	41.1	–6.9
Turnout		1,312		
Conservative hold				

=== Stansted North ===
Stansted North (2 seats)
Party	Candidate	Votes	%	±%
Liberal Democrats	Alan Dean*	1,177	54.8	+11.6
Liberal Democrats	Geoffrey Sell	1,051	48.9	+13.3
Conservative	John Salmon*	998	46.5	–4.6
Conservative	Mike Clarke	761	35.4	–11.3
Labour	Ian Davies	310	14.4	+6.3
Turnout		~2,149		
Liberal Democrats gain from Conservative				
Liberal Democrats gain from Conservative				

=== Stansted South & Birchanger ===
Stansted South & Birchanger (2 seats)
Party	Candidate	Votes	%
Conservative	Terry Farthing	828	46.4
Conservative	Thom Goddard	756	42.4
Liberal Democrats	Melvin Caton	697	39.1
Liberal Democrats	Lori Flawn	500	28.0
Labour	John Wadham	265	14.9
R4U	Anthony Gerard	198	11.1
R4U	David Parry	168	9.4
Green	Karmel Stannard	154	8.6
Turnout		~1,783	
Conservative win (new seat)			
Conservative win (new seat)			

=== Stort Valley ===
Stort Valley
Party	Candidate	Votes	%	±%
Liberal Democrats	Janice Loughlin*	639	53.7	–2.6
Conservative	Alexis Beeching	551	46.3	+2.6
Majority		88	7.4	–5.2
Turnout		1,190		
Liberal Democrats hold		Swing	▼2.6	

=== Takeley ===
Takeley (3 seats)
Party	Candidate	Votes	%
Conservative	Jim Gordon	1,495	63.1
Conservative	Derek Jones*	1,384	58.5
Conservative	Howard Ryles	867	36.6
R4U	Natalie Sullivan	857	36.2
UKIP	Sharron Coker	770	32.5
R4U	Peter Emsden	599	25.3
Labour	Terry Brandon	426	18.0
Liberal Democrats	Paul Kimber	380	16.0
Independent	Geoff Bagnall	325	13.7
Turnout		~2,368	
Conservative win (new seat)			
Conservative win (new seat)			
Conservative win (new seat)			

=== Thaxted & The Eastons ===
Thaxted & The Eastons (2 seats)
Party	Candidate	Votes	%
Liberal Democrats	Martin Foley*	1,198	53.1
Conservative	John Freeman*	1,182	52.4
Conservative	Aaron Menuhin	913	40.5
Liberal Democrats	Antoinette Wattebot	827	36.7
Labour	Judith Pretty	231	10.2
Labour	Jon Spencer	157	7.0
Turnout		~2,254	
Liberal Democrats win (new seat)			
Conservative win (new seat)			

== By-elections ==
Elsenham and Henham By-Election 16 February 2017 (2 seats)
Party	Candidate	Votes	%	±%
R4U	Petrina Lees	834		
R4U	Garry LeCount	716		
Liberal Democrats	Sinead Holland	316		
Liberal Democrats	Lorraine Flawn	259		
Conservative	Joe Rich	141		
Conservative	Alexis Beeching	120		
UKIP	Sharron Coker	68		
UKIP	David Allum	64		
Labour	Hilary Todd	39		
Labour	Carl Steward	28		
Green	Paul Allington	8		
Green	Karmel Stannard	6		
R4U gain from Liberal Democrats		Swing		
R4U gain from Liberal Democrats		Swing		

Newport By-Election 4 May 2017
Party	Candidate	Votes	%	±%
R4U	Anthony Gerrard	623	46.9	−6.2
Conservative	Paul Simper	381	28.7	−3.5
Liberal Democrats	Jayne Pacey	325	24.5	+9.8
Majority		242	18.2	
Turnout		1,329		
R4U hold		Swing		
