= Planning Inspectorate =

Executive agency in England

Agency overview
- Jurisdiction: Government of the United Kingdom (England only)
- Headquarters: Temple Quay, Bristol
- Motto: Independent experts, inspiring confidence and shaping exceptional communities, now and for future generations.
- Employees: 966 including 454 planning inspectors
- Minister responsible: Angela Rayner, Secretary of State for Housing, Communities and Local Government
- Agency executive: Graham Stallwood, Chief Executive
- Parent department: Ministry of Housing, Communities and Local Government
- Website: www.gov.uk/government/organisations/planning-inspectorate
- Applies to: England (all functions); Wales (NSIPs only); Scotland (cross-border NSIPs only) (Note: The NSIP regime only applies in Scotland in very limited circumstances; specifically, to cross-border oil or gas pipelines, not including pipelines constructed by a 'gas transporter', where one end of the pipeline is located in Scotland.)
- Relates to: Land-use planning in England
Other UK counterparts
- Northern Ireland: Planning Appeals Commission
- Scotland: Planning and Environmental Appeals Division
- Wales: Planning and Environment Decisions Wales

The Planning Inspectorate (sometimes referred to as PINS) is an executive agency of the Ministry of Housing, Communities and Local Government of the UK Government with responsibility for making decisions and providing recommendations and advice on a range of land use planning-related issues across England. It also makes recommendations on nationally significant infrastructure projects (NSIPs) in Wales and cross-border projects in Scotland.

== History ==
The Planning Inspectorate traces its roots back to the Housing, Town Planning, &c. Act 1909 and the birth of the planning system in the UK. John Burns (1858–1943), the first member of the working class to become a government Minister, was President of the Local Government Board and responsible for the 1909 Housing Act. He appointed Thomas Adams (1871–1940) as Town Planning Assistant – a precursor to the current role of Chief Planning Inspector.

Subsequent Acts have included the Housing, Town Planning, &c. Act 1919, the Town Planning Act of 1925, and the Town and Country Planning Acts of 1932, 1947 and 1990.

Between 1977 and 2001 the inspectorate was based in Tollgate House, Bristol before moving to its current headquarters at Temple Quay House, Bristol.

The National Planning Policy Framework (Community Involvement) Bill 2013-14 proposed to abolish the Planning Inspectorate.

Changes to planning laws as a result of the Localism Act 2011 impacted the Planning Inspectorate, resulting in them being exposed to the consequences of top-down policy and local autonomy, according to academic research published in 2018.

On 9 May 2019, in a Written Statement, the Welsh Government signalled its intention to establish a separate, dedicated Planning Inspectorate for Wales due to the ongoing divergence of the regimes in England and Wales. On 1 October 2021, the staff and functions of Planning Inspectorate for Wales transferred back to the Welsh Government. The new division of Welsh Government is called Planning and Environment Decisions Wales (Welsh: Penderfyniadau Cynllunio ac Amgylchedd Cymru).

== Organisation and work ==
The Inspectorate is headquartered at Temple Quay House in Bristol.

The Inspectorate employs a full range of other professions found in similar organisations. Most of its Inspectors are salaried, but some are commercial contractors. Until about 2023 the commercial contractors were called Non-Salaried Inspectors (NSIs).

When deciding appeals, Planning Inspectors are appointed by the Secretary of State. For planning related appeals this authority comes from Schedule 6 to the Town and Country Planning Act 1990 and the Town and Country Planning (Determination of Appeals by Appointed Persons) (Prescribed Classes) Regulations 1997 (SI 1997/420). Planning related appeals mostly occur when local planning authorities refuse to grant planning permission, listed building consent, advertisement consent, permission for works to protected trees, lawful development certificates; or serve an enforcement notice requiring an alleged breach of planning control to end. The Town and Country Planning Act 1990 (as amended) is the primary legislation for the appeals system.

Applications for nationally significant infrastructure projects are considered by one independent inspector or a panel of five inspectors appointed to a formal Examining Authority. After considering the application, the Examining Authority makes a written recommendation to the relevant Secretary of State (e.g. Secretary of State for Transport for a road scheme), who then decides the application. The Planning Act 2008 (as amended) contains the consenting regime for nationally significant infrastructure projects.

The Local Plans system is covered by the Planning and Compulsory Purchase Act 2004. All local areas are expected to produce development plans. Inspectors examine those plans on behalf of the Secretary of State to ensure they meet legal tests and are consistent with national policy. They then report their findings to the council or other body that prepared the plan.

Frameworks established by related legislation cover other areas of work such as Compulsory Purchase Orders, applications in designated poorly performing local planning authorities, environmental appeals for the Environment Agency, public rights of way and commons casework for the Department for Environment, Food and Rural Affairs, and a range of highways and transport orders for the Department for Transport.

The Planning Inspectorate has three primary roles:

- to help communities shape where they live;
- to operate a fair and sustainable planning system; and
- to help meet future infrastructure needs.

=== Operational area ===
The Planning Inspectorate only has the responsibility for making decisions, and providing recommendations and advice, on a range of land use planning-related issues in England. However it also makes recommendations on nationally significant infrastructure projects (NSIPs) in Wales, and under very limited circumstances in Scotland for cross-border projects.

The other three bodies in the United Kingdom are:

- Planning and Environment Decisions Wales, for similar functions in Wales
- Planning and Environmental Appeals Division, for similar functions in Scotland
- Planning Appeals Commission, for similar functions in Northern Ireland

== Example decisions ==
- Planning Application Appeal Decision
- Compulsory Purchase Order Decision
