= Town and country planning in Wales =

Urban planning in Wales

Town and country planning in Wales is largely based on the land use planning system used in England. However, the system in Wales has some distinctive features which have arisen because substantial responsibility for town and country planning has been devolved to the Welsh Government. In particular, Wales now has a National Development Framework and Welsh Ministers have a duty under the Government of Wales Act 2006 to promote sustainable development.

== Overall planning policy in Wales ==
The context for planning policy in Wales is contained within two main documents, Planning Policy Wales, which provides guidance on the preparation and content of development plans and advice on development control decisions and appeals; and Minerals Planning Policy Wales, which gives guidance for the extraction of all minerals and other substances in, on or under land. Taken together with supporting documents, these cover the same broad areas as planning policy statements in England.

They are supplemented by a series of topic-based technical advice notes (TANs) and minerals technical advice notes (MTANs). Changes or updates to planning policy are issued in ministerial interim planning policy statements (MIPPs). Circular letters provide advice and guidance on specific topics.

== National government policies ==
=== Planning Guidance (Wales): Planning Policy ===
Before 1996, the Department for the Environment and the Welsh Office maintained a shared set of planning policy guidance. In 1996, the Welsh Office published its own set of bilingual guidance, broadly mirroring the guidance published by the Department for the Environment, under the shared planning law of England and Wales called Planning Guidance (Wales): Planning Policy.

The guidance included the requirement for local authorities to periodically assess the need for housing and the related need for building land.

The National Assembly of Wales determined that the Wales Spatial Plan should have powers equivalent to Planning Guidance (Wales): Planning Policy.

=== Wales Spatial Plan ===
The Wales Spatial Plan was the national spatial planning document for Wales, written by the Welsh Government and published by the National Assembly for Wales, under the Planning and Compulsory Purchase Act 2004. It was first published for Wales in 2004. It was updated in 2008.

Under the Wales Spatial Plan, Wales was divided into several regions and contained specific economic policies for each sub-region.

=== Planning Policy Wales ===
Planning Policy Wales is a document published by the Welsh Government which sets out detailed guidance and contains the Welsh Government's national planning policies.

Local authorities are required to consider the document when developing out their local development plans.

The 2018 version of the document was updated to reflect the requirements of the Well-being of Future Generations (Wales) Act 2015.

=== National Development Framework ===
The National Development Framework is the national spatial planning document for Wales under the Planning (Wales) Act 2015, written and published by the Welsh Government was first published in 2021. It sets out the Welsh Government's policies in relation to the use and the development of land in Wales and replaced the Wales Spatial Plan.

== Corporate joint committee policies ==
=== Strategic development plans ===
Strategic development plans are statutory documents published by corporate joint committees under the Planning (Wales) Act 2015.

Under the Local Government and Elections (Wales) Act 2021, corporate joint committees became responsible for writing and publishing strategic development plans. Before then, they were written and published by strategic planning panels.

They are designed to address issues that cross local authority boundaries.

== Local authority policies ==
=== Unitary development plans ===
Unitary development plans showed where development is acceptable, and the standards they were required to meet. Unitary development plans were replaced by local development plans.

=== Local development plans ===
Following the Planning and Compulsory Purchase Act 2004, each planning authority in Wales is required to prepare a local development plan (LDP) for its area. These are the sole development plans for each council and national park authority. Planning authorities in Wales must have regard to Welsh Government planning policy documents, in preparing LDPs.

== Development control ==
Development control is the process of administering and making decisions on planning applications, to develop or change the use of land or buildings. The basis for decisions on planning applications is usually the adopted development plan.

== Planning and Environment Decisions Wales ==
Planning and Environment Decisions Wales (PEDW; Welsh: Penderfyniadau Cynllunio ac Amgylchedd Cymru, PCAC) is the planning division of the Welsh Government.

It replaced Planning Inspectorate Wales (Arolygiaeth Gynllunio Cymru) on 1 October 2021, though the inspectors and staff from the Planning Inspectorate were transferred to the new body. PEDW would handle cases for "developments of national significance", although nationally significant infrastructure projects in Wales under the Planning Act 2008 would remain with the Planning Inspectorate.

PEDW manages the casework in the public interest that relates to the development and use of land. It is responsible for:

- planning and enforcement appeals,
- environmental appeals,
- applications for developments of national significance,
- strategic and local development plans,
- compulsory purchase orders
- major infrastructure projects
- common land
- rights of way
- sustainable drainage systems
- stop and remediation services
- advice and training

They have 20 inspectors and 25 support staff.

If a local planning authority (either one of the 22 councils or 3 national park authorities) rejects a planning application, PEDW deals with any appeals of that decision.

In October 2024, councillors of Blaenau Gwent County Borough Council described PEDW's decisions as "inconsistent" or "disregard[ing] some of [the council's] localised policies", following the overruling of the council's rejection of a planning application.

In November 2024, Rebecca Evans, Cabinet Secretary for Economy, Energy and Planning, announced that PEDW would take final decisions on renewable energy projects themselves rather than making recommendations to ministers who would then make a decision. Evans stated the change hoped to speed up the approval process for renewable energy projects in Wales.
