= 2021 Essex County Council election =

2021 UK local government election

- 6 May 2021

All 75 seats to Essex County Council 38 seats needed for a majority
- Registered: 1,126,124
- Turnout: 33.2% (▲2.1%)

	First party	Second party	Third party
Leader	David Finch	Michael Mackrory	Ivan Henderson
Party	Conservative	Liberal Democrats	Labour
Leader since	May 2013	May 2012	June 2016
Leader's seat	Hedingham (Retiring)	Springfield	Harwich
Last election	56 seats, 49.3%	7 seats, 13.7%	6 seats, 16.9%
Seats before	51	8	6
Seats won	52	8	5
Seat change	▼4	▲1	▼1
Popular vote	197,494	55,664	69,364
Percentage	48.7%	13.8%	17.1%
Swing	▼0.6%	▲0.1%	▲0.2%
	Fourth party	Fifth party	Sixth party
Leader	n/a	n/a	Dave Blackwell
Party	Independent	R4U	CIIP
Leader since	n/a	n/a	May 2013
Leader's seat	n/a	n/a	Canvey Island East
Last election	2 seats, 1.2%	0 seats, 1.4%	2 seats, 1.0%
Seats before	4	0	2
Seats won	3	2	2
Seat change	▲1	▲2	Steady
Popular vote	24,220	9,732	4,121
Percentage	6.0%	2.4%	1.0%
Swing	▲4.8%	▲1.0%	0.0%
	Seventh party	Eighth party	Ninth party
Leader	James Abbott	Chris Pond	Michael Hoy
Party	Green	Loughton Residents	Rochford Resident
Leader since	May 2013	May 2005	May 2021
Leader's seat	Witham Northern (Defeated)	Loughton Central	Rochford West
Last election	1 seat, 4.3%	1 seat, 1.2%	0 seats, 1.1%
Seats before	1	1	0
Seats won	1	1	1
Seat change	Steady	Steady	▲1
Popular vote	22,630	4,710	4,447
Percentage	5.6%	1.2%	1.1%
Swing	▲1.3%	▲0.4%	New
- Map showing the results of the 2021 Essex County Council election
Council control before election
Conservative
Council control after election
Conservative

The 2021 Essex County Council election took place on 6 May 2021 as part of the 2021 United Kingdom local elections. All 75 councillors were elected from 70 electoral divisions, with each returning either one or two councillors by first-past-the-post voting for a four-year term of office.

The electoral divisions were the same as those used at the previous elections in 2005, 2009, 2013 and 2017.

== Previous composition ==
=== 2017 election ===
Party	Seats
Conservative	56
Liberal Democrats	7
Labour	6
CIIP	2
Green	1
Loughton Residents	1
Independent	2
Total	75

=== Composition of council seats before election ===
Party	Seats
Conservative	51
Liberal Democrats	8
Labour	6
CIIP	2
Green	1
Loughton Residents	1
Independent	4
Vacant	2
Total	75

=== Changes between elections ===
In between the 2017 election and the 2021 election, the following council seats changed hands:

Division	Date	Previous Party	New Party	Cause	Resulting Council Composition						
Division	Date	Previous Party	New Party	Cause	Con	LDem	Lab	Ind	CInd	Grn	LRes
Bocking	6 April 2018	Conservative	Independent	Councillor suspended from party.	55	7	6	3	2	1	1
Clacton North	2 October 2018	Conservative	Liberal Democrats	Sitting Conservatives Councillor defected to Liberal Democrats.	54	8	6	3	2	1	1
Halstead	21 February 2019	Conservative	Independent	Councillor quit party to sit as an independent member.	53	8	6	4	2	1	1
Rochford North	1 April 2020	Conservative	Vacant	Sitting councillor died	52	8	6	4	2	1	1
Chigwell & Loughton Broadway	13 April 2021	Conservative	Vacant	Sitting councillor resigned.	51	8	6	4	2	1	1

== Summary ==
=== Election result ===
2021 Essex County Council election
Party	Candidates	Seats	Gains	Losses	Net gain/loss	Seats %	Votes %	Votes	+/−
Conservative	75	52	3	7	▼4	69.3	48.7	197,494	–0.5
Liberal Democrats	70	8	3	2	▲1	10.7	13.8	55,664	+0.1
Labour	75	5	0	1	▼1	6.7	17.1	69,364	+0.2
Independent	24	3	1	0	▲1	4.0	6.0	24,318	+4.7
R4U	4	2	2	0	▲2	2.7	2.4	9,732	+1.0
CIIP	2	2	0	0	Steady	2.7	1.0	4,121	±0.0
Green	41	1	1	1	Steady	1.3	5.6	22,630	+1.3
Loughton Residents	2	1	0	0	Steady	1.3	1.2	4,710	+0.4
Rochford Resident	2	1	1	0	▲1	1.3	1.1	4,447	N/A
Reform	15	0	0	0	Steady	0.0	0.6	2,859	N/A
Tendring First	3	0	0	0	Steady	0.0	0.5	2,029	+0.1
Wickford Ind.	1	0	0	0	Steady	0.0	0.4	1,660	–0.4
Ind. Network	1	0	0	0	Steady	0.0	0.4	1,520	N/A
Harlow Alliance	2	0	0	0	Steady	0.0	0.4	1,511	N/A
UKIP	4	0	0	0	Steady	0.0	0.3	1,032	–7.6
SWFCTA	1	0	0	0	Steady	0.0	0.2	979	±0.0
Residents	1	0	0	0	Steady	0.0	0.1	554	N/A
For Britain	3	0	0	0	Steady	0.0	0.1	380	N/A
English Democrat	1	0	0	0	Steady	0.0	<0.1	186	±0.0
RED	1	0	0	0	Steady	0.0	<0.1	135	N/A
Workers Party	1	0	0	0	Steady	0.0	<0.1	94	N/A
Freedom Alliance (UK)	1	0	0	0	Steady	0.0	<0.1	89	N/A
Young People's Party UK	1	0	0	0	Steady	0.0	<0.1	45	N/A

=== Election of Group Leaders ===
Kevin Bentley (Stanway and Pyefleet) was elected leader of the Conservative Group, with Louise McKinlay (Brentwood Hutton) as his deputy.

Michael Mackrory (Springfield) was re elected leader of the Liberal Democratic Group, with David King (Mile End and Highwoods) as his deputy.

Ivan Henderson (Harwich) was re elected leader of the Labour Group, with Adele Brown (Laindon Park & Fryerns) as his deputy.

Chris Pond (Loughton Central) was re elected leader of the Non-Aligned Group with Michael Hoy (Rochford West) as his deputy.

=== Election of Leader of the Council ===
Kevin Bentley the leader of the Conservative group was duly elected leader of the council and formed a Conservative administration.

== Results by District ==
=== Basildon ===
District Summary

Basildon borough summary
Party	Seats	+/-	Votes	%	+/-
Conservative	6	Steady	35,731	52.6	+3.6
Labour	2	Steady	16,252	23.9	+2.8
Independent	1	Steady	5,082	7.5	–2.3
Liberal Democrats	0	Steady	6,934	10.2	+4.2
Wickford Ind.	0	Steady	1,660	2.4	N/A
Reform	0	Steady	1,479	2.2	N/A
UKIP	0	Steady	684	1.0	–12.0
TUSC	0	Steady	49	0.1	N/A
Total	9	Steady	41,910	29.9	
Registered electors			139,944	–	

Division Results

Basildon Westley Heights
Party	Candidate	Votes	%	±%
Independent	Kerry Smith*	3,655	60.5	−0.1
Conservative	Charlie Sansom	1,404	23.3	−0.8
Labour	Kayode Adekunle Adeniran	627	10.4	+0.5
Liberal Democrats	Timothy Nicklin	205	3.4	−1.9
Independent	None of the Above X	98	1.6	N/A
TUSC	David Murray	49	0.8	N/A
Majority		2,251	37.2	+0.7
Turnout		6,038	34.8	+1.2
Registered electors		17,373		
Independent hold		Swing	▲0.4	

Billericay & Burstead (2 seats)
Party	Candidate	Votes	%	±%
Conservative	Anthony Hedley*	6,311	60.3	−9.3
Conservative	Richard Moore*	5,364	51.3	−11.6
Liberal Democrats	Edward Sainsbury	2,751	26.3	+15.9
Liberal Democrats	Laura Clark	1,695	16.2	+8.5
Labour	Tracey Hilton	1,165	11.1	−1.0
Labour	Malcolm Reid	930	8.9	+0.6
UKIP	Susan McCaffery	315	3.0	−4.0
Turnout		10,458	37.6	+5.0
Registered electors		27,789		
Conservative hold				
Conservative hold				

Laindon Park & Fryerns (2 seats)
Party	Candidate	Votes	%	±%
Conservative	Jeff Henry*	3,206	41.3	+5.6
Labour	Adele Brown	2,668	34.4	+1.6
Conservative	Andrew Schrader	2,558	33.0	−0.8
Labour	Allan Davies*	2,358	30.4	−4.7
Independent	Tony Low	493	6.4	N/A
Reform	Lewis Fripp	413	5.3	N/A
UKIP	Fred Southgate	369	4.8	−18.1
Reform	Norma Saggers	331	4.3	N/A
Liberal Democrats	Vivien Howard	324	4.2	−1.0
Liberal Democrats	Michael Chandler	321	4.1	−0.7
Turnout		7,760	25.1	+4.1
Registered electors		30,917		
Conservative hold				
Labour hold				

Pitsea (2 seats)
Party	Candidate	Votes	%	±%
Conservative	Luke MacKenzie	3,573	41.5	+3.7
Labour	Aiden McGurran	3,257	37.8	+2.9
Labour	Patricia Reid*	3,115	36.1	−1.0
Conservative	Craig Rimmer	3,091	35.9	+3.0
Reform	Daniel Tooley	501	5.8	N/A
Liberal Democrats	Martin Howard	454	5.3	+0.3
Liberal Democrats	Philip Jenkins	422	4.9	+0.6
Turnout		8,619	26.3	+4.1
Registered electors		32,816		
Conservative hold				
Labour hold				

Wickford Crouch (2 seats)
Party	Candidate	Votes	%	±%
Conservative	Tony Ball*	5,752	63.7	+8.0
Conservative	Malcolm Buckley*	4,472	49.5	−1.4
Wickford Ind.	Eunice Brockman	1,660	18.4	+1.3
Labour	Mark Burton-Sampson	1,131	12.5	−0.1
Labour	Gillian Palmer	1,001	11.1	+0.5
Independent	Sean Barlow	836	9.3	N/A
Liberal Democrats	Nicola Hoad	386	4.3	−0.3
Liberal Democrats	Simon Blake	376	4.2	N/A
Reform	Neil Huntley	234	2.6	N/A
Turnout		9,035	29.1	−3.1
Registered electors		31,049		
Conservative hold				
Conservative hold				

=== Braintree ===
The Greens and some Independent candidates formed an alliance named the Green & Independent Group

District summary

Braintree district summary
Party	Seats	+/-	Votes	%	+/-
Conservative	7	Steady	18,352	51.1	–3.7
Green (Note: Including allied Independent candidates.)	1	Steady	9,819	27.3	+17.0
Labour	0	Steady	5,831	16.2	–2.1
Liberal Democrats	0	Steady	1,778	4.9	–3.3
Independent	0	Steady	142	0.4	N/A
Total	8	Steady	35,922	31.6	
Registered electors			113,810	–	

Division Results

Bocking
Party	Candidate	Votes	%	±%
Conservative	Lynette Bowers-Flint	2,179	58.3	+3.0
Labour	Moia Thorogood	912	24.4	−1.2
Green	Richard Unsworth	455	12.2	+8.1
Liberal Democrats	James Card	192	5.1	−0.5
Majority		1,267	33.9	+4.2
Turnout		3,738	27.3	−0.3
Registered electors		13,783		
Conservative hold		Swing	▲2.1	

Braintree Eastern
Party	Candidate	Votes	%	±%
Green	Paul Thorogood	2,573	49.4	+39.6
Conservative	Robert Mitchell *	1,980	38.0	−18.8
Labour	Robert Powers	511	9.8	−6.6
Liberal Democrats	Barry Fleet	149	2.9	−7.9
Majority		593	11.4	—
Turnout		5,213	38.7	+5.8
Registered electors		13,516		
Green gain from Conservative		Swing	▲29.2	

Braintree Town
Party	Candidate	Votes	%	±%
Conservative	Tom Cunningham	2,185	56.9	+5.5
Labour	Keiran Martin	900	23.4	−5.1
Independent (Green)	Colin Riches	509	13.3	N/A
Liberal Democrats	Kate Onions	246	6.4	−0.2
Majority		1,285	33.5	+10.7
Turnout		3,840	27.2	+1.2
Registered electors		14,188		
Conservative hold		Swing	▲5.3	

Halstead
Party	Candidate	Votes	%	±%
Conservative	Christopher Siddall	2,118	43.9	−15.4
Independent (Green)	Jo Beavis *	1,835	38.1	N/A
Labour	Garry Warren	749	15.5	−4.3
Liberal Democrats	Andrew Waugh	119	2.5	−4.9
Majority		283	5.8	−33.7
Turnout		4,821	31.0	+2.4
Registered electors		15,611		
Conservative hold		Swing	▼26.8	

Hedingham
Party	Candidate	Votes	%	±%
Conservative	Peter Schwier	3,183	63.4	−1.5
Labour	Shan Newhouse	747	14.9	+3.0
Green	Mark Posen	645	12.9	+8.0
Liberal Democrats	Mark Galvin	445	8.9	−2.0
Majority		2.436	48.5	−4.4
Turnout		5,020	34.6	+0.5
Registered electors		14,650		
Conservative hold		Swing	▼2.3	

Three Fields with Great Notley
Party	Candidate	Votes	%	±%
Conservative	Graham Butland *	2,307	53.8	−9.2
Independent (Green)	Michael Staines	1,182	27.5	N/A
Labour	Jack Coleman	446	10.4	−1.6
Liberal Democrats	Graham Sheppard	357	8.3	−1.7
Majority		1,125	26.3	−24.7
Turnout		4,292	35.2	+2.2
Registered electors		12,269		
Conservative hold		Swing	▼18.4	

Witham Northern
Party	Candidate	Votes	%	±%
Conservative	Ross Playle	2,051	42.6	+6.8
Green	James Abbott *	2,012	41.7	+3.8
Labour	Phil Barlow	615	12.8	−2.9
Independent	David Hodges	142	3.0	N/A
Majority		39	0.9	—
Turnout		4,820	33.3	+0.7
Registered electors		14,545		
Conservative gain from Green		Swing	▲1.5	

Witham Southern
Party	Candidate	Votes	%	±%
Conservative	Derrick Louis *	2,349	56.2	+5.1
Labour	Leanora Headley	951	22.8	+3.2
Green	Philip Hughes	608	14.6	+7.9
Liberal Democrats	Charles Ryland	270	6.5	−4.1
Majority		1,398	33.4	+1.9
Turnout		4,178	27.6	+0.6
Registered electors		15,248		
Conservative hold		Swing	▲1.0	

=== Brentwood ===
Borough summary

Brentwood borough summary
Party	Seats	+/-	Votes	%	+/-
Conservative	3	▲1	10,303	50.2	–2.8
Liberal Democrats	1	▼1	6,165	28.6	–2.5
Labour	0	Steady	2,388	11.1	+2.4
Green	0	Steady	1,391	6.5	+2.8
Reform	0	Steady	241	1.1	N/A
Total	4	Steady	21,591	36.2	
Registered electors			59,705	–	

Division Results

Brentwood Hutton
Party	Candidate	Votes	%	±%
Conservative	Louise McKinlay *	3,248	62.6	−9.5
Labour	Liam Preston	563	10.8	+0.6
Independent	Amanda Burham-Burton	557	10.7	N/A
Liberal Democrats	Philip Mynott	546	10.5	−2.3
Green	Juliette Rey	275	5.3	+3.5
Majority		2,685	51.8	−7.5
Turnout		5,228	34.1	+2.1
Registered electors		15,342		
Conservative hold		Swing	▼5.1	

Brentwood North
Party	Candidate	Votes	%	±%
Liberal Democrats	Barry Aspinell *	2,552	47.7	−3.3
Conservative	Jon Cloak	1,851	34.6	−0.7
Labour	Deborah Foster	459	8.6	+2.6
Green	Kelda Boothroyd	374	7.0	+4.9
Reform	William Hughes	111	2.1	N/A
Majority		701	13.1	−2.6
Turnout		5,347	37.1	+2.6
Registered electors		14,469		
Liberal Democrats hold		Swing	▼1.3	

Brentwood Rural
Party	Candidate	Votes	%	±%
Conservative	Lesley Wagland *	3,680	64.8	−0.7
Liberal Democrats	Darryl Sankey	1,189	20.9	+5.0
Green	Paul Jeater	410	7.2	+3.8
Labour	Cameron Ball	401	7.1	+0.2
Majority		2,491	43.9	−5.7
Turnout		5,680	39.3	−10.3
Registered electors		14,547		
Conservative hold		Swing	▼2.9	

Brentwood South
Party	Candidate	Votes	%	±%
Conservative	Andy Wiles	2,031	38.1	+0.5
Liberal Democrats	David Kendall *	1,878	35.2	−10.9
Labour	Susan Kortlandt	965	18.1	+6.1
Green	John Hamilton	332	6.2	+1.9
Reform	Dave Conway	130	2.4	N/A
Majority		153	2.9	N/A
Turnout		5,336	35.1	+4.5
Registered electors		15,347		
Conservative gain from Liberal Democrats		Swing	▲5.7	

=== Castle Point ===
Borough summary

Castle Point borough summary
Party	Seats	+/-	Votes	%	+/-
Conservative	3	Steady	10,295	44.2	–10.0
CIIP	2	Steady	4,121	17.7	–0.3
Independent	0	Steady	5,129	22.0	N/A
Labour	0	Steady	2,635	13.0	–0.4
Liberal Democrats	0	Steady	642	2.8	+0.3
Reform	0	Steady	132	0.6	N/A
Total	5	Steady	23,273	33.4	
Registered electors			69,739	–	

Division Results

Canvey Island East
Party	Candidate	Votes	%	±%
CIIP	David Blackwell *	2,289	51.3	+4.0
Conservative	Owen Cartey	1,610	36.1	+3.6
Labour	Jacqueline Reilly	380	8.5	+0.9
Reform	Jamie Huntman	132	3.0	N/A
Liberal Democrats	Richard Bannister	53	1.2	+0.1
Majority		679	15.2	+0.4
Turnout		4,464	29.4	+0.4
Registered electors		15,287		
CIIP hold		Swing	▲0.2	

Canvey Island West
Party	Candidate	Votes	%	±%
CIIP	Peter May *	1,832	49.8	±0.0
Conservative	Scott Griffin	1,406	38.2	−1.6
Labour	David Manclark	444	12.1	+2.1
Majority		426	11.6	+1.6
Turnout		3,682	26.4	+1.8
Registered electors		14,049		
CIIP hold		Swing	▲0.8	

Hadleigh
Party	Candidate	Votes	%	±%
Conservative	Jillian Reeves *	2,833	50.6	−15.6
Independent	Robert Baillie	1,719	30.7	N/A
Labour	Thomas Harrison	734	13.1	+1.2
Liberal Democrats	Geoffrey Duff	316	5.6	+0.4
Majority		1,114	19.9	−34.2
Turnout		5,602	39.3	+6.3
Registered electors		14,429		
Conservative hold		Swing	▼23.2	

South Benfleet
Party	Candidate	Votes	%	±%
Conservative	Andrew Sheldon *	2,462	48.2	−16.3
Independent	Lynsey McCarthy-Calvert	1,350	26.4	N/A
Labour	Laurence Chapman	732	14.3	−0.4
Independent	Christopher Roberts	422	8.3	N/A
Liberal Democrats	Ellis Swindell	144	2.8	−1.8
Majority		1,112	21.8	−26.4
Turnout		5,110	38.0	+5.4
Registered electors		13,561		
Conservative hold		Swing	▼21.4	

Thundersley
Party	Candidate	Votes	%	±%
Conservative	Beverley Egan *	1,984	44.9	−19.7
Independent	Steven Cole	1,638	37.1	N/A
Labour	Rosalind Dunhill	664	15.0	−6.1
Liberal Democrats	Stephen Tellis	129	2.9	N/A
Majority		346	7.8	−35.7
Turnout		4,415	35.9	+5.4
Registered electors		12,413		
Conservative hold		Swing	▼28.4	

=== Chelmsford ===
City summary

Chelmsford city summary
Party	Seats	+/-	Votes	%	+/-
Conservative	5	▼1	21,384	48.2	+4.2
Liberal Democrats	4	▲1	12,851	29.0	+3.3
Labour	0	Steady	4,307	9.7	+0.9
Green	0	Steady	3,141	7.1	+4.1
Ind. Network	0	Steady	1,520	3.4	N/A
SWFCTA	0	Steady	979	2.2	N/A
UKIP	0	Steady	113	0.3	–4.6
Independent	0	Steady	83	0.2	N/A
Total	9	Steady	44,518	33.3	
Registered electors			133,624	–	

Division Results

Broomfield & Writtle
Party	Candidate	Votes	%	±%
Conservative	Mike Steel	3,287	63.6	+9.4
Liberal Democrats	Nikki Perry	670	13.0	−3.6
Labour	Lucy Barrett	653	12.6	+4.7
Green	Nick Caddick	560	10.8	+7.8
Majority		2,617	50.6	+3.8
Turnout		5,170	32.1	+3.8
Registered electors		16,102		
Conservative hold		Swing	▲6.5	

Chelmer
Party	Candidate	Votes	%	±%
Conservative	John Spence *	3,186	59.4	−4.9
Liberal Democrats	Rose Moore	1,357	25.3	+10.3
Labour	David Howell	443	8.3	−1.3
Green	Ben Harvey	376	7.0	+2.2
Majority		1,829	34.1	−15.1
Turnout		5,362	33.0	+2.4
Registered electors		16,332		
Conservative hold		Swing	▲7.6	

Chelmsford Central
Party	Candidate	Votes	%	±%
Liberal Democrats	Marie Goldman	2,195	43.1	+5.5
Conservative	Seena Shah	1,992	39.2	−3.3
Labour	Edward Massey	511	10.0	−1.7
Green	Claire Young	389	7.6	+3.8
Majority		203	4.4	—
Turnout		5,189	34.1	+0.8
Registered electors		13,724		
Liberal Democrats gain from Conservative		Swing	▲4.4	

Chelmsford North
Party	Candidate	Votes	%	±%
Liberal Democrats	Stephen Robinson *	2,085	46.9	−0.1
Conservative	Mark Taylor	1,621	36.5	+1.5
Labour	Jessica Peacock	454	10.2	+0.2
Green	Angela Thomson	282	6.4	+3.5
Majority		464	10.4	−1.6
Turnout		4,442	33.6	−0.7
Registered electors		13,326		
Liberal Democrats hold		Swing	▼0.8	

Chelmsford West
Party	Candidate	Votes	%	±%
Liberal Democrats	Jude Deakin *	2,012	42.9	+3.8
Conservative	Ben McNally	1,688	36.0	+1.4
Labour	Pete Dixon	611	13.0	−3.1
Green	Ronnie Bartlett	380	8.1	+5.9
Majority		324	6.9	+2.4
Turnout		4,729	30.7	+1.0
Registered electors		15,401		
Liberal Democrats hold		Swing	▲1.2	

Great Baddow
Party	Candidate	Votes	%	±%
Conservative	Anthony McQuiggan	2,065	38.0	−8.7
Liberal Democrats	Smita Rajesh	1,433	26.3	−8.4
Ind. Network	Richard Hyland	1,133	20.8	N/A
Labour	Janbee Mopidevi	373	6.9	−1.7
Green	Alex Heard	324	6.0	+3.2
UKIP	Jesse Pryke	113	2.1	−5.2
Majority		632	11.7	−0.2
Turnout		5,441	35.7	+4.4
Registered electors		15,503		
Conservative hold		Swing	▼0.2	

South Woodham Ferrers
Party	Candidate	Votes	%	±%
Conservative	Bob Massey *	1,936	55.7	+10.0
SWFCTA	Jill Winn	979	28.2	+6.7
Labour	Emmanuel Kemball	241	6.9	+1.5
Green	David Rey	186	5.4	+2.3
Liberal Democrats	Ian Gale	132	3.8	−0.4
Majority		957	27.5	+3.3
Turnout		3,474	28.6	+1.3
Registered electors		12,212		
Conservative hold		Swing	▲1.7	

Springfield
Party	Candidate	Votes	%	±%
Liberal Democrats	Mike Mackrory *	2,630	46.0	−0.1
Conservative	James Tyrrell	2,141	37.4	+0.2
Labour Co-op	Russell Kennedy	524	9.2	+0.2
Green	James Lumbard	340	6.0	+3.6
Democratic Network	Leah Butler-Smith	83	1.5	N/A
Majority		489	8.6	−0.2
Turnout		5,718	35.5	+1.6
Registered electors		16,223		
Liberal Democrats hold		Swing	▼0.2	

Stock
Party	Candidate	Votes	%	±%
Conservative	Ian Grundy *	3,468	69.5	+1.2
Labour	Jake Havard	497	10.0	+2.7
Ind. Network	Paul Clark	387	7.8	N/A
Liberal Democrats	Tom Willis	337	6.8	+0.4
Green	Brian Littlechild	304	6.1	+2.8
Majority		2,971	59.5	+6.0
Turnout		4,993	34.2	+0.4
Registered electors		14,801		
Conservative hold		Swing	▼0.8	

=== Colchester ===
District Summary

Colchester borough summary
Party	Seats	+/-	Votes	%	+/-
Conservative	5	▲1	21,044	44.2	+1.9
Labour	2	▼1	11,489	24.1	+3.4
Liberal Democrats	2	Steady	9,831	20.6	–3.6
Green	0	Steady	4,721	9.9	+4.4
Reform	0	Steady	446	0.9	N/A
Freedom Alliance	0	Steady	89	0.2	N/A
Total	9	Steady	47,620	33.7	
Registered electors			141,187	–	

Division Results

Abbey
Party	Candidate	Votes	%	±%
Labour	Lee Scordis *	2,556	45.0	+12.9
Conservative	Petra Crees	1,475	25.9	+0.5
Green	Steph Nissen	981	17.3	+8.1
Liberal Democrats	Peter Schraml	585	10.3	−18.7
Freedom Alliance	Tim James	89	1.6	N/A
Majority		1,081	19.1	+16.0
Turnout		5,686	30.6	+1.4
Registered electors		18,738		
Labour hold		Swing	▲6.2	

Constable
Party	Candidate	Votes	%	±%
Conservative	Lewis Barber	3,965	67.1	−1.5
Labour Co-op	Pauline Bacon	707	12.0	+1.7
Green	Roger Bamforth	613	10.4	+2.7
Liberal Democrats	William Brown	491	8.3	−5.2
Reform	Andrew Phillips	135	2.3	N/A
Majority		3,258	55.1	±0.0
Turnout		5,911	39.6	+3.4
Registered electors		15,031		
Conservative hold		Swing	▼1.6	

Drury
Party	Candidate	Votes	%	±%
Conservative	Sue Lissimore *	3,328	56.1	−2.1
Labour	Richard Bourne	1,263	21.3	+10.8
Liberal Democrats	Isobel Merry	802	13.5	−8.9
Green	Natalie Edgoose	540	9.1	+3.8
Majority		2,065	34.8	−1.1
Turnout		5,933	42.0	+0.9
Registered electors		14,244		
Conservative hold		Swing	▼6.6	

Maypole
Party	Candidate	Votes	%	±%
Labour	Dave Harris *	2,187	49.8	−1.7
Conservative	Chris Piggott	1,233	28.1	+0.5
Liberal Democrats	Tony Emment	666	15.2	+1.0
Green	Blake Roberts	215	4.9	+2.6
Reform	Joe Johnson	92	2.1	N/A
Majority		954	21.7	−2.2
Turnout		4,393	29.0	+0.7
Registered electors		15,204		
Labour hold		Swing	▼1.1	

Mersea & Tiptree
Party	Candidate	Votes	%	±%
Conservative	John Jowers *	3,592	71.8	+22.8
Green	Peter Banks	672	13.4	+8.0
Labour	Usha Agarwal-Hollands	483	9.7	−0.5
Liberal Democrats	Susan Waite	256	5.1	−1.0
Majority		2,920	58.4	+29.7
Turnout		5,003	34.5	−1.9
Registered electors		14,504		
Conservative hold		Swing	▲7.4	

Mile End & Highwoods
Party	Candidate	Votes	%	±%
Liberal Democrats	David King	2,221	39.9	−6.6
Conservative	David Linghorn-Baker	1,856	33.3	−0.9
Labour	Jocelyn Law	946	17.0	+6.7
Green	Amanda Kirke	387	7.0	+2.4
Reform	Diane Baker	162	2.9	N/A
Majority		365	6.6	−5.7
Turnout		5,572	32.1	+2.6
Registered electors		17,480		
Liberal Democrats hold		Swing	▼2.9	

Parsons Heath & East Gates
Party	Candidate	Votes	%	±%
Conservative	Simon Crow	1,895	41.2	+7.1
Liberal Democrats	John Baker *	1,516	33.0	−10.3
Labour	Abigail Chambers	691	15.0	+3.2
Green	Kemal Cufoglu	498	10.8	+6.7
Majority		379	8.2	N/A
Turnout		4,600	35.9	+1.3
Registered electors		12,942		
Conservative gain from Liberal Democrats		Swing	▲8.7	

Stanway & Pyefleet
Party	Candidate	Votes	%	±%
Conservative	Kevin Bentley *	3,004	51.1	−3.8
Liberal Democrats	Lesley Scott-Boutell	1,469	25.0	+2.0
Labour	Michael Lilley	1,014	17.3	+6.3
Green	John McArthur	388	6.6	+1.1
Majority		1,535	26.1	−5.8
Turnout		5,875	35.7	±0.0
Registered electors		16,536		
Conservative hold		Swing	▼2.9	

Wivenhoe St Andrew
Party	Candidate	Votes	%	±%
Liberal Democrats	Mark Cory	1,825	39.3	+14.1
Labour Co-op	Julie Young *	1,642	35.3	−12.7
Conservative	Jodie Clark	696	15.0	−0.5
Green	Asa Aldis	427	9.2	+5.2
Reform	Kevin Blair	57	1.2	N/A
Majority		183	4.0	N/A
Turnout		4,647	28.4	−8.2
Registered electors		16,508		
Liberal Democrats gain from Labour Co-op		Swing	▲13.4	

=== Epping Forest ===
District Summary

Epping Forest district summary
Party	Seats	+/-	Votes	%	+/-
Conservative	6	Steady	16,764	50.7	–4.4
Loughton Residents	1	Steady	4,710	14.2	+4.3
Labour	0	Steady	4,292	13.0	+2.2
Liberal Democrats	0	Steady	3,901	11.8	–3.8
Green	0	Steady	2,588	7.8	+2.8
For Britain	0	Steady	302	0.9	N/A
English Democrat	0	Steady	186	0.6	+0.4
Reform	0	Steady	97	0.3	N/A
TUSC	0	Steady	59	0.2	N/A
Independent	0	Steady	52	0.2	N/A
Young People's	0	Steady	45	0.1	N/A
Total	7	Steady	33,048	32.7	
Registered electors			100,990	–	

Division Results

Buckhurst Hill & Loughton South
Party	Candidate	Votes	%	±%
Conservative	Marshall Vance	2,186	35.5	−21.0
Loughton Residents	Ian Allgood	1,716	27.9	N/A
Green	Simon Heap	1,336	21.7	−0.8
Labour	Inez Collier	519	8.4	−1.2
Liberal Democrats	Ish Matharu	256	4.2	−7.2
Independent	Kevin Horner	72	1.2	N/A
Young People's	Gerard Wadsworth	45	0.7	N/A
TUSC	Scott Jones	23	0.4	N/A
Majority		470	7.6	
Turnout		6,153	39.2	
Registered electors		15,869		
Conservative hold		Swing	▼24.5	

Chigwell & Loughton Broadway
Party	Candidate	Votes	%	±%
Conservative	Lee Scott	2,686	63.3	−2.4
Labour	Angela Ayre	881	20.8	+4.1
Green	Laura Anderson	427	10.1	N/A
Liberal Democrats	Stephen Hume	252	5.9	−11.7
Majority		1,805	42.5	−5.5
Turnout		4,246	30.8	+8.4
Registered electors		13,981		
Conservative hold		Swing	▼3.3	

Epping & Theydon Bois
Party	Candidate	Votes	%	±%
Conservative	Holly Whitbread	2,909	50.1	+4.5
Liberal Democrats	Jon Whitehouse	2,459	42.4	−0.5
Labour	Simon Bullough	439	7.6	+0.9
Majority		450	7.7	+5.0
Turnout		5,807	41.2	+2.5
Registered electors		13,605		
Conservative hold		Swing	▲2.5	

Loughton Central
Party	Candidate	Votes	%	±%
Loughton Residents	Chris Pond *	2,994	66.3	−3.0
Conservative	Jonathan Hunter	828	18.3	−1.4
Labour	Debbie Wild	552	12.2	+4.1
Liberal Democrats	Naomi Davies	145	3.2	+0.2
Majority		2,166	48.0	−1.7
Turnout		4,519	32.3	+3.5
Registered electors		14,083		
Loughton Residents hold		Swing	▼0.8	

North Weald & Nazeing
Party	Candidate	Votes	%	±%
Conservative	Christopher Whitbread *	2,884	72.6	−6.2
Labour	Liam Kerrigan	656	16.5	+3.8
Liberal Democrats	Elaine Thatcher	435	10.9	+2.1
Majority		2,228	56.1	−9.6
Turnout		3,975	28.1	+0.7
Registered electors		14,273		
Conservative hold		Swing	▼5.0	

Ongar & Rural
Party	Candidate	Votes	%	±%
Conservative	Jaymey McIvor	2,723	69.6	+1.4
Labour	Richard Millwood	409	10.5	+1.3
Green	Alan Fricker	224	5.7	N/A
Liberal Democrats	Edward Barnard	220	5.6	−7.0
English Democrat	Robin Tilbrook	186	4.8	+3.1
Reform	Peter Bell	97	2.5	N/A
Democratic Network	Paul Stevens	52	1.3	N/A
Majority		2,314	59.1	+3.5
Turnout		3,911	31.3	+3.6
Registered electors		12,546		
Conservative hold		Swing	▲0.5	

Waltham Abbey
Party	Candidate	Votes	%	±%
Conservative	Sam Kane	2,548	57.4	−2.3
Labour	Robert Greyson	836	18.9	+3.5
Green	Liam Lakes	581	13.1	+4.6
For Britain	Julian Leppert	302	6.8	N/A
Liberal Democrats	Timothy Vaughan	134	3.0	−1.6
TUSC	Ian Pattison	36	0.8	N/A
Majority		1,712	38.5	−5.8
Turnout		4,437	26.9	+4.1
Registered electors		16,633		
Conservative hold		Swing	▼2.9	

=== Harlow ===
District summary

Harlow district summary
Party	Seats	+/-	Votes	%	+/-
Conservative	4	Steady	15,062	54.4	+3.9
Labour	0	Steady	9,762	35.2	–5.7
Harlow Alliance	0	Steady	1,511	5.5	N/A
Liberal Democrats	0	Steady	1,304	4.7	–0.1
Total	4	Steady	20,539	32.2	
Registered electors			63,731	–	

Division Results

Harlow North
Party	Candidate	Votes	%	±%
Conservative	Michael Garnett *	3,289	56.9	+5.9
Labour Co-op	Kay Morrison	2,110	36.5	−4.8
Liberal Democrats	Lesley Rideout	380	6.6	−1.1
Majority		1,179	20.4	+10.7
Turnout		5,779	31.2	+2.1
Registered electors		18,771		
Conservative hold		Swing	▲5.4	

Harlow South East
Party	Candidate	Votes	%	±%
Conservative	Edward Johnson *	3,055	61.7	+3.7
Labour	Mark Ingall	1,632	33.0	−2.2
Liberal Democrats	William Tennison	200	4.0	−2.8
TUSC	Paul Lenihan	66	1.3	N/A
Majority		1,423	28.7	+5.8
Turnout		4,953	33.5	+4.8
Registered electors		14,891		
Conservative hold		Swing	▲3.0	

Harlow West (2 seats)
Party	Candidate	Votes	%	±%
Conservative	Michael Hardware *	4,848	49.4	+2.7
Conservative	Clive Souter *	3,870		
Labour	Daniella Pritchard	3,255	33.2	−7.8
Labour	Chris Vince	2,765		
Harlow Alliance	Nicholas Taylor	764	7.8	N/A
Harlow Alliance	Alan Leverett	747		
Liberal Democrats	Christopher Millington	378	3.9	+0.4
Liberal Democrats	Robert Thurston	346		
Turnout		9,807	32.6	+4.3
Registered electors		30,069		
Conservative hold				
Conservative hold				

=== Maldon ===
District Results

Maldon district summary
Party	Seats	+/-	Votes	%	+/-
Conservative	2	▼1	8,458	47.2	–6.5
Independent	1	▲1	4,904	27.3	+17.7
Liberal Democrats	0	Steady	1,662	9.3	+1.6
Labour	0	Steady	1,411	7.9	–3.3
Green	0	Steady	1,287	7.1	+2.4
UKIP	0	Steady	235	1.3	–8.4
Total	3	Steady	17,937	35.0	
Registered electors			51,221	–	

Division Results

Heybridge & Tollesbury
Party	Candidate	Votes	%	±%
Conservative	Mark Durham *	3,359	56.9	−1.0
Independent	Carey Martin	935	15.8	N/A
Labour	Ann Griffin	618	10.5	−0.2
Green	Jonathan King	600	10.2	+4.2
Liberal Democrats	John Driver	397	6.7	−1.8
Majority		2,424	41.1	−6.1
Turnout		5,909	35.6	+4.1
Registered electors		16,745		
Conservative hold		Swing	▼8.2	

Maldon
Party	Candidate	Votes	%	±%
Conservative	Jane Fleming	2,818	50.7	−9.7
Liberal Democrats	Colin Baldy	1,126	20.2	+9.0
Independent	Kevin Lagan	698	12.6	N/A
Labour	Stephen Capper	424	7.6	−6.7
Green	Janet Dine	359	6.5	+1.2
Independent	Chrisy Morris	140	2.5	N/A
Majority		1,692	30.5	−15.5
Turnout		5,562	36.3	+4.5
Registered electors		15,415		
Conservative hold		Swing	▼9.4	

Southminster
Party	Candidate	Votes	%	±%
Independent	Wendy Stamp	3,131	48.4	+22.4
Conservative	Ron Pratt *	2,281	35.3	−9.2
Labour	Jacqueline Brown	369	5.7	−3.4
Green	James Taylor	311	4.8	+1.7
UKIP	Peter Horscroft	235	3.6	−9.5
Liberal Democrats	James Eley	139	2.2	−2.0
Majority		850	13.1	N/A
Turnout		6,466	34.1	+2.4
Registered electors		19,061		
Independent gain from Conservative		Swing	▲15.8	

=== Rochford ===
District Summary

Rochford district summary
Party	Seats	+/-	Votes	%	+/-
Conservative	3	▼2	10,508	45.9	–0.8
Liberal Democrats	1	▲1	4,507	19.7	+9.2
Rochford Resident	1	▲1	4,447	19.4	+12.9
Labour	0	Steady	2,797	12.2	+1.5
Independent	0	Steady	645	2.8	+2.0
Total	5	Steady	22,983	34.1	
Registered electors			67,395	–	

Division Results

Rayleigh North
Party	Candidate	Votes	%	±%
Liberal Democrats	Craig Cannell	2,209	45.2	+14.4
Conservative	Simon Smith	2,151	44.0	−0.7
Labour	Steve Cooper	533	10.9	+3.9
Majority		58	1.2	—
Turnout		4,893	37.5	+1.3
Registered electors		13,190		
Liberal Democrats gain from Conservative		Swing	▲7.5	

Rayleigh South
Party	Candidate	Votes	%	±%
Conservative	June Lumley *	2,160	48.4	−1.8
Liberal Democrats	James Newport	1,741	39.0	+27.1
Labour	Conner Agius	561	12.6	+4.7
Majority		419	9.4	−25.1
Turnout		4,462	35.0	+2.5
Registered electors		12,880		
Conservative hold		Swing	▼14.5	

Rochford North
Party	Candidate	Votes	%	±%
Conservative	Laureen Shaw	1,858	40.0	−4.6
Rochford Resident	Adrian Eves	1,683	36.3	+3.3
Independent	George Ioannou	645	13.9	N/A
Labour	David Flack	456	9.8	+0.3
Majority		175	3.8	−18.2
Turnout		4,686	34.5	+2.7
Registered electors		13,574		
Conservative hold		Swing	▼4.0	

Rochford South
Party	Candidate	Votes	%	±%
Conservative	Mike Steptoe *	2,384	63.5	+17.9
Labour	Penny Richards	814	21.7	−1.9
Liberal Democrats	Deborah Taylor	557	14.8	+10.2
Majority		1,570	41.8	+19.8
Turnout		3,755	28.3	−1.4
Registered electors		13,504		
Conservative hold		Swing	▲9.9	

Rochford West
Party	Candidate	Votes	%	±%
Rochford Resident	Michael Hoy	2,764	53.7	N/A
Conservative	Carole Weston *	1,955	38.0	−10.2
Labour	Ian Rooke	433	8.0	+0.3
Majority		809	15.7	+4.2
Turnout		5,187	36.4	+2.4
Registered electors		14,247		
Rochford Resident gain from Conservative		Swing	▲31.9	

=== Tendring ===
District Summary

Tendring district summary
Party	Seats	+/-	Votes	%	+/-
Conservative	6	Steady	18,561	50.7	+4.5
Labour	1	Steady	6,158	16.8	–2.4
Independent	1	Steady	4,261	11.6	+6.4
Liberal Democrats	0	Steady	3,251	8.9	+1.4
Tendring First	0	Steady	2,029	5.5	+1.9
Green	0	Steady	1,417	3.9	+0.4
Residents	0	Steady	554	1.5	N/A
Reform	0	Steady	219	0.6	N/A
Workers Party	0	Steady	94	0.3	N/A
For Britain	0	Steady	78	0.2	N/A
Total	8	Steady	36,867	31.8	
Registered electors			115,912	–	

Division Results

Brightlingsea
Party	Candidate	Votes	%	±%
Conservative	Alan Goggin *	2,426	44.6	−2.9
Independent	Mick Barry	1,580	29.1	N/A
Liberal Democrats	Gary Scott	1,056	19.4	−5.4
Labour	Margaret Saunders	376	6.9	−5.1
Majority		846	15.5	−3.3
Turnout		5,438	34.7	−1.0
Registered electors		15,803		
Conservative hold		Swing	▼16.0	

Clacton East
Party	Candidate	Votes	%	±%
Independent	Mark Stephenson *	1,902	42.3	N/A
Conservative	Chris Amos	1,454	32.4	+1.1
Residents	KT King	554	12.3	N/A
Labour	Geoffrey Ely	300	6.7	−2.7
Green	Rosie Dodds	117	2.6	+1.0
Reform	Kate Hammond	89	2.0	N/A
Liberal Democrats	Mary Pitkin	76	1.7	−0.1
Majority		448	9.9	—
Turnout		4,492	33.6	−2.2
Registered electors		13,439		
Independent gain from Residents		Swing	▲20.6	

Clacton North
Party	Candidate	Votes	%	±%
Conservative	Mike Skeels	1,404	50.6	+0.7
Labour	David Bolton	483	17.4	−4.7
Tendring First	Gina Placey	349	12.6	N/A
Independent	Andy Wood *	262	9.4	N/A
Green	Natasha Osben	146	5.3	+3.1
Reform	Andrew Pemberton	130	4.7	N/A
Majority		921	33.2	+5.4
Turnout		2,774	21.5	−4.2
Registered electors		12,887		
Conservative hold		Swing	▲2.7	

Clacton West
Party	Candidate	Votes	%	±%
Conservative	Paul Honeywood *	1,986	58.0	+7.0
Labour	Sheila Hammond	518	15.1	−9.8
Tendring First	Andy White	370	10.8	N/A
Reform	Andrew Morgan	245	7.2	N/A
Green	Tracey Osben	151	4.4	+1.9
Liberal Democrats	Sean Duffy	142	4.2	−0.2
For Britain	Myriam Sohail	11	0.3	N/A
Majority		1,468	42.9	+16.6
Turnout		3,423	27.1	−1.4
Registered electors		12,789		
Conservative hold		Swing	▲8.4	

Frinton & Walton
Party	Candidate	Votes	%	±%
Conservative	Mark Platt *	3,383	55.7	+3.7
Tendring First	Terry Allen	1,310	21.6	−1.0
Labour	Nic El-Safty	594	9.8	−0.7
Green	Susan Clutterbuck	353	5.8	+2.6
Independent	Stephen Mayzes	314	5.2	N/A
Liberal Democrats	Matthew Bensilum	125	2.1	−0.2
Majority		2,073	34.1	+4.7
Turnout		6,079	37.5	−0.6
Registered electors		16,438		
Conservative hold		Swing	▲2.4	

Harwich
Party	Candidate	Votes	%	±%
Labour	Ivan Henderson *	2,503	56.8	+5.4
Conservative	Ricky Callender	1,683	38.2	+9.1
Liberal Democrats	Simon Banks	220	5.0	+2.7
Majority		820	18.6	−3.1
Turnout		4,406	31.6	−4.0
Registered electors		13,964		
Labour hold		Swing	▼1.9	

Tendring Rural East
Party	Candidate	Votes	%	±%
Conservative	Dan Land	3,334	66.3	+15.2
Labour	Jo Henderson	807	16.0	−0.3
Liberal Democrats	Keith Pitkin	343	6.8	+0.9
Green	Chris Southall	277	5.5	+1.0
Independent	Danny Mayzes	203	4.0	N/A
For Britain	Craig Sohail	67	1.3	N/A
Majority		2,527	50.3	+21.3
Turnout		5,031	32.4	+0.2
Registered electors		15,687		
Conservative hold		Swing	▲7.8	

Tendring Rural West
Party	Candidate	Votes	%	±%
Conservative	Carlo Guglielmi *	2,891	55.3	−4.2
Liberal Democrats	Terry Barrett	1,289	24.7	+12.7
Labour	Maria Fowler	577	11.1	−1.3
Green	Beverley Maltby	373	7.1	−0.4
Workers Party	Ian Caruana	94	1.8	N/A
Majority		1,602	30.6	−16.6
Turnout		5,224	35.6	+2.3
Registered electors		14,905		
Conservative hold		Swing	▼8.5	

=== Uttlesford ===
Division Summary

Uttlesford district summary
Party	Seats	+/-	Votes	%	+/-
Conservative	2	▼2	10,525	39.5	–6.1
R4U	2	▲2	9,732	36.5	+14.6
Liberal Democrats	0	Steady	2,838	10.7	–7.2
Green	0	Steady	1,829	6.9	+3.5
Labour	0	Steady	1,723	6.5	–0.6
Total	4	Steady	26,647	38.7	
Registered electors			68,866	–	

Division Results

Dunmow
Party	Candidate	Votes	%	±%
Conservative	Susan Barker *	3,534	50.7	−5.2
R4U	Geoff Bagnall	2,283	32.8	+8.7
Labour	Gerard Darcy	422	6.1	−0.5
Green	Madeleine Radford	413	5.9	+3.7
Liberal Democrats	Lorraine Flawn	314	4.5	−2.1
Majority		1,251	17.9	−14.0
Turnout		6,966	34.4	+3.0
Registered electors		20,456		
Conservative hold		Swing	▼7.0	

Saffron Walden
Party	Candidate	Votes	%	±%
R4U	Paul Gadd	3,195	43.9	+12.2
Conservative	John Moran *	2,268	31.2	−4.4
Labour	Andrew Sampson	636	8.8	−0.2
Green	Edward Gildea	627	8.6	+5.1
Liberal Democrats	Simon Ede	546	7.5	−10.0
Majority		927	12.7	—
Turnout		7,272	43.2	+0.7
Registered electors		16,931		
R4U gain from Conservative		Swing	▲8.3	

Stansted
Party	Candidate	Votes	%	±%
Conservative	Ray Gooding *	2,547	38.0	+0.6
R4U	Bianca Donald	1,984	29.6	+4.2
Liberal Democrats	Ayub Khan	1,372	20.5	−7.2
Green	Debra Gold	407	6.1	+3.9
Labour	Samantha Naik	395	5.9	+1.3
Majority		563	8.4	−1.4
Turnout		6,705	40.3	−0.1
Registered electors		16,722		
Conservative hold		Swing	▼2.4	

Thaxted
Party	Candidate	Votes	%	±%
R4U	Martin Foley	2,270	39.8	N/A
Conservative	Simon Walsh *	2,176	38.2	−19.5
Liberal Democrats	Richard Silcock	606	10.6	−9.7
Green	Paul Allington	382	6.7	+0.2
Labour	Alex Young	270	4.7	−3.9
Majority		94	1.6	—
Turnout		5,704	38.8	+5.2
Registered electors		14,757		
R4U gain from Conservative		Swing	▲29.7	

== Maps ==
=== Vote share by seat ===
Conservative

Labour

Liberal Democrats

Green

== Changes 2021–2025 ==
=== By-elections ===
In December 2025, the Liberal Democrat group joined with councillors David Deakin, Michael Hoy and Paul Thorogood to form a Liberal Democrat and Independent Group. Conservative councillor Derrick Louis resigned from the Witham Southern division in the same month; no by-election was held because the scheduled 2026 county election was imminent.

Rayleigh North by-election, 3 March 2022
Party	Candidate	Votes	%	±%
Liberal Democrats	James Newport	1,658	57.4	
Conservative	Simon Smith	929	32.2	
Independent	Jack Lawmon	164	5.7	
Labour	Lorraine Ridley	137	4.7	
Majority		729	25.2	
Turnout		2,887	21.9	
Registered electors		13,183		
Liberal Democrats hold		Swing		

The by-election was triggered by the death of Liberal Democrat councillor Craig Cannell.

Laindon Park & Fryerns by-election, 4 May 2023
Party	Candidate	Votes	%	±%
Labour	Patricia Reid	2,748	49.7	+14.0
Conservative	Terri Sargent	1,890	34.2	–8.7
Green	Oliver McCarthy	445	8.1	N/A
Liberal Democrats	Mike Chandler	444	8.0	+3.7
Majority		858	15.5	N/A
Turnout		5,588	18.2	
Registered electors		30,722		
Labour hold		Swing		

The by-election followed the resignation of Labour councillor Adele Brown.

Harlow South East by-election, 2 May 2024
Party	Candidate	Votes	%	±%
Conservative	Andrew Johnson	2,008	48.6	–13.1
Labour	Kay Morrison	1,476	35.7	+2.8
UKIP	Dan Long	259	6.3	N/A
Green	Jennifer Steadman	257	6.2	N/A
Liberal Democrats	Christopher Millington	130	3.2	–0.9
Majority		532	12.9	
Turnout		4,163	28.1	–5.4
Conservative hold		Swing	–7.9	

The by-election was called following the resignation of councillor Eddie Johnson.

Pitsea by-election: 4 July 2024
Party	Candidate	Votes	%	±%
Labour	Emma Callaghan	5,959	43.9	+2.0
Conservative	Craig Rimmer	4,360	32.1	–13.8
Independent	Lurie Cojocaru	1,677	12.3	N/A
Liberal Democrats	Phil Jenkins	1,045	7.7	+1.9
TUSC	Jack Huggins	550	4.1	N/A
Majority		1,599	11.8	N/A
Turnout		13,901	42.2	+15.9
Registered electors		32,977		
Labour hold		Swing	▲7.9	

The by-election was triggered by the death of Conservative councillor Luke Mackenzie.

Stock by-election: 12 December 2024
Party	Candidate	Votes	%	±%
Conservative	Sue Dobson	1,304	46.4	–23.1
Reform	Thomas Allison	977	34.7	N/A
Independent	Paul Clark	160	5.7	–2.1
Liberal Democrats	Christine Shaw	156	5.5	–1.3
Labour	Stephen Capper	127	4.5	–5.5
Green	Edward Massey	89	3.2	–2.9
Majority		327	11.7	–47.8
Turnout		2,817	18.5	–15.7
Registered electors		15,195		
Conservative hold				

The by-election followed the death of Conservative councillor Ian Grundy.

Chelmsford Central by-election: 1 May 2025
Party	Candidate	Votes	%	±%
Liberal Democrats	David Loxton	2,030	47.5	+4.4
Conservative	Seena Shah	956	22.3	−16.9
Reform	Darren Brooke	869	20.3	N/A
Labour	Penny Richards	227	5.3	−4.7
Green	Ronnie Bartlett	196	4.6	−3.0
Majority		1,074	25.1	+20.7
Turnout		4,289	29.5	−4.6
Liberal Democrats hold		Swing	▲10.7	

The by-election was triggered by the resignation of Liberal Democrat councillor Marie Goldman after her election as Member of Parliament for Chelmsford.
