= Planning Aid =

Planning Aid provides free urban and environmental planning advice to individuals and community groups who cannot afford to pay a professional consultant, via a number of charitable organisations throughout the UK. A similar scheme, Community Technical Aid, operates in part of Ireland.

== In the UK ==
Planning Aid began in the early 1970s when the London Planning Aid Service (LPAS) launched. Planning Aid organisations in other parts of the UK developed throughout the 1970s, 80s and 90s. A number of these are still independent - notably Planning Aid for Scotland, Planning Aid London and Planning Aid Wales. Others are run by the Royal Town Planning Institute (often abbreviated to the RTPI), the professional body for town and country planning in the UK.

Since 2004, the UK government has supported and expanded the Planning Aid service in England. This has had the effect of extending the Planning Aid service to many more areas of the country, and in part a recognition to many communities that find it hard to engage with the planning system, and that community involvement at the right time can help to deliver more successful policies and projects.

Planning Aid England services are organised through the RTPI (with the exception of Planning Aid London, which is independently managed). More information on Planning Aid England services can be found on Planning Aid's website.

== In Ireland ==
In the Republic of Ireland, a commitment to introducing Planning Aid is contained in the 2007 Fianna Fáil / Greens Agreed Programme for Government. Despite this, the appointment of Dr Peter Clinch, a senior academic planner, as Special Adviser to the Taoiseach, and the appointment of a Minister of State with responsibility for planning ( Ciarán Cuffe T.D. of the Greens, himself a former lecturer in planning) there has been no progress to date (May 2010) re the implementation of a Planning Aid scheme.

A geographically very limited planning aid service has been provided since 1995 by Community Technical Aid, an NGO based in the north inner city area of Dublin.

== See also ==
- Planning Aid for Scotland
- Planning Aid Wales
