= Residents for Uttlesford =

- Chairman: Dan Starr
- Founded: 2014
- Headquarters: Residents for Uttlesford; 3 London Rd, Saffron Walden, CB11 4ED, United Kingdom
- Ideology: Localism
- Colours: Turquoise
- Uttlesford District Council: 19 / 39
- Saffron Walden Town Council: 18 / 18
- Great Dunmow Town Council: 5 / 18
- Essex County Council (Uttlesford seats): 1 / 4

Website
- Residents4U.org

Residents for Uttlesford (R4U) is a localist political party in the United Kingdom. The party was launched in 2014, and formed from a number of residents groups in the area. The party is based in the Uttlesford administrative district in Essex and promotes a localist agenda that seeks to give residents a greater say in the future of their district. Residents for Uttlesford has elected representation at multiple levels of local government: running Uttlesford District Council since 2019, Essex County Council and various town and parish councils, including the councils for both towns in Uttlesford, Saffron Walden and Great Dunmow.

Under R4U, the district lost its powers on major decisions and had its decision to block the expansion of Stansted Airport overturned by the High Court.

== Background ==
The group began as a residents' association in 2011, concerned about planning issues. For the 2013 UK local elections, Uttlesford residents stood two of their own candidates on an independent platform. Both were elected - John Lodge to Essex County Council and Joanna Parry to Uttlesford District Council.

Following this, in 2014 the local residents groups formed their own party, Residents for Uttlesford, so that they could more easily stand a larger number of candidates across the electoral District. A number of existing councillors defected to join the new party when it was launched, including from the Conservatives and Liberal Democrats. They have no whip and instead use consensus.

Residents for Uttlesford cite other successful local independent political parties in the UK as the inspiration for their model, including the Loughton Residents Association in Essex, Residents Associations of Epsom and Ewell in Surrey, and Independents for Frome with their Flatpack Democracy model.

== History ==
Residents for Uttlesford fought their first local elections in May 2015, with candidates standing for seats in both Uttlesford District Council and Saffron Walden Town Council. They won a majority of the seats on the town council and became the opposition in the district council. At the 2015 General Election, the R4U candidate in Saffron Walden came last, prompting them to focus on local elections.

The party gained two additional seats in February 2017 by winning an Uttlesford District Council by-election in the Elsenham and Henham ward with 60% of the votes cast.

In the 2019 Uttlesford District Council election, the party gained control of Uttlesford District Council after winning 26 out of 39 of the available seats, taking 17 seats from the incumbent Conservatives, who came third. This was a "dramatic" example of a national trend of losses of Conservatives to Liberal Democrats and independents over protection of greenbelts. R4U offered the Liberal Democrats cabinet seats, which they declined. They also maintained control of the Saffron Walden Town Council, winning 15 out of the 16 seats. A key policy was opposing the Conservative's Local Plan, especially three new settlements and the insufficient infrastructure for developments. Despite this policy, after being elected they proceeded with the local plan, including plans for the "garden communities" of Easton Park, North Uttlesford, and West of Braintree, in June 2019. In January 2020, planning inspectors asked for the local plan to be withdrawn by R4U.

In the 2021 Essex County Council election, Residents for Uttlesford gained two of the four Essex County Council seats in Uttlesford from the Conservatives. In December, R4U council leader John Lodge stepped down and Petrina Lees became Uttlesford's first female leader; she has said she wants R4U to be a "flagship for district councils", calling national party councillors "little Lego people of Westminster".

In February 2022, Conservative housing minister Christopher Pincher took away the power of the R4U council to make major planning decisions, granting it to the planning Inspectorate under the Town and Country Planning Act 1990, which R4U said was "unwarranted and cynical". This was due to the high number of decisions overturned at appeal. Architects Journal reported that "of 79 major planning applications, 35 were appealed and 13 of the 35 appeals were subsequently allowed." The same month, R4U supported a Liberal Democrat and Green Groups proposal for a council tax rebate for the poorest taxpayers. That June, R4U again delayed the local plan consultation until that November.

R4U presented a vision for the district titled Blueprint Uttlesford in 2023, with opposition councillors walking out of a meeting in March 2023 claiming the plans were undemocratic. R4U retained control of Uttlesford District Council in the May 2023 local elections, down two seats. The party were also returned to lead Saffron Walden Town council for the third term, taking a clean sweep of all 18 of the seats, as well as taking 5 seats at Great Dunmow Town Council. A public consultation on a new local plan to deliver 6,000 ho}es by 2041 was announced in October 2023. R4U councillors did not defend the lack of social housing, noting how an imperfect plan had to proceed due to the existing plan dating to 2005. That December, Conservative minister Michael Gove named R4U as an underperforming administration on planning; R4U leader Petrina Lees said he knew the council would meet the local plan deadline. The last stage of consultation in August 2024 was opposed by the Conservatives and Liberal Democrats. R4U agreed in March 2024 to sell the council's 50% share of Chesterford Research Park, acquired in 2017. In 2025, R4U expressed concern about the financial impact and disruption of the Local Government Reorganisation planned for 2027, which will abolish the County Council and Uttlesford District.

In March 2025 and then in February 2026, first councillor Heather Asker and then councillors Geoff Bagnall and Mark Coletta defected to Reform, reducing R4U to 19 councillors and moving the authority into no overall control. R4U commented that, "The new Local Plan includes development proposals close to the homes of the two councillors who have since defected to Reform." A founding member of R4U, councillor Alexander Armstrong, died in May 2026.

=== Stansted airport expansion ===
Residents for Uttlesford decided in January 2020 to revoke planning permission for the expansion of London Stansted Airport, granted in November 2018 by the previous Conservative administration, on the grounds of climate change and noise and air pollution. The council was lobbied by Stop Stansted Expansion, who wanted the decision rapidly reversed, and the union Unite, who argued a refusal would cost the local economy an estimated £1 billion GBP in investment. Council officers had recommended approval ahead of the planning committee meeting. A public inquiry was held from January to April 2021, examining the decision by R4U in 2020 to go against the advice of council officers and their lawyers. The R4U-led council's decision was overturned in 2021 by the planning inspectorate. In October 2021, the High Court judge Beverley Lang rejected an appeal by the R4U-majority council and ordered the council to pay costs and compensation to Manchester Airports Group and to the Department for Communities and Local Government with the council’s bill expected to exceed £2 million. The council's own legal bill was above £1 million. A July 2022 report by Eversheds Sutherland said the reversal of approval was "politically motivated" and the council CEO said most meetings about the airport were not properly documented. In October 2022, the R4U-led council used its entire Strategic Initiative Fund and over £400,000 in reserves to pay £2.05 million to the airport.

== See also ==
- Maldon District Independent Group
