= South East England Regional Assembly =

- Formation: 1999
- Dissolved: 2009
- Legal status: Regional chamber
- Headquarters: Guildford
- Region served: South East England

South East England Regional Assembly (SEERA) was the regional chamber for the South East England region. Regional Chambers were established by the Regional Development Agencies Act 1998 and their function of consultation was shown in Section 8 of the Act. It was based at Guildford until it was dissolved on 31 March 2009, with its functions being assumed by the South East England Partnership Board, which comprises members of SEEDA board, the Regional Development Agency and the South East England Leaders’ Board, the executive body of South East England Councils.

== Structure ==
Although it was publicly funded, SEERA claimed not to be a public authority and is therefore not subject to the Freedom of Information Act 2000:

"The Regional Assembly was a voluntary regional chamber under the RDA Act 1998. It was not however a public authority and does not therefore fall strictly within the frame of the Freedom of Information Act 2000. The Regional Assembly's business were carried out under the auspices of SEERA Ltd, a not-for-profit company limited by guarantee."

== Members ==
Prior to abolition, SEERA had 111 members, made up as follows:

"There are 73 councillor members representing each of the region's local authorities and three members for town and parish councils. The remaining 38 members represent a range of interests including the voluntary and community sector, business, trade unions, the environment, economic partnerships, health, education, sport, culture, faith groups, town and parish councils and the New Forest National Park Authority."

== See also ==
- South East England Partnership Board
- South East England Development Agency
