= South East England Development Agency =

- Formation: 1999
- Legal status: Regional development agency
- Region served: South East England
- Leadership: Appointed board
- Website: seeda.co.uk
- Remarks: Appointment: Department for Business, Enterprise and Regulatory Reform

The South East England Development Agency (SEEDA) was one of a number of regional development agencies in England. It was set up as a non-departmental public body in 1999 to promote the region and to enable a number of more difficult regeneration projects which otherwise might not take place. It covered Berkshire, Buckinghamshire, East Sussex, Hampshire, the Isle of Wight, Kent, Oxfordshire, Surrey and West Sussex

The government announced that SEEDA was due to close by 31 March 2012, along with the other RDAs (regional development agencies). According to SEEDA's website "Responsibility for economic development and regeneration in England is being passed onto successor bodies, including Local Enterprise Partnerships (LEPs) and central Government departments".

== Projects ==
Projects include:

- A number in the Thames Gateway area;
- Regeneration of the Kent Coalfield;
- Development plans for the Ashford area;
- Rochester Riverside
- A plan for the regeneration of Hastings and Bexhill, including town centre improvements, new housing and the development of a new university;
- The 'Building for Nature' advisory service, which aims to help developers produce projects in the most environmentally-friendly way;
- Helping and advising farmers and rural businesses;
- A broadband programme to ensure more remote businesses and residences have high speed internet access;
- Supporting start-up businesses at enterprise hubs (eventually 30 are planned):
  - Aylesbury Vale Enterprise Hub, based at Buckingham
  - Canterbury Enterprise Hub, based at Canterbury
  - Eastbourne Enterprise Hub, based at Eastbourne
  - Farnborough Enterprise Hub, based at Farnborough and launched July 19, 2006
  - Food Technology Enterprise Hub, based at Reading
  - Gatwick Diamond Enterprise Hub, based at Crawley
  - East Sussex Enterprise Hub, based at Eastbourne and Hastings
  - High Wycombe Enterprise Hub, based at High Wycombe
  - Isle of Wight Enterprise Hub, based at Newport on the Isle of Wight
  - Medway Enterprise Hub, based at Chatham
  - Milton Keynes Enterprise Hub, based at Milton Keynes
  - Newbury Enterprise Hub, based at Newbury
  - Oxfordshire Enterprise Hub, based in Bicester and Harwell
  - Reading Enterprise Hub, based on the Whiteknights Campus of the University of Reading in Reading
  - Sittingbourne Enterprise Hub, based on the Kent Science Park near Sittingbourne
  - Slough Enterprise Hub, based at Slough
  - Solent Enterprise Hub, based at Portsmouth
  - Southampton Enterprise Hub, based at Southampton
  - Surrey Enterprise Hub, based at Guildford
- Supporting existing businesses through 16 'enterprise gateways' (eventually 20 are planned): Adur (based in Shoreham-by-Sea), Arun & Littlehampton (primarily covers Bognor Regis and Littlehampton), Chilterns (based in High Wycombe, gives particular support to bespoke furniture makers), East Kent (based in Dover), Faringdon (covers rural west Oxfordshire), Folkestone, Medway, Milton Keynes, Newhaven, Reading, Romney, Rural Hampshire, Slough, South East Hampshire (covers Fareham, Gosport, Havant and Portsmouth), Southampton and Surrey.

== See also ==
- Thames Gateway
- Regional development agency
- South East England Regional Assembly
