= Town and country planning in England =

Urban planning in England

Town and country planning in England is the land-use planning which applies to England. Planning policy is devolved in the United Kingdom, with policy for England under the overall control of the Ministry of Housing, Communities and Local Government. The principal piece of legislation is the Town and Country Planning Act 1990.

== Background ==
Until devolution took place after 1997, the planning system in the United Kingdom was unitary. It was separately legislated by the UK Government for England and Wales, Scotland and Northern Ireland, but with only subtle differences. New devolved governments outside England provided the potential for the systems to diverge, but it was not until after 2011 that the English system started to noticeably diverge from the devolved countries.

== History ==
=== Regional planning ===
Elements of regional development and economic planning began to be established in England from the mid-1960s onwards. In most of the standard regions, Economic Planning Councils and Boards were set up, comprising appointed members from local authorities, business, trade unions and universities. Associated with projections of large national population growth and following tensions over urban expansion between the large cities and their surrounding counties, in the early 1970s there were produced a number of regional and sub-regional planning studies. The government-sponsored regional institutions continued to operate until abolished by the incoming Conservative government in 1979. However, by the mid-1980s continuing urban growth and allied difficulties caused local authorities in most regions to establish standing conferences to consider regional planning issues. Regional initiatives were bolstered by the 1986 Government Green Paper and 1989 White Paper on The Future of Development Plans, which proposed the introduction of strong regional guidance within the planning system, and by the Government's issuing of Strategic Guidance at a regional level, later termed regional planning guidance (RPG), from 1986 onwards.

Regional planning in England was undertaken for each of the nine regions with a statutory basis between the 1990s and 2010. In the eight English regions outside London, regional assemblies were formed in 1998, and were responsible for physical planning policy through Regional Spatial Strategies (RSS). From 1999, Regional Development Agencies co-ordinated initiatives to improve economic development. The assemblies were effectively replaced by smaller Local Authority Leaders’ Boards between 2008 and 2010, and formally abolished on 31 March 2010. In June 2010, the incoming Coalition Government announced its intentions to abolish regional spatial strategies and return spatial planning powers to local government. In March 2011, the all-party Commons Communities and Local Government Committee published its report on the implications of the abolition of the RSS system. It stated that: "The intended abolition of regional spatial planning strategies leaves a vacuum at the heart of the English planning system which could have profound social, economic and environmental consequences set to last for many years."

== Use classes ==
As of March 2024, the use classes in England are:

- B2 – General industrial
- B8 – Storage or distribution
- C1 – Hotels
- C2 – Residential institutions
- C2A – Secure residential institutions
- C3 – Dwellinghouses
- C4 – House in multiple occupation
- E – Commercial, business and service
- F1 – Learning and non-residential institutions
- F2 – Local community
- Sui generis – No class specified
