= 2015 United Kingdom local elections =

- 7 May 2015

279 of 405 councils in England 6 directly elected mayors
- Turnout: 65%

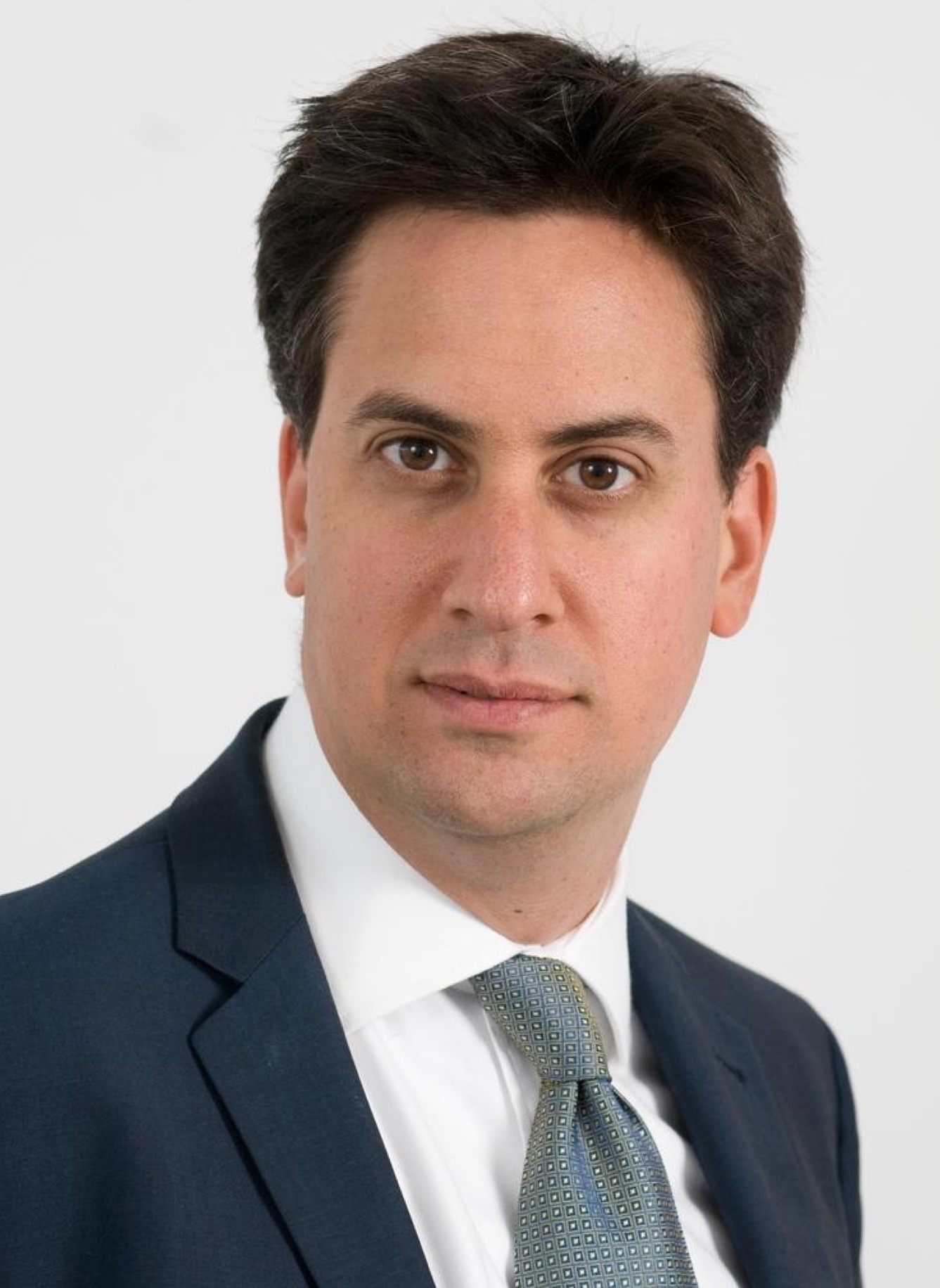

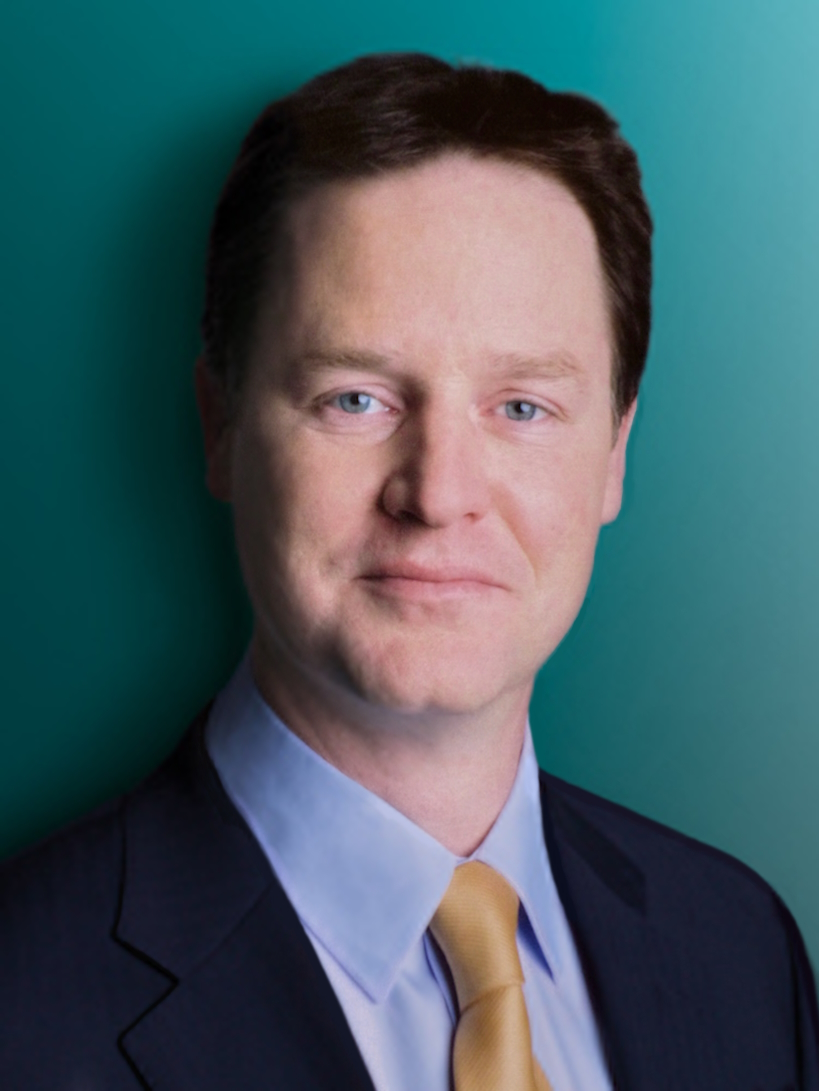

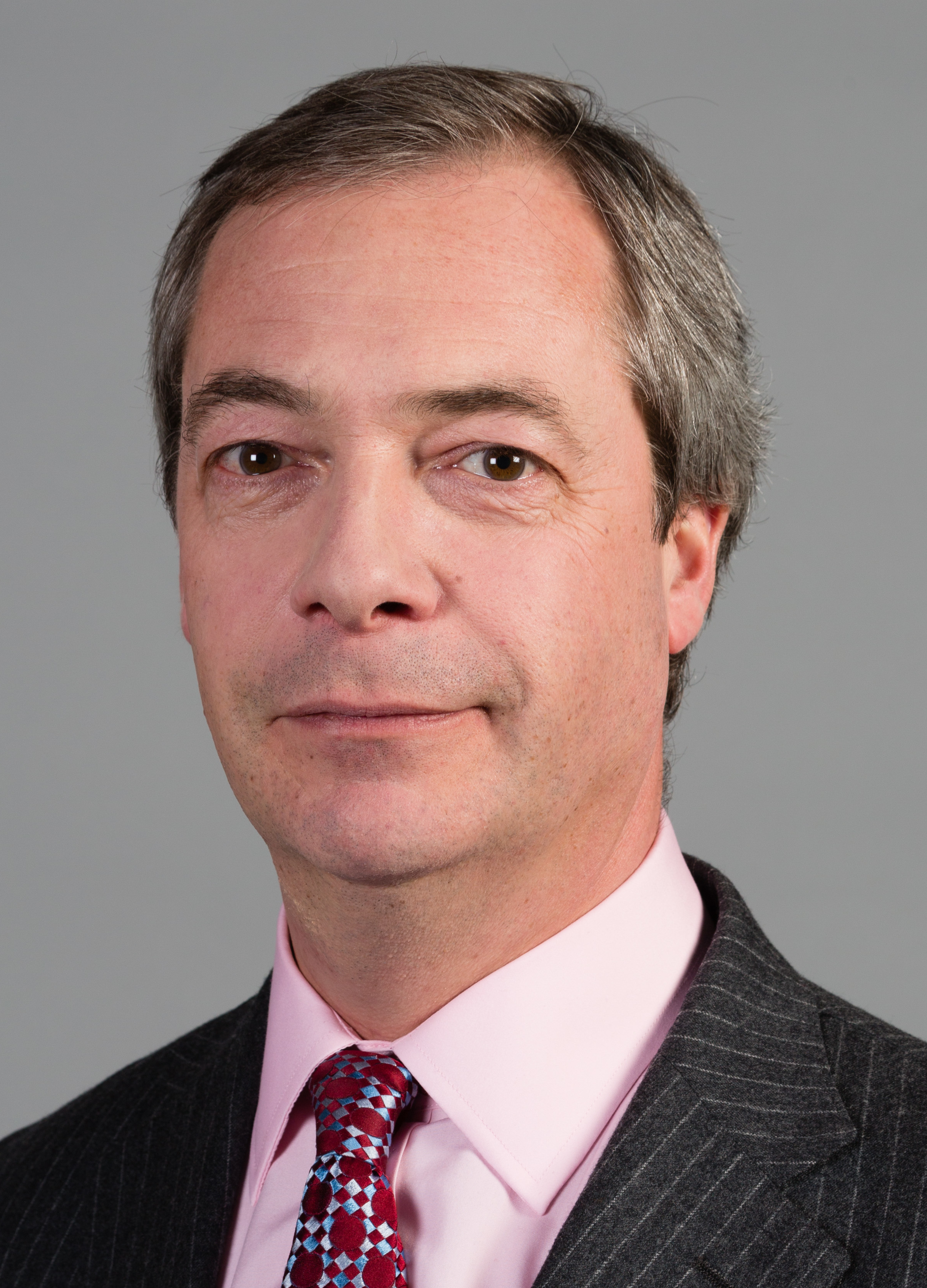
	First party	Second party
Leader	David Cameron	Ed Miliband
Party	Conservative	Labour
Leader since	6 December 2005	25 September 2010
Seats before	8,295 seats 161 councils	7,155 seats 118 councils
Projected vote share (Note: All vote shares in the infobox are projected national vote shares calculated by the BBC.)	35% ▲6%	29% ▼2%
Seats won (2015)	5,521; 163 councils	2,278; 74 councils
Councillors (after)	8,779; 193 councils	6,885; 115 councils
Net change (notional)	▲541 ▲32 councils	▼203 ▼3 councils
	Third party	Fourth party
Leader	Nick Clegg	Nigel Farage
Party	Liberal Democrats	UKIP
Leader since	18 December 2007	5 November 2010
Seats before	2,263 seats 10 councils	369 seats 0 councils
Projected vote share	11% ▼2%	13% ▼4%
Seats won (2015)	658; 4 councils	202; 1 council
Councillors (after)	1,809; 6 councils	496; 1 council
Net change (notional)	▼411 ▼4 councils	▲176 ▲1 council
- The results in England. White areas indicate elections were not held here in 2015.

The 2015 United Kingdom local elections were held on Thursday 7 May 2015, the same day as the general election for the House of Commons.

With the exception of those areas that have had boundary changes, the council seats up for election in England were last contested in the 2011 local elections. To date these are the last local elections to coincide with a general election in the United Kingdom.

== Background ==
Elections would have been due in Northern Ireland given the previous elections to all 26 local councils in 2011, but these councils have since been scrapped and replaced by 11 super-councils, which had their inaugural elections in 2014.

All registered electors (British, Irish, Commonwealth and European Union citizens) who will be aged 18 or over on the day of the election were entitled to vote in the local elections. Those who will be temporarily away from their ordinary address (for example, away working, on holiday, in student accommodation or in hospital) are also entitled to vote in the local elections, although those who have moved abroad and registered as overseas electors cannot vote in the local elections. Those who are registered to vote at more than one address (such as a university student who has a term-time address and lives at home during holidays) are entitled to vote in the local elections at either address, as long as they are not in the same local government area.

== Results ==
Full results as reported by BBC News:

Party	Councillors			Councils		
Party	Won	After	+/- (Note: Because the number of council seats shifts every year due to boundary changes and local government reorganisation, changes are notional changes calculated by the BBC.)	Won	After	+/-
Conservative	5,521	8,779	▲541	163	193	▲32
Labour	2,278	6,885	▼203	74	115	▼3
Liberal Democrats	658	1,809	▼411	4	6	▼4
UKIP	202	496	▲176	1	1	▲1
SNP	—N/a (Note: There were no elections in Scotland in 2015.)	416	Steady	0	2	Steady
Green	87	180	▲10	0	0	Steady
Plaid Cymru	—N/a (Note: There were no elections in Wales in 2015.)	170	Steady	0	0	Steady
Independent	580	1,538	▼132	0	6	Steady
No overall control	—N/a			36	82	▼27
Total	9,326	20,273	—	278	405	—

== Analysis ==
In 2015, direct elections were held in 279 of the 293 local districts in England: 36 metropolitan boroughs, 194 of the second-tier districts, and 49 of the unitary authorities. There were no local elections in London, Scotland, or Wales.

There were also six elections for directly elected mayors, as well as elections to many parish councils and town councils, and a few local referendums.

As was the case in the simultaneously-held general election, the Conservative Party was considered the clear winners of the local elections, winning overall control of more than thirty local councils, mostly from councils that before the election had no overall control (i.e., no majority held by any one party). The Conservatives retained control of the Solihull and Trafford councils, the only two metropolitan boroughs that it held before the election, slightly increasing its majority on both. Among the unitary councils, the Conservatives won control of Bath and North East Somerset for the first time.

As was the case in the general election, the Labour Party and Liberal Democrats performed poorly. Labour lost control of the Walsall metropolitan borough and the Plymouth and Stoke-on-Trent unitary authorities, both to no overall control.

The Green Party of England and Wales lost their status as the largest party on Brighton and Hove City Council to Labour.

The UK Independence Party won control of the Thanet District Council, going from two to 33 seats on that council. This marked the first time that UKIP won control of a local council.

According to an analysis by Colin Rallings and Michael Thrasher, more than three-quarters of councils across the UK are now under the majority control of the two largest parties, Conservative and Labour—the highest percentage since the 1970s local government reform. The dominance of the Conservative and Labour parties was not limited to control of councils, but also extended to a seat count, with the two parties holding 77% of seats, the highest since 1980. Rallings and Thrasher found that the decline of the Liberal Democrats accounted for part of this trend. They concluded that "much is said about multi-party Britain but it is time instead to talk about two-party local government."

== Metropolitan boroughs ==
In 35 of the 36 English metropolitan borough councils, one-third of their seats were up for re-election. In Doncaster, all seats were up for re-election due to ward-boundary changes there.

Council	Previous control	Result	Details
Barnsley	Labour	Labour	Details
Birmingham	Labour	Labour	Details
Bolton	Labour	Labour	Details
Bradford	Labour	Labour	Details
Bury	Labour	Labour	Details
Calderdale	No overall control (Con-Ind coalition with LD support)	No overall control (Lab minority)	Details
Coventry	Labour	Labour	Details
Doncaster	Labour	Labour	Details
Dudley	Labour	Labour	Details
Gateshead	Labour	Labour	Details
Kirklees	No overall control (Labour minority)	No overall control (Labour minority)	Details
Knowsley	Labour	Labour	Details
Leeds	Labour	Labour	Details
Liverpool	Labour	Labour	Details
Manchester	Labour	Labour	Details
Newcastle upon Tyne	Labour	Labour	Details
North Tyneside	Labour	Labour	Details
Oldham	Labour	Labour	Details
Rochdale	Labour	Labour	Details
Rotherham	Labour	Labour	Details
St Helens	Labour	Labour	Details
Salford	Labour	Labour	Details
Sandwell	Labour	Labour	Details
Sefton	Labour	Labour	Details
Sheffield	Labour	Labour	Details
Solihull	Conservative	Conservative	Details
South Tyneside	Labour	Labour	Details
Stockport	No overall control (LibDem-Ind minority)	No overall control (LibDem-Ind minority)	Details
Sunderland	Labour	Labour	Details
Tameside	Labour	Labour	Details
Trafford	Conservative	Conservative	Details
Wakefield	Labour	Labour	Details
Walsall	No overall control (Labour minority)	No overall control (Labour minority)	Details
Wigan	Labour	Labour	Details
Wirral	Labour	Labour	Details
Wolverhampton	Labour	Labour	Details

== Unitary authorities ==
=== Whole council ===
In 30 English unitary authorities the whole council was up for election.

These were the last elections to the unitary authorities for Bournemouth and Poole, as they are set to be merged into one, along with the area covered by Christchurch District Council into one new authority in 2019.

Council	Previous control	Result	Details
Bath and North East Somerset	No overall control	Conservative	Details
Bedford	No overall control	No overall control (Lab-LibDem coalition)	Details
Blackpool	Labour	Labour	Details
Bournemouth	Conservative	Conservative	Details
Bracknell Forest	Conservative	Conservative	Details
Brighton and Hove	No overall control (Green minority)	No overall control (Labour minority)	Details
Central Bedfordshire	Conservative	Conservative	Details
Cheshire East	Conservative	Conservative	Details
Cheshire West and Chester	Conservative	Labour	Details
Darlington	Labour	Labour	Details
East Riding of Yorkshire	Conservative	Conservative	Details
Herefordshire	No overall control	Conservative	Details
Leicester	Labour	Labour	Details
Luton	Labour	Labour	Details
Medway	Conservative	Conservative	Details
Middlesbrough	Labour	Labour	Details
North Lincolnshire	Conservative	Conservative	Details
North Somerset	Conservative	Conservative	Details
Nottingham	Labour	Labour	Details
Poole	No overall control	Conservative	Details
Redcar and Cleveland	No overall control	No overall control (Labour minority)	Details
Rutland	Conservative	Conservative	Details
South Gloucestershire	No overall control	Conservative	Details
Stockton-on-Tees	No overall control	Labour	Details
Stoke-on-Trent	Labour	No overall control (Ind-Con-UKIP coalition)	Details
Telford and Wrekin	Labour	No overall control (Labour minority)	Details
Torbay	Conservative	Conservative	Details
West Berkshire	Conservative	Conservative	Details
Windsor and Maidenhead	Conservative	Conservative	Details
York	Labour	No overall control (Con-LibDem coalition)	Details

=== Third of council ===
In 19 English unitary authorities one third of the council was up for election.

Council	Previous control	Result	Details
Blackburn with Darwen	Labour	Labour	Details
Bristol	No overall control	No overall control (Lab minority)	Details
Derby	Labour	Labour	Details
Halton	Labour	Labour	Details
Hartlepool	Labour	Labour	Details
Kingston upon Hull	Labour	Labour	Details
Milton Keynes	No overall control	No overall control (Lab minority)	Details
North East Lincolnshire	No overall control	No overall control (Lab-LibDem coalition)	Details
Peterborough	No overall control	No overall control (Con minority)	Details
Plymouth	Labour	No overall control (Lab-Con coalition)	Details
Portsmouth	No overall control (Con with UKIP & Lab support)	No overall control (Con with UKIP support)	Details
Reading	Labour	Labour	Details
Slough	Labour	Labour	Details
Southampton	Labour	Labour	Details
Southend-on-Sea	No overall control (Ind-Lab-LibDem coalition)	No overall control (Ind-Lab-LibDem coalition)	Details
Swindon	Conservative	Conservative	Details
Thurrock	No overall control (Lab with UKIP support)	No overall control (Lab minority)	Details
Warrington	Labour	Labour	Details
Wokingham	Conservative	Conservative	Details

== Non-metropolitan districts ==
=== Whole council ===
In 128 English district authorities the whole council was up for election.

These were the last elections to councils in Christchurch, Corby, East Dorset, East Northamptonshire, Forest Heath, Kettering, North Dorset, Northampton, Purbeck, South Northamptonshire, St Edmundsbury, Suffolk Coastal, Taunton Deane, Waveney, Wellingborough, West Dorset and West Somerset.

These councils are either being merged into larger districts, specifically those in Somerset and Suffolk at the 2019 local elections, while those in Northamptonshire and Dorset are due to have their county councils abolished and converted into 4 unitary authorities, with the new Dorset authorities electing in 2019 and the Northamptonshire authorities electing in 2020 - thus meaning all of the district and borough councillors in Northamptonshire have their terms extended for one year.

Council	Previous control	Result	Details
Allerdale	No overall control (Labour minority)	No overall control (Labour minority)	Details
Arun	Conservative	Conservative	Details
Ashfield	Labour	Labour	Details
Ashford	Conservative	Conservative	Details
Aylesbury Vale	Conservative	Conservative	Details
Babergh	No overall control	Conservative	Details
Barrow-in-Furness	Labour	Labour	Details
Bassetlaw	Labour	Labour	Details
Blaby	Conservative	Conservative	Details
Bolsover	Labour	Labour	Details
Boston	Conservative	No overall control (Con-Ind coalition)	Details
Braintree	Conservative	Conservative	Details
Breckland	Conservative	Conservative	Details
Broadland	Conservative	Conservative	Details
Bromsgrove	Conservative	Conservative	Details
Broxtowe	No overall control	Conservative	Details
Canterbury	Conservative	Conservative	Details
Charnwood	Conservative	Conservative	Details
Chelmsford	Conservative	Conservative	Details
Chesterfield	Labour	Labour	Details
Chichester	Conservative	Conservative	Details
Chiltern	Conservative	Conservative	Details
Christchurch	Conservative	Conservative	Details
Copeland	Labour	Labour	Details
Corby	Labour	Labour	Details
Cotswold	Conservative	Conservative	Details
Dacorum	Conservative	Conservative	Details
Dartford	Conservative	Conservative	Details
Derbyshire Dales	Conservative	Conservative	Details
Dover	Conservative	Conservative	Details
Eastbourne	Liberal Democrats	Liberal Democrats	Details
East Cambridgeshire	Conservative	Conservative	Details
East Devon	Conservative	Conservative	Details
East Dorset	Conservative	Conservative	Details
East Hampshire	Conservative	Conservative	Details
East Hertfordshire	Conservative	Conservative	Details
East Lindsey	No overall control	Conservative	Details
East Northamptonshire	Conservative	Conservative	Details
East Staffordshire	No overall control	Conservative	Details
Eden	No overall control	Conservative	Details
Epsom and Ewell	Residents Association	Residents Association	Details
Erewash	Conservative	Conservative	Details
Fenland	Conservative	Conservative	Details
Forest Heath	Conservative	Conservative	Details
Forest of Dean	No overall control (Conservative minority)	No overall control (Conservative minority)	Details
Fylde	Conservative	Conservative	Details
Gedling	Labour	Labour	Details
Gravesham	Labour	Conservative	Details
Guildford	Conservative	Conservative	Details
Hambleton	Conservative	Conservative	Details
Harborough	Conservative	Conservative	Details
High Peak	No overall control	Conservative	Details
Hinckley and Bosworth	Liberal Democrats	Conservative	Details
Horsham	Conservative	Conservative	Details
Kettering	Conservative	Conservative	Details
King's Lynn and West Norfolk	Conservative	Conservative	Details
Lancaster	No overall control (Labour-Green coalition)	No overall control (Labour minority)	Details
Lewes	No overall control	Conservative	Details
Lichfield	Conservative	Conservative	Details
Maldon	Conservative	Conservative	Details
Malvern Hills	Conservative	Conservative	Details
Mansfield	Labour	Labour	Details
Melton	Conservative	Conservative	Details
Mendip	Conservative	Conservative	Details
Mid Devon	Conservative	Conservative	Details
Mid Suffolk	Conservative	Conservative	Details
Mid Sussex	Conservative	Conservative	Details
New Forest	Conservative	Conservative	Details
Newark and Sherwood	No overall control	Conservative	Details
North Devon	No overall control (LibDem-Ind coalition)	No overall control (Con-Ind coalition)	Details
North Dorset	Conservative	Conservative	Details
North East Derbyshire	Labour	Labour	Details
North Kesteven	Conservative	Conservative	Details
North Norfolk	Conservative	Conservative	Details
North Warwickshire	Labour	Conservative	Details
North West Leicestershire	Conservative	Conservative	Details
Northampton	Conservative	Conservative	Details
Oadby and Wigston	Liberal Democrats	Liberal Democrats	Details
Purbeck	No overall control	Conservative	Details
Ribble Valley	Conservative	Conservative	Details
Richmondshire	No overall control	Conservative	Details
Rother	Conservative	Conservative	Details
Rushcliffe	Conservative	Conservative	Details
Ryedale	Conservative	Conservative	Details
Scarborough	No overall control	Conservative	Details
Sedgemoor	Conservative	Conservative	Details
Selby	Conservative	Conservative	Details
Sevenoaks	Conservative	Conservative	Details
Shepway	Conservative	Conservative	Details
South Bucks	Conservative	Conservative	Details
South Derbyshire	Conservative	Conservative	Details
South Hams	Conservative	Conservative	Details
South Holland	Conservative	Conservative	Details
South Kesteven	Conservative	Conservative	Details
South Norfolk	Conservative	Conservative	Details
South Northamptonshire	Conservative	Conservative	Details
South Oxfordshire	Conservative	Conservative	Details
South Ribble	Conservative	Conservative	Details
South Somerset	Liberal Democrats	No overall control (LibDem-Ind coalition)	Details
South Staffordshire	Conservative	Conservative	Details
Spelthorne	Conservative	Conservative	Details
St Edmundsbury	Conservative	Conservative	Details
Stafford	Conservative	Conservative	Details
Staffordshire Moorlands	No overall control	Conservative	Details
Stratford-on-Avon	Conservative	Conservative	Details
Suffolk Coastal	Conservative	Conservative	Details
Surrey Heath	Conservative	Conservative	Details
Swale	Conservative	Conservative	Details
Taunton Deane	No overall control	Conservative	Details
Teignbridge	Conservative	Conservative	Details
Tendring	Conservative	No overall control (Con-Ind coalition)	Details
Test Valley	Conservative	Conservative	Details
Tewkesbury	Conservative	Conservative	Details
Thanet	No overall control	UKIP	Details
Tonbridge and Malling	Conservative	Conservative	Details
Torridge	No overall control	Conservative	Details
Uttlesford	Conservative	Conservative	Details
Vale of White Horse	Conservative	Conservative	Details
Warwick	Conservative	Conservative	Details
Waveney	No overall control	Conservative	Details
Waverley	Conservative	Conservative	Details
Wealden	Conservative	Conservative	Details
Wellingborough	Conservative	Conservative	Details
West Devon	Conservative	Conservative	Details
West Dorset	Conservative	Conservative	Details
West Lindsey	Conservative	Conservative	Details
West Somerset	Conservative	Conservative	Details
Wychavon	Conservative	Conservative	Details
Wycombe	Conservative	Conservative	Details
Wyre	Conservative	Conservative	Details
Wyre Forest	No overall control	Conservative	Details

=== Third of council ===
In 66 English district authorities one third of the council was up for election.

Council	Previous control	Result	Details
Amber Valley	Labour	Conservative	Details
Basildon	No overall control (Con-UKIP coalition)	No overall control (Con minority)	Details
Basingstoke and Deane	No overall control	Conservative	Details
Brentwood	No overall control	Conservative	Details
Broxbourne	Conservative	Conservative	Details
Burnley	Labour	Labour	Details
Cambridge	Labour	Labour	Details
Cannock Chase	Labour	Labour	Details
Carlisle	Labour	Labour	Details
Castle Point	Conservative	Conservative	Details
Cherwell	Conservative	Conservative	Details
Chorley	Labour	Labour	Details
Colchester	No overall control (LibDem-Lab-Ind Coalition)	No overall control (LibDem-Lab-Ind Coalition)	Details
Craven	Conservative	Conservative	Details
Crawley	Labour	Labour	Details
Daventry	Conservative	Conservative	Details
Eastleigh	Liberal Democrats	Liberal Democrats	Details
Elmbridge	Conservative	Conservative	Details
Epping Forest	Conservative	Conservative	Details
Exeter	Labour	Labour	Details
Gloucester	No overall control	Conservative	Details
Great Yarmouth	No overall control (Lab minority)	No overall control (Lab minority)	Details
Harlow	Labour	Labour	Details
Harrogate	Conservative	Conservative	Details
Hart	No overall control	Conservative	Details
Havant	Conservative	Conservative	Details
Hertsmere	Conservative	Conservative	Details
Huntingdonshire	Conservative	Conservative	Details
Hyndburn	Labour	Labour	Details
Ipswich	Labour	Labour	Details
Lincoln	Labour	Labour	Details
Maidstone	No overall control (Con minority)	No overall control (LibDem-Ind minority)	Details
Mole Valley	No overall control	Conservative	Details
Newcastle-under-Lyme	Labour	No overall control (Lab minority)	Details
North Hertfordshire	Conservative	Conservative	Details
Norwich	Labour	Labour	Details
Pendle	No overall control (Con-LibDem coalition)	No overall control (Con-LibDem coalition)	Details
Preston	Labour	Labour	Details
Redditch	Labour	Labour	Details
Reigate and Banstead	Conservative	Conservative	Details
Rochford	Conservative	Conservative	Details
Rossendale	Labour	Labour	Details
Rugby	Conservative	Conservative	Details
Runnymede	Conservative	Conservative	Details
Rushmoor	Conservative	Conservative	Details
St Albans	No overall control	Conservative	Details
South Cambridgeshire	Conservative	Conservative	Details
South Lakeland	Liberal Democrats	Liberal Democrats	Details
Stevenage	Labour	Labour	Details
Stroud	No overall control (Lab-Green-LibDem coalition)	No overall control (Lab-Green-LibDem coalition)	Details
Tamworth	Conservative	Conservative	Details
Tandridge	Conservative	Conservative	Details
Three Rivers	Liberal Democrats	No overall control (Con minority w/ Lab support)	Details
Tunbridge Wells	Conservative	Conservative	Details
Watford	Liberal Democrats	No overall control (LibDem minority)	Details
Welwyn Hatfield	Conservative	Conservative	Details
West Lancashire	No overall control	Labour	Details
West Oxfordshire	Conservative	Conservative	Details
Weymouth and Portland	No overall control (Lab minority)	No overall control (Con minority)	Details
Winchester	No overall control	Conservative	Details
Woking	Conservative	Conservative	Details
Worcester	No overall control	Conservative	Details
Worthing	Conservative	Conservative	Details

== Mayoral elections ==
Six direct mayoral elections were held.

Local Authority	Previous Mayor	Mayor-elect
Bedford	Dave Hodgson (Liberal Democrats)	Dave Hodgson (Liberal Democrats)
Copeland	New Post	Mike Starkie (Independent)
Leicester	Sir Peter Soulsby (Labour)	Sir Peter Soulsby (Labour)
Mansfield	Tony Egginton (Mansfield Independent Forum)	Kate Allsop (Mansfield Independent Forum)
Middlesbrough	Ray Mallon (Independent)	Dave Budd (Labour)
Torbay	Gordon Oliver (Conservative)	Gordon Oliver (Conservative)

== Local referendums results ==
A local referendum in Bedfordshire was held on a proposal by Bedfordshire Police and Crime Commissioner Olly Martins, to fund one hundred additional police officers through a 15.8% increase in the police precept (the portion of the council tax set by the police and crime commissioner). The proposal would provide an additional £4.5 million in revenue. The referendum was triggered because the proposed tax increase was above the 2% threshold. Voters decisively rejected the proposal, with 30.5% (91,086 votes) voting yes and 69.5% (207,551 votes) no.
