= 2015 Bolton Metropolitan Borough Council election =

Local election in Greater Manchester, England

Results of the 2015 Bolton Metropolitan Borough Council election

The 2015 Bolton Metropolitan Borough Council election was held on 7 May 2015 to elect members of Bolton Metropolitan Borough Council in Greater Manchester, England. This took place on the same day as other local elections

22 seats were contested, including 2 seats in the Heaton and Lostock ward following the retirement of Conservative Councillor Alan Rushton, and 2 seats in Westhoughton North following the resignation of Labour Councillor Sean Harkin. The Labour Party won 14 seats, the Conservatives won 6 seats, UKIP won 1 seat and the Liberal Democrats won 1 seat.

After the election, the total composition of the council was as follows:

- Labour 39
- Conservative 15
- UK Independence Party 3
- Liberal Democrats 3.

== Election result ==
Bolton local election result 2015
| Party | Seats | Gains | Losses | Net gain/loss | Seats % | Votes % | Votes | +/− |
|---|---|---|---|---|---|---|---|---|
| Labour | 14 | 1 | 2 | -1 | 63.7 | 38.9 | 53,604 | -1.4 |
| Conservative | 6 | 1 | 1 | 0 | 27.3 | 29.9 | 41,227 | +7.3 |
| UKIP | 1 | 1 | 0 | +1 | 4.5 | 18.5 | 25,505 | -6.8 |
| Liberal Democrats | 1 | 0 | 0 | 0 | 4.5 | 7.3 | 10,127 | +0.2 |
| Green | 0 | 0 | 0 | 0 | 0.0 | 3.9 | 5,336 | +0.4 |
| Independent | 0 | 0 | 0 | 0 | 0.0 | 1.5 | 2,021 | +0.5 |

== Council Composition ==
Prior to the election the composition of the council was:

↓
| 40 | 15 | 3 | 2 |
| Labour | Conservative | LD | U |

After the election the composition of the council was:

↓
| 39 | 15 | 3 | 3 |
| Labour | Conservative | LD | U |

LD - Liberal Democrats
U - UKIP

== Ward results ==
=== Astley Bridge ward ===
Astley Bridge ward
| Party | Candidate | Votes | % | ±% |
|---|---|---|---|---|
| Conservative | Paul Wild | 2,963 | 41.4 | +5.1 |
| Labour | Debbie Newall | 2129 | 29.7 | −1.7 |
| UKIP | Harry Lamb | 1500 | 21.0 | −4.6 |
| Liberal Democrats | Clive Atty | 302 | 4.2 | +2.1 |
| Green | Ben Deed | 261 | 3.6 | −0.9 |
| Majority | | 834 | 11.6 | +6.6 |
| Turnout | | 7,155 | 68.1 | +27.7 |
| Conservative hold | | Swing | UKIP to Conservative 4.8 | |

=== Bradshaw ward ===
Bradshaw ward
| Party | Candidate | Votes | % | ±% |
|---|---|---|---|---|
| Conservative | Stuart Haslam | 3,245 | 50.7 | +7.0 |
| Labour | Tony Shepherd | 1519 | 23.7 | +2.0 |
| UKIP | Helen Turner | 1065 | 16.6 | −9.1 |
| Green | Joshua Handley | 212 | 3.3 | +2.5 |
| Liberal Democrats | Gaby McDowall | 199 | 3.1 | −1.6 |
| Independent | Eric Hyland | 159 | 2.5 | +2.5 |
| Majority | | 1,726 | 27.0 | +9.0 |
| Turnout | | 6,399 | 71.3 | +30.4 |
| Conservative hold | | Swing | UKIP to Conservative 8.0 | |

=== Breightmet ward ===
Breightmet ward
| Party | Candidate | Votes | % | ±% |
|---|---|---|---|---|
| Labour | John Byrne | 2,323 | 40.9 | −2.1 |
| UKIP | Steven Flatman | 1557 | 27.4 | −7.7 |
| Conservative | Ryan Haslam | 1402 | 24.7 | +8.0 |
| Green | Laura Diggle | 244 | 4.3 | +1.0 |
| Liberal Democrats | Stephen Howarth | 153 | 2.7 | +1.2 |
| Majority | | 766 | 13.5 | +5.6 |
| Turnout | | 5,679 | 59.3 | +22.3 |
| Labour hold | | Swing | UKIP to Conservative 7.8 | |

=== Bromley Cross ward ===
Bromley Cross ward
| Party | Candidate | Votes | % | ±% |
|---|---|---|---|---|
| Conservative | Norman Critchley | 4,340 | 56.0 | +2.4 |
| Labour Co-op | Neil Garrity | 1589 | 20.4 | −1.8 |
| UKIP | Brett Varnam | 1057 | 13.6 | −6.7 |
| Green | Liz Spencer | 424 | 5.4 | +5.4 |
| Liberal Democrats | Chris Atty | 368 | 4.7 | +0.6 |
| Majority | | 2,751 | 35.4 | +4.0 |
| Turnout | | 7,778 | 73.3 | +32.6 |
| Conservative hold | | Swing | UKIP to Conservative 4.5 | |

=== Crompton ward ===
Crompton ward
| Party | Candidate | Votes | % | ±% |
|---|---|---|---|---|
| Labour | Guy Harkin | 3,895 | 63.0 | +3.0 |
| Conservative | Nadim Muslim | 1343 | 21.7 | +10.1 |
| Liberal Democrats | Anne Warren | 641 | 10.4 | +6.6 |
| Green | Farhan Patel | 306 | 4.9 | +4.9 |
| Majority | | 2,552 | 41.3 | +2.0 |
| Turnout | | 6,185 | 60.3 | +21.0 |
| Labour hold | | Swing | UKIP to Conservative 15.5 | |

=== Farnworth ward ===
Farnworth ward
| Party | Candidate | Votes | % | ±% |
|---|---|---|---|---|
| Labour | Jean Gillies | 2,703 | 50.3 | +1.4 |
| UKIP | Jeff Armstrong | 1626 | 30.2 | −7.1 |
| Conservative | Aidan Meagan | 723 | 13.4 | +6.3 |
| Green | Trevor Bonfield | 178 | 3.3 | −0.6 |
| Liberal Democrats | David Connor | 144 | 2.7 | +0.2 |
| Majority | | 1,077 | 20.0 | +8.3 |
| Turnout | | 5,374 | 49.5 | +21.4 |
| Labour hold | | Swing | UKIP to Conservative 6.7 | |

=== Great Lever ward ===
Great Lever ward
| Party | Candidate | Votes | % | ±% |
|---|---|---|---|---|
| Labour | Madeline Murray | 3,542 | 66.9 | −1.7 |
| UKIP | Paul Eccles | 779 | 14.7 | +0.4 |
| Conservative | Mohammed Waqas | 658 | 12.4 | +2.8 |
| Green | Helen Dickson | 189 | 3.6 | +0.0 |
| Liberal Democrats | Duncan Macpherson | 126 | 2.4 | +0.6 |
| Majority | | 2,763 | 52.2 | −2.4 |
| Turnout | | 5,294 | 55.5 | +18.9 |
| Labour hold | | Swing | Labour to Conservative 2.2 | |

=== Halliwell ward ===
Halliwell ward
| Party | Candidate | Votes | % | ±% |
|---|---|---|---|---|
| Labour | Linda Thomas | 3,121 | 63.1 | −3.0 |
| UKIP | Sandra Harvey | 886 | 17.9 | +0.1 |
| Conservative | Iqraa Shahid | 489 | 9.9 | +3.4 |
| Green | Ian McHugh | 207 | 4.2 | −0.9 |
| Liberal Democrats | Christine Macpherson | 123 | 2.5 | −0.3 |
| Independent | Roheel Iqbal | 117 | 1.7 | +1.2 |
| Majority | | 2,235 | 45.2 | −3.4 |
| Turnout | | 4,943 | 55.1 | +16.8 |
| Labour hold | | Swing | Labour to Conservative 3.2 | |

=== Harper Green ward ===
Harper Green ward
| Party | Candidate | Votes | % | ±% |
|---|---|---|---|---|
| Labour | Susan Haworth | 2,875 | 51.5 | −5.1 |
| UKIP | Dave Harvey | 1549 | 27.7 | +3.7 |
| Conservative | Robert Tyler | 845 | 15.1 | +3.0 |
| Green | Elizabeth McManus | 165 | 2.9 | −0.9 |
| Liberal Democrats | Wendy Connor | 152 | 2.7 | −0.1 |
| Majority | | 1,330 | 23.8 | −9.0 |
| Turnout | | 5,590 | 56.3 | +24.9 |
| Labour hold | | Swing | Labour to UKIP 4.4 | |

=== Heaton and Lostock ward ===
Two seats were up for election in this ward.

Heaton and Lostock ward
| Party | Candidate | Votes | % | ±% |
|---|---|---|---|---|
| Conservative | Bob Allen | 4,299 | 30.5 | |
| Conservative | Andy Morgan | 3,352 | 23.7 | |
| Labour | Julia Silvester | 1649 | 11.7 | |
| Labour | Ibrahim Ismail | 1629 | 11.5 | |
| UKIP | David Butler | 1088 | 7.7 | |
| UKIP | Paula Hendrie | 748 | 5.3 | |
| Liberal Democrats | Rebekah Fairhurst | 485 | 3.4 | |
| Green | Hannah Middleshaw | 468 | 3.3 | |
| Liberal Democrats | Francine Godfrey | 394 | 2.8 | |
| Conservative hold | | | | |
| Conservative hold | | | | |

=== Horwich and Blackrod ward ===
Horwich and Blackrod ward
| Party | Candidate | Votes | % | ±% |
|---|---|---|---|---|
| Labour | Stephen Pickup | 2,559 | 37.5 | |
| Conservative | Carol Forshaw | 2125 | 31.1 | |
| UKIP | Derek Snowden | 1476 | 21.6 | |
| Liberal Democrats | Doug Bagnall | 339 | 5.0 | |
| Green | Keith Cocker | 331 | 4.8 | |
| Majority | | 434 | 6.3 | |
| Turnout | | 6,830 | 66.3 | |
| Labour hold | | | | |

=== Horwich North East ward ===
Horwich North East ward
| Party | Candidate | Votes | % | ±% |
|---|---|---|---|---|
| Labour | Joyce Kellett | 2,040 | 29.6 | −5.8 |
| Conservative | Anne Galloway | 1696 | 24.6 | +4.8 |
| UKIP | Bob Horsfield | 1033 | 15.0 | −8.7 |
| Liberal Democrats | Stephen Rock | 936 | 13.3 | −1.9 |
| Independent | Marie Brady | 922 | 13.4 | +13.4 |
| Green | Roderick Riesco | 260 | 3.8 | −1.6 |
| Majority | | 344 | 5.2 | −6.5 |
| Turnout | | 6,887 | 67.8 | +29.9 |
| Labour hold | | Swing | UKIP to Conservative 7.0 | |

=== Hulton ward ===
Hulton ward
| Party | Candidate | Votes | % | ±% |
|---|---|---|---|---|
| Labour | Shafaqat Shaikh | 2,126 | 33.7 | +3.9 |
| Conservative | Phil Ashcroft | 1961 | 31.1 | +1.1 |
| UKIP | Joan Johnson | 1818 | 28.8 | −4.9 |
| Liberal Democrats | David Cooper | 202 | 3.2 | +1.4 |
| Green | James Tomkinson | 201 | 3.2 | −1.0 |
| Majority | | 165 | 2.6 | |
| Turnout | | 6,308 | 63.5 | +24.3 |
| Labour gain from Conservative | | Swing | UKIP to Labour 4.4 | |

=== Kearsley ward ===
Kearsley ward
| Party | Candidate | Votes | % | ±% |
|---|---|---|---|---|
| Labour | Liam Irving | 2,331 | 37.6 | +1.9 |
| UKIP | Mark Cunningham | 1953 | 31.5 | −2.9 |
| Conservative | Sandra Macneill | 1053 | 17.0 | +8.3 |
| Liberal Democrats | Margaret Rothwell | 590 | 9.5 | −1.4 |
| Green | Graham Robert Marsden | 271 | 4.4 | +4.4 |
| Majority | | 378 | 6.1 | +4.8 |
| Turnout | | 6,198 | 58.9 | +28.2 |
| Labour hold | | Swing | UKIP to Conservative 5.5 | |

=== Little Lever and Darcy Lever ward ===
Little Lever and Darcy Lever ward
| Party | Candidate | Votes | % | ±% |
|---|---|---|---|---|
| UKIP | Sean Hornby | 2,050 | 31.7 | −1.5 |
| Labour | Anthony Connell | 2011 | 31.1 | +3.3 |
| Conservative | Rees Gibbon | 1414 | 21.9 | +4.5 |
| Liberal Democrats | Eric Hyde | 782 | 12.1 | −5.4 |
| Green | Ed Dunsdon | 198 | 3.1 | −0.8 |
| Majority | | 39 | 0.6 | −4.8 |
| Turnout | | 6,455 | 65.9 | +26.4 |
| UKIP gain from Labour | | Swing | Lib Dem to Conservative 4.9 | |

=== Rumworth ward ===
Rumworth ward
| Party | Candidate | Votes | % | ±% |
|---|---|---|---|---|
| Labour | Ebrahim Adia | 4,555 | 77.3 | +4.8 |
| Conservative | Jack Heyes | 747 | 12.7 | +4.7 |
| Green | Alan Johnson | 457 | 7.7 | +2.7 |
| Liberal Democrats | Jaleh Hayes | 136 | 2.3 | +0.6 |
| Majority | | 3,808 | 64.6 | +4.3 |
| Turnout | | 5,895 | 59.0 | +19.2 |
| Labour hold | | Swing | UKIP to Labour 8.6 | |

=== Smithills ward ===
Smithills ward
| Party | Candidate | Votes | % | ±% |
|---|---|---|---|---|
| Liberal Democrats | Carole Swarbrick | 2,563 | 36.8 | −0.7 |
| Labour Co-op | John Gillatt | 1915 | 27.5 | −2.3 |
| Conservative | Danny Haslam | 1161 | 16.7 | +7.1 |
| UKIP | Dot Sexton | 1094 | 15.7 | −3.9 |
| Green | Richard Middleshaw | 233 | 3.3 | +0.2 |
| Majority | | 648 | 9.3 | +1.6 |
| Turnout | | 6,964 | 68.1 | +22.7 |
| Liberal Democrats hold | | Swing | UKIP to Conservative 5.5 | |

=== Tonge with the Haulgh ward ===
Tonge with the Haulgh ward
| Party | Candidate | Votes | % | ±% |
|---|---|---|---|---|
| Labour | Elaine Sherrington | 2,263 | 42.8 | −0.5 |
| UKIP | Derek Fisher | 1675 | 31.7 | −0.9 |
| Conservative | Naima Dean | 968 | 18.3 | +3.2 |
| Green | Imran Atcha | 199 | 3.8 | +1.0 |
| Liberal Democrats | Paul Harasiwka | 176 | 3.3 | +1.3 |
| Majority | | 588 | 11.1 | +0.4 |
| Turnout | | 5,281 | 56.9 | +20.6 |
| Labour hold | | Swing | UKIP to Conservative 2.0 | |

=== Westhoughton North and Chew Moor ward ===
Two seats were up for election in this ward.

Westhoughton North and Chew Moor ward
| Party | Candidate | Votes | % | ±% |
|---|---|---|---|---|
| Conservative | Zoe Kirk-Robinson | 2,517 | 20.6 | |
| Labour | Anne Graham | 2,352 | 19.3 | |
| Conservative | Christine Wild | 2131 | 17.5 | |
| Labour | Chris Peacock | 1977 | 16.2 | |
| UKIP | George Bown | 948 | 7.8 | |
| Independent | Jack Speight | 823 | 6.7 | |
| Liberal Democrats | Derek Gradwell | 433 | 3.5 | |
| Liberal Democrats | John Ainscough | 402 | 3.3 | |
| Green | Heather Rylance | 308 | 2.5 | |
| UKIP | Stephen Thomas | 306 | 2.5 | |
| Conservative gain from Labour | | | | |
| Labour hold | | | | |

=== Westhoughton South ward ===
Westhoughton South ward
| Party | Candidate | Votes | % | ±% |
|---|---|---|---|---|
| Labour | David Chadwick | 2,501 | 39.7 | +0.4 |
| Conservative | Stephen Wallen | 1795 | 28.5 | +11.1 |
| UKIP | Michael Harvey | 1297 | 20.6 | −7.8 |
| Liberal Democrats | David Wilkinson | 481 | 7.6 | −3.6 |
| Green | Alex Conn | 224 | 3.5 | +3.5 |
| Majority | | 706 | 11.2 | +0.3 |
| Turnout | | 6,298 | 64.4 | +30.8 |
| Labour hold | | Swing | UKIP to Conservative 9.4 | |
