= 2015 Elmbridge Borough Council election =

2015 UK local government election

Results of the 2015 Elmbridge Borough Council election

The by-thirds 2015 Elmbridge Borough Council election took place on 7 May 2015 to elect members of Elmbridge Borough Council in England. This was on the same day as other local elections.

== Wards ==
The electoral wards drawn under a typical 12-year national review have two or three councillors. The Weybridge North and South, Hinchley Wood, Cobham Fairmile, Walton Ambleside and Weston Green wards form a two-member, lower population minority of six, four of which hold elections in two years in a row followed by two hiatus years, two of which hold elections in alternate years. In 2015 of the 22 wards, 20 had one of their councillors up for election, Weybridge South and Fairmile holding elections in even-numbered years.

== Results ==
Elmbridge Borough Council Election, 2015
Party	Seats	Gains	Losses	Net gain/loss	Seats %	Votes %	Votes	+/−
Conservative	33	2	1	+1	55			
Residents	17	0	2	-2	28			
Liberal Democrats	7	1	0	+1	12			
UKIP	0	0	0	0	0			
Labour	0	0	0	0	0			
Green	0	0	0	0	0			

Local Conservatives unseated two of the residents association representatives: for St Georges Hill and Molesey East wards of the United Kingdom. The Liberal Democrats took a Conservative seat in Claygate ward. The three winners join other fellow incumbents of their party in these wards reflecting in each case a lower percentage swing to their parties in these wards than seen in the election round of the year before. The other seats were won by incumbents or replacement councillors of the same party where the incumbent retired. The political breakdown gave a majority of 9 councillors for the Conservative party, a net rise of one, having gained two, lost one.

The nominal percentage change shown in the results below compares the performance of most of the same candidates as against a new round of incumbent councillors (the performance on party basis in the election of the previous year) as most of the unsuccessful candidates in 2014 stood again here (as in other councils) however this time against the new third of the councillors up for re-election so personal popularity of councillors may provide an additional factor for swings seen. Similarly, the Borough Council compared the turnout to the previous year without a high turnout general election being the 2014 local government and European Parliament elections.

Claygate
Party	Candidate	Votes	%	±%
Liberal Democrats	Kim Cross	1990	48	−3
Conservative	Geoff Herbert	1837	44	+6
UKIP	Bernard Collignon	326	8	−2
Majority		153	4	−9
Turnout			76	+30
Liberal Democrats gain from Conservative		Swing	-4.5	

Cobham and Downside
Party	Candidate	Votes	%	±%
Conservative	Mike Bennison	2237	77	+17
Liberal Democrats	David Bellchamber	522	18	−10
UKIP	Elaine Kingston	401	21	−7
Labour	Irene Threlkeld	284	10	0
Majority		1715	50	+11
Turnout			70	+34
Conservative hold		Swing	+13.5	

Esher
Party	Candidate	Votes	%	±%
Conservative	David Archer	1838	52	+1
Esher Residents' Association	Peter Heaney	1363	38	−11
Green	Laura Harmour	180	5	N/A
Labour	Pam Day	161	5	N/A
Majority		473	13	+11
Turnout			70	+33
Conservative hold		Swing	+1	

Hersham North
Party	Candidate	Votes	%	±%
Conservative	Ian Donaldson	1597	52	+2
Labour	Irene Hamilton	540	18	−7
UKIP	Samantha Fry	417	14	−8
Liberal Democrats	Simon Lumb	274	9	N/A
Green	Dan Fleming	245	8	N/A
Majority		1057	34	+9
Turnout			65	+31
Conservative hold		Swing	+2	

Hersham South
Party	Candidate	Votes	%	±%
Conservative	John Sheldon	2305	64	−4
Labour	Mark Gower	386	11	−8
UKIP	Simon Gordon	386	11	N/A
Green	Olivia Palmer	255	7	N/A
Liberal Democrats	Andrew Sturgis	259	7	−6
Majority		1919	53	+3
Turnout			72	+24
Conservative hold		Swing	-4	

Hinchley Wood
Party	Candidate	Votes	%	±%
Hinchley Wood Residents' Association	Janet Turner	2208	88	+16
Conservative	Xingang Wang	632	12	−7
Majority		1910	76	+12
Turnout			73	+32
Residents hold		Swing	+12.5	

Long Ditton
Party	Candidate	Votes	%	±%
Liberal Democrats	Barry Fairbank	1635	46	−6
Conservative	Hugh Evans	1586	45	+17
UKIP	Susannah Cunningham	313	9	−3
Majority		49	1	−23
Turnout			75	+29
Liberal Democrats hold		Swing	-11.5	

Molesey East
Party	Candidate	Votes	%	±%
Conservative	Peter Szanto	1644	44	−1
Molesey Residents' Association	(defeated Cllr.) Elizabeth Cooper	1396	38	−2
Labour	Mark Doran	275	7	+1
Liberal Democrats	Ann Beauchamp	244	7	+4
UKIP	Trevor Marshall	153	4	−2
Majority		248	7	+1
Turnout			74	+31
Conservative gain from Molesey Residents' Association		Swing	-1 (to others)	

Molesey North
Party	Candidate	Votes	%	±%
Molesey Residents' Association	Ivan Regan	1105	58	0
Conservative	Paul Liptrot	613	19	0
UKIP	Paul Wheatley	329	10	−3
Labour	Ray Kelly	292	9	+3
Liberal Democrats	Alastair Sturgis	138	4	0
Majority		1312	40	+1
Turnout			68	+27
Residents hold		Swing	0	

Molesey South
Party	Candidate	Votes	%	±%
Molesey Residents' Association	Mike Axton	1724	53	−13
Conservative	Graham West	618	19	−1
Labour	Jamal Ajjane	396	12	−3
UKIP	Anita Wooldridge	388	12	N/A
Liberal Democrats	Paul Nagle	148	5	N/A
Majority		808	46	
Turnout			62	+27
Residents hold		Swing	-13	

Oatlands Park
Party	Candidate	Votes	%	±%
Conservative	Barry Cheyne	2165	61	−13
Independent	Neil Hitchins	367	10	N/A
Liberal Democrats	John Smith	325	9	−3
Labour	Martin Lister	293	8	−5
UKIP	Simon Kadwill	266	7	N/A
Green	Nicholas Davis	148	4	N/A
Majority		1798	50	−11
Turnout			72	+35
Conservative hold		Swing	-13	

Oxshott & Stoke D'Abernon
Party	Candidate	Votes	%	±%
Conservative	Elise Dunweber	2588	75	+7
Liberal Democrats	Michael Smith	329	10	−3
UKIP	Philip Birch	321	9	N/A
Labour	Elsie Juma	208	6	−13
Majority		2259	66	+16
Turnout			73	+36
Conservative hold		Swing	+5	

St George's Hill
Party	Candidate	Votes	%	±%
Conservative	Manwinder Toor	1418	47	−0.4
St George's Hill Independents	Peter Harman	1392	46	+0.6
Labour	Thomas Wicks	223	7	−0.2
Majority		26	1	−1
Turnout			66	+29
Conservative gain from St George's Hill Independents		Swing	-0.5	

Thames Ditton
Party	Candidate	Votes	%	±%
Thames Ditton and Weston Green Residents' Association	Joanna Randolph	1985	56	−13
Conservative	Innes Jones	775	22	+7
Labour	Francis Eldergill	302	8	−1
Green	Finula Farruggia	171	5	N/A
UKIP	Redvers Cunningham	170	5	−2
Liberal Democrats	Jaska Alanko	155	4	N/A
Majority		1210	34	−19
Turnout			75	+33
Residents hold		Swing	-13	

Walton Ambleside
Party	Candidate	Votes	%	±%
Conservative	Alan Kopitko	1142	56	0
Labour	Peter Hawkes	427	21	−1
UKIP	Nicholas Wood	298	15	−7
Liberal Democrats	Roy Moffett	163	8	N/A
Majority		715	35	+1
Turnout			63	+29
Conservative hold		Swing	0	

Walton Central
Party	Candidate	Votes	%	±%
The Walton Society	Chris Sadler	1749	49	+3
Conservative	Malcolm Howard	1563	43	+7
UKIP	Gary Carp	291	8	−3
Majority		186	5	−5
Turnout			68	+29
The Walton Society hold		Swing	+3	

Walton North
Party	Candidate	Votes	%	±%
Conservative	Chris Cross	1452	48	−2
UKIP	David Irons	730	24	+2
Labour	Peter Jepsom	554	18	−7
Liberal Democrats	Diane Alanko	279	9	N/A
Majority		337	22	
Turnout			31	
Conservative hold		Swing	-2	

Walton South
Party	Candidate	Votes	%	±%
Conservative	Chris Elmer	1916	54	N/K
The Walton Society	Mike Collins	1054	29	N/K
Liberal Democrats	David Weatherley	329	9	N/K
UKIP	Robert Mikhelson	276	8	N/K
Majority		862	24	+2
Turnout			70%	38%
Conservative hold		Swing		

Weston Green
Party	Candidate	Votes	%	±%
Thames Ditton and Weston Green Residents' Association	Tannia Shipley	1478	66	−3
Conservative	Martin Fox	643	29	+14
UKIP	Richard Atkins	107	5	2
Majority		835	37	−18
Turnout			77.5	+35.6
Residents hold		Swing		

Weybridge North
Party	Candidate	Votes	%	±%
Conservative	Ramon Gray	1190	55	N/K
Liberal Democrats	Vicki MacLeod	628	29	N/K
Labour	Elinor Jones	362	17	N/K
Majority		562	26	N/K
Turnout		66	+34	
Conservative hold		Swing	-3	
