= 2015 Mid Devon District Council election =

Local election in England

Results of the 2015 Mid Devon District Council election

The 2015 Mid Devon District Council election took place on 7 May 2015 to elect members of Mid Devon District Council in England. This was on the same day as other local elections plus the general election for the House of Commons of the United Kingdom.
