= 2015 North Kesteven District Council election =

English council election

Results of the 2015 North Kesteven District Council election

The 2015 North Kesteven District Council election took place on 7 May 2015 to elect members of the North Kesteven District Council in England. It was held on the same day as other local elections.
