= 2015 Surrey Heath Borough Council election =

2015 UK local government election

Results of the 2015 Surrey Heath Borough Council election

The 2015 Surrey Heath Borough Council election took place on 7 May 2015 to elect all members of Surrey Heath Borough Council in England as one of the 2015 local elections, held simultaneously with the General Election.

== Results ==
The results saw these net changes:

Surrey Heath Borough Council Election, 2015
Party	Seats	Gains	Losses	Net gain/loss	Seats %	Votes %	Votes	+/−
Conservative	36	2	1	+1	90	70	62669	
Chobham Independent	2	0	0	0	5	2	2092	
Liberal Democrats	1	1	1	0	2	14	12199	
Labour	1	0	1	-1	2	9	7631	
UKIP	0	0	0	0	0	3	2533	
Green	0	0	0	0	0	2	1787	
Independent	0	0	0	0	0	3	2295	
Christian	0	0	0	0	0	0.2	145	

== Ward by ward ==
Bagshot (3 seats)
Party	Candidate	Votes	%	±%
Conservative	Valerie White	1,897		
Conservative	Katia Malcaus-Cooper	1,302		
Liberal Democrats	Ruth Hutchinson	1,061		
Conservative	Jarmila Yu	983		
Green	Andrew Willgoss	685		
Green	Nick Lyle	511		
Majority		78		
Turnout				
Conservative hold		Swing		
Conservative hold		Swing		
Liberal Democrats gain from Conservative		Swing		

Bisley (2 seats)
Party	Candidate	Votes	%	±%
Conservative	David Mansfield	1,204		
Conservative	Wynne Price	951		
Independent	Mick Raynor	679		
Majority		272		
Turnout				
Conservative hold		Swing		
Conservative hold		Swing		

Chobham (2 seats)
Party	Candidate	Votes	%	±%
Independent	Pat Tedder	1,085		
Independent	Victoria Wheeler	1,007		
Conservative	Carol Gregorious	966		
Conservative	Christopher Rowbotham	819		
Majority		41		
Turnout				
Chobham Independent hold		Swing		
Chobham Independent hold		Swing		

Frimley (3 seats)
Party	Candidate	Votes	%	±%
Conservative	David Allen	1,899		
Conservative	Bruce Mansell	1,679		
Conservative	Ian Sams	1,601		
Labour	Robert McKee	834		
Labour	Alan Barnard	773		
Majority		767		
Turnout				
Conservative hold		Swing		
Conservative hold		Swing		
Conservative hold		Swing		

Frimley Green (3 seats)
Party	Candidate	Votes	%	±%
Conservative	Chris Pitt	1,503		
Conservative	Oliver Lewis	1,323		
Conservative	Max Nelson	1,264		
Liberal Democrats	Duncan Clark	948		
Liberal Democrats	Catherine Whitcroft	864		
Liberal Democrats	Cindy Ferguson	729		
UKIP	Paul Chapman	727		
UKIP	Eddie Hill	529		
Christian	Juliana Brimicombe	145		
Majority		316		
Turnout				
Conservative hold		Swing		
Conservative hold		Swing		
Conservative hold		Swing		

Heatherside (3 seats)
Party	Candidate	Votes	%	±%
Conservative	Paul Ilnicki	2,256		
Conservative	Ian Cullen	1,870		
Conservative	Jonathan Lytle	1,580		
Liberal Democrats	Graham Tapper	1475		
Majority		105		
Turnout				
Conservative hold		Swing		
Conservative hold		Swing		
Conservative hold		Swing		

Lightwater (3 seats)
Party	Candidate	Votes	%	±%
Conservative	Rebecca Jennings-Evans	2,160		
Conservative	Surinder Gandhum	2,038		
Conservative	John Winterton	1,906		
Liberal Democrats	Rob Beere	948		
Liberal Democrats	Robert Hardless	607		
Green	Sharon Galliford	591		
Labour	Mick Sheehan	529		
Majority		958		
Turnout				
Conservative hold		Swing		
Conservative hold		Swing		
Conservative hold		Swing		

Mychett & Deepcut (3 seats)
Party	Candidate	Votes	%	±%
Conservative	Paul Deach	1,871		
Conservative	Jo Potter	1,403		
Conservative	Craig Fennell	1,378		
Liberal Democrats	John Emuss	1065		
Liberal Democrats	David Whitcroft	934		
Liberal Democrats	Adam Stokes	921		
Independent	Jacques Olmo	668		
Majority		313		
Turnout				
Conservative hold		Swing		
Conservative hold		Swing		
Conservative gain from Liberal Democrats		Swing		

Old Dean (2 seats)
Party	Candidate	Votes	%	±%
Labour	Rodney Bates	771		
Conservative	Nick Chambers	724		
Labour	Heather Gerred	704		
Conservative	Abu Baker	611		
Majority		20		
Turnout				
Labour hold		Swing		
Conservative gain from Labour		Swing		

Parkside (3 seats)
Party	Candidate	Votes	%	±%
Conservative	Edward Hawkins	2,280		
Conservative	Josephine Hawkins	2,175		
Conservative	Darryl Ratiram	1,831		
Liberal Democrats	Fran Bennie	1031		
UKIP	Hazel Prowse	870		
Majority		800		
Turnout				
Conservative hold		Swing		
Conservative hold		Swing		
Conservative hold		Swing		

St Michael's (2 seats)
Party	Candidate	Votes	%	±%
Conservative	Colin Dougan	1,308		
Conservative	Alan McClafferty	1,108		
Labour	Richard Claridge	773		
Labour	Murrary Rowlands	665		
Majority		335		
Turnout				
Conservative hold		Swing		
Conservative hold		Swing		

St Paul's (3 seats)
Party	Candidate	Votes	%	±%
Conservative	Dan Adams	2,480		
Conservative	Bill Chapman	2,440		
Conservative	Vivienne Chapman	2,432		
Labour	Mike Philippson	562		
Majority		1870		
Turnout				
Conservative hold		Swing		
Conservative hold		Swing		
Conservative hold		Swing		

Town (2 seats)
Party	Candidate	Votes	%	±%
Conservative	Richard Brooks	1,367		
Conservative	Robin Perry	1,163		
UKIP	Phyllis Harman	407		
Liberal Democrats	Martin Smith	394		
Labour	Linda Philippson	363		
Labour	Paul Tonks	234		
Majority		756		
Turnout				
Conservative hold		Swing		
Conservative hold		Swing		

Watchetts (2 seats)
Party	Candidate	Votes	%	±%
Conservative	David Lewis	1,623		
Conservative	Charlotte Morley	1,515		
Labour	Brian Gibbs	676		
Labour	Jefferson Nwokeoma	442		
Majority				
Turnout		839		
Conservative hold		Swing		
Conservative hold		Swing		

West End (2 seats)
Party	Candidate	Votes	%	±%
Conservative	Adrian Page	1,365		
Conservative	Nic Price	1,002		
Independent	Graham Alleway	948		
Liberal Democrats	Judy Douch	614		
Majority		54		
Turnout				
Conservative hold		Swing		
Conservative hold		Swing		

Windlesham (2 seats)
Party	Candidate	Votes	%	±%
Conservative	Moira Gibson	1,700		
Conservative	Conrad Sturt	1,692		
Liberal Democrats	Margaret Williams	338		
Labour	Richard Wilson	305		
Liberal Democrats	Helen Whitcroft	270		
Majority		1,354		
Turnout				
Conservative hold		Swing		
Conservative hold		Swing		
