= 2015 Coventry City Council election =

2015 UK local government election

Map of the results

The 2015 Coventry City Council election took place on 7 May 2015 to elect members of Coventry City Council in England. This was on the same day as other local elections.
