= 2015 Tewkesbury Borough Council election =

2015 UK local government election

Results of the 2015 Tewkesbury Borough Council election

The 2015 Tewkesbury Borough Council election took place on 7 May 2015 to elect members of the Tewkesbury Borough Council in England. It was held on the same day as other local elections.

== Election result ==
2015 Tewkesbury Borough Council election
Party	Seats	Gains	Losses	Net gain/loss	Seats %	Votes %	Votes	+/−
Conservative	33	9	0	▲9	86.8	48.3	20,261	+2.5
Liberal Democrats	3	0	8	▼8	7.9	23.8	9,972	-6.0
Labour	0	0	0	Steady	0.0	11.1	4,657	-1.0
UKIP	0	0	0	Steady	0.0	8.1	3,417	N/A
TTI	2	0	0	Steady	5.3	3.3	1,380	-1.0
Independent	0	0	0	▼1	0.0	3.1	1,319	-4.9
Green	0	0	0	Steady	0.0	2.2	923	N/A
TUSC	0	0	0	Steady	0.0	0.1	36	N/A

== Ward results ==
=== Ashchurch with Walton Cardiff ===
Ashchurch with Walton Cardiff Ward (2 Councillors)
Party	Candidate	Votes	%	±%
Conservative	Barry Hesketh*	1,035	45.6	−5.0
Conservative	Heather McLain	880	38.8	−7.5
Liberal Democrats	Guy Fancourt	438	19.3	−14.5
Labour	Caroline Baikie	434	19.1	−7.8
UKIP	John Dockree	346	15.3	N/A
UKIP	Adam Tugwell	300	13.2	N/A
Labour	Rosemary Phillips	238	10.5	N/A
Majority		442	19.5	
Turnout		2,268	68.32	
Conservative hold		Swing		
Conservative hold		Swing		

=== Badgeworth ===
Badgeworth Ward (1 Councillor)
Party	Candidate	Votes	%	±%
Conservative	Robert Vines*	938	60.5	−15.1
Liberal Democrats	Clare Softley	612	39.5	+15.1
Majority		326	21.0	
Turnout		1,550	70.77	
Conservative hold		Swing		

=== Brockworth ===
Brockworth Ward (3 Councillors)
Party	Candidate	Votes	%	±%
Conservative	Ronald Furolo	1,769	46.6	+9.3
Conservative	Ruth Hatton	1,711	45.0	+9.6
Conservative	Harry Turbyfield*	1,679	44.2	+14.9
Labour	Ed Buxton	1,199	31.6	−3.8
Labour	Keir Dhillon	819	21.6	N/A
Green	Robert Rendell	730	19.2	N/A
Liberal Democrats	Deborah Midwinter	724	19.1	−37.1
Labour	John Kettle	688	18.1	N/A
Majority		480	12.6	
Turnout		3,800	64.56	
Conservative gain from Liberal Democrats		Swing		
Conservative gain from Liberal Democrats		Swing		
Conservative gain from Liberal Democrats		Swing		

=== Churchdown Brookfield ===
Churchdown Brookfield Ward (2 Councillors)
Party	Candidate	Votes	%	±%
Conservative	David Foyle	979	37.5	+12.6
Conservative	Dick Bishop	846	32.4	+2.4
Liberal Democrats	Richard Smith	691	26.5	−5.4
Independent	Brian Jones*	679	26.0	−11.9
Liberal Democrats	Anthony Stokes	376	14.4	−18.0
Labour	David Carter	328	12.6	−3.5
Labour	Sarah Dhillon	322	12.3	+0.2
Independent	Julie Evans	319	12.2	−12.7
Majority		155	5.9	
Turnout		2,611	76.07	
Conservative gain from Independent		Swing		
Conservative gain from Liberal Democrats		Swing		

=== Churchdown St John's ===
Churchdown St John's Ward (3 Councillors)
Party	Candidate	Votes	%	±%
Liberal Democrats	Kay Berry*	1,562	42.4	−7.5
Liberal Democrats	Pearl Stokes*	1,483	40.3	−10.2
Conservative	Alexander Evans	1,390	37.7	+9.4
Liberal Democrats	Audrey Ricks*	1,385	37.6	−9.8
Conservative	Roger Fox	1,073	29.1	+1.3
Conservative	Jacob Double	1,038	28.2	+0.4
Labour	Kelvin Tustin	697	18.9	+2.5
Majority		5	0.1	
Turnout		3,684	68.80	
Liberal Democrats hold		Swing		
Liberal Democrats hold		Swing		
Conservative gain from Liberal Democrats		Swing		

=== Cleeve Grange ===
Cleeve Grange Ward (1 Councillor)
Party	Candidate	Votes	%	±%
Liberal Democrats	Susan Hillier-Richardson*	542	50.9	−6.8
Conservative	Janet Lord	523	49.1	+17.0
Majority		19	1.8	
Turnout		1,065	68.98	
Liberal Democrats hold		Swing		

=== Cleeve Hill ===
Cleeve Hill Ward (2 Councillors)
Party	Candidate	Votes	%	±%
Conservative	Mike Dean*	Unopposed	N/A	±0.0
Conservative	Anna Hollaway	Unopposed	N/A	±0.0
Majority		N/A	N/A	
Turnout		N/A	N/A	
Conservative hold		Swing		
Conservative hold		Swing		

=== Cleeve St Michael's ===
Cleeve St Michael's Ward (2 Councillors)
Party	Candidate	Votes	%	±%
Conservative	Robert East*	1,257	49.5	+4.7
Conservative	Andrew Reece	1,127	44.4	+15.5
Liberal Democrats	James Habgood	578	22.8	−21.9
Liberal Democrats	Caitriona Clucas	462	18.2	−25.7
Labour	Anthony Bolding	409	16.1	+3.8
Labour	John Hurley	282	11.1	+2.7
Independent	John Peake	236	9.3	N/A
Majority		549	21.6	
Turnout		2,537	66.04	
Conservative hold		Swing		
Conservative gain from Liberal Democrats		Swing		

=== Cleeve West ===
Cleeve West Ward (2 Councillors)
Party	Candidate	Votes	%	±%
Conservative	Robert Bird*	1,240	49.2	+5.0
Conservative	Robert Garnham	1,077	42.7	+2.9
Liberal Democrats	Tony MacKinnon*	955	37.9	−5.9
Liberal Democrats	Peter Richmond	880	34.9	−6.4
Majority		122	4.8	
Turnout		2,521	66.04	
Conservative hold		Swing		
Conservative gain from Liberal Democrats		Swing		

=== Coombe Hill ===
Coombe Hill Ward (2 Councillors)
Party	Candidate	Votes	%	±%
Conservative	David Waters*	1,508	57.8	+57.8
Conservative	Mark Williams*	1,458	55.8	+55.8
Liberal Democrats	Patricia Austin	899	34.4	N/A
Majority		559	21.4	
Turnout		2,611	69.84	
Conservative hold		Swing		
Conservative hold		Swing		

=== Highnam with Haw Bridge ===
Highnam with Haw Bridge Ward (2 Councillors)
Party	Candidate	Votes	%	±%
Conservative	Philip Awford*	1,936	70.8	+5.2
Conservative	Derek Davies*	1,631	59.6	−2.7
Labour	Cherry Burrow	741	27.1	+2.4
Majority		890	32.5	
Turnout		2,736	80.23	
Conservative hold		Swing		
Conservative hold		Swing		

=== Hucclecote ===
Hucclecote Ward (1 Councillor)
Party	Candidate	Votes	%	±%
Conservative	Gillian Blackwell**	726	60.8	+4.6
Liberal Democrats	Charles Stewart	469	39.2	−4.6
Majority		257	21.6	
Turnout		1,195	69.31	
Conservative hold		Swing		

Gillian Blackwell was a sitting councillor for Churchdown Brookfield ward.

=== Innsworth with Down Hatherley ===
Innsworth with Down Hatherley Ward (1 Councillor)
Party	Candidate	Votes	%	±%
Conservative	Graham Bocking	456	39.2	+5.8
Liberal Democrats	William Whelan*	425	37.0	−10.6
UKIP	Paul Ockelton	232	20.2	+1.2
TUSC	Andrew Causon	36	3.1	N/A
Majority		31	2.2	
Turnout		1,149	59.89	
Conservative gain from Liberal Democrats		Swing		

=== Isbourne ===
Isbourne Ward (1 Councillor)
Party	Candidate	Votes	%	±%
Conservative	John Evetts*	Unopposed	N/A	−70.8
Majority		N/A	N/A	
Turnout		N/A	N/A	
Conservative hold		Swing		

=== Northway ===
Northway Ward (2 Councillors)
Party	Candidate	Votes	%	±%
Conservative	Elaine MacTiernan*	874	40.5	−0.7
Conservative	Pauline Godwin	859	39.8	+0.4
UKIP	Stephen Cooper	707	32.8	N/A
Liberal Democrats	Nicholas Curd	504	23.4	N/A
UKIP	Graham Dawson	484	22.4	N/A
Majority		152	7.0	
Turnout		2,158	56.77	
Conservative hold		Swing		
Conservative hold		Swing		

=== Oxenton Hill ===
Oxenton Hill Ward (1 Councillor)
Party	Candidate	Votes	%	±%
Conservative	Mel Gore	Unopposed	N/A	±0.0
Majority		N/A	N/A	
Turnout		N/A	N/A	
Conservative hold		Swing		

=== Shurdington ===
Shurdington (1 Councillor)
Party	Candidate	Votes	%	±%
Conservative	Philip Surman*	744	68.6	−0.4
Liberal Democrats	Jack Williams	341	31.4	N/A
Majority		403	37.2	
Turnout		1,085	72.41	
Conservative hold		Swing		

=== Tewkesbury Newtown ===
Tewkesbury Newtown Ward (1 Councillor)
Party	Candidate	Votes	%	±%
Conservative	Vernon Smith*	860	73.3	+73.3
UKIP	Stuart Adair	313	26.7	N/A
Majority		547	46.6	
Turnout		1,173	75.99	
Conservative hold		Swing		

=== Tewkesbury Prior's Park ===
Tewkesbury Prior's Park Ward (2 Councillors)
Party	Candidate	Votes	%	±%
Conservative	Kevin Cromwell	662	39.3	−22.9
Conservative	Julie Greening	614	36.5	−21.2
No Description	Helen Burns	404	24.0	N/A
UKIP	Joanne Wilkinson	385	22.9	N/A
Liberal Democrats	Stephen Woodrow	360	21.4	+2.0
Independent	Richard Mills	331	19.7	N/A
Independent	Andrew Smith	259	15.4	N/A
Majority		210	12.5	
Turnout		1,683	57.10	
Conservative hold		Swing		
Conservative hold		Swing		

=== Tewkesbury Town with Mitton ===
Tewkesbury Town with Mitton Ward (2 Councillors)
Party	Candidate	Votes	%	±%
Tewkesbury Independents	Michael Sztymiak*	1,380	54.1	-5.5
Tewkesbury Independents	Philip Workman*	1,239	48.6	+1.4
Conservative	Karen Brennan	650	25.5	−8.7
Conservative	Adele-Louise Carter	579	22.7	−4.6
UKIP	Kenneth Powell	481	18.9	−6.1
Majority		589	23.1	
Turnout		2,549	67.48	
Tewkesbury Independents hold		Swing		
Tewkesbury Independents hold		Swing		

=== Twyning ===
Twyning Ward (1 Councillor)
Party	Candidate	Votes	%	±%
Conservative	Terence Spencer	548	48.5	+48.5
UKIP	Gordon Shurmer*	388	34.4	+34.4
Green	Robert Brookes	193	17.1	N/A
Majority		160	14.1	
Turnout		1,129	74.64	
Conservative hold		Swing		

=== Winchcombe ===
Winchcombe Ward (3 Councillors)
Party	Candidate	Votes	%	±%
Conservative	James Mason*	2,166	55.3	−1.7
Conservative	Ronald Allen*	1,975	50.4	−7.2
Conservative	Janet Day*	1,944	49.6	−6.7
Liberal Democrats	Timothy Hall	872	22.3	−4.3
Labour	Susan Sturgeon	849	21.7	+5.3
Labour	David Cook	618	15.8	N/A
Labour	David Hilton	572	14.6	−2.6
UKIP	Christine Dawson	565	14.4	N/A
Majority		1,072	27.3	
Turnout		3,916	73.91	
Conservative hold		Swing		
Conservative hold		Swing		
Conservative hold		Swing		
