= 2015 Teignbridge District Council election =

2015 UK local government election

- 7 May 2015

All 46 seats to Teignbridge District Council 24 seats needed for a majority

	First party	Second party	Third party
Party	Conservative	Liberal Democrats	Independent
Seats won	29	11	6
Seat change	▲4	▼2	▼2
Popular vote	27,914	23,097	14,578
Percentage	32.7%	27.0%	17.1%
- Results of the 2015 Teignbridge District Council election
Council control before election
No overall control
Council control after the election
Conservative

The 2015 Teignbridge District Council election took place on 7 May 2015 to elect members of Teignbridge District Council in England. This was on the same day as other local elections. At the election, the Conservatives won control of the council.

== Summary ==
=== Election results ===
2015 Teignbridge District Council election
Party	Candidates	Seats	Gains	Losses	Net gain/loss	Seats %	Votes %	Votes	+/−
Conservative		29			▲4		32.7		
Liberal Democrats		11			▼2		27.0		
Independent		6			▼2		17.1		
Green		0			Steady				
Labour		0			Steady				
UKIP		0			Steady				
TUSC		0			Steady				
