= 2015 Reigate and Banstead Borough Council election =

2015 UK local government election

Results of the 2015 Reigate and Banstead Borough Council election

The 2015 Reigate and Banstead Borough Council election took place on 7 May 2015 to elect exactly one third of members to Reigate and Banstead Borough Council in England coinciding with other local elections held simultaneously with a General Election which resulted in increased turnout compared to the election four years before. All currently drawn wards of the United Kingdom in this area are three-member and are contested in three years out of four.

== Results ==
Conservatives gained three seats, adding to councillors within the group with overall control of the council.

Reigate and Banstead Borough Council Election, 2015
Party	Seats	Gains	Losses	Net gain/loss	Seats %	Votes %	Votes	+/−
Conservative	40	3	0	+3	80	48	32236	
Residents	6	0	0	0	12	8	5461	
Green	2	0	1	-1	4	8	5439	
Liberal Democrats	1	0	1	-1	2	9	5750	
Independent	1	0	1	-1	2	2	1170	
UKIP	1	0	0	0	2	13	8673	
Labour	0	0	0	0	0	12	8129	

=== Ward by ward ===
Banstead Village
Party	Candidate	Votes	%	±%
Conservative	HACK Lynne Rosemary	1857	51.4	
UKIP	BYRNE Chris John	689	19.1	
Liberal Democrat	FOWLER James Christopher	539	14.9	
Labour	BRADFORD Ann-Marie	527	14.6	
Majority				
Turnout		3612	71	
Conservative hold		Swing		

Chipstead, Hooley and Woodmansterne
Party	Candidate	Votes	%	±%
Conservative	STEPHENSON John Michael	2837		
UKIP	RUSSELL Stephen David Alfred	842		
Labour	LANE Isabella Maria	627		
Liberal Democrat	HOWELL Christopher Ian	418		
Majority				
Turnout			71	
Conservative hold		Swing		

Earlswood and Whitebushes
Party	Candidate	Votes	%	±%
Conservative	THOMSON Barbara Jane	1835		
Labour	WILDRIDGE Graham	852		
UKIP	STIFF Colin Brian	698		
Green	FENTON Sue	631		
Liberal Democrat	KULKA Jane Nicola	471		
Majority				
Turnout			68	
Conservative hold		Swing		

Horley Central
Party	Candidate	Votes	%	±%
Conservative	LYNCH Andrew Mark	1884		
UKIP	BRIGHTING Malcolm Roger	930		
Labour	MABBETT Linda Jane	694		
Green	DODGSON Nicky	346		
Majority				
Turnout			62	
Conservative hold		Swing		

Horley West
Party	Candidate	Votes	%	±%
Conservative	JACKSON David Gareth	1877		
UKIP	BROOKE-HARTE Tim	913		
Labour	SMITH Geoffrey Norman	587		
Liberal Democrat	SOUTHALL Geoffrey Lawrence	284		
Green	ORD David	201		
Majority				
Turnout			70	
Conservative hold		Swing		

Kingswood with Burgh Heath
Party	Candidate	Votes	%	±%
Conservative	MILL Ros	2695		
UKIP	CAMBRIDGE Bob	818		
Green	SMITH Derek	437		
Majority				
Turnout			70	
Conservative hold		Swing		

Meadvale and St. John's
Party	Candidate	Votes	%	±%
Conservative	GODDEN John Steven	1810		
Liberal Democrat	NORMAN Graham Leslie	1509		
Labour	SAVIDGE Malcolm Kemp	442		
Green	VACI Sarah	424		
Majority				
Turnout			73	
Conservative gain from Liberal Democrats		Swing		

Turnout 66.4%

Merstham
Party	Candidate	Votes	%	±%
Conservative	KELLY Frank	1662		
Labour	DACK Stewart James	726		
UKIP	CAMBRIDGE Phyl	662		
Liberal Democrat	DURWARD Deanna Elizabeth	429		
Green	YAU Ken	316		
Majority				
Turnout			66	
Conservative hold		Swing		

Nork
Party	Candidate	Votes	%	±%
Nork Residents` Association	SELBY Michael John	2880		
Conservative	TWEEDALE Pauline Katherine	1485		
Majority				
Turnout			72	
Residents hold		Swing		

Preston
Party	Candidate	Votes	%	±%
Conservative	PAUL Jamie	392		
Independent	HARPER-ADAMSON Gemma	338		
Labour	YOUNG Helen	305		
Majority				
Turnout			53	
Conservative gain from Independent		Swing		

Redhill East
Party	Candidate	Votes	%	±%
Conservative	COAD Richard William	1858		
Green	MCKENNA Stephen	1542		
Labour	SELBY Paul Randall	642		
UKIP	FRENCH Derek Graham	479		
Liberal Democrat	KULKA Rob	331		
Majority				
Turnout			65	
Conservative gain from Green		Swing		

Redhill West
Party	Candidate	Votes	%	±%
Conservative	ELLACOTT Julian Marc	1848		
Labour	JOHNSON Pat	707		
UKIP	PEARSON Tim	534		
Liberal Democrat	CRESSY Andrew James	466		
Green	LANE Kumari	436		
Majority				
Turnout			66	
Conservative hold		Swing		

Reigate Central
Party	Candidate	Votes	%	±%
Conservative	ABSALOM Rosemary Helen	1600		
Independent	WHINNEY Fenella Rosemary	832		
Liberal Democrat	SAMUEL Helen Mary	522		
Labour	SPENCER Robin Paul	416		
Green	ABRAM Soo	330		
UKIP	CLACK Laurence James	273		
Majority				
Turnout			71	
Conservative hold		Swing		

Reigate Hill
Party	Candidate	Votes	%	±%
Conservative	GRANT-DUFF Zully	2335		
Labour	SAUNDERS Andrew David	576		
UKIP	GRANT André Edward	265		
Majority				
Turnout			714	
Conservative hold		Swing		

Salfords and Sidlow
Party	Candidate	Votes	%	±%
Conservative	ROSS-TOMLIN Dorothy Anne	961		
UKIP	BROOKE-HARTE Denese Lee	306		
Labour	O`DWYER Gerry	235		
Majority				
Turnout			71	
Conservative hold		Swing		

South Park and Woodhatch
Party	Candidate	Votes	%	±%
Conservative	ALLCARD Derek	1534		
UKIP	FOX Joseph Brian	699		
Labour	BURTON Paul	564		
Liberal Democrat	CAREY Moray William Macleod	381		
Green	MACHACEK Ian	338		
Majority				
Turnout			65	
Conservative hold		Swing		

Tadworth and Walton
Party	Candidate	Votes	%	±%
Conservative	CLARKE James Allan	2690		
UKIP	MOORE Valerie Ann	565		
Liberal Democrat	BEGLEY-MOORE Sonja	400		
Labour	BURNLEY David Anthony	229		
Green	MORTEN Alistair	205		
Majority				
Turnout			74	
Conservative hold		Swing		

Tattenhams
Party	Candidate	Votes	%	±%
Tattenhams Residents` Association	HARRISON Nick	2581		
Conservative	ILLINGWORTH Jane	1076		
Green	PONSFORD Roger	233		
Majority				
Turnout			68	
Residents hold		Swing		
