= 2015 Sedgemoor District Council election =

2015 UK local government election

Map of the results of the 2015 Sedgemoor District Council election.

The 2015 Sedgemoor District Council election took place on Thursday 7 May 2015 as a four-yearly election to elect all members (councillors) of Sedgemoor District Council in the English county of Somerset. The principal town in the district is Bridgwater accounting for 15 of the 48 councillors elected. The election was part of the 2015 United Kingdom local elections which were held simultaneously with the 2015 General Election.

== Composition of council seats before election ==
After the 2011 District Council election, 31 councillors were Conservatives, 13 were Labour, 2 were Liberal Democrats and there were 2 independents.

Party	Seats
Conservative	31
Labour	13
Liberal Democrats	2
Independent	2

== Election results ==
Sedgemoor local election result 2015
Party	Seats	Gains	Losses	Net gain/loss	Seats %	Votes %	Votes	+/−
Conservative	35	5	1	+4	72.9	53.6	57,884	+1.1%
Labour	10	0	3	-3	20.8	16.0	17,289	-5.0%
UKIP	2	2	0	+2	4.2	6.0	6,486	+16.4%
Liberal Democrats	1	1	-2	-1	2.1	17.1	18,449	-14.8%
Green	0	0	0	0	0	5.7	6,121	+4.6%
Independent	0	0	2	-2	0	1.7	1,835	-2.4%
Total	48						92,692	

== Candidates and ward results ==
Sedgemoor District Council continued to be made up of 48 councillors elected in 23 different wards, each electing between one and three councillors.

32 incumbent councillors stood again in the wards they represented before this election (denoted by a *).

=== Axevale Ward (2 seats) ===
Sedgemoor District Council Elections 2015: Axevale Ward
Party	Candidate	Votes	%	±%
Conservative	Liz Scott*	1,325	29.4	
Conservative	John Henry Denbee*	1,236	27.4	
Liberal Democrats	Jean Margaret Bevis	1,021	22.7	
Green	Jake Flood	562	12.5	
Labour	Tom Scott	361	8.0	
Turnout		4,505		
Conservative hold		Swing		
Conservative hold		Swing		

=== Berrow Ward (1 seat) ===
Sedgemoor District Council Elections 2015: Berrow Ward
Party	Candidate	Votes	%	±%
Conservative	Tony Grimes*	799	64.3	
Liberal Democrats	Andrew William Nisbet	443	35.7	
Turnout		1,242		
Conservative hold		Swing		

=== Bridgwater Dunwear Ward (2 seats) ===
Sedgemoor District Council Elections 2015: Bridgwater Dunwear Ward
Party	Candidate	Votes	%	±%
Labour	Leigh Paul Redman*	748	25.3	
UKIP	Richard Scammell	554	18.8	
Conservative	Pele James Barnes	541	18.3	
Labour	Diogo Rodrigues	438	14.8	
Conservative	Christine Louise McGinty	377	12.8	
Liberal Democrats	Lorna Ann Phillippa King	295	10.0	
Turnout		2,953		
Labour hold		Swing		
UKIP gain from Labour		Swing		

=== Bridgwater Eastover Ward (2 seats) ===
Sedgemoor District Council Elections 2015: Bridgwater Eastover Ward
Party	Candidate	Votes	%	±%
Labour	Dave Loveridge*	708	27.1	
Labour	Moira Brown	648	24.8	
Conservative	Linda Bareham-Stanley	514	19.6	
Conservative	Michael David Hall	506	19.3	
Liberal Democrats	Camael King	240	9.2	
Turnout		2,616		
Labour hold		Swing		
Labour hold		Swing		

=== Bridgwater Fairfax Ward (3 seats) ===
Sedgemoor District Council Elections 2015: Bridgwater Fairfax Ward
Party	Candidate	Votes	%	±%
Labour	Graham John Granter*	1,135	18.3	
Labour	Alex Glassford*	1,081	17.4	
Conservative	Mike Cresswell	986	15.9	
Conservative	Wayne John Pearce	844	13.6	
Labour	Reginald Charles Winslow	844	13.6	
Conservative	Jim Donoghue	765	12.3	
Liberal Democrats	Janice Joanna Somers Beasely	545	8.8	
Turnout		6,200		
Labour hold		Swing		
Labour hold		Swing		
Conservative gain from Labour		Swing		

=== Bridgwater Hamp Ward (2 seats) ===
Sedgemoor District Council Elections 2015: Bridgwater Hamp Ward
Party	Candidate	Votes	%	±%
Labour	Wesley John Hinckes	956	28.8	
Labour	Adrian John Moore*	946	28.5	
Conservative	James Cockram	719	21.6	
Conservative	Andrew Ivor Danniells	703	21.1	
Turnout		3,324		
Labour hold		Swing		
Labour hold		Swing		

=== Bridgwater Victoria Ward (2 seats) ===
Sedgemoor District Council Elections 2015: Bridgwater Victoria Ward
Party	Candidate	Votes	%	±%
Conservative	Lance John Duddridge	812	23.3	
Labour	Mick Lerry*	763	21.9	
Conservative	Barrie Clive Crow	654	18.8	
Labour	Siobhan Wilson	636	18.2	
UKIP	Roderick Silvester Sidney Lukins	621	17.8	
Turnout		3,486		
Labour hold		Swing		
Conservative gain from Labour		Swing		

=== Bridgwater Westover Ward (2 seats) ===
Sedgemoor District Council Elections 2015: Bridgwater Westover Ward
Party	Candidate	Votes	%	±%
Labour	Kathy Pearce*	954	26.5	
Labour	Brian David Smedley*	878	24.3	
Conservative	Jeffrey Searle	767	21.3	
Conservative	John Douglas Watts	634	17.6	
Liberal Democrats	Barbara Fisher	373	10.3	
Turnout		3,606		
Labour hold		Swing		
Labour hold		Swing		

=== Bridgwater Wyndham Ward (2 seats) ===
Sedgemoor District Council Elections 2015: Bridgwater Wyndham Ward
Party	Candidate	Votes	%	±%
Conservative	Gill Slocombe*	1,322	31.3	
Conservative	Rachael Helen Caswell	1,293	30.6	
Labour	Liz Leavy	620	14.7	
Labour	Caroline Ann Wilkins	516	12.2	
Liberal Democrats	Peter Ian Johnstone	476	11.3	
Turnout		4,227		
Conservative hold		Swing		
Conservative hold		Swing		

=== Burnham Central Ward (3 seats) ===
Sedgemoor District Council Elections 2015: Burnham Central Ward
Party	Candidate	Votes	%	±%
Conservative	Michael Clarke*	1,372	16.5	
Conservative	Maria Clarke	1,367	16.4	
Conservative	Mike Facey	1,239	14.9	
Liberal Democrats	Phil Harvey	1,076	12.9	
Liberal Democrats	Katie Georgina Lawson	1,029	12.4	
Liberal Democrats	Sarah Milner Simonds	909	10.9	
UKIP	James Donnellan	883	10.6	
Green	Eve Harriet Courtney	445	5.3	
Turnout		8,320		
Conservative hold		Swing		
Conservative hold		Swing		
Conservative gain from Liberal Democrats		Swing		

=== Burnham North Ward (3 seats) ===
Sedgemoor District Council Elections 2015: Burnham North Ward
Party	Candidate	Votes	%	±%
Conservative	Peter Laurence Burridge-Clayton*	1,883	21.7	
Conservative	Cheryl Lesley Burnett	1,620	18.6	
Conservative	Paul Herbert	1,256	14.5	
Liberal Democrats	Beverly Milner Simonds	1,029	11.8	
Liberal Democrats	Tom Nichols	861	9.9	
UKIP	Helen Hims	823	9.5	
Liberal Democrats	Victoria Weavell	798	9.2	
Green	Alexander Begg Lawrie	422	4.9	
Turnout		8,692		
Conservative hold		Swing		
Conservative hold		Swing		
Conservative hold		Swing		

=== Cannington & Wembdon Ward (2 seats) ===
Sedgemoor District Council Elections 2015: Cannington & Wembdon Ward
Party	Candidate	Votes	%	±%
Conservative	Ian Dyer*	1,588	36.1	
Conservative	Ann Bown*	1,455	33.1	
Liberal Democrats	Alan James Beasley	809	18.4	
Green	Allan Jeffrey	546	12.4	
Turnout		4,398		
Conservative hold		Swing		
Conservative hold		Swing		

=== Cheddar & Shipham Ward (3 seats) ===
Sedgemoor District Council Elections 2015: Cheddar & Shipham Ward
Party	Candidate	Votes	%	±%
Conservative	Dawn Hill*	1,889	19.3	
Conservative	Peter John Shilton Downling*	1,765	18.0	
Conservative	Jeff Savage*	1,720	17.6	
Liberal Democrats	Suzanne Mary Green	1,523	15.6	
Liberal Democrats	John Outhwait	1,303	13.3	
Labour	Norma Scanlon	809	8.3	
UKIP	Will Hims	783	8.0	
Turnout		9,792		
Conservative hold		Swing		
Conservative hold		Swing		
Conservative hold		Swing		

=== East Poldens Ward (1 seat) ===
Sedgemoor District Council Elections 2015: East Poldens Ward
Party	Candidate	Votes	%	±%
Conservative	Duncan McGinty*	814	66.6	
Green	Ian Richard Horsfield	408	33.4	
Turnout		1,222		
Conservative hold		Swing		

=== Highbridge & Burnham Marine Ward (3 seats) ===
Sedgemoor District Council Elections 2015: Highbridge & Burnham Marine Ward
Party	Candidate	Votes	%	±%
Conservative	Janet Anita Keen	937	11.3	
UKIP	Lorna Corke	907	10.9	
Conservative	Roger Charles Keen	876	10.5	
Liberal Democrats	Fiona Joan Hector	640	7.7	
Liberal Democrats	John David Parkes	599	7.2	
Conservative	James Roughton	564	6.8	
Labour	Forrester Shiela Rachel	550	6.6	
Liberal Democrats	Graham Alan Kennedy	549	6.6	
Independent	Chris Williams*	536	6.4	
Labour	Alan Beech	499	6.0	
Independent	Mike Mansfield*	493	5.9	
Independent	Bill Hancock	436	5.2	
Independent	Tony Lynham	370	4.4	
Labour	Lucy Emily Scanton	366	4.4	
Turnout		8,322		
Conservative gain from Liberal Democrats		Swing		
Conservative gain from Independent		Swing		
UKIP gain from Independent		Swing		

=== Huntspill & Pawlett Ward (1 seat) ===
Sedgemoor District Council Elections 2015: Huntspill & Pawlett Ward
Party	Candidate	Votes	%	±%
Conservative	John Charles Woodman	793	61.2	
Liberal Democrats	Susanna Louise Peel Craig	286	22.1	
Green	Terry Peers	217	16.7	
Turnout		1,296		
Conservative hold		Swing		
Conservative hold		Swing		

=== Kings Isle Ward (2 seats) ===
Sedgemoor District Council Elections 2015: Kings Isle Ward
Party	Candidate	Votes	%	±%
Conservative	Liz Perry	1,592	33.7	
Conservative	Derek Stanley Alder*	1,520	32.1	
Liberal Democrats	Mike Senior	827	17.5	
Green	Josephine Sally Smoldon	792	16.7	
Turnout		4,731		
Conservative hold		Swing		
Conservative hold		Swing		

=== Knoll Ward (2 seats) ===
Sedgemoor District Council Elections 2015: Knoll Ward
Party	Candidate	Votes	%	±%
Conservative	Bob Filmer*	1,888	38.6	
Conservative	Andrew Gilling*	1,433	29.3	
Liberal Democrats	Tony Gore	922	18.9	
UKIP	Isobel Fotheringham	647	13.2	
Turnout		4,890		
Conservative hold		Swing		
Conservative hold		Swing		

=== North Petherton (3 seats) ===
Sedgemoor District Council Elections 2015: North Petherton
Party	Candidate	Votes	%	±%
Conservative	Alan Sydney Earnest Bradford*	2,316	22.6	
Conservative	Anne Elisabeth Fraser*	2,078	20.3	
Liberal Democrats	Revans Bill	1,891	18.4	
Conservative	Lucy Miranda Allen	1,874	18.3	
Labour	Marion Denham	1,155	11.3	
Green	Jen Bayford	941	9.2	
Turnout		10,255		
Conservative hold		Swing		
Conservative hold		Swing		
Liberal Democrats gain from Conservative		Swing		

=== Puriton & Woolavington Ward (2 seats) ===
Sedgemoor District Council Elections 2015: Puriton & Woolavington Ward
Party	Candidate	Votes	%	±%
Conservative	Mark Healey*	1,204	29.0	
Conservative	Alison Jane Hamlin*	1,052	25.3	
UKIP	Pete Hollings	877	21.1	
Labour	Richard Cecil Hampson	542	13.1	
Green	Valerie Bannister	477	11.5	
Turnout		4,152		
Conservative hold		Swing		
Conservative hold		Swing		

=== Quantocks Ward (2 seats) ===
Sedgemoor District Council Elections 2015: Quantocks Ward
Party	Candidate	Votes	%	±%
Conservative	Julie Annette Pay*	1,605	35.7	
Conservative	Michael Graham Caswell*	1,458	32.5	
Green	Lindy Booth	766	17.1	
Labour	Philip S T Lawrence King	662	14.7	
Turnout		4,491		
Conservative hold		Swing		
Conservative hold		Swing		

=== Wedmore & Mark Ward (2 seats) ===
Sedgemoor District Council Elections 2015: Wedmore & Mark Ward
Party	Candidate	Votes	%	±%
Conservative	Polly Costello	1,686	34.7	
Conservative	Will Human	1,280	26.3	
Liberal Democrats	Rosemary Joan Hasler	1,034	21.3	
Labour	Gabrielle Kathleen Hector	474	9.7	
UKIP	Dave Wills	391	8.0	
Turnout		4,865		
Conservative hold		Swing		
Conservative hold		Swing		

=== West Poldens Ward (1 seat) ===
Sedgemoor District Council Elections 2015: West Poldens Ward
Party	Candidate	Votes	%	±%
Conservative	Stuart Arthur Kingham*	963	63.9	
Green	Charles Graham	545	36.1	
Turnout		1,508		
Conservative hold		Swing		
