= 2015 Rugby Borough Council election =

Local election in England

Map of the results

The 2015 Rugby Borough Council election took place on 7 May 2015 to elect members of Rugby Borough Council in England. It was held on the same day as other local elections.
