= 2015 Tandridge District Council election =

2015 UK local government election

Results of the 2015 Tandridge District Council election

The 2015 Tandridge District Council election took place on 7 May 2015 to elect one third of members to Tandridge District Council in England coinciding with other local elections held simultaneously with a General Election which resulted in increased turnout compared to the election four years before. Elections in each ward, depending on size are held in two or three years out of four.

== Results ==
Conservatives gained two seats, adding to councillors within the group with overall control of the Council.

Tandridge District Council Election, 2015
Party	Seats	Gains	Losses	Net gain/loss	Seats %	Votes %	Votes	+/−
Conservative	35	2	0	+2	83	55	18408	
Liberal Democrats	6	0	1	-1	12	15	5118	
Independent	1	0	1	-1	2	2	776	
Labour	0	0	0	0	0	11	3814	
UKIP	0	0	0	0	0	16	5300	
Green	0	0	0	0	0	0.3	117	

== Ward results ==
An asterisk * indicates an incumbent seeking re-election.

Bletchingley and Nutfield
Party	Candidate	Votes	%	±%
Conservative	Gill Black*	1,834		
UKIP	Ian Crabb	508		
Liberal Democrats	Richard Fowler	421		
Labour	Linda Baharier	350		
Majority				
Turnout				
Conservative hold		Swing		

Burstow, Horne and Outwood
Party	Candidate	Votes	%	±%
Conservative	Guy Wates	1,734		
UKIP	Mark Fowler	647		
Labour	Stephen Case-Green	404		
Liberal Democrats	Judy Wilkinson	250		
Majority				
Turnout				
Conservative hold		Swing		

Chaldon
Party	Candidate	Votes	%	±%
Conservative	Pat Cannon*	787		
Liberal Democrats	Mary Tomlin	168		
UKIP	Alan Lavender	150		
Majority				
Turnout				
Conservative hold		Swing		

Dormansland and Felcourt
Party	Candidate	Votes	%	±%
Conservative	Lesley Steeds*	1,396		
UKIP	Julia Searle	306		
Liberal Democrats	Tony Hardisty	226		
Labour	Alexander Marshall	126		
Green	Ann Seuret	117		
Majority				
Turnout				
Conservative hold		Swing		

Felbridge
Party	Candidate	Votes	%	±%
Conservative	Ken Harwood*	1,151		
Labour	Benjamin Marshall	145		
Majority				
Turnout				
Conservative hold		Swing		

Godstone
Party	Candidate	Votes	%	±%
Conservative	Nick Childs*	1,578		
UKIP	Richard Grant	801		
Liberal Democrats	Colin White	376		
Labour	Sarah MacDonnell	314		
Majority				
Turnout				
Conservative hold		Swing		

Limpsfield
Party	Candidate	Votes	%	±%
Conservative	Lindsey Dunbar*	1,560		
Liberal Democrats	Sheelagh Crampton	271		
UKIP	Joe Branco	238		
Labour	Terence Philpot	156		
Majority				
Turnout				
Conservative hold		Swing		

Lingfield and Crowhurst
Party	Candidate	Votes	%	±%
Conservative	Liz Lockwood	1,233		
UKIP	David Milne	435		
Liberal Democrats	David Wilkes	403		
Labour	Anita Ainsworth	248		
Majority				
Turnout				
Conservative gain from Independent		Swing		

Oxted North and Tandridge
Party	Candidate	Votes	%	±%
Conservative	Martin Fisher*	1,915		
Liberal Democrats	Stuart Paterson	536		
UKIP	Chris Dean	444		
Labour	Cyrus Gilbert-Rolfe	372		
Majority				
Turnout				
Conservative hold		Swing		

Oxted South
Party	Candidate	Votes	%	±%
Conservative	Simon Ainsworth*	1,637		
Labour	Barbara Harling	877		
UKIP	Graham Bailey	446		
Liberal Democrats	Robert Wingate	347		
Majority				
Turnout				
Conservative hold		Swing		

Portley
Party	Candidate	Votes	%	±%
Conservative	Clive Manley	1,142		
Liberal Democrats	Christopher Botten*	645		
UKIP	Alexander Standen	318		
Labour	Peter McNeil	216		
Majority				
Turnout				
Conservative gain from Liberal Democrats		Swing		

Tatsfield and Titsey
Party	Candidate	Votes	%	±%
Independent	Martin Allen	776		
Conservative	Tony Roberts	339		
Labour	Christina Vogt	59		
Majority				
Turnout				
Independent hold		Swing		

Valley
Party	Candidate	Votes	%	±%
Liberal Democrats	Jill Caudle*	725		
Conservative	Liz Goodwin	701		
UKIP	Jeffrey Bolter	358		
Labour	John Burgess	289		
Majority				
Turnout				
Liberal Democrats hold		Swing		

Warlingham East, Chelsham and Farleigh
Party	Candidate	Votes	%	±%
Conservative	Cindy Steer	1,401		
Liberal Democrats	Anna Patel	750		
UKIP	Martin Haley	649		
Labour	John Watts	258		
Majority				
Turnout				
Conservative hold		Swing		
