= 2015 Wolverhampton City Council election =

2015 UK local government election

The 2015 Wolverhampton City Council election took place on 7 May 2015, to elect members of the Wolverhampton City Council in England. It was held on the same day as other local elections.
