= 2015 Eden District Council election =

2015 UK local government election

Results by ward

The 2015 Eden District Council election took place on 7 May 2015 to elect members of Eden District Council in England. This was on the same day as other local elections.

== Results by electoral ward ==
=== Alston Moor ===
Alston Moor (2 seats)
Party	Candidate	Votes	%	±%
Independent	Patricia Mary Goodwin	710	64.1	
Conservative	David Hymers	487	44.0	
Independent	Timothy Alan Haldon	446	40.3	
Turnout		1,120	62.8	+16.8
Independent hold		Swing		
Conservative hold		Swing		

=== Appleby (Appleby) ===
Appleby (Appleby) (1 seat)
Party	Candidate	Votes	%	±%
Independent	Alan Keith Morgan	Unopposed	n/a	n/a
Turnout		n/a		
Independent hold		Swing		

=== Appleby (Bongate) ===
Appleby (Bongate) (1 seat)
Party	Candidate	Votes	%	±%
Liberal Democrats	Andrew Nicholas Connell	Unopposed	n/a	n/a
Turnout		n/a		
Liberal Democrats hold		Swing		

=== Askham ===
Askham (1 seat)
Party	Candidate	Votes	%	±%
Conservative	Michael Donald Randall Slee	432	56.2	−4.0
Liberal Democrats	Darrell Jon Smith	337	43.8	+4.0
Turnout		787	69.4	+26.4
Conservative hold		Swing		

=== Brough ===
Brough (1 seat)
Party	Candidate	Votes	%	±%
Independent	John Malcolm Smith	392	55.5	n/a
Independent	Ian Roger Tench	314	44.5	n/a
Turnout		730	66.0	n/a
Independent hold		Swing		

=== Crosby Ravensworth ===
Crosby Ravensworth (1 seat)
Party	Candidate	Votes	%	±%
Conservative	Joan Elizabeth Raine	Unopposed	n/a	n/a
Turnout		n/a		
Conservative hold		Swing		

=== Dacre ===
Dacre (1 seat)
Party	Candidate	Votes	%	±%
Liberal Democrats	Judith Margaret Derbyshire	503	56.1	n/a
Independent	Hugh Harrison	393	43.9	n/a
Turnout		920	76.1	n/a
Liberal Democrats gain from Independent		Swing		

=== Eamont ===
Eamont (1 seat)
Party	Candidate	Votes	%	±%
Conservative	Ian Edmund Chambers	Unopposed	n/a	n/a
Turnout		n/a		
Conservative gain from Independent		Swing		

=== Greystoke ===
Greystoke (1 seat)
Party	Candidate	Votes	%	±%
Conservative	Richard Harper Sealby	Unopposed	n/a	n/a
Turnout		n/a		
Conservative hold		Swing		

=== Hartside ===
Hartside (1 seat)
Party	Candidate	Votes	%	±%
Conservative	Sheila Orchard	438	56.7	n/a
Independent	Susan Jane Castle-Clarke	334	43.3	n/a
Turnout		812	75.1	n/a
Conservative hold		Swing		

=== Hesket ===
Hesket (2 seats)
Party	Candidate	Votes	%	±%
Conservative	Elaine Mary Martin	1,094	64.0	
Conservative	Lesley Ann Grisedale	825	48.3	
Independent	Debra Ann Wicks	502	29.4	
Turnout		1,765	68.11	
Conservative hold		Swing		
Conservative hold		Swing		

=== Kirkby Stephen ===
Kirkby Stephen (2 seats)
Party	Candidate	Votes	%	±%
Independent	Trevor Charles Ladhams	Unopposed	n/a	n/a
Conservative	Valerie Kendall	Unopposed	n/a	n/a
Turnout		n/a		
Independent hold		Swing		
Conservative gain from Independent		Swing		

=== Kirkby Thore ===
Kirkby Thore (1 seat)
Party	Candidate	Votes	%	±%
Independent	John Sawrey Cookson	Unopposed	n/a	n/a
Turnout		n/a		
Independent hold		Swing		

=== Kirkoswald ===
Kirkoswald (1 seat)
Party	Candidate	Votes	%	±%
Independent	Mary Robinson	Unopposed	n/a	n/a
Turnout		n/a		
Independent hold		Swing		

=== Langwathby ===
Langwathby (1 seat)
Party	Candidate	Votes	%	±%
Independent	Douglas Hugh Banks	494	55.9	n/a
Conservative	Thomas William Wentworth Waites	239	27.0	n/a
Independent	Alan William Marsden	151	17.1	n/a
Turnout		916	70.6	
Independent hold		Swing		

=== Lazonby ===
Lazonby (1 seat)
Party	Candidate	Votes	%	±%
Conservative	Gordon Macpherson Nicolson	Unopposed	n/a	n/a
Turnout		n/a		
Conservative hold		Swing		

=== Long Marton ===
Long Marton (1 seat)
Party	Candidate	Votes	%	±%
Conservative	Maurice Allan Armstrong	Unopposed	n/a	n/a
Turnout		n/a		
Conservative gain from Liberal Democrats		Swing		

=== Morland ===
Morland (1 seat)
Party	Candidate	Votes	%	±%
Independent	Michael Christopher Tonkin	Unopposed	n/a	n/a
Turnout		n/a		
Independent hold		Swing		

=== Orton with Tebay ===
Orton with Tebay (1 seat)
Party	Candidate	Votes	%	±%
Conservative	Adrian John Todd	Unopposed	n/a	n/a
Turnout		n/a		
Conservative hold		Swing		

=== Penrith Carleton ===
Penrith Carleton (1 seat)
Party	Candidate	Votes	%	±%
Conservative	Paula Breen	525	66.5	n/a
Liberal Democrats	John Grattan Bowen	264	33.5	n/a
Turnout		909	67.8	
Conservative gain from Liberal Democrats		Swing		

=== Penrith East ===
Penrith East (2 seats)
Party	Candidate	Votes	%	±%
Liberal Democrats	Michael Denis Eyles	Unopposed	n/a	n/a
Conservative	John Charles Lynch	Unopposed	n/a	n/a
Turnout		n/a		
Liberal Democrats hold		Swing		
Conservative hold		Swing		

=== Penrith North ===
Penrith North (3 seats)
Party	Candidate	Votes	%	±%
Liberal Democrats	Deborah Mary Holden	1,037	49.3	
Liberal Democrats	Robin John Howse	909	43.2	
Conservative	Scott Michael Jackson	773	36.7	
Conservative	Stephen Ridley	746	35.4	
Conservative	David Whipp	746	35.4	
Labour	Geoffrey Rockliffe-King	606	28.8	
Turnout			61.9	
Liberal Democrats hold		Swing		
Liberal Democrats hold		Swing		
Conservative hold		Swing		

=== Penrith Pategill ===
Penrith Pategill (1 seat)
Party	Candidate	Votes	%	±%
Liberal Democrats	John Michael Tompkins	Unopposed	n/a	n/a
Turnout		n/a		
Liberal Democrats gain from Conservative		Swing		

=== Penrith South ===
Penrith South (2 seats)
Party	Candidate	Votes	%	±%
Conservative	Malcolm Temple	615	53.0	n/a
Independent	Margaret Clark	576	49.7	n/a
Liberal Democrats	Roger Burgin	302	26.0	n/a
Turnout			56.7	
Conservative hold		Swing		
Independent hold		Swing		

=== Penrith West ===
Penrith West (2 seats)
Party	Candidate	Votes	%	±%
Liberal Democrats	Virginia Christine Taylor	571	44.9	
Conservative	John George Thompson	545	42.8	
Labour	Jamie Nicholas Ayers	475	37.3	n/a
Turnout		1,591	52.8	
Liberal Democrats hold		Swing		
Conservative hold		Swing		

=== Ravenstonedale ===
Ravenstonedale (1 seat)
Party	Candidate	Votes	%	±%
Conservative	Angela Marie Meadowcroft	Unopposed	n/a	n/a
Turnout		n/a		
Conservative gain from Liberal Democrats		Swing		

=== Shap ===
Shap (1 seat)
Party	Candidate	Votes	%	±%
Conservative	John Mervyn Owen	Unopposed	n/a	n/a
Turnout		n/a		
Conservative gain from Liberal Democrats		Swing		

=== Skelton ===
Skelton (1 seat)
Party	Candidate	Votes	%	±%
Conservative	Kevin Michael Beaty	Unopposed	n/a	n/a
Turnout		n/a		
Conservative hold		Swing		

=== Ullswater ===
Ullswater (1 seat)
Party	Candidate	Votes	%	±%
Conservative	Alistair Richard Hogg	Unopposed	n/a	n/a
Turnout		n/a		
Conservative hold		Swing		

=== Warcop ===
Warcop (1 seat)
Party	Candidate	Votes	%	±%
Independent	William Patterson	Unopposed	n/a	n/a
Turnout		n/a		
Independent hold		Swing		
