= 2015 Purbeck District Council election =

2015 UK local government election

Map of the results of the 2015 Purbeck District Council election. Conservatives in blue, Liberal Democrats in yellow and independents in grey.

The 2015 Purbeck District Council election took place on 7 May 2015 to elect members of Purbeck District Council in England. This was on the same day as other local elections.
