= 2015 North East Lincolnshire Council election =

2015 UK local government election

Results by ward.

The 2015 North East Lincolnshire Council election took place on 7 May 2015 to elect members of North East Lincolnshire Council in England. This was on the same day as other local elections and the general election for the House of Commons of the United Kingdom.

== Council make up ==
After the 2015 local election, the political make up of the council was as follows:

Party	Number of councillors
Labour	20
Conservative	10
Liberal Democrats	3
UKIP	9
Green	0
Independent	0

No seats changed hands between parties at these council elections, with the exception of a by-election for an additional seat in East Marsh which otherwise wouldn't have been contested again until 2016 that UKIP gained from Labour. The same seat would be vacated only months later by the winning candidate, and was left vacant until the next set of local elections in the authority because it occurred less than six months before the 2016 local elections.

In four wards (Humberston and New Waltham, Scartho, South, and West Marsh) elected new councillors as the incumbents did not stand again.

Shortly after these elections, a by-election was held in the Croft Baker ward in July 2015 due to the death of the winning candidate Michael Burnett shortly after these elections. Labour held the seat.

== Ward results ==
=== Croft Baker ===
Croft Baker 2015
Party	Candidate	Votes	%	±%
Labour	Michael Burnett	2056		
Conservative	Hayden Dawkins	1370		
UKIP	Graham John Critchley	1202		
Liberal Democrats	Sarah Elaine Hughes	220		
Green	James William Barker	202		
TUSC	Dave Mitchell	95		
Majority		686		
Labour hold		Swing		

Note: Burnett died shortly after this election. Labour retained the seat in the resultant by-election.

=== East Marsh ===
East Marsh 2015 (2 seats)
Party	Candidate	Votes	%	±%
Labour	Terry Walker	952		
UKIP	Becci Bishell	883		
Labour	Neil Martin Trenchard	867		
Liberal Democrats	Lauren Bruce	834		
Liberal Democrats	Les Windsor	662		
Conservative	Jake Brown	386		
Green	Andy Dickson	211		
TUSC	Phil Tuplin	135		
Majority		16		
Labour hold		Swing		
UKIP gain from Labour		Swing		

Note: A by-election was held for an additional seat in the ward, caused by the resignation of councillor Jon-Paul Howarth, whose seat was last contested in 2012. The results meant that Walker (who last contested his seat in 2011) held his seat and was elected for four years, as he would have done if there was no by-election and assuming he won. Bishell won the by-election seat and won a term of office for only one year. She resigned due to illness only several months later, and the seat was left vacant as it was less than six months until the 2016 local elections.

=== Freshney ===
Freshney 2015
Party	Candidate	Votes	%	±%
Labour	Ray Sutton	1791		
UKIP	John William Chapman	1181		
Conservative	Max Logan Burnett	1133		
Green	Andy Lingwood	136		
TUSC	Ian Michael Radford	37		
Majority		610		
Labour hold		Swing		

=== Haverstoe ===
Haverstoe 2015
Party	Candidate	Votes	%	±%
Conservative	Keith Cyrus Brookes	2783		
UKIP	Terry Robinson	1302		
Labour	Alexander Wallace	1270		
Liberal Democrats	Roy Horobin	369		
TUSC	Julian Darren Best	37		
Majority		1481		
Conservative hold		Swing		

Note: Wallace previously represented Sidney Sussex from 1995 to 2003, before contesting Humberston and New Waltham that year and losing. He later went on to represent his original seat again from 2010 until he lost to UKIP in 2014.

=== Heneage ===
Heneage 2015
Party	Candidate	Votes	%	±%
Labour	Matthew David Patrick	1730		
UKIP	Mark Smith	1335		
Conservative	Mike Rudkin	917		
Liberal Democrats	Stuart Shepherd	289		
TUSC	Val O’Flynn	105		
Majority		395		
Labour hold		Swing		

Note: Rudkin previously represented Scartho from 1999 to 2006. Smith contested this ward in 2012 as an Independent candidate.

=== Humberston & New Waltham ===
Humberston & New Waltham 2015
Party	Candidate	Votes	%	±%
Conservative	Stan Shreeve	2902		
UKIP	David Rimmer Walker	1627		
Labour	Kathryn Helen Wheatley	1360		
TUSC	Samuel Chad Bankes-Archer	93		
Majority		1275		
Conservative hold		Swing		

Note: Wheatley previously represented East Marsh (then known as North-East) from 1999 to 2003.

=== Immingham ===
Immingham 2015
Party	Candidate	Votes	%	±%
Labour	Mike Burton	2121		
Conservative	Debbie Hill	1397		
UKIP	Joy Banks	1344		
Green	Martin Leslie Reed	184		
TUSC	Andrew Jonathan Simon Smith	78		
Majority		724		
Labour hold		Swing		

Notes: Hill previously contested this seat as a Liberal Democrat in 2010.

=== Park ===
Park 2015
Party	Candidate	Votes	%	±%
Liberal Democrats	Andrew De Freitas	1745		
Labour	Ian Keith Townsend	1223		
Conservative	Sarah Rudkin	1144		
UKIP	Jane Whittingham	980		
Green	Jacqueline Vessey	272		
TUSC	Andrew Paul Wood	63		
Majority		522		
Liberal Democrats hold		Swing		

Note: De Freitas received more votes at this local election held solely within his ward than his party's general election candidate got throughout the entire Great Grimsby constituency which took place on the same day, thus suggesting that a large proportion of the people who voted for him to be their councillor actually voted for other candidates than the Liberal Democrats on their general election ballot papers.

=== Scartho ===
Scartho 2015
Party	Candidate	Votes	%	±%
Conservative	Ian Robert Lindley	1962		
Labour	Irene Kelly	1554		
Liberal Democrats	David Michael De Freitas	439		
Majority		342		
Conservative hold		Swing		

Note: This was the first occasion since 2011 in which the Conservatives managed to successfully win (regardless of whether it was a hold or a gain) a ward within the Great Grimsby constituency. Lindley was previously a Labour councillor for West Marsh from 2010 to 2014, but quit the party over not being selected for the seat in which he lived in (Yarborough) and his disagreement with the all-women's shortlist imposed on the Great Grimsby constituency candidate selection for the 2015 general election. He had been nominated for his West Marsh seat, but pulled out on the night before Tim Mickleburgh was chosen as his replacement.

=== South ===
South 2015
Party	Candidate	Votes	%	±%
Labour	Chris Stanland	1681		
UKIP	Paul David Batson	1278		
Conservative	Alastair Carl Grigg	742		
Liberal Democrats	Steve Hocknell	172		
TUSC	Angela Heather Greenfield	83		
Majority		403		
Labour hold		Swing		

Notes: Stanland resigned little over a year after being elected. He previously contested Humberston and New Waltham as a Liberal Democrat in 2011. The resultant by-election saw Labour hold the seat with a small swing towards them. Hocknell previously represented Heneage ward from 2003 to 2011.

=== Sidney Sussex ===
Sidney Sussex 2015
Party	Candidate	Votes	%	±%
Labour	Hazel Florence Jane Chase	1666		
UKIP	Tanya Brasted	1133		
Conservative	Debbie Landymore	985		
Green	Warren Peter Jolly	272		
Liberal Democrats	Steve Stead	129		
TUSC	Malcolm Morland	82		
Majority		533		
Labour hold		Swing		

Notes: Morland was a former Labour councillor for this ward from 1995 to 1999, before changing seats in 1999 to Croft Baker until 2003. He returned to the council when he became a Liberal Democrat councillor for this ward from 2006 to 2010. Stead previously represented Yarborough for his party from 1999 to 2003.

=== Waltham ===
Waltham 2015
Party	Candidate	Votes	%	±%
Conservative	Philip Jackson	2156		
Labour	Ashley David Smith	840		
UKIP	Guy Thomas Twisleton Haxby	760		
Liberal Democrats	Louise Julie Horobin	146		
TUSC	Val Pow	39		
Majority		1316		
Conservative hold		Swing		

=== West Marsh ===
West Marsh 2015
Party	Candidate	Votes	%	±%
Labour	Karl Wilson	939		
UKIP	Stephen Whittingham	560		
Independent	Peter Michael Barker	301		
Conservative	Holly Joanne Amanda Hill	233		
Independent	Keith Watkin	201		
TUSC	David John Hardy	74		
Majority		379		
Labour hold		Swing		

Note: Wilson previously represented Heneage from 2010 to 2014. Watkin and Barker were elected to this ward as Independents in 1999, until losing their seats to Labour in 2010 and 2011 respectively.

=== Wolds ===
Wolds 2015
Party	Candidate	Votes	%	±%
Conservative	Hilda Melanie Dickerson	2105		
Labour	Marian Jervis	953		
UKIP	Anthony Alan Blake	909		
TUSC	Karen Michelle Manley	50		
Majority		1152		
Conservative hold		Swing		

=== Yarborough ===
Yarborough 2015
Party	Candidate	Votes	%	±%
Labour	Peter Christopher Wheatley	1900		
UKIP	Thomas James Furneaux	1391		
Conservative	Martin Peter Johnson	1096		
Liberal Democrats	Carol Beasant	252		
Green	Vicky Dunn	176		
TUSC	Benjamin Leech	47		
Majority		509		
Labour hold		Swing		

Note: Furneaux previously contested Park for the Conservatives in 2014.
