= 2015 Three Rivers District Council election =

2015 UK local government election

2015 local election results in Three Rivers

The 2015 Three Rivers District Council election took place on 7 May 2015 to elect members of the Three Rivers District Council in England. It was held on the same day as other local elections.
