= 2015 Watford Borough Council election =

2015 UK local government election

2015 local election results in Watford

The 2015 Watford Borough Council election took place on 7 May 2015 to elect members of Watford Borough Council in England. This was on the same day as other local elections.

== Ward results ==
=== Callowland ===
Callowland
Party	Candidate	Votes	%	±%
Labour	Favour Ewudo	1,061		
Labour	Seamus Williams	1,014		
Conservative	Joanne Norwood	749		
Liberal Democrats	Robbie Laird	580		
Conservative	Neil Punter	571		
Liberal Democrats	Paddy Kent	540		
Green	Su Murray	477		
UKIP	Jon Goddard	410		
Green	Dorothy Nixon	384		
UKIP	David Penn	274		
Independent	Richard Short	95		
Majority				
Turnout		6155		
Labour hold		Swing		
Labour gain from Green		Swing		

=== Central ===
Central
Party	Candidate	Votes	%	±%
Labour	Michael Haley	1,248	33.46	
Liberal Democrats	Collette Blake	1,036	27.77	
Conservative	Amrish Patel	806	21.60	
UKIP	Renie Price	355	9.52	
Green	Jeni Grewcock	253	6.78	
TUSC	Mark O'Connor	32	0.86	
Majority		212	5.69	
Turnout		3730		
Labour gain from Liberal Democrats		Swing		

=== Holywell ===
Holywell
Party	Candidate	Votes	%	±%
Labour	Nigel Bell	1,974	55.95	
Conservative	Penelope Mortimer	641	18.17	
Liberal Democrats	Simonie Jeffree	407	11.54	
UKIP	Gavin Smith	336	9.52	
Green	Rhiannon Grant	144	4.08	
TUSC	Sajith Attepuram	26	0.74	
Majority		1333	37.78	
Turnout		3528		
Labour hold		Swing		

=== Leggatts ===
Leggatts
Party	Candidate	Votes	%	±%
Labour	Asif Khan	1,297		
Conservative	Steve O'Brian	1,026		
Liberal Democrats	Bobby Amin	648		
UKIP	Phil Cox	470		
Green	Neal Emery	184		
TUSC	Thinshkumar Balasingham	33		
Majority		271		
Turnout		3648		
Labour hold		Swing		

=== Meridan ===
Meridan
Party	Candidate	Votes	%	±%
Conservative	Mark Whitman	1,029		
Labour	Min Rodriguez	908		
Liberal Democrats	Amanda Grimston	906		
UKIP	Nick Lincoln	624		
Green	Clair Lester	120		
TUSC	Derek Foster	18		
Majority		121		
Turnout				
Conservative gain from Liberal Democrats		Swing		

=== Nascot ===
Nascot
Party	Candidate	Votes	%	±%
Conservative	Linda Topping	1,701		
Liberal Democrats	Jeanette Aron	1,568		
Labour	Daniel Kerry	648		
UKIP	Caroline Penn	307		
Green	Sally Ivans	241		
Majority		133		
Turnout		4465		
Conservative gain from Liberal Democrats		Swing		

=== Oxhey ===
Oxhey
Party	Candidate	Votes	%	±%
Liberal Democrats	Shirena Counter	1,945		
Conservative	Dina Bhudia	964		
Labour	Sue Sleeman	581		
Green	Angela Tunstall	249		
TUSC	Sharon Belsham-Wray	50		
Majority		981		
Turnout		3789		
Liberal Democrats hold		Swing		

=== Park ===
Park
Party	Candidate	Votes	%	±%
Liberal Democrats	Anne Rindl	1,677		
Conservative	Rosemarie Sharshini	1,620		
Labour	Manjivan Dhindsa	627		
UKIP	Peter Blogg	309		
Green	Bob Wallace	207		
Majority		57		
Turnout		4440		
Liberal Democrats hold		Swing		

=== Stanborough ===
Stanborough
Party	Candidate	Votes	%	±%
Liberal Democrats	Darek Scudder	1,317		
Conservative	Christopher Hawes	1,008		
Labour	Steven Palmer	669		
Green	Sean Sweeney	429		
UKIP	Andrew Cox	102		
TUSC	John McShane	30		
Majority		309		
Turnout		3555		
Liberal Democrats hold		Swing		

=== Tudor ===
Tudor
Party	Candidate	Votes	%	±%
Conservative	Sean Silver	1,236		
Liberal Democrats	Joe Fahmy	842		
Labour	Diana Ivory	625		
UKIP	Dan Channing	419		
Green	Anne Simpson	161		
Majority		394		
Turnout		3283		
Conservative gain from Liberal Democrats		Swing		

=== Vicarage ===
Vicarage
Party	Candidate	Votes	%	±%
Labour	Nasreen Shah	1,827		
Conservative	Amanda Norwood	657		
Liberal Democrats	Agnieszka Dychton	522		
UKIP	Pat Shippey	259		
Green	Alistair Noble	237		
TUSC	Clive Jones	42		
Majority		1170		
Turnout		3544		
Labour hold		Swing		

=== Woodside ===
Woodside
Party	Candidate	Votes	%	±%
Conservative	Tony Rogers	1,125		
Liberal Democrats	Glen Saffrey	853		
Labour	Omar Ismail	659		
UKIP	Ian Green	592		
Green	Alison Wiesner	119		
Majority		272		
Turnout		3348		
Conservative gain from Liberal Democrats		Swing		
