= 2015 Slough Borough Council election =

2015 UK local government election

Results of the 2015 Slough Borough Council election

The by-thirds 2015 Slough Borough Council election took place on 7 May 2015 to elect approximately one third of the members of Slough Borough Council in England to coincide with other local elections, an election which was held simultaneously with the 2015 General Election, resulting in higher turnout than the previous election.

== Results summary ==
The Labour Party won 10 of the 14 seats contested, losing one to the Conservative Party who held two and made a second gain, which was at the expense of the only UKIP incumbent councillor whose seat was up for election, leaving UKIP with one councillor.

In parties without seats, Liberal Democrats secured fourth place in the four wards in which they stood, thus no seats, and the other two candidates shown in the table below won less than 6% of the vote in their multi-choice respective wards, Cippenham Green and Langley St Mary's, to finish fourth and fifth respectively, obtaining the fewest votes in those wards.

Slough Borough Council Election, 2015
Party	Seats	Gains	Losses	Net gain/loss	Seats %	Votes %	Votes	+/−
Labour	32	0	1	-1	76%	48%	24,687	
Conservative	9	2	0	2	21%	34%	17,544	
UKIP	1	0	1	-1	2%	15%	7,883	
Liberal Democrats	0	0	0	0	0%	2%	1,088	
Independent	0	0	0	0	0%	0%	109	
English Democrat	0	0	0	0	0%	0%	39	

== Ward results ==
Baylis & Stoke
Party	Candidate	Votes	%	±%
Labour	Mohamed Nazir	2,503	70.5%	
Conservative	Mushtaq Ahmed	736	20.7%	
UKIP	Nadir Malik	310	8.7%	
Majority		767	49.8%	
Turnout		3,549	51%	
Labour hold		Swing		

Britwell and Northborough
Party	Candidate	Votes	%	±%
Labour	Pavitar Mann	1,695	50.5%	
UKIP	Steven Gillingwater	953	28.4%	
Conservative	Gurcharan Singh	708	21.1%	
Majority		742	22.1%	
Turnout		3,356	49%	
Labour hold		Swing		

Central
Party	Candidate	Votes	%	±%
Labour	Sabia Hussain	1,741	49.9%	
Conservative	Mohammed Aziz	1,319	37.8%	
UKIP	Malcolm Mason	285	8.2%	
Liberal Democrats	Khaalid Malik	141	4.0%	
Majority		422	12.1%	
Turnout		3,486	47%	
Labour hold		Swing		

Chalvey
Party	Candidate	Votes	%	±%
Labour	Khaula Usmani	1,875	57.1%	
Conservative	Basharat Khan	1,068	32.5%	
UKIP	Dale Bridges	343	10.4%	
Majority		807	24.6%	
Turnout		3286	42%	
Labour hold		Swing		

Cippenham Green
Party	Candidate	Votes	%	±%
Labour	James Swindlehurst	1,826	43.3%	
Conservative	Gurcharan Manku	1,416	33.6%	
UKIP	Helen Banfield	864	20.5%	
Independent	Ken Wright	109	2.6%	
Majority		410	9.7%	
Turnout		4,215	58%	
Labour hold		Swing		

Cippenham Meadows
Party	Candidate	Votes	%	±%
Labour	Nataša Pantelić	1,898	44.9%	
Conservative	Jassy Rakhra	1,336	31.6%	
UKIP	Lea Trainer	654	15.5%	
Liberal Democrats	Robert Plimmer	340	8.0%	
Majority		562	13.3%	
Turnout		4,228	53%	
Labour hold		Swing		

Colnbrook with Poyle
Party	Candidate	Votes	%	±%
Conservative	Dexter Smith	964	43.4%	
Labour	Eddy Elum-Smith	779	35.1%	
UKIP	Keith Franklin	476	21.5%	
Majority		185	8.3%	
Turnout		2,219	49%	
Conservative hold		Swing		

Elliman
Party	Candidate	Votes	%	±%
Labour	Sohail Munawar	1,957	61.3%	
Conservative	Neelam Iqbal	902	28.3%	
UKIP	Tariq Malik	333	10.4%	
Majority		1,055	33.0%	
Turnout		3,192	53%	
Labour hold		Swing		

Farnham
Party	Candidate	Votes	%	±%
Labour	Ishrat Shah	2,013	55.6%	
Conservative	Meeta Dhaliwal	1,145	31.6%	
UKIP	Kathy Wood	465	12.8%	
Majority		868	24.0%	
Turnout		3,623	49%	
Labour hold		Swing		

Haymill & Lynch Hill
Party	Candidate	Votes	%	±%
Conservative	Darren Morris	1,691	42.4%	
Labour	Jemma Davis	1,395	35.0%	
UKIP	Andy Mellor	903	22.6%	
Majority		296	7.4%	
Turnout		3,989	49%	
Conservative gain from UKIP		Swing		

Langley Kedermister
Party	Candidate	Votes	%	±%
Labour	Mandeep Rana	1,666	42.7%	
Conservative	Bharat Mittal	1,339	34.4%	
UKIP	Mohammad Malik	576	14.8%	
Liberal Democrats	Josephine Hanney	317	8.1%	
Majority		327	8.3%	
Turnout		3,898	53%	
Labour hold		Swing		

Langley St Mary's
Party	Candidate	Votes	%	±%
Conservative	Amarpreet Dhaliwal	1,728	40.2%	
Labour	Shabnum Sadiq	1,413	32.9%	
UKIP	Neil Hodgson	830	19.3%	
Liberal Democrats	Gary Griffin	290	6.7%	
English Democrat	John Barrow	39	0.9%	
Majority		315	7.3%	
Turnout		4,300	58%	
Conservative gain from Labour		Swing		

Upton
Party	Candidate	Votes	%	±%
Conservative	Rayman Bains	2,210	54.1%	
Labour	Hardeep Sahota	1,547	37.9%	
UKIP	Asif Jamshaid	326	8.0%	
Majority		663	16.2%	
Turnout		4,083	62%	
Conservative hold		Swing		

Wexham Lea
Party	Candidate	Votes	%	±%
Labour	Paul Sohal	2,270	59.5%	
Conservative	Ruffat Ali Noor	982	25.7%	
UKIP	Sherine Lake	565	14.8%	
Majority		1,288	33.8%	
Turnout		3,817	53%	
Labour hold		Swing		
