= 2015 Walsall Metropolitan Borough Council election =

2015 local election in England

Map of the results

The 2015 Walsall Metropolitan Borough Council election took place on 7 May 2015 to elect members of Walsall Metropolitan Borough Council in England. This was on the same day as other local elections.

== Council make up ==
After the 2015 local election, the political make up of the council was as follows:

Party	Number of councillors
Labour	27
Conservative	25
Liberal Democrats	2
UKIP	3
Independent	3
