= 2015 Newcastle-under-Lyme Borough Council election =

2015 UK local government election

Results of the 2015 Newcastle-under-Lyme Borough Council election

The 2015 Newcastle-under-Lyme Borough Council election took place on 7 May 2015 to elect members of the Newcastle-under-Lyme Borough Council in England. It was held on the same day as other local elections.

== Election result ==
Newcastle-under-Lyme Borough Council Election, 2015
Party	Seats	Gains	Losses	Net gain/loss	Seats %	Votes %	Votes	+/−
Labour	11	0	3	-3				
Conservative	9	4	0	+4				
Liberal Democrats	0	0	2	-2				
UKIP	0	0	0	0	0			
Independent	0	0	0	0	0			
TUSC	0	0	0	0	0			
	0	0	0	0	0			
TOTAL	20	5	5	0		100%		

Despite the Labour Party winning the most seats at the 2015 election and not gauging an overall majority, a by-election in 2017 saw the Conservative Party gaining the seat from Labour.

This means the Conservative Party gained control of the council from the previous Labour minority administration.
