= 2015 Shepway District Council election =

2015 UK local government election

Map of the results

The 2015 Shepway District Council election took place on 7 May 2015 to elect members of the Shepway District Council in England. It was held on the same day as other local elections.

The Conservative Party won 22 seats and retained control of the council. UKIP won 7 and Labour won 1.
