= 2015 Herefordshire Council election =

2015 UK local government election

Results of the 2015 Herefordshire Council election

The 2015 Herefordshire Council election took place on 7 May 2015 to elect all members of the Herefordshire Council in England. It was held on the same day as other local elections.

2015 Herefordshire Council election
Party	Seats	Gains	Losses	Net gain/loss	Seats %	Votes %	Votes	+/−
Conservative	29					41.3	37,873	
It's Our County	12					26.6	24,324	
Independent	8					28.7	17,108	
Liberal Democrats	2					7.2	6,582	
Green	2					4.4	4,062	
UKIP	0					1.5	1,383	
Labour	0					0.3	278	
