= 2015 Stratford-on-Avon District Council election =

2015 UK local government election

Map of the results

The 2015 Stratford-on-Avon District Council election took place on 7 May 2015 to elect members of the Stratford-on-Avon District Council in England. It was held on the same day as other local elections.

The 2015 election took place on new boundaries, and the electoral cycle was changed from one-third of councillors elected each year, to whole council elections every four years.
