= 2015 Cherwell District Council election =

2015 UK local government election

Results of the 2015 Cherwell District Council election

The 2015 Cherwell District Council election took place on 7 May 2015 to elect members of the Cherwell District Council in England. This was on the same day as other local elections.
