= 2015 Broxbourne Borough Council election =

Council Election in England

The 2015 Broxbourne Borough Council election took place on 7 May 2015 to elect members of the Broxbourne Borough Council in England. This was on the same day as other local elections.
