= 2015 Allerdale Borough Council election =

2015 UK local government election

Map of the results

The 2015 Allerdale Borough Council election took place on 7 May 2015 to elect members of Allerdale Borough Council in England. This was on the same day as other local elections.

== Results ==
Party	Party	Gained	Lost	Seats	+/-
	Labour			28	Steady
	Conservative			17	▲5
	Independent			8	▼8
	UKIP			3	▲3
	Liberal Democrats			0	Steady
	Green			0	Steady

== Results by Ward ==
All Saints (3)
Party	Candidate	Votes	%	±%
Labour	Alan Smith	1,147	19.6	
Labour	Len Davies	1,066	18.2	
Labour	Christine May Smith	891	15.2	
None	Leah Lister	648	11.1	
None	Michael Bradshaw	631	10.8	
None	Jamie Starkie	542	9.3	
UKIP	Eric Atkinson	487	8.3	
Green	Jane C. Roy	442	7.6	

Aspatria (2)
Party	Candidate	Votes	%	±%
Independent	Bill Finlay	620	28.3	
UKIP	David Wilson	534	24.4	
Labour	Brian George Cope	462	21.1	
Labour	Janet Mary King	437	19.9	
Green	Laura Rumney	140	6.4	

Boltons (1)
Party	Candidate	Votes	%	±%
Conservative	Malcolm Grainger	512	47.3	
Independent	Marion Cynthia Fitzgerald	444	41.0	
Green	Dianne Standen	127	11.7	

Broughton St. Bridget's (2)
Party	Candidate	Votes	%	±%
Independent	Nicky Cockburn	911	27.8	
Labour	Janet Isabel Farebrother	828	25.2	
UKIP	Richard Mawdsley	617	18.8	
Labour	Martin Antony Parlett	565	17.2	
Green	Mark Cardwell	359	10.9	

Christchurch (2)
Party	Candidate	Votes	%	±%
Conservative	Eric Nicholson	925	26.7	
Conservative	Margret Jackson	832	24.0	
Labour	Joan Ellis	714	20.6	
Labour	Jim Samson	580	16.8	
Green	Pete Barnes	216	6.2	
Liberal Democrats	Roger Peck	193	5.6	

Clifton (1)
Party	Candidate	Votes	%	±%
Labour	Phil Tibble	541	70.7	
Green	Flic Crowley	224	29.3	

Crummock (1)
Party	Candidate	Votes	%	±%
Conservative	Anthony Howard Annison	636	67.6	
Green	Brad Rotarides	305	32.4	

Dalton (1)
Party	Candidate	Votes	%	±%
Conservative	Colin Sharpe	510	48.2	
Liberal Democrats	Juliet Margret Henderson	226	21.4	
Green	Christina Turtle	168	15.9	
UKIP	Phil Gibson	153	14.5	

Derwent Valley (1)
Party	Candidate	Votes	%	±%
Conservative	Adrian Paul Davis-Johnston	534	63.0	
Green	Steven George Denton	313	37.0	
