= 2015 Forest Heath District Council election =

2015 UK local government election

Map of the results

The 2015 Forest Heath District Council election took place on 7 May 2015 to elect members of the Forest Heath District Council in England. It was held on the same day as other local elections.

== Results summary ==
Forest Heath Borough Council election, 2015
Party	Seats	Gains	Losses	Net gain/loss	Seats %	Votes %	Votes	+/−
Conservative	21			▼2		51.3	21,043	+3.8
West Suffolk Independent	3	3	0	▲3		17.7	7,260	N/A
UKIP	2	2	0	▲2		17.9	7,179	+6.8
Independent	1	0	0	Steady		2.3	929	-8.9
Labour	0	0	2	▼2		10.3	4,113	+6.8
Liberal Democrats	0	0	2	▼2		1.2	479	-13.6
