= 2015 Stafford Borough Council election =

2015 UK local government election

Results by ward

Elections to Stafford Borough Council were held on Thursday 7 May 2015. The number of seats was reduced from 59 to 40 following a boundary review undertaken by the Local Government Boundary Commission. Going into the elections, the Conservatives controlled the Council with 35 members and Labour were the official Opposition with 17 members. There were also 6 independents. All seats on the council were up for election and the election coincided with the 2015 general election.
