= 2015 Chesterfield Borough Council election =

2015 UK local government election

Elections to Chesterfield Borough Council in Derbyshire, England were held on 7 May 2015, at the same time as the 2015 UK General Election. All of the council falls up for election every four years and the Labour group increased their majority on the council.

== Election result ==
After the election, the composition of the council was:

- Labour 38
- Liberal Democrat 9
- UKIP 1

=== Ward by ward ===
Chesterfield local election result 2015
Party	Seats	Gains	Losses	Net gain/loss	Seats %	Votes %	Votes	+/−
Labour	38	3	0	+3	79.2	44.3	20472	
Liberal Democrats	9	0	4	-4	18.8	23.6	12826	
Conservative	0	0	0	0	0	18.1	9817	
UKIP	1	1	0	+1	2.1	8.8	4809	
Independent	0	0	0	0	0	3.9	2103	
TUSC	0	0	0	0	0	1.1	576	
Peace	0	0	0	0	0	0.3	140	

== Ward results ==
Barrow Hill and New Whittington
Party	Candidate	Votes	%	±%
Liberal Democrats	Barry Bingham	975	32.7	
Labour	Lisa-Marie Derbyshire	853	28.6	
UKIP	Richard Bexton	795	26.7	
Labour	Joanne Barnett	708		
Labour	Marion Thorpe	700		
UKIP	Paul Stone	660		
UKIP	Christopher Heels	634		
Liberal Democrats	Jane Collins	517		
Liberal Democrats	Andy Jakins	499		
Conservative	Lewis Preston	266	8.9	
Conservative	Linda Rowley	245		
Conservative	Susan Gibbons	243		
Independent	Phillip Bailey	48	1.6	
TUSC	Matt Whale	43	1.4	
Independent	Shelton Mann	15		
Independent	Sissy McMahon	11		
Majority		69	7.42	−6.65
Turnout				
Liberal Democrats hold		Swing		
Labour gain from Liberal Democrats		Swing		
UKIP gain from Liberal Democrats		Swing		

Brimington North
Party	Candidate	Votes	%	±%
Labour	John Burrows	1166	69.6	
Labour	Terry Gilby	1045		
Conservative		275	16.4	
Liberal Democrats	Harry Holloway	234	14.0	
Liberal Democrats	Jolyon Favreau	208		
Turnout				
Labour hold		Swing		
Labour hold		Swing		

Brimington South
Party	Candidate	Votes	%	±%
Labour	Ian Callan	1763	52.6	
Labour	Tricia Gilby	1699		
Labour	Andy Bellamy	1697		
Conservative	Paul Gibbons	849	25.3	
Liberal Democrats	Joanne Favreau	740	22.1	
Liberal Democrats	Keith Shutler	649		
Turnout				
Labour hold		Swing		
Labour hold		Swing		
Labour hold		Swing		

Brockwell
Party	Candidate	Votes	%	±%
Liberal Democrats	Maureen Davenport	1382	34.6	
Labour	Steve Brunt	1380	34.6	
Labour	John Dickinson	1317		
Liberal Democrats	Ray Russell	1291		
Labour	Jill Mannion-Brunt	1273		
Liberal Democrats	Chris Slack	1047		
UKIP	Stuart Yeowart	664	16.6	
Conservative	Simon Temperton	566	14.2	
Majority				
Turnout				
Liberal Democrats hold		Swing		
Labour gain from Liberal Democrats		Swing		
Labour gain from Liberal Democrats		Swing		

Dunston
Party	Candidate	Votes	%	±%
Labour	Gordon Simmons	1412	46.4	
Labour	Sarah Hollingworth	1404		
Labour	Mark Rayner	1401		
UKIP	Lee Cooper	653	21.5	
UKIP	Alexander Millward	633		
Conservative	Irene Wilkinson	499	16.4	
Liberal Democrats	Sue Christopher	476	15.7	
Liberal Democrats	Patrick Proctor	475		
Turnout				
Labour hold		Swing		
Labour hold		Swing		
Labour hold		Swing		

Hasland
Party	Candidate	Votes	%	±%
Labour	Mick Brady	1649	47.7	
Labour	Amanda Serjeant	1568		
Labour	Andy Slack	1502		
Liberal Democrats	Andrew Hallyer	1114	32.2	
Liberal Democrats	Lorna Hall	859		
Liberal Democrats	Steve Cadywould	839		
Conservative	Anne Sterland	693		
Majority				
Turnout				
Labour hold		Swing		
Labour hold		Swing		
Labour hold		Swing		

Hollingwood and Inkersall
Party	Candidate	Votes	%	±%
Labour	Helen Elliott	1803	46.6	
Labour	Barry Dyke	1685		
Labour	Anthony Hill	1507		
Independent	Mick Bagshaw	971	25.1	
Independent	Paul Mann	875		
Independent	Ruth Perry	792		
Conservative	Andrew Jervis	661	17.1	
Liberal Democrats	Claire Gratton	437	11.3	
Majority				
Turnout				
Labour hold		Swing		
Labour hold		Swing		
Labour hold		Swing		

Holmebrook
Party	Candidate	Votes	%	±%
Labour	Steohen Hitchin	997	51.1	
Labour	Suzie Perkins	973		
Liberal Democrats	Keith Falconer	555	28.5	
Liberal Democrats	Glenys Falconer	515		
Conservative	Annetta Woodhead	258	13.2	
Peace	Tommy Holgate	140	7.2	
Turnout				
Labour hold		Swing		
Labour hold		Swing		

Linacre
Party	Candidate	Votes	%	±%
Liberal Democrats	Jeannie Barr	773	33.8	
Liberal Democrats	Peter Barr	765		
Labour	Andrew Oakley	719	31.4	
Labour	Diane Oakley	670		
UKIP	Ian Jerram	441	19.3	
UKIP	Sharon Buxton	390		
Conservative	Gordon Partington	354	15.5	
Turnout		2095	65.2	+26.65
Liberal Democrats hold		Swing		
Liberal Democrats hold		Swing		

Loundsley Green
Party	Candidate	Votes	%	±%
Labour	Avis Murphy	984	51.1	
Labour	Mick Wall	902		
Liberal Democrats	Christopher Bierne	365	19.0	
Liberal Democrats	Kevin Maher	337		
Independent	Terry McMahon	307	15.9	
Conservative	Richard Woodhead	270	14.0	
Independent	Luigi Postiglione	227		
Majority				
Turnout				
Labour hold		Swing		
Labour hold		Swing		

Lowgates and Woodthorpe
Party	Candidate	Votes	%	±%
Labour	Dean Collins	1143	67.0	
Labour	Lisa Collins	1078		
Conservative	Christopher Austin	378	22.1	
Conservative	Malcolm Rowley	357		
Independent	Joe Mann	186	10.9	
Independent	Michelle Mann	146		
Majority				
Turnout				
Labour hold		Swing		
Labour hold		Swing		

Middlecroft and Poolsbrook
Party	Candidate	Votes	%	±%
Labour	Chris Ludlow	1302	64.9	
Labour	Donald Parsons	1289		
Conservative	Margaret Moss	359	17.9	
Liberal Democrats	Alice Blyth	344	17.2	
Majority				
Turnout				
Labour hold		Swing		
Labour hold		Swing		

Moor
Party	Candidate	Votes	%	±%
Labour	Katie Caulfield	943	49.3	
Labour	Keith Brown	927		
Liberal Democrats	Tony Rogers	669	35.0	
Liberal Democrats	Sonia Allen	551		
Conservative	Lisa Gingell	301	15.7	
Turnout				
Labour hold		Swing		
Labour hold		Swing		

Old Whittington
Party	Candidate	Votes	%	±%
Labour	Jean Innes	880	42.2	
Labour	Peter Innes	833		
UKIP	Joan Bentley	498	23.9	
UKIP	Laura Bentley	550		
Conservative	Norman Andrews	324	15.5	
Liberal Democrats	John Rimington	317	15.2	
TUSC	Sean Vickers	65	3.1	
Majority				
Turnout				
Labour hold		Swing		
Labour hold		Swing		

Rother
Party	Candidate	Votes	%	±%
Labour	Jenny Flood	1496	41.9	
Labour	Stuart Brittain	1433		
Labour	Keith Miles	1374		
UKIP	Carl Walters	735	20.6	
Conservative	Stella Hunt	528	14.8	
Liberal Democrats	Clive Archer	497	13.9	
TUSC	Lisa Pritchard	313	8.8	
Turnout				
Labour hold		Swing		
Labour hold		Swing		
Labour hold		Swing		

St Helen’s
Party	Candidate	Votes	%	±%
Labour	Helen Bagley	1206	57.2	
Labour	Tom Murphy	1148		
UKIP	Keith Lomas	464	22.0	
UKIP	Fran Lomas	398		
Liberal Democrats	Daniel Marshall	223	10.6	
Liberal Democrats	Michelle Stevenson-Briggs	221		
Conservative	Jonathan Wilkinson	215	10.2	
Turnout				
Labour hold		Swing		
Labour hold		Swing		

St Leonard’s
Party	Candidate	Votes	%	±%
Labour	Sharon Blank	2071	44.6	
Labour	Ken Huckle	1832		
Labour	Kate Sarvent	1715		
Conservative	Shelley Dale	1020	21.9	
Liberal Democrats	Maggie Cannon	966	20.8	
Liberal Democrats	Yvette Marsden	665		
Independent	Adrian Mather	591	12.7	
Majority				
Turnout				
Labour hold		Swing		
Labour hold		Swing		
Labour hold		Swing		

Walton
Party	Candidate	Votes	%	±%
Liberal Democrats	Alexis Diouf	1467	40.9	
Liberal Democrats	Vickey Diouf	1318		
Liberal Democrats	Nick Redihough	1165		
Labour	Helen Blair	1131	31.5	
Labour	Graham Barnett	1025		
Labour	Gordon McLaren	1013		
Conservative	Paul Dale	990	27.6	
Conservative	James Hunt	762		
Conservative	Bentley Strafford-Stephenson	739		
Turnout				
Liberal Democrats hold		Swing		
Liberal Democrats hold		Swing		
Liberal Democrats hold		Swing		

West
Party	Candidate	Votes	%	±%
Liberal Democrats	Howard Borrell	1292	30.8	
Labour	Ray Catt	1174	28.0	
Liberal Democrats	Shirley Niblock	1115		
Liberal Democrats	Paul Niblock	1051		
Conservative	John Boult	1011	24.11	
Labour	Sharon Wall	1008		
Labour	Rachel Rush	985		
Conservative	Marcus Linsey	865		
Conservative	Nigel Sterland	836		
UKIP	Rod Harrison	559	13.3	
UKIP	Robert Warwick	469		
TUSC	Paul Packham	155	3.7	
Turnout				
Liberal Democrats hold		Swing		
Labour hold		Swing		
Liberal Democrats hold		Swing		
