= 2011 United Kingdom local elections =

British municipal election

- 5 May 2011

All 36 metropolitan boroughs, 49 out of 55 unitary authorities, 194 out of 201 district councils, all 26 Northern Irish councils, and 5 directly elected mayors

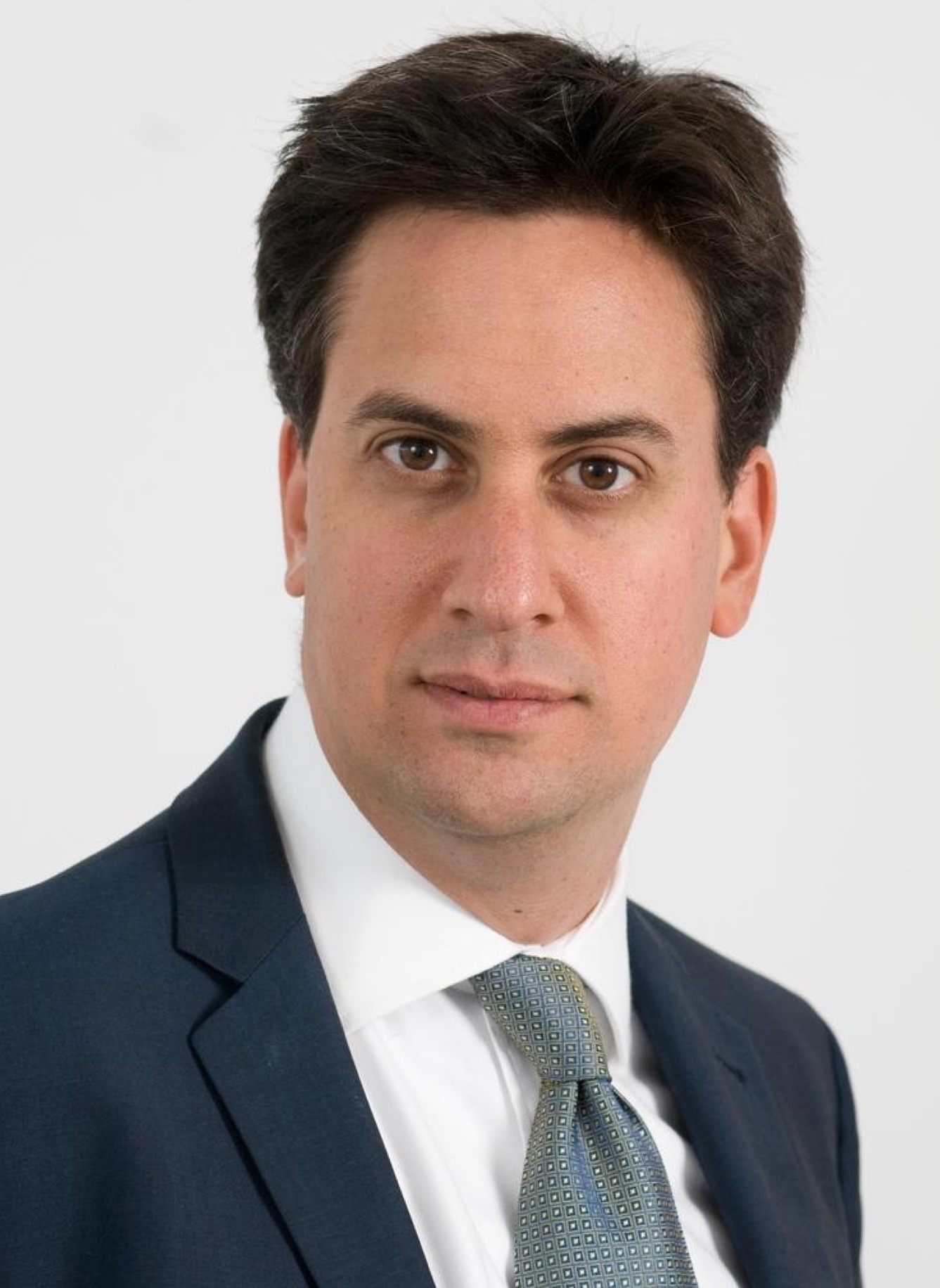

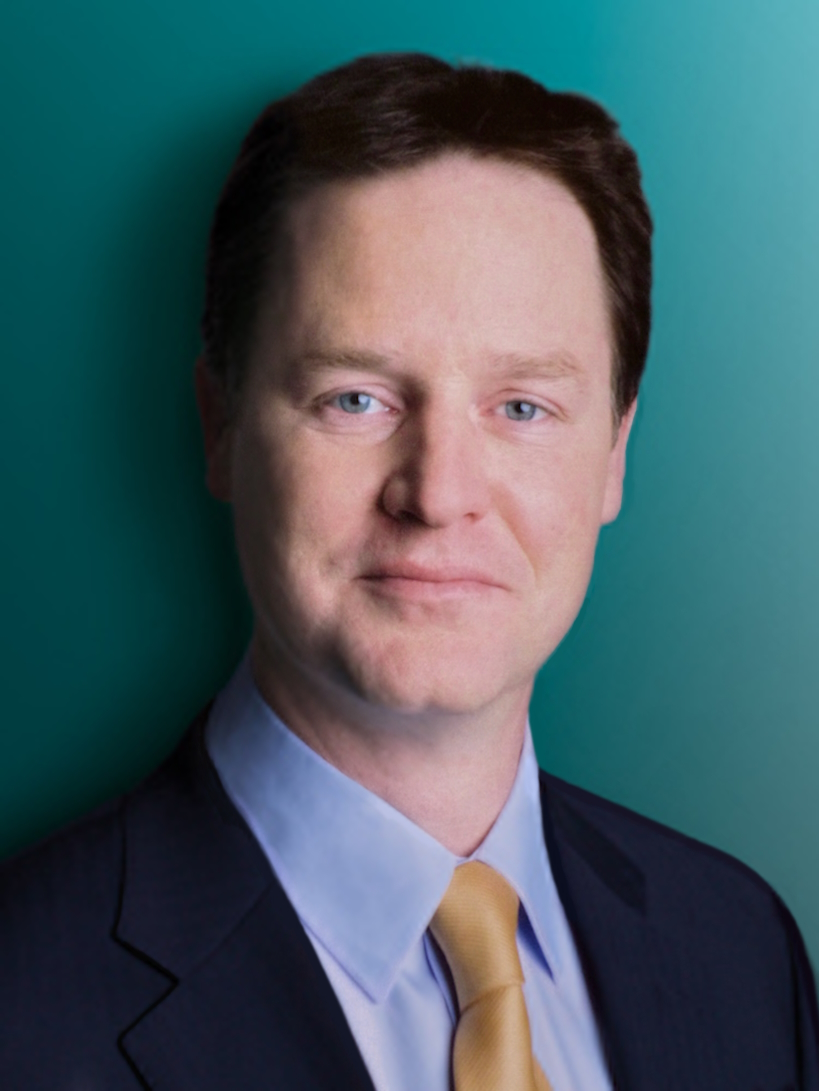
	First party	Second party	Third party
Leader	David Cameron	Ed Miliband	Nick Clegg
Party	Conservative	Labour	Liberal Democrats
Leader since	6 December 2005	25 September 2010	18 December 2007
Swing	Steady	▲10%	▼11%
Projected vote-share	35%	37%	15%
Councils	157	57	10
Councils +/–	▲4	▲26	▼9
Councillors	5,109	2,459	1,098
Councillors +/–	▲86	▲857	▼748
- The results in England. Northern Ireland results are not shown. White areas indicate elections were not held here in 2011.

The 2011 United Kingdom local elections were held on Thursday, 5 May. In England, direct elections were held in all 36 metropolitan boroughs, 194 second-tier district authorities, 49 unitary authorities and various mayoral posts, meaning local elections took place within all parts of England with the exceptions of seven unitary authorities (Cornwall, Durham, Northumberland, Isles of Scilly, Shropshire, the Isle of Wight and Wiltshire), and seven districts and boroughs (Adur, Cheltenham, Fareham, Gosport, Hastings, Nuneaton and Bedworth and Oxford). For the majority of English districts and the 25 unitary authorities who were "all-up" for election at the end of their four-year terms, these were the first elections since 2007. In Northern Ireland, there were elections to all 26 local councils. Elections also took place to elect members of most English parish councils.

On the same day, elections to the Scottish Parliament, National Assembly of Wales and Northern Ireland Assembly were held. A UK-wide referendum on whether to adopt the Alternative Vote electoral system for elections to the House of Commons and the Leicester South by-election was also held.

Labour, contesting its first elections under the leadership of Ed Miliband, finished narrowly ahead of the Conservatives. The BBC's projected national vote share put Labour on 37%, the Conservatives on 35% and the Liberal Democrats on 15%. Rallings and Thrasher of Plymouth University put Labour narrowly behind on 37% of the national vote, compared to 38% for the Conservatives and 16% for the Liberal Democrats.

== Background ==
Elections were due to be held to Scottish councils, but these had been postponed until 2012 to avoid clashing with the elections to the Scottish Parliament, which in 2007 had caused confusion among voters.

British, Irish, Commonwealth and European Union citizens living in the UK who were 18 or over on election day were entitled to vote in the local council and devolved legislatures elections. The deadline for voters in England, Wales and Northern Ireland to register to vote in the 5 May elections was midnight on Thursday 14 April 2011, whilst voters in Scotland had until midnight on Friday 15 April 2011 to register. Anyone in the United Kingdom who qualified as an anonymous elector had until midnight on Tuesday 26 April 2011 to register.

== Results ==
The Labour Party was described as obtaining "mixed results". Their support recovered following a string of poor local election results during Gordon Brown's tenure and they gained over 800 council seats, mostly off the Liberal Democrats. Labour's gains were overshadowed by the coinciding Scottish Parliament election where they were routed by the Scottish National Party. The Conservatives narrowly obtained more votes than Labour and gained a small number of seats. They were helped by the gaining additional seats from the Liberal Democrats in the south west, south, south east and East Anglia.

The election was a disaster for the Liberal Democrats, who lost 40% of the council seats they were defending (mostly to Labour) and lost majorities in 9 of the 19 councils they controlled, including strongholds in Sheffield and Hull. There were some surprising gains for the Conservatives against the Liberal Democrats, with councils previously considered strongholds for the latter, like North Norfolk, Vale of White Horse and Lewes changing hands. This led to some calls for Nick Clegg to resign. The losses coincided with the landslide rejection of the Alternative Vote referendum which had been supported by the Liberal Democrats and some members of the Labour Party.

== UK-wide results ==
Party	Councillors		Councils	
Party	Number	Change	Number	Change
Conservative	5,109	▲86	157	▲4
Labour	2,459	▲857	57	▲26
Liberal Democrats	1,098	▼748	10	▼9
DUP	175	▼3	0	▼2
Sinn Féin	138	▲9	1	▲1
UUP	99	▼16	0	Steady
SDLP	87	▼14	0	Steady
Green	79	▲14	0	Steady
Neighborhood association	48	▼3	1	Steady
Alliance	44	▲14	0	Steady
UKIP	8	▲1	0	Steady
Liberal	8	▼2	0	Steady
TUV	6	▲6	0	Steady
Green (NI)	3	Steady	0	Steady
BNP	2	▼11	0	Steady
PUP	2	Steady	0	Steady
Others	667	▼201	0	Steady
No overall control	n/a	n/a	79	▼17

Source: and Vote 2011: Northern Ireland Council Elections

=== Summary of English result ===
Party	Councillors		Councils	
Party	Number	Change	Number	Change
Conservative	5,109	▲86	157	▲4
Labour	2,459	▲857	57	▲26
Liberal Democrats	1,098	▼748	10	▼9
Green	79	▲14	0	Steady
Neighborhood association	48	▼3	1	Steady
Liberal	8	▼2	0	Steady
UKIP	7	0	0	Steady
BNP	2	▼11	0	Steady
Others	640	▼207	0	Steady
No overall control	n/a	n/a	54	▼19

== England ==
=== Metropolitan boroughs ===
All 36 English Metropolitan borough councils one third of their seats were up for election.

Council	Previous control	Result	Details
Barnsley	Labour	Labour hold	Details
Birmingham	No overall control	No overall control hold	Details
Bolton	No overall control	Labour gain	Details
Bradford	No overall control	No overall control hold	Details
Bury	No overall control	Labour gain	Details
Calderdale	No overall control	No overall control hold	Details
Coventry	Labour	Labour hold	Details
Doncaster	Labour	Labour hold	Details
Dudley	Conservative	Conservative hold	Details
Gateshead	Labour	Labour hold	Details
Kirklees	No overall control	No overall control hold	Details
Knowsley	Labour	Labour hold	Details
Leeds	No overall control	Labour gain	Details
Liverpool	Labour	Labour hold	Details
Manchester	Labour	Labour hold	Details
Newcastle upon Tyne	Liberal Democrats	Labour gain	Details
North Tyneside	No overall control	Labour gain	Details
Oldham	No overall control	Labour gain	Details
Rochdale	No overall control	No overall control hold	Details
Rotherham	Labour	Labour hold	Details
St Helens	Labour	Labour hold	Details
Salford	Labour	Labour hold	Details
Sandwell	Labour	Labour hold	Details
Sefton	No overall control	No overall control hold	Details
Sheffield	No overall control	Labour gain	Details
Solihull	No overall control	Conservative gain	Details
South Tyneside	Labour	Labour hold	Details
Stockport	Liberal Democrats	No overall control gain	Details
Sunderland	Labour	Labour hold	Details
Tameside	Labour	Labour hold	Details
Trafford	Conservative	Conservative hold	Details
Wakefield	Labour	Labour hold	Details
Walsall	Conservative	No overall control gain	Details
Wigan	Labour	Labour hold	Details
Wirral	No overall control	No overall control hold	Details
Wolverhampton	No overall control	Labour gain	Details

=== Unitary authorities ===
==== Whole council ====
In 30 English Unitary authorities the whole council were up for election.

Council	Previous control	Result	Details
Bath and North East Somerset	No overall control	No overall control hold	Details
Bedford	No overall control	No overall control hold	Details
Blackpool	Conservative	Labour gain	Details
Bournemouth	Conservative	Conservative hold	Details
Bracknell Forest	Conservative	Conservative hold	Details
Brighton and Hove	No overall control	No overall control hold	Details
Central Bedfordshire	Conservative	Conservative hold	Details
Cheshire East	Conservative	Conservative hold	Details
Cheshire West and Chester	Conservative	Conservative hold	Details
Darlington	Labour	Labour hold	Details
East Riding of Yorkshire	Conservative	Conservative hold	Details
Herefordshire	Conservative	Conservative hold	Details
Leicester	Labour	Labour hold	Details
Luton	Labour	Labour hold	Details
Medway	Conservative	Conservative hold	Details
Middlesbrough	Labour	Labour hold	Details
North Lincolnshire	Labour	Conservative gain	Details
North Somerset	Conservative	Conservative hold	Details
Nottingham	Labour	Labour hold	Details
Poole	Conservative	No overall control gain	Details
Redcar and Cleveland	No overall control	Labour gain	Details
Rutland	Conservative	Conservative hold	Details
South Gloucestershire	No overall control	No overall control hold	Details
Stockton-on-Tees	No overall control	No overall control hold	Details
Stoke-on-Trent	No overall control	Labour gain	Details
Telford and Wrekin	No overall control	Labour gain	Details
Torbay	Conservative	Conservative hold	Details
West Berkshire	Conservative	Conservative hold	Details
Windsor and Maidenhead	Conservative	Conservative hold	Details
York	No overall control	Labour gain	Details

==== Third of council ====
In 19 English Unitary authorities one third of the council were up for election.

Council	Previous control	Result	Details
Blackburn with Darwen	No overall control	Labour gain	Details
Bristol	Liberal Democrats	No overall control gain	Details
Derby	No overall control	No overall control hold	Details
Halton	Labour	Labour hold	Details
Hartlepool	Labour	Labour hold	Details
Kingston upon Hull	Liberal Democrats	Labour gain	Details
Milton Keynes	No overall control	No overall control hold	Details
North East Lincolnshire	No overall control	No overall control hold	Details
Peterborough	Conservative	Conservative hold	Details
Plymouth	Conservative	Conservative hold	Details
Portsmouth	Liberal Democrats	Liberal Democrats hold	Details
Reading	No overall control	No overall control hold	Details
Slough	Labour	Labour hold	Details
Southampton	Conservative	Conservative hold	Details
Southend-on-Sea	Conservative	Conservative hold	Details
Swindon	Conservative	Conservative hold	Details
Thurrock	No overall control	No overall control hold	Details
Warrington	No overall control	Labour gain	Details
Wokingham	Conservative	Conservative hold	Details

=== Non-metropolitan districts ===
==== Whole council ====
In 127 English district authorities the whole council were up for election.

Council	Previous control	Result	Details
Allerdale	No overall control	No overall control hold	Details
Arun	Conservative	Conservative hold	Details
Ashfield	No overall control	Labour gain	Details
Ashford	Conservative	Conservative hold	Details
Aylesbury Vale	Conservative	Conservative hold	Details
Babergh	No overall control	No overall control hold	Details
Barrow-in-Furness	No overall control	Labour gain	Details
Blaby	Conservative	Conservative hold	Details
Bolsover	Labour	Labour hold	Details
Boston	Boston Bypass Independents	Conservative gain	Details
Braintree	Conservative	Conservative hold	Details
Breckland	Conservative	Conservative hold	Details
Broadland	Conservative	Conservative hold	Details
Bromsgrove	Conservative	Conservative hold	Details
Broxtowe	No overall control	No overall control hold	Details
Canterbury	Conservative	Conservative hold	Details
Charnwood	Conservative	Conservative hold	Details
Chelmsford	Conservative	Conservative hold	Details
Chesterfield	Liberal Democrats	Labour gain	Details
Chichester	Conservative	Conservative hold	Details
Chiltern	Conservative	Conservative hold	Details
Christchurch	Conservative	Conservative hold	Details
Copeland	Labour	Labour hold	Details
Corby	Labour	Labour hold	Details
Cotswold	Conservative	Conservative hold	Details
Dacorum	Conservative	Conservative hold	Details
Dartford	Conservative	Conservative hold	Details
Derbyshire Dales	Conservative	Conservative hold	Details
Dover	Conservative	Conservative hold	Details
Eastbourne	Liberal Democrats	Liberal Democrats hold	Details
East Cambridgeshire	Conservative	Conservative hold	Details
East Devon	Conservative	Conservative hold	Details
East Dorset	Conservative	Conservative hold	Details
East Hampshire	Conservative	Conservative hold	Details
East Hertfordshire	Conservative	Conservative hold	Details
East Lindsey	No overall control	No overall control hold	Details
East Northamptonshire	Conservative	Conservative hold	Details
East Staffordshire	Conservative	Conservative hold	Details
Eden	No overall control	No overall control	Details
Epsom and Ewell	Residents Association	Residents Association hold	Details
Erewash	Conservative	Conservative hold	Details
Fenland	Conservative	Conservative hold	Details
Forest Heath	Conservative	Conservative hold	Details
Forest of Dean	Conservative	No overall control gain	Details
Fylde	Conservative	Conservative hold	Details
Gedling	Conservative	Labour gain	Details
Gravesham	Conservative	Labour gain	Details
Guildford	Conservative	Conservative hold	Details
Hambleton	Conservative	Conservative hold	Details
Harborough	Conservative	Conservative hold	Details
High Peak	Conservative	No overall control gain	Details
Hinckley and Bosworth	Liberal Democrats	Liberal Democrats hold	Details
Horsham	Conservative	Conservative hold	Details
Kettering	Conservative	Conservative hold	Details
King's Lynn and West Norfolk	Conservative	Conservative hold	Details
Lancaster	No overall control	No overall control hold	Details
Lewes	Liberal Democrats	Conservative gain	Details
Lichfield	Conservative	Conservative hold	Details
Maldon	Conservative	Conservative hold	Details
Malvern Hills	Conservative	Conservative hold	Details
Mansfield	Independent	Labour gain	Details
Melton	Conservative	Conservative hold	Details
Mendip	No overall control	Conservative gain	Details
Mid Devon	No overall control	Conservative gain	Details
Mid Suffolk	Conservative	Conservative hold	Details
Mid Sussex	Conservative	Conservative hold	Details
New Forest	Conservative	Conservative hold	Details
Newark and Sherwood	Conservative	No overall control gain	Details
North Devon	Conservative	No overall control gain	Details
North Dorset	Conservative	Conservative hold	Details
North East Derbyshire	Labour	Labour gain	Details
North Kesteven	Conservative	Conservative hold	Details
North Norfolk	Liberal Democrats	Conservative gain	Details
North Warwickshire	Conservative	Labour gain	Details
North West Leicestershire	Conservative	Conservative hold	Details
Northampton	Liberal Democrats	Conservative gain	Details
Oadby and Wigston	Liberal Democrats	Liberal Democrats hold	Details
Ribble Valley	Conservative	Conservative hold	Details
Richmondshire	No overall control	No overall control hold	Details
Rother	Conservative	Conservative hold	Details
Rushcliffe	Conservative	Conservative hold	Details
Ryedale	No overall control	Conservative gain	Details
Scarborough	No overall control	No overall control hold	Details
Sedgemoor	Conservative	Conservative hold	Details
Selby	Conservative	Conservative hold	Details
Sevenoaks	Conservative	Conservative hold	Details
Shepway	Conservative	Conservative hold	Details
South Bucks	Conservative	Conservative hold	Details
South Derbyshire	Conservative	Conservative hold	Details
South Hams	Conservative	Conservative hold	Details
South Holland	Conservative	Conservative hold	Details
South Kesteven	Conservative	Conservative hold	Details
South Norfolk	Conservative	Conservative hold	Details
South Northamptonshire	Conservative	Conservative hold	Details
South Oxfordshire	Conservative	Conservative hold	Details
South Ribble	Conservative	Conservative hold	Details
South Somerset	Liberal Democrats	Liberal Democrats hold	Details
South Staffordshire	Conservative	Conservative hold	Details
Spelthorne	Conservative	Conservative hold	Details
St Edmundsbury	Conservative	Conservative hold	Details
Stafford	Conservative	Conservative hold	Details
Staffordshire Moorlands	Conservative	No overall control gain	Details
Suffolk Coastal	Conservative	Conservative hold	Details
Surrey Heath	Conservative	Conservative hold	Details
Swale	Conservative	Conservative hold	Details
Taunton Deane	No overall control	No overall control hold	Details
Teignbridge	No overall control	Conservative gain	Details
Tendring	No overall control	Conservative gain	Details
Test Valley	Conservative	Conservative hold	Details
Tewkesbury	No overall control	Conservative gain	Details
Thanet	Conservative	No overall control gain	Details
Tonbridge and Malling	Conservative	Conservative hold	Details
Torridge	No overall control	No overall control hold	Details
Uttlesford	Conservative	Conservative hold	Details
Vale of White Horse	Liberal Democrats	Conservative gain	Details
Warwick	Conservative	Conservative hold	Details
Waveney	Conservative	No overall control gain	Details
Waverley	Conservative	Conservative hold	Details
Wealden	Conservative	Conservative hold	Details
Wellingborough	Conservative	Conservative hold	Details
West Devon	No overall control	Conservative gain	Details
West Dorset	Conservative	Conservative hold	Details
West Lindsey	Conservative	Conservative hold	Details
West Somerset	Independent	Conservative gain	Details
Wychavon	Conservative	Conservative hold	Details
Wycombe	Conservative	Conservative hold	Details
Wyre	Conservative	Conservative hold	Details

==== Third of council ====
In 67 English district authorities one third of the council were up for election.

Council	Previous control	Result	Details
Amber Valley	Conservative	Conservative hold	Details
Basildon	Conservative	Conservative hold	Details
Basingstoke and Deane	Conservative	Conservative hold	Details
Bassetlaw	No overall control	Labour gain	Details
Brentwood	Conservative	Conservative hold	Details
Broxbourne	Conservative	Conservative hold	Details
Burnley	No overall control	No overall control hold	Details
Cambridge	Liberal Democrats	Liberal Democrats hold	Details
Cannock Chase	No overall control	No overall control hold	Details
Carlisle	No overall control	No overall control hold	Details
Castle Point	Conservative	Conservative hold	Details
Cherwell	Conservative	Conservative hold	Details
Chorley	Conservative	No overall control gain	Details
Colchester	No overall control	No overall control hold	Details
Craven	Conservative	Conservative hold	Details
Crawley	Conservative	Conservative hold	Details
Daventry	Conservative	Conservative hold	Details
Eastleigh	Liberal Democrats	Liberal Democrats hold	Details
Elmbridge	Conservative	Conservative hold	Details
Epping Forest	Conservative	Conservative hold	Details
Exeter	No overall control	No overall control hold	Details
Gloucester	No overall control	Conservative gain	Details
Great Yarmouth	Conservative	Conservative hold	Details
Harlow	Conservative	Conservative hold	Details
Harrogate	Conservative	Conservative hold	Details
Hart	Conservative	Conservative hold	Details
Havant	Conservative	Conservative hold	Details
Hertsmere	Conservative	Conservative hold	Details
Huntingdonshire	Conservative	Conservative hold	Details
Hyndburn	No overall control	Labour gain	Details
Ipswich	No overall control	Labour gain	Details
Lincoln	No overall control	Labour gain	Details
Maidstone	Conservative	Conservative hold	Details
Mole Valley	No overall control	No overall control hold	Details
Newcastle-under-Lyme	No overall control	No overall control hold	Details
North Hertfordshire	Conservative	Conservative hold	Details
Norwich	No overall control	No overall control hold	Details
Pendle	No overall control	No overall control hold	Details
Preston	No overall control	Labour gain	Details
Purbeck	No overall control	No overall control hold	Details
Redditch	Conservative	Conservative hold	Details
Reigate and Banstead	Conservative	Conservative hold	Details
Rochford	Conservative	Conservative hold	Details
Rossendale	Conservative	No overall control gain	Details
Rugby	Conservative	Conservative hold	Details
Runnymede	Conservative	Conservative hold	Details
Rushmoor	Conservative	Conservative hold	Details
St Albans	Liberal Democrats	No overall control gain	Details
South Cambridgeshire	Conservative	Conservative hold	Details
South Lakeland	Liberal Democrats	Liberal Democrats hold	Details
Stevenage	Labour	Labour hold	Details
Stratford-on-Avon	Conservative	Conservative hold	Details
Stroud	Conservative	No overall control gain	Details
Tamworth	Conservative	Conservative hold	Details
Tandridge	Conservative	Conservative hold	Details
Three Rivers	Liberal Democrats	Liberal Democrats hold	Details
Tunbridge Wells	Conservative	Conservative hold	Details
Watford	Liberal Democrats	Liberal Democrats hold	Details
Welwyn Hatfield	Conservative	Conservative hold	Details
West Lancashire	Conservative	Conservative hold	Details
West Oxfordshire	Conservative	Conservative hold	Details
Weymouth and Portland	No overall control	No overall control hold	Details
Winchester	Liberal Democrats	No overall control gain	Details
Woking	No overall control	Conservative gain	Details
Worcester	No overall control	Conservative gain	Details
Worthing	Conservative	Conservative hold	Details
Wyre Forest	Conservative	Conservative hold	Details

=== Mayoral elections ===
Five direct mayoral elections were held.

Local Authority	Previous Mayor	Mayor-elect	Details
Bedford	Dave Hodgson (Liberal Democrats)	Dave Hodgson (Liberal Democrats)	Details
Leicester	None (New post)	Sir Peter Soulsby (Labour)	Details
Mansfield	Tony Egginton (Mansfield Independent Forum)	Tony Egginton (Mansfield Independent Forum)	Details
Middlesbrough	Ray Mallon (Independent)	Ray Mallon (Independent)	Details
Torbay	Nicholas Bye (Conservative)	Gordon Oliver (Conservative)	Details

== Northern Ireland ==
Elections were held on the same day to local government in Northern Ireland.

Council	Previous control	Result	Details
Antrim	No overall control	No overall control	Details
Ards	DUP	No overall control	Details
Armagh	No overall control	No overall control	Details
Ballymena	DUP	DUP	Details
Ballymoney	DUP	DUP	Details
Banbridge	No overall control	No overall control	Details
Belfast	No overall control	No overall control	Details
Carrickfergus	No overall control	No overall control	Details
Castlereagh	DUP	No overall control	Details
Coleraine	No overall control	No overall control	Details
Cookstown	No overall control	No overall control	Details
Craigavon	No overall control	No overall control	Details
Derry	No overall control	No overall control	Details
Down	No overall control	No overall control	Details
Dungannon and South Tyrone	No overall control	No overall control	Details
Fermanagh	No overall control	No overall control	Details
Larne	No overall control	No overall control	Details
Limavady	No overall control	No overall control	Details
Lisburn	No overall control	No overall control	Details
Magherafelt	Sinn Féin	Sinn Féin	Details
Moyle	No overall control	No overall control	Details
Newry and Mourne	No overall control	No overall control	Details
Newtownabbey	No overall control	No overall control	Details
North Down	No overall control	No overall control	Details
Omagh	No overall control	No overall control	Details
Strabane	Sinn Féin	Sinn Féin	Details
