= Chiltern District Council elections =

Local government elections in Buckinghamshire, England

Chiltern District Council in Buckinghamshire, England was elected every four years from 1973 until 2020. From the last boundary changes in 2003 until the council's abolition in 2020, 40 councillors were elected from 25 wards.

== Political control ==
From the first election to the council in 1973 until its merger into Buckinghamshire Council in 2020, political control of the council was held by the following parties:

Party in control	Years
Conservative	1973–1995
No overall control	1995–1999
Conservative	1999–2020

=== Leadership ===
The leaders of the council from 2001 until its abolition in 2020 were:

Councillor	Party	From	To
Don Phillips	Conservative	22 May 2001	May 2004
Tom Dodd	Conservative	5 May 2004	May 2007
John Warder	Conservative	22 May 2007	May 2010
Nick Rose	Conservative	18 May 2010	13 May 2014
Isobel Darby	Conservative	13 May 2014	31 Mar 2020

== Council elections ==
- 1973 Chiltern District Council election
- 1976 Chiltern District Council election (New ward boundaries)
- 1979 Chiltern District Council election
- 1983 Chiltern District Council election
- 1987 Chiltern District Council election (District boundary changes took place but the number of seats remained the same)
- 1991 Chiltern District Council election (District boundary changes took place but the number of seats remained the same)
- 1995 Chiltern District Council election
- 1999 Chiltern District Council election
- 2003 Chiltern District Council election (New ward boundaries reduced the number of seats by 10)
- 2007 Chiltern District Council election (Some new ward boundaries)
- 2011 Chiltern District Council election
- 2015 Chiltern District Council election

== Council composition ==
Year	Conservative	Liberal Democrats	Chesham and District RA	Independent	Council control after election
2003	27	12	1	0	Conservative
2007	30	9	0	1	Conservative
2011	33	5	0	2	Conservative
2015	35	3	0	2	Conservative

== Results maps ==
2003 results map

2007 results map

2011 results map

2015 results map

== By-election results ==
=== 1995-1999 ===
Amersham on the Hill By-Election 12 September 1996
Party	Candidate	Votes	%	±%
Liberal Democrats		380	31.9	
Independent		344	28.9	
Conservative		313	26.7	
Labour		147	12.4	
Majority		36	3.0	
Turnout		1,189	30.4	
Liberal Democrats hold		Swing		

Lowndes By-Election 10 September 1998
Party	Candidate	Votes	%	±%
Liberal Democrats		365	54.0	+5.4
Conservative		278	41.2	+4.0
Labour		32	4.7	−9.5
Majority		87	12.8	
Turnout		675	43.3	
Liberal Democrats hold		Swing		

=== 1999-2003 ===
Asheridge Vale By-Election 11 November 1999
Party	Candidate	Votes	%	±%
Liberal Democrats		218	45.1	−4.5
Labour		132	27.3	+4.4
Conservative		105	21.7	−6.1
Green		28	5.8	+5.8
Majority		86	17.8	
Turnout		483	36.0	
Liberal Democrats hold		Swing		

Amersham on the Hill By-Election 30 March 2000
Party	Candidate	Votes	%	±%
Liberal Democrats		497	53.2	+6.7
Conservative		324	34.7	−3.4
Labour		72	7.7	−7.8
Green		42	4.5	+4.5
Majority		173	18.5	
Turnout		935	22.9	
Liberal Democrats hold		Swing		

St. Mary's By-Election 13 July 2000
Party	Candidate	Votes	%	±%
Liberal Democrats		254	51.9	+0.1
Conservative		150	30.7	−11.7
Labour		65	13.3	+7.6
Green		20	4.1	+4.1
Majority		104	21.2	
Turnout		489	47.3	
Liberal Democrats hold		Swing		

Townsend By-Election 7 June 2001
Party	Candidate	Votes	%	±%
Liberal Democrats		660	38.0	−11.7
Conservative		606	34.9	+3.2
Labour		326	18.8	+5.6
Green		145	8.3	+2.9
Majority		54	3.1	
Turnout		1,737		
Liberal Democrats hold		Swing		

=== 2003-2007 ===
Prestwood & Heath End By-Election 4 May 2006
Party	Candidate	Votes	%	±%
Conservative	Andrew Garnett	1,387	58.2	−4.0
Liberal Democrats	Brenda Barker	998	41.8	+4.0
Majority		389	16.4	
Turnout		2,385	46.6	
Conservative hold		Swing		

Great Missenden By-Election 19 October 2006
Party	Candidate	Votes	%	±%
Conservative	Robert Swayne	494	74.2	+9.8
Liberal Democrats	Michelle Gausman	149	22.4	−13.2
Labour	Sandra Moorcroft	23	3.5	+3.5
Majority		345	51.8	
Turnout		666	36.4	
Conservative hold		Swing		

=== 2007-2011 ===
Chalfont St Giles By-Election 25 September 2008
Party	Candidate	Votes	%	±%
Conservative	Michael Stannard	927	68.1	+0.6
Liberal Democrats	Paul Meakin	434	31.9	−0.6
Majority		493	36.2	
Turnout		1,361	25.4	
Conservative hold		Swing		

Amersham On The Hill By-Election 6 May 2010
Party	Candidate	Votes	%	±%
Conservative	Nigel Shepherd	1,125	46.9	−3.0
Liberal Democrats	Howard Maitland-Jones	1,073	44.7	−5.5
Labour	Peter Josep	203	8.5	+8.5
Majority		52	2.2	
Turnout		2,401	67.8	
Conservative hold		Swing		

=== 2011-2015 ===
Central By-Election 15 November 2012
Party	Candidate	Votes	%	±%
Conservative	Jonathan Rush	495	74.0	−1.1
Liberal Democrats	David Rafferty	62	9.3	−15.6
Labour	Stephen Agar	60	9.0	+9.0
UKIP	Alan Stevens	52	7.8	+7.8
Majority		433	64.7	
Turnout		669		
Conservative hold		Swing		

=== 2015-2020 ===
Amersham Town By-Election 18 February 2016
Party	Candidate	Votes	%	±%
Conservative	Jules Cook	489	50.2	+11.6
Liberal Democrats	Richard Williams	354	36.3	+3.3
UKIP	Richard Phoenix	67	6.9	−7.4
Labour	Robin Walters	64	6.6	−7.5
Majority		135	13.9	
Turnout		974		
Conservative gain from Liberal Democrats		Swing		

Great Missenden By-Election 4 May 2017
Party	Candidate	Votes	%	±%
Conservative	Vanessa Martin	416	53.3	+13.8
Liberal Democrats	Ruth Yeoman	175	22.4	+22.4
Green	Anna Brazil	163	20.9	+20.9
UKIP	Alan Stevens	26	3.3	+3.3
Majority		241	30.9	
Turnout		780		
Conservative gain from Independent		Swing		

Penn and Coleshill By-Election 16 November 2017
Party	Candidate	Votes	%	±%
Conservative	Jonathan Walters	697	80.6	N/A
Liberal Democrats	Neil Williams	168	19.4	N/A
Majority				
Turnout				
Conservative hold		Swing		

The Conservative candidate was previously elected unopposed.

Ridgeway By-Election 22 March 2018
Party	Candidate	Votes	%	±%
Conservative	Nick Southworth	268	38.2	+16.7
Labour	Mohammad Zafir Bhatti	230	32.8	+32.8
Liberal Democrats	Frances Kneller	203	29.0	+11.7
Majority		38	5.4	
Turnout		701		
Conservative gain from Independent		Swing		
