= 2011 Chiltern District Council election =

Local election in Wycombe, UK

2011 result map in Chiltern District

Elections to Chiltern District Council were held on 5 May 2011, alongside other local elections across the United Kingdom. Following the election the council remained under Conservative control.

== Results summary ==
2011 Chiltern District Council election
| Party | Seats Before | Change | Seats After |
|---|---|---|---|
| Conservative Party | 30 | ▲3 | 33 |
| Liberal Democrats | 9 | ▼4 | 5 |
| Others | 1 | ▲1 | 2 |

== See also ==
- Chiltern District Council elections
