= 2011 Hertsmere Borough Council election =

Local election in Hertfordshire, England

- 5 May 2011

13 out of 39 seats to Hertsmere Borough Council 20 seats needed for a majority
- Registered: 65,115
- Turnout: 39.9% (▼26.6%)

	First party	Second party	Third party
Party	Conservative	Labour	Liberal Democrats
Seats won	11	2	0
Seats after	35	4	0
Seat change	▲1	▲1	▼2
Popular vote	15,493	7,549	2,691
Percentage	59.7%	29.1%	10.4%
Swing	▼1.2%	▲2.4%	▲0.5%
- Winner of each seat at the 2011 Hertsmere Borough Council election. Wards in white were not contested.
Control before election
Conservative
Control after election
Conservative

The 2011 Hertsmere Borough Council election took place on 5 May 2011 to elect members of Hertsmere Borough Council in Hertfordshire, England. This was on the same day as other local elections.

One third of the council was up for election and the Conservative Party stayed in overall control of the council.

== Summary ==
=== Background ===
13 of the 39 seats on the council were being contested, with 2 sitting councillors standing down at the election, Conservative Darren Solomons and Liberal Democrat Anita Gamble. Meanwhile, the Liberal Democrat leader on the council Roger Kutchinsky contested Bushey Heath, instead of the ward he had previously held Bushey North.

=== Election result ===
The Conservatives gained 2 seats from the Liberal Democrats, but lost a seat to Labour, thus winning 11 of the 13 seats contested. This meant the Conservatives stayed in control of the council with 35 seats compared to 4 for Labour. Meanwhile, the defeats for the Liberal Democrats meant they no longer had any seats on Hertsmere council for the first time ever. Overall turnout at the election was 40.49%.

The Conservatives gained Bushey North and Bushey St James from the Liberal Democrats, while the Liberal Democrat leader came third in Bushey Heath. Labour candidate Richard Butler gained Borehamwood Kenilworth from the Conservatives, at the same election that his father Ernie Butler held Borehamwood Cowley Hill for Labour. The gain by 25-year-old Richard Butler meant Labour finished the election with more councillors than before the election for the first time since 1996.

2011 Hertsmere Borough Council election
Party	This election				Full council			This election		
Party	Candidates	Seats	Net	Seats %	Other	Total	Total %	Votes	Votes %	+/−
Conservative	{{{candidates}}}	11	▲1	84.6	24	35	89.7	15,493	59.7	–1.2
Labour	{{{candidates}}}	2	▲1	15.4	2	4	10.3	7,549	29.1	+2.4
Liberal Democrats	{{{candidates}}}	0	▼2	0.0	0	0	0.0	2,691	10.4	+0.5
UKIP	{{{candidates}}}	0	Steady	0.0	0	0	0.0	236	0.9	N/A

== Ward results ==
Incumbent councillors standing for re-election are marked with an asterisk (*). Changes in seats do not take into account by-elections or defections.

=== Aldenham East ===
Aldenham East
Party	Candidate	Votes	%	±%
Conservative	Charles Goldstein*	1,410	75.2	–5.4
Liberal Democrats	Ruth Irwin	250	13.3	N/A
Labour	Richard Kirk	214	11.4	+3.1
Majority		1,160	61.9	–7.5
Turnout		1,874	51.4	+11.3
Registered electors		3,713		
Conservative hold				

=== Aldenham West ===
Aldenham West
Party	Candidate	Votes	%	±%
Conservative	Dan Griffin*	1,122	72.4	–2.1
Labour	Sandra Huff	270	17.4	+4.3
Liberal Democrats	Robert Gamble	158	10.2	N/A
Majority		852	55.0	–6.3
Turnout		1,550	44.2	+9.5
Registered electors		3,607		
Conservative hold		Swing	▼3.2	

=== Borehamwood Brookmeadow ===
Borehamwood Brookmeadow
Party	Candidate	Votes	%	±%
Conservative	Sam Dobin	995	50.1	+4.1
Labour	Susan Maughan	860	43.3	+16.9
Liberal Democrats	Judith Sear	133	6.7	–8.9
Majority		135	6.8	–12.8
Turnout		1,988	36.9	–22.7
Registered electors		5,440		
Conservative hold		Swing	▼6.4	

=== Borehamwood Cowley Hill ===
Borehamwood Cowley Hill
Party	Candidate	Votes	%	±%
Labour	Ernie Butler*	1,125	60.9	+18.7
Conservative	Alan Plancey	723	39.1	+2.6
Majority		402	21.8	+16.1
Turnout		1,848	30.7	–23.4
Registered electors		6,051		
Labour hold		Swing	▲8.1	

=== Borehamwood Hillside ===
Borehamwood Hillside
Party	Candidate	Votes	%	±%
Conservative	Jean Heywood*	1,302	58.2	–4.3
Labour	Lee Petar	936	41.8	+4.3
Majority		366	16.4	–8.6
Turnout		2,238	33.9	–25.2
Registered electors		6,733		
Conservative hold		Swing	▼4.3	

=== Borehamwood Kenilworth ===
Borehamwood Kenilworth
Party	Candidate	Votes	%	±%
Labour	Richard Butler	859	56.8	+8.1
Conservative	Penny Swallow*	652	43.2	–8.1
Majority		207	13.6	N/A
Turnout		1,511	37.4	–22.5
Registered electors		4,193		
Labour gain from Conservative		Swing	▲8.1	

=== Bushey Heath ===
Bushey Heath
Party	Candidate	Votes	%	±%
Conservative	Paul Morris	1,845	75.3	–1.8
Labour	David Bearfield	322	13.1	+2.2
Liberal Democrats	Roger Kutchinsky*	282	11.5	–0.5
Majority		1,523	62.2	–2.9
Turnout		2,449	48.1	–26.0
Registered electors		5,123		
Conservative hold		Swing	▼2.0	

=== Bushey North ===
Bushey North
Party	Candidate	Votes	%	±%
Conservative	Leslie Winters	841	45.4	+1.0
Liberal Democrats	Eddie Sheridan	583	31.5	–9.7
Labour	Sam Russell	427	23.1	+8.7
Majority		258	13.9	+10.7
Turnout		1,851	39.3	–26.2
Registered electors		4,739		
Conservative gain from Liberal Democrats		Swing	▲5.4	

=== Bushey St. James ===
Bushey St. James
Party	Candidate	Votes	%	±%
Conservative	Carey Keates	1,238	51.8	+2.3
Labour	Tony Breslin	662	27.7	+14.1
Liberal Democrats	Kim Elliott	491	20.5	–16.4
Majority		576	24.1	+11.4
Turnout		2,391	44.6	–23.6
Registered electors		5,478		
Conservative gain from Liberal Democrats		Swing	▼5.9	

=== Elstree ===
Elstree
Party	Candidate	Votes	%	±%
Conservative	Morris Bright*	1,116	77.6	–0.1
Labour	Ian Feeney	322	22.4	+0.1
Majority		794	55.2	–0.2
Turnout		1,438	40.2	–27.3
Registered electors		3,620		
Conservative hold		Swing	▼0.1	

=== Potters Bar Furzefield ===
Potters Bar Furzefield
Party	Candidate	Votes	%	±%
Conservative	Ronald Morris*	1,281	61.4	–6.6
Labour	Jim Fisher	532	25.5	–6.5
Liberal Democrats	Susan Oatway	275	13.2	N/A
Majority		749	35.9	±0.0
Turnout		2,088	43.4	–25.9
Registered electors		4,871		
Conservative hold		Swing	0.0	

=== Potters Bar Oakmere ===
Potters Bar Oakmere
Party	Candidate	Votes	%	±%
Conservative	Robert Calcutt*	1,092	54.1	–12.5
Labour	John Doolan	566	28.0	–6.4
UKIP	David Rutter	236	11.7	N/A
Liberal Democrats	Michael Willett	125	6.2	N/A
Majority		526	26.1	–5.1
Turnout		2,019	37.0	–24.4
Registered electors		5,558		
Conservative hold		Swing	▼3.1	

=== Potters Bar Parkfield ===
Potters Bar Parkfield
Party	Candidate	Votes	%	±%
Conservative	Paul Hodgson-Jones*	1,876	68.9	–7.9
Labour	Derek Marcus	454	16.7	–6.5
Liberal Democrats	Peter Bonner	394	14.5	N/A
Majority		1,422	52.2	–1.4
Turnout		2,724	46.0	–21.8
Registered electors		5,989		
Conservative hold		Swing	▼0.7	
