= 2011 Eden District Council election =

2011 UK local government election

The 2011 Eden District Council election was held on Thursday 5 May 2011 to elect all 38 members to Eden District Council for a four-year term, the same day as other local elections in the United Kingdom. The council remained under no overall control. The turnout across the council was 43.3%.

== Results summary ==
2011 Eden District Council election
Party	Seats	Net gain/loss	Seats %	Votes %	Votes	+/−
Conservative	16	▲2	42.1			
Independent	13	▼6	34.2			
Liberal Democrats	9	▲4	23.7			
Labour	0	Steady	0.0			
Green	0	Steady	0.0			
BNP	0	Steady	0.0			

== Ward results ==
=== Alston Moor ===
Alston Moor (2 seats)
Party	Candidate	Votes	%	±%
Independent	Patricia Godwin	436	50.3	New
Conservative	Christopher Harrison	390	45.0	New
Labour	Allen Williams	242	27.9	New
Independent	Timothy Haldon	177	20.4	▼12.3
Independent	Peter Thompson	161	18.6	New
Total valid votes		866	99.4	
Rejected ballots		5	0.6	
Turnout		871	46.0	
Registered electors		1,894		
Independent hold				
Conservative gain from Independent				

=== Appleby (Appleby) ===
Appleby (Appleby) (1 seat)
Party	Candidate	Votes	%	±%
Independent	Alan Morgan*	Unopposed		
Registered electors		1,086		
Independent hold				

=== Appleby (Bongate) ===
Appleby (Bongate) (1 seat)
Party	Candidate	Votes	%	±%
Liberal Democrats	Andrew Connell	338	59.6	▲20.2
Conservative	Maurice Armstrong	229	40.4	New
Majority		109	19.2	N/A
Total valid votes		567	99.3	
Rejected ballots		4	0.7	
Turnout		571	37.1	
Registered electors		1,541		
Liberal Democrats gain from Independent		Swing		

=== Askham ===
Askham (1 seat)
Party	Candidate	Votes	%	±%
Conservative	Michael Slee	328	60.2	▼5.2
Liberal Democrats	Lynn Fossey	217	39.8	▲5.2
Majority		111	20.4	▼10.3
Total valid votes		545	97.0	
Rejected ballots		17	3.0	
Turnout		562	43.2	
Registered electors		1,301		
Conservative hold		Swing	▼5.2	

=== Brough ===
Brough (1 seat)
Party	Candidate	Votes	%	±%
Independent	John Smith*	Unopposed		
Registered electors		1,034		
Independent hold				

=== Crosby Ravensworth ===
Crosby Ravensworth (1 seat)
Party	Candidate	Votes	%	±%
Conservative	Joan Raine*	457	72.1	▲19.1
Liberal Democrats	Alan Taylor	177	27.9	New
Majority		280	44.2	▲38.3
Total valid votes		634	97.7	
Rejected ballots		15	2.3	
Turnout		649	50.3	
Registered electors		1,291		
Conservative hold		Swing	▼4.4	

=== Dacre ===
Dacre (1 seat)
Party	Candidate	Votes	%	±%
Independent	Hugh Harrison*	Unopposed		
Registered electors		1,169		
Independent hold				

=== Eamont ===
Eamont (1 seat)
Party	Candidate	Votes	%	±%
Independent	Harold Threlkeld*	324	57.2	▼42.8
Liberal Democrats	Dennis Carlton	242	42.8	New
Majority		82	14.5	N/A
Total valid votes		566	96.4	
Rejected ballots		21	3.6	
Turnout		587	44.8	
Registered electors		1,310		
Independent hold		Swing	▼42.8	

=== Greystoke ===
Greystoke (1 seat)
Party	Candidate	Votes	%	±%
Conservative	David Huxley	Unopposed		
Registered electors		1,157		
Conservative gain from Independent				

=== Hartside ===
Hartside (1 seat)
Party	Candidate	Votes	%	±%
Conservative	Sheila Orchard*	Unopposed		
Registered electors		1,025		
Conservative hold				

=== Hesket ===
Hesket (2 seats)
Party	Candidate	Votes	%	±%
Conservative	Lesley Grisedale*	581	53.5	▼46.5
Conservative	Debra Wicks	532	49.0	▼51.0
Liberal Democrats	Roger Burgin (Note: Roger Burgin was elected in 2007 as the candidate for the Liberal Democrats in the Penrith North ward.)	392	36.1	New
Total valid votes		1,085	96.7	
Rejected ballots		37	3.3	
Turnout		1,122	40.7	
Registered electors		2,759		
Conservative hold				
Conservative hold				

=== Kirkby Stephen ===
Kirkby Stephen (2 seats)
Party	Candidate	Votes	%	±%
Independent	Trevor Ladhams*	Unopposed		
Independent	Paul Richardson	Unopposed		
Registered electors		2,042		
Independent hold				
Independent gain from Conservative				

=== Kirkby Thore ===
Kirkby Thore (1 seat)
Party	Candidate	Votes	%	±%
Independent	John Sawrey-Cookson*	Unopposed		
Registered electors		1,209		
Independent hold				

=== Kirkoswald ===
Kirkoswald (1 seat)
Party	Candidate	Votes	%	±%
Independent	Mary Robinson*	Unopposed		
Registered electors		1,187		
Independent hold				

=== Langwathby ===
Langwathby (1 seat)
Party	Candidate	Votes	%	±%
Independent	John Holliday*	389	64.6	▼2.8
Green	Alan Marsden	213	35.4	▲2.8
Majority		176	29.2	▼5.6
Total valid votes		602	99.0	
Rejected ballots		6	1.0	
Turnout		608	42.7	
Registered electors		1,424		
Independent hold		Swing	▼2.8	

=== Lazonby ===
Lazonby (1 seat)
Party	Candidate	Votes	%	±%
Conservative	Gordon Nicolson (Note: Gordon Nicolson was elected in 2007 as the candidate for the Conservative Party in the Penrith North ward.)	306	50.2	New
Liberal Democrats	Fiona Miller	221	36.2	New
Green	Lynn Bates	83	13.6	New
Majority		85	13.9	N/A
Total valid votes		610	98.9	
Rejected ballots		7	1.1	
Turnout		617	47.1	
Registered electors		1,310		
Conservative gain from Independent		Swing		

=== Long Marton ===
Long Marton (1 seat)
Party	Candidate	Votes	%	±%
Liberal Democrats	Dorothy Spence	Unopposed		
Registered electors		993		
Liberal Democrats gain from Conservative				

=== Morland ===
Morland (1 seat)
Party	Candidate	Votes	%	±%
Independent	Michael Tonkin	Unopposed		
Registered electors		1,047		
Independent gain from Conservative				

=== Orton with Tebay ===
Orton with Tebay (1 seat)
Party	Candidate	Votes	%	±%
Conservative	Adrian Todd	370	64.0	▲14.4
Liberal Democrats	Margaret Wilcox*	208	36.0	▼14.4
Majority		162	27.41	N/A
Total valid votes		578	97.8	
Rejected ballots		12	2.0	
Turnout		591	48.2	
Registered electors		1,225		
Conservative gain from Liberal Democrats		Swing	▲14.4	

=== Penrith Carleton ===
Penrith Carleton (1 seat)
Party	Candidate	Votes	%	±%
Liberal Democrats	John Bowen	Unopposed		
Registered electors		1,264		
Liberal Democrats hold				

=== Penrith East ===
Penrith East (2 seats)
Party	Candidate	Votes	%	±%
Liberal Democrats	Michael Eyles*	Unopposed		
Conservative	John Lynch*	Unopposed		
Registered electors		2,132		
Liberal Democrats hold				
Conservative hold				

=== Penrith North ===
Penrith North (3 seats)
Party	Candidate	Votes	%	±%
Liberal Democrats	Judith Derbyshire	783	56.1	▲14.1
Conservative	David Whipp	574	41.1	▼11.6
Liberal Democrats	Robin Howse	532	38.1	New
Independent	Michael Davidson*	499	35.7	▼17.7
Labour	Geoffrey Rockliffe-King	304	21.8	▲3.0
Total valid votes		1,396	99.6	
Rejected ballots		5	0.4	
Turnout		1,401	37.6	
Registered electors		3,727		
Liberal Democrats hold				
Conservative hold				
Liberal Democrats gain from Independent				

=== Penrith Pategill ===
Penrith Pategill (1 seat)
Party	Candidate	Votes	%	±%
Conservative	David Harding	162	41.8	New
Liberal Democrats	John Tompkins	148	38.1	New
Independent	John Nicholson*	78	20.1	▼79.9
Majority		14	3.6	N/A
Total valid votes		388	97.5	
Rejected ballots		10	2.5	
Turnout		398	31.9	
Registered electors		1,249		
Conservative gain from Independent		Swing		

=== Penrith South ===
Penrith South (2 seats)
Party	Candidate	Votes	%	±%
Independent	Margaret Clark	Unopposed		
Conservative	Malcolm Temple*	Unopposed		
Registered electors		1,982		
Independent hold				
Conservative hold				

=== Penrith West ===
Penrith West (2 seats)
Party	Candidate	Votes	%	±%
Liberal Democrats	Dawn Stobbart	488	65.2	New
Conservative	John Thompson*	318	42.5	▼10.2
BNP	Ian Holt	94	12.6	New
Total valid votes		749	98.7	
Rejected ballots		10	1.3	
Turnout		759	29.2	
Registered electors		2,596		
Liberal Democrats gain from Independent				
Conservative hold				

=== Ravenstonedale ===
Ravenstonedale (1 seat)
Party	Candidate	Votes	%	±%
Liberal Democrats	Ian Torkington	244	59.4	New
Conservative	John Priestley	167	40.6	▼59.4
Majority		77	18.7	N/A
Total valid votes		411	98.1	
Rejected ballots		10	2.4	
Turnout		419	49.2	
Registered electors		852		
Liberal Democrats gain from Conservative		Swing	▲59.4	

=== Shap ===
Shap (1 seat)
Party	Candidate	Votes	%	±%
Liberal Democrats	Neil Hughes*	437	65.5	▲14.1
Conservative	Thomas Lowther	230	34.5	▼14.1
Majority		207	31.0	▲28.2
Total valid votes		667	98.8	
Rejected ballots		8	1.2	
Turnout		675	57.2	
Registered electors		1,180		
Liberal Democrats hold		Swing	▲14.1	

=== Skelton ===
Skelton (1 seat)
Party	Candidate	Votes	%	±%
Conservative	Kevin Beaty	Unopposed		
Registered electors		1,231		
Conservative gain from Independent				

=== Ullswater ===
Ullswater (1 seat)
Party	Candidate	Votes	%	±%
Conservative	Sydney Simpson*	Unopposed		
Registered electors		1,051		
Conservative hold				

=== Warcop ===
Warcop (1 seat)
Party	Candidate	Votes	%	±%
Independent	William Patterson*	Unopposed		
Registered electors		1,094		
Independent hold				
