= 2011 Brentwood Borough Council election =

2011 UK local election

Results of the 2011 Brentwood Borough Council election

The 2011 Brentwood Borough Council election took place on 5 May 2011 to elect members of Brentwood District Council in Essex, England as part of the 2011 United Kingdom local elections. One third of the council was up for election and no elections were held in Hutton Central, Hutton South or South Weald.

== Results ==
Party	Votes	%	Seats
Conservative Party	10,935	49.01	10
Liberal Democrats	5,972	26.76	2
Labour Party	3,327	14.91	1
UK Independence Party	1,375	6.16	0
English Democrats	110	0.49	0
Green Party	49	0.22	0
Independents	545	2.44	0
Total	22,313	100.00	13
Source: Andrew Teale

=== By ward ===
Brentwood North
Name of Candidate	Party	Votes	Percent
James Sapwell	Liberal Democrat	859	42.7
James Tumbridge	Conservative	719	35.8
Mamtaz Beekoo	Labour	281	14.0
Kenneth Gulleford	UK Independence Party	151	7.5

Brentwood South
Name of Candidate	Party	Votes	Percent
Michael Le-Surf	Labour	850	45.2
David Bishop	Conservative	726	38.6
Trevor Ellis	Liberal Democrat	306	16.3

Brentwood West
Name of Candidate	Party	Votes	Percent
William Russell	Conservative	958	45.0
Karen Chilvers	Liberal Democrat	948	44.6
Juliette Morrissey	Labour	221	10.4

Brizes and Doddinghurst
Name of Candidate	Party	Votes	Percent
Ann Naylor	Conservative	1213	58.7
Nina Cutbush	Liberal Democrat	338	16.4
Yvonne Maguire	UK Independence Party	308	14.9
Yvonne Waterhouse	Labour	206	10.0

Herongate, Ingrave and West Horndon
Name of Candidate	Party	Votes	Percent
Gordon Maclellan	Conservative	862	63.9
James Gulleford	UK Independence Party	177	13.1
Gareth Barrett	Labour	167	12.4
Linda Price	Liberal Democrat	142	10.5

Hutton East
Name of Candidate	Party	Votes	Percent
Christopher Hossack	Conservative	663	54.5
John Pickard	Labour	205	16.8
Stuart Gulleford	UK Independence Party	190	15.6
June Spencer	Liberal Democrat	159	13.1

Hutton North
Name of Candidate	Party	Votes	Percent
Russell Quirk	Conservative	636	41.8
Graham Soames	Independent	545	35.8
Timothy Waterhouse	Labour	150	9.9
Stephen Tyrrell	Liberal Democrat	141	9.3
Janice Gearon-Simm	Green Party	49	3.2

Ingatestone, Fryerning and Mountnessing
Name of Candidate	Party	Votes	Percent
Noelle Hones	Conservative	1311	55.1
Keith Sparling	Conservative	1223	
Jane Winter	Labour	375	15.8
Patricia Dedman	Labour	360	
Janette Gulleford	UK Independence Party	358	15.0
Kristiana Papi	Liberal Democrat	336	14.1
Colin Brown	Liberal Democrat	328	

Pilgrims Hatch
Name of Candidate	Party	Votes	Percent
Victoria Davies	Liberal Democrat	1091	57.2
John Kerslake	Conservative	565	29.6
David Smith	Labour	253	13.3

Shenfield
Name of Candidate	Party	Votes	Percent
Philip Baker	Conservative	1286	56.7
Malcolm Featherston	Liberal Democrat	609	26.8
David Watt	UK Independence Party	191	8.4
Tim Barrett	Labour	184	8.1

Tipps Cross
Name of Candidate	Party	Votes	Percent
Madeline Henwood	Conservative	1018	70.0
Roberta Hall	Liberal Democrat	261	17.9
Michele Wigram	Labour	176	12.1

Warley
Name of Candidate	Party	Votes	Percent
William Lloyd	Conservative	978	45.9
Cyril Young	Liberal Democrat	782	36.7
Peter Mayo	Labour	259	12.2
Kim Burelli	English Democrats Party	110	5.2
