= 2011 Welwyn Hatfield Borough Council election =

Welwyn Hatfield Borough Council election

Results of the 2011 Welwyn Hatfield Borough Council election

The 2011 Welwyn Hatfield Borough Council election took place on 5 May 2011 to elect members of Welwyn Hatfield Borough Council in England. This was on the same day as other local elections.

== Election result ==
2011 Welwyn Hatfield Borough Council election
Party	This election			Full council			This election		
Party	Seats	Net	Seats %	Other	Total	Total %	Votes	Votes %	+/−
Conservative	12	▼3	70.6	27	39	81.3	17,543	53.6	-0.3
Labour	5	▲4	29.4	2	7	14.6	9,860	30.1	+9.2
Liberal Democrats	0	▼1	0.0	2	2	4.2	4,336	13.2	-9.4
Green	0	Steady	0.0	0	0	0.0	921	2.8	+0.6
Independent	0	Steady	0.0	0	0	0.0	84	0.3	N/A

== Ward results ==
=== Brookmans Park and Little Heath ===
Brookmans Park and Little Heath
Party	Candidate	Votes	%	±%
Conservative	Irene Dean	1,736	74.9	−2.4
Liberal Democrats	Jenny Blumson	293	12.6	−3.0
Labour	Donald Mahon	290	12.5	+5.4
Majority		1,443	62.3	+0.6
Turnout		2,319	50.9	−25.8
Conservative hold		Swing	▲0.3	

=== Haldens ===
Haldens
Party	Candidate	Votes	%	±%
Labour	Mike Larkins	898	44.1	+19.3
Conservative	Howard Hughes	787	38.7	−8.2
Liberal Democrats	Shirley Shaw	185	9.1	−13.8
Green	Berenice Dowlen	166	8.2	+2.8
Majority		111	5.4	N/A
Turnout		2,036	42.4	−24.6
Labour gain from Conservative		Swing	▲13.8	

=== Handside ===
Handside
Party	Candidate	Votes	%	±%
Conservative	Fiona Thomson	1,603	51.9	+7.4
Liberal Democrats	Nigel Quinton	970	31.4	−13.4
Labour	Sarah Carthew	515	16.7	+6.1
Majority		633	20.5	N/A
Turnout		3,088	58.7	−18.9
Conservative hold		Swing	▲10.4	

=== Hatfield Central ===
Hatfield Central
Party	Candidate	Votes	%	±%
Labour	Colin Croft	789	50.9	+15.6
Conservative	Michal Siewniak	535	34.5	−1.6
Liberal Democrats	Tom Bailey	226	14.6	−14.0
Majority		254	16.4	N/A
Turnout		1,550	32.0	−24.3
Labour hold		Swing	▲8.6	

=== Hatfield East ===
Hatfield East
Party	Candidate	Votes	%	±%
Conservative	Bernard Sarson	1,066	52.5	−0.1
Labour	Laura Cook	682	33.6	+10.6
Liberal Democrats	Lis Meyland-Smith	281	13.8	−10.5
Majority		384	18.9	−9.4
Turnout		2,029	41.1	−23.6
Conservative hold		Swing	▲5.4	

=== Hatfield Villages ===
Hatfield Villages
Party	Candidate	Votes	%	±%
Conservative	Lynne Sparks	742	59.7	+10.4
Labour	Bridie Croft	358	28.8	+2.5
Liberal Democrats	Ayesha Rohale	142	11.4	−13.1
Majority		384	30.9	N/A
Turnout		1,242	30.4	−31.3
Conservative hold		Swing	▲4.0	

=== Hatfield West ===
Hatfield West
Party	Candidate	Votes	%	±%
Conservative	Kim Langley	1,030	49.1	+1.5
Labour	Cath Watson	855	40.8	+10.9
Liberal Democrats	Hazel Laming	211	10.1	−12.4
Majority		175	8.3	−9.4
Turnout		2,096	36.8	−21.4
Conservative hold		Swing	▼4.7	

=== Hollybush ===
Hollybush
Party	Candidate	Votes	%	±%
Labour	Margarita Birleson	999	52.8	+19.4
Conservative	Sarah Atkinson	695	36.8	−10.4
Liberal Democrats	Gillian Armstrong-Bridges	197	10.4	−9.0
Majority		304	16.0	N/A
Turnout		1,891	35.6	−26.9
Labour gain from Conservative		Swing	▲14.9	

=== Howlands ===
Howlands (2 seats due to by-election)
Party	Candidate	Votes	%	±%
Conservative	David Hughes	769	41.8	+5.6
Labour	Alan Chesterman	688	37.4	+12.3
Conservative	Stan Tunstall	609	33.1	−3.1
Labour	Dean Milliken	568	30.9	+5.8
Green	Jill Weston	397	21.6	+5.9
Liberal Democrats	Caroline Duke	135	7.3	−15.7
Liberal Democrats	Jonquil Basch	100	5.4	−17.6
Turnout		1,840	40.3	−27.9
Conservative hold				
Labour gain from Conservative				

=== Northaw and Cuffley ===
Northaw and Cuffley
Party	Candidate	Votes	%	±%
Conservative	Adrian Prest	1,649	81.1	+6.1
Labour	Mike Alder	231	11.4	−6.7
Liberal Democrats	Nigel Bain	153	7.5	N/A
Majority		1,418	69.7	N/A
Turnout		2,033	47.7	−26.0
Conservative hold		Swing	▲6.4	

=== Panshanger ===
Panshanger
Party	Candidate	Votes	%	±%
Conservative	Darren Bennett	1,054	54.0	+2.6
Labour	Simon Chander	609	31.2	+12.8
Green	Mark Knight	146	7.5	+3.9
Liberal Democrats	Konrad Basch	143	7.3	−19.3
Majority		445	22.8	−2.0
Turnout		1,952	39.4	−28.5
Conservative hold		Swing	▼5.1	

=== Peartree ===
Peartree
Party	Candidate	Votes	%	±%
Labour	Steve Roberts	710	42.5	+16.4
Liberal Democrats	Louise Lotz	481	28.8	−6.1
Conservative	Roy Newman	478	28.6	−10.4
Majority		229	13.7	N/A
Turnout		1,669	32.2	−25.9
Labour gain from Liberal Democrats		Swing	▲11.3	

=== Sherrards ===
Sherrards
Party	Candidate	Votes	%	±%
Conservative	Pat Mabbott	1,199	51.3	−0.2
Labour	Tony Crump	719	30.8	+7.4
Green	Susan Groom	212	9.1	+2.7
Liberal Democrats	Frank Marsh	206	8.8	−9.8
Majority		480	20.5	−7.6
Turnout		2,336	52.8	−22.2
Conservative hold		Swing	▼3.8	

=== Welham Green ===
Welham Green
Party	Candidate	Votes	%	±%
Conservative	Les Page	778	61.6	−3.5
Labour	Diana Bell	291	23.1	+8.1
Liberal Democrats	Sheila Archer	109	8.6	−11.3
Independent	Peter Hastings	84	6.7	N/A
Majority		487	38.5	−6.7
Turnout		1,262	43.9	−24.8
Conservative hold		Swing	▼5.8	

=== Welwyn East ===
Welwyn East
Party	Candidate	Votes	%	±%
Conservative	Carl Storer	1,767	71.5	+3.8
Labour	John Pomroy	388	15.7	+6.0
Liberal Democrats	June Burnham	316	12.8	−5.5
Majority		1,379	55.8	+6.4
Turnout		2,471	51.9	−25.5
Conservative hold		Swing	▼2.2	

=== Welwyn West ===
Welwyn West
Party	Candidate	Votes	%	±%
Conservative	Mandy Perkins	1,046	69.5	+0.9
Labour	Ben Yetts	270	18.0	+8.6
Liberal Democrats	Jon Arch	188	12.5	−9.5
Majority		776	51.5	N/A
Turnout		1,504	48.1	+8.7
Conservative hold		Swing	▼3.9	
