= 2011 Peterborough City Council election =

Peterborough City Council election

Results of the 2011 Peterborough City Council election

The 2011 Peterborough City Council election took place on 5 May 2011 to elect members of Peterborough City Council in England. This was on the same day as other local elections.

== Election result ==
2011 Peterborough City Council election
Party	This election			Full council			This election		
Party	Seats	Net	Seats %	Other	Total	Total %	Votes	Votes %	+/−
Conservative	12	▼3	63.2	29	41	71.9	18,853	43.1	-1.8
Labour	4	▲3	21.1	1	5	8.8	13,751	31.4	+3.9
Independent	1	▼1	5.3	4	5	8.8	1,466	3.3	-4.7
Liberal	1	Steady	5.3	2	3	5.3	1,500	3.4	-0.7
Liberal Democrats	0	Steady	0.0	2	2	3.5	1,679	3.8	-6.6
Werrington Ind.	1	▲1	5.3	0	1	1.8	1,576	3.6	N/A
UKIP	0	Steady	0.0	0	0	0.0	2,102	4.8	N/A
English Democrat	0	Steady	0.0	0	0	0.0	1,394	3.2	-0.4
Peterborough Ind.	0	Steady	0.0	0	0	0.0	829	1.9	N/A
Green	0	Steady	0.0	0	0	0.0	614	1.4	-0.2
