= 2011 Rotherham Metropolitan Borough Council election =

2011 UK local government election

Results of the 2011 Rotherham Metropolitan Borough Council election

The 2011 Rotherham Metropolitan Borough Council election was held on Thursday 5 May 2011 to elect 21 members to the Rotherham Metropolitan Borough Council, the same day as other local elections in the United Kingdom. It elected one-third of the council's 63 members to a four-year term. Labour held control of the council after the election.

== Results summary ==
2011 Rotherham Metropolitan Borough Council election
Party	This election			Full council			This election		
Party	Seats	Net	Seats %	Other	Total	Total %	Votes	Votes %	+/−
Labour	20	▲3	95.2	33	53	84.1	39,823	54.2	▲9.8
Conservative	1	▼2	4.8	7	8	12.7	15,798	21.5	▼1.3
UKIP	0	Steady	0.0	0	0	0.0	10,065	13.7	▲1.3
Independent	0	▼1	0.0	0	0	0.0	3,604	4.9	▼4.9
BNP	0	Steady	0.0	2	2	3.2	2,647	3.6	▼3.6
Liberal Democrats	0	Steady	0.0	0	0	0.0	1,100	1.5	▼1.7
TUSC	0	Steady	0.0	0	0	0.0	211	0.3	New
Green	0	Steady	0.0	0	0	0.0	164	0.2	▼0.1
John Lilburne Democratic Party	0	Steady	0.0	0	0	0.0	128	0.2	New

== Ward results ==
=== Anston and Woodsetts ===
Anston and Woodsetts
Party	Candidate	Votes	%	±%
Labour	Judith Dalton	1,562	40.2	▼4.7
Conservative	Simon Edmundson	965	24.8	▼9.8
Independent	Clive Jepson	462	11.9	New
Independent	Stuart Thornton	406	10.5	New
UKIP	Denise Hickson	326	8.4	▼12.1
Green	Charles Foulstone	164	4.2	New
Majority		597	15.4	▲5.1
Total valid votes		3,885	43.6	
Turnout			43.9	
Registered electors		8,910		
Labour hold		Swing	▲2.6	

=== Boston Castle ===
Boston Castle
Party	Candidate	Votes	%	±%
Labour	Peter Wootton*	1,836	44.6	▲5.2
Conservative	Ashiq Hussain	1,156	28.1	▲2.5
UKIP	Harry Woffenden	606	14.7	▲6.5
Liberal Democrats	Eric Shaw	303	7.4	▼10.2
TUSC	Chris Bingham	211	5.1	New
Majority		680	16.5	▲2.7
Total valid votes		4,112	44.0	
Turnout			44.3	
Registered electors		9,347		
Labour hold		Swing	▲1.4	

=== Brinsworth and Catcliffe ===
Brinsworth and Catcliffe
Party	Candidate	Votes	%	±%
Labour	Andrew Roddison	2,147	63.2	▲16.9
Conservative	Michael Cooke	668	19.7	▲1.1
BNP	Terry Fieldhouse	581	17.1	▼18.0
Majority		1,479	43.6	▲32.4
Total valid votes		3,396	37.7	
Turnout			37.9	
Registered electors		9,019		
Labour hold		Swing	▲7.9	

=== Dinnington ===
Dinnington
Party	Candidate	Votes	%	±%
Labour	Jane Havenhand*	1,725	52.7	▲5.5
Conservative	Patricia Beighton	761	23.2	▼7.4
Independent	David Smith	465	14.2	New
UKIP	Martin Hickson	324	9.9	▼12.2
Majority		964	29.4	▲12.8
Total valid votes		3,275	35.2	
Turnout			35.6	
Registered electors		9,299		
Labour hold		Swing	▲6.5	

=== Hellaby ===
Hellaby
Party	Candidate	Votes	%	±%
Labour	Jennifer Andrews	1,638	42.5	▲17.3
Conservative	Brian Cutts*	1,550	40.2	▼6.5
UKIP	Douglas Fairfax	664	17.2	▲2.7
Majority		88	2.3	N/A
Total valid votes		3,852	42.1	
Turnout			42.7	
Registered electors		9,153		
Labour gain from Conservative		Swing	▲11.9	

=== Holderness ===
Holderness
Party	Candidate	Votes	%	±%
Labour	Lyndsay Pitchley	2,450	69.2	▲6.9
Conservative	Keith Hunter	1,089	30.8	▼6.9
Majority		1,361	38.5	▲13.9
Total valid votes		3,539	37.4	
Turnout			38.2	
Registered electors		9,453		
Labour hold		Swing	▲6.9	

=== Hoober ===
Hoober
Party	Candidate	Votes	%	±%
Labour	Jane Hamilton*	1,948	60.4	▼2.1
UKIP	Michael Pallant	572	17.7	New
Conservative	Brian Taylor	549	17.0	▼20.5
Liberal Democrats	Steven Scutt	155	4.8	New
Majority		1,376	42.7	▲17.7
Total valid votes		3,224	36.0	
Turnout			36.3	
Registered electors		8,962		
Labour hold		Swing	▼9.9	

=== Keppel ===
Keppel
Party	Candidate	Votes	%	±%
Labour	Barry Kaye*	1,812	49.1	▲13.4
UKIP	David Cutts	866	23.5	New
Conservative	Michael Robinson	699	18.9	▲2.8
Liberal Democrats	Janice Middleton	314	8.5	▼11.1
Majority		946	25.6	▲18.4
Total valid votes		3,691	39.8	
Turnout			40.0	
Registered electors		9,275		
Labour hold		Swing	▼5.1	

=== Maltby ===
Maltby
Party	Candidate	Votes	%	±%
Labour	Christine Beaumont	1,881	59.2	▲30.3
BNP	Michael Burke	388	12.2	▼10.1
Independent	John Kirk	370	11.6	New
Conservative	Derek Johnson	322	10.1	▲2.0
Independent	Michael Conlon	215	6.8	New
Majority		1,493	47.0	N/A
Total valid votes		3,176	35.3	
Turnout			35.7	
Registered electors		8,994		
Labour gain from Independent		Swing	▲20.2	

=== Rawmarsh ===
Rawmarsh
Party	Candidate	Votes	%	±%
Labour	Neil Hamilton*	1,911	60.6	▼3.9
UKIP	Matthew Nichols	470	14.9	New
Conservative	Matthew Nichols	446	14.1	▼21.4
BNP	William Baldwin	327	10.4	New
Majority		1,441	45.7	▲16.7
Total valid votes		3,154	33.3	
Turnout			33.5	
Registered electors		9,461		
Labour hold		Swing	▼9.4	

=== Rother Vale ===
Rother Vale
Party	Candidate	Votes	%	±%
Labour	John Swift*	1,884	61.3	▲2.8
Independent	David Ridgeway	628	20.4	New
Conservative	Doris Hunter	562	18.3	▼3.5
Majority		1,256	40.9	▲4.2
Total valid votes		3,074	34.0	
Turnout			34.4	
Registered electors		9,039		
Labour hold		Swing	▼8.8	

=== Rotherham East ===
Rotherham East
Party	Candidate	Votes	%	±%
Labour	Barry Dodson*	1,951	64.1	▲10.2
BNP	Matthew Stevenson	369	12.1	New
Liberal Democrats	Mohammed Ilyas	328	10.8	▼9.2
Conservative	Christian Kramer	269	8.8	▼3.8
John Lilburne Democratic Party	Barry Ross	128	4.2	New
Majority		1,582	52.0	▲18.1
Total valid votes		3,045	33.9	
Turnout			34.0	
Registered electors		8,988		
Labour hold		Swing	▼1.0	

=== Rotherham West ===
Rotherham West
Party	Candidate	Votes	%	±%
Labour	John Foden*	2,130	61.9	▲16.6
UKIP	Caven Vines	941	27.4	▲15.0
Conservative	Anne Middleton	368	10.7	▲0.9
Majority		1,189	34.6	▲21.8
Total valid votes		3,439	37.4	
Turnout			37.7	
Registered electors		9,204		
Labour hold		Swing	▲0.8	

=== Silverwood ===
Silverwood
Party	Candidate	Votes	%	±%
Labour	Roger Stone*	1,700	48.2	▲12.4
UKIP	John Wilkinson	1,079	30.6	New
Conservative	Stephen Jones	750	21.3	▼7.3
Majority		621	17.6	▲10.4
Total valid votes		3,529	37.1	
Turnout			37.4	
Registered electors		9,502		
Labour hold		Swing	▼9.1	

=== Sitwell ===
Sitwell
Party	Candidate	Votes	%	±%
Conservative	John Gilding*	1,899	43.3	▼7.8
Labour	Tajamal Khan	1,545	35.3	▲10.2
UKIP	Valerie Wilkinson	938	21.4	New
Majority		354	8.1	▼17.9
Total valid votes		4,382	46.5	
Turnout			46.8	
Registered electors		9,427		
Conservative hold		Swing	▲9.0	

=== Swinton ===
Swinton
Party	Candidate	Votes	%	±%
Labour	John Doyle*	2,135	62.4	▲10.3
UKIP	Shaun O'Dell	823	24.1	▼1.5
Conservative	Beryl Brown	463	13.5	▼8.8
Majority		1,312	38.4	▲11.9
Total valid votes		3,421	38.3	
Turnout			38.4	
Registered electors		8,939		
Labour hold		Swing	▲5.9	

=== Valley ===
Valley
Party	Candidate	Votes	%	±%
Labour	Paul Lakin*	2,034	64.8	▲19.6
Conservative	Valerie Todd	639	20.3	▼1.2
BNP	Jason Pearson	468	14.9	▼2.6
Majority		1,395	44.4	▲20.7
Total valid votes		3,141	35.0	
Turnout			35.2	
Registered electors		8,978		
Labour hold		Swing	▲10.4	

=== Wales ===
Wales
Party	Candidate	Votes	%	±%
Labour	Dominic Beck	2,089	54.3	▲29.0
Conservative	Gillian Shaw	1,160	30.1	▼6.5
UKIP	Dennis Flynn	600	15.6	New
Majority		929	24.1	N/A
Total valid votes		3,849	44.7	
Turnout			45.0	
Registered electors		8,613		
Labour gain from Conservative		Swing	▲17.8	

=== Wath ===
Wath
Party	Candidate	Votes	%	±%
Labour	William Sangster	2,080	59.1	▼4.9
UKIP	Brian Bailey	917	26.0	New
Conservative	Linda Higgins	524	14.9	▼21.1
Majority		1,163	33.0	▲5.0
Total valid votes		3,521	38.5	
Turnout			38.9	
Registered electors		9,135		
Labour hold		Swing	▼15.5	

=== Wickersley ===
Wickersley
Party	Candidate	Votes	%	±%
Labour	Christopher Read	1,717	44.8	▲4.7
Independent	Robert Foulds	1,058	27.6	New
Conservative	Donald Ross	596	15.6	▼17.5
UKIP	Tina Dowdall	458	12.0	▼3.5
Majority		659	17.1	▲10.1
Total valid votes		3,829	41.6	
Turnout			42.0	
Registered electors		9,205		
Labour hold		Swing	▼11.5	

=== Wingfield ===
Wingfield
Party	Candidate	Votes	%	±%
Labour	Terence Sharman*	1,648	54.8	▲4.6
BNP	Marlene Guest	514	17.1	▼13.7
UKIP	Maureen Vines	481	16.0	New
Conservative	Basil Hammond	363	12.1	▼6.9
Majority		1,134	37.7	▲18.3
Total valid votes		3,006	33.4	
Turnout			33.6	
Registered electors		8,993		
Labour hold		Swing	▲9.2	
