= 2011 Tunbridge Wells Borough Council election =

2011 UK local government election

The 2011 Tunbridge Wells Borough Council election was held on Thursday 5 May 2011 to elect 17 members to Tunbridge Wells Borough Council, the same day as other local elections in the United Kingdom. It elected approximately one-third of the council to a four-year term, including 16 regularly scheduled elections and a by-election in Brenchley and Horsmonden. It was preceded by the 2010 election and followed by the 2012 election. The Conservative Party held control of the council. Turnout across the wards up for election was 46.2%.

== Results summary ==
2011 Tunbridge Wells Borough Council election
Party	This election			Full council			This election		
Party	Seats	Net	Seats %	Other	Total	Total %	Votes	Votes %	+/−
Conservative	14	▼2	82.4	25	39	81.3	18,022	55.3	▼1.9
Labour	1	▲1	5.9	0	1	2.1	4,597	14.1	▲8.2
UKIP	1	▲1	5.9	0	1	2.1	2,179	6.7	▲0.4
Independent	1	▲1	5.9	0	1	2.1	1,978	6.1	▲5.4
Liberal Democrats	0	▼1	0.0	6	6	12.5	5,440	16.7	▼11.2
Green	0	Steady	0.0	0	0	0.0	267	0.8	▼1.2
English Democrat	0	New	0.0	0	0	0.0	121	0.4	New

== Ward results ==
=== Benenden and Cranbrook ===
Benenden and Cranbrook
Party	Candidate	Votes	%	±%
Conservative	Linda Hall*	1,267	52.6	▼5.9
Independent	Kim Fletcher	859	35.7	New
Labour	Stephen Brown	283	11.7	New
Majority		408	16.94	
Total valid votes		2,409	98.9	
Rejected ballots		27	1.1	
Turnout		2,436	47.2	
Registered electors		5,163		
Conservative hold		Swing	▼20.8	

=== Brenchley and Horsmonden ===
Brenchley and Horsmonden (Note: The ward of Brenchley and Horsmonden was up for a by-election following the resignation of incumbent councillor Marcella Callow, who was last elected in the 2008 election.)
Party	Candidate	Votes	%	±%
Conservative	Jane March	1,521	78.3	▲15.9
Labour	Kevin Kerrigan	421	21.7	New
Majority		1,100	56.6	▲31.8
Total valid votes		1,942	99.0	
Rejected ballots		20	1.0	
Turnout		1,962	50.4	
Registered electors				
Conservative hold		Swing	▼2.9	

=== Culverden ===
Culverden
Party	Candidate	Votes	%	±%
Conservative	Nicholas Rogers	1,261	52.2	▼5.9
Liberal Democrats	Ian Williams	363	15.0	New
Labour	Veronica Kelly	328	13.6	New
Green	Richard Leslie	267	11.1	▼18.5
UKIP	Patricia Theophanides	196	8.1	▼4.2
Majority		898	37.7	▲8.7
Total valid votes		2,415	99.5	
Rejected ballots		13	0.5	
Turnout		2,428	42.4	
Registered electors		5,731		
Conservative hold		Swing	▼10.4	

=== Frittenden and Sissinghurst ===
Frittenden and Sissinghurst
Party	Candidate	Votes	%	±%
Independent	John Smith* (Note: John Smith was elected in 2007 as the candidate for the Conservative Party, but ran for reelection as an independent politician.)	501	55.2	New
Conservative	Joy Napier Temple	406	44.8	▼18.9
Majority		95	10.5	N/A
Total valid votes		907	98.5	
Rejected ballots		14	1.5	
Turnout		921	55.1	
Registered electors		1,673		
Independent gain from Conservative		Swing	▲37.1	

=== Goudhurst and Lamberhurst ===
Goudhurst and Lamberhurst
Party	Candidate	Votes	%	±%
Conservative	Edmund Hastie	1,126	67.4	▲2.8
Labour	Simon Fowler	224	13.4	New
Liberal Democrats	Marguerita Morton	181	10.8	▼13.0
Independent	Edward la Coste	139	8.3	New
Majority		902	54.0	▲13.2
Total valid votes		1,670	98.6	
Rejected ballots		24	1.4	
Turnout		1,694	51.3	
Registered electors		3,304		
Conservative hold		Swing	▼5.3	

=== Hawkhurst and Sandhurst ===
Hawkhurst and Sandhurst
Party	Candidate	Votes	%	±%
Conservative	Ronald Weeden*	1,172	55.2	▼16.4
Liberal Democrats	Keith Brown	683	32.2	▲3.7
Labour	David Burgess	269	12.7	New
Majority		489	23.0	▼20.1
Total valid votes		2,124	98.6	
Rejected ballots		30	1.4	
Turnout		2,154	46.7	
Registered electors		4,612		
Conservative hold		Swing	▼10.1	

=== Paddock Wood East ===
Paddock Wood East
Party	Candidate	Votes	%	±%
Conservative	Peter Waldock*	618	49.8	▼1.8
Liberal Democrats	Damion Coleman	353	28.4	▲15.9
Labour	Terence White	271	21.8	▲2.4
Majority		265	21.3	▼10.8
Total valid votes		1,242	98.3	
Rejected ballots		21	1.7	
Turnout		1,263	40.4	
Registered electors		3,127		
Conservative hold		Swing	▼8.8	

=== Paddock Wood West ===
Paddock Wood West
Party	Candidate	Votes	%	±%
Conservative	Stanley Ward*	703	56.7	▼22.3
Labour	Raymond Moon	299	24.1	▲3.1
Independent	Ronald Goodman	238	19.2	New
Majority		404	32.6	▼25.4
Total valid votes		1,240	99.4	
Rejected ballots		8	0.6	
Turnout		1,248	42.9	
Registered electors		2,911		
Conservative hold		Swing	▼12.7	

=== Pantiles and St. Mark's ===
Pantiles and St. Mark's
Party	Candidate	Votes	%	±%
Conservative	Glenn Hall*	1,701	69.3	▲5.2
Labour	Clive Brewer	374	15.2	New
Independent	Christopher Skelton	241	9.8	New
UKIP	Nikolas Frydas	139	5.7	▼3.1
Majority		1,327	54.1	▲17.1
Total valid votes		2,455	46.7	
Registered electors		5,254		
Conservative hold		Swing	▼5.0	

=== Park ===
Park
Party	Candidate	Votes	%	±%
Conservative	Sean Lockhart*	1,414	56.2	▼2.4
Liberal Democrats	Mark Mortimer	465	18.5	▼13.9
Labour	Nicholas Maltby	414	16.5	New
UKIP	June Moore	223	8.9	▼0.1
Majority		949	37.7	▲11.5
Total valid votes		2,516	99.3	
Rejected ballots		18	0.7	
Turnout		2,534	46.3	
Registered electors		5,469		
Conservative hold		Swing	▲5.7	

=== Pembury ===
Pembury
Party	Candidate	Votes	%	±%
Conservative	June Crowhurst*	1,196	56.1	▲1.9
Liberal Democrats	Robert Maddison-Brown	733	34.4	▼4.6
Labour	Isobel Kerrigan	202	9.5	New
Majority		463	21.7	▲6.5
Total valid votes		2,131	98.5	
Rejected ballots		32	1.5	
Turnout		2,163	48.5	
Registered electors		4,456		
Conservative hold		Swing	▲3.2	

=== Rusthall ===
Rusthall
Party	Candidate	Votes	%	±%
UKIP	Victor Webb	634	36.6	▲21.6
Conservative	Barry Edwards*	560	32.3	▼12.8
Liberal Democrats	Thomas Snook	540	31.1	▲3.7
Majority		74	4.3	N/A
Total valid votes		1,734	98.6	
Rejected ballots		25	1.4	
Turnout		1,759	49.2	
Registered electors		3,573		
UKIP gain from Conservative		Swing	▲17.2	

=== Sherwood ===
Sherwood
Party	Candidate	Votes	%	±%
Conservative	Lynne Weatherly	813	47.8	▲1.2
Labour	Ian Carvell	340	20.0	▲4.9
Liberal Democrats	Peter Lewis	235	13.8	▼14.1
UKIP	Christopher Hoare	192	11.3	▲0.9
English Democrat	Joanna Stanley	121	7.1	New
Majority		473	27.8	▲9.2
Total valid votes		1,701	35.3	
Registered electors		4,813		
Conservative hold		Swing	▼1.9	

=== Southborough and High Brooms ===
Southborough and High Brooms
Party	Candidate	Votes	%	±%
Labour	Dianne Hill	952	48.6	▲15.6
Conservative	John Chater*	801	40.9	▲3.5
UKIP	Christine Marshall	205	10.5	▲3.3
Majority		151	7.7	N/A
Total valid votes		1,958	98.9	
Rejected ballots		21	1.1	
Turnout		1,979	37.9	
Registered electors		5,219		
Labour gain from Conservative		Swing	▲6.0	

=== Southborough North ===
Southborough North
Party	Candidate	Votes	%	±%
Conservative	David Elliott*	829	52.4	▼2.2
Liberal Democrats	Jacqueline Prance	395	25.0	▼14.7
Labour	Nicholas Blackwell	220	13.9	▲8.1
UKIP	Derek Higgins	139	8.8	New
Majority		434	27.4	▲12.5
Total valid votes		1,583	98.6	
Rejected ballots		23	1.4	
Turnout		1,606	50.9	
Registered electors		3,156		
Conservative hold		Swing	▲6.3	

=== Speldhurst and Bidborough ===
Speldhurst and Bidborough
Party	Candidate	Votes	%	±%
Conservative	John Jukes	1,613	67.3	▼6.7
Liberal Democrats	Robert Baldock	517	21.6	▼4.4
UKIP	Eileen Gayler	265	11.1	New
Majority		1,096	45.8	▼2.3
Total valid votes		2,395	97.8	
Rejected ballots		55	2.2	
Turnout		2,450	53.3	
Registered electors		4,595		
Conservative hold		Swing	▼1.1	

=== St. John's ===
St. John's
Party	Candidate	Votes	%	±%
Conservative	Caroline Derrick	1,021	46.8	▲4.1
Liberal Democrats	Lesley Herriot*	975	44.7	▼5.7
UKIP	Joyce Matthews	186	8.5	▲1.5
Majority		46	2.1	N/A
Total valid votes		2,182	98.0	
Rejected ballots		44	2.0	
Turnout		2,226	44.2	
Registered electors		5,036		
Conservative gain from Liberal Democrats		Swing	▲4.9	
