= 2011 Forest Heath District Council election =

Forest Heath District Council election

Map of the results

The 2011 Forest Heath District Council election took place on 5 May 2011 to elect members of Forest Heath District Council in England. This was on the same day as other local elections.

== Summary ==
2011 Forest Heath District Council election
Party	Seats	Gains	Losses	Net gain/loss	Seats %	Votes %	Votes	+/−
Conservative	23			▲1	85.2	56.4	12,291	-0.8
Liberal Democrats	2			Steady	7.4	10.2	2,221	+0.8
Labour	1			▲1	3.7	12.6	2,742	+8.6
Independent	1			▼2	3.7	9.2	2,016	-8.1
UKIP	0			Steady	0.0	11.6	2,534	-0.5
