= 2011 Rochdale Metropolitan Borough Council election =

2011 UK local government election

Elections to Rochdale Metropolitan Borough Council in Greater Manchester, England were held on 5 May 2011, the same day as other Local Elections across England. One third of the council was up for election.

After the election, the composition of the council was:

- Labour 29
- Conservative 14
- Liberal Democrat 13
- Others 4

== Election result ==
Rochdale local election result 2011
Party	Seats	Gains	Losses	Net gain/loss	Seats %	Votes %	Votes	+/−
Labour	15	7	0	+7		50.8	29,573	+13.9
Conservative	5	3	0	+3		26.1	15,174	+0.2
Liberal Democrats	0	0	10	-10		17.4	20,093	-14.2
Respect	0	0	0	0		1.3	738	+0.1
Green	0	0	0	0		0.4	228	-0.1
National Front	0	0	0	0		0.3	190	+0.3
Independent	0	0	0	0		3.7	2,169	+2.5

== Ward results ==
=== Balderstone and Kirkholt ward ===
Balderstone and Kirkholt ward
Party	Candidate	Votes	%	±%
Labour	Phillip Bethel	1241	47.2	+18.1
Liberal Democrats	Paul Rowen	869	33.0	−4.2
Conservative	Philip Grantham	332	12.6	−7.5
National Front	Peter Greenwood	190	7.2	+7.2
Majority		349	14.2	
Turnout		2,655		
Labour gain from Liberal Democrats		Swing		

=== Bamford ward ===
Bamford ward
Party	Candidate	Votes	%	±%
Conservative	Maureen Sullivan	1367	39.5	−4.0
Liberal Democrats	William Hobhouse	1308	37.7	+0.6
Labour	James Brown	790	22.8	+3.4
Majority		59	1.7	−4.7
Turnout		3,465		
Conservative gain from Liberal Democrats		Swing		

=== Castleton ward ===
Castleton ward
Party	Candidate	Votes	%	±%
Labour	Jean Hornby	1380	48.7	+20.1
Independent	Ted Flynn	644	22.7	+6.0
Liberal Democrats	Anthony Smith	419	14.8	−15.0
Conservative	Ronald Crossley	393	13.9	−2.2
Majority		736	26.0	
Turnout		2,836		
Labour gain from Liberal Democrats		Swing		

=== Central Rochdale ward ===
Central Rochdale ward
Party	Candidate	Votes	%	±%
Labour	Farooq Ahmed	2869	75.5	+24.3
Liberal Democrats	Ghafar Khan	556	14.6	−22.2
Conservative	Roger Howarth	289	7.6	−4.5
Respect	Ajaz Ahmed	87	2.2	+2.2
Majority		2313	60.8	+46.4
Turnout		3801	49.0	
Labour hold		Swing		

=== East Middleton ward ===
East Middleton ward
Party	Candidate	Votes	%	±%
Labour	Donna Martin	1671	67.5	+20.6
Conservative	Susan Pawson	556	22.4	−2.7
Liberal Democrats	John Wilkins	250	10.1	−17.9
Majority		1,115	45.0	+26.0
Turnout		2477	31.0	
Labour hold		Swing		

=== Healey ward ===
Healey ward
Party	Candidate	Votes	%	±%
Conservative	Andrew Neilson	1,235	38.8	
Labour	Jason Beckett	1,116	35.1	
Liberal Democrats	Donald Wight	604	19.0	
Green	Ian Andrews	228	7.2	
Majority		118	3.7	
Turnout		3,183		
Conservative gain from Liberal Democrats		Swing		

=== Hopwood Hall ward ===
Hopwood Hall ward
Party	Candidate	Votes	%	±%
Labour	Susan Emmott	1767	64.7	+15.4
Conservative	Darren Bayman	654	24.0	−0.2
Liberal Democrats	James Ridley	308	11.3	−4.6
Majority		1.113	40.8	+15.7
Turnout		2,729		
Labour hold		Swing		

=== Kingsway ward ===
Kingsway ward
Party	Candidate	Votes	%	±%
Labour	Karen Burke	2,001	60.4	+10.7
Liberal Democrats	Sharon Taylor	543	16.4	−20.6
Conservative	Mudassar Razzaq	369	11.1	−2.6
Independent	Naim Mahmud	239	7.2	+7.2
Respect	Mohammed Miah	160	4.8	+4.8
Majority		1458	44.0	+31.8
Turnout		3,312	40.0	−16.0
Labour gain from Liberal Democrats		Swing		

=== Littleborough Lakeside ward ===
Littleborough Lakeside ward
Party	Candidate	Votes	%	±%
Conservative	Ann Stott	1076	39.4	−0.8
Labour	John Hartley	1002	36.6	+10.0
Liberal Democrats	Rosemary Jones	656	24.0	−9.2
Majority		74	2.7	−4.3
Turnout		2,734		
Conservative gain from Liberal Democrats		Swing		

=== Milkstone and Deeplish ward ===
Milkstone and Deeplish ward
Party	Candidate	Votes	%	±%
Labour	Mohammed Zaman	2440	64.0	+28.3
Conservative	Altaf Nadeem	692	18.2	+12.1
Respect	Javed Iqbal	491	12.9	−8.0
Liberal Democrats	Aasim Rashid	187	4.9	−32.3
Majority		1748	45.8	
Turnout		3,810	48.9	−12.7
Labour hold		Swing		

=== Milnrow and Newhey ward ===
Milnrow and Newhey ward
Party	Candidate	Votes	%	±%
Labour	Martin Rodgers	1081	37.9	+6.6
Liberal Democrats	Keith Swift	923	32.4	−5.9
Conservative	Keith Taylor	726	25.5	−1.9
Independent	Peter Oldham	120	4.2	+4.2
Majority		158	5.5	
Turnout		2,850	36.0	
Labour gain from Liberal Democrats		Swing		

=== Norden ward ===
Norden ward
Party	Candidate	Votes	%	±%
Conservative	Ann Metcalfe	1814	57.2	+21.0
Labour	Christopher Furlong	846	26.7	+10.9
Liberal Democrats	Nicholas Thornsby	511	16.1	−26.0
Majority		968	30.5	
Turnout		3,171		
Conservative hold		Swing		

=== North Heywood ward ===
North Heywood ward
Party	Candidate	Votes	%	±%
Labour	Raymond Dutton	1270	53.7	+19.9
Liberal Democrats	James MacSparran	531	22.4	−29.3
Independent	Doreen Brophy-Lee	290	12.3	+12.3
Conservative	David Garnett	275	11.6	−2.9
Majority		739	31.3	
Turnout		2,366	31.0	
Labour gain from Liberal Democrats		Swing		

=== North Middleton ward ===
North Middleton ward
Party	Candidate	Votes	%	±%
Labour	Alan Godson	1518	66.3	+14.8
Conservative	Christopher Chapman	557	24.3	−0.3
Liberal Democrats	Neil Proctor	215	9.4	−14.5
Majority		961	42.0	+15.1
Turnout		2,290		
Labour hold		Swing		

=== Smallbridge and Firgrove ward ===
Smallbridge and Firgrove ward
Party	Candidate	Votes	%	±%
Labour	Aftab Hussain	1510	56.6	+14.2
Conservative	Len Branton	591	22.1	−1.2
Liberal Democrats	Ghulam Rasool	569	21.3	−13.1
Majority		919	34.4	+26.4
Turnout		2,670		
Labour gain from Liberal Democrats		Swing		

=== South Middleton ward ===
South Middleton ward
Party	Candidate	Votes	%	±%
Labour	Peter Williams	1674	52.9	+13.9
Conservative	Bernard Braiden	1294	40.9	−0.5
Liberal Democrats	Clarice Cooper	196	6.2	−13.4
Majority		380	12.0	
Turnout		3,164		
Labour hold		Swing		

=== Spotland and Falinge ward ===
Spotland and Falinge ward
Party	Candidate	Votes	%	±%
Labour	Cecile Biant	1369	39.5	−1.0
Liberal Democrats	Mohammed Sajid	878	25.3	−6.6
Independent	Carl Faulkner	659	19.0	+6.9
Conservative	Sajad Ali	343	9.9	−5.6
Independent	Richard Todd	217	6.3	+6.3
Majority		491	14.2	+5.6
Turnout		3466	42.0	
Labour gain from Liberal Democrats		Swing		

=== Wardle and West Littleborough ward ===
Wardle and West Littleborough ward
Party	Candidate	Votes	%	±%
Conservative	Janet Darnbrough	1686	63.9	+9.6
Labour	David Finlay	746	28.3	+5.5
Liberal Democrats	Reginald Lane	206	7.8	−15.0
Majority		940	35.6	+4.2
Turnout		2638	32.0	
Conservative hold		Swing		

=== West Heywood ward ===
West Heywood ward
Party	Candidate	Votes	%	±%
Labour	Jacqueline Beswick	1510	67.2	+16.9
Conservative	Peter Winkler	519	23.1	−1.3
Liberal Democrats	Eric Wood	218	9.7	−15.6
Majority		991	44.1	+19.1
Turnout		2247	25.0	
Labour hold		Swing		

=== West Middleton ward ===
West Middleton ward
Party	Candidate	Votes	%	±%
Labour	Phillip Burke	1772	76.2	+21.5
Conservative	David Harris	406	17.5	+2.1
Liberal Democrats	Frank Cooper	146	6.3	−11.1
Majority		1,366	58.8	+21.6
Turnout		2324	27.0	
Labour hold		Swing		
