= 2011 Redditch Borough Council election =

2011 UK local government election

Map of the results

The 2011 Redditch Borough Council election to the Redditch Borough Council was held on 5 May 2011. All Council wards, apart from Central and Lodge Parks were voting in the local elections; in the Greenlands ward two councillors were up for election.

== Election results ==
Redditch local election result 2011
Party	Seats	Gains	Losses	Net gain/loss	Seats %	Votes %	Votes	+/−
Conservative	17	0	0	0	58.6		10,095	
Labour	11	2	0	+2	37.9		9,145	
Liberal Democrats	1	0	2	-2	3.4		2,379	
Green	0	0	0	0	0.0		1,366	

== Ward results ==
=== Abbey Ward ===
Abbey
Party	Candidate	Votes	%	±%
Labour	Alan Mason	800		
Conservative	Steve Bridge	625		
Liberal Democrats	Diane Thomas	424		
Green	Rosemary Kerry	90		
Majority		175		
Turnout		1,950	43.4%	
Labour gain from Liberal Democrats		Swing		

=== Astwood Bank and Feckenham Ward ===
Astwood Bank and Feckenham
Party	Candidate	Votes	%	±%
Conservative	Brandon Clayton	1,218		
Labour	John Fisher	524		
Liberal Democrats	Jennifer Treen	267		
Green	Kevin White	146		
Majority		694		
Turnout		2,164	45.6%	
Conservative hold		Swing		

=== Batchley and Brockhill Ward ===
Batchley and Brockhill Ward
Party	Candidate	Votes	%	±%
Labour	Luke Stephens	1,095		
Conservative	Roger Bennett	762		
Green	Loretta Griffin	142		
Liberal Democrats	Dale Cox	117		
Majority		333		
Turnout		2,121	36.7%	
Labour hold		Swing		

=== Church Hill Ward ===
Church Hill Ward
Party	Candidate	Votes	%	±%
Labour	Robin King	992		
Conservative	Kathy Haslam	768		
Liberal Democrats	David Gee	205		
Green	Lee Bradley	139		
Majority		224		
Turnout		2,104	33.1%	
Labour hold		Swing		

=== Crabbs Cross and Rural Ward ===
Crabbs Cross and Rural Ward
Party	Candidate	Votes	%	±%
Conservative	Andrew Brazier	1,087		
Labour	Monica Fry	510		
Liberal Democrats	Edward Kilworth	166		
Green	Yvonne Rhodes	120		
Majority		577		
Turnout		1,892	41.4%	
Conservative hold		Swing		

=== Greenlands Ward ===
Greenlands Ward
Party	Candidate	Votes	%	±%
Labour	Rebecca Blake	1,053		
Labour	Wanda King	944		
Conservative	Taff Davies	698		
Conservative	David Smith	639		
Liberal Democrats	Anthony Pitt	210		
Liberal Democrats	Ian Webster	154		
Green	Rylma White	139		
Majority		355		
Majority		246		
Turnout		2,049	32.0%	
Labour hold		Swing		

=== Headless Cross and Oakenshaw Ward ===
Headless Cross and Oakenshaw Ward
Party	Candidate	Votes	%	±%
Conservative	Carole Gandy	1,373		
Labour	Pattie Hill	997		
Green	Alistair Waugh	198		
Liberal Democrats	John Stanley	187		
Majority		376		
Turnout		2,769	40.3%	
Conservative hold		Swing		

=== Matchborough Ward ===
Matchborough Ward
Party	Candidate	Votes	%	±%
Conservative	Juliet Brunner	822		
Labour	Neal Stote	673		
Green	Emma Bradley	138		
Liberal Democrats	Rita Hindle	88		
Majority		149		
Turnout		1,730	37.4%	
Conservative hold		Swing		

=== West Ward ===
West Ward
Party	Candidate	Votes	%	±%
Conservative	David Bush	1,184		
Labour	John Witherspoon	567		
Liberal Democrats	Peter Merricks	106		
Green	Louise Deveney	104		
Majority		617		
Turnout		1,974	43.0%	
Conservative hold		Swing		

=== Winyates Ward ===
Winyates Ward
Party	Candidate	Votes	%	±%
Labour	Philip Mould	990		
Conservative	Dave Pellett	919		
Liberal Democrats	Simon Oliver	455		
Green	Bev Minto	150		
Majority		71		
Turnout		2,528	38.5%	
Labour gain from Liberal Democrats		Swing		
