= 2011 Watford Borough Council election =

2011 UK local government election

2011 local election results in Watford

Elections to Watford Borough Council in England were held on 5 May 2011. Three years in every four, a third of the council (12 councillors) retires and elections are held (in the fourth year, elections are held for county councillors).

In this council election, the Labour Party gained two seats; the Liberal Democrats and the Conservative lost one each. The Liberal Democrats remained firmly in control of the council. Four parties, Liberal Democrats, Labour, Conservative and Green, all put up candidates in every seat. There were also three UKIP candidates and one independent.

After the election, the composition of the council was:

- Liberal Democrat: 24
- Labour: 6
- Green: 3
- Conservative: 3

== Council election result ==
Watford local election result 2011
Party	Seats	Gains	Losses	Net gain/loss	Seats %	Votes %	Votes	+/−
Liberal Democrats	8	-	-1	-1	66.7	36.7%	9899	
Labour	3	+2	-	+2	25.0	28.0%	7553	
Conservative	-	-	-1	-1		23.5%	6333	
Green	1	-	-	-	8.3	9.9%	2663	
UKIP	-	-	-	-		1.1%	298	
Independent	-	-	-	-		0.8%	204	

== Ward results ==
Callowland
Party	Candidate	Votes	%	±%
Green	Steve Lawrence Rackett	1104	58.6	
Labour	Emma Clare Collins	424	22.5	
Conservative	Guy Anthony Miller	229	12.1	
Liberal Democrats	Patricia Gollop	128	6.8	
Majority		680	36.1	
Turnout		1885	34.97	
Green hold		Swing		

Central
Party	Candidate	Votes	%	±%
Liberal Democrats	Helen Lynch	901	42.1	
Labour	Fred Grindrod	772	36.1	
Conservative	Carole Ann Bamford	277	13.0	
Green	Dorothy Nixon	118	5.5	
UKIP	Renie Price	70	3.3	
Majority		129	6.0	
Turnout		2138	34.87	
Liberal Democrats hold		Swing		

Holywell
Party	Candidate	Votes	%	±%
Labour	Nigel Bell	1473	68.4	
Liberal Democrats	Janet Baddeley	343	15.9	
Conservative	Neil John Punter	251	11.7	
Green	Alison Wiesner	86	4.0	
Majority		1130	52.5	
Turnout		2153	35.03	
Labour hold		Swing		

Leggatts
Party	Candidate	Votes	%	±%
Labour	Asif Kaleem Khan	786	35.3	
Conservative	Amanda Grimston	670	30.1	
Liberal Democrats	Dennis Wharton	440	19.8	
Green	Ian Brandon	330	14.8	
Majority		116	5.2	
Turnout		2226	41.76	
Labour gain from Conservative		Swing		

Meriden
Party	Candidate	Votes	%	±%
Liberal Democrats	Susan Carole Greenslade	893	43.6	
Labour	Seamus Williams	584	28.5	
Conservative	David Charles Ealey	468	22.9	
Green	Iain Wadey	101	4.9	
Majority		309	15.1	
Turnout		2046	36.09	
Liberal Democrats hold		Swing		

Nascot
Party	Candidate	Votes	%	±%
Liberal Democrats	George Andrew Forrest	1285	45.6	
Conservative	Camilla Zaman Khawaja	1023	36.3	
Labour	Michael Barnes	328	11.7	
Green	Sally Rose Ivins	179	6.4	
Majority		262	9.3	
Turnout		2815	48.01	
Liberal Democrats hold		Swing		

Oxhey
Party	Candidate	Votes	%	±%
Liberal Democrats	Shirena Counter	1209	55.2	
Conservative	Richard Haxton Bamford	497	22.7	
Labour	Susan Janet Sleeman	357	16.3	
Green	Christine Winifred Chandler	129	5.9	
Majority		712	32.5	
Turnout		2192	42.34	
Liberal Democrats hold		Swing		

Park
Party	Candidate	Votes	%	±%
Liberal Democrats	Peter Lewis Jeffree	1302	43.4	
Conservative	Linda Ann Topping	1160	38.7	
Labour	Michael Jones	330	11.0	
Green	Alex MacGregor Mason	133	4.4	
UKIP	David Penn	75	2.5	
Majority		142	4.7	
Turnout		3000	50.49	
Liberal Democrats hold		Swing		

Stanborough
Party	Candidate	Votes	%	±%
Liberal Democrats	Derek Thomas Francis Scudder	1095	52.7	
Conservative	Penelope Margaret Edwards	521	25.1	
Labour	Adeyemi Frederick Oshunniyi	356	17.1	
Green	Caryn Elaine Argun	107	5.1	
Majority		574	27.6	
Turnout		2079	39.17	
Liberal Democrats hold		Swing		

Tudor
Party	Candidate	Votes	%	±%
Liberal Democrats	Kelly McLeod	879	41.7	
Conservative	Youseffe Fahmy	485	23.0	
Labour	Geoffrey Pearce	461	21.9	
UKIP	Daniel Channing	153	7.3	
Green	Clare Victoria Pitkin	128	6.1	
Majority		394	18.7	
Turnout		2106	44.54	
Liberal Democrats hold		Swing		

Vicarage
Party	Candidate	Votes	%	±%
Labour	Nasreen Shah	1259	50.1	
Liberal Democrats	Shameen Khan	691	27.5	
Conservative	Sally Punter	231	9.2	
Independent	Paul Baker	204	8.1	
Green	Helen Elizabeth Wynne	127	5.1	
Majority		568	22.6	
Turnout		2512	44.79	
Labour gain from Liberal Democrats		Swing		

Woodside
Party	Candidate	Votes	%	±%
Liberal Democrats	Alan Edward Burtenshaw	733	40.8	
Conservative	Anthony John Rogers	521	29.0	
Labour	John Young	423	23.5	
Green	Paula Mary Evelyn Brodhurst	121	6.7	
Majority		212	11.8	
Turnout		1798	33.95	
Liberal Democrats hold		Swing		
