= 2011 Stafford Borough Council election =

2011 UK local government election

Elections to Stafford Borough Council were held on 5 May 2011. All 59 seats on the council were up for election. There were elections held in 26 wards. The Conservative Party retained majority control of the council. Overall turnout was 45.93%, with the lowest turnout (31.1%) in Coton ward and the highest (54.7%) in Chartley.

== Election result ==
Stafford local election result 2011
Party	Seats	Gains	Losses	Net gain/loss	Seats %	Votes %	Votes	+/−
Conservative	38	5	6	-1	%	0	0	0
Labour	17	6	1	+5	%	0	0	0
Liberal Democrats	2	0	-3	-3	%	0	0	0
Green	1	+1	0	+1	%	0	0	0
Independent	1	0	0	0	0			

The total number of seats on the Council after the election was:

- Conservative Party - 38
- Labour - 17
- Liberal Democrats - 2
- Green Party - 1
- Independent - 1

== Results by ward ==
=== Barlaston and Oulton (2 seats) ===
Party	Candidate	Votes	%	±%
Conservative	Evan Gareth Rowland Jones	901		
Conservative	Lynne Bakker-Collier	793		
Liberal Democrats	John Russell	646		
Turnout			48.2%	

=== Baswich (2 seats) ===
Party	Candidate	Votes	%	±%
Conservative	Ann Edgeller	1,183		
Conservative	Paul Trainor	918		
Labour	Ann Millichap	631		
Labour	Diana Smith	537		
Liberal Democrats	Graham John Sellman	150		
Liberal Democrats	Paul Seabrook	111		
Turnout			54.4%	

=== Chartley (1 seat) ===
Party	Candidate	Votes	%	±%
Conservative	Frances Elizabeth Beatty	598	49.8%	
Independent	Susan Anita McKeown	261	50.2%	
Turnout			54.7%	

=== Church Eaton (1 seat) ===
Party	Candidate	Votes	%	±%
Liberal Democrats	Barry Stamp	576		
Conservative	Rose Atkinson	368		
Labour	Chris Plant	76		
Turnout			58.9%	

=== Common (2 seats) ===
Party	Candidate	Votes	%	±%
Labour	William Simpson	578		
Labour	Julian Thorley	543		
Conservative	Ray Barron	395		
Conservative	Jenny Barron	357		
Independent	Simon Andrew Davies	297		
Green	Andrew Murray	170		
Turnout			42.1%	

=== Coton (2 seats) ===
Party	Candidate	Votes	%	±%
Labour	William Kemp	596		
Labour	Anthony Welch	494		
Conservative	James Edward George Cantrill	250		
Conservative	Len Bloomer	236		
Turnout			31.1%	

=== Eccleshall (3 seats) ===
Party	Candidate	Votes	%	±%
Conservative	Frank Chapman	1,605		
Conservative	Peter Wallace Jones	1,581		
Conservative	Jeremy Michael Pert	1,425		
Labour	Cathy Gregory	654		
Labour	Ros Kennedy	510		
UKIP	Pauline Scott	420		
Turnout			47.8%	

=== Forebridge (2 seats) ===
Party	Candidate	Votes	%	±%
Liberal Democrats	Christine Baron	607		
Green	Tom Harris	495		
Labour	Maureen Compton	457		
Liberal Democrats	David Seary	358		
Green	Lisa Pearce	297		
Conservative	Keith Boardman	280		
Conservative	Rebecca Davis	229		
Turnout			45.1%	

=== Fulford (3 seats) ===
Party	Candidate	Votes	%	±%
Conservative	Tony Holmes	1,239		
Conservative	Michael George Dodson	1,182		
Conservative	Peter Roycroft	1,175		
Labour	Rob Chesworth	722		
Turnout			42.6%	

=== Gnosall and Woodseaves (3 seats) ===
Party	Candidate	Votes	%	±%
Conservative	Ann Kelly	1,699		
Conservative	Kenneth Williamson	1,619		
Conservative	Mike Smith	1,566		
Labour	Andrew Bevington	703		
Labour	Chris Malvern	628		
Labour	John Hartshorne	515		
Turnout			48.5%	

=== Haywood and Hixon (3 seats) ===
Party	Candidate	Votes	%	±%
Conservative	Jean Tabernor	1,207		
Conservative	Amyas Stafford Northcote	1,182		
Conservative	Alan Perkins	1,083		
Independent	Brendan McKeown	653		
Independent	Paul Gilbert	582		
Independent	Andrew Carrington	496		
Labour	Rolfe Pearce	468		
Independent	John Mosley	431		
Labour	Amy Louise Hollinshead	356		
Labour	Sharon Hollinshead	338		
Turnout			49.6%	

=== Highfields and Western Downs (3 seats) ===
Party	Candidate	Votes	%	±%
Labour	Maureen Bowen	945		
Labour	Aidan Godfrey	922		
Labour	Stephen O’Connor	851		
Conservative	Ivan Jennings	773		
Conservative	James Nixon	705		
Conservative	Carolyn Trowbridge	699		
Turnout			39.4%	

=== Holmcroft (3 seats) ===
Party	Candidate	Votes	%	±%
Labour	Frank James	1,043		
Conservative	Bryan Cross MBE	1,030		
Labour	Ravi Rai Bhakhri	980		
Labour	Alan Ramsay	956		
Conservative	Charles Simpson	944		
Conservative	Sue Francis	887		
BNP	Roland Thomas Hynd	151		
Turnout			43.7%	

=== Littleworth (3 seats) ===
Party	Candidate	Votes	%	±%
Labour	Rowan Draper	1,043		
Labour	Ian Hollinshead	1,006		
Labour	Michael Winkle	961		
Conservative	David Bowyer	902		
Conservative	Denis Skelland	897		
Conservative	Mary Jennings	885		
Turnout			43%	

=== Manor (3 seats) ===
Party	Candidate	Votes	%	±%
Labour	Angela Loughran	1,003		
Labour	Geoffrey Rowlands	912		
Labour	Patricia Rowlands	899		
Conservative	Ann Foster	608		
Conservative	Michael Eld	607		
Conservative	Neil Washington	488		
Liberal Democrats	Julia Towers	213		
Liberal Democrats	Robert Hine	175		
Turnout			39.4%	

=== Milford (2 seat) ===
Party	Candidate	Votes	%	±%
Conservative	Francis Finlay	1,200		
Conservative	Robert Stephens	1,084		
Labour	Ed Smith	452		
Labour	Vic Casambros	432		
Turnout			44.3%	

=== Milwich (1 seat) ===
Party	Candidate	Votes	%	±%
Conservative	Andrew Harp	616		
UKIP	Rosemary Herbert	157		
Turnout			51.5%	

=== Penkside (2 seats) ===
Party	Candidate	Votes	%	±%
Labour	Ralph Cooke	680		
Labour	Malcolm Millichap	622		
Conservative	Cathy Collier	392		
Conservative	Rosemary Simpson	372		
Turnout			37.6%	

=== Rowley (2 seats) ===
Party	Candidate	Votes	%	±%
Conservative	David Allan	868		
Conservative	Patrick Farrington	783		
Labour	Anne Hobbs	759		
Labour	Bob Hobbs	711		
Green	Kate Harding	222		
Liberal Democrats	Cathie Ginette Seville	146		
Turnout			51.7%	

=== Seighford (2 seats) ===
Party	Candidate	Votes	%	±%
Conservative	Mark Winnington	1,088		
Conservative	Raymond Sutherland	1,070		
Labour	Duncan Cooper	307		
Labour	Barrie Taylor	307		
Independent	Diane Key	268		
Turnout			51.7%	

=== St Michael's (2 seats) ===
Party	Candidate	Votes	%	±%
Conservative	Geoff Collier	735		
Conservative	Phillip Jones	733		
Labour	Lloyd Brown	541		
Labour	Kim Jones	446		
Independent	Lin Davies	341		
UKIP	Andrew Illsley	197		
Turnout			45.5%	

=== Stonefield and Christchurch (2 seats) ===
Party	Candidate	Votes	%	±%
Conservative	Joyce Farnham	845		
Independent	Phillip Leason	590		
Independent	Rob Kenney	504		
Labour	Michael Abbott	424		
Labour	Peter Young	378		
Turnout			42.8%	

=== Swynnerton (2 seats) ===
Party	Candidate	Votes	%	±%
Conservative	James Highfield	1,124		
Conservative	David Price	947		
Independent	Roy James	530		
UKIP	Daniel Scott	257		
Turnout			45.9%	

=== Tillington (2 seats) ===
Party	Candidate	Votes	%	±%
Conservative	Isabella Davies	660		
Conservative	Peter Goodland	602		
Labour	Jane Essex	560		
Labour	Anthony Nixon	504		
Green	Jeremy Milln	145		
Turnout			43.5%	

=== Walton (3 seats) ===
Party	Candidate	Votes	%	±%
Conservative	Mike Carey	1,009		
Conservative	Margaret Goodall	900		
Conservative	Mike Williamson	824		
Independent	Jill Hood	740		
Labour	Harry Brunt	656		
Labour	Julie Taylor	517		
Labour	Becky Sawyer	469		
Independent	Mark Green	469		
Turnout			46%	

=== Weeping Cross (3 seats) ===
Party	Candidate	Votes	%	±%
Conservative	Judith Dalgarno	1,750		
Conservative	John Francis	1,617		
Conservative	Michael Heenan	1,592		
Labour	Jack Barber	976		
Labour	John Boyle	726		
Labour	Victoria Soper	697		
Turnout			51.1%	
