= 2011 Surrey Heath Borough Council election =

2011 UK local government election

Results of the 2011 Surrey Heath Borough Council election

The 2011 Surrey Heath Borough Council election took place on 5 May 2011 to elect all members of Surrey Heath Borough Council the Conservatives won 35 of the 40 seats giving them a majority of 30.

== Result summary ==
Surrey Heath local election result 2011
Party	Seats	Gains	Losses	Net gain/loss	Seats %	Votes %	Votes	+/−
Conservative	35			+6	87.5			
Labour	2			0	5.0			
Liberal Democrats	1			-6	2.5			
Green	0			0	0.0			
Independent	2			0	5.0			
Others								

== Ward results ==
=== Bagshot ===
Bagshot (3 seats)
Party	Candidate	Votes	%	±%
Conservative	Glyn Carpenter	1,051		
Conservative	Alastair Graham	891		
Conservative	Valerie White	867		
Liberal Democrats	Gret Woodason	713		
Liberal Democrats	Meurig WIlliams	697		
Liberal Democrats	Paul Hutchinson	642		
Labour	Brian Baker	212		
Labour	Mick Sheehan	199		
Majority		154		
Turnout				
Conservative hold		Swing		
Conservative gain from Liberal Democrats		Swing		
Conservative gain from Liberal Democrats		Swing		

=== Bisley ===
Bisley (2 seats)
Party	Candidate	Votes	%	±%
Conservative	David Mansfield	689		
Conservative	Wynne Price	647		
Independent	Malcolm Vaughan	531		
Majority		116		
Turnout				
Conservative hold		Swing		
Conservative gain from Liberal Democrats		Swing		

=== Chobham ===
Chobham (2 seats)
Party	Candidate	Votes	%	±%
Independent	Judi Trow	784		
Independent	Pat Tedder	709		
Conservative	Christopher Rowbotham	701		
Conservative	Edmond Bain	672		
Majority		8		
Turnout				
Independent hold		Swing		
Independent gain from Conservative		Swing		

=== Frimley ===
Frimley (3 seats)
Party	Candidate	Votes	%	±%
Conservative	Anthony Mansell	1,020		
Conservative	Ian Sams	1,009		
Conservative	David Hamilton	988		
Liberal Democrats	Helen Senter	419		
Liberal Democrats	Bob Smith	416		
Liberal Democrats	Veronica Smith	392		
Labour	Suzanne Dobson	347		
Labour	Matthew Felgate	306		
Labour	Alan Barnard	261		
UKIP	Alexander Remfry	241		
Majority		569		
Turnout				
Conservative hold		Swing		
Conservative gain from Labour		Swing		
Conservative gain from Liberal Democrats		Swing		

=== Frimley Green ===
Frimley Green (3 seats)
Party	Candidate	Votes	%	±%
Conservative	Chris Pitt	1,044		
Conservative	David Allen	1,028		
Liberal Democrats	Alan Whittart	932		
Conservative	Kim Winsper	928		
Liberal Democrats	Duncan Clark	875		
Liberal Democrats	Angela Patterson	806		
Labour	Wendy Rowlands	190		
Labour	Siddick Enathally	183		
Majority		4		
Turnout				
Liberal Democrats hold		Swing		
Conservative gain from Liberal Democrats		Swing		
Conservative gain from Liberal Democrats		Swing		

=== Heatherside ===
Heatherside (3 seats)
Party	Candidate	Votes	%	±%
Conservative	Paul Ilnicki	1,586		
Conservative	Ian Cullen	1,405		
Conservative	Lexie Kemp	1,371		
Liberal Democrats	Lance Clarke	620		
Liberal Democrats	Graham Tapper	581		
Liberal Democrats	John Morley	563		
Majority		751		
Turnout				
Conservative hold		Swing		
Conservative hold		Swing		
Conservative hold		Swing		

=== Lightwater ===
Lightwater (3 seats)
Party	Candidate	Votes	%	±%
Conservative	Surinder Singh Gandhum	1,524		
Conservative	Timothy Dodds	1,515		
Conservative	John Winterton	1,429		
Liberal Democrats	Laurence Dearling	585		
Independent	Steve Owen	580		
Liberal Democrats	Lindsey Fellows	398		
Liberal Democrats	Ruth Hutchinson	374		
Labour	Seamus Terrett	277		
Majority		844		
Turnout				
Conservative hold		Swing		
Conservative hold		Swing		
Conservative hold		Swing		

=== Mytchett and Deepcut ===
Mytchett and Deepcut (3 seats)
Party	Candidate	Votes	%	±%
Conservative	Paul Deach	1,217		
Conservative	Craig Fennell	1,134		
Conservative	Joanne Potter	1,061		
Liberal Democrats	Michael Drew	761		
Liberal Democrats	David Whitcroft	687		
Liberal Democrats	Cindy Ferguson	627		
Labour	Pascal Aguilar	295		
Labour	Jacques Olmo	265		
Labour	Roy Veracx	247		
Majority		300		
Turnout				
Conservative hold		Swing		
Conservative gain from Liberal Democrats		Swing		
Conservative gain from Liberal Democrats		Swing		

=== Old Dean ===
Old Dean (2 seats)
Party	Candidate	Votes	%	±%
Labour	Margaret Moher	553		
Labour	Rodney Bates	526		
Conservative	Charles Barbor	337		
Conservative	Christopher Sawyer	324		
UKIP	Roger Webb	130		
Liberal Democrats	Fay Storey	91		
Liberal Democrats	Geoff Williams	51		
Majority		189		
Turnout				
Labour hold		Swing		
Labour hold		Swing		

=== Parkside ===
Parkside (3 seats)
Party	Candidate	Votes	%	±%
Conservative	Bev Harding	1,585		
Conservative	Edward Hawkins	1,563		
Conservative	Josephine Hawkins	1,438		
Liberal Democrats	Fran Bennie	727		
Majority		711		
Turnout				
Conservative hold		Swing		
Conservative hold		Swing		
Conservative hold		Swing		

=== St Michael's ===
St Michael's (2 seats)
Party	Candidate	Votes	%	±%
Conservative	Colin Dougan	918		
Conservative	Bob Paton	798		
Labour	Amanda Deallie	490		
Labour	Sue Helliwell	484		
Majority		308		
Turnout				
Conservative hold		Swing		
Conservative hold		Swing		

=== St Paul's ===
St Paul's (3 seats)
Party	Candidate	Votes	%	±%
Conservative	Bill Chapman	1,593		
Conservative	Vivienne Chapman	1,580		
Conservative	Audrey Roxburgh	1,574		
Liberal Democrats	Martin Smith	467		
Labour	Linda Philippson	339		
Majority		1107		
Turnout				
Conservative hold		Swing		
Conservative hold		Swing		
Conservative hold		Swing		

=== Town ===
Town (2 seats)
Party	Candidate	Votes	%	±%
Conservative	Richard Brooks	827		
Conservative	Kenneth Pedder	713		
Independent	Susan McKnight	402		
Liberal Democrats	Christine Stanley	190		
UKIP	Phyllis Harman	161		
Labour	Paul Tonks	151		
Liberal Democrats	Catherine Whitcroft	140		
Majority		311		
Turnout				
Conservative hold		Swing		
Conservative hold		Swing		

=== Watchetts ===
Watchetts (2 seats)
Party	Candidate	Votes	%	±%
Conservative	Charlotte Morley	989		
Conservative	John May	948		
Labour	Terry Bailey	456		
Labour	Murray Rowlands	437		
Liberal Democrats	Margaret Williams	172		
Majority		492		
Turnout				
Conservative hold		Swing		
Conservative hold		Swing		

=== West End ===
West End (2 seats)
Party	Candidate	Votes	%	±%
Conservative	Keith Bush	1,085		
Conservative	Adrian Page	1,024		
Liberal Democrats	Judy Douch	486		
Liberal Democrats	David Catley	390		
Majority		538		
Turnout				
Conservative hold		Swing		
Conservative hold		Swing		

=== Windlesham ===
Windlesham (2 seats)
Party	Candidate	Votes	%	±%
Conservative	Moira Gibson	1,102		
Conservative	Liane Gibson	1,055		
Liberal Democrats	Robert Hardless	315		
Labour	Richard Wilson	189		
Liberal Democrats	Reg Ward	52		
Majority		740		
Turnout				
Conservative hold		Swing		
Conservative hold		Swing		
