= 2011 South Holland District Council election =

2011 UK local government election

Results of the 2011 South Holland District Council election

The 2011 South Holland District Council election took place on 5 May 2011 to elect members of the South Holland District Council in England. It was held on the same day as other local elections.

== Results summary ==
South Holland District Council Election Result 2011
Party	Seats	Gains	Losses	Net gain/loss	Seats %	Votes %	Votes	+/−
Conservative	25	2	3	-1	67.57	56.50	25,950	+7.00
Independent	11	4	4	N/C	29.73	37.23	17,102	-3.09
Lincolnshire Independent	1	1	0	+1	2.70	1.80	827	+1.80
Liberal Democrats	0	-	-	0	0.00	1.75	802	-2.11
UKIP	0	-	-	0	0.00	1.08	496	+0.28
Labour	0	-	-	0	0.00	0.87	402	+0.14
BNP	0	-	-	0	0.00	0.48	220	-4.26
Green	0	-	-	0	0.00	0.29	133	+0.29

== Council composition ==
Following the last election in 2007, the composition of the council was:

↓
26	11
Conservative	Independent

After the election, the composition of the council was:

↓
25	11	1
Conservative	Independent	LI

LI - Lincolnshire Independents

== Ward results ==
Incumbent councillors are denoted by an asterisk (*). References -

=== Crowland & Deeping St. Nicholas ===
Crowland & Deeping St. Nicholas (3 seats)
Party	Candidate	Votes	%	±%
Independent	B. Alcock*	841	43.7	−3.7
Conservative	P. Przyszlak*	804	41.8	−7.3
Conservative	A. Harrison	696		
Independent	J. Astill*	675		
Conservative	G. Scholes	557		
Independent	P. Barrett	556		
Liberal Democrats	G. Mayley	279	14.5	
Turnout			38.6	+9.4
Independent hold		Swing		
Conservative hold		Swing		
Conservative hold		Swing		

=== Donington Quadring & Gosberton ===
Donington Quadring & Gosberton (3 seats)
Party	Candidate	Votes	%	±%
Conservative	R. Clark*	1,219	54.3	
Conservative	A. Puttick*	1,111		
Independent	J. King	1,027	45.7	
Conservative	P. Espin*	937		
Turnout		4,294	40.4	
Conservative hold		Swing		
Conservative hold		Swing		
Independent gain from Conservative		Swing		

=== Fleet ===
Fleet (1 seat)
Party	Candidate	Votes	%	±%
Conservative	S. Keeble*	430	58.9	+10.2
Independent	D. Woolard	300	41.1	+10.9
Majority		130	17.8	−0.7
Turnout		730	41.8	+3.1
Conservative hold		Swing		

=== Gedney ===
Gedney (1 seat)
Party	Candidate	Votes	%	±%
Independent	S. Wilkinson	401	51.8	
Conservative	S. Marthews*	373	48.2	
Majority		28	3.6	
Turnout		774	40.8	+4.8
Independent gain from Conservative		Swing		

=== Holbeach Hurn ===
Holbeach Hurn (1 seat)
Party	Candidate	Votes	%	±%
Conservative	N. Worth	Uncontested		
Conservative hold		Swing		

=== Holbeach Town ===
Holbeach Town (3 seats)
Party	Candidate	Votes	%	±%
Conservative	F. Biggadike*	1,186	54.1	
Independent	M. Howard	1,008	45.9	
Conservative	R. Rudkin	870		
Conservative	V. Lawson	802		
Independent	H. Huett	735		
Turnout		4,601	36.7	−1.9
Conservative hold		Swing		
Independent gain from Conservative		Swing		
Conservative hold		Swing		

=== Long Sutton ===
Long Sutton (3 seats)
Party	Candidate	Votes	%	±%
Independent	D. Tennant*	1,658	59.0	
Independent	D. Wilkinson	1,369		
Independent	S. Booth	1,220		
Conservative	J. Tyrell	1,152	41.0	
Conservative	N. Baker	569		
Turnout		5,968	42.5	+4.5
Independent hold		Swing		
Independent hold		Swing		
Independent hold		Swing		

=== Moulton Weston & Cowbit ===
Moulton Weston & Cowbit (3 seats)
Party	Candidate	Votes	%	±%
Conservative	A. Casson*	1,419	47.5	
Conservative	A. Woolf*	1,184		
Conservative	R. Grocock	970		
Independent	P. Winn	759	25.4	
UKIP	R. Fairman	496	16.6	
Liberal Democrats	N. Hancocks	315	10.5	
Liberal Democrats	A. Ramkaran	208		
Turnout		5,351	44.7	+4.1
Conservative hold		Swing		
Conservative hold		Swing		
Conservative hold		Swing		

=== Pinchbeck & Surfleet ===
Pinchbeck & Surfleet (3 seats)
Party	Candidate	Votes	%	±%
Conservative	E. Sneath	1,273	63.5	
Conservative	J. Avery*	1,183		
Conservative	S. Slade	967		
Independent	D. Turp	731	36.5	
Independent	L. Tetherton	633		
Turnout		4,787	41.0	+5.5
Conservative hold		Swing		
Conservative gain from Independent		Swing		
Conservative gain from Independent		Swing		

=== Spalding Castle ===
Spalding Castle (1 seat)
Party	Candidate	Votes	%	±%
Conservative	G. Taylor	475	64.0	−4.2
Independent	J. Johnson	134	18.1	
Green	M. Blake	133	17.9	
Majority		341	45.9	−4.7
Turnout		742	40.7	+2.6
Conservative hold		Swing		

=== Spalding Monks House ===
Spalding Monks House (2 seats)
Party	Candidate	Votes	%	±%
Independent	A Newton*	955	46.5	−1.1
Conservative	G. Aley	697	33.9	+1.0
Labour	R. Sadd	402	19.6	+0.1
Turnout		2,054	37.2	+3.3
Independent hold		Swing		
Conservative hold		Swing		

=== Spalding St. Johns ===
Spalding St. Johns (2 seats)
Party	Candidate	Votes	%	±%
Independent	K. Dark	837	63.8	
Independent	R. Perkins	619		
Conservative	H. Drury	475	36.2	
Conservative	J. Scarlett	452		
Turnout		2,383	31.8	+3.8
Independent hold		Swing		
Independent gain from Conservative		Swing		

=== Spalding St. Marys ===
Spalding St. Marys (2 seats)
Party	Candidate	Votes	%	±%
Conservative	H. Johnson*	789	61.0	−2.8
Conservative	G. Porter*	674		
Independent	R. West	505	39.0	+2.8
Turnout		1,968	33.6	+6.8
Conservative hold		Swing		
Conservative hold		Swing		

=== Spalding St. Pauls ===
Spalding St. Pauls (2 seats)
Party	Candidate	Votes	%	±%
Conservative	D. Ashby	542	45.5	
Conservative	A. Miller	492		
Independent	G. Swallow	428	36.0	
BNP	M. Flaxman-Binns	220	18.5	
Turnout		1,682	29.1	+7.6
Conservative hold		Swing		
Conservative hold		Swing		

=== Spalding Wygate ===
Spalding Wygate (2 seats)
Party	Candidate	Votes	%	±%
Conservative	R. Gambba-Jones*	867	67.1	
Conservative	C. Lawton	767		
Independent	J. Godfry	425	32.9	
Turnout		2,059	37.2	+0.5
Conservative hold		Swing		
Conservative hold		Swing		

=== Sutton Bridge ===
Sutton Bridge (2 seats)
Party	Candidate	Votes	%	±%
Lincolnshire Independent	C. Brewis*	827	40.4	
Independent	M. Booth*	779	38.0	
Conservative	T. Rowe	442	21.6	
Turnout		2,048	36.4	−3.2
Lincolnshire Independent gain from Independent		Swing		
Independent hold		Swing		

Brewis was previously elected as an Independent councillor.

=== The Saints ===
The Saints (1 seat)
Party	Candidate	Votes	%	±%
Conservative	M. Seymour*	Unopposed		
Conservative hold		Swing		

=== Whaplode & Holbeach St. Johns ===
Whaplode & Holbeach St. Johns (2 seats)
Party	Candidate	Votes	%	±%
Conservative	R. Creese*	849	62.6	
Conservative	M. Chandler*	727		
Independent	M. Pullen	507	37.4	
Turnout		2,083	39.6	+1.7
Conservative hold		Swing		
Conservative hold		Swing		

Creese was previously elected as an Independent councillor.
