= 2011 Waveney District Council election =

2011 UK local government election

Map of the results

The 2011 elections to Waveney District Council took place on Thursday 5 May. This was the first election held as a whole council election following a change made to the electoral system in 2010. As a result, all 48 council seats were contested.

Before the election the Conservative Party had an overall majority on the council with 25 councillors. The Labour Party had 15 councillors, Liberal Democrats two, the Green Party one and there were three Independent councillors and two vacant seats. As a result of the election the Conservative Party lost overall control, with both it and the Labour Party represented by 23 councillors, the balance of the council being made up of one Green Party and one Independent councillor. A series of procedural moves led to the formation of a Conservative-led administration.

== Election result ==
Waveney District Council election, 2011
Party	Seats	Gains	Losses	Net gain/loss	Seats %	Votes %	Votes	+/−
Conservative	23	2 ^{[1]}	4	-2				
Labour	23	8	0	+8				
Liberal Democrats	0	0	2	-2				
Green	1	0	0	0				
UKIP	0	0	0	0				
Independent	1	0	2	-2				

^{[1]} The two Conservative gains were the vacant seats in Oulton Broad and Southwold and Reydon. Both had been won by the party in 2008.
