= 2011 Hart District Council election =

2011 UK local government election

← 2010	5 May 2011	2012 →

12 of 35 seats to Hart District Council 18 seats needed for a majority
	First party	Second party	Third party
Party	Conservative	Liberal Democrats	CCH
Seats before	20	10	5
Seats won	5	5	2
Seats after	20	10	5
Seat change	Steady	Steady	Steady
Popular vote	11,349	5,856	2,454
Percentage	51.3%	26.5%	11.1%
- Results by Ward
Council control before election
Conservative
Council control after election
Conservative

The 2011 Hart District council election took place on 5 May 2011, with one third of the seats up for election. The Conservatives, Liberal Democrats and Community Campaign (Hart) held all seats up for election, meaning that the council composition was the same after the election as it had been before.

== Ward results ==
=== Blackwater and Hawley ===
Blackwater and Hawley
Party	Candidate	Votes	%	±%
Liberal Democrats	Adrian Collett	859	59.0	
Conservative	Vivienne Gascoigne	596	41.0	
Majority		263		
Turnout		1,455		
Liberal Democrats hold		Swing		

=== Church Crookham West ===
Church Crookham West
Party	Candidate	Votes	%	±%
CCH	Jenny Radley	1,468	76.5	
Conservative	Akmal Gani	450	23.5	
Majority		1,018		
Turnout		1,918		
CCH hold		Swing		

=== Eversley ===
Eversley
Party	Candidate	Votes	%	±%
Conservative	Anne Crampton	556	54.4	
Independent	Christopher Abbott	272	26.6	
Independent	Shawn Dickens	195	19.1	
Majority		284		
Turnout		1,023		
Conservative hold		Swing		

=== Fleet Courtmoor ===
Fleet Courtmoor
Party	Candidate	Votes	%	±%
CCH	Chris Axam	986	49.6	
Conservative	Steve Forster	691	9.3	
Independent	Steve Lines	184	9.3	
Labour	Ruth Williams	127	6.4	
Majority		295		
Turnout		1,988		
CCH hold		Swing		

=== Fleet North ===
Fleet North
Party	Candidate	Votes	%	±%
Conservative	Anthony Barrell	1,397	64.9	
Liberal Democrats	Mariken van Dolen	452	21.0	
Labour	Satdeep Kaur Grewal	305	14.2	
Majority		945		
Turnout		2,154		
Conservative hold		Swing		

=== Frogmore and Darby Green ===
Frogmore and Darby Green
Party	Candidate	Votes	%	±%
Liberal Democrats	Kulwant Lit	758	45.9	
Conservative	Juliet Bowell	624	37.7	
Labour	John Davies	271	16.4	
Majority		134		
Turnout		1,653		
Liberal Democrats hold		Swing		

=== Hartley Wintney ===
Hartley Wintney
Party	Candidate	Votes	%	±%
Conservative	Sara-Lea Linnell	1,364	71.3	
Liberal Democrats	Andy Whitaker	350	18.3	
Labour	Colin Broadley	198	10.4	
Majority		1,014		
Turnout		1,912		
Conservative hold		Swing		

=== Hook ===
Hook
Party	Candidate	Votes	%	±%
Conservative	Brian Burchfield	2,035	70.3	
Labour	Verd Nabbs	457	15.8	
Liberal Democrats	Roger Newman	401	13.9	
Majority		1,578		
Turnout		2,893		
Conservative hold		Swing		

=== Odiham ===
Odiham
Party	Candidate	Votes	%	±%
Conservative	Ken Crookes	1,417	75.7	
Liberal Democrats	Tony Over	456	24.3	
Majority		961		
Turnout		1,873		
Conservative hold		Swing		

=== Yateley East ===
Yateley East
Party	Candidate	Votes	%	±%
Liberal Democrats	Graham Cockarill	846	48.0	
Conservative	Edward Bromhead	717	40.7	
Labour	Margaret Broadley	198	11.2	
Majority		129		
Turnout		1,761		
Liberal Democrats hold		Swing		

=== Yateley North ===
Yateley North
Party	Candidate	Votes	%	±%
Liberal Democrats	David Neighbour	901	52.7	
Conservative	Laura Blakey	810	47.3	
Majority		91		
Turnout		1,711		
Liberal Democrats hold		Swing		

=== Yateley West ===
Yateley West
Party	Candidate	Votes	%	±%
Liberal Democrats	Myra Billings	833	46.6	
Conservative	Owen Price	692	38.7	
Labour	Joyce Still	261	14.6	
Majority		141		
Turnout		1,786		
Liberal Democrats hold		Swing		
