= 2015 Chiltern District Council election =

2015 UK local government election

Map of the results

The 2015 Chiltern District Council election took place on 7 May 2015 to elect members to all seats of the Chiltern District Council in England, as part of the United Kingdom's local elections that year.

== Party Strength ==
As of 23 March 2018, the council's composition was as follows:

Party	Number of councillors
Conservatives	38
Liberal Democrats	2

=== By-elections ===
The single-member Ridgeway ward was vacated at the death of long-standing independent Councillor Derek Lacey. The consequent by-election on 22 March 2018 was won by Conservative candidate Nick Southworth.
