= 2011 Newark and Sherwood District Council election =

2011 UK local government election

Results of the 2011 Newark and Sherwood District Council election

The 2011 Newark and Sherwood District Council election took place on 5 May 2011 to elect members of Newark & Sherwood District Council in Nottinghamshire, England. The whole council was up for election. At the time of the 2011 Census the Local Authority had a population of, 114,817.

== Overall election results ==
=== Newark and Sherwood District Council (summary of overall results) ===
Newark and Sherwood District 2011 election results
Party	Seats	Gains	Losses	Net gain/loss	Seats %	Votes %	Votes	+/−
Conservative	22							
Labour	15							
Independent	6							
Liberal Democrats	3							

== Newark and Sherwood District Council - results by ward ==
=== Balderton North ===
Balderton North (2 seats)
Party	Candidate	Votes	%
Conservative	Neil Richard Allsopp (E)	727	26.8
Conservative	Jason Louis Osbourne (E)	621	22.9
Labour	Andy Freeman	450	16.6
Independent	Walter Hurst	430	15.9
Liberal Democrats	Neil Allen	206	7.6
Independent	David Michael Nixon	146	5.4
Liberal Democrats	John Page	131	4.8

=== Balderton West ===
Balderton West (2 seats)
Party	Candidate	Votes	%
Conservative	Betty Margaret Brooks (E)	736	36.2
Conservative	Gordon Brooks (E)	719	35.7
Labour	Raymond Arthur Rouse	581	28.5

=== Beacon ===
Beacon (3 seats)
Party	Candidate	Votes	%
Conservative	David James Lloyd (E)	818	16.2
Conservative	Peter Courtney Duncan (E)	746	14.8
Conservative	Marika Tribe (E)	736	14.6
Labour	Clive Ian Wetton	617	12.3
Labour	Peter Jones	603	12.0
Independent	Bryan Richardson	536	10.6
Independent	Kevin Thomas Clayton	472	9.4
Liberal Democrats	Chris Adams	285	5.7
Liberal Democrats	Robert John Foulger	225	4.5

=== Blidworth ===
Blidworth (2 seats)
Party	Candidate	Votes	%
Labour	Yvonne Woodhead (E)	652	36.0
Independent	Geoff Merry (E)	595	32.9
Labour	Hayley Warren	562	31.1

=== Boughton ===
Boughton (2 seats)
Party	Candidate	Votes	%
Labour	Linda Ann Shilling (E)	660	30.7
Labour	David Staples (E)	615	28.6
Conservative	Tim Wildgust	476	22.1
Independent	Dean Guy Milo Nixon	400	18.6

=== Bridge ===
Bridge (2 seats)
Party	Candidate	Votes	%
Independent	Gill Dawn (E)	573	29.6
Independent	Irene Brown (E)	519	26.9
Conservative	Stuart Graham	310	16.0
Conservative	Dean John Hyde	280	14.5
Labour	Graeme Lake	251	13.0

=== Castle ===
Castle (2 seats)
Party	Candidate	Votes	%
Independent	Tom Bickley (E)	862	42.7
Conservative	David Richard Payne (E)	591	29.3
Conservative	Max Cope	565	28.0

=== Caunton ===
Caunton (1 seat)
Party	Candidate	Votes	%
Conservative	Sylvia Mary Michael (E)	713	70.4
Labour	Dick Empson	196	19.4
Liberal Democrats	John Toy	121	12.0

=== Clipstone ===
Clipstone (2 seats)
Party	Candidate	Votes	%
Labour	Sheila Soar (E)	643	36.3
Labour	Dave Thompson (E)	591	33.3
Independent	Steve Parkhouse	539	30.4

=== Collingham and Meering ===
Collingham and Meering (2 seats)
Party	Candidate	Votes	%
Conservative	Kevin Rontree (E)	1,095	39.6
Conservative	Mel Shaw (E)	1,092	39.5
Liberal Democrats	Marylyn Rayner	579	20.9

=== Devon ===
Devon (2 seats)
Party	Candidate	Votes	%
Labour	Dennis Jones (E)	478	21.3
Labour	Trish Gurney (E)	459	20.4
Conservative	Keith Frank Girling	405	18.0
Conservative	Stuart Robert Wallace	385	17.1
Independent	Laurence Goff	270	12.0
Independent	Jerry McGarrigle	250	11.1

=== Edwinstowe ===
Edwinstowe (2 seats)
Party	Candidate	Votes	%
Labour	Celia Brooks (E)	1,023	27.9
Labour	John Malcolm Peck (E)	1,010	27.6
Conservative	Brian William Jarvis	573	15.6
Independent	Keith Benison	559	15.3
Independent	Les Ward	499	13.6
Turnout			

=== Farndon ===
Farndon (2 seats)
Party	Candidate	Votes	%
Conservative	Ivor Walker (E)	1,023	32.4
Independent	Declan Patrick Logue (E)	866	27.5
Conservative	Neill Bernard Mison	769	24.3
Liberal Democrats	Jim Gould	497	17.6
Turnout			

=== Farnsfield and Bilsthorpe ===
Farnsfield and Bilsthorpe (3 seats)
Party	Candidate	Votes	%
Conservative	Nora Anne Armstrong (E)	1,752	20.3
Conservative	Bruce Laughton (E)	1,698	19.7
Conservative	Robert Bradbury (E)	1,619	18.8
Labour	Kevin Cocker	1,234	14.3
Labour	Glenn Bardill	1,181	13.7
Labour	Arthur Fell	1,142	13.2
Turnout			

=== Lowdham ===
Lowdham (2 seats)
Party	Candidate	Votes	%
Conservative	Roger James Jackson (E)	Elected unopposed	n/a
Conservative	Keith William Sheppard (E)	Elected unopposed	n/a

=== Magnus ===
Magnus (2 seats)
Party	Candidate	Votes	%
Conservative	Rita Crowe (E)	513	22.0
Conservative	Tony Roberts (E)	475	20.4
Labour	Jean Moore	418	17.9
Labour	Douglas Michael Hough	365	15.7
Independent	Paul Baggaley	310	13.3
Independent	Sue Murphy	154	6.6
Liberal Democrats	Anne Holmes	95	4.1
Turnout			

=== Muskham ===
Muskham (1 seat)
Party	Candidate	Votes	%
Conservative	Sue Saddington (E)	Elected unopposed	n/a

=== Ollerton ===
Ollerton (3 seats)
Party	Candidate	Votes	%
Labour	Abbie Ann Truswell (E)	1,056	22.2
Labour	Stan Crawford (E)	997	20.9
Labour	Benjamin Wells (E)	906	19.0
Conservative	Mary Brown	562	11.8
Independent	Brian Smith	467	9.8
Conservative	Margaret Pettitt	464	9.7
Independent	Moritz Leslie Dawkins	312	6.6
Turnout			

=== Rainworth ===
Rainworth (3 seats)
Party	Candidate	Votes	%
Labour	Linda Tift (E)	1,080	23.7
Labour	John Bradbury (E)	819	17.9
Labour	John Middleton (E)	806	17.7
Independent	Mark Jefferies	678	14.9
Independent	Mark Buttery	648	14.2
Conservative	Robert Johnston	536	11.7
Turnout			

=== Southwell East ===
Southwell East (1 seat)
Party	Candidate	Votes	%
Liberal Democrats	Julian Edward Hamilton (E)	577	48.8
Conservative	Michael John Jeffrey	423	35.8
Labour	Jason Ferguson	182	15.4
Turnout			

=== Southwell North ===
Southwell North (1 seat)
Party	Candidate	Votes	%
Conservative	Paul Handley (E)	374	31.0
Independent	Andrew Phillip Gregory	354	29.3
Liberal Democrats	Brian Smith	350	29.0
Labour	Paul Sweeney	129	10.7
Turnout			

=== Southwell West ===
Southwell West (1 seat)
Party	Candidate	Votes	%
Liberal Democrats	Peter Harris (E)	678	53.6
Conservative	Mary Pay	481	38.0
Labour	Ray Shilling	106	8.4
Turnout			

=== Sutton-on-Trent ===
Sutton-on-Trent (1 seat)
Party	Candidate	Votes	%
Liberal Democrats	Christine Rose (E)	637	57.4
Conservative	James Fountain	377	34.0
Independent	Jean Clark	96	8.7
Turnout			

=== Trent ===
Trent (1 seat)
Party	Candidate	Votes	%
Conservative	Roger Vaughan Blaney (E)	899	75.2
Liberal Democrats	Lyn Harris	297	24.8
Turnout			

=== Winthorpe ===
Winthorpe (1 seat)
Party	Candidate	Votes	%
Independent	Maureen Dobson (E)	677	63.6
Conservative	Chris Gangel	387	36.4
Turnout			

== By-elections between May 2011 - May 2015 ==
By-elections are called when a representative councillor resigns or dies, so are unpredictable. A by-election is held to fill a political office that has become vacant between the scheduled elections.

=== Lowdham - 12 April 2012 ===
Lowdham by-election 12th April 2012
Party	Candidate	Votes	%	±%
Conservative	Tim Wendels (E)	787	51.5	+51.5
Liberal Democrats	William Davison	534	34.9	+34.9
Labour	Daniel Hibberd	117	7.7	+7.7
Independent	Tim Cutler	91	6.0	+6.0
Majority				
Turnout				
Conservative hold		Swing		

=== Collingham and Meering - 2 May 2013 ===
Collingham and Meering by-election 2nd May 2013
Party	Candidate	Votes	%	±%
Conservative	Derek Evans (E)	1112	74.7	−4.4
Labour	Daniel Hibberd	370	25.3	+4.4
Majority				
Turnout				
Conservative hold		Swing		

=== Farnsfield and Bilsthorpe - 27 June 2013 ===
Farnsfield and Bilsthorpe 27th June 2013
Party	Candidate	Votes	%	±%
Conservative	Frank Taylor (E)	1174	63.3	+4.5
Labour	Glenn Bardill	682	36.7	−4.5
Majority				
Turnout				
Conservative hold		Swing		

=== Collingham and Meering - 11 September 2014 ===
Collingham and Meering by-election 11th September 2014
Party	Candidate	Votes	%	±%
Conservative	Richard Shillito	568	41.2	−33.5
Independent	David John Clarke	476	34.5	+34.5
UKIP	Sara Chadd	218	15.8	+15.8
Labour	Kieran Roberts Owen	118	8.6	−16.7
Majority				
Turnout				
Conservative hold		Swing		

=== Ollerton - 11 September 2014 ===
Ollerton by-election 11th September 2014
Party	Candidate	Votes	%	±%
Labour	Michael Pringle (E)	837	58.1	−4.0
Conservative	Mary Brown	323	22.4	+0.9
UKIP	Moritz Dawkins	280	19.4	+19.4
Majority				
Turnout				
Labour hold		Swing		
