= West Devon Borough Council elections =

Local government elections in Devon, England

West Devon Borough Council in Devon, England is elected every four years. Since the last boundary changes in 2015, 31 councillors have been elected from 18 wards.

== Summary results ==
Composition of the council
Year	Conservative	Labour	Liberal Democrats (Note: Includes totals for the predecessors of the Liberal Democrats, the Liberal Party and SDP (both of which participated in the Alliance).)	Green (Note: Includes totals for the predecessors of the Green Party of England and Wales, the Ecology Party and Green Party UK.)	UKIP	Independents & Others	Council control after election
Local government reorganisation; council established (30 seats)
1973	0	0	0	–	–	30	Independent
1976	6	0	0	0	–	24	Independent
New ward boundaries (30 seats)
1979	10	0	0	0	–	20	Independent
1983	12	0	1	0	–	17	Independent
1987	13	1	1	0	–	15	No overall control
1991	5	1	6	0	–	18	Independent
1995	0	1	15	0	0	14	No overall control
1999	8	0	8	0	0	14	No overall control
New ward boundaries (31 seats)
2003	12	0	8	0	1	10	No overall control
2007	14	0	7	0	0	10	No overall control
2011	19	0	3	0	0	9	Conservative
New ward boundaries (31 seats)
2015	21	0	0	0	0	10	Conservative
2019	16	0	1	2	0	12	Conservative
2023	11	1	4	5	0	10	No overall control

== Results maps ==
2003 results map

2007 results map

2011 results map

2015 results map

2019 results map

2023 results map

== By-election results ==
=== 1999–2003 ===
Okehampton By-Election 24 February 2000
Party	Candidate	Votes	%	±%
Conservative		unopposed		
Conservative gain from Independent		Swing		

Milton Ford By-Election 4 May 2000
Party	Candidate	Votes	%	±%
Conservative		248	52.3	+52.3
Liberal Democrats		226	47.7	+47.7
Majority		22	4.6	
Turnout		474	41.0	
Conservative gain from Independent		Swing		

Buckland Monachorum By-Election 7 June 2001
Party	Candidate	Votes	%	±%
Conservative		1,075	51.7	+10.6
Liberal Democrats		1,006	48.3	+25.2
Majority		69	3.4	
Turnout		2,081		
Conservative hold		Swing		

Lydford By-Election 11 July 2002
Party	Candidate	Votes	%	±%
Liberal Democrats		228	56.3	+11.6
Conservative		177	43.7	−11.6
Majority		51	12.6	
Turnout		405	36.0	
Liberal Democrats gain from Conservative		Swing		

=== 2003–2007 ===
Chagford By-Election 14 September 2006
Party	Candidate	Votes	%	±%
Independent	Robert Sampson	310	58.1	
Conservative	Thomas Wells	224	41.9	
Majority		86	16.2	
Turnout		534	46.0	
Independent hold		Swing		

=== 2007–2011 ===
Tavistock North By-Election 7 February 2008
Party	Candidate	Votes	%	±%
Liberal Democrats	Adam Bridgewater	812	59.3	+33.7
Conservative	David Whitcomb	425	31.0	+4.2
Green	Vanni Cook	133	9.7	−5.0
Majority		387	28.3	
Turnout		1,370	33.9	
Liberal Democrats gain from Conservative		Swing		

Tavistock South By-Election 10 December 2009
Party	Candidate	Votes	%	±%
Liberal Democrats	Kirstie Clish-Green	523	45.8	+33.5
Conservative	Susan Bailey	450	39.4	+13.6
Independent	Brian Trew	170	14.9	−47.1
Majority		73	6.4	
Turnout		1,143	33.9	
Liberal Democrats gain from Conservative		Swing		

=== 2011–2015 ===
Tavistock North By-Election 22 March 2012
Party	Candidate	Votes	%	±%
Independent	Jeff Moody	407	35.5	+35.5
Conservative	Colin Rogers	256	22.3	−10.6
Liberal Democrats	Adam Bridgewater	225	19.6	−3.2
Labour	Moira Brown	125	10.9	−6.2
UKIP	Daniel Worth	78	6.8	+6.8
Independent	Daniel Worth	57	5.0	+5.0
Majority		151	13.2	
Turnout		1,148		
Independent gain from Conservative		Swing		

Tavistock North By-Election 21 June 2012
Party	Candidate	Votes	%	±%
Conservative	John Sheldon	349	37.2	+4.3
Independent	Caroline Keane	206	22.0	+22.0
Labour	Moira Brown	196	20.9	+3.8
Liberal Democrats	Joyce Hillson	187	19.9	−2.9
Majority		143	15.2	
Turnout		938		
Conservative hold		Swing		

=== 2015–2019 ===
Bere Ferrers By-Election 4 May 2017
Party	Candidate	Votes	%	±%
Conservative	Brian Lamb	639	52.2	+27.9
Labour	Katherine Medhurst	421	34.4	+19.0
UKIP	David Pengelly	164	13.4	−4.6
Majority		218	17.8	
Turnout		1,224		
Conservative hold		Swing		

=== 2019–2023 ===
Bere Ferrers By-Election 18 November 2021
Party	Candidate	Votes	%	±%
Conservative	Angela Blackman	362	32.5	+2.5
Labour	Isabel Saxby	361	32.4	+12.1
Liberal Democrats	Graham Reed	216	19.4	−11.8
Green	Judy Maciejowska	176	15.8	+15.8
Majority		1	0.1	
Turnout		1,115		
Conservative gain from Liberal Democrats		Swing		

Tavistock North By-Election 17 February 2022
Party	Candidate	Votes	%	±%
Conservative	David Turnbull	379	39.3	+24.4
Liberal Democrats	Peter Squire	337	35.0	+16.3
Green	Susan Bamford	163	16.9	+16.9
Labour	Doug Smith	85	8.8	−9.3
Majority		42	4.4	
Turnout		964		
Conservative gain from Independent		Swing		

=== 2023–2027 ===
Tavistock North By-Election 22 June 2023
Party	Candidate	Votes	%	±%
Independent	Ursula Mann	233	25.5	
Liberal Democrats	Holly Greenbury-Pullen	233	25.5	
Green	Annabel Martin	215	23.5	
Conservative	Judy Hughes	176	19.3	
Labour	Uwem Udo	57	6.2	
Majority		0	0.0	
Turnout		914		
Independent gain from Green		Swing		

Ursula Mann was elected following the drawing of lots.

Tavistock North By-Election 2 May 2024
Party	Candidate	Votes	%	±%
Liberal Democrats	Holly Greenbury-Pullen	387	28.1	
Conservative	Judy Hughes	348	25.2	
Green	Sara Wood	289	21.0	
Labour	Uwem Udo	195	14.1	
Independent	Michael Fife Cook	160	11.6	
Majority		39	2.8	
Turnout		1,379		
Liberal Democrats hold		Swing		

Tavistock North By-Election 1 May 2025
Party	Candidate	Votes	%	±%
Liberal Democrats	Graham Reed	485	31.5	
Conservative	Judy Hughes	402	26.1	
Reform	Brian Trew	355	23.0	
Green	Sara Louise Wood	165	10.7	
Labour	Uwem Udo	155	10.1	
Majority		83	5.4	
Turnout		1,562	38.43	
Liberal Democrats gain from Independent		Swing		

Okehampton South By-Election 6 November 2025
Party	Candidate	Votes	%	±%
Liberal Democrats	Jan Goffey	356	57.1	
Conservative	Lois Samuel	152	24.4	
Independent	Julie Yelland	116	18.6	
Majority		204	32.7	
Turnout		624		
Liberal Democrats gain from Green		Swing		
