= Outline of England =

Country of the United Kingdom

Flag of England

Royal Banner of England

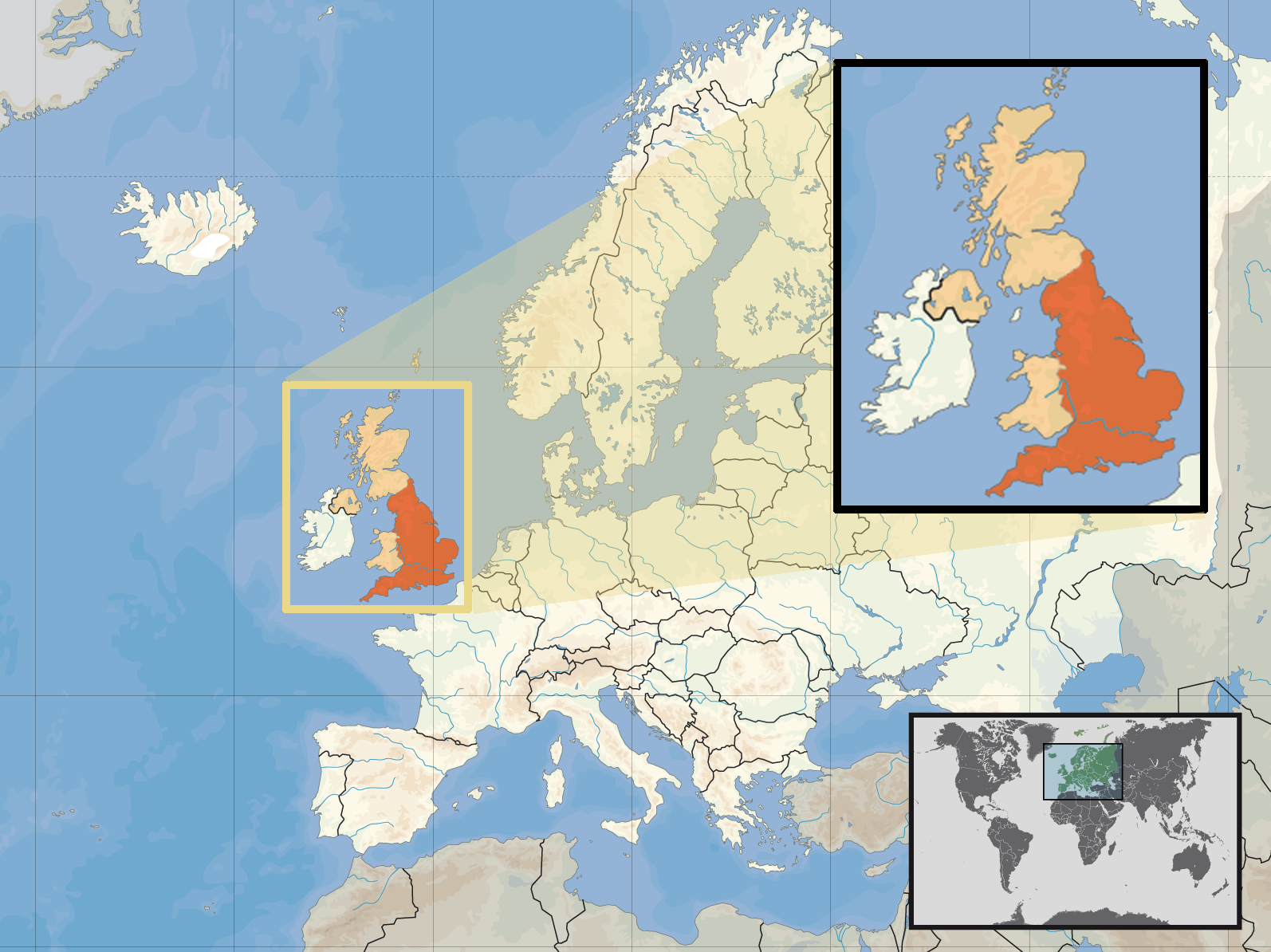
Location of England (orange)
– in the European continent (camel & white)
– in the United Kingdom (camel)

The following outline is provided as an overview of and topical guide to England:

England is a country that is part of the United Kingdom. It is located on the island of Great Britain, of which it covers about 62%, and more than 100 smaller adjacent islands. England shares a land border with Scotland to the north and another land border with Wales to the west, and is surrounded by the North Sea to the east, the English Channel to the south, the Celtic Sea to the south-west, and the Irish Sea to the west. Continental Europe lies to the south-east, and Ireland to the west. The population was 56,490,048 according to the 2021 census, with nine million inhabitants in its largest city, London.

== General reference ==
- Pronunciation: /ˈɪŋɡlənd/
- Etymology of "England"
- Common English country name(s): England
- Official English country name(s): England
- Common endonym(s): List of countries and capitals in native languages
- Official endonym(s): List of official endonyms of present-day nations and states
- Adjectival(s): English
- Demonym(s): English

== Geography of England ==
Geography of England

- England is: a constituent country of the United Kingdom. See Countries of the United Kingdom.
- Location
  - Atlantic Ocean
  - Northern Hemisphere, on the Prime Meridian
  - Eurasia (but not on the mainland)
    - Europe
      - Northern Europe and Western Europe
        - British Isles
          - Great Britain (the largest island of the British isles)
  - Extreme points of England
- Demographics of England:
- Area of England:
- Places in England
- Atlas of England

=== Environment of England ===
- Climate of England
- Geology of England
- National parks of England and Wales
- Fauna of England

==== Natural geographic features of England ====
- Estuaries in England
- Islands of England
- Lakes of England
- Mountains and hills of England
- Rivers of England
  - Waterfalls of England

=== Regions of England ===
- North East
  - North East
  - North of Tyne
  - Tees Valley
- North West
  - Greater Manchester
  - Liverpool City Region
- Yorkshire and The Humber
  - Sheffield City Region
  - Leeds City Region
- East Midlands
- West Midlands
  - West Midlands
- East of England
  - Cambridgeshire and Peterborough
- London
- South East
- South West
  - West of England

==== Administrative divisions of England ====
Administrative divisions of England

- Regions of England
  - Sub-Regions of England
    - Districts of England
      - Civil parishes in England
      - Municipalities of England
  - Unitary authorities of England

===== Counties of England =====
Counties of England

- Metropolitan and non-metropolitan counties of England

===== Districts of England =====
Districts of England

===== Civil parishes of England =====
- List of civil parishes in England

===== Unitary authorities of England =====
Unitary authorities of England

===== Municipalities of England =====
Municipalities of England

- Capital of England: Capital of England
- Cities in England
- Towns in England

=== Demography of England ===
Demographics of England

== Government and politics of England ==
Politics of England

- Form of government: none.
  - England is under the full jurisdiction of the Parliament of the United Kingdom of Great Britain and Northern Ireland and the UK government.
  - England is the only country of the UK that does not have its own (devolved) government.
- Capital of England: London
- Taxation in England
- West Lothian question

=== Law and order in England ===
English law

- Capital punishment in the United Kingdom: none
- Courts of England and Wales
  - List of courts in England and Wales
- Human rights in England: same as for the UK
  - Freedom of religion in England
  - LGBT rights in England: largely same as for other parts of UK
- Law enforcement in England
- Prison population of England and Wales
- Rights of way in England and Wales

=== Military of England ===
Military of England

- England does not have its own military. See British Armed Forces.
- Military history of England

=== Local government of England ===
Local government in England

== History of England ==
History of England

=== History of England by period ===
- Prehistoric Britain
- Roman Britain
- Anglo-Saxon England
- Kingdom of England
  - List of years in the Kingdom of England
  - Norman conquest of England
  - Anglo-Norman England
  - House of Plantagenet
    - House of Lancaster
    - House of York
  - House of Tudor
  - House of Stuart
    - Stuart Restoration
- The Protectorate
- Commonwealth of England
- Glorious Revolution
- Kingdom of Great Britain
- United Kingdom of Great Britain and Ireland
- United Kingdom of Great Britain and Northern Ireland

=== History of England, by region ===
==== History of cities of England ====
- History of Birmingham
- History of Bristol
- History of Chester
- History of Coventry
- History of Durham
- History of Leeds
- History of Liverpool
- History of London
- History of Manchester
- History of Margate
- History of Newcastle upon Tyne
- History of Nottingham
- History of Sheffield
- History of York

==== History of counties of England ====
- History of Bedfordshire
- History of Berkshire
- History of Buckinghamshire
- History of Cambridgeshire
- History of Cheshire
- History of Cleveland
- History of Cornwall
- History of Cumberland
- History of Cumbria
- History of Derbyshire
- History of Devon
- History of Dorset
- History of Durham
- History of East Suffolk
- History of East Sussex
- History of Essex
- History of Gloucestershire
- History of Greater London
- History of Greater Manchester
- History of Hampshire
- History of Hereford and Worcester
- History of Herefordshire
- History of Hertfordshire
- History of Humberside
- History of Huntingdon and Peterborough
- History of Huntingdonshire
- History of the Isle of Ely
- History of the Isle of Wight
- History of Kent
- History of Lancashire
- History of Leicestershire
- History of Lincolnshire
- History of Merseyside
- History of Middlesex
- History of Norfolk
- History of Northamptonshire
- History of Northumberland
- History of North Humberside
- History of North Yorkshire
- History of Nottinghamshire
- History of Oxfordshire
- History of Soke of Peterborough
- History of Rutland
- History of Shropshire
- History of Somerset
- History of South Humberside
- History of South Yorkshire
- History of Staffordshire
- History of Suffolk
- History of Surrey
- History of Sussex
- History of Tyne and Wear
- History of Warwickshire
- History of West Midlands
- History of Westmorland
- History of West Suffolk
- History of West Sussex
- History of West Yorkshire
- History of Wiltshire
- History of Worcestershire
- History of Yorkshire
- History of Yorkshire, East Riding
- History of Yorkshire, North Riding
- History of Yorkshire, West Riding

=== History of England, by subject ===
- British Invasion
- History of the Church of England
- History of education in England
- History of the Jews in England
- History of local government in England
- Military history of England
  - Battles between Scotland and England
  - Wars involving England and France
- Parliament of England
- Peerage of England

== Culture of England ==
Culture of England

- Architecture of England
  - Architecture of the medieval cathedrals of England
    - Cathedrals in England
  - Castles in England
  - Hill forts in England
  - Historic houses in England
  - National Trust properties in England
- Cuisine of England
- Cultural icons of England
- Ethnic minorities in England
- Gardens in England
- Festivals in England
- British humour
- English inventions and discoveries
- Languages of England
- Marriage in England
  - Civil partnership in England
- Media in England
- Museums in England
- National symbols of England
  - Coat of arms of England
  - Flag of England
  - National anthem of England
- People of England
- Prostitution in the United Kingdom
- Public holidays in England
- Records of England
- Religion in England
  - Buddhism in England
  - Christianity in England
    - Church of England
    - Roman Catholicism in England and Wales
  - Hinduism in England
  - Islam in England
  - Judaism in England
  - Sikhism in England
- World Heritage Sites in England

=== Art of England ===
Art in England

- Cinema of England
- Comedy in England
- Literature of England
- Music of England
  - Bands from England
  - Folk music of England
- Television in England
- Theatre in England
  - Entertainment venues in London

=== Sport in England ===
Sports in England

- Chess in England
  - English Chess Federation
- Cricket in England
  - England cricket team
- Football in England
  - England national football team
  - The Football Association
  - FA Cup
  - The Football League
  - Premier League
- National sports teams of England
- Olympics and England - England does not compete at the Olympic Games, English athletes compete as part of the Great Britain team instead.
- Rugby in England
  - Rugby league in England
  - Rugby union in England
- Stadiums in England

== Economy and infrastructure of England ==
Economy of England

- Economic rank (by nominal GDP):
- Agriculture in England
- Banking in England
  - Bank of England (central bank of the UK)
- Communications in England
  - Internet in England
- Companies of England
  - List of award-winning pubs in London
  - List of companies based in London
  - List of pubs in London
  - List of restaurants in London
- Currency of the United Kingdom: Pound Sterling
- Economic history of England
- Energy in England
  - List of power stations in England
  - Oil industry in England
- Fire service in the United Kingdom § England
- Health care in England
  - History of the National Health Service
  - List of hospitals in England
- Mining in England
- Tourism in England
- Transport in England
  - List of airports in England
  - List of ports in England
  - Rail transport in England
  - Roads in England
  - National Cycle Network
- Water supply and sanitation in England

== Education in England ==
Education in England

- General Teaching Council for England
- National Curriculum for England

=== Types of schools in England ===
- Grammar schools in the United Kingdom
- Private school
- Preparatory school

=== Specific schools in England ===
- Public schools in England
  - Grammar schools in England
  - Middle schools in England
- Universities

== See also ==
England

- List of basic geography topics
- List of international rankings
- Outline of Northern Ireland
- Outline of Scotland
- Outline of the United Kingdom
- Outline of Wales
