= 2011 West Devon Borough Council election =

Local election in Devon, UK

Elections to West Devon Borough Council were held on 5 May 2011, alongside other local elections across the United Kingdom. All 31 seats on the council were up for election. Following the election the Conservative Party gained the council from no overall control.

Results of the 2011 West Devon Borough Council election

== Results summary ==
2011 West Devon District Council election
Party	Seats	Change
Conservative Party	19	▲7
Liberal Democrats	3	▼5
Others	9	▼2

== Results by ward (A-Z) ==
=== Bere Ferrers (2) ===
Bere Ferrers
Party	Candidate	Votes	%	±%
Conservative	Michael Benson	589	45.0	+9.0
Liberal Democrats	Charles Musgrave	486	37.1	−26.9
Conservative	Andrew Sadler	486		
Liberal Democrats	Joyce Bottse	432		
Labour	Joanne Agnew	235	17.9	N/A
Majority		N/A	7.9	−20.1
Turnout		2228	N/A	N/A
Conservative gain from Liberal Democrats		Swing	N/A	
Liberal Democrats hold		Swing	N/A	

On the final count, Charles Musgrave and Andrew Sadler drew on votes; Councillor Musgrave was eventually elected through a drawing of lots.

=== Bridestowe (1) ===
Bridestowe
Party	Candidate	Votes	%	±%
Independent	Lewis Hockridge	624	78.6	N/A
Labour	Alison Young	170	21.4	N/A
Majority		454	57.2	+14.4
Turnout		794	N/A	N/A
Independent hold		Swing	N/A	

=== Buckland Monachorum (2) ===
Buckland Monachorum
Party	Candidate	Votes	%	±%
Conservative	Philip Sanders *	Unopposed	N/A	N/A
Liberal Democrats	David Wilde	Unopposed	N/A	N/A
Majority		N/A	N/A	N/A
Turnout		N/A	N/A	N/A
Conservative hold		Swing	N/A	
Liberal Democrats gain from Independent		Swing	N/A	

=== Burrator (1) ===
Burrator
Party	Candidate	Votes	%	±%
Conservative	Diane Moyse *	395	56.3	+−0.0
Liberal Democrats	Ann Ellis	306	43.7	+−0.0
Majority		89	12.6	+−0.0
Turnout		701	N/A	N/A
Conservative hold		Swing	N/A	

=== Chagford (1) ===
Chagford
Party	Candidate	Votes	%	±%
Independent	Robert Sampson *	345	47.9	−18.8
Conservative	Nicola Heyworth	310	43.0	+9.7
Labour	Martin Young	66	9.2	N/A
Majority		35	4.9	−28.5
Turnout		721	N/A	N/A
Independent hold		Swing	N/A	

=== Drewsteignton (1) ===
Drewsteignton
Party	Candidate	Votes	%	±%
Conservative	Paul Rigders *	Unopposed	N/A	N/A
Majority		N/A	N/A	N/A
Turnout		N/A	N/A	N/A
Conservative hold		Swing	N/A	

=== Exbourne (1) ===
Exbourne
Party	Candidate	Votes	%	±%
Independent	Trevor Hill	404	52.1	N/A
Conservative	Anne Lucas	371	47.9	N/A
Majority		33	4.2	−65.6
Turnout		775	N/A	N/A
Independent hold		Swing	N/A	

=== Hatherleigh (1) ===
Hatherleigh
Party	Candidate	Votes	%	±%
Conservative	Christine Hall	312	35.1	N/A
Independent	Graham Alford	310	34.9	N/A
Liberal Democrats	Erica Entwistle	221	24.9	−4.5
Labour	Peter Brickley	46	5.2	N/A
Majority		2	0.2	−25.9
Turnout		889	N/A	N/A
Conservative gain from Independent		Swing	N/A	

=== Lew Valley (1) ===
Lew Valley
Party	Candidate	Votes	%	±%
Conservative	James McInnes *	666	77.2	+10.4
Liberal Democrats	Christopher Bones	197	22.8	+4.1
Majority		469	54.4	+6.3
Turnout		863	N/A	N/A
Conservative hold		Swing	N/A	

=== Lydford (1) ===
Lydford
Party	Candidate	Votes	%	±%
Conservative	Lynne Rose	343	56.6	+2.6
Liberal Democrats	David Rogers	263	43.4	−2.6
Majority		80	13.2	+5.2
Turnout		606	N/A	N/A
Conservative hold		Swing	N/A	

=== Mary Tavy (1) ===
Mary Tavy
Party	Candidate	Votes	%	±%
Independent	Terence Pearce *	554	64.5	N/A
Conservative	Tracey Oxborough	305	35.5	−22.8
Majority		249	29.0	−3.0
Turnout		859	N/A	N/A
Independent gain from Conservative		Swing	N/A	

Councillor Pearce was elected as a Conservative at the previous election in 2007, but sought re-election as an independent.

=== Milton Ford (1) ===
Milton Ford
Party	Candidate	Votes	%	±%
Conservative	Bob Baldwin	Unopposed	N/A	N/A
Majority		N/A	N/A	N/A
Turnout		N/A	N/A	N/A
Conservative hold		Swing	N/A	

=== North Tawton (1) ===
North Tawton
Party	Candidate	Votes	%	±%
Independent	Nicholas Morgan *	431	56.3	N/A
Conservative	John Lucas	335	43.7	N/A
Majority		96	12.6	N/A
Turnout		766	N/A	N/A
Independent hold		Swing	N/A	

=== Okehampton East (2) ===
Okehampton East
Party	Candidate	Votes	%	±%
Conservative	Kevin Ball	544	43.4	−3.3
Independent	Antony Leech	493	39.3	N/A
Conservative	Jayne Hill	464		
Independent	Edna Hicks *	365		
Labour	Terence Cummings	217	17.3	N/A
Majority		N/A	4.1	−2.2
Turnout		2083	N/A	N/A
Conservative hold		Swing	N/A	
Independent gain from Liberal Democrats		Swing	N/A	

Edna Hicks was elected as Liberal Democrat at the previous election in 2007, but sought re-election as an independent.

=== Okehampton West (2) ===
Okehampton West
Party	Candidate	Votes	%	±%
Conservative	Christine Marsh **	672	40.9	+2.3
Conservative	Michael Morse	524		
Independent	David Weekes	356	21.6	N/A
Liberal Democrats	John Young	344	20.9	−28.8
Labour	Malcolm Calder	273	16.6	N/A
Majority		N/A	19.3	+8.2
Turnout		2169	N/A	N/A
Conservative gain from Liberal Democrats		Swing	N/A	
Conservative gain from Liberal Democrats		Swing	N/A	

Councillor Marsh was elected as a Conservative for Okehampton East at the previous election in 2007, but sought re-election in Okehampton West.

=== South Tawton (1) ===
South Tawton
Party	Candidate	Votes	%	±%
Independent	William Cann *	643	85.1	+22.2
Labour	Janet Brickley	113	14.9	N/A
Majority		530	70.2	+43.3
Turnout		756	N/A	N/A
Independent hold		Swing	N/A	

=== Tamarside (1) ===
Tamarside
Party	Candidate	Votes	%	±%
Conservative	David Whitcomb	352	53.4	+6.6
Independent	John Sheldon	192	29.1	N/A
Liberal Democrats	Adrian Hepworth	115	17.5	N/A
Majority		160	24.3	+17.9
Turnout		659	N/A	N/A
Conservative gain from Independent		Swing	N/A	

=== Tavistock North (3) ===
Tavistock North
Party	Candidate	Votes	%	±%
Conservative	Susan Bailey	706	32.9	+6.1
Conservative	Darren Lake	592		
Conservative	Michael Harper	584		
Independent	Roy Connelly *	583	27.2	+6.7
Independent	Jeffrey Boyd Moody	576		
Liberal Democrats	Adam Bridgewater	490	22.8	−2.8
Liberal Democrats	Ann Keelan	406		
Independent	Edward Sanders	369		
Labour	Moira Brown	367	17.1	N/A
Liberal Democrats	Martin Taylor	248		
Majority		N/A	5.7	+4.5
Turnout		4921	N/A	N/A
Conservative hold		Swing	N/A	
Conservative gain from Liberal Democrats		Swing	N/A	
Conservative hold		Swing	N/A	

Roy Connelly was elected as a Liberal Democrat at the previous election in 2007, but sought re-election as an independent.

=== Tavistock South (3) ===
Tavistock South
Party	Candidate	Votes	%	±%
Independent	Edward Sherrell *	1,257	41.0	−10.0
Conservative	Mandy Govier *	857	27.9	−5.3
Conservative	Robert Oxborough	687		
Liberal Democrats	Kirstie Clish-Green	664	21.6	+5.8
Liberal Democrats	Helena Ancil	480		
Labour	Ian Gasper	291	9.5	N/A
Majority		N/A	13.1	−4.7
Turnout		4236	N/A	N/A
Independent hold		Swing	N/A	
Conservative hold		Swing	N/A	
Conservative hold		Swing	N/A	

=== Tavistock South West (1) ===
Tavistock South West
Party	Candidate	Votes	%	±%
Liberal Democrats	Kathleen Clish-Green	356	45.7	−19.2
Conservative	David Rose	301	38.6	+3.5
Labour	Michael Sparling	122	15.7	N/A
Majority		55	7.1	−22.7
Turnout		779	N/A	N/A
Liberal Democrats hold		Swing	N/A	

=== Thrushel (1) ===
Thrushel
Party	Candidate	Votes	%	±%
Conservative	Donald Horn *	477	70.9	+7.2
Liberal Democrats	Pamela Bones	196	29.1	N/A
Majority		281	41.8	+14.4
Turnout		673	N/A	N/A
Conservative hold		Swing	N/A	

=== Walkham (2) ===
Walkham
Party	Candidate	Votes	%	±%
Conservative	Deborah Sellis *	698	42.4	+13.6
Independent	David Cloke *	686	41.7	+4.4
Liberal Democrats	Michael Parle	261	15.9	−6.1
Liberal Democrats	Graham Turner	181		
Majority		N/A	0.7	−7.8
Turnout		1826	N/A	N/A
Conservative hold		Swing	N/A	
Independent hold		Swing	N/A	

== See also ==
- West Devon Borough Council elections
