= Nottingham University Samworth Academy =

Location
- Bramhall Road; Bilborough; Nottingham, Nottinghamshire, NG8 4HY; England
- Coordinates: 52.964°N 1.235°W

Information
- Type: Academy
- Trust: Nottingham University Samworth Academies Trust; Torch Academy Gateway Trust
- Department for Education URN: 135761 Tables
- Ofsted: Reports
- Gender: Coeducational
- Age: 11 to 18
- Website: http://www.nusa.org.uk/

Nottingham University Samworth Academy (formerly William Sharp School) is a coeducational secondary school and sixth form with academy status, located in the Bilborough area of Nottingham in the English county of Nottinghamshire.

== History ==
=== Bilateral school ===
Previously a community school administered by Nottingham City Council, William Sharp School, which began as a bilateral school in 1955 (it had a grammar stream).

William Sharp was the Lord Mayor of Nottingham in 1949.

=== Academy ===
It converted to academy status on 1 September 2009 and was renamed Nottingham University Samworth Academy. The school is sponsored by the University of Nottingham and businessman Sir David Samworth, and is supported by the Torch Academy Gateway Trust, a trust which oversees other Nottinghamshire schools, including Meden School and Toot Hill School. However, Nottingham University Samworth Academy continues to coordinate with Nottingham City Council for admissions.

== Admissions ==
Nottingham University Samworth Academy offers GCSEs and BTECs as programmes of study for pupils. The school operates a small vocational sixth form for work-related courses, and there is also a provision for pupils with special educational needs who are deaf.

== Notable former pupils ==
=== William Sharp Bilateral School ===
- Henry Normal, comedy writer and co-founder of Baby Cow Productions, and co-wrote The Royle Family
- Nigel Pearson, Manager from 2011 to 2015 of Leicester City, and defender in the 1980s for Sheffield Wednesday

== See also ==
- Education in Nottingham
