= 2019 West Devon Borough Council election =

2019 UK local government election

← 2015	2 May 2019	2023 →

All 31 seats to West Devon Borough Council 16 seats needed for a majority

	First party	Second party
Party	Conservative	Independent
Last election	21 seats, 44.6%	10 seats, 31.6%
Seats won	16	11
Seat change	▼5	▲1
Popular vote	9,340	7,566
Percentage	37.9%	30.7%
Swing	▼6.7%	▼0.9%
	Third party	Fourth party
Party	Green	Liberal Democrats
Last election	0 seats, 13.7%	0 seats, 2.1%
Seats won	2	2
Seat change	▲2	▲2
Popular vote	2,912	1,691
Percentage	11.8%	6.9%
Swing	▼1.9%	▲4.8%
- Results of the 2019 West Devon Borough Council election
Council control before election
Conservative
Council control after election
Conservative

The 2019 West Devon Borough Council election took place on 2 May 2019, to elect members of West Devon Borough Council in England. This was on the same day as other local elections across England.

== Result ==
=== Election result ===
2019 West Devon Borough Council election
Party	Candidates	Seats	Gains	Losses	Net gain/loss	Seats %	Votes %	Votes	+/−
Conservative	27	16	3	8	▼5	51.6	37.9	9,340	–6.7
Independent	12	11	7	6	▲1	35.5	30.7	7,566	–0.9
Green	8	2	2	0	▲2	6.5	11.8	2,912	–1.9
Liberal Democrats	7	2	2	0	▲2	6.5	6.9	1,691	+4.8
Labour	11	0	0	0	Steady	0.0	10.5	2,587	+4.5
UKIP	2	0	0	0	Steady	0.0	2.2	530	+0.2

== Results by Ward ==
=== Bere Ferrers ===
Bere Ferrers
Party	Candidate	Votes	%	±%
Liberal Democrats	Charles Robin Musgrave*	491	41.1	
Conservative	Peter Edward Crozier	473	39.6	
Labour	Katherine Rose Medhurst	320	26.8	
UKIP	David Pengelly	291	24.4	
Liberal Democrats	Graham Richard Reed	258	21.6	
Labour	David John Whitworth	149	12.5	
Turnout		1,206	40.61	
Liberal Democrats gain from Independent		Swing		
Conservative hold		Swing		

Robin Musgrave was the winning Independent candidate in 2015.

=== Bridestowe ===
Bridestowe
Party	Candidate	Votes	%	±%
Conservative	Caroline Mott*	600	62.8	
Conservative	Terence John Southcott	538	56.3	
Liberal Democrats	Pamela Gail Bones	301	31.5	
Labour	Malcolm David John Light	194	20.3	
Turnout		990	39.60	
Conservative hold		Swing		
Conservative gain from Independent		Swing		

=== Buckland Monachorum ===
Buckland Monachorum
Party	Candidate	Votes	%	±%
Independent	Richard Frank Cheadle*	789	59.4	
Green	Lucy Jane Wood	587	44.2	
Conservative	Philip Richard Sanders*	457	34.4	
Liberal Democrats	Patricia Anne Reid	229	17.2	
Labour	Anthony Parker Marchese	151	11.4	
Turnout		1,344	45.51	
Independent hold		Swing		
Green gain from Conservative		Swing		

=== Burrator ===
Burrator
Party	Candidate	Votes	%	±%
Liberal Democrats	Tim Bolton	Unopposed	N/A	N/A
Conservative	Diana Elizabeth Moyse*	Unopposed	N/A	N/A
Turnout		N/A	N/A	
Liberal Democrats gain from Independent		Swing		
Conservative hold		Swing		

=== Chagford ===
Chagford
Party	Candidate	Votes	%	±%
Conservative	Nicola Mary Heyworth	299	51.5	+19.0
Green	David John Osbiston	282	48.5	+26.6
Turnout		593	50.43	
Conservative gain from Independent		Swing		

=== Dartmoor ===
Dartmoor
Party	Candidate	Votes	%	±%
Independent	Mark Christian Renders	484	79.1	N/A
Conservative	Stephen Earp	128	20.9	−40.4
Turnout		615	44.09	
Independent gain from Conservative		Swing		

=== Drewsteignton ===
Drewsteignton
Party	Candidate	Votes	%	±%
Conservative	Paul James Ridgers*	315	51.4	−14.2
Green	Lisa Anne Rowe	236	38.5	+4.1
Labour	Paula Louise Frisby	62	10.1	N/A
Turnout		620	44.99	
Conservative hold		Swing		

=== Exbourne ===
Exbourne
Party	Candidate	Votes	%	±%
Conservative	Lois Esther Samuel*	579	54.2	
Conservative	Barry Ian Ratcliffe	537	50.2	
Green	Hugh Jonathan Norman	433	40.5	
Labour	Peter Frank Brickley	280	26.2	
Turnout		1,102	35.00	
Conservative hold		Swing		
Conservative hold		Swing		

=== Hatherleigh ===
Hatherleigh
Party	Candidate	Votes	%	±%
Conservative	Clare Mary Gerardine Kemp	Unopposed	N/A	N/A
Conservative	Patrick John Derek Kimber*	Unopposed	N/A	N/A
Turnout		N/A	N/A	
Conservative hold		Swing		
Conservative hold		Swing		

=== Mary Tavy ===
Mary Tavy
Party	Candidate	Votes	%	±%
Independent	Terence George Pearce*	399	57.0	−12.5
Conservative	Annabel Roberts	249	35.6	N/A
Independent	Michael Arthur Fife Cook	52	7.4	−23.1
Turnout		703	54.29	
Independent hold		Swing		

=== Milton Ford ===
Milton Ford
Party	Candidate	Votes	%	±%
Conservative	Neil Jory*	339	66.9	+5.6
Labour	David Munnelly	168	33.1	N/A
Turnout		535	37.05	
Conservative hold		Swing		

Neil Jory was an incumbent councillor for Tavistock North ward.

=== Okehampton North ===
Okehampton North
Party	Candidate	Votes	%	±%
Independent	Antony Frank Leech*	902	62.7	
Conservative	Michael Bryn Davies*	615	42.8	
Conservative	Kevin Ball*	593	41.2	
Independent	Michael John Ireland	582	40.5	
Labour	Elaine Marie Whitefoot	463	32.2	
Conservative	Teresa Dawn Edwards	430	29.9	
Turnout		1,448	35.68	
Independent hold		Swing		
Conservative hold		Swing		
Conservative hold		Swing		

=== Okehampton South ===
Okehampton South
Party	Candidate	Votes	%	±%
Independent	Paul Richard Vachon	424	47.9	
Conservative	Julie Veronica Yelland*	335	37.8	
Green	Malcolm William Calder	320	36.1	
UKIP	Robert Michael Rush	239	27.0	
Conservative	Simon Christopher Thomas	232	26.2	
Turnout		893	31.14	
Independent gain from Conservative		Swing		
Conservative hold		Swing		

=== South Tawton ===
South Tawton
Party	Candidate	Votes	%	±%
Green	Lynn Christine Daniel	434	61.2	+40.6
Conservative	Louise Sacha Watts*	275	38.8	+12.3
Turnout		720	46.07	
Green gain from Independent		Swing		

Louise Watts was an incumbent councillor for the Exbourne ward.

=== Tamarside ===
Tamarside
Party	Candidate	Votes	%	±%
Conservative	Christopher Neville Edmonds*	403	73.4	+11.8
Liberal Democrats	Christopher John Bones	74	13.5	N/A
Labour	Zoe Lorraine Waite	72	13.1	N/A
Turnout		559	39.84	
Conservative gain from Independent		Swing		

Chris Edmonds was the winning Independent candidate in 2015. The change in his share of the vote is shown from his result in 2015, rather than the Conservative candidate's.

=== Tavistock North ===
Tavistock North
Party	Candidate	Votes	%	±%
Independent	Jeffrey Boyd-Moody*	870	60.8	
Independent	Andrew John Coulson	717	50.1	
Independent	Stephen Jon Hipsey	695	48.6	
Liberal Democrats	Peter Cyril Squire	338	23.6	
Labour	Lesley Ann Crawford	326	22.8	
Conservative	John Sheldon*	269	18.8	
Conservative	Jack Daniel Kevin Morewood	263	18.4	
Turnout		1,435	38.86	
Independent hold		Swing		
Independent gain from Conservative		Swing		
Independent gain from Conservative		Swing		

=== Tavistock South East ===
Tavistock South East
Party	Candidate	Votes	%	±%
Independent	James Spettigue	665	50.0	
Conservative	Deborah Katherine Anne Sellis*	663	49.8	
Conservative	Robert John Oxborough*	415	31.2	
Green	Sara Alison Palmer	386	29.0	
Labour	Stephen James Cox	223	16.8	
Turnout		1,339	45.76	
Independent gain from Conservative		Swing		
Conservative hold		Swing		

=== Tavistock South West ===
Tavistock South West
Party	Candidate	Votes	%	±%
Independent	Mandy Victoria Louise Ewings	504	52.1	
Independent	Adam Duncan Bridgewater	483	49.9	
Green	Wendy Margaret Miller	234	24.2	
Labour	Helen Louise Stone	179	18.5	
Conservative	Jonathan Gilpin	170	17.6	
Conservative	Christian Jenkins	163	16.8	
Turnout		982	34.06	
Independent gain from Conservative		Swing		
Independent gain from Conservative		Swing		

== Changes 2019–2023 ==
In 2020, Cllr Mike Davies left the Conservatives to sit as an independent over the Conservative Government's handling of the Dominic Cummings breaking of lockdown rules during the COVID-19 pandemic. Since then a separate independent, Cllr Robin Musgrave has joined the Liberal Democrats. The net result was to leave the number of independents unchanged, the number of Conservatives down one and Liberal Democrats up one, thus denying the Conservatives an overall majority. The Conservatives regained a majority on the council in November 2021 following a by-election in the Bere Ferrers ward.

=== Bere Ferrers ===
Bere Ferrers: 18 November 2021
Party	Candidate	Votes	%	±%
Conservative	Angela Blackman	362	32.5	−7.1
Labour	Isabel Saxby	361	32.4	+5.6
Liberal Democrats	Graham Reed	216	19.4	−2.2
Green	Judy Maciejowska	176	15.8	N/A
Majority		1	0.1	
Turnout		1,119	37.5	
Conservative gain from Liberal Democrats		Swing		

=== Tavistock North ===
Tavistock North: 17 February 2022
Party	Candidate	Votes	%	±%
Conservative	David Turnbull	379	39.3	+20.5
Liberal Democrats	Peter Squire	337	35.0	+11.4
Green	Susan Bamford	163	16.9	N/A
Labour	Doug Smith	85	8.8	−14.0
Majority		42	4.4	
Turnout		970	24.56	
Conservative gain from Independent		Swing		
