= 1999 West Devon Borough Council election =

1999 UK local government election

The 1999 West Devon Borough Council election took place on 6 May 1999 to elect members of West Devon Borough Council in England. The whole council was up for election and the council stayed under no overall control.

== Election results ==
West Devon local election result 1999
Party	Seats	Gains	Losses	Net gain/loss	Seats %	Votes %	Votes	+/−
Independent	14			0	46.7			
Conservative	8			+8	26.7			
Liberal Democrats	8			-7	26.7			
Labour	0			-1	0.0			
