= Education in Nottingham =

Education in Nottingham is governed by the unitary authority of Nottingham, overseen by its Nottingham City Council.

== Early years ==
The Nottinghamshire LEA was created by the Education Act 1902. Nottingham City Education Committee took over from the school boards on 1 July 1903.

== Schools ==
From 1974 to 1998 the schools were administered by Nottinghamshire County Council, based on the banks of the River Trent, in Rushcliffe.

== Expansion ==
BBC school broadcasts on television started in September 1957 - four Nottingham schools received the broadcasts from 24 September 1957 to 9 December 1957. WG Jackson, Nottingham Director of Education, said some people say that the vicarious experience of pictures on television is not good for the pupil, but that remains to be seen.

== Former schools ==
=== Secondary modern schools ===
- Bishop Dunn RC Secondary School, in Aspley that opened in 1965, now part of Trinity School, Nottingham
- Cottesmore School for Girls
- Ellis Secondary School, Basford
- Farnborough Secondary School, in Clifton, now Farnborough Spencer Academy
- Fernwood School, now the comprehensive Fernwood School
- Greenwood Bilateral Secondary School for Boys
- St Bernadette's Catholic Secondary School
- William Crane Secondary School for Boys, in Aspley, became William Crane Comprehensive School, closing in 2003

=== Bi-lateral schools ===
- Claremont Secondary Bilateral School for Boys, previously Claremont Secondary Modern School
- Haywood Bilateral School, Sherwood
- Margaret Glen-Bott Bilateral School
- Peveril Bilateral School
- Greenwood Bilateral School

=== Comprehensive schools ===
- Fairham Comprehensive School, Nottingham's first comprehensive school in Clifton, Nottingham
- Hadden Park High School

=== Grammar schools ===
- Bilborough Grammar School, opened in 1957, became Bilborough College in 1975
- Brincliffe Grammar School for Girls (although within the city this was a county school)
- Clifton Hall Girls' Grammar School, opened 1958, closed in 1976
- Forest Fields Grammar School
- Henry Mellish Grammar School, opened in 1929, became a comprehensive and closed as the Henry Mellish School and Specialist Sports College in 2009. (although within the city this was a county school).
- Mundella Grammar School,
- Bluecoat C of E Grammar School
- High Pavement Grammar School, became a sixth form college of New College Nottingham in 1975, now Nottingham College since 2017
- St Catherine's Convent of Mercy Grammar School, later Loreto Grammar School for Girls, now Trinity School, Nottingham

=== Technical schools ===
- People's College Secondary Technical School, a former secondary technical school

== School academic results ==
The unitary authority has not excelled in recent years, but seemed to have elevated marginally in the results league tables. Unfortunately when the exam league tables were reformed (removing modules, and disallowing repeated re-sits) in 2014, to reveal the true extent of GCSE results, the LEA was fourth from bottom (148th) in England (out of 151) with 44.6% gaining five good GCSEs.

Over twenty local authorities in England do not have of those sitting exams getting good results, including Nottingham. Around 1,500 superteachers (known as an Advanced Skills Teacher) are to be sent into these areas to raise attainment. These twenty local authorities have typically had difficulties attracting suitably-qualified staff with relevant degrees.

== Colleges ==
=== Further education ===
- Central College Nottingham was formed in 2012.
- New College Nottingham (NCN) was established in 1999. It has around 3,500 students, and about 900 apprentices.
- The Confetti Institute of Creative Technologies was established in 1994, and has since been bought by Nottingham Trent University.

=== Sixth form ===
- Bilborough Grammar School was opened in 1957 in the west of the district, becoming the much-renowned Bilborough College in 1975, when the Borough of Nottingham, in Nottinghamshire, went comprehensive.

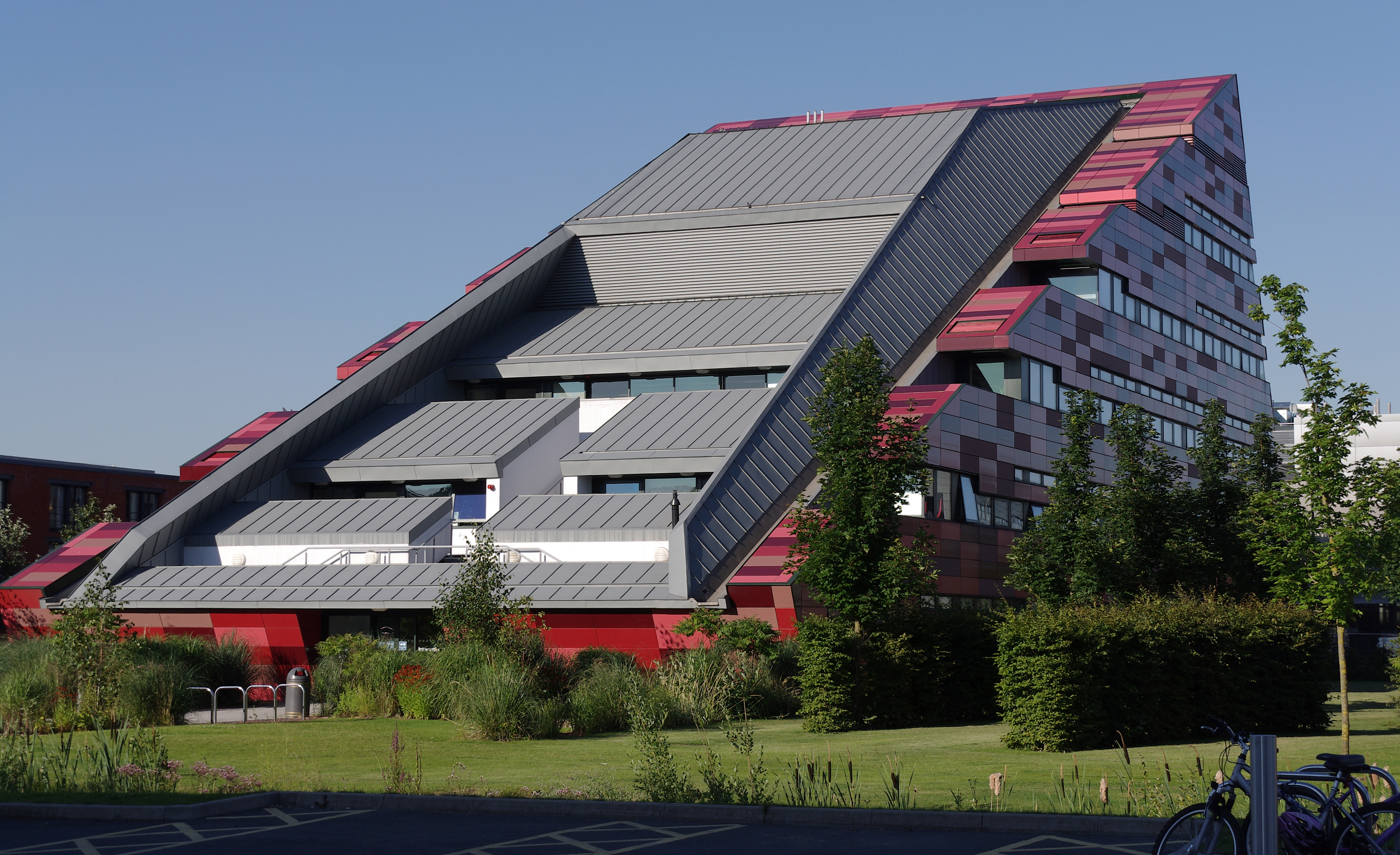
Jubilee Campus of the University of Nottingham in August 2012

== Universities ==
There are around 62,500 students in Nottingham, who spend around £542m a year, an average of £11,000 each, according to Experian.

- University College Nottingham was founded in 1881, and given a Royal Charter in 1948, whereby it had degree-awarding powers, and named itself the University of Nottingham. In the Complete University Guide for 2016, Nottingham comes 25th. It employs around 7,000 staff.
- Nottingham Regional College of Technology opened in 1958, and from 1970 to 1992 was a polytechnic, becoming a university (NTU) in 1992. NTU employs around 5,000 staff, who are mostly part-time. NTU has around 23,000 under-graduates and around 3,000 post-graduates. NTU's Nottingham Business School has around 4,500 students.
- The College of Law was founded in 1962, being granted degree-awarding powers in 2006. It received university status in 2012, changing its name to the University of Law. It opened its Nottingham campus in 2019.

== See also ==
- History of Nottinghamshire
