= Mountains and hills of England =

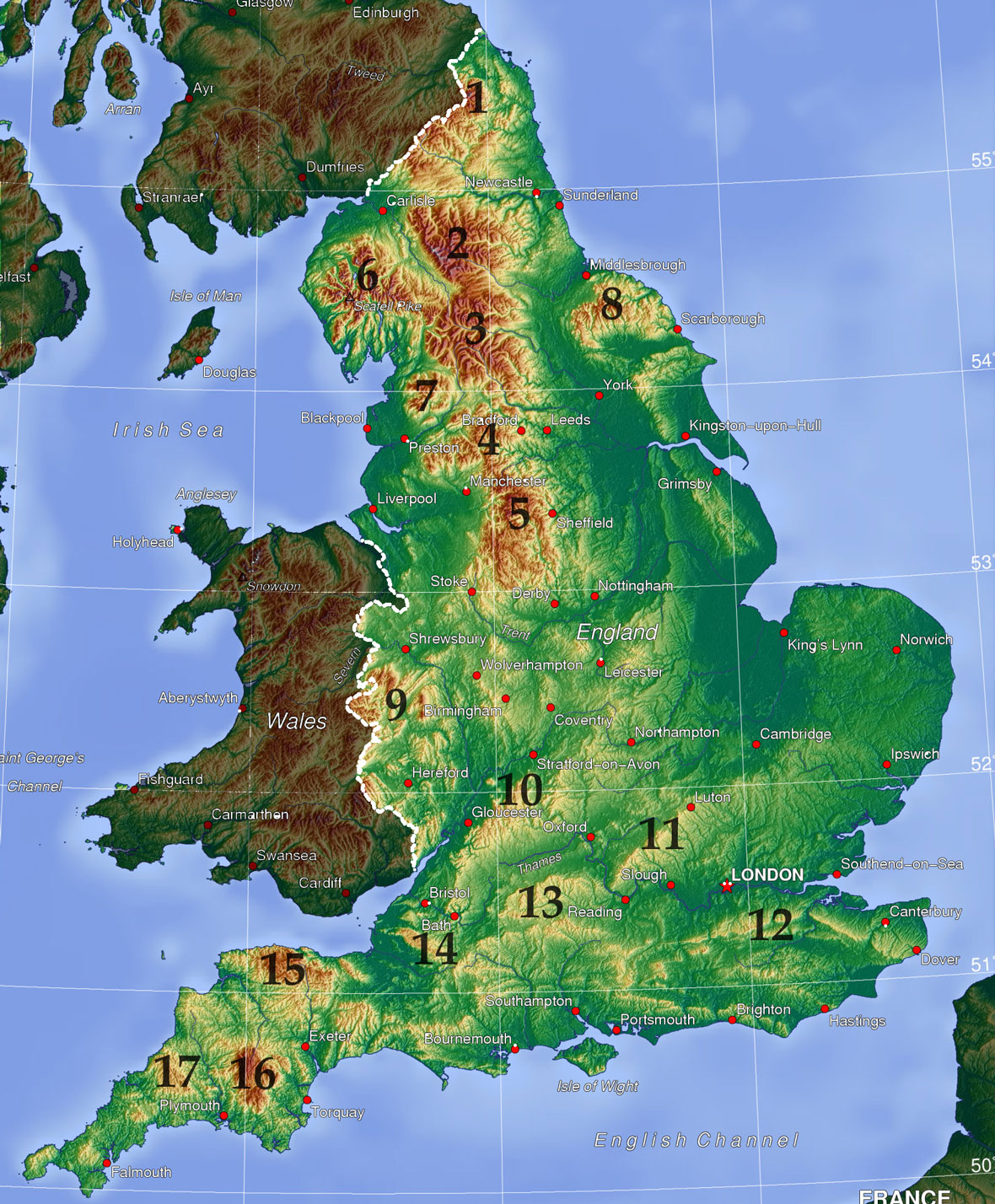
Topographic map of England, with major hilly and upland areas numbered: 1: Cheviot Hills; 2–5, 7: Pennines (2: North Pennines; 3: Yorkshire Dales; 4: South Pennines; 5: Peak District; 7: Forest of Bowland); 6: Lake District; 8: North York Moors; 9: Shropshire Hills; 10: Cotswolds; 11: Chiltern Hills; 12: North Downs; 13: North Wessex Downs; 14: Mendip Hills; 15: Exmoor; 16: Dartmoor; 17: Bodmin Moor

The mountains and hills of England comprise very different kinds of terrain, which reach almost 1,000 metres (3,300 feet) high, to several smaller areas of lower hills, foothills and sea cliffs. Most of the major upland areas have been designated as Areas of Outstanding Natural Beauty (AONB) or national parks. The highest and most extensive areas are in the north and west (including south-west), while the midlands, south-east and east of the country tend to be low-lying.

== Northern England ==
=== Lake District ===
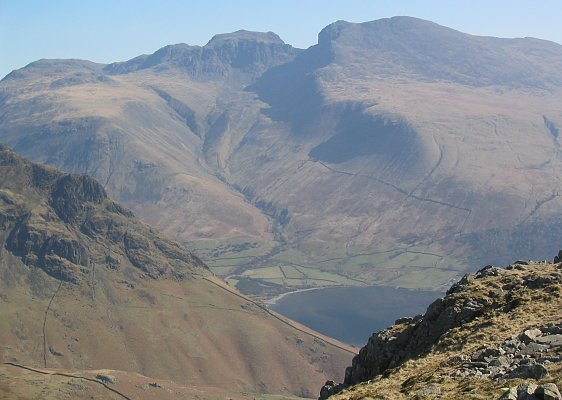
Sca Fell and Scafell Pike in the Lake District

The North of England includes the country's highest mountains, in the Lake District of Cumbria. This was one of the first national parks to be established in the United Kingdom, in 1951. The highest peak is Scafell Pike, 978 m (3,209 ft) above sea level, and at least three other summits exceed 3,000 feet or 914.4 metres making them Furth Munros. The mountains are chiefly Ordovician slates and volcanic rocks, with some limestone and outcrops of other rock types. The peaks were catalogued and described in Alfred Wainwright's seminal Pictorial Guide to the Lakeland Fells series of books, which listed 214 summits, which have subsequently become known as Wainwrights.

=== Border Moors and Forests ===
North of Hadrian's Wall and the Tyne Valley, the land rises to form the Border Moors and Forests, an upland plateau near the southern Anglo-Scottish border. It includes Kielder Water and the Kielder Forest and parts of the area lie in the Northumberland National Park.

=== Cheviot Hills ===
The Cheviot Hills lie north of the Border Moors, which extend into Scotland and could be considered part of either the Southern Uplands or the northern Pennines. They are also included in the Northumberland National Park.

=== Pennines ===
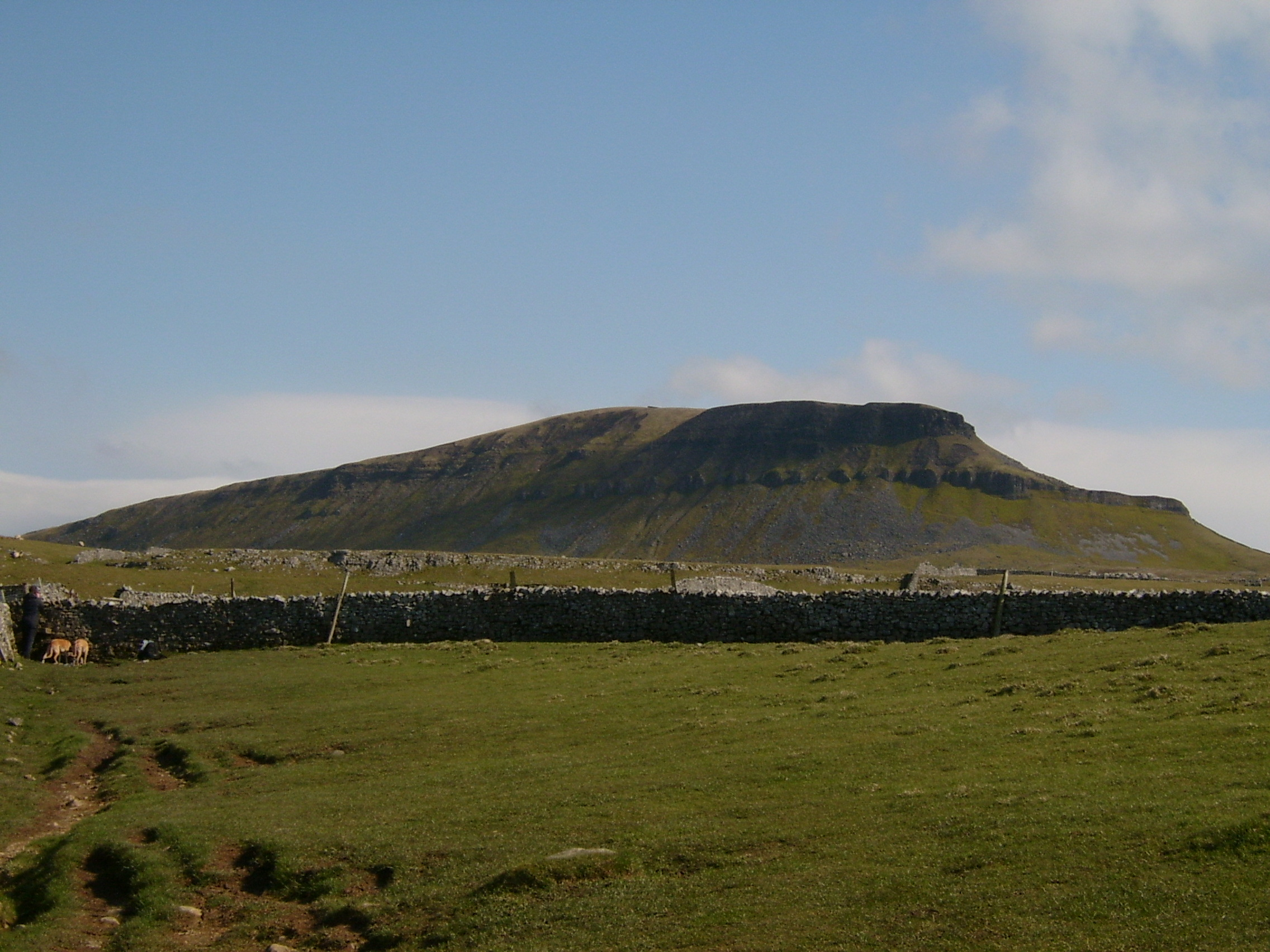
Pen-y-ghent in the Yorkshire Dales

The North Pennines (an Area of Outstanding Natural Beauty, or AONB) lie south of Hadrian's Wall and the Tyne Gap, and east of the Lake District, from which they are separated by the Eden Valley. These are younger rocks, mostly Carboniferous limestone, and the hills are characterised by shallower slopes covered with moorland vegetation, culminating in Cross Fell at 893 m (2,930 ft).

South of this, the main line of the Pennines (often called "the backbone of England") continues into the Yorkshire Dales around the Stainmore Gap, a limestone-dominated area of broad valleys and moorland. The Yorkshire Three Peaks are some of the highest summits in the area, which became a national park in 1954.

The Yorkshire Dales end at the Aire Gap, and a short distance to the south is a range of moorland that rises up between the urban cores of Greater Manchester and West Yorkshire. The range has no continuous name - the western part as far as Blackburn is called the West Pennine Moors, the eastern part north of the A646 (including the famous Ilkley Moor) is called the South Pennines, and the small area in between is known as the Forest of Rossendale. These three groups of hills are dominated by peat bogs over Millstone Grit, and merge into the northern part of the Peak District, known as the Dark Peak, around the Tame Valley, Standedge and Holme Valley. These areas of West Yorkshire are marketed as "Brontë country", and the local landscape provided inspiration for many of the works of the Brontë sisters, including most famously, Wuthering Heights.

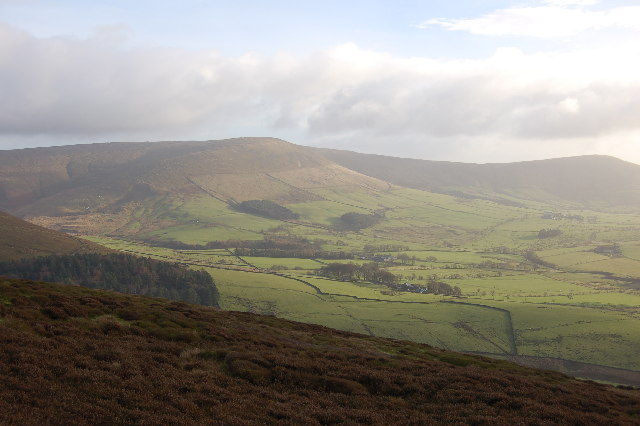
Fair Snape Fell in the Forest of Bowland

The Forest of Bowland AONB, in Lancashire is a western outlier of the Pennines. It is separated from the surrounding Yorkshire Dales and South Pennines by the Aire Gap and Ribble Valley. The isolated Pendle Hill falls within the boundaries of the AONB.

The Peak District was another of the original national parks designated in 1951, and remains one of the most popular in the country, largely because of its proximity to several large cities. One end of the Pennine Way, the first long-distance footpath in the British Isles, is in Edale, in the Peak District, while the other end is at Kirk Yetholm, in the Southern Uplands of Scotland.

The southern part of the Peak District (White Peak), around Buxton and the Hope Valley, is another limestone area, with a number of caves, especially around Castleton. The Peak District marks the southern end of the Pennine chain, as it peters out into the lowlands of the English Midlands around the Trent Valley.

=== Howgill Fells ===
The Howgill Fells are an area of uplands in Cumbria lying between the Lake District and the Yorkshire Dales. The area falls within the boundaries of the Yorkshire Dales National Park and are sometimes considered as a western spur of the Pennines.

=== Orton Fells ===
The Orton Fells are an area of limestone uplands in Cumbria lying between the Lake District and the Eden Valley. The area mostly falls within the boundaries of the Yorkshire Dales National Park with a small part lying in the Lake District National Park. Like the Howgill Fells, the area may be considered a western spur of the Pennines as it predominantly lies in the Yorkshire Dales National Park.

=== North York Moors ===
Near the North Yorkshire coastal towns of Whitby and Scarborough, and extending inland as far as Thirsk, the North York Moors are one of the few major upland areas in eastern England. Reaching a maximum height of 454 m (1,490 ft) at Urra Moor, the North York Moors are home to the RAF Fylingdales radar base. The Jurassic limestone rocks are rich in fossils, which are regularly exposed by erosion of the sea cliffs.

== Midlands ==
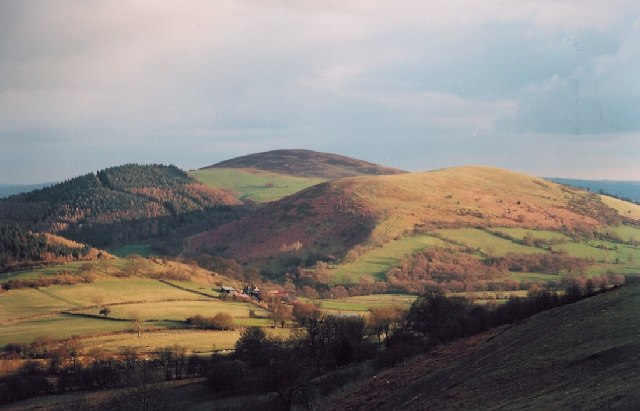
Heath Mynd in Shropshire

The English Midlands are predominantly flat in character, although isolated hills such as Turners Hill can command extensive views. Upland areas lie to the north and west, with parts of the Peak District extending to the north while the Shropshire Hills in the west, close to the Welsh border, reach heights of over 500 metres (1,600 feet), including the Long Mynd, Clee Hills and Stiperstones ridge. Wenlock Edge, running through the middle of the Shropshire Hills AONB, is a long, low ridge, which extends for over 15 miles (24 km). Further south, the Welsh border reaches over 700 metres (2,300 feet) high at Black Mountain, which is thus the highest point in Herefordshire.

The Malverns are made from some of the oldest rock in England (around 680 million years old) and extend some 8 miles (13 km) through two West Midlands counties Worcestershire and Herefordshire as well as northern Gloucestershire in the southwest. The highest point of the hills is the Worcestershire Beacon at 425 m (1,394 ft) above sea level (OS Grid reference SO768452).

The Cotswolds extend over 90 miles (140 km), and over six counties (Oxfordshire, Gloucestershire, Wiltshire, Somerset, Warwickshire and Worcestershire), but centred on Gloucestershire. They reach 330 m (1,083 ft) high at Cleeve Hill, and were designated an AONB in 1966.

Areas of lower hills in the Midlands include Cannock Chase in Staffordshire, Charnwood Forest in Leicestershire and the Lincolnshire Wolds.

== South East England ==
South East England, including East Anglia and London, is predominantly low lying. The underlying rock is chalk, and meaningful elevations are only attained in the Chiltern Hills (Haddington Hill: 267 m [876 ft]), the North Wessex Downs (Walbury Hill: 297 m [974 ft]), the North Downs (Leith Hill: 294 m [965 ft]) and the South Downs (which includes the chalk cliffs at Beachy Head and Seven Sisters).

== South West England ==
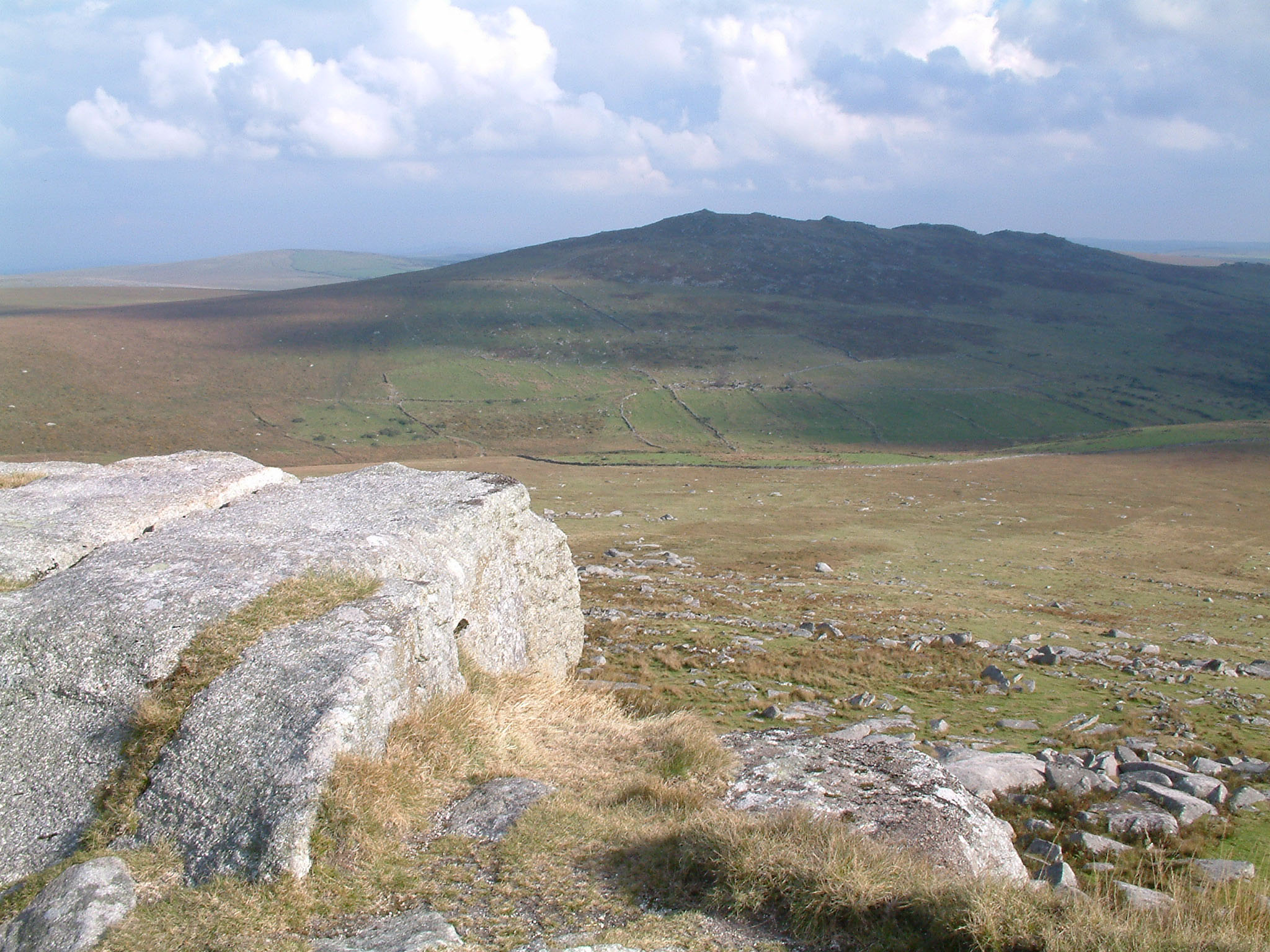
Brown Willy, Bodmin Moor

South of Bristol and Bath, the Mendip Hills (Black Down: 325 m [1,066 ft]) are the first group of hills in South West England. The Purbeck Hills (and their continuation onto the Isle of Wight) line the south coast, and a number of other groups of hills are also present in the area: the Quantock Hills (Will's Neck: 384 m [1,260 ft]), Blackdown Hills, Dorset Downs, Salisbury Plain and Cranborne Chase. Glastonbury Tor, although of only modest height (158 m [518 ft]), is significant for its claimed association with Arthurian legend.

The highest and largest upland areas in the south-west are, however, the moors of the South-west Peninsula. Exmoor, in northern Somerset, and abutting the Bristol Channel, reaches 519 m (1,703 ft) at Dunkery Beacon, and is famous as the setting of Lorna Doone. Dartmoor, in Devon, reaches over 600 metres (2,000 feet) (High Willhays: 621 m [2,037 ft]), and was the landscape for The Hound of the Baskervilles. High Willhays is also regarded by many as one of only two true mountains in the South of England, along with its sister peak, Yes Tor.

Bodmin Moor, further to the south-west, is smaller (Brown Willy: 420 m [1,378 ft]). Like Dartmoor, it is a granite plateau, whereas Exmoor is formed from Devonian sediments.

== Table of hill groups above 300 metres ==
This table uses 30 metres topographic prominence as the definition of a separate hill, as is common in the British Isles.

Hill group	List of summits	Summits						
Hill group	List of summits	>900m	>800m	>700m	>600m	>500m	>400m	>300m
Lake District	list	8	38	85	117	166	225	294
Northumberland	list		1	2	8	30	68	118
North Pennines north of Stainmore Gap	list		3	12	26	43	57	69
Yorkshire Dales	list			7	36	72	103	135
North York Moors	list						7	19
Forest of Bowland	list					5	15	26
South Pennines north of Standedge	list					1	24	49
Peak District	list				2	22	66	156
Shropshire Hills	list					5	33	89
Western Herefordshire	list			1	1	1	3	26
Malvern Hills	list						1	4
Cotswolds	list							4
Mendip Hills	list							4
Quantock Hills	list							5
Blackdown Hills	list							1
Exmoor	list					1	12	38
Dartmoor	list				3	14	38	61
Tamar Valley	list							1
Bodmin Moor	list						2	22
Hensbarrow	list							6
Totals		8	42	107	193	360	654	1,127

== See also ==
- Hill lists in the British Isles
- List of English counties by highest point
- List of Hewitts and Nuttalls in England
