= 2015 West Devon Borough Council election =

2015 UK local government election

Results of the 2015 West Devon Borough Council election

The 2015 West Devon Borough Council election took place on 7 May 2015, to elect members of West Devon Borough Council in England. This was on the same day as other local elections across England.
