= Tamar Valley National Landscape =

Area of Outstanding Natural Beauty in England

Tamar Valley National Landscapehill

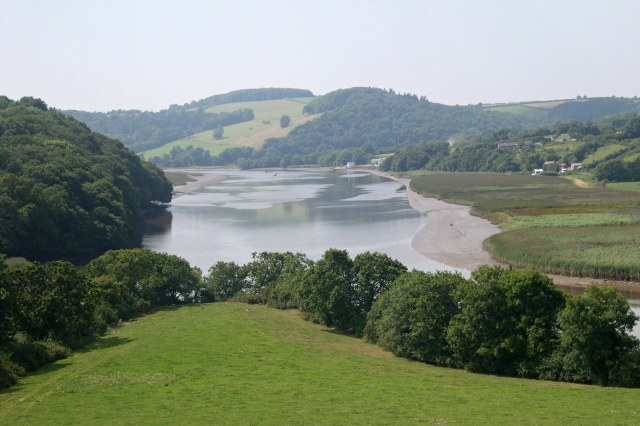
- View of the River Tamar and Tamar Valley National Landscape

- Location of the National Landscape in England
- Location: Devon and Cornwall, England
- Coordinates: 50.50243°N 4.18846°W
- Area: 190 km^{2} (73 sq mi)
- Established: 1995
- Website: tamarvalley-nl.org.uk

Tamar Valley National Landscape is a legally designated Area of Outstanding Natural Beauty in Devon and Cornwall in England. It includes an area of 75 square miles (190 km^{2}) covering the lower parts of the valleys of the River Tamar, River Tavy and River Lynher to the north and west of Plymouth.

== History ==
There has been mining in the area for hundreds of years, in 1844 a copper seam was discovered that was so big it led to a 50-year mining boom and the creation of Europe's biggest copper mine, Devon Great Consols. The copper ran low during the 1890s leading to mass unemployment and the emigration of surplus workers.

== World Heritage Site ==
The valley is incorporated inside the Cornwall and West Devon Mining Landscape which is a World Heritage Site. The site was added to the World Heritage List during the 30th session of the UNESCO World Heritage Committee in Vilnius, July 2006.

== Landmarks ==
There are numerous landmarks and listed buildings including Devon Great Consols, the Tamar Valley Line and the National Trust's Cotehele and Buckland Abbey.

The area is somewhat hilly. The Database of British Hills lists the following summits within the National Landscape that have more than 30 metres prominence:

1. Kit Hill (334.1m)
2. Morewelldown (204m)
3. Gunoak Hill (180m)
4. Walreddon Hill (170m)
5. Quarry Cross (161.2m)
6. Castlepark Hill (135m)
7. Cumble Tor (112m)
8. Windmills Hill (112m)
9. Tor Hill (89m)
10. Berry Down (82m)
11. Erth Hill (67m)

== Facilities ==
=== Tamar Trails ===
Tamar Trails is a collection of trails in the Tamar Valley, created by West Devon Borough Council and The Tamar Valley Area of Outstanding Natural Beauty with funding from a number of organisations including the Heritage Lottery Fund, the South West Regional Development Agency and Devon County Council. The Tamar Trails were built to allow access to the heritage and natural features of the valley via a series of new cycling and footpaths. The trails stretch 25 km across the Tamar Valley, taking in historic mines and woodland. The building work started in 2007 and finished in 2013 with a total investment of £7 million. A partnership of organisations own the trails which are managed by Tamar Community Trust. The trail passes wooded copses and disused mine workings and is used for walking, cycling, mountain biking, jogging or segway.

=== Natural beauty ===
The Valley was designated due to the natural beauty of its hills, valleys, forests, meadows and associated landscapes. The water has created good farmland and provides otters with a natural habitat. The birdlife includes avocets and wigeons.

=== Activities ===
There is canoeing, walking, horse riding, cycling, archery, a visitor centre with a cafe and tree surfing Tamar Trails Parkrun takes place each week starting at the Tamar Trails visitor centre. There is a heritage train service on the scenic Tamar Valley Line, boat trips on the Tamar Passenger Ferry or river cruises from Plymouth.
