= 2023 West Devon Borough Council election =

← 2019	4 May 2023	2027 →

All 31 seats to West Devon Borough Council 16 seats needed for a majority
- Turnout: 39.07%

	First party	Second party	Third party
Leader	Neil Jory	Ric Cheadle	Lynn Daniel
Party	Conservative	Independent	Green
Leader's seat	Milton Ford	Buckland Monachorum	South Tawton
Last election	16 seats, 37.9%	11 seats, 30.7%	2 seats, 11.8%
Seats before	17	11 (Note: Of the 11 independent councillors before the election, 9 formed the "West Devon Alliance" with the Liberal Democrats and Greens, led by Ric Cheadle, the other 2 independents were not aligned to any group.)	2
Seats after	11	10	5
Seat change	▼6	▼1	▲3
Popular vote	9,829	6,897	4,318
Percentage	39.60%	27.78%	17.40%
Swing	▲1.70%	▼2.92%	▲5.60%
	Fourth party	Fifth party
Party	Liberal Democrats	Labour
Last election	2 seats, 6.9%	0 seats, 10.5%%
Seats before	1	0
Seats after	4	1
Seat change	▲2	▲1
Popular vote	2,626	1,024
Percentage	10.58%	4.13%
Swing	▲3.68%	▼7.27%
- Winner of each seat at the 2023 West Devon Borough Council election
Leader before election
Neil Jory
Conservative
Leader after election
Mandy Ewings
Independent
No overall control

The 2023 West Devon Borough Council election took place on 4 May 2023, to elect members of West Devon Borough Council in England. This was on the same day as other local elections across England. The election for Burrator ward was delayed until 15 June 2023 following the death of one of the original candidates.

Prior to the election the council was under Conservative majority control. The election saw the council go under no overall control. The independent councillors, Greens, Liberal Democrats and Labour formed a coalition called the "West Devon Alliance" which took control, with independent councillor Mandy Ewings being appointed leader of the council at the subsequent annual council meeting on 30 May 2023.

== Results summary ==
The overall results were as follows:

=== Election result ===
2019 West Devon Borough Council election
Party	Candidates	Seats	Gains	Losses	Net gain/loss	Seats %	Votes %	Votes	+/−
Conservative	29	11	0	5	▼5	35.48	39.60	9,829	▲1.70
Independent	13	10	3	4	▼1	32.26	27.78	6,897	▼2.92
Green	13	5	4	1	▲3	16.13	17.40	4,318	▲5.60
Liberal Democrats	8	4	3	1	▲2	6.45	10.58	2,626	▲3.68
Labour	2	1	1	0	▲1	3.23	4.13	1,024	▼7.27
Reform	2	0	0	0	Steady	0.00	0.52	130	N/A

== Ward results ==
The results for each ward were as follows, with an asterisk (*) indicating a sitting councillor standing for re-election.

=== Bere Ferrers ===
Bere Ferrers (2)
Party	Candidate	Votes	%	±%
Labour	Isabel Angela Saxby	757	59.65	+32.9
Conservative	Angela Blackman *	478	37.67	N/A
Conservative	Peter Edward Crozier *	453	35.70	−3.9
Liberal Democrats	Graham Richard Reed	399	31.44	−9.7
Turnout		1269	43.94	
Labour gain from Liberal Democrats		Swing		
Conservative hold		Swing		

=== Bridestowe ===
Bridestowe (2)
Party	Candidate	Votes	%	±%
Conservative	Caroline Marie Mott *	507	56.02	−6.8
Conservative	Terry Southcott *	463	51.16	−5.1
Green	Patrick John Jeffery	401	44.31	N/A
Turnout		916	35.56	
Conservative hold		Swing		
Conservative hold		Swing		

=== Buckland Monachorum ===
Buckland Monachorum (2)
Party	Candidate	Votes	%	±%
Independent	Ric Cheadle *	873	68.85	+9.5
Independent	Alastair Clark Cunningham	498	39.28	N/A
Conservative	Philip Richard Saunders	409	32.26	−2.1
Liberal Democrats	Ashley-Ross Christopher West	334	26.34	+9.1
Turnout		1277	41.99	
Independent hold		Swing		
Independent gain from Green		Swing		

=== Burrator ===
The election in Burrator ward was delayed until 15 June 2023 following the death of Green Party candidate Neil Jameson.

Burrator (2)
Party	Candidate	Votes	%	±%
Liberal Democrats	Nicola Viney	510	56.23	+56.2
Liberal Democrats	Christopher Paul West	401	44.21	N/A
Conservative	Diana Elizabeth Moyse*	275	30.32	+30.3
Conservative	Felix Davies	221	24.37	N/A
Green	Dave Miller	166	18.30	N/A
Labour	John Edward Churchley	101	11.14	N/A
Green	Sam North	76	8.38	N/A
Turnout		907	31.97	
Registered electors		2,843		
Liberal Democrats hold		Swing		
Liberal Democrats gain from Conservative		Swing		

=== Chagford ===
Chagford (1)
Party	Candidate	Votes	%	±%
Green	Jane Elliott *	485	65.28	+16.8
Conservative	Nicky Heyworth	258	34.72	−16.8
Turnout		754	58.68	
Green gain from Conservative		Swing		

=== Dartmoor ===
Dartmoor (1)
Party	Candidate	Votes	%	±%
Independent	Mark Christian Renders *	404	74.27	−4.8
Liberal Democrats	Holly Greenberry-Pullen	140	25.73	N/A
Turnout		547	38.55	
Independent hold		Swing		

=== Drewsteignton ===
Drewsteignton (1)
Party	Candidate	Votes	%	±%
Green	Steven William Guthrie	292	51.14	+12.6
Conservative	Paul James Ridgers*	279	48.86	−2.5
Turnout		573	42.63	
Green gain from Conservative		Swing		

=== Exbourne ===
Exbourne (2)
Party	Candidate	Votes	%	±%
Conservative	Louise Sacha Watts	613	50.54	−3.7
Conservative	Mike Casbolt	575	47.40	−2.8
Liberal Democrats	Christian Martin	541	44.60	N/A
Green	Judy Sara Marguerita Maciejowska	435	35.86	−4.6
Turnout		1226	37.50	
Conservative hold		Swing		
Conservative hold		Swing		

=== Hatherleigh ===
Hatherleigh (2)
Party	Candidate	Votes	%	±%
Conservative	Patrick John Derek Kimber *	579	68.85	+68.85
Conservative	Samantha Jane Wakeham	430	51.13	+51.13
Green	Andrew Robert Pratt	289	34.36	N/A
Turnout		847	33.60	
Conservative hold		Swing		
Conservative hold		Swing		

=== Mary Tavy ===
Mary Tavy (1)
Party	Candidate	Votes	%	±%
Independent	Robert John Oxborough	240	41.45	N/A
Conservative	Jonathan Stanley Gilpin	127	21.93	−13.7
Independent	Dave Herbert	113	19.52	N/A
Liberal Democrats	Andrew Gordon Lynn Brown	99	17.10	N/A
Turnout		586	44.63	
Independent gain from Independent		Swing		

=== Milton Ford ===
Milton Ford (1)
Party	Candidate	Votes	%	±%
Conservative	Neil Jory *	Unopposed	N/A	−66.9
Turnout		N/A	N/A	
Conservative hold		Swing		

=== Okehampton North ===
Okehampton North (3)
Party	Candidate	Votes	%	±%
Independent	Tony Leech *	695	50.44	−12.3
Conservative	Kevin Ball *	548	39.77	−1.4
Liberal Democrats	George Herbert Dexter	428	31.06	N/A
Conservative	Lois Esther Samuel	425	30.84	−12.0
Green	Colin James Trier	370	26.85	N/A
Conservative	Peter Cecil Eastment	312	22.64	−7.3
Independent	Deborah Judith Sanger	310	22.50	N/A
Labour	Finley Lewis Reece Morris	267	19.38	−12.8
Turnout		1387	32.29	
Independent hold		Swing		
Conservative hold		Swing		
Liberal Democrats gain from Conservative		Swing		

=== Okehampton South ===
Okehampton South (2)
Party	Candidate	Votes	%	±%
Independent	Paul Richard Vachon *	433	53.46	+5.6
Green	Malcolm William Calder	417	51.48	+15.4
Conservative	Julie Veronica Yelland *	368	45.43	+7.6
Conservative	Clare Mary Gerardine Kemp	194	23.95	−2.2
Turnout		810	28.59	
Independent hold		Swing		
Green gain from Conservative		Swing		

=== South Tawton ===
South Tawton (1)
Party	Candidate	Votes	%	±%
Green	Lynn Christine Daniel *	476	68.20	+7.0
Conservative	Simon John Powell	222	31.80	−7.0
Turnout		705	45.78	
Green hold		Swing	+7.0	

=== Tamarside ===
Tamarside (1)
Party	Candidate	Votes	%	±%
Conservative	Chris Edmonds *	313	64.01	−9.4
Green	Matthew Paul Faith	141	28.83	N/A
Reform	Lawrence Grose	35	7.16	N/A
Turnout		492	34.26	
Conservative hold		Swing	-8.0	

=== Tavistock North ===
Tavistock North (3)
Party	Candidate	Votes	%	±%
Independent	Jeff Moody *	822	57.08	−3.7
Liberal Democrats	Pete Squire	685	47.57	+24.0
Green	Terry Vincent Wheeler	540	37.50	N/A
Independent	Michael Arthur Fife Cook	505	35.07	N/A
Conservative	David Edward Turnbull *	414	28.75	+10.0
Conservative	Judy Ann Hughes	333	23.13	+4.7
Conservative	John Nicholas Gray	268	18.61	N/A
Reform	Brian Anthony Arden Trew	95	6.60	N/A
Turnout		1442	35.67	
Independent hold		Swing		
Liberal Democrats gain from Independent		Swing		
Green gain from Independent		Swing		

=== Tavistock South East ===
Tavistock South East (2)
Party	Candidate	Votes	%	±%
Independent	Adam Duncan Bridgewater	734	60.36	N/A
Conservative	Debo Sellis *	604	49.67	−0.1
Green	Amy St. Clair Hookway	472	38.82	+9.8
Conservative	Richard Ivor John Phillips	378	31.09	−0.1
Turnout		1224	42.44	
Independent gain from Independent		Swing		
Conservative hold		Swing		

=== Tavistock South West ===
Tavistock South West (2)
Party	Candidate	Votes	%	±%
Independent	Anne Johnson	662	77.07	N/A
Independent	Mandy Victoria Louise Ewings *	608	70.78	+18.7
Conservative	Andy Nelson	157	18.28	+0.7
Conservative	Candy Gynn-Martin	122	14.20	−2.6
Turnout		860	29.07	
Independent hold		Swing		
Independent hold		Swing		

== By-elections ==
=== Tavistock North (June 2023) ===
Tavistock North by-election, 22 June 2023
Party	Candidate	Votes	%	±%
Independent	Ursula Forhan Mann	233	25.49	N/A
Liberal Democrats	Holly Greenbury-Pullen	233	25.49	−22.1
Green	Annabel Judith Martn	215	23.52	−14.0
Conservative	Judy Ann Hughes	176	19.26	−3.9
Labour	Uwem Eno Udo	57	6.24	N/A
Turnout		914	22.68	−12.99
Independent gain from Green		Swing		

The Tavistock North by-election was triggered by the resignation of Green councillor Terry Wheeler. The Independent and Liberal Democrat candidates won the same number of votes, but the Independent was elected on the drawing of lots.

=== Tavistock North (May 2024) ===
Tavistock North by-election, 2 May 2024
Party	Candidate	Votes	%	±%
Liberal Democrats	Holly Greenbury-Pullen	387	28.1	−19.5
Conservative	Judy Ann Hughes	348	25.2	+2.1
Green	Sara Louise Wood	289	21.0	−16.5
Labour	Uwem Eno Udo	195	14.1	N/A
Independent	Michael Fife Cook	160	11.6	−23.5
Turnout		1,379	33.78	
Liberal Democrats hold				

By-election triggered by resignation of Liberal Democrat councillor Pete Squire.

=== Tavistock North (May 2025) ===
Tavistock North by-election, 1 May 2025
Party	Candidate	Votes	%	±%
Liberal Democrats	Graham Reed	485	31.0	+4.2
Conservative	Judy Hughes	402	25.7	+9.5
Reform	Brian Trew	355	22.7	+19.0
Green	Sara Louise Wood	165	10.6	–10.5
Labour	Uwem Udo	155	9.9	N/A
Majority		83	5.4	N/A
Turnout		1,562	38.4	+2.7
Liberal Democrats gain from Independent		Swing	▼2.7	

=== Okehampton South ===
Okehampton South by-election: 6 November 2025
Party	Candidate	Votes	%	±%
Liberal Democrats	Jan Goffey	356	57.1	N/A
Conservative	Lois Samuel	152	24.4	–5.8
Independent	Julie Yelland	116	18.6	N/A
Majority		204	32.7	N/A
Turnout		631	22.2	–6.4
Registered electors		2,841		
Liberal Democrats gain from Green				
