= History of Rutland =

The history of the English county of Rutland, located in the East Midlands. It was reconstituted as a district of Leicestershire in 1974 by the Local Government Act 1972. This district was given unitary authority status on 1 April 1997.

== Early history ==
The north-western part of the county of Rutland was recorded as Rutland, a detached part of Nottinghamshire, in the Domesday Book; the south-eastern part as the wapentake of Wicelsea in Northamptonshire. It was first mentioned as a separate county in 1159, but as late as the 14th century it was referred to as the 'Soke of Rutland'.

In 1584 Uppingham School and Oakham School, two of the earliest public schools of England, were founded in Rutland with a hospital, or almshouse, by Archdeacon Robert Johnson. Both of the original school buildings remain standing.

Earl of Rutland and Duke of Rutland are titles in the peerage of England held in the Manners family, derived from the traditional county of Rutland. The Earl of Rutland was elevated to the status of Duke in 1703 and the titles were merged. The family seat is at Belvoir Castle, Leicestershire.

== Modern history ==
A map of Rutland from Darton's New miniature atlas (1820)

The hundreds of Rutland

By the time of the 19th century it had been divided into the hundreds of Alstoe, East, Martinsley, Oakham and Wrandike.

Rutland covered parts of three poor law unions and rural sanitary districts (RSDs): those of Oakham, Uppingham and Stamford. The registration county of Rutland contained the entirety of Oakham and Uppingham RSDs, which included several parishes in Leicestershire and Northamptonshire – the eastern part in Stamford RSD was included in the Lincolnshire registration county. Rutland gained its own county council by virtue of the Local Government Act 1888.

In 1894 under the Local Government Act 1894 the rural sanitary districts were partitioned along county boundaries to form three rural districts. The part of Oakham and Uppingham RSDs in Rutland formed the Oakham Rural District and Uppingham Rural District, with the two parishes from Oakham RSD in Leicestershire becoming part of the Melton Mowbray Rural District, the 9 parishes of Uppingham RSD in Leicestershire becoming the Hallaton Rural District, and the 6 parishes of Uppingham RSD in Northamptonshire becoming Gretton Rural District. Meanwhile, that part of Stamford RSD in Rutland became the Ketton Rural District. Oakham was split out from Oakham Rural District in 1911 as an urban district.

In the Second World War, the county became home to three Royal Air Force bomber stations, opened at Cottesmore, North Luffenham and Woolfox Lodge. While the latter closed in 1966, the others retained a major defence function in the hands of the British Army when Cottesmore became home of Kendrew Barracks in 2012, and North Luffenham of St George's Barracks in 1998.

The Local Government Boundary Commission (1945–1949) recommended merger with Leicestershire. Rutland was included in the "East Midlands General Review Area" of the 1958–1967 Local Government Commission for England. Draft recommendations would have seen Rutland split, with Ketton Rural District going along with Stamford to a new administrative county of Cambridgeshire, and the western part be added to Leicestershire. The final proposals were less radical and instead proposed that Rutland become a single rural district within the administrative county of Leicestershire. This victory was to prove only temporary, with Rutland being included in the new non-metropolitan county of Leicestershire under the Local Government Act 1972, from 1 April 1974. Under proposals for non-metropolitan districts Rutland would have been paired with what now constitutes the Melton district – the revised and implemented proposals made Rutland a standalone non-metropolitan district (breaking the 40,000 minimum population barrier).

In 1994, the Local Government Commission for England, which was conducting a structural review of English local government, recommended that Rutland become a unitary authority. This was implemented on 1 April 1997, with Rutland regaining a separate Lieutenancy as well as its council regaining control of county functions such as education and social services. The council remained formally a non-metropolitan district council, with wards rather than electoral divisions, but has renamed the district to 'Rutland County Council' to allow it to use that name. This means the full legal name of the council is Rutland County Council District Council.

== See also ==
- History of England
