= West Devon =

Coordinates: 50°38′N 4°06′W

West Devon Borough of West Devon
- Non-metropolitan district and borough
- West Devon shown within Devon
- Sovereign state: United Kingdom
- Constituent country: England
- Region: South West England
- Non-metropolitan county: Devon
- Status: Non-metropolitan district
- Admin HQ: Tavistock
- Formed: 1 April 1974

Government
  - Type: Non-metropolitan district council
  - Body: West Devon Borough Council
  - MPs: Geoffrey Cox; Rebecca Smith; Mel Stride

Area
  - Total: 448.3 sq mi (1,161.1 km^{2})
  - Rank: 21st (of 296)

Population (2025)
  - Total: 58,980
  - Rank: 292nd (of 296)
  - Density: 131.6/sq mi (50.80/km^{2})
  - Ethnicity: 97.8% White (94.9% White British)
- Time zone: UTC0 (GMT)
  - Summer (DST): UTC+1 (BST)
- ONS code: 18UL (ONS); E07000047 (GSS)
- OS grid reference: SX5150683684

West Devon is a local government district with borough status in Devon, England. Its council is based in Tavistock, the borough's largest town. The borough also includes the towns of Hatherleigh, North Tawton and Okehampton, along with numerous villages and surrounding rural areas.

A large area in the south-east of the borough lies within the Dartmoor National Park, and part of the south-west of the borough lies within the Tamar Valley Area of Outstanding Natural Beauty.

The neighbouring districts are Torridge, Mid Devon, Teignbridge, South Hams and Cornwall.

== History ==
The district was formed on 1 April 1974 under the Local Government Act 1972, covering the area of three former districts which were all abolished at the same time:

- Okehampton Municipal Borough
- Okehampton Rural District
- Tavistock Rural District

The new district was named West Devon, reflecting its location within the wider county.

The district was originally planned to also cover Holsworthy Rural District. It was then decided to split another new district and make them two districts (North Devon and Torridge) and extract Holsworthy from West Devon.

On 27 April 1982 the district was awarded borough status, allowing the chair of the council to take the title of mayor.

Under current local government restructuring plans it is planned that the district will be abolished in 2028 with its area becoming part of a new Devon unitary authority.

== Governance ==
West Devon Borough Council

Type
- Type: Non-metropolitan district council

History
- Founded: 1 April 1974

Leadership
- Mayor: Chris Edmonds, Conservative since 19 May 2026
- Leader: Mandy Ewings, Independent since 30 May 2023
- Chief Executive: Andy Bates since June 2020

Structure
- Seats: 31 councillors
- Graph of the party split among 31 seats.
- Political groups: Administration (19) Liberal Democrats (6) Green (3) Independent (10) Other parties (12) Conservative (10) Labour (1) Independent (1)

Elections
- Voting system: First past the post
- Last election: 4 May 2023

Meeting place
- Kilworthy Park, Drake Road, Tavistock, PL19 0BZ

Website
- www.westdevon.gov.uk

Constitution
- The Constitution of West Devon Borough Council

West Devon Borough Council provides district-level services. County-level services are provided by Devon County Council. The whole borough is also covered by civil parishes, which form a third tier of local government.

In the parts of the borough within the Dartmoor National Park, town planning is the responsibility of the Dartmoor National Park Authority. The borough council appoints two of its councillors to serve on the 19-person National Park Authority.

=== Political control ===
The council has been under no overall control since the 2023 election, being led by a coalition of the independent councillors, Greens, Liberal Democrats and Labour. Labour left the coalition in November 2026.

The first election to the council was held in 1973, initially operating as a shadow authority alongside the outgoing authorities until the new arrangements came into effect on 1 April 1974. Political control of the council since 1974 has been as follows:

Party in control	Years
Independent	1974–1987
No overall control	1987–1991
Independent	1991–1995
Liberal Democrats	1995–1999
No overall control	1999–2015
Conservative	2015–2020
No overall control	2020–2021
Conservative	2021–2023
No overall control	2023–present

=== Leadership ===
The role of mayor is largely ceremonial in West Devon. Political leadership is instead provided by the leader of the council. The leaders since 2012 have been:

Councillor	Party	From	To
James McInnes	Conservative		May 2012
Philip Sanders	Conservative	15 May 2012	May 2019
Neil Jory	Conservative	21 May 2019	May 2023
Mandy Ewings	Independent	30 May 2023	

=== Composition ===
Following the 2023 election, and subsequent by-elections and changes of allegiance up to August 2026, the composition of the council was:

Party	Councillors
Conservative	10
Liberal Democrats	6
Green	3
Labour	1
Independent	11
Total	31

Ten of the independent councillors, the Greens, Liberal Democrats and Labour sit together as the "West Devon Alliance" group, which forms the council's administration. The other independent councillor does not belong to a group.

=== Elections ===
Since the last boundary changes in 2015, the council has comprised 31 councillors representing 18 wards, with each ward electing one, two or three councillors. Elections are held every four years.

In the EU referendum of 2016, the majority of voters in West Devon voted to leave the European Union (18,937 to 16,658, that is 53.2% to 46.8%). The turnout was 81.25%.

The borough straddles the constituencies of Central Devon, South West Devon and Torridge and Tavistock.

=== Premises ===
The council is based at Kilworthy Park in Tavistock, being a modern office built on the site of the goods yard of the old Tavistock North railway station.

== Towns and parishes ==
The whole borough is divided into civil parishes. The parishes councils for Hatherleigh, North Tawton, Okehampton and Tavistock take the style "town council". The small parish of Kelly has a parish meeting rather than a parish council.

== Town Twinning ==
West Devon has been twinned with Wesseling, Germany since 1983.

== Arms ==
Coat of arms of West Devon Borough Council

Notes
Granted 3 December 1975 by the College of Arms.
Crest
On a mount Vert a Dartmoor Pony supporting by the sinister forelef an oak branch all Proper.
Torse
Or Gules and Azure.
Escutcheon
Quarterly Gules and chequy Or and Azure over all a pale wavy Argent charged with a pallet wavy Azure between in the first quarter a fleece Or in the fourth quarter upon a base masoned a tower with portal and window also masoned Proper.
Motto
Crescit Sub Pondere Virtus

== See also ==
- Grade I listed buildings in West Devon
- Grade II* listed buildings in West Devon
- Exeter to Plymouth railway of the LSWR
