= Test Valley Borough Council elections =

Local government elections in Hampshire, England

Test Valley Borough Council is elected every four years.

== Council elections ==
Composition of the council
Year	Conservative	Liberal Democrats (Note: Includes totals for the predecessors of the Liberal Democrats, the Liberal Party and SDP (both of which participated in the Alliance).)	Labour	Independents & Others	Council control after election
Local government reorganisation; council established (43 seats)
1973	9	7	5	22	Independent
New ward boundaries (44 seats)
1976	20	4	3	17	No overall control
1979	31	4	3	6	Conservative
1983	34	4	1	5	Conservative
1987	26	14	0	4	Conservative
1991	28	13	0	3	Conservative
1995	22	22	0	0	No overall control
1999	28	15	0	1	Conservative
New ward boundaries (48 seats)
2003	30	16	0	2	Conservative
2007	33	15	0	0	Conservative
2011	36	12	0	0	Conservative
2015	38	9	0	2	Conservative
New ward boundaries (43 seats)
2019	24	12	0	7 (Note: 7 Andover Alliance)	Conservative
2023	26	17	0	0	Conservative

== Result maps ==
2003 results

2007 results

2011 results

2015 results

2019 results

2023 results

== By-election results ==
=== 1995-1999 ===
Weyhill By-Election 3 October 1996
Party	Candidate	Votes	%	±%
Conservative		565	55.6	
Liberal Democrats		288	28.4	
Labour		119	11.7	
UKIP		44	4.3	
Majority		277	27.2	
Turnout		1,016	37.0	
Conservative hold		Swing		

Chilworth & Nursling By-Election 9 January 1997
Party	Candidate	Votes	%	±%
Liberal Democrats		897	54.4	
Conservative		630	38.2	
Labour		122	7.4	
Majority		267	16.2	
Turnout		1,649	32.0	
Liberal Democrats gain from Conservative		Swing		

Tadburn By-Election 30 April 1998
Party	Candidate	Votes	%	±%
Liberal Democrats		423	50.1	−9.6
Conservative		422	49.9	+23.7
Majority		1	0.2	
Turnout		845	24.0	
Liberal Democrats hold		Swing		

Tedworth By-Election 7 May 1998
Party	Candidate	Votes	%	±%
Liberal Democrats		500	52.3	
Conservative		456	47.7	
Majority		44	4.6	
Turnout		956	43.0	
Liberal Democrats gain from Conservative		Swing		

Chilworth & Nursling By-Election 25 June 1998
Party	Candidate	Votes	%	±%
Conservative		713	50.9	+15.9
Liberal Democrats		527	37.6	−3.7
Labour		162	11.6	−12.1
Majority		186	13.3	
Turnout		1,402		
Conservative gain from Liberal Democrats		Swing		

=== 1999-2003 ===
Blackwater By-Election 16 December 1999
Party	Candidate	Votes	%	±%
Conservative		1,016	72.8	+14.8
Liberal Democrats		325	23.3	−18.8
Labour		54	3.8	+3.8
Majority		908	49.5	
Turnout		1,395	35.0	
Conservative hold		Swing		

Millway By-Election 16 December 1999
Party	Candidate	Votes	%	±%
Conservative		566	60.7	+9.1
Liberal Democrats		291	31.2	−9.6
Labour		76	8.1	+8.1
Majority		275	29.5	
Turnout		933	14.6	
Conservative hold		Swing		

Harewood By-Election 13 April 2000
Party	Candidate	Votes	%	±%
Conservative		691	54.3	−11.1
Liberal Democrats		554	43.6	+23.0
Labour		27	2.1	−11.9
Majority		137	10.7	
Turnout		1,272	49.1	
Conservative hold		Swing		

Chilworth & Nursling By-Election 7 June 2001
Party	Candidate	Votes	%	±%
Conservative		1,768	45.8	−12.4
Liberal Democrats		1,583	41.0	+17.8
Labour		510	13.2	−5.5
Majority		185	4.8	
Turnout		3,861		
Conservative hold		Swing		

Tedworth By-Election 7 June 2001 (2)
Party	Candidate	Votes	%	±%
Conservative		804		
Conservative		710		
Labour		523		
Labour		422		
Turnout		2,459		
Conservative hold		Swing		

Kings Sombourne and Michelmarsh By-Election 21 February 2002
Party	Candidate	Votes	%	±%
Conservative	Ruth Harper-Adams	465	58.4	+15.9
Liberal Democrats	Alistair Anderson	331	41.6	−8.4
Majority		134	16.8	
Turnout		796	41.0	
Conservative gain from Liberal Democrats		Swing		

Chilworth and Nursling By-Election 30 May 2002
Party	Candidate	Votes	%	±%
Conservative	John Thompson-Hall	1,305	62.5	+4.5
Liberal Democrats	Margaret Huckle	782	37.5	+14.1
Majority		523	25.0	
Turnout		2,087	37.5	
Conservative hold		Swing		

=== 2003-2007 ===
Winton By-Election 16 October 2003
Party	Candidate	Votes	%	±%
Conservative	Christopher Lynn	902	51.4	−4.1
Liberal Democrats	David Metcalf	642	36.6	+11.5
Labour	Alan Cotter	95	5.4	+5.4
UKIP	Anthony McCabe	60	3.4	−4.9
Green	James Todd	56	3.2	−7.9
Majority		260	14.8	
Turnout		1,755	28.6	
Conservative hold		Swing		

Abbey By-Election 25 November 2004
Party	Candidate	Votes	%	±%
Liberal Democrats	Sally Lamb	861	50.5	+21.6
Conservative	John Ray	842	49.4	+16.8
Majority		19	1.1	
Turnout		1,703	47.8	
Liberal Democrats gain from Independent		Swing		

Anna By-Election 3 November 2005
Party	Candidate	Votes	%	±%
Conservative	Andrew Dunnett	658	74.7	+16.2
Liberal Democrats	Kevin O'Leary	176	20.0	−8.8
Labour	Alan Cotter	47	5.3	+5.3
Majority		482	54.7	
Turnout		881	23.0	
Conservative hold		Swing		

Blackwater By-Election 3 November 2005
Party	Candidate	Votes	%	±%
Conservative	Gordon Bailey	959	67.1	−10.4
Liberal Democrats	Peter Thaxter	448	31.4	+9.0
Labour	Keith Morrell	22	1.5	+1.5
Majority		511	35.7	
Turnout		1,429	34.7	
Conservative hold		Swing		

St Mary's By-Election 16 February 2006
Party	Candidate	Votes	%	±%
Conservative	Jan Budzynski	534	44.5	+9.8
Liberal Democrats	Linda Gates	485	40.4	−4.4
Labour	Paul Goddard	182	15.1	−5.4
Majority		49	4.1	
Turnout		1,201	20.4	
Conservative gain from Liberal Democrats		Swing		

=== 2007-2011 ===
Cupernham By-Election 13 December 2007
Party	Candidate	Votes	%	±%
Liberal Democrats	Karen Dunleavey	793	59.8	+4.1
Conservative	Clive Lewis	460	34.7	−9.6
UKIP	Bill McCabe	73	5.5	+5.5
Majority		333	25.1	
Turnout		1,329	33.5	
Liberal Democrats hold		Swing		

Anna By-Election 6 May 2010
Party	Candidate	Votes	%	±%
Conservative	Maureen Flood	1,804	63.5	−0.3
Liberal Democrats	Anthony Evans	836	29.4	+9.9
UKIP	Anthony McCabe	202	7.1	−9.5
Majority		968	34.1	
Turnout		2,842		
Conservative hold		Swing		

=== 2015-2019 ===
Valley Park By-Election 4 May 2017
Party	Candidate	Votes	%	±%
Liberal Democrats	Christopher Thom	1,447	60.0	+6.5
Conservative	Roger Curtis	963	40.0	+4.5
Majority		484	20.0	
Turnout		2,410		
Liberal Democrats hold		Swing		

=== 2019-2023 ===
Andover Millway By-Election 6 May 2021
Party	Candidate	Votes	%	±%
Conservative	Jim Neal	1,246	52.7	+2.6
Liberal Democrats	Robin Hughes	359	15.2	+15.2
Green	Lance Mitchell	259	11.0	+11.0
Labour	Tom Kingsley	251	10.6	+10.6
Andover Independents	Susana Ecclestone	249	10.5	−39.4
Majority		128	5.4	
Turnout		2,364		
Conservative gain from Andover Alliance		Swing		

Andover St Mary's By-Election 6 May 2021
Party	Candidate	Votes	%	±%
Conservative	Jan Budzynski	790	49.2	+22.0
Labour	Andrew Fitchet	439	27.3	+14.6
Liberal Democrats	Nigel Long	377	23.5	+8.8
Majority		351	21.9	
Turnout		1,606		
Conservative gain from Andover Alliance		Swing		

Chilworth, Nursling and Rownhams By-Election 6 May 2021 (2 seats)
Party	Candidate	Votes	%	±%
Conservative	Mike Maltby	1,391	33.3	
Conservative	Terese Swain	1,365	32.7	
Liberal Democrats	Karen Dunleavey	742	17.8	
Liberal Democrats	Andrew Beesley	674	16.2	
Conservative hold		Swing		
Conservative hold		Swing		

North Baddesley By-Election 24 March 2022
Party	Candidate	Votes	%	±%
Liberal Democrats	Geoff Cooper	1,095	63.9	−3.6
Conservative	George McMenemy	618	36.1	+3.6
Majority		477	27.8	
Turnout		1,713		
Liberal Democrats hold		Swing		

Andover Romans By-Election 15 December 2022
Party	Candidate	Votes	%	±%
Liberal Democrats	Jason Sangster	400	57.6	+32.9
Conservative	Katie Brooks	294	42.4	+3.8
Majority		106	15.2	
Turnout		694		
Conservative hold		Swing		
