= 2011 Test Valley Borough Council election =

2011 UK local government election

| ← 2007 | 5 May 2011 | 2015 → |

All 48 seats to Test Valley Borough Council 25 seats needed for a majority
| | First party | Second party |
|---|---|---|
| Party | Conservative | Liberal Democrats |
| Last election | 33 | 15 |
| Seats won | 36 | 12 |
| Seat change | ▲3 | ▼3 |
| Popular vote | 22,598 | 12,607 |
| Percentage | 51.82% | 28.90% |
Council control before election
Conservatives
Council control after election
Conservatives

Elections to Test Valley Borough Council were held on 5 May 2011, the same day as the 2011 United Kingdom Alternative Vote referendum. The Conservatives maintained control of the council, with an increased majority.

== Candidates and results ==
Before the election, the council consisted of 33 Conservatives, 14 Liberal Democrats and 1 Independent.

Only the Conservatives contested all 48 seats. The Liberal Democrats contested 43 seats, while Labour contested 14, the UK Independence Party 7 and the Greens 2. There were also 3 independent candidates. Two wards, Bourne Valley and Over Wallop, were uncontested, meaning the Conservative candidates were elected by default.

Despite all 48 seats being up for election, only three changed hands: The Conservatives gained two seats in Andover, both from the Liberal Democrats, and, in the Abbey Ward of Romsey, defeated Independent Sally Lamb, who had been previously elected as a Liberal Democrat.

Test Valley Borough Council Election, 2011
| Party | Seats | Gains | Losses | Net gain/loss | Seats % | Votes % | Votes | +/− |
|---|---|---|---|---|---|---|---|---|
| Conservative | 36 | 3 | 0 | +3 | 75.00 | 51.82 | 22,598 | ▼2.23 |
| Liberal Democrats | 12 | 0 | 2 | -2 | 25.00 | 28.90 | 12,607 | ▼8.17 |
| Labour | 0 | 0 | 0 | 0 | 0.00 | 10.46 | 4,564 | ▲5.31 |
| UKIP | 0 | 0 | 0 | 0 | 0.00 | 5.74 | 2,506 | ▲2.42 |
| Independent | 0 | 0 | 1 | -1 | 0.00 | 2.13 | 930 | ▲1.75 |
| Green | 0 | 0 | 0 | 0 | 0.00 | 0.92 | 403 | ▲0.92 |
| Total | 48 | | | | | | 43,608 | |

== Ward results ==
=== Abbey ===
Abbey (2)
| Party | Candidate | Votes | % | ±% |
|---|---|---|---|---|
| Conservative | Ian Richards | 1,042 | 42.11 | ▼2.64 |
| Conservative | Clive Collier | 950 | | |
| Independent | Sally Lamb | 673 | 27.20 | ▲27.20 |
| Liberal Democrats | Mike Wenman | 399 | 16.12 | ▼32.89 |
| Labour | Christine Watkins | 360 | 14.55 | ▲14.02 |
| Liberal Democrats | Sandra Cosier | 357 | | |
| Rejected ballots | | 17 | | |
| Turnout | | 2,089 | 54.4% | |
| Conservative gain from Liberal Democrats | | Swing | | |
| Conservative hold | | Swing | | |

=== Alamein ===
Alamein (3)
| Party | Candidate | Votes | % | ±% |
|---|---|---|---|---|
| Conservative | Phil North | 1086 | 47.29 | ▼4.96 |
| Conservative | Janet Whiteley | 993 | | |
| Conservative | Alex Brook | 963 | | |
| Liberal Democrats | Len Gates | 840 | 36.58 | ▼5.27 |
| Liberal Democrats | Kevin Hughes | 796 | 36.9 | |
| Liberal Democrats | Robin Hughes | 739 | 34.2 | |
| Labour | Martin Bell | 370 | 16.11 | ▲8.27 |
| Rejected ballots | | 15 | 0.7 | |
| Turnout | | 2158 | 34.3% | |
| Conservative hold | | Swing | | |
| Conservative hold | | Swing | | |
| Conservative gain from Liberal Democrats | | Swing | | |

=== Ampfield and Braishfield ===
Ampfield and Braishfield
| Party | Candidate | Votes | % | ±% |
|---|---|---|---|---|
| Conservative | Martin Hatley | 806 | 71.39 | ▼9.18 |
| Liberal Democrats | Clive Anderson | 198 | 17.53 | ▲2.06 |
| Labour | David Stevens | 125 | 11.07 | ▲7.13 |
| Majority | | 608 | | |
| Rejected ballots | | 10 | 0.8 | |
| Turnout | | 1,139 | 61.7% | |
| Conservative hold | | Swing | | |

=== Amport ===
Amport
| Party | Candidate | Votes | % | ±% |
|---|---|---|---|---|
| Conservative | Ben Few Brown | 699 | 76.15 | N/A |
| Liberal Democrats | Dominic Mills | 219 | 23.85 | N/A |
| Majority | | 480 | | |
| Rejected ballots | | 49 | 5.1 | |
| Turnout | | 968 | 52.3% | |
| Conservative hold | | Swing | N/A | |

=== Anna ===
Anna (2)
| Party | Candidate | Votes | % | ±% |
|---|---|---|---|---|
| Conservative | Maureen Flood | 1,341 | 63.64 | ▼0.18 |
| Conservative | Graham Stallard | 1,071 | | |
| Liberal Democrats | Ben Harrington-Ellsmore | 394 | 18.69 | ▼0.83 |
| UKIP | Stan Oram | 372 | 17.65 | ▲1.01 |
| Rejected ballots | | 28 | | |
| Turnout | | 1,947 | 52.3% | |
| Conservative hold | | Swing | | |
| Conservative hold | | Swing | | |

=== Blackwater ===
Blackwater (2)
| Party | Candidate | Votes | % | ±% |
|---|---|---|---|---|
| Conservative | Tony Gentle | 1,495 | 69.43 | ▼9.08 |
| Conservative | Gordon Bailey | 1,435 | | |
| Liberal Democrats | Philip Green | 492 | 22.85 | ▲1.37 |
| Liberal Democrats | Mike Curtis | 361 | | |
| Labour | Albert Astbury | 166 | 7.71 | ▲7.71 |
| Rejected ballots | | 16 | | |
| Turnout | | 2,176 | 52,4% | |
| Conservative hold | | Swing | | |
| Conservative hold | | Swing | | |

=== Bourne Valley ===
Bourne Valley
| Party | Candidate | Votes | % | ±% |
|---|---|---|---|---|
| Conservative | Peter Giddings | Unopposed | | |
| Conservative hold | | Swing | | |

=== Broughton and Stockbridge ===
Broughton and Stockbridge (2)
| Party | Candidate | Votes | % | ±% |
|---|---|---|---|---|
| Conservative | Peter Boulton | 1,489 | 67.62 | ▼8.00 |
| Conservative | Daniel Busk | 1,343 | | |
| Liberal Democrats | Jennifer Warren | 495 | 22.47 | ▼1.90 |
| Liberal Democrats | Ed Treadwell | 425 | | |
| Labour | Paul Doran | 218 | 9.90 | ▲9.90 |
| Rejected ballots | | 18 | | |
| Turnout | | 2,181 | 56.3% | |
| Conservative hold | | Swing | | |
| Conservative hold | | Swing | | |

=== Charlton ===
Charlton
| Party | Candidate | Votes | % | ±% |
|---|---|---|---|---|
| Conservative | Ian Carr | 489 | 56.20 | ▼10.78 |
| Liberal Democrats | Michael McGarry | 223 | 25.63 | ▼7.38 |
| UKIP | Norman Woods | 158 | 18.16 | ▲18.16 |
| Majority | | 266 | | |
| Rejected ballots | | 6 | 0.6 | |
| Turnout | | 876 | 54.2% | |
| Conservative hold | | Swing | | |

=== Chilworth, Nursling and Rownhams ===
Chilworth, Nursling and Rownhams (3)
| Party | Candidate | Votes | % | ±% |
|---|---|---|---|---|
| Conservative | Philip Bundy | 1,643 | 62.82 | ▲2.24 |
| Conservative | Nigel Anderdon | 1,639 | | |
| Conservative | Alison Finlay | 1,509 | | |
| Liberal Democrats | Jessica Cosier | 528 | 20.19 | ▼10.22 |
| Liberal Democrats | Judith Houghton | 448 | | |
| Labour | Joan Morrell | 444 | 16.97 | ▲7.97 |
| Liberal Democrats | Paul Thompson | 429 | | |
| Rejected ballots | | 27 | | |
| Turnout | | 2,571 | 48.6% | |
| Conservative hold | | Swing | | |
| Conservative hold | | Swing | | |
| Conservative hold | | Swing | | |

=== Cupernham ===
Cupernham (2)
| Party | Candidate | Votes | % | ±% |
|---|---|---|---|---|
| Liberal Democrats | Dorothy Baverstock | 1,034 | 46.70 | ▼13.47 |
| Liberal Democrats | Karen Dunleavey | 992 | | |
| Conservative | John Ray | 891 | 40.24 | ▲0.42 |
| Conservative | Craig Buckingham | 747 | | |
| Labour | Joss MacDonald | 289 | 13.05 | ▲13.05 |
| Rejected ballots | | 26 | | |
| Turnout | | 2,144 | 53.3% | |
| Liberal Democrats hold | | Swing | | |
| Liberal Democrats hold | | Swing | | |

=== Dun Valley ===
Dun Valley
| Party | Candidate | Votes | % | ±% |
|---|---|---|---|---|
| Conservative | Neville Whiteley | 604 | 67.26 | ▼3.66 |
| Liberal Democrats | Jane Waller | 294 | 32.73 | ▲3.66 |
| Majority | | 310 | | |
| Rejected ballots | | 14 | 1.6 | |
| Turnout | | 912 | 53.2% | |
| Conservative hold | | Swing | | |

=== Harewood ===
Harewood
| Party | Candidate | Votes | % | ±% |
|---|---|---|---|---|
| Conservative | Jim Neal | 670 | 67.13 | N/A |
| Liberal Democrats | Richard Rowles | 328 | 32.86 | N/A |
| Majority | | 324 | | |
| Rejected ballots | | 11 | 1.1 | |
| Turnout | | 1,010 | 55.1% | |
| Conservative hold | | Swing | | |

=== Harroway ===
Harroway (3)
| Party | Candidate | Votes | % | ±% |
|---|---|---|---|---|
| Conservative | Brian Page | 1,206 | 48.33 | ▼2.32 |
| Conservative | Karen Hamilton | 1,193 | | |
| Conservative | Carl Borg-Neal | 1,142 | | |
| Labour | Jonathan Ridge | 487 | 19.51 | ▲2.23 |
| UKIP | Tim Rolt | 429 | 17.19 | ▲5.08 |
| Liberal Democrats | Ryan Hughes | 373 | 14.94 | ▼5.00 |
| Liberal Democrats | Josie Msonthi | 329 | | |
| Liberal Democrats | Andrew Whiteley | 314 | | |
| Rejected ballots | | 23 | | |
| Turnout | | 2,367 | 39.9% | |
| Conservative hold | | Swing | | |
| Conservative hold | | Swing | | |
| Conservative hold | | Swing | | |

=== Kings Somborne and Michelmersh ===
Kings Somborne and Michelmersh
| Party | Candidate | Votes | % | ±% |
|---|---|---|---|---|
| Conservative | Tony Ward | 793 | 71.24 | |
| Liberal Democrats | Julian Gee | 320 | 28.75 | |
| Majority | | 473 | | |
| Rejected ballots | | 18 | 1.6 | |
| Turnout | | 1,136 | 55.5% | |
| Conservative hold | | Swing | | |

=== Millway ===
Millway (3)
| Party | Candidate | Votes | % | ±% |
|---|---|---|---|---|
| Conservative | Zilliah Brooks | 1,486 | 55.73 | ▼1.61 |
| Conservative | Sandra Hawke | 1,321 | | |
| Conservative | Ian Robin | 1,247 | | |
| Liberal Democrats | Ross Fifield | 446 | 16.72 | ▼15.26 |
| Liberal Democrats | Barbara Carpenter | 432 | | |
| Labour | John Newland | 386 | 14.47 | ▲3.80 |
| UKIP | Laurie Manifold | 348 | 13.05 | ▲13.05 |
| Liberal Democrats | Margaret Henstock | 311 | | |
| Rejected ballots | | 10 | | |
| Turnout | | 2,365 | 40.5% | |
| Conservative hold | | Swing | | |
| Conservative hold | | Swing | | |
| Conservative hold | | Swing | | |

=== North Baddesley ===
North Baddesley (3)
| Party | Candidate | Votes | % | ±% |
|---|---|---|---|---|
| Liberal Democrats | Steve Cosier | 1,526 | 54.69 | ▼6.82 |
| Liberal Democrats | Celia Dowden | 1,319 | | |
| Liberal Democrats | Ann Tupper | 1,309 | | |
| Conservative | Richard Eagan | 852 | 30.53 | ▼3.41 |
| Conservative | Ron Brayshaw | 810 | | |
| Conservative | Trevor Coles | 753 | | |
| Labour | Chris Devrell | 412 | 14.76 | ▲10.23 |
| Rejected ballots | | 32 | | |
| Turnout | | 2,722 | 49.2% | |
| Liberal Democrats hold | | Swing | | |
| Liberal Democrats hold | | Swing | | |
| Liberal Democrats hold | | Swing | | |

=== Over Wallop ===
Over Wallop
| Party | Candidate | Votes | % | ±% |
|---|---|---|---|---|
| Conservative | Tony Hope | Unopposed | | |
| Conservative hold | | Swing | | |

=== Penton Bellinger ===
Penton Bellinger (2)
| Party | Candidate | Votes | % | ±% |
|---|---|---|---|---|
| Conservative | Ellie Charnley | 1,272 | 75.94 | ▲0.25 |
| Conservative | Phil Lashbrook | 1,265 | 69.8 | |
| Green | Lance Mitchell | 403 | 24.05 | ▲24.05 |
| Green | Owain Clarke | 288 | 15.9 | |
| Rejected ballots | | 26 | 1.4 | |
| Turnout | | 1,812 | 49.3% | |
| Conservative hold | | Swing | | |
| Conservative hold | | Swing | | |

=== Romsey Extra ===
Romsey Extra (2)
| Party | Candidate | Votes | % | ±% |
|---|---|---|---|---|
| Conservative | Ian Hibberd | 767 | 54.86 | ▲2.7 |
| Conservative | Alison Johnston | 757 | | |
| Liberal Democrats | John Parker | 481 | 34.40 | ▼9.99 |
| Liberal Democrats | Priya Banerjee | 352 | | |
| Labour | Amanda Ford | 150 | 10.72 | ▲7.29 |
| Rejected ballots | | 20 | | |
| Turnout | | 1,365 | 53.9% | |
| Conservative hold | | Swing | | |
| Conservative hold | | Swing | | |

=== St Mary's ===
St Mary's (3)
| Party | Candidate | Votes | % | ±% |
|---|---|---|---|---|
| Conservative | Iris Andersen | 750 | 29.64 | ▼4.77 |
| Liberal Democrats | Katherine Bird | 700 | 27.66 | ▼13.69 |
| Liberal Democrats | Nigel Long | 682 | | |
| Conservative | Katie Brooks | 644 | | |
| Conservative | David Denny | 640 | | |
| Liberal Democrats | Vincent McGarry | 540 | | |
| Labour | Andy Fitchet | 457 | 18.06 | ▲4.77 |
| UKIP | Anthony McCabe | 366 | 14.46 | ▼3.53 |
| Independent | Donald MacDonald | 257 | 10.15 | ▲10.15 |
| Independent | Peter Mather | 250 | | |
| Rejected ballots | | 11 | | |
| Turnout | | 2,086 | 34.6% | |
| Conservative gain from Liberal Democrats | | Swing | | |
| Liberal Democrats hold | | Swing | | |
| Liberal Democrats hold | | Swing | | |

=== Tadburn ===
Tadburn (2)
| Party | Candidate | Votes | % | ±% |
|---|---|---|---|---|
| Liberal Democrats | Mark Cooper | 1,277 | 52.46 | ▲1.02 |
| Liberal Democrats | Peter Hurst | 1,014 | | |
| Conservative | Nick Michell | 895 | 36.77 | ▼6.83 |
| Conservative | Jill Gethin | 893 | | |
| Labour | Carolyn Nixson | 262 | 10.76 | ▲5.82 |
| Rejected ballots | | 16 | | |
| Turnout | | 2,347 | 56.7% | |
| Liberal Democrats hold | | Swing | | |
| Liberal Democrats hold | | Swing | | |

=== Valley Park ===
Valley Park (3)
| Party | Candidate | Votes | % | ±% |
|---|---|---|---|---|
| Liberal Democrats | Alan Dowden | 1,590 | 61.15 | ▲1.69 |
| Liberal Democrats | Andrew Beesley | 1,368 | | |
| Liberal Democrats | Kath Tilling | 1,337 | | |
| Conservative | John Barton | 1,010 | 38.84 | ▼1.69 |
| Conservative | Jane Johnson | 916 | | |
| Conservative | Roger Curtis | 912 | | |
| Rejected ballots | | 36 | | |
| Turnout | | 2,859 | 49.5% | |
| Liberal Democrats hold | | Swing | | |
| Liberal Democrats hold | | Swing | | |
| Liberal Democrats hold | | Swing | | |

=== Winton ===
Winton (3)
| Party | Candidate | Votes | % | ±% |
|---|---|---|---|---|
| Conservative | Chris Lynn | 1,307 | 43.16 | ▼5.07 |
| Conservative | Jan Budzynski | 1,020 | | |
| Conservative | Jan Lovell | 1,004 | | |
| Liberal Democrats | Dave Campbell | 669 | 22.09 | ▼6.8 |
| UKIP | Peter Sumner | 614 | 20.27 | ▲10.64 |
| Liberal Democrats | Sid Dajani | 547 | | |
| Liberal Democrats | Peter Wilson | 547 | | |
| UKIP | Bill McCabe | 537 | | |
| Labour | Adam Jones | 438 | 14.46 | ▲6.54 |
| Rejected ballots | | 24 | | |
| Turnout | | 2,668 | 43.0% | |
| Conservative hold | | Swing | | |
| Conservative hold | | Swing | | |
| Conservative hold | | Swing | | |
