= 2023 Test Valley Borough Council election =

2023 local government election

- 4 May 2023

All 43 seats to Test Valley Borough Council 22 seats needed for a majority

| | First party | Second party |
|---|---|---|
| Leader | Phil North | Neil Gwynne |
| Party | Conservative | Liberal Democrats |
| Last election | 24 | 12 |
| Seats won | 26 | 17 |
| Seat change | ▲2 | ▲5 |
| Popular vote | 14,896 | 15,966 |
| Percentage | 39.6% | 42.4% |
| Swing | ▼2.8pp | ▲13.0pp |
Leader before election
Phil North
Conservative
Leader after election
Phil North
Conservative

The 2023 Test Valley Borough Council election took place on 4 May 2023 to elect members of Test Valley Borough Council in England. This was on the same day as other local elections. The whole council of 43 members was up for election across 20 wards.

== Background ==
At the previous election in 2019 the localist group the Andover Alliance won seven seats on the Council. However, from the beginning of their terms of office they were plagued by internal disputes and defections and they ceased to exist as a group prior to the 2023 election. As a consequence they did not field any candidates at this election, although some of their councillors chose to stand as independents. None were successful.

The Conservatives proved to be the beneficiaries of the Andover Alliance's collapse gaining all seven of their seats. Although they lost five seats to the Liberal Democrats they were able to retain control of the Council.

== Results summary ==
2023 Test Valley District Council election
| Party | Candidates | Seats | Gains | Losses | Net gain/loss | Seats % | Votes % | Votes | +/− |
|---|---|---|---|---|---|---|---|---|---|
| Conservative | 43 | 26 | 7 | 5 | ▲2 | 60.5 | 39.57 | 14,896 | ▼2.81 |
| Liberal Democrats | 43 | 17 | 5 | 0 | ▲5 | 39.5 | 42.41 | 15,966 | ▲12.97 |
| Independent | 9 | 0 | 0 | 0 | Steady | 0.0 | 6.02 | 2,265 | ▲2.52 |
| Labour | 10 | 0 | 0 | 0 | Steady | 0.0 | 6.48 | 2,441 | ▼2.12 |
| Green | 8 | 0 | 0 | 0 | Steady | 0.0 | 5.19 | 1,955 | ▲4.69 |
| UKIP | 1 | 0 | 0 | 0 | Steady | 0.0 | 0.13 | 49 | ▼0.27 |
| Heritage | 1 | 0 | 0 | 0 | Steady | 0.0 | 0.19 | 71 | ▲0.19 |
| Andover Alliance | 0 | 0 | 0 | 7 | ▼7 | 0.0 | 0.00 | 0 | ▼15.18 |

Party vote totals in the table are the sum of each party's highest-polling candidate in each ward.

== Ward results ==
Test Valley Borough Council election results.

Sitting councillors are marked with an asterisk (*).

=== Ampfield and Braishfield ===
Ampfield and Braishfield
| Party | Candidate | Votes | % | ±% |
|---|---|---|---|---|
| Liberal Democrats | Sally Yalden | 614 | 62.0 | +20.6 |
| Conservative | Mary-Jane Rawson-Smith | 376 | 38.0 | −16.4 |
| Majority | | 238 | 24.0 | N/A |
| Turnout | | 995 | 45.00 | −0.8 |
| Rejected ballots | | 5 | 0.5 | |
| Registered electors | | 2,209 | | |
| Liberal Democrats gain from Conservative | | Swing | 18.5 | |

=== Andover Downlands ===
Andover Downlands (2)
| Party | Candidate | Votes | % | ±% |
|---|---|---|---|---|
| Conservative | Christopher Donnelly* | 526 | 57.1 | +7.5 |
| Conservative | Nick Lodge* | 451 | 49.0 | +1.3 |
| Liberal Democrats | Kevin Hughes | 261 | 28.3 | N/A |
| Labour | Kristian Cotter | 200 | 21.7 | +7.8 |
| Liberal Democrats | Colin Burgess | 192 | 20.8 | N/A |
| Turnout | | 929 | 20.66 | −5.3 |
| Rejected ballots | | 8 | 0.9 | |
| Registered electors | | 4,497 | | |
| Conservative hold | | | | |
| Conservative hold | | | | |

=== Andover Harroway ===
Andover Harroway (3)
| Party | Candidate | Votes | % | ±% |
|---|---|---|---|---|
| Liberal Democrats | Luigi Gregori | 781 | 42.1 | +17.7 |
| Liberal Democrats | Robin Hughes | 716 | 38.6 | +14.7 |
| Conservative | Carl Borg-Neal* | 652 | 35.1 | +3.7 |
| Conservative | Tony Burley* | 645 | 34.8 | +5.4 |
| Conservative | Karen Hamilton* | 642 | 34.6 | +3.2 |
| Liberal Democrats | Edward Reynolds | 581 | 31.3 | +12.0 |
| Green | Lance Mitchell | 309 | 16.7 | N/A |
| Labour | Philippa Roll | 295 | 15.9 | −1.9 |
| Independent | Gary Juliff | 248 | 13.4 | N/A |
| Turnout | | 1,866 | 25.61 | −3.7 |
| Rejected ballots | | 11 | 0.6 | |
| Registered electors | | 7,286 | | |
| Liberal Democrats gain from Conservative | | | | |
| Liberal Democrats gain from Conservative | | | | |
| Conservative hold | | | | |

=== Andover Millway ===
Andover Millway (3)
| Party | Candidate | Votes | % | ±% |
|---|---|---|---|---|
| Conservative | Zilliah Brooks* | 936 | 42.9 | −6.3 |
| Conservative | Jim Neal | 794 | 36.4 | −5.3 |
| Conservative | Mark Leech | 770 | 35.3 | −7.8 |
| Liberal Democrats | Thomas Gregory | 756 | 34.6 | N/A |
| Liberal Democrats | Michael McGarry | 698 | 32.0 | N/A |
| Liberal Democrats | Nicholas Simmonds | 529 | 24.2 | N/A |
| Green | Catherine Hosen | 424 | 19.4 | N/A |
| Independent | Mark Farren | 421 | 19.3 | N/A |
| Green | Andy Pomphrey | 369 | 16.9 | N/A |
| Independent | Dan Emmerson | 233 | 10.7 | N/A |
| Turnout | | 2,190 | 32.39 | −0.5 |
| Rejected ballots | | 7 | 0.3 | |
| Registered electors | | 6,761 | | |
| Conservative hold | | | | |
| Conservative gain from Andover Alliance | | | | |
| Conservative gain from Andover Alliance | | | | |

=== Andover Romans ===
Andover Romans (3)
| Party | Candidate | Votes | % | ±% |
|---|---|---|---|---|
| Liberal Democrats | Jason Sangster* | 659 | 41.9 | +15.7 |
| Conservative | Katie Brooks | 577 | 36.7 | −3.1 |
| Conservative | Kirsty North* | 557 | 35.4 | −5.6 |
| Liberal Democrats | Josephine Msonthi | 554 | 35.2 | +12.3 |
| Liberal Democrats | Richard Kidd | 549 | 34.9 | +14.1 |
| Conservative | Tracey Tasker* | 540 | 34.4 | −3.5 |
| Independent | Steve Hardstaff | 364 | 23.2 | N/A |
| Labour | Scott Lindfield | 290 | 18.4 | +4.2 |
| Turnout | | 1,580 | 21.48 | −5.2 |
| Rejected ballots | | 8 | 0.5 | |
| Registered electors | | 7,357 | | |
| Liberal Democrats gain from Conservative | | | | |
| Conservative hold | | | | |
| Conservative hold | | | | |

=== Andover St Mary's ===
Andover St Mary's (3)
| Party | Candidate | Votes | % | ±% |
|---|---|---|---|---|
| Conservative | Iris Andersen* | 676 | 48.7 | +13.9 |
| Conservative | Debbie Cattell | 538 | 38.8 | +11.6 |
| Conservative | Jan Budzynski | 504 | 36.3 | +11.6 |
| Labour | Andrew Fitchet | 479 | 34.5 | +18.3 |
| Liberal Democrats | Katherine Bird | 457 | 32.9 | +14.1 |
| Labour | Judith Cole | 426 | 30.7 | N/A |
| Independent | Stuart Waue | 306 | 22.1 | N/A |
| Liberal Democrats | Andrew Briggs | 206 | 14.9 | N/A |
| Liberal Democrats | Peter Hurst | 200 | 14.4 | N/A |
| Turnout | | 1,393 | 23.32 | −4.3 |
| Rejected ballots | | 6 | 0.4 | |
| Registered electors | | 5,974 | | |
| Conservative hold | | | | |
| Conservative gain from Andover Alliance | | | | |
| Conservative gain from Andover Alliance | | | | |

=== Andover Winton ===
Andover Winton (2)
| Party | Candidate | Votes | % | ±% |
|---|---|---|---|---|
| Conservative | Alex Gillies | 645 | 45.8 | −0.6 |
| Conservative | Lisa Matthews | 552 | 39.2 | −2.6 |
| Liberal Democrats | Joseph Hughes | 410 | 29.1 | N/A |
| Liberal Democrats | Adrian Hall-Cooper | 330 | 23.4 | N/A |
| Independent | Rebecca Meyer* | 283 | 20.1 | −30.1 |
| Independent | Andrew Horsnell | 195 | 13.8 | N/A |
| Independent | Richard Rowles* | 161 | 11.4 | −37.2 |
| Turnout | | 1,424 | 29.44 | −1.5 |
| Rejected ballots | | 16 | 1.1 | |
| Registered electors | | 4,837 | | |
| Conservative gain from Andover Alliance | | | | |
| Conservative gain from Andover Alliance | | | | |

=== Anna ===
Anna (2)
| Party | Candidate | Votes | % | ±% |
|---|---|---|---|---|
| Conservative | Maureen Flood* | 1,373 | 69.3 | +11.9 |
| Conservative | Susanne Hasselmann | 1,102 | 55.7 | +10.9 |
| Liberal Democrats | Paul Burnage | 454 | 22.9 | N/A |
| Liberal Democrats | Christopher Thom | 387 | 19.5 | N/A |
| Green | Carol Bartholomew | 360 | 18.2 | N/A |
| Turnout | | 1,988 | 40.30 | −2.6 |
| Rejected ballots | | 8 | 0.4 | |
| Registered electors | | 4,933 | | |
| Conservative hold | | | | |
| Conservative gain from Andover Alliance | | | | |

- Christopher Thom was a member for Valley Park ward in the previous council term.

=== Bellinger ===
Bellinger
| Party | Candidate | Votes | % | ±% |
|---|---|---|---|---|
| Conservative | Phil Lashbrook* | 531 | 66.5 | +66.5 |
| Liberal Democrats | George Johnson | 268 | 33.5 | N/A |
| Majority | | 263 | 33.0 | N/A |
| Turnout | | 808 | 31.39 | N/A |
| Rejected ballots | | 9 | 1.1 | |
| Registered electors | | 2,574 | | |
| Conservative hold | | Swing | N/A | |

=== Blackwater ===
Blackwater (2)
| Party | Candidate | Votes | % | ±% |
|---|---|---|---|---|
| Conservative | Nick Adams-King* | 1,465 | 66.4 | +3.1 |
| Conservative | Gordon Bailey* | 969 | 43.9 | −15.2 |
| Liberal Democrats | Thomas Ezard | 858 | 38.9 | N/A |
| Independent | Christopher Craig | 643 | 29.1 | +6.4 |
| Green | Jason Reeves | 294 | 13.3 | N/A |
| Liberal Democrats | Andrew Beesley | 293 | 13.3 | N/A |
| Turnout | | 2,213 | 43.83 | +3.8 |
| Rejected ballots | | 7 | 0.3 | |
| Registered electors | | 5,049 | | |
| Conservative hold | | | | |
| Conservative hold | | | | |

=== Bourne Valley ===
Bourne Valley
| Party | Candidate | Votes | % | ±% |
|---|---|---|---|---|
| Conservative | Phil North* | 576 | 64.4 | +64.4 |
| Liberal Democrats | Graham Walters | 318 | 35.6 | N/A |
| Majority | | 255 | 28.6 | N/A |
| Turnout | | 902 | 36.59 | N/A |
| Rejected ballots | | 8 | 0.9 | |
| Registered electors | | 2,465 | | |
| Conservative hold | | Swing | N/A | |

=== Charlton and the Pentons ===
Charlton and the Pentons
| Party | Candidate | Votes | % | ±% |
|---|---|---|---|---|
| Conservative | Linda Lashbrook* | 429 | 48.0 | −3.0 |
| Liberal Democrats | Jean Reynolds | 253 | 28.3 | N/A |
| Green | Paul Howland | 163 | 18.2 | +1.2 |
| UKIP | Norman Woods | 49 | 5.5 | −7.8 |
| Majority | | 176 | 19.7 | −12.7 |
| Turnout | | 897 | 34.42 | +2.0 |
| Rejected ballots | | 3 | 0.3 | |
| Registered electors | | 2,606 | | |
| Conservative hold | | Swing | N/A | |

=== Chilworth, Nursling and Rownhams ===
Chilworth, Nursling and Rownhams (3)
| Party | Candidate | Votes | % | ±% |
|---|---|---|---|---|
| Liberal Democrats | Karen Dunleavey | 1,190 | 50.7 | +20.4 |
| Conservative | Phil Bundy* | 1,144 | 48.8 | −9.9 |
| Conservative | Terese Swain | 1,091 | 46.5 | −9.0 |
| Liberal Democrats | Lee Berry | 1,060 | 45.2 | +19.6 |
| Liberal Democrats | Julie Gomer | 1,048 | 44.7 | +21.5 |
| Conservative | Mike Maltby | 1,037 | 44.2 | −10.9 |
| Turnout | | 2,363 | 35.89 | +1.3 |
| Rejected ballots | | 18 | 0.8 | |
| Registered electors | | 6,584 | | |
| Liberal Democrats gain from Conservative | | | | |
| Conservative hold | | | | |
| Conservative hold | | | | |

=== Harewood ===
Harewood
| Party | Candidate | Votes | % | ±% |
|---|---|---|---|---|
| Conservative | David Drew* | 652 | 52.0 | −15.6 |
| Liberal Democrats | Duncan Clark | 601 | 48.0 | N/A |
| Majority | | 51 | 4.0 | −31.3 |
| Turnout | | 1,259 | 48.10 | +5.0 |
| Rejected ballots | | 6 | 0.5 | |
| Registered electors | | 2,616 | | |
| Conservative hold | | Swing | N/A | |

=== Mid Test ===
Mid Test (3)
| Party | Candidate | Votes | % | ±% |
|---|---|---|---|---|
| Conservative | Alison Johnston* | 1,402 | 47.8 | −7.2 |
| Conservative | Ian Jeffrey* | 1,382 | 47.1 | −11.9 |
| Conservative | Stewart MacDonald | 1,351 | 46.0 | −13.8 |
| Liberal Democrats | David Hall | 1,225 | 41.7 | +6.5 |
| Liberal Democrats | Alan Marshall | 972 | 33.1 | +1.3 |
| Liberal Democrats | Russell Theron | 897 | 30.6 | N/A |
| Green | Connor Shaw | 405 | 13.8 | N/A |
| Green | Jonathan Cotterell | 368 | 12.5 | N/A |
| Labour | Jane Elliott | 256 | 8.7 | −8.4 |
| Turnout | | 2,952 | 40.88 | +5.5 |
| Rejected ballots | | 16 | 0.5 | |
| Registered electors | | 7,221 | | |
| Conservative hold | | | | |
| Conservative hold | | | | |
| Conservative hold | | | | |

=== North Baddesley ===
North Baddesley (3)
| Party | Candidate | Votes | % | ±% |
|---|---|---|---|---|
| Liberal Democrats | Amanda Ford | 1,373 | 70.1 | +1.5 |
| Liberal Democrats | Geoff Cooper* | 1,239 | 63.2 | +3.5 |
| Liberal Democrats | Alan Warnes* | 1,198 | 61.2 | −6.3 |
| Conservative | Lynne Colton | 513 | 26.2 | −6.8 |
| Conservative | Joe Billett | 483 | 24.7 | −1.4 |
| Conservative | Richard Franke | 416 | 21.2 | −0.5 |
| Labour | Callum Jackson | 227 | 11.6 | N/A |
| Turnout | | 1,975 | 34.23 | +0.7 |
| Rejected ballots | | 16 | 0.8 | |
| Registered electors | | 5,769 | | |
| Liberal Democrats hold | | | | |
| Liberal Democrats hold | | | | |
| Liberal Democrats hold | | | | |

=== Romsey Abbey ===
Romsey Abbey (2)
| Party | Candidate | Votes | % | ±% |
|---|---|---|---|---|
| Liberal Democrats | Sandra Gidley* | 1,132 | 57.0 | −6.0 |
| Liberal Democrats | Nik Daas* | 1,017 | 51.2 | −1.5 |
| Conservative | Nick Michell | 704 | 35.5 | +1.1 |
| Conservative | Joe Dwyer | 642 | 32.3 | +1.0 |
| Labour | Bernard Van Den Berg | 167 | 8.4 | −0.1 |
| Heritage | Andrew Peterson | 71 | 3.6 | N/A |
| Turnout | | 1,996 | 41.79 | −3.9 |
| Rejected ballots | | 11 | 0.6 | |
| Registered electors | | 4,776 | | |
| Liberal Democrats hold | | | | |
| Liberal Democrats hold | | | | |

=== Romsey Cupernham ===
Romsey Cupernham (3)
| Party | Candidate | Votes | % | ±% |
|---|---|---|---|---|
| Liberal Democrats | Janet Burnage* | 1,435 | 60.9 | +12.7 |
| Liberal Democrats | Neil Gwynne* | 1,327 | 56.3 | +14.4 |
| Liberal Democrats | Rohit Kohli | 1,187 | 50.3 | −5.2 |
| Conservative | Tim Mayer | 869 | 36.9 | +4.7 |
| Conservative | John Ray | 768 | 32.6 | −3.5 |
| Conservative | Dave Maslen | 664 | 28.2 | −2.2 |
| Labour | Ann Chillingworth | 326 | 13.8 | +4.4 |
| Turnout | | 2,370 | 36.36 | −1.5 |
| Rejected ballots | | 12 | 0.5 | |
| Registered electors | | 6,519 | | |
| Liberal Democrats hold | | | | |
| Liberal Democrats hold | | | | |
| Liberal Democrats hold | | | | |

=== Romsey Tadburn ===
Romsey Tadburn (2)
| Party | Candidate | Votes | % | ±% |
|---|---|---|---|---|
| Liberal Democrats | Mark Cooper* | 1,463 | 73.3 | +8.4 |
| Liberal Democrats | John Parker* | 1,304 | 65.3 | +11.4 |
| Conservative | Clive Collier | 494 | 24.7 | −8.1 |
| Conservative | David Bloomfield | 410 | 20.5 | −8.7 |
| Labour | Carolyn Nixson | 201 | 10.1 | +0.4 |
| Turnout | | 2,005 | 43.43 | −0.6 |
| Rejected ballots | | 9 | 0.4 | |
| Registered electors | | 4,617 | | |
| Liberal Democrats hold | | | | |
| Liberal Democrats hold | | | | |

=== Valley Park ===
Valley Park (2)
| Party | Candidate | Votes | % | ±% |
|---|---|---|---|---|
| Liberal Democrats | Alan Dowden* | 1,458 | 80.9 | +3.1 |
| Liberal Democrats | Celia Dowden** | 1,297 | 72.0 | +10.9 |
| Conservative | Michael Ball | 356 | 19.8 | −1.7 |
| Conservative | Sam Davies | 330 | 18.3 | −1.6 |
| Turnout | | 1,811 | 39.05 | −2.3 |
| Rejected ballots | | 9 | 0.5 | |
| Registered electors | | 4,638 | | |
| Liberal Democrats hold | | | | |
| Liberal Democrats hold | | | | |

- Celia Dowden was a member for North Baddesley ward in the previous council term.

== Changes 2023–2027 ==
- Katie Brooks (Andover Romans), elected as a Conservative, left the party in July 2025 to sit as an independent.
- Amanda Ford (North Baddesley), elected as a Liberal Democrat, left the party in June 2026 to sit as an independent.
