= 2007 Test Valley Borough Council election =

2007 UK local government election

← 2003	3 May 2007	2011 →

All 48 seats to Test Valley Borough Council 25 seats needed for a majority
	First party	Second party
Party	Conservative	Liberal Democrats
Last election	30	16
Seats won	33	15
Seat change	▲3	▼1
Popular vote	18,669	12,804
Percentage	54.05%	37.07%
Council control before election
Conservatives
Council control after election
Conservatives

The 2007 Test Valley Borough Council election took place on the 3 May 2007. All 48 seats were up for election. 25 seats were needed for a majority, with the Conservatives increasing their majority by three seats. Both independents lost their seats, one to the Conservatives and one to the Liberal Democrats, who in turn lost a seat to the Conservatives.

== Results summary ==
Test Valley Borough Council Election, 2007
Party	Seats	Gains	Losses	Net gain/loss	Seats %	Votes %	Votes	+/−
Conservative	33	3	0	▲3	68.75	54.05	18,669	▲1.85
Liberal Democrats	15	1	2	▼1	31.25	37.07	12,804	▲1.12
Labour	0	0	0	Steady	0.00	5.15	1,781	▼0.25
UKIP	0	0	0	Steady	0.00	3.32	1,148	▲0.75
Independent	0	0	2	▼2	0.00	0.38	846	▼3.08
Total	48						34,536	

== Ward results ==
=== Abbey ===
Abbey (2)
Party	Candidate	Votes	%	±%
Liberal Democrats	Sally Lamb	944	49.01	▲20.16
Conservative	Clive Collier	862	44.75	▲12.2
Conservative	Mark Bramley	782		
Liberal Democrats	Sandra Rispin	781		
Labour	Sandra Smith	120	6.23	▲0.53
Majority				
Turnout		1,926		
Liberal Democrats gain from Independent		Swing		
Conservative hold		Swing		

=== Alamein ===
Alamein (3)
Party	Candidate	Votes	%	±%
Conservative	Phil North	793	42.33	▲4.17
Liberal Democrats	Len Gates	784	41.85	▼6.64
Conservative	Janet Whiteley	772		
Liberal Democrats	Robin Hughes	767		
Conservative	Karen Hamilton	733		
Liberal Democrats	Josephine Msonthi	689		
UKIP	Anthony McCabe	149	7.95	▼5.39
Labour	Alan Cotter	147	7.84	▲7.84
Majority				
Conservative gain from Liberal Democrats		Swing		
Liberal Democrats hold		Swing		
Conservative gain from Liberal Democrats		Swing		

=== Ampfield and Braishfield ===
Ampfield and Braishfield
Party	Candidate	Votes	%	±%
Conservative	Martin Hatley	755	80.57	▲2.38
Liberal Democrats	Clive Anderson	145	15.47	▼6.33
Labour	David Stevens	37	3.94	▲3.94
Majority		610	65.10	▲8.72
Conservative hold		Swing		

=== Amport ===
Amport
Party	Candidate	Votes	%	±%
Conservative	Tim Southern	Unopposed		
Conservative hold		Swing		

=== Anna ===
Anna (2)
Party	Candidate	Votes	%	±%
Conservative	Arthur Peters	1,085	63.82	▲5.33
Conservative	Graham Stallard	1,007		
Liberal Democrats	Tony Evans	332	19.52	▼9.25
Liberal Democrats	Rosalie Sweetman	304		
UKIP	Stan Oram	283	16.64	▲3.92
Majority				
Turnout		1,700		
Conservative hold		Swing		
Conservative hold		Swing		

=== Blackwater ===
Blackwater (2)
Party	Candidate	Votes	%	±%
Conservative	Tony Gentle	1,396	78.51	▲1.02
Conservative	Gordon Bailey	1,333		
Liberal Democrats	Robert Sims	382	21.48	▼1.02
Liberal Democrats	Mike Curtis	372		
Majority				
Turnout		1,778		
Conservative hold		Swing		
Conservative hold		Swing		

=== Bourne Valley ===
Bourne Valley
Party	Candidate	Votes	%	±%
Conservative	Peter Giddings	622	81.20	▲7.27
Liberal Democrats	Ryan Hughes	144	18.79	▼7.27
Majority				
Turnout		766		
Conservative hold		Swing		

=== Broughton and Stockbridge ===
Broughton and Stockbridge (2)
Party	Candidate	Votes	%	±%
Conservative	Peter Boulton	1,331	75.62	▲16.57
Conservative	Daniel Busk	1,248		
Liberal Democrats	Robert Sims	429	24.37	▼9.53
Liberal Democrats	David Johnson	396		
Majority				
Turnout		1,760		
Conservative hold		Swing		
Conservative hold		Swing		

=== Charlton ===
Charlton
Party	Candidate	Votes	%	±%
Conservative	Ian Carr	487	66.98	▼10.23
Liberal Democrats	Garry Whittam	240	33.01	▲10.23
Majority				
Turnout		727		
Conservative hold		Swing		

=== Chilworth, Nursling and Rownhams ===
Chilworth, Nursling and Rownhams (3)
Party	Candidate	Votes	%	±%
Conservative	Nigel Anderdon	1,225	60.58	▲0.76
Conservative	Philip Bundy	1,190		
Conservative	Alison Finlay	1,099		
Liberal Democrats	Brian Richards	615	30.41	▲4.16
Liberal Democrats	Sandra Cosier	586		
Liberal Democrats	Max Buckmaster	544		
Labour	Albert Astbury	182	9.00	▼4.92
Majority				
Conservative hold		Swing		
Conservative hold		Swing		
Conservative hold		Swing		

=== Cupernham ===
Cupernham (2)
Party	Candidate	Votes	%	±%
Liberal Democrats	Dorothy Baverstock	1,331	60.17	▲1.94
Liberal Democrats	Alan Marsh	881	39.82	▼1.94
Conservative	John Ray	745	44.34	
Conservative	Iain Bell	705		
Majority				
Turnout		1,680		
Liberal Democrats hold		Swing		
Liberal Democrats hold		Swing		

=== Dun Valley ===
Dun Valley
Party	Candidate	Votes	%	±%
Conservative	Neville Whiteley	588	70.92	▲3.98
Liberal Democrats	Judith Houghton	241	29.07	▼3.98
Majority				
Turnout		347	41.85	
Conservative hold		Swing		

=== Harewood ===
Harewood
Party	Candidate	Votes	%	±%
Conservative	Jim Neal	Unopposed		
Conservative hold		Swing		

=== Harroway ===
Harroway (3)
Party	Candidate	Votes	%	±%
Conservative	Brian Page	1,049	50.65	▼3.42
Conservative	Jan Lovell	1,010		
Conservative	Carl Borg-Neal	984		
Liberal Democrats	Alan Sweetman	413	19.94	▲4.22
Liberal Democrats	Peter Wilson	395		
Labour	Sarah Evans	358	17.28	▼4.47
Liberal Democrats	Ed Treadwell	324		
UKIP	Emily Blatchford	251	12.11	▲12.11
UKIP	Derek Rumsey			
Majority				
Conservative hold		Swing		
Conservative hold		Swing		
Conservative hold		Swing		

=== Kings Somborne and Michelmersh ===
Kings Somborne and Michelmersh
Party	Candidate	Votes	%	±%
Conservative	Tony Ward	Unopposed		
Conservative gain from Independent		Swing		

=== Millway ===
Millway (3)
Party	Candidate	Votes	%	±%
Conservative	Zilliah Brooks	1,160	57.34	▼13.76
Conservative	Sandra Hawke	1,147		
Conservative	David Drew	1,129		
Liberal Democrats	Alan Sweetman	647	31.98	▲3.09
Liberal Democrats	Margaret Henstock	604		
Liberal Democrats	Maureen Treadwell	566		
Labour	John Newland	216	10.67	▲10.67
Majority		513	25.35	
Conservative hold		Swing		
Conservative hold		Swing		
Conservative hold		Swing		

=== North Baddesley ===
North Baddesley (3)
Party	Candidate	Votes	%	±%
Liberal Democrats	Stephen Cosier	1,466	61.51	▼4.34
Liberal Democrats	Celia Dowden	1,304		
Liberal Democrats	Ann Tupper	1,221		
Conservative	Robin Oliver	809	33.94	▲5.16
Conservative	Mike Draper	638		
Conservative	Andrew Gibson	637		
Labour	David Moran	108	4.53	▼0.83
Labour	Khalid Farooq	95		
Majority		657	27.57	
Liberal Democrats hold		Swing		
Liberal Democrats hold		Swing		
Liberal Democrats hold		Swing		

=== Over Wallop ===
Over Wallop
Party	Candidate	Votes	%	±%
Conservative	Tony Hope	329	63.14	▼14.34
Liberal Democrats	Jane Fisk	192	36.85	▲14.34
Majority		137	26.29	
Turnout		521		
Conservative hold		Swing		

=== Penton Bellinger ===
Penton Bellinger (2)
Party	Candidate	Votes	%	±%
Conservative	Phil Lashbrook	1,034	75.69	▲19.49
Conservative	Ellie Charnley	1,013		
Liberal Democrats	Lance Mitchell	332	24.30	▼1.97
Liberal Democrats	Kevin O'Leary	238		
Majority		702	51.39	
Turnout		1,366		
Conservative hold		Swing		
Conservative hold		Swing		

=== Romsey Extra ===
Romsey Extra (2)
Party	Candidate	Votes	%	±%
Conservative	Caroline Nokes	638	52.16	▼1.66
Conservative	Ian Hibberd	571		
Liberal Democrats	Karen Dunleavey	543	44.39	▼1.78
Liberal Democrats	John Burgess	304	5.15	
Labour	Ian Paxton	42	3.43	▲3.43
Majority		95	7.76	
Turnout		1,223		
Conservative hold		Swing		
Conservative hold		Swing		

=== St Mary's ===
St Mary's (3)
Party	Candidate	Votes	%	±%
Liberal Democrats	Rod Bailey	840	41.35	▼3.40
Liberal Democrats	Donald Macdonald	753		
Liberal Democrats	Michael McGarry	719		
Conservative	Jan Budzynski	699	34.41	▼0.30
Conservative	Pam Whitehouse	666		
Conservative	Peter Mather	648		
Labour	Michael Mumford	270	13.29	▼7.24
UKIP	Tim Rolt	222	10.93	▲10.93
Majority		141	6.94	
Liberal Democrats hold		Swing		
Liberal Democrats hold		Swing		
Liberal Democrats hold		Swing		

=== Tadburn ===
Tadburn (2)
Party	Candidate	Votes	%	±%
Liberal Democrats	Mark Cooper	1,050	51.44	▼0.32
Liberal Democrats	Sally Leach	942		
Conservative	Jill Gethin	890	43.60	▲3.68
Conservative	Ian Richards	852		
Labour	Carolyn Nixson	101	4.94	▼3.37
Majority		160	7.83	
Turnout		2,041		
Liberal Democrats hold		Swing		
Liberal Democrats hold		Swing		

=== Valley Park ===
Valley Park (3)
Party	Candidate	Votes	%	±%
Liberal Democrats	Alan Dowden	1,401	59.46	▲1.00
Liberal Democrats	Andrea Dyde	1,293		
Liberal Democrats	Louise Guy	1,268		
Conservative	John Barton	955	40.53	▼6.46
Conservative	Roger Curtis	927		
Conservative	James Jaggers	896		
Majority		446	18.93	
Liberal Democrats hold		Swing		
Liberal Democrats hold		Swing		
Liberal Democrats hold		Swing		

=== Winton ===
Winton (3)
Party	Candidate	Votes	%	±%
Conservative	Marion Kerley	1,217	48.23	▼7.29
Conservative	Chris Lynn	1,188		
Conservative	Pam Mutton	1,105		
Liberal Democrats	David Metcalf	729	28.89	▲3.82
Liberal Democrats	Janet Evans	681		
Liberal Democrats	Vincent McGarry	583		
UKIP	Bill McCabe	243	9.63	▲1.33
Labour	Bronwen McCoy	200	7.92	▲7.92
Independent	John Smith	134	5.31	▲5.31
Majority		488	19.34	
Conservative hold		Swing		
Conservative hold		Swing		
Conservative hold		Swing		
