= 2003 Test Valley Borough Council election =

2003 UK local government election

← 1999	1 May 2003	2007 →

All 48 seats to Test Valley Borough Council 25 seats needed for a majority
	First party	Second party	Third party
Party	Conservative	Liberal Democrats	Independent
Seats won	30	16	2
Popular vote	17,121	11,793	1,138
Percentage	52.20%	35.95%	3.46%
Council control before election
Conservatives
Council control after election
Conservatives

The 2003 Test Valley Borough Council election took place on the 1 May 2003. With new ward boundaries, all 48 seats were up for election. 25 seats were needed for a majority, with the Conservatives winning 30; the Liberal Democrats won 16 seats, and Independents won 2.

== Results summary ==
Test Valley Borough Council Election, 2003
Party	Seats	Gains	Losses	Net gain/loss	Seats %	Votes %	Votes	+/−
Conservative	30				62.50	52.20	17,121	
Liberal Democrats	16				33.33	35.95	11,793	
Labour	0				0.00	5.40	1,648	
Independent	2				4.16	3.46	1,138	
UKIP	0				0.00	2.57	846	
Green	0				0.00	0.76	250	
Total	48						32,796	

== Ward results ==
=== Abbey ===
Abbey (2)
Party	Candidate	Votes	%	±%
Independent	Donald Kemish	773	32.89	
Conservative	Clive Collier	765	32.55	
Liberal Democrats	Sally Lamb	678	28.85	
Liberal Democrats	Paul Rispin	528		
Labour	Charles Damant	134	5.70	
Majority				
Turnout		2,350		
Independent hold		Swing		
Conservative hold		Swing		

=== Alamein ===
Alamein (3)
Party	Candidate	Votes	%	±%
Liberal Democrats	Robin Hughes	596	48.49	
Liberal Democrats	Leonard Gates	543		
Liberal Democrats	Josephine Msonthi	507		
Conservative	Karen Hamilton	469	38.16	
Conservative	Michael Platt	432		
Conservative	Lynsay Scratchley	430		
UKIP	William McCabe	164	13.34	
Majority				
Liberal Democrats win (new seat)				
Liberal Democrats win (new seat)				
Liberal Democrats win (new seat)				

=== Ampfield and Braishfield ===
Ampfield and Braishfield
Party	Candidate	Votes	%	±%
Conservative	Martin Hatley	649	78.19	
Liberal Democrats	Sandra Cosier	181	21.80	
Majority		468	56.38	
Conservative win (new seat)				

=== Amport ===
Amport
Party	Candidate	Votes	%	±%
Conservative	Norman Arnell	467	69.18	
Liberal Democrats	Elizabeth Warner	129	19.11	
UKIP	Dominic Mills	79	11.70	
Majority		338	50.07	
Conservative win (new seat)				

=== Anna ===
Anna (2)
Party	Candidate	Votes	%	±%
Conservative	Elizabeth Townsend	809	58.49	
Conservative	Arthur Peters	767		
Liberal Democrats	John Moon	398	28.77	
Liberal Democrats	Kevin O'Leary	346		
UKIP	Stanley Oram	176	12.72	
Majority				
Turnout		1,383		
Conservative hold		Swing		
Conservative hold		Swing		

=== Blackwater ===
Blackwater (2)
Party	Candidate	Votes	%	±%
Conservative	Anthony Gentle	1,205	77.49	
Conservative	John Lewis	1,024		
Liberal Democrats	Max Buckmaster	350	22.50	
Liberal Democrats	Julian Jones	338		
Majority				
Turnout		1,555		
Conservative hold		Swing		
Conservative hold		Swing		

=== Bourne Valley ===
Bourne Valley
Party	Candidate	Votes	%	±%
Conservative	Anthony Jackson	505	73.93	
Liberal Democrats	David Webb	178	26.06	
Majority		327	47.87	
Conservative win (new seat)				

=== Broughton and Stockbridge ===
Broughton and Stockbridge (2)
Party	Candidate	Votes	%	±%
Conservative	Peter Boulton	1,174	59.05	
Conservative	Daniel Busk	969		
Liberal Democrats	Maureen Treadwell	674	33.90	
Liberal Democrats	Alistair Anderson	634		
Labour	Arthur Paul	140	7.04	
Majority				
Turnout		1,988		
Conservative hold		Swing		
Conservative hold		Swing		

=== Charlton ===
Charlton
Party	Candidate	Votes	%	±%
Conservative	Ian Carr	461	77.21	
Liberal Democrats	Dorothy Webb	136	22.78	
Majority		325	54.43	
Conservative win (new seat)				

=== Chilworth, Nursling and Rownhams ===
Chilworth, Nursling and Rownhams (3)
Party	Candidate	Votes	%	±%
Conservative	John Hall	1,242	59.82	
Conservative	Nigel Anderson	1,230		
Conservative	Bruce Cowan	1,084		
Liberal Democrats	Brian Richards	545	26.25	
Labour	Keith Morrel	289	13.92	
Majority				
Conservative win (new seat)				
Conservative win (new seat)				
Conservative win (new seat)				

=== Cupernham ===
Cupernham (2)
Party	Candidate	Votes	%	±%
Liberal Democrats	Dorothy Baverstock	838	58.23	
Liberal Democrats	Alan Marsh	827		
Conservative	Richard Jenkins	601	41.76	
Conservative	Sarah Whitaker	594		
Majority				
Turnout		1,439		
Liberal Democrats hold		Swing		
Liberal Democrats hold		Swing		

=== Dun Valley ===
Dun Valley
Party	Candidate	Votes	%	±%
Conservative	Neville Whiteley	478	66.94	
Liberal Democrats	Judith Houghton	236	33.05	
Majority		242	33.89	
Conservative win (new seat)				

=== Harewood ===
Harewood
Party	Candidate	Votes	%	±%
Conservative	James Neal	555	74.29	
Liberal Democrats	Edwin Treadwell	192	25.70	
Majority		363	48.59	
Conservative win (new seat)				

=== Harroway ===
Harroway (3)
Party	Candidate	Votes	%	±%
Conservative	Patricia West	875	54.07	
Conservative	Brian Page	777		
Conservative	Carl Borg-Neal	718		
Liberal Democrats	Michael Levitt	391	24.16	
Liberal Democrats	Peter Wilson	384		
Liberal Democrats	Rosalie Sweetman	376		
Labour	Michael Mumford	352	21.75	
Labour	Alan Cotter	279		
Labour	James Lowe	255		
Majority				
Conservative win (new seat)				
Conservative win (new seat)				
Conservative win (new seat)				

=== Kings Somborne and Michelmersh ===
Kings Somborne and Michelmersh
Party	Candidate	Votes	%	±%
Independent	David Bidwell	365	41.95	
Conservative	David Bonnor-Morris	358	41.14	
Liberal Democrats	Roger Harris	147	16.89	
Majority		7	0.80	
Turnout		870		
Independent hold		Swing		

=== Millway ===
Millway (3)
Party	Candidate	Votes	%	±%
Conservative	Zilliah Brooks	1,078	71.10	
Conservative	Sandra Hawke	998		
Conservative	David Drew	989		
Liberal Democrats	Margaret Henstock	438	28.89	
Liberal Democrats	Alan Sweetman	418		
Majority		1,516		
Conservative win (new seat)				
Conservative win (new seat)				
Conservative win (new seat)				

=== North Baddesley ===
North Baddesley (3)
Party	Candidate	Votes	%	±%
Liberal Democrats	Stephen Cosier	1,437	65.85	
Liberal Democrats	Celia Dowden	1,214		
Liberal Democrats	Ann Tupper	1,139		
Conservative	Robin Oliver	628	28.78	
Conservative	Roy Williams	576		
Conservative	Alfred-Hans Monsen	441		
Labour	Christopher Deverell	117	5.36	
Majority				
Liberal Democrats win (new seat)				
Liberal Democrats win (new seat)				
Liberal Democrats win (new seat)				

=== Over Wallop ===
Over Wallop
Party	Candidate	Votes	%	±%
Conservative	Anthony Hope	320	77.48	
Liberal Democrats	Jane Fisk	93	22.51	
Majority		227	54.96	
Conservative win (new seat)				

=== Penton Bellinger ===
Penton Bellinger (2)
Party	Candidate	Votes	%	±%
Conservative	Philip Lashbrook	770	56.20	
Conservative	Timothy Southern	739		
Liberal Democrats	Lance Mitchell	360	26.27	
UKIP	Derek Rumsey	240	17.51	
Majority				
Turnout		1,370		
Conservative hold		Swing		
Conservative hold		Swing		

=== Romsey Extra ===
Romsey Extra (2)
Party	Candidate	Votes	%	±%
Conservative	Caroline Nokes	542	53.82	
Conservative	Ian Hibberd	495		
Liberal Democrats	Karen Dunleavy	465	46.17	
Liberal Democrats	George Johnson	444		
Majority				
Turnout		1,007		
Conservative hold		Swing		
Conservative hold		Swing		

=== St Mary's ===
St Mary's (3)
Party	Candidate	Votes	%	±%
Liberal Democrats	Rodney Bailey	704	44.75	
Liberal Democrats	Barbara Levitt	602		
Liberal Democrats	Donald MacDonald	583		
Conservative	Kenneth Whitehouse	546	34.71	
Conservative	Peter Wood	528		
Conservative	Barry Hodgson	516		
Labour	Paul Goddard	323	20.53	
Labour	Martyn Wilson	276		
Labour	Peter Scarrott	267		
Majority				
Liberal Democrats win (new seat)				
Liberal Democrats win (new seat)				
Liberal Democrats win (new seat)				

=== Tadburn ===
Tadburn (2)
Party	Candidate	Votes	%	±%
Liberal Democrats	Mark Cooper	909	51.76	
Liberal Democrats	Sally Leach	900		
Conservative	Peter Daw	701	39.92	
Conservative	David Willox	635		
Labour	Carolyn Nixson	146	8.31	
Majority				
Liberal Democrats win (new seat)				
Liberal Democrats win (new seat)				

=== Valley Park ===
Valley Park (3)
Party	Candidate	Votes	%	±%
Liberal Democrats	Alan Dowden	1,153	58.46	
Liberal Democrats	Jacquie Shaw	1,023		
Liberal Democrats	Norman Lewis	929		
Conservative	John Barton	672	34.07	
Conservative	Richard James	631		
Conservative	Peggy Humphries	613		
Labour	David Moores	147	7.45	
Labour	Teri Moores	144		
Majority				
Liberal Democrats win (new seat)				
Liberal Democrats win (new seat)				
Liberal Democrats win (new seat)				

=== Winton ===
Winton (3)
Party	Candidate	Votes	%	±%
Conservative	Marion Kerley	1,251	55.52	
Conservative	Pamela Mutton	1,085		
Conservative	Alan Smith	1,061		
Liberal Democrats	David Metcalf	565	25.07	
Liberal Democrats	Yvonne Jones	502		
Liberal Democrats	John Smith	479		
Green	James Todd	250	11.09	
UKIP	Anthony McCabe	187	8.30	
Majority				
Conservative win (new seat)				
Conservative win (new seat)				
Conservative win (new seat)				
