= 2015 Test Valley Borough Council election =

2015 UK local government election

- 7 May 2015

All 48 seats to Test Valley Borough Council 25 seats needed for a majority
	First party	Second party	Third party
Party	Conservative	Liberal Democrats	Independent
Last election	36	12	0
Seats won	38	9	1
Seat change	▲2	▼3	▲1
Popular vote	31,775	15,933	3,317
Percentage	44.30%	22.21%	4.62%
Council control before election
Conservatives
Council control after election
Conservatives

The 2015 Test Valley Borough Council election took place on 7 May 2015 to elect members of the Test Valley Borough Council in England. It was held on the same day as other local elections.

== Results summary ==
Test Valley Borough Council Election, 2015
Party	Seats	Gains	Losses	Net gain/loss	Seats %	Votes %	Votes	+/−
Conservative	38	3	1	▲2	79.16	44.30	31,775	▼12.02
Liberal Democrats	9	0	3	▼3	18.75	37.07	15,933	▼10.54
UKIP	0	0	0	Steady	0.00	15.49	11,114	▲12.19
Labour	0	0	0	Steady	0.00	8.95	6,426	▲3.57
Independent	1	1	0	▲1	2.08	4.62	3,317	▲3.23
Green	0	0	0	Steady	0.00	4.40	3,161	▲3.6
Total	48						34,536	

== Ward results ==
=== Abbey ===
Note that in the previous election, Liberal Democrat candidate Sally Lamb stood as an independent, receiving 27.20% of the vote share.

Abbey (2)
Party	Candidate	Votes	%	±%
Conservative	Ian Richards	1,195	39.12	▼2.99
Conservative	Clive Collier	1,076		
Liberal Democrats	Sally Lamb	865	28.32	▲12.20
Liberal Democrats	John Critchley	716		
UKIP	Paul Welch	335	10.96	▲10.96
Labour	Stuart Bannerman	334	10.93	▼3.62
Green	Lucy Best	325	10.64	▲10.64
Turnout				
Conservative hold		Swing		
Conservative hold		Swing		

=== Alamein ===
Alamein (3)
Party	Candidate	Votes	%	±%
Conservative	Phil North	1,960	40.96	▼6.33
Conservative	Alexander Brook	1,677		
Conservative	Tracey Preston	1,570		
UKIP	Connor Docherty	865	19.66	▲19.66
Liberal Democrats	Len Gates	768	16.05	▼20.53
Liberal Democrats	Robin Hughes	688		
Liberal Democrats	Amy Bower	686		
Labour	Andy Fitchet	648	13.54	▼2.57
Labour	Ben Kinross	569		
Labour	Michael Mumford	504		
Green	Adam Timby	468	9.78	▲9.78
Green	Joshua Cussen	418		
Turnout				
Conservative hold		Swing		
Conservative hold		Swing		
Conservative hold		Swing		

=== Ampfield and Braishfield ===
Ampfield and Braishfield
Party	Candidate	Votes	%	±%
Conservative	Martin Hatley	1,052	69.94	▼1.45
Liberal Democrats	Clive Anderson	314	20.87	▲3.34
Labour	Arthur Stevens	138	9.17	▼1.90
Turnout				
Conservative hold		Swing		

=== Amport ===
Note that Ben Few Brown had been the Conservative incumbent in the previous election

Amport
Party	Candidate	Votes	%	±%
Independent	Ben Few Brown	851	64.17	
UKIP	Christine Forrester	475	35.82	▲35.82
Independent gain from Conservative		Swing		

=== Anna ===
Anna (2)
Party	Candidate	Votes	%	±%
Conservative	Maureen Flood	1,527	71.96	▲8.32
Conservative	Graham Stallard	1,256		
UKIP	Timothy Rolt	299	14.09	▼3.56
Liberal Democrats	Josie Msonthi	296	13.94	▼4.75
Turnout				
Conservative hold		Swing		
Conservative hold		Swing		

=== Blackwater ===
Blackwater (2)
Party	Candidate	Votes	%	±%
Conservative	Gordon Bailey	1,865	54.54	▼14.89
Conservative	Nick Adams-King	1,653		
UKIP	Kim Bigwood	521	15.23	▲15.23
Liberal Democrats	Phil Green	486	14.21	▼8.64
Liberal Democrats	Nik Daas	445		
Green	Gill Tunney	341	9.97	▲9.97
Labour	Peter Sowerby	206	6.02	▼1.69
Turnout				
Conservative hold		Swing		
Conservative hold		Swing		

=== Bourne Valley ===
Bourne Valley
Party	Candidate	Votes	%	±%
Conservative	Peter Giddings	905	70.75	n/a
Liberal Democrats	Linda Gates	204	15.94	n/a
UKIP	William McCabe	170	13.29	
Turnout				
Conservative hold		Swing		

=== Broughton and Stockbridge ===
Broughton and Stockbridge (2)
Party	Candidate	Votes	%	±%
Conservative	Peter Boulton	1,799	49.00	▼18.62
Conservative	Daniel Busk	1,291		
Independent	Harry Paul	1,031	28.08	▲28.08
Liberal Democrats	Ed Treadwell	841	22.90	▲13.00
Turnout				
Conservative hold		Swing		
Conservative hold		Swing		

=== Charlton ===
Charlton
Party	Candidate	Votes	%	±%
Conservative	Ian Carr	670	57.41	▲1.21
UKIP	Norman Woods	293	25.10	▼0.53
Independent	Richard Kidd	204	17.48	▲17.48
Turnout				
Conservative hold		Swing		

=== Chilworth, Nursling and Rownhams ===
Chilworth, Nursling and Rownhams (3)
Party	Candidate	Votes	%	±%
Conservative	Phil Bundy	2,190	49.96	▼12.86
Conservative	Nigel Anderdon	2,074		
Conservative	Alison Finlay	1,931		
Liberal Democrats	Brian Richards	895	20.41	▲0.22
UKIP	Iain Bell	812	18.52	▲18.52
Liberal Democrats	Michael Ward	517		
Labour	Gerald Whitaker	486	11.08	▼5.89
Liberal Democrats	Richard Rowles	462		
Turnout				
Conservative hold		Swing		
Conservative hold		Swing		
Conservative hold		Swing		

=== Cupernham ===
Cupernham (2)
Party	Candidate	Votes	%	±%
Liberal Democrats	Dorothy Baverstock	1,367	46.68	▼0.02
Conservative	John Ray	1,183	40.40	▲0.16
Conservative	Teresa Hibberd	1,148		
Liberal Democrats	Janet Burnage	1,121		
Labour	Stuart Copping	378	12.90	▼0.15
Turnout				
Liberal Democrats hold		Swing		
Conservative gain from Liberal Democrats		Swing		

=== Dun Valley ===
Dun Valley
Party	Candidate	Votes	%	±%
Conservative	Ian Jeffrey	905	67.38	▲0.12
Liberal Democrats	Maureen Treadwell	438	32.61	▼0.12
Turnout				
Conservative hold		Swing		

=== Harewood ===
Harewood
Party	Candidate	Votes	%	±%
Conservative	David Drew	1,086	80.20	▲13.07
Liberal Democrats	Anthony McCabe	268	19.79	▼13.07
Turnout				
Conservative hold		Swing		

=== Harroway ===
Harroway (3)
Party	Candidate	Votes	%	±%
Conservative	Carl Borg-Neal	1,903	42.30	▼6.03
Conservative	Karen Hamilton	1,761		
Conservative	Brian Page	1,545		
UKIP	Simon Hession	1,066	23.69	▲4.18
Labour	Madeleine Fairweather	869	19.31	▼0.20
Green	Laura Marriner	660	14.67	▲14.67
Green	Barbara Mitchell	513		
Green	Lance Mitchell	377		
Turnout				
Conservative hold		Swing		
Conservative hold		Swing		
Conservative hold		Swing		

=== Kings Somborne and Michelmersh ===
Kings Somborne and Michelmersh
Party	Candidate	Votes	%	±%
Conservative	Tony Ward	1,093	65.17	▼6.07
Liberal Democrats	Sandra Cosier	384	22.89	▼5.86
UKIP	Richard Scott	200	11.92	▲11.92
Turnout				
Conservative hold		Swing		

=== Millway ===
Millway (3)
Party	Candidate	Votes	%	±%
Conservative	Zilliah Brooks	2,080	41.68	▼14.05
Conservative	Sandra Hawke	1,812		
Conservative	Jim Neal	1,545		
UKIP	Mo Cleary	877	17.57	▲4.52
Liberal Democrats	Christopher Ecclestone	638	12.78	▼3.94
Green	Carol Bartholomew	602	12.06	▲12.06
Labour	Jeffrey Davey	586	11.74	▼2.73
Green	Dean Marriner	490		
Liberal Democrats	Ross Fifield	569	382	
Independent	Tony Hooke	207	4.14	▲4.14
Independent	Alex Gillies	205		
Independent	Steve McKellar	195		
Turnout				
Conservative hold		Swing		
Conservative hold		Swing		
Conservative hold		Swing		

=== North Baddesley ===
North Baddesley (3)
Party	Candidate	Votes	%	±%
Liberal Democrats	Ann Tupper	1,584	37.40	▼17.29
Liberal Democrats	Stephen Cosier	1,534		
Liberal Democrats	Celia Dowden	1,522		
Conservative	Andrew Milligan	1,382	32.63	▲2.10
Conservative	Harmeet Brar	1,005		
Conservative	Phil Williams	973		
UKIP	Paul Cadier	816	19.26	▲19.26
Turnout				
Liberal Democrats hold		Swing		
Liberal Democrats hold		Swing		
Liberal Democrats hold		Swing		

=== Over Wallop ===
Over Wallop
Party	Candidate	Votes	%	±%
Conservative	Tony Hope	Unopposed		
Conservative hold		Swing		

=== Penton Bellinger ===
Penton Bellinger (2)
Party	Candidate	Votes	%	±%
Conservative	Phil Lashbrook	1,734	58.38	▼17.56
Conservative	Pam Mutton	1,254		
UKIP	Barry Hodgson	693	23.33	▲23.33
Liberal Democrats	Barbara Carpenter	543	18.28	▲18.28
Turnout				
Conservative hold		Swing		
Conservative hold		Swing		

=== Romsey Extra ===
Romsey Extra (2)
Party	Candidate	Votes	%	±%
Conservative	Ian Hibberd	1,123	38.06	▼16.80
Conservative	Alison Johnston	1,053		
Liberal Democrats	Karen Dunleavey	609	20.64	▼13.76
Liberal Democrats	John Parker	520		
UKIP	Alex Briggs	359	12.16	▲12.16
Green	Ian Callaghan	330	11.18	▲11.18
Independent	Richard Buss	302	10.23	▲10.23
Labour	Barney Jones	227	7.69	▼3.03
Turnout				
Conservative hold		Swing		
Conservative hold		Swing		

=== St Mary's ===
St Mary's (3)
Party	Candidate	Votes	%	±%
Conservative	Iris Andersen	1,638	35.27	▲5.63
Conservative	John Cockaday	1,289		
Conservative	David Denny	1,245		
UKIP	Daniel Emmerson	922	19.85	▲5.39
UKIP	Peter Mather	855		
Liberal Democrats	Katherine Bird	806	17.35	▼10.31
UKIP	Vincent McGarry	794		
Liberal Democrats	Nigel Long	724		
Labour	Alan Cotter	684	14.72	▼3.34
Labour	Nicole Gentleman	635		
Liberal Democrats	Sheryl Scott-Clarke	536		
Labour	Alan Wright	504		
Green	Catherine Hosen	435	9.36	▲9.36
Independent	Russell Tarrant	159	3.42	▲3.42
Turnout				
Conservative hold		Swing		
Conservative gain from Liberal Democrats		Swing		
Conservative gain from Liberal Democrats		Swing		

=== Tadburn ===
Tadburn (2)
Party	Candidate	Votes	%	±%
Liberal Democrats	Mark Cooper	1,737	48.06	▼4.40
Liberal Democrats	Peter Hurst	1,371		
Conservative	Nick Michell	1,007	27.86	▼8.91
Conservative	Matthew Southey	781		
UKIP	Roy Bishop	477	13.19	▲13.19
Labour	Carolyn Nixson	393	10.87	▲0.10
Turnout				
Liberal Democrats hold		Swing		
Liberal Democrats hold		Swing		

=== Valley Park ===
Valley Park (3)
Party	Candidate	Votes	%	±%
Liberal Democrats	Alan Dowden	2,238	53.52	▼7.63
Liberal Democrats	Andrew Beesley	1,966		
Liberal Democrats	Kath Tilling	1,803		
Conservative	Tim England	1,483	35.46	▼3.38
Conservative	Anne Winstanley	1,388		
Conservative	Ryan Sutton	1,116		
UKIP	Sarah Morgan	460	11.00	▲11.00
Turnout				
Liberal Democrats hold		Swing		
Liberal Democrats hold		Swing		
Liberal Democrats hold		Swing		

=== Winton ===
Winton (3)
Party	Candidate	Votes	%	±%
Conservative	Chris Lynn	1,995	35.42	▼7.74
Conservative	Jan Lovell	1,899		
Conservative	Jan Budzynski	1,653		
UKIP	Marley Spicer	1,130	20.06	▼0.21
Labour	Adam Jones	1,024	18.18	▲3.72
Liberal Democrats	Sid Dajani	920	16.33	▼5.76
Independent	Nick Thirsk	563	9.99	▲9.99
Turnout				
Conservative hold		Swing		
Conservative hold		Swing		
Conservative hold		Swing		
