= 2019 Test Valley Borough Council election =

2019 UK local government election

- 2 May 2019

All 43 seats to Test Valley Borough Council 22 seats needed for a majority
	First party	Second party	Third party
Party	Conservative	Liberal Democrats	Andover Alliance
Last election	38	9	0 (Note: New Party)
Seats won	24	12	7
Popular vote	14,209	9,873	5,092
Percentage	42.38	29.44	15.18
Council control before election
Conservatives
Council control after election
Conservatives

The 2019 Test Valley Borough Council election took place on 2 May 2019 to elect members of Test Valley Borough Council in England. This was on the same day as other local elections. The whole council was up for election on new boundaries, with the number of seats reduced from 48 across 24 wards to 43 across 20.

The Conservatives remained the largest party, with 24 seats out of the 22 required for a majority, and with the Liberal Democrats winning twelve seats across Romsey; a new localist party, the Andover Alliance, stood in the Andover Wards, winning a total of seven seats.

== Summary ==
=== Election result ===
2019 Test Valley District Council election
Party	Candidates	Seats	Gains	Losses	Net gain/loss	Seats %	Votes %	Votes	+/−
Conservative	43	24	N/A	N/A	▼14	55.8	42.4	14,209	–1.9
Liberal Democrats	25	12	N/A	N/A	▲2	27.9	29.4	9,873	–7.6
Andover Alliance	20	7	N/A	N/A	▲7	16.3	15.2	5,092	N/A
Labour	13	0	N/A	N/A	Steady	0.0	8.6	2,898	–0.3
Independent	3	0	N/A	N/A	▼1	0.0	3.5	1,185	–1.1
Green	1	0	N/A	N/A	Steady	0.0	0.5	157	–3.9
UKIP	1	0	N/A	N/A	Steady	0.0	0.4	123	–15.1

Party vote totals in the table are the sum of each party's highest-polling candidate in each ward.

== Ward results ==
The results for each ward were as follows.

=== Ampfield and Braishfield ===
Ampfield and Braishfield
Party	Candidate	Votes	%	±%
Conservative	Martin Hatley	528	54.43	
Liberal Democrats	Sally Yalden	402	41.44	
Labour	Viv MacKay	40	4.12	
Majority		126	12.99	
Turnout		978	45.83	
Rejected ballots		8	0.8	
Registered electors		2,134		
Conservative win (new seat)				

=== Andover Downlands ===
Andover Downlands (2)
Party	Candidate	Votes	%	±%
Conservative	Christopher Donnelly	424	49.59	
Conservative	Nick Lodge	408	47.72	
Andover Alliance	Lee Fort	251	29.36	
Andover Alliance	Edwin Treadwell	228	26.67	
Labour	Adam Buckenham	190	22.22	
Majority		157	18.36	
Turnout		860	26.02	
Rejected ballots		5	0.6	
Registered electors		3,305		
Conservative win (new seat)				
Conservative win (new seat)				

=== Andover Harroway ===
Andover Harroway (3)
Party	Candidate	Votes	%	±%
Conservative	Carl Borg-Neal	669	31.41	
Conservative	Karen Hamilton	669	31.41	
Conservative	Tony Burley	626	29.39	
Andover Alliance	Lauren Banville	561	26.34	
Andover Alliance	Peter Scott	544	25.54	
Andover Alliance	Dorothy Day	534	25.07	
Liberal Democrats	Luigi Gregori	519	24.37	
Liberal Democrats	Robin Hughes	509	23.90	
Liberal Democrats	Josephine Msonthi	412	19.34	
Labour	Andrew Fitchet	378	17.75	
Labour	Peter Cooper	372	17.46	
Majority		65	3.05	
Turnout		2,148	29.31	
Rejected ballots		18	0.8	
Registered electors		7,328		
Conservative win (new seat)				
Conservative win (new seat)				
Conservative win (new seat)				

=== Andover Millway ===
Andover Millway (3)
Party	Candidate	Votes	%	±%
Conservative	Zilliah Brooks	1,080	49.20	
Andover Alliance	Christopher Ecclestone	1,076	49.02	
Andover Alliance	Alison Watts	1,054	48.02	
Andover Alliance	Scott Blackmore	980	44.65	
Conservative	Sandra Hawke	947	43.14	
Conservative	Jim Neal	916	41.73	
Majority		74	3.37	
Turnout		2,232	32.70	
Rejected ballots		37	1.7	
Registered electors		6,825		
Conservative win (new seat)				
Andover Alliance win (new seat)				
Andover Alliance win (new seat)				

=== Andover Romans ===
Andover Romans (3)
Party	Candidate	Votes	%	±%
Conservative	Kirsty North	623	41.04	
Conservative	Nick Matthews	604	39.79	
Conservative	Tracey Preston	575	37.88	
Liberal Democrats	Barbara Carpenter	398	26.22	
Andover Alliance	David Treadwell	377	24.84	
Andover Alliance	Graeme Davis	374	24.64	
Liberal Democrats	Kevin Hughes	348	22.92	
Andover Alliance	Lenka Mead	331	21.81	
Liberal Democrats	Richard Kidd	316	20.82	
Labour	Scott Hall	215	14.16	
Majority		177	11.66	
Turnout		1,533	26.66	
Rejected ballots		15	1.0	
Registered electors		5,751		
Conservative win (new seat)				
Conservative win (new seat)				
Conservative win (new seat)				

=== Andover St Mary's ===
Andover St Mary's (3)
Party	Candidate	Votes	%	±%
Andover Alliance	Kevin Farrer	601	35.35	
Conservative	Iris Andersen	591	34.76	
Andover Alliance	Victoria Thorp	556	32.71	
Andover Alliance	Michael James	550	32.35	
Conservative	John Cockaday	463	27.24	
Conservative	David Denny	419	24.65	
Independent	Nigel Long	384	22.59	
Liberal Democrats	Katherine Bird	319	18.76	
Labour	Michael Mumford	276	16.24	
Majority		6	0.35	
Turnout		1,714	27.61	
Rejected ballots		14	0.8	
Registered electors		6,208		
Andover Alliance win (new seat)				
Conservative win (new seat)				
Andover Alliance win (new seat)				

=== Andover Winton ===
Andover Winton (2)
Party	Candidate	Votes	%	±%
Andover Alliance	Rebecca Meyer	743	50.20	
Andover Alliance	Richard Rowles	719	48.58	
Conservative	Pam Mutton	686	46.35	
Conservative	Jan Budzynski	619	41.82	
Majority		33	2.23	
Turnout		1,508	30.91	
Rejected ballots		28	1.9	
Registered electors		4,879		
Andover Alliance win (new seat)				
Andover Alliance win (new seat)				

=== Anna ===
Anna (2)
Party	Candidate	Votes	%	±%
Conservative	Maureen Flood	1,214	57.40	
Andover Alliance	David Coole	949	44.87	
Conservative	Ben Few Brown	948	44.82	
Andover Alliance	Maureen Treadwell	782	36.97	
Majority		1	0.05	
Turnout		2,143	42.84	
Rejected ballots		28	1.3	
Registered electors		5,002		
Conservative win (new seat)				
Andover Alliance win (new seat)				

=== Bellinger ===
Bellinger
Party	Candidate	Votes	%	±%
Conservative	Phil Lashbrook	Unopposed		
Conservative hold		Swing		

=== Blackwater ===
Blackwater (2)
Party	Candidate	Votes	%	±%
Conservative	Nick Adams-King	1,214	63.30	
Conservative	Gordon Bailey	1,134	59.12	
Independent	Brexit Paul Cadier	443	23.10	
Labour	Christopher Craig	436	22.73	
Majority		691	36.03	
Turnout		1,943	40.04	
Rejected ballots		25	1.3	
Registered electors		4,853		
Conservative win (new seat)				

=== Bourne Valley ===
Bourne Valley
Party	Candidate	Votes	%	±%
Conservative	Phil North	Unopposed		
Conservative hold		Swing		

=== Charlton and the Pentons ===
Charlton and the Pentons
Party	Candidate	Votes	%	±%
Conservative	Linda Lashbrook	471	51.03	
Andover Alliance	Rebecca Speculo	172	18.63	
Green	Lance Mitchell	157	17.01	
UKIP	Norman Woods	123	13.33	
Majority		299	32.39	
Turnout		926	36.20	
Rejected ballots		3	0.3	
Registered electors		2,558		
Conservative win (new seat)				

=== Chilworth, Nursling and Rownhams ===
Chilworth, Nursling and Rownhams (3)
Party	Candidate	Votes	%	±%
Conservative	Phil Bundy	1,187	58.70	
Conservative	Nige Anderdon	1,123	55.54	
Conservative	Alison Finlay	1,114	55.09	
Liberal Democrats	Karen Dunleavey	612	30.27	
Liberal Democrats	Clive Anderson	517	25.57	
Liberal Democrats	Brian Richards	470	23.24	
Labour	Sharon Blackett	236	11.67	
Majority		502	24.83	
Turnout		2,060	34.55	
Rejected ballots		38	1.8	
Registered electors		5,963		
Conservative win (new seat)				
Conservative win (new seat)				
Conservative win (new seat)				

=== Harewood ===
Harewood
Party	Candidate	Votes	%	±%
Conservative	David Drew	757	67.65	
Andover Alliance	Georgina Roberts	362	32.35	
Majority		395	35.30	
Turnout		1,138	43.07	
Rejected ballots		19	1.7	
Registered electors		2,642		
Conservative win (new seat)				

=== Mid Test ===
Mid Test (3)
Party	Candidate	Votes	%	±%
Conservative	Tony Ward	1,492	59.82	
Conservative	Ian Jeffrey	1,471	58.98	
Conservative	Alison Johnston	1,371	54.97	
Liberal Democrats	Harry Paul	877	35.16	
Liberal Democrats	Paul Burnage	793	31.80	
Labour	Sally Saunders	427	17.12	
Majority		494	19.81	
Turnout		2,544	35.40	
Rejected ballots		50	2.0	
Registered electors		7,187		
Conservative win (new seat)				
Conservative win (new seat)				
Conservative win (new seat)				

=== North Baddesley ===
North Baddesley (3)
Party	Candidate	Votes	%	±%
Liberal Democrats	Celia Dowden	1,311	68.57	
Liberal Democrats	Alan Warnes	1,291	67.52	
Liberal Democrats	Simon Cross	1,141	59.68	
Conservative	Andy Milligan	631	33.00	
Conservative	Alan Higginson	498	26.05	
Conservative	Derek Langford	414	21.65	
Majority		510	26.67	
Turnout		1,961	33.53	
Rejected ballots		49	2.5	
Registered electors		5,848		
Liberal Democrats win (new seat)				
Liberal Democrats win (new seat)				
Liberal Democrats win (new seat)				

=== Romsey Abbey ===
Romsey Abbey (2)
Party	Candidate	Votes	%	±%
Liberal Democrats	Sandra Gidley	1,372	63.02	
Liberal Democrats	Nik Daas	1,148	52.73	
Conservative	Mark Bramley	749	34.41	
Conservative	Simon Hayes	682	31.33	
Labour	Stuart Bannerman	184	8.45	
Majority		399	18.33	
Turnout		2,208	45.68	
Rejected ballots		31	1.4	
Registered electors		4,834		
Liberal Democrats win (new seat)				
Liberal Democrats win (new seat)				

=== Romsey Cupernham ===
Romsey Cupernham (3)
Party	Candidate	Votes	%	±%
Liberal Democrats	Dorothy Baverstock	1,260	55.48	
Liberal Democrats	Janet Burnage	1,094	48.17	
Liberal Democrats	Neil Gwynne	952	41.92	
Conservative	John Ray	819	36.06	
Conservative	Lynne Askey	731	32.19	
Conservative	Janett Whiteley	690	30.38	
Independent	Ian Hibberd	358	15.76	
Labour	Phil Griffiths	214	9.42	
Majority		133	5.86	
Turnout		2,285	37.89	
Rejected ballots		14	0.6	
Registered electors		6,031		
Liberal Democrats win (new seat)				
Liberal Democrats win (new seat)				
Liberal Democrats win (new seat)				

=== Romsey Tadburn ===
Romsey Tadburn (2)
Party	Candidate	Votes	%	±%
Liberal Democrats	Mark Cooper	1,307	64.86	
Liberal Democrats	John Parker	1,086	53.90	
Conservative	Ian Richards	660	32.75	
Conservative	Dave Maslen	589	29.23	
Labour	Simon Cotton	195	9.68	
Majority		426	21.14	
Turnout		2,041	43.96	
Rejected ballots		26	1.3	
Registered electors		4,643		
Liberal Democrats win (new seat)				
Liberal Democrats win (new seat)				

=== Valley Park ===
Valley Park (2)
Party	Candidate	Votes	%	±%
Liberal Democrats	Alan Dowden	1,496	77.84	
Liberal Democrats	Christopher Thom	1,175	61.13	
Conservative	Jillie Curtis	414	21.54	
Conservative	Roger Curtis	382	19.88	
Labour	David Watson	107	5.57	
Majority		1,082	53.64	
Turnout		1,941	41.44	
Rejected ballots		19	1.0	
Registered electors		4,684		
Liberal Democrats win (new seat)				
Liberal Democrats win (new seat)				

== Changes 2019–2023 ==
- The Andover Alliance was recognised as a political group at the first meeting of the new council on 13 May 2019, made up of councillors Coole and Ecclestone.
- Martin Hatley (Ampfield and Braishfield), elected as a Conservative, resigned from the Conservative group in October 2022 and was sitting as an independent by November 2022.
- By December 2022, David Coole (Anna) and Rebecca Meyer (Andover Winton), both elected for the Andover Alliance, were also listed as independent councillors, and Christopher Ecclestone (Andover Millway) as a Liberal Party councillor.

=== By-elections ===
==== Andover Millway ====
A by-election was held on 6 May 2021 after Andover Alliance councillor Alison Watts resigned in February 2021. The Conservatives gained the seat from the Andover Alliance.

Andover Millway by-election: 6 May 2021
Party	Candidate	Votes	%	±%
Conservative	Jim Neal	1,246	52.71	
Liberal Democrats	Robin Hughes	359	15.19	
Green	Lance Mitchell	259	10.96	
Labour	Tom Kingsley	251	10.62	
Andover Independents Party	Susana Ecclestone	249	10.53	
Majority		887	37.52	
Turnout		2,383	34.95	
Rejected ballots		19	0.8	
Registered electors		6,819		
Conservative gain from Andover Alliance				

==== Andover St Mary's ====
A by-election was held on 6 May 2021 to fill a vacancy in Andover St Mary's ward. The Conservatives gained the seat from the Andover Alliance.

Andover St Mary's by-election: 6 May 2021
Party	Candidate	Votes	%	±%
Conservative	Jan Budzynski	790	49.19	
Labour	Andrew Fitchet	439	27.33	
Liberal Democrats	Nigel Long	377	23.47	
Majority		351	21.86	
Rejected ballots		29		
Registered electors		6,194		
Conservative gain from Andover Alliance				

==== Chilworth, Nursling and Rownhams ====
By-elections were held on 6 May 2021 to fill two vacancies in Chilworth, Nursling and Rownhams ward. The Conservatives held both seats.

Chilworth, Nursling and Rownhams by-election: 6 May 2021
Party	Candidate	Votes	%	±%
Conservative	Mike Maltby	1,391	57.91	
Conservative	Terese Swain	1,365	56.83	
Liberal Democrats	Karen Dunleavey	742	30.89	
Liberal Democrats	Andrew Beesley	674	28.06	
Majority		623	25.94	
Turnout		2,428	39.03	
Rejected ballots		26	1.1	
Registered electors		6,221		
Conservative hold				
Conservative hold				

==== North Baddesley ====
A by-election was held on 24 March 2022 after Liberal Democrat councillor Simon Cross stepped down owing to ill health. The Liberal Democrats held the seat.

North Baddesley by-election: 24 March 2022
Party	Candidate	Votes	%	±%
Liberal Democrats	Geoff Cooper	1,095	63.92	
Conservative	George McMenemy	618	36.08	
Majority		477	27.85	
Turnout		1,718	29.65	
Rejected ballots		5	0.3	
Registered electors		5,793		
Liberal Democrats hold				

==== Andover Romans ====
A by-election was held on 15 December 2022 after Conservative councillor Nick Matthews resigned. The Liberal Democrats gained the seat from the Conservatives.

Andover Romans by-election: 15 December 2022
Party	Candidate	Votes	%	±%
Liberal Democrats	Jason Sangster	400	57.64	
Conservative	Katie Brooks	294	42.36	
Majority		106	15.27	
Turnout			9.71	
Rejected ballots		8		
Registered electors		7,238		
Liberal Democrats gain from Conservative				
