= Mendip District Council elections =

Local elections in the United Kingdom

Prior to its 2023 abolition, Mendip District Council in Somerset, England was elected every four years. On 1 April of that year, the district was abolished and became part of the area of Somerset Council, a new unitary authority.

== Political control ==
The first election to the council was held in 1973, initially acting as a shadow authority alongside the outgoing councils before formally coming into office on 1 April 1974. Political control of the council was as follows:

Party in control	Years
Independent	1974–1976
No overall control	1976–1979
Independent	1979–1983
Conservative	1983–1987
No overall control	1987–2003
Conservative	2003–2019
No overall control	2019–2023

=== Leadership ===
The leaders of the council from 2007 until its abolition in 2023 were:

Councillor	Party	From	To
Harvey Siggs	Conservative	2007	May 2019
Ros Wyke	Liberal Democrats	20 May 2019	31 Mar 2023

== Council elections ==
- 1973 Mendip District Council election
- 1976 Mendip District Council election
- 1979 Mendip District Council election (New ward boundaries)
- 1983 Mendip District Council election
- 1987 Mendip District Council election
- 1991 Mendip District Council election (District boundary changes took place but the number of seats remained the same)
- 1995 Mendip District Council election
- 1999 Mendip District Council election (New ward boundaries increased the number of seats by three)
- 2003 Mendip District Council election
- 2007 Mendip District Council election (New ward boundaries increased the number of seats by one)
- 2011 Mendip District Council election
- 2015 Mendip District Council election
- 2019 Mendip District Council election

== District result maps ==
2003 results map

2007 results map

2011 results map

2015 results map

2019 results map

== By-election results ==
=== 1995–1999 ===
Wells St Cuthberts By-Election 31 October 1996
Party	Candidate	Votes	%	±%
Conservative		390	32.8	
Liberal Democrats		300	25.3	
Labour		298	25.1	
Independent		111	9.3	
Independent		90	7.6	
Majority		90	7.5	
Turnout		1,189	35.0	
Conservative gain from Liberal Democrats		Swing		

Frome Badcox By-Election 25 September 1997
Party	Candidate	Votes	%	±%
Labour		516	45.7	+45.7
Liberal Democrats		355	31.4	−24.7
Conservative		259	22.9	−21.0
Majority		161	14.3	
Turnout		1,130		
Labour gain from Liberal Democrats		Swing		

Street North By-Election 23 April 1998
Party	Candidate	Votes	%	±%
Liberal Democrats		386	39.4	+3.3
Labour		281	28.0	−2.0
Conservative		214	21.3	+12.3
Independent Labour		114	11.3	+11.3
Majority		115	11.4	
Turnout		1,005		
Liberal Democrats gain from Labour		Swing		

=== 1999–2003 ===
Frome Keyford By-Election 11 October 2001
Party	Candidate	Votes	%	±%
Labour		389	35.9	−11.2
Liberal Democrats		350	32.3	−5.3
Conservative		317	29.2	
UKIP		29	2.7	+2.7
Majority		39	3.6	
Turnout		1,085	30.0	
Labour hold		Swing		

=== 2003–2007 ===
Beckington and Rode By-Election 10 June 2004
Party	Candidate	Votes	%	±%
Liberal Democrats	Stan Wilson	538	50.3	+10.6
Conservative	Robert Pearson	529	49.5	−10.6
Majority		9	0.8	
Turnout		1,067	56.8	
Liberal Democrats gain from Conservative		Swing		

Frome Berkley Down By-Election 16 March 2006
Party	Candidate	Votes	%	±%
Liberal Democrats	Ros Meikle	439	55.0	+10.7
Conservative	Robert Smitherman	359	45.0	−10.7
Majority		80	10.0	
Turnout		798	20.0	
Liberal Democrats gain from Conservative		Swing		

Frome Keyford By-Election 20 April 2006
Party	Candidate	Votes	%	±%
Liberal Democrats	Alvin Horsfall	487	63.2	+36.6
Labour	David Oakensen	128	16.6	−3.1
Conservative	Pamelita Lee	104	13.5	−4.0
UKIP	Colin McManee	51	6.6	+6.6
Majority		359	46.6	
Turnout		770	20.0	
Liberal Democrats gain from Independent		Swing		

=== 2007–2011 ===
Glastonbury St Edmunds By-Election 13 September 2007
Party	Candidate	Votes	%	±%
Conservative	John Brundson	432	55.4	+10.8
Liberal Democrats	Alan Gloak	348	44.6	−10.8
Majority		84	10.8	
Turnout		780		
Conservative gain from Liberal Democrats		Swing		

Shepton East By-Election 29 May 2008
Party	Candidate	Votes	%	±%
Conservative	Jeannette Marsh	435	50.3	+4.1
Liberal Democrats	Bob Champion	307	35.5	−3.0
Labour	Christopher Inchley	122	14.1	−1.1
Majority		128	14.8	
Turnout		864		
Conservative hold		Swing		

Street North By-Election 29 May 2008
Party	Candidate	Votes	%	±%
Liberal Democrats	Bryan Beha	347	47.9	−19.8
Conservative	George Steer	297	41.0	+8.6
Independent	Julian Bartlett	81	11.2	+11.2
Majority		50	6.9	
Turnout		725		
Liberal Democrats hold		Swing		

=== 2015–2019 ===
Frome College By-Election 4 May 2017
Party	Candidate	Votes	%	±%
Conservative	Carole Jane Bullen	576	44.3	+6.0
Liberal Democrats	Alexander James Shingler	469	36.0	−0.7
Green	Pepita Collins	192	14.8	+0.5
Liberal	Derek Fredrick Edmond Tanswell	64	4.9	N/A
Majority		107	8.3	+6.7
Turnout		1,312		
Conservative hold		Swing		

Wells St Thomas' By-Election 25 October 2018
Party	Candidate	Votes	%	±%
Liberal Democrats	Thomas Ronan	594	48.8	+4.7
Conservative	Richard James Austin Greenwell	493	40.5	+5.2
Labour	Denise Ruth Carter	131	10.8	N/A
Majority		101	8.3	−0.5
Turnout		1,224		
Liberal Democrats hold		Swing		

=== 2019–2023 ===
Wells St Thomas' By-Election 6 May 2021
Party	Candidate	Votes	%	±%
Conservative	Tanys Eileen Pullin	887	58.0	+27.5
Labour	Adam David Fyfe	642	42.0	+31.6
Majority				N/A
Turnout		1,529		
Conservative gain from Liberal Democrats		Swing		

Butleigh and Baltonsborough By-Election 6 October 2022
Party	Candidate	Votes	%	±%
Conservative	Ken Maddock	393	50.3	−2.3
Liberal Democrats	Claire Sully	389	49.7	+16.4
Majority		4	0.6	
Turnout		782	39.0	
Conservative hold		Swing	▼9.4	
