= 2019 Mendip District Council election =

2019 English local government election

- 2 May 2019

All 47 seats to Mendip District Council 24 seats needed for a majority
	First party	Second party
	LD	Con
Party	Liberal Democrats	Conservative
Last election	11 seats, 30.8%	32 seats, 43.3%
Seats won	22	10
Seat change	▲11	▼22
Popular vote	16,228	16,067
Percentage	33.9%	33.5%
Swing	▲3.1%	▼9.8%
	Third party	Fourth party
	Grn	Ind
Party	Green	Independent
Last election	3 seats, 13.1%	1 seat, 1.7%
Seats won	10	5
Seat change	▲7	▲4
Popular vote	7,561	3,344
Percentage	15.8%	7.0%
Swing	▲2.7%	▲5.3%
- Map showing the results of the 2019 Mendip District Council following the election.
Council control before election
Conservative
Council control after election
No overall control

The 2019 Mendip District Council election took place on 2 May 2019 to elect members of Mendip District Council in England. The council was abolished when Somerset became a Unitary Authority in 2022.

== Election results ==
Mendip District Council Election, 2019
Party	Seats	Gains	Losses	Net gain/loss	Seats %	Votes %	Votes	+/−
Liberal Democrats	22			+11	46.8	33.9	16,228	
Conservative	10			−22	21.3	33.5	16,067	
Green	10			+7	21.3	15.8	7,561	
Independent	5			+4	10.6	7.0	3,344	
Labour	0			+/−0	0.0	9.7	4,667	
UKIP	0			+/−0	0.0	0.1	56	

== Ward results ==
The ward results listed below are based on the changes from the 2015 elections not taking into account any party defections or by-elections. Sitting councillors are marked with an asterisk (*).

=== Ammerdown ===
Ammerdown
Party	Candidate	Votes	%	±%
Green	Alison Margaret Barkshire	441	59.6	+39.5
Conservative	Edward George Drewe *	299	40.4	–5.2
Majority		142	19.2	N/A
Turnout		757	38.3	–35.0
Green gain from Conservative		Swing		

=== Ashwick, Chilcompton and Stratton ===
Ashwick, Chilcompton and Stratton (2 seats)
Party	Candidate	Votes	%	±%
Liberal Democrats	Joshua Stuart Burr	655	49.2	
Liberal Democrats	Sam Robin Phripp	611	45.9	
Conservative	Rachel Carter *	454	34.1	
Conservative	John Gerrard Carter *	441	33.1	
Green	David Hine	233	17.5	N/A
Labour	Ant Butler	126	9.5	N/A
Turnout		1,331	36.8	–34.2
Liberal Democrats gain from Conservative		Swing		
Liberal Democrats gain from Conservative		Swing		

=== Beckington and Selwood ===
Beckington and Selwood
Party	Candidate	Votes	%	±%
Conservative	Shannon Brooke	383	51.2	–5.8
Green	Julian Thomas	193	25.8	+5.8
Liberal Democrats	Christine Frances Cockroft	172	23.0	±0.0
Majority		190	25.4	–8.7
Turnout		753	42.0	–31.1
Conservative hold		Swing		

=== Butleigh and Baltonsborough ===
Butleigh and Baltonsborough
Party	Candidate	Votes	%	±%
Conservative	Nigel Woollcombe-Adams *	427	52.6	–8.3
Liberal Democrats	Richard George Wiltshire	270	33.3	–5.8
Labour	Jackie Llewellyn	115	14.2	N/A
Majority		157	19.3	–2.5
Turnout		827	42.9	–32.3
Conservative hold		Swing		

=== Chewton Mendip and Ston Easton ===
Chewton Mendip and Ston Easton
Party	Candidate	Votes	%	±%
Conservative	Tom Killen *	557	68.5	N/A
Liberal Democrats	Christina Murray Baron	184	22.6	N/A
Labour	Jacky Carter	72	8.9	N/A
Majority		373	45.9	N/A
Turnout		824	47.2	N/A
Conservative hold				

=== Coleford and Holcombe ===
Coleford and Holcombe (2 seats)
Party	Candidate	Votes	%	±%
Conservative	Philip John Ham *	788	62.0	
Conservative	Alan Townsend *	705	55.5	
Labour	Melanie Moulding	456	35.9	N/A
Labour	Chad Chapman	423	33.3	N/A
Turnout		1,271	34.7	–34.1
Conservative hold		Swing		
Conservative hold		Swing		

=== Cranmore, Doulting and Nunney ===
Cranmore, Doulting and Nunney
Party	Candidate	Votes	%	±%
Green	Francis Edward Hayden	419	50.9	N/A
Conservative	David Julian Van Dyk *	404	49.1	+3.0
Majority		15	1.8	N/A
Turnout		842	45.4	–27.2
Green gain from Conservative		Swing		

=== Creech ===
Creech
Party	Candidate	Votes	%	±%
Liberal Democrats	Barry William O'Leary	552	63.8	+34.1
Conservative	Lesley Anne Parham	313	36.2	–18.9
Majority		239	27.6	N/A
Turnout		874	43.6	–23.2
Liberal Democrats gain from Conservative		Swing		

=== Croscombe and Pilton ===
Croscombe and Pilton
Party	Candidate	Votes	%	±%
Conservative	Nigel Hewitt-Cooper *	360	34.4	–23.5
Liberal Democrats	Ross Kessell	338	32.3	–9.8
Independent	James Neil Morris	202	19.3	N/A
Labour Co-op	Gregory Paul Turner	146	14.0	N/A
Majority		22	2.1	–13.7
Turnout		1,050	49.1	–21.4
Conservative hold		Swing		

=== Frome Berkley Down ===
Frome Berkley Down (2 seats)
Party	Candidate	Votes	%	±%
Liberal Democrats	Janine Louise Nash	427	39.8	
Conservative	Eve Berry *	409	38.1	
Green	Matt Mellen	391	36.4	
Conservative	Martin Victor Clark	341	31.8	
Liberal Democrats	Alex Shingler	304	28.3	
Turnout		1,073	32.1	–31.6
Liberal Democrats gain from Conservative		Swing		
Conservative hold		Swing		

=== Frome College ===
Frome College (2 seats)
Party	Candidate	Votes	%	±%
Liberal Democrats	Adam Owen Matthew Boyden *	785	62.5	
Liberal Democrats	Drew James Gardner	689	54.9	
Conservative	Carole Jane Bullen *	329	26.2	
Conservative	Jamie Seviour	282	22.5	
Labour	Christine Olive De Pufford	160	12.7	
Labour	Lucy Josephine Shapcott	149	11.9	
Turnout		1,255	38.8	–29.3
Liberal Democrats hold		Swing		
Liberal Democrats gain from Conservative		Swing		

=== Frome Keyford ===
Frome Keyford (2 seats)
Party	Candidate	Votes	%	±%
Green	Shane Collins *	1,011	69.3	
Green	Helen Kay	977	67.0	
Labour	David Alan Oakensen	257	17.6	
Labour	Billy Almond	249	17.1	
Conservative	Randall Heather	184	12.6	
Conservative	Graham Noel	173	11.9	
Turnout		1,458	34.2	–27.1
Green hold		Swing		
Green gain from Liberal Democrats		Swing		

=== Frome Market ===
Frome Market (2 seats)
Party	Candidate	Votes	%	±%
Green	John Clarke	888	65.1	
Green	Michael John Dunk	868	63.6	
Labour	Rosie Mitchell	252	18.5	
Conservative	Elizabeth Janet John	241	17.7	
Conservative	Chris Stacey Moor	189	13.8	
Labour	Marc James Peel	179	13.1	
Turnout		1,365	37.4	–25.0
Green hold		Swing		
Green hold		Swing		

=== Frome Oakfield ===
Frome Oakfield
Party	Candidate	Votes	%	±%
Independent	Helen Elaine Sprawson-White *	666	81.7	N/A
Labour	David Ramsay Sibbald	86	10.6	+1.5
Conservative	Beverley Ann Andree	63	7.7	–11.5
Majority		580	71.1	N/A
Turnout		824	41.1	–23.8
Independent gain from Liberal Democrats		Swing		

Helen Elaine Sprawson-White was elected as a Liberal Democrat in 2015 and rejoined the party in 2020.

=== Frome Park ===
Frome Park (2 seats)
Party	Candidate	Votes	%	±%
Liberal Democrats	Damon John Hooton *	647	51.7	
Liberal Democrats	Richard Francis Pinnock	611	48.8	
Labour	Pete Mellen	334	26.7	
Labour	Sean L Powell	308	24.6	
Conservative	Vicky Hicks	248	19.8	
Conservative	Hilary Anne Thomas	225	18.0	
Turnout		1,252	34.5	–27.2
Liberal Democrats hold		Swing		
Liberal Democrats hold		Swing		

=== Glastonbury St Benedict's ===
Glastonbury St Benedict's
Party	Candidate	Votes	%	±%
Independent	Robert Stephen Henderson *	227	31.2	N/A
Green	Brian Adrian Outten	181	24.9	–15.1
Liberal Democrats	Maggie Dear	151	20.7	N/A
Conservative	Stephen Bower	92	12.6	–32.8
Labour	Emma Jane King	77	10.6	–4.0
Majority		46	6.3	N/A
Turnout		728	37.7	–22.2
Independent gain from Conservative		Swing		

Robert Stephen Henderson was elected as a Conservative in 2015.

=== Glastonbury St Edmund's ===
Glastonbury St Edmund's
Party	Candidate	Votes	%	±%
Liberal Democrats	Nick Cottle *	322	43.6	+7.3
Green	Michael Kenneth Smyth	239	32.3	–3.7
Conservative	Rachel Mary Thompson	114	15.4	–12.2
Labour	Simon Anthony Baker-Cooke	64	8.7	N/A
Majority		83	11.2	+10.9
Turnout		750	44.9	–26.1
Liberal Democrats hold		Swing		

=== Glastonbury St John's ===
Glastonbury St John's
Party	Candidate	Votes	%	±%
Green	Jon Cousins	262	41.9	–2.3
Conservative	John Evan Coles *	260	41.6	–14.2
Labour	John Anthony Graham	103	16.5	N/A
Majority		2	0.3	N/A
Turnout		640	32.6	–31.8
Green gain from Conservative		Swing		

=== Glastonbury St Mary's ===
Glastonbury St Mary's
Party	Candidate	Votes	%	±%
Green	Lindsay Macdougall	217	25.9	–1.9
Conservative	David Albert Swain	197	23.5	–17.9
Independent	Robert Paul Lund	190	22.7	N/A
Liberal Democrats	Laiqa Browne	186	22.2	+0.1
Labour	Kama Hannah McKenzie	47	5.6	N/A
Majority		20	2.4	N/A
Turnout		840	50.2	–21.9
Green gain from Conservative		Swing		

=== Moor ===
Moor
Party	Candidate	Votes	%	±%
Liberal Democrats	Matthew Henry Martin	483	64.7	+27.6
Conservative	Sean David Edwin Sloan	264	35.3	–27.6
Majority		219	29.4	N/A
Turnout		760	36.2	–35.4
Liberal Democrats gain from Conservative		Swing		

=== Postlebury ===
Postlebury
Party	Candidate	Votes	%	±%
Green	Michael Gay	444	57.2	+31.5
Conservative	Linda Jean Norris	332	42.8	–9.4
Majority		112	14.4	N/A
Turnout		782	46.2	–30.7
Green gain from Conservative		Swing		

=== Rode and Norton St. Philip ===
Rode and Norton St. Philip
Party	Candidate	Votes	%	±%
Green	Barbi Lund	456	46.3	N/A
Conservative	David John Baker	426	43.3	–26.7
UKIP	Dion Ralph Drayson	56	5.7	N/A
Labour	Pascale Gillet	46	4.7	N/A
Majority		30	3.0	N/A
Turnout		989	50.7	–28.2
Green gain from Conservative		Swing		

=== Rodney and Westbury ===
Rodney and Westbury
Party	Candidate	Votes	%	±%
Liberal Democrats	Ros Wyke *	630	74.0	+26.6
Conservative	Holly Sinead Mary Osman	221	26.0	–17.9
Majority		409	48.1	+44.6
Turnout		858	48.8	–30.7
Liberal Democrats hold		Swing		

=== Shepton East ===
Shepton East (2 seats)
Party	Candidate	Votes	%	±%
Independent	Bente Height *	388	32.0	
Liberal Democrats	Warren Garfield Kennedy	388	32.0	
Independent	Nicholas Tolson	348	28.7	
Liberal Democrats	Gavin James Mayall	336	27.7	
Conservative	Jeannette May Marsh *	335	27.6	
Conservative	Nigel Ivan Pooley	258	21.3	
Labour	Kevin Powell	140	11.5	
Turnout		1,213	30.9	–26.9
Independent gain from Conservative		Swing		
Liberal Democrats gain from Conservative		Swing		

Bente Height was elected as a Conservative in 2015.

=== Shepton West ===
Shepton West (2 seats)
Party	Candidate	Votes	%	±%
Independent	Chris Inchley	633	48.7	N/A
Independent	Edric Wayland Hobbs	580	44.6	N/A
Conservative	John William Parham *	427	32.8	
Conservative	Wayne Frapple	389	29.9	
Green	Paul Francis Crummay	184	14.1	N/A
Labour	Gareth Davies John	164	12.6	
Turnout		1,301	34.5	–28.1
Independent gain from Conservative		Swing		
Independent gain from Conservative		Swing		

=== St Cuthbert Out North ===
St Cuthbert Out North
Party	Candidate	Votes	%	±%
Conservative	Mike Pullin *	451	52.6	+3.8
Liberal Democrats	Tom Wyatt	406	47.4	+36.1
Majority		45	5.3	–17.3
Turnout		879	43.3	–31.1
Conservative hold		Swing		

=== Street North ===
Street North (2 seats)
Party	Candidate	Votes	%	±%
Liberal Democrats	Heather Shearer	519	57.2	
Liberal Democrats	Peter Goater	492	54.2	
Conservative	Matthew Tomlinson	285	31.4	
Conservative	Christopher John Allen	248	27.3	
Labour	John Diment	133	14.7	N/A
Turnout		907	28.0	–33.2
Liberal Democrats hold		Swing		
Liberal Democrats gain from Conservative		Swing		

=== Street South ===
Street South (2 seats)
Party	Candidate	Votes	%	±%
Liberal Democrats	Liz Leyshon	883	72.6	
Liberal Democrats	Simon Michael Carswell	740	60.9	
Conservative	Bryan Beha *	368	30.3	
Conservative	Sebastian Alexander Johns	258	21.2	
Turnout		1,216	33.1	–32.2
Liberal Democrats hold		Swing		
Liberal Democrats gain from Independent		Swing		

Bryan Beha was elected as a Liberal Democrat in 2015.

=== Street West ===
Street West
Party	Candidate	Votes	%	±%
Conservative	Terry William Napper *	327	52.8	–11.7
Liberal Democrats	Adam Sen *	246	39.7	+4.2
Labour	Andy Merryfield	46	7.4	N/A
Majority		81	13.1	–15.9
Turnout		629	34.4	–36.6
Conservative hold		Swing		

=== The Pennards and Ditcheat ===
The Pennards and Ditcheat
Party	Candidate	Votes	%	±%
Conservative	John Howard Greenhalgh *	400	51.8	–11.8
Liberal Democrats	Rob Reed	201	26.0	–10.4
Independent	Paul James Chant	110	14.2	N/A
Labour	Robert McKie	61	7.9	N/A
Majority		199	25.8	–1.3
Turnout		777	39.7	–28.9
Conservative hold		Swing		

=== Wells Central ===
Wells Central
Party	Candidate	Votes	%	±%
Liberal Democrats	Virginia Lois Rogers	500	61.7	+26.0
Conservative	John North *	247	30.5	–11.0
Labour Co-op	Gill Pettitt	63	7.8	N/A
Majority		253	31.2	N/A
Turnout		830	46.2	–25.3
Liberal Democrats gain from Conservative		Swing		

=== Wells St Cuthbert's ===
Wells St Cuthbert's (2 seats)
Party	Candidate	Votes	%	±%
Liberal Democrats	Rob Ayres	670	46.6	
Liberal Democrats	Laura Jayne Waters	635	44.2	
Conservative	John Derek Osman *	591	41.1	
Conservative	Harvey Siggs *	553	38.5	
Labour	Jennifer Anne Williams	247	17.2	
Turnout		1,437	42.3	–26.0
Liberal Democrats gain from Conservative		Swing		
Liberal Democrats gain from Conservative		Swing		

=== Wells St Thomas' ===
Wells St Thomas' (2 seats)
Party	Candidate	Votes	%	±%
Liberal Democrats	Tom Ronan	939	59.7	
Liberal Democrats	Caroline Louise Foss McKinnell	934	59.3	
Conservative	Richard James Greenwell	480	30.5	
Conservative	Sarah Frances Sloan	435	27.6	
Labour Co-op	Eileen Vivian Webber	164	10.4	N/A
Turnout		1,574	47.4	–26.4
Liberal Democrats hold		Swing		
Liberal Democrats hold		Swing		

=== Wookey and St Cuthbert Out West ===
Wookey and St Cuthbert Out West
Party	Candidate	Votes	%	±%
Liberal Democrats	Lucie Claire Taylor Hood	322	41.7	+6.1
Conservative	Nigel Philip Taylor *	294	38.0	–12.0
Green	Mark Christopher Montgomery	157	20.3	+5.8
Majority		28	3.6	N/A
Turnout		782	37.7	–34.9
Liberal Democrats gain from Conservative		Swing		

== By-elections ==
=== Wells St. Thomas ===
A by-election was held in Wells St Thomas’ ward after the resignation of Liberal Democrat councillor Caroline McKinnell. Due to an error in their nomination papers, the Liberal Democrats failed to defend the seat.

Wells St Thomas' By-Election 6 May 2021
Party	Candidate	Votes	%	±%
Conservative	Tanys Eileen Pullin	887	58.0	+27.5
Labour	Adam David Fyfe	642	42.0	+31.6
Majority		245	16.0	N/A
Turnout		1,529		
Conservative gain from Liberal Democrats		Swing		

=== Butleigh and Baltonsborough ===
Butleigh and Baltonsborough: 6 October 2022
Party	Candidate	Votes	%	±%
Conservative	Ken Maddock	393	50.3	−2.3
Liberal Democrats	Claire Sully	389	49.7	+16.4
Majority		4	0.6	
Turnout		782	39.0	
Conservative hold		Swing	▼9.4	

The by-election was triggered by the death of Conservative councillor Nigel Woollcombe-Adams, who had represented the ward since 1991, on 12 July 2022.
