= 2015 Mendip District Council election =

2015 UK local government election

| ← 2011 | 7 May 2015 | 2019 → |

All 47 seats to Mendip District Council 24 seats needed for a majority
| | First party | Second party |
|---|---|---|
| | Con | LD |
| Party | Conservative | Liberal Democrats |
| Last election | 31 seats, 43.2% | 15 seats, 36.0% |
| Seats won | 32 | 11 |
| Seat change | ▲1 | ▼4 |
| Popular vote | 34,023 | 24,229 |
| Percentage | 43.3% | 30.8% |
| Swing | ▲0.1% | ▼5.2% |
| | Third party | Fourth party |
| | Grn | Ind |
| Party | Green | Independent |
| Last election | 0 seats, 3.7% | 1 seat, 1.7% |
| Seats won | 3 | 1 |
| Seat change | ▲3 | Steady |
| Popular vote | 10,273 | 1,308 |
| Percentage | 13.1% | 1.7% |
| Swing | ▲9.4% | ▼6.0% |
- Map showing the results of the 2015 Mendip District Council following the election.
Council control before election
Conservative
Council control after election
Conservative

The 2015 Mendip District Council election took place on 7 May 2015 to elect members of Mendip District Council in England. This was the same day as other local elections and the general election to the House of Commons of the United Kingdom. As Mendip District councillors were elected on a 4-year term, the next election took place in May 2019.

== Election results ==
Mendip District Council Election, 2015
| Party | Seats | Gains | Losses | Net gain/loss | Seats % | Votes % | Votes | +/− |
|---|---|---|---|---|---|---|---|---|
| Conservative | 32 | | | +1 | 67.39 | 43.3 | 34,023 | |
| Liberal Democrats | 11 | | | −4 | 23.91 | 30.8 | 24,229 | |
| Green | 3 | | | +3 | 6.52 | 13.1 | 10,273 | |
| Independent | 1 | | | +/−0 | 2.17 | 1.7 | 1,308 | |
| Labour | 0 | | | +/−0 | 0.00 | 6.3 | 4,922 | |
| UKIP | 0 | | | +/−0 | 0.00 | 5.0 | 3,906 | |

== Ward results ==
The ward results listed below are based on the changes from the 2011 elections not taking into account any party defections or by-elections. Sitting councillors are marked with an asterisk (*).

=== Ammerdown ===
Ammerdown
| Party | Candidate | Votes | % | ±% |
|---|---|---|---|---|
| Conservative | Edward Drewe * | 639 | 45.6 | –8.8 |
| Liberal Democrats | Josh Burr | 481 | 34.3 | –11.3 |
| Green | Alison Barkshire | 282 | 20.1 | N/A |
| Majority | | 158 | 11.3 | +2.4 |
| Turnout | | | 73.32 | +19.39 |
| Conservative hold | | Swing | | |

=== Ashwick, Chilcompton and Stratton ===
Ashwick, Chilcompton and Stratton (2 seats)
| Party | Candidate | Votes | % | ±% |
|---|---|---|---|---|
| Conservative | Rachel Carter | 1,134 | 41.0 | –18.9 |
| Conservative | John Carter * | 1,114 | – | |
| Liberal Democrats | Fern Thomas | 1,034 | 38.1 | N/A |
| UKIP | Martin Longley | 578 | 20.9 | N/A |
| Turnout | | | 71.04 | +23.69 |
| Conservative hold | | Swing | | |
| Conservative hold | | Swing | | |

=== Beckington and Selwood ===
Beckington and Selwood
| Party | Candidate | Votes | % | ±% |
|---|---|---|---|---|
| Conservative | Clive Mockford | 713 | 57.0 | –5.8 |
| Liberal Democrats | David Wright | 287 | 23.0 | –14.2 |
| Green | Rebecca Yeo | 250 | 20.0 | N/A |
| Majority | | 426 | 34.1 | +8.5 |
| Turnout | | | 73.09 | +17.21 |
| Conservative hold | | Swing | | |

=== Butleigh and Baltonsborough ===
Butleigh and Baltonsborough
| Party | Candidate | Votes | % | ±% |
|---|---|---|---|---|
| Conservative | Nigel Woollcombe-Adams * | 831 | 60.9 | –3.4 |
| Liberal Democrats | Lynsey Stacey | 539 | 39.1 | +3.4 |
| Majority | | 292 | 21.3 | –7.3 |
| Turnout | | | 75.24 | +16.94 |
| Conservative hold | | Swing | | |

=== Chewton Mendip and Ston Easton ===
Chewton Mendip and Ston Easton
| Party | Candidate | Votes | % | ±% |
|---|---|---|---|---|
| Conservative | Tom Killen * | unnopposed | N/A | N/A |
| Conservative hold | | | | |

=== Coleford and Holcombe ===
Coleford and Holcombe (2 seats)
| Party | Candidate | Votes | % | ±% |
|---|---|---|---|---|
| Conservative | Philip Ham * | 1,181 | 46.9 | –7.7 |
| Conservative | Alan Townsend | 1,129 | – | |
| Green | Melanie Moulding | 486 | 19.3 | N/A |
| Green | Tony Mayell | 472 | – | |
| UKIP | Aaron Foot | 433 | 17.2 | N/A |
| Liberal Democrats | Andrew Eyers | 419 | 16.6 | –28.8 |
| Liberal Democrats | Brian Potter | 333 | – | |
| Turnout | | | 68.76 | +16.35 |
| Conservative hold | | Swing | | |
| Conservative hold | | Swing | | |

=== Cranmore, Doulting and Nunney ===
Cranmore, Doulting and Nunney
| Party | Candidate | Votes | % | ±% |
|---|---|---|---|---|
| Conservative | David Van Dyk | 615 | 46.1 | +7.4 |
| Liberal Democrats | Ann Crowcombe | 553 | 41.5 | –11.0 |
| UKIP | Barry Harding | 166 | 12.4 | N/A |
| Majority | | 62 | 4.6 | N/A |
| Turnout | | | 72.61 | +17.55 |
| Conservative gain from Liberal Democrats | | Swing | | |

=== Creech ===
Creech
| Party | Candidate | Votes | % | ±% |
|---|---|---|---|---|
| Conservative | Peter Bradshaw * | 699 | 55.1 | +3.6 |
| Liberal Democrats | Robert Reed | 377 | 29.7 | –12.2 |
| Green | Jane Abrahall | 193 | 15.2 | N/A |
| Majority | | 322 | 25.4 | +15.8 |
| Turnout | | | 66.77 | +10.17 |
| Conservative hold | | Swing | | |

=== Croscombe and Pilton ===
Croscombe and Pilton
| Party | Candidate | Votes | % | ±% |
|---|---|---|---|---|
| Conservative | Nigel Hewitt-Cooper * | 854 | 57.9 | +0.1 |
| Liberal Democrats | Sarah Cairncross | 621 | 42.1 | +13.6 |
| Majority | | 233 | 15.8 | –13.6 |
| Turnout | | | 70.45 | +15.89 |
| Conservative hold | | Swing | | |

=== Frome Berkley Down ===
Frome Berkley Down (2 seats)
| Party | Candidate | Votes | % | ±% |
|---|---|---|---|---|
| Conservative | Eve Berry | 845 | 39.2 | –8.7 |
| Conservative | Joanna Beale | 784 | – | |
| Liberal Democrats | Tracey Rustell | 603 | 28.0 | –24.1 |
| Liberal Democrats | Alex Brown | 451 | – | |
| UKIP | Adrian Dobinson * | 386 | 17.9 | N/A |
| Green | Emma Russell | 322 | 14.9 | N/A |
| UKIP | Edwina Larner | 317 | – | |
| Green | Gordon Housley | 279 | – | |
| Turnout | | | 63.71 | +20.30 |
| Conservative gain from Liberal Democrats | | Swing | | |
| Conservative gain from Liberal Democrats | | Swing | | |

Adrian Dobinson was elected as a Liberal Democrat in 2011

=== Frome College ===
Frome College (2 seats)
| Party | Candidate | Votes | % | ±% |
|---|---|---|---|---|
| Conservative | Mike Rideout | 962 | 38.3 | +0.6 |
| Liberal Democrats | Adam Boyden * | 922 | 36.7 | –4.4 |
| Conservative | Carole Bullen * | 846 | – | |
| Liberal Democrats | Alex Shingler | 669 | – | |
| Green | Tim Cutting | 359 | 14.3 | N/A |
| Labour | Gerry Hampson | 266 | 10.6 | N/A |
| Green | Daniel Hurring | 239 | – | |
| Turnout | | | 68.11 | +20.61 |
| Conservative hold | | Swing | | |
| Liberal Democrats hold | | Swing | | |

=== Frome Keyford ===
Frome Keyford (2 seats)
| Party | Candidate | Votes | % | ±% |
|---|---|---|---|---|
| Green | Shane Collins | 919 | 29.1 | N/A |
| Liberal Democrats | Alvin Horsfall * | 795 | 25.2 | –28.6 |
| Green | Marc Peel | 657 | – | |
| Conservative | Felix Fitzpatrick | 596 | 18.9 | +0.9 |
| Liberal Democrats | Richard Pinnock * | 562 | – | |
| Labour | David Oakensen | 456 | 14.5 | –13.7 |
| UKIP | Terry Latchem | 389 | 12.3 | N/A |
| Turnout | | | 61.33 | +17.24 |
| Green gain from Liberal Democrats | | Swing | | |
| Liberal Democrats hold | | Swing | | |

=== Frome Market ===
Frome Market (2 seats)
| Party | Candidate | Votes | % | ±% |
|---|---|---|---|---|
| Green | Des Harris | 875 | 34.9 | +19.8 |
| Green | Stina Falle | 799 | – | |
| Conservative | John Oliver | 665 | 26.5 | +6.9 |
| Liberal Democrats | Alan Glover | 545 | 21.7 | –8.3 |
| Liberal Democrats | Criss Glover | 486 | – | |
| Labour | Blanche Farley | 425 | 16.9 | +1.7 |
| Turnout | | | 62.44 | +21.84 |
| Green gain from Liberal Democrats | | Swing | | |
| Green gain from Liberal Democrats | | Swing | | |

=== Frome Oakfield ===
Frome Oakfield
| Party | Candidate | Votes | % | ±% |
|---|---|---|---|---|
| Liberal Democrats | Helen Sprawson-White | 488 | 38.2 | –23.5 |
| Green | Corinne Sutterby | 287 | 22.4 | N/A |
| Conservative | Hilary Thomas | 246 | 19.2 | +1.0 |
| UKIP | Samantha Latchem | 141 | 11.0 | N/A |
| Labour | Theresa Clark | 117 | 9.1 | –11.0 |
| Majority | | 201 | 15.7 | –25.9 |
| Turnout | | | 64.93 | +20.33 |
| Liberal Democrats hold | | Swing | | |

=== Frome Park ===
Frome Park (2 seats)
| Party | Candidate | Votes | % | ±% |
|---|---|---|---|---|
| Liberal Democrats | Claire Hudson * | 874 | 33.5 | –12.0 |
| Liberal Democrats | Damon Hooton * | 842 | – | |
| Conservative | Charles Wood | 783 | 30.0 | +2.1 |
| Labour | Catherine Richardson | 507 | 19.4 | –7.2 |
| UKIP | Sharon Snook * | 443 | 17.0 | N/A |
| UKIP | Derek Tanswell * | 435 | – | N/A |
| Turnout | | | 61.71 | +19.32 |
| Liberal Democrats hold | | Swing | | |
| Liberal Democrats hold | | Swing | | |

Sharon Snook and Derek Tanswell were both elected in the Frome Market ward as Liberal Democrats in 2011

=== Glastonbury St Benedict's ===
Glastonbury St Benedict's
| Party | Candidate | Votes | % | ±% |
|---|---|---|---|---|
| Conservative | Stephen Henderson * | 549 | 45.4 | +1.8 |
| Green | Paul Sander-Jackson | 483 | 40.0 | +17.3 |
| Labour | Andy Merryfield | 177 | 14.6 | +5.5 |
| Majority | | 66 | 5.5 | –13.4 |
| Turnout | | | 59.94 | +17.30 |
| Conservative hold | | Swing | | |

=== Glastonbury St Edmund's ===
Glastonbury St Edmund's
| Party | Candidate | Votes | % | ±% |
|---|---|---|---|---|
| Liberal Democrats | Nick Cottle * | 447 | 36.3 | –7.2 |
| Green | Jon Cousins | 443 | 36.0 | N/A |
| Conservative | Jim Barron | 340 | 27.6 | +16.3 |
| Majority | | 4 | 0.3 | –16.2 |
| Turnout | | | 71.03 | +22.69 |
| Liberal Democrats hold | | Swing | | |

=== Glastonbury St John's ===
Glastonbury St John's
| Party | Candidate | Votes | % | ±% |
|---|---|---|---|---|
| Conservative | John Coles * | 642 | 55.8 | +25.3 |
| Green | Sarah Sander-Jackson | 509 | 44.2 | +31.0 |
| Majority | | 133 | 11.6 | +3.4 |
| Turnout | | | 64.43 | +15.86 |
| Conservative hold | | Swing | | |

=== Glastonbury St Mary's ===
Glastonbury St Mary's
| Party | Candidate | Votes | % | ±% |
|---|---|---|---|---|
| Conservative | John Brunsdon * | 509 | 41.4 | –12.3 |
| Green | Lindsay Macdougall | 342 | 27.8 | +1.4 |
| Liberal Democrats | Laiqa Browne | 271 | 22.1 | +2.2 |
| UKIP | Glen Tucker | 107 | 8.7 | N/A |
| Majority | | 167 | 13.6 | –13.7 |
| Turnout | | | 72.14 | +18.09 |
| Conservative hold | | Swing | | |

=== Moor ===
Moor
| Party | Candidate | Votes | % | ±% |
|---|---|---|---|---|
| Conservative | Graham Noel * | 916 | 62.9 | +9.0 |
| Liberal Democrats | Maurice Holdstock | 540 | 37.1 | +17.2 |
| Majority | | 376 | 25.8 | –0.5 |
| Turnout | | | 71.61 | +22.88 |
| Conservative hold | | Swing | | |

=== Postlebury ===
Postlebury
| Party | Candidate | Votes | % | ±% |
|---|---|---|---|---|
| Conservative | Dick Skidmore | 700 | 52.2 | +0.5 |
| Green | Michael Gay | 344 | 25.7 | N/A |
| Liberal Democrats | Jonathan Roberts | 297 | 22.1 | –13.6 |
| Majority | | 356 | 26.5 | +10.5 |
| Turnout | | | 76.95 | +16.60 |
| Conservative hold | | Swing | | |

=== Rode and Norton St. Philip ===
Rode and Norton St. Philip
| Party | Candidate | Votes | % | ±% |
|---|---|---|---|---|
| Conservative | Linda Oliver | 1,026 | 70.0 | +8.3 |
| Liberal Democrats | Christine Cockroft | 439 | 30.0 | –8.3 |
| Majority | | 587 | 40.1 | +16.8 |
| Turnout | | | 78.90 | +16.58 |
| Conservative hold | | Swing | | |

=== Rodney and Westbury ===
Rodney and Westbury
| Party | Candidate | Votes | % | ±% |
|---|---|---|---|---|
| Liberal Democrats | Ros Wyke | 674 | 47.4 | +1.3 |
| Conservative | Rachel Thompson | 624 | 43.9 | –4.4 |
| UKIP | Errol Chandler | 123 | 8.7 | +3.2 |
| Majority | | 50 | 3.5 | N/A |
| Turnout | | | 79.45 | +16.82 |
| Liberal Democrats gain from Conservative | | Swing | | |

=== Shepton East ===
Shepton East (2 seats)
| Party | Candidate | Votes | % | ±% |
|---|---|---|---|---|
| Conservative | Bente Height * | 922 | 45.0 | +9.9 |
| Conservative | Jeannette Marsh * | 866 | – | |
| Liberal Democrats | Martin Lovell | 735 | 35.9 | +6.0 |
| Liberal Democrats | Deborah Losey | 708 | – | |
| Labour | John Gilham | 393 | 19.2 | +7.0 |
| Labour | Deborah Towner | 351 | – | |
| Turnout | | | 57.79 | +16.05 |
| Conservative hold | | Swing | | |
| Conservative hold | | Swing | | |

=== Shepton West ===
Shepton West (2 seats)
| Party | Candidate | Votes | % | ±% |
|---|---|---|---|---|
| Conservative | John Parham * | 907 | 36.8 | +7.5 |
| Conservative | Simon Davies | 882 | – | |
| Labour | Chris Inchley | 808 | 32.8 | +8.4 |
| Liberal Democrats | Garfield Kennedy | 749 | 30.4 | +4.9 |
| Labour | Matt Drew | 456 | – | |
| Liberal Democrats | Robin Scott | 443 | – | |
| Turnout | | | 62.57 | +15.01 |
| Conservative hold | | Swing | | |
| Conservative gain from Liberal Democrats | | Swing | | |

=== St Cuthbert Out North ===
St Cuthbert Out North
| Party | Candidate | Votes | % | ±% |
|---|---|---|---|---|
| Conservative | Mike Pullin | 715 | 48.8 | –4.1 |
| Independent | Kevin Russell | 383 | 26.1 | N/A |
| Green | Sarah Briton | 202 | 13.8 | –12.4 |
| Liberal Democrats | David Gamon | 166 | 11.3 | –9.6 |
| Majority | | 332 | 22.6 | –4.0 |
| Turnout | | | 74.38 | +21.03 |
| Conservative hold | | Swing | | |

=== Street North ===
Street North (2 seats)
| Party | Candidate | Votes | % | ±% |
|---|---|---|---|---|
| Liberal Democrats | Adam Sen | 957 | 50.3 | +26.4 |
| Conservative | Tim Rice | 946 | 49.7 | +23.1 |
| Conservative | Sophie Baulch | 816 | – | |
| Turnout | | | 61.21 | +24.43 |
| Liberal Democrats gain from Conservative | | Swing | | |
| Conservative hold | | Swing | | |

=== Street South ===
Street South (2 seats)
| Party | Candidate | Votes | % | ±% |
|---|---|---|---|---|
| Liberal Democrats | Bryan Beha * | 974 | 30.4 | +4.0 |
| Independent | Lloyd Hughes * | 925 | 28.9 | –8.0 |
| Conservative | Sally Frise | 803 | 25.1 | +2.5 |
| Conservative | George Steer | 731 | – | |
| Green | Kara Bryan | 503 | 15.7 | N/A |
| Turnout | | | 65.25 | +23.49 |
| Liberal Democrats hold | | Swing | | |
| Independent hold | | Swing | | |

=== Street West ===
Street West
| Party | Candidate | Votes | % | ±% |
|---|---|---|---|---|
| Conservative | Terry Napper * | 791 | 64.5 | +3.7 |
| Liberal Democrats | Rachael Clarke | 435 | 35.5 | –3.7 |
| Majority | | 356 | 29.0 | +7.4 |
| Turnout | | | 71.00 | +25.70 |
| Conservative hold | | Swing | | |

=== The Pennards and Ditcheat ===
The Pennards and Ditcheat
| Party | Candidate | Votes | % | ±% |
|---|---|---|---|---|
| Conservative | John Greenhalgh | 869 | 63.6 | –1.8 |
| Liberal Democrats | Ross Kessell | 498 | 36.4 | +1.8 |
| Majority | | 371 | 27.1 | –3.7 |
| Turnout | | | 68.59 | +16.22 |
| Conservative hold | | Swing | | |

=== Wells Central ===
Wells Central
| Party | Candidate | Votes | % | ±% |
|---|---|---|---|---|
| Conservative | John North * | 494 | 41.5 | –2.5 |
| Liberal Democrats | Tony Robbins | 424 | 35.7 | +3.1 |
| Green | Chris Briton | 271 | 22.8 | +10.8 |
| Majority | | 70 | 5.9 | –5.5 |
| Turnout | | | 71.49 | +15.76 |
| Conservative hold | | Swing | | |

=== Wells St Cuthbert's ===
Wells St Cuthbert's (2 seats)
| Party | Candidate | Votes | % | ±% |
|---|---|---|---|---|
| Conservative | John Osman * | 941 | 35.3 | –0.8 |
| Conservative | Harvey Siggs * | 837 | – | |
| Liberal Democrats | Norman Kennedy | 763 | 28.6 | +13.0 |
| Labour | Colin Price | 576 | 21.6 | +1.8 |
| Labour | Tatiana Storie | 390 | – | |
| UKIP | Les Bate | 388 | 14.5 | N/A |
| Turnout | | | 68.26 | |
| Conservative hold | | Swing | | |
| Conservative hold | | Swing | | |

=== Wells St Thomas' ===
Wells St Thomas' (2 seats)
| Party | Candidate | Votes | % | ±% |
|---|---|---|---|---|
| Liberal Democrats | Danny Unwin * | 1,172 | 44.1 | +7.1 |
| Liberal Democrats | Roy Mackenzie | 1,123 | – | |
| Conservative | Celia Wride | 938 | 35.3 | –0.9 |
| Conservative | David Baker | 895 | – | |
| Green | Maddy Milnes | 546 | 20.6 | +5.2 |
| Turnout | | | 73.78 | +13.51 |
| Liberal Democrats hold | | Swing | | |
| Liberal Democrats gain from Conservative | | Swing | | |

=== Wookey and St Cuthbert Out West ===
Wookey and St Cuthbert Out West
| Party | Candidate | Votes | % | ±% |
|---|---|---|---|---|
| Conservative | Nigel Taylor * | 728 | 50.0 | +4.9 |
| Liberal Democrats | Stephen Harrison | 518 | 35.6 | –1.8 |
| Green | Rachael Wood | 211 | 14.5 | N/A |
| Majority | | 210 | 14.4 | +6.7 |
| Turnout | | | 72.63 | +17.14 |
| Conservative hold | | Swing | | |
