= 2011 Mendip District Council election =

2011 UK local government election

The 2011 Mendip District Council election was held on Thursday 5 May 2011 to elect all 47 members of Mendip District Council to a four-year term, the same day as other local elections in the United Kingdom. It was preceded by the 2007 election and followed by the 2015 election. The Conservative Party gained the council out of no overall control. Turnout across the council was 50.6%.

== Results summary ==
2011 Mendip District Council election
Party	Seats	Net gain/loss	Seats %	Votes %	Votes	+/−
Conservative	31	▲7	66.0			
Liberal Democrats	15	▼8	31.9			
Independent	1	▲1	2.1			
Labour	0	Steady	0.0			
Green	0	Steady	0.0			
UKIP	0	Steady	0.0			

== Ward results ==
=== Ammerdown ===
Ammerdown (1 seat)
Party	Candidate	Votes	%	±%
Conservative	Edward Drewe	535	54.6	▼9.9
Liberal Democrats	Jill Dillamore	444	45.4	▲9.9
Majority		91	9.3	▼19.7
Total valid votes		979	51.5	
Turnout			53.9	
Registered electors		1,900		
Conservative hold		Swing	▼9.9	

=== Ashwick, Chilcompton and Stratton ===
Ashwick, Chilcompton and Stratton (2 seats)
Party	Candidate	Votes	%	±%
Conservative	Steven Priscott (Note: Steven Priscott was elected in a 21 October 2010 by-election following the resignation of Conservative incumbent Maxine Oxford.)	882		
Conservative	Wayne Closier	816		
Labour	Roger Anderson	590		
Turnout			47.4	
Registered electors		3,550		
Conservative hold				
Conservative hold				

=== Beckington and Selwood ===
Beckington and Selwood (1 seat)
Party	Candidate	Votes	%	±%
Conservative	Peter Knibbs	587	62.8	▲13.2
Liberal Democrats	Christine Cockroft (Note: Christine Cockroft was elected to Frome College ward as a candidate for the Liberal Democrats in 2007.)	348	37.2	▼13.2
Majority		239	25.6	N/A
Total valid votes		935	54.6	
Turnout			55.9	
Registered electors		1,713		
Conservative gain from Liberal Democrats		Swing	▲13.2	

=== Butleigh and Baltonsborough ===
Butleigh and Baltonsborough (1 seat)
Party	Candidate	Votes	%	±%
Conservative	Nigel Woollcombe-Adams (Note: Nigel Woollcombe-Adams was elected to The Pennards and Ditcheat ward as the Conservative candidate in 2007.)	668	64.3	▼2.6
Liberal Democrats	Alan Glover	371	35.7	▲12.2
Majority		297	28.6	▼14.8
Total valid votes		1,039	57.0	
Turnout			58.3	
Registered electors		1,823		
Conservative hold		Swing	▼7.4	

=== Chewton Mendip and Ston Easton ===
Chewton Mendip and Ston Easton (1 seat)
Party	Candidate	Votes	%	±%
Conservative	Tom Killen*	747	74.6	▲1.2
Liberal Democrats	Chantal Allison	185	18.5	▼0.9
UKIP	Gwyn Thomas	69	6.9	▼0.4
Majority		562	56.1	▲2.1
Total valid votes		1,001	57.5	
Turnout			58.4	
Registered electors		1,742		
Conservative hold		Swing	▲1.0	

=== Coleford and Holcombe ===
Coleford and Holcombe (2 seats)
Party	Candidate	Votes	%	±%
Conservative	Philip Ham*	985		
Conservative	Valerie Horler	889		
Liberal Democrats	Robin Bradbury	818		
Liberal Democrats	Robin Cramp	800		
Turnout			52.4	
Registered electors		3,751		
Conservative hold				
Conservative gain from Liberal Democrats				

=== Cranmore, Doulting and Nunney ===
Cranmore, Doulting and Nunney (1 seat)
Party	Candidate	Votes	%	±%
Liberal Democrats	Gloria Cawood*	528	52.5	▲4.5
Conservative	Dick Skidmore (Note: Dick Skidmore was elected to Postlebury ward as the Conservative candidate in 2007.)	389	38.7	▲1.2
Labour	David Redgewell	88	8.8	▲5.6
Majority		139	13.8	▲3.2
Total valid votes		1,005	54.1	
Turnout			55.1	
Registered electors		1,859		
Liberal Democrats hold		Swing	▲1.6	

=== Creech ===
Creech (1 seat)
Party	Candidate	Votes	%	±%
Conservative	Peter Bradshaw	541	51.5	▲8.7
Liberal Democrats	Robert Reed*	440	41.9	▼11.7
Labour	Hazel Inchley	70	6.7	▲3.0
Majority		101	9.6	N/A
Total valid votes		1,051	56.3	
Turnout			56.6	
Registered electors		1,867		
Conservative gain from Liberal Democrats		Swing	▲10.2	

=== Croscombe and Pilton ===
Croscombe and Pilton (1 seat)
Party	Candidate	Votes	%	±%
Conservative	Nigel Hewitt-Cooper*	620	57.8	▼7.7
Liberal Democrats	Richard Varley	305	28.5	▲3.2
Labour	Kayleigh Ashton	147	13.7	▲4.5
Majority		315	29.4	▼10.9
Total valid votes		1,072	53.2	
Turnout			54.6	
Registered electors		2,016		
Conservative hold		Swing	▼5.4	

=== Frome Berkley Down ===
Frome Berkley Down (2 seats)
Party	Candidate	Votes	%	±%
Liberal Democrats	Sam Phripp	743		
Liberal Democrats	Adrian Dobinson*	722		
Conservative	Tony Barnes (Note: Tony Barnes was elected to Rode and Norton St. Philip ward as the Conservative candidate in 2007.)	682		
Conservative	Michael Rideout	610		
Turnout			43.4	
Registered electors		3,526		
Liberal Democrats hold				
Liberal Democrats hold				

=== Frome College ===
Frome College (2 seats)
Party	Candidate	Votes	%	±%
Liberal Democrats	Adam Boyden	712		
Conservative	Carole Bullen	653		
Liberal Democrats	Geoff Cardnell	614		
Conservative	James Godman	577		
Independent	Andrew Earle* (Note: Andrew Earle was elected in 2007 as a candidate for the Liberal Democrats, but ran for reelection as an independent.)	369		
Turnout			47.5	
Registered electors				
Liberal Democrats hold				
Conservative gain from Liberal Democrats				

=== Frome Keyford ===
Frome Keyford (2 seats)
Party	Candidate	Votes	%	±%
Liberal Democrats	Alvin Horsfall*	873		
Liberal Democrats	Richard Pinnock	732		
Labour	David Oakensen	458		
Conservative	Felix Fitzpatrick	292		
Conservative	Evelyn Berry	280		
Turnout			44.1	
Registered electors		3,524		
Liberal Democrats hold				
Liberal Democrats hold				

=== Frome Market ===
Frome Market (2 seats)
Party	Candidate	Votes	%	±%
Liberal Democrats	Sharon Snook	503		
Liberal Democrats	Derek Tanswell	456		
Independent	Richard Porteous	336		
Conservative	Pam Lee	329		
Conservative	Gordon Alexander	314		
Independent	Tim O'Connor	278		
Labour	Theresa Clark	255		
Green	Emma Russell	254		
Green	Rebecca Yeo	209		
Turnout			40.6	
Registered electors		3,887		
Liberal Democrats hold				
Liberal Democrats hold				

=== Frome Oakfield ===
Frome Oakfield (1 seat)
Party	Candidate	Votes	%	±%
Liberal Democrats	Helen Sprawson-White	537	61.7	▼3.2
Labour	Catherine Richardson	175	20.1	New
Conservative	Buckley Cypher	158	18.2	▼16.9
Majority		362	41.6	▲11.7
Total valid votes		870	43.9	
Turnout			44.6	
Registered electors		1,983		
Liberal Democrats hold		Swing	▼11.7	

=== Frome Park ===
Frome Park (2 seats)
Party	Candidate	Votes	%	±%
Liberal Democrats	Damon Hooton*	736		
Liberal Democrats	Claire Hudson*	733		
Conservative	Hilary Thomas	452		
Conservative	Charles Wood	445		
Turnout			42.4	
Registered electors		3,846		
Liberal Democrats hold				
Liberal Democrats hold				

=== Glastonbury St. Benedict's ===
Glastonbury St. Benedict's (1 seat)
Party	Candidate	Votes	%	±%
Conservative	Steve Henderson	355	43.6	▼9.8
Liberal Democrats	Paul Preston	201	24.7	▼22.0
Green	Denis Michell	185	22.7	New
Labour	Lesley Ullman	74	9.1	New
Majority		154	18.9	▲12.3
Total valid votes		815	42.2	
Turnout			42.6	
Registered electors		1,930		
Conservative hold		Swing	▲6.1	

=== Glastonbury St. Edmund's ===
Glastonbury St. Edmund's (1 seat)
Party	Candidate	Votes	%	±%
Liberal Democrats	Nicholas Cottle*	363	43.5	▼11.8
Independent	Louise Somerville Williams	225	27.0	New
Labour	Kenneth Hurrell	152	18.2	New
Conservative	Peter Wood-Frearson	94	11.3	▼33.4
Majority		138	16.6	▲5.8
Total valid votes		834	47.0	
Turnout			48.3	
Registered electors		1,773		
Liberal Democrats hold		Swing	▼19.4	

=== Glastonbury St. John's ===
Glastonbury St. John's (1 seat)
Party	Candidate	Votes	%	±%
Conservative	John Coles*	235	30.5	▼16.6
Independent	Michael Free	172	22.3	▼1.4
Liberal Democrats	Steven Boswell	115	14.9	▼14.2
Green	Linda Benfield	102	13.2	New
Independent	Malcolm Higgins	90	11.7	New
Labour	Peter Trueman	56	7.3	New
Majority		63	8.2	▼9.9
Total valid votes		770	47.9	
Turnout			48.6	
Registered electors		1,608		
Conservative hold		Swing	▼7.6	

=== Glastonbury St. Mary's ===
Glastonbury St. Mary's (1 seat)
Party	Candidate	Votes	%	±%
Conservative	John Brunsdon	492	53.7	▼5.3
Green	Ian Forster	242	26.4	New
Liberal Democrats	Kevin Mitchell	182	19.9	▼21.1
Majority		250	27.3	▲9.2
Total valid votes		916	52.9	
Turnout			54.1	
Registered electors		1,730		
Conservative hold		Swing	▼15.9	

=== Moor ===
Moor (1 seat)
Party	Candidate	Votes	%	±%
Conservative	Graham Noel	520	53.9	▲3.2
Independent	Leslie Bennett* (Note: Leslie Bennett was elected as the Conservative candidate to Moor in 2007, but ran for reelection as an independent.)	266	27.6	New
Liberal Democrats	Adam Sen	179	18.5	▼30.8
Majority		254	26.3	▲25.0
Total valid votes		965	48.3	
Turnout			48.7	
Registered electors		1,998		
Conservative hold		Swing	▼12.2	

=== The Pennards and Ditcheat ===
The Pennards and Ditcheat (1 seat)
Party	Candidate	Votes	%	±%
Conservative	John Crossley	648	65.4	▼3.5
Liberal Democrats	Stephen Irish	343	34.6	▲3.5
Majority		305	30.8	▼6.9
Total valid votes		991	50.7	
Turnout			52.4	
Registered electors		1,956		
Conservative hold		Swing	▼3.5	

=== Postlebury ===
Postlebury (1 seat)
Party	Candidate	Votes	%	±%
Conservative	David Stevens	526	51.7	▼12.1
Liberal Democrats	Michael Clark	363	35.7	▼0.6
Independent	Niall Warry	129	12.7	New
Majority		163	16.0	▼11.4
Total valid votes		1,018	59.5	
Turnout			60.4	
Registered electors		1,710		
Conservative hold		Swing	▼5.7	

=== Rode and Norton St. Philip ===
Rode and Norton St. Philip (1 seat)
Party	Candidate	Votes	%	±%
Conservative	Matthew Ellis*	674	61.7	▲11.2
Liberal Democrats	Gus Colquhoun	419	38.3	▼11.2
Majority		255	23.3	▲22.3
Total valid votes		1,093	61.7	
Turnout			62.3	
Registered electors		1,772		
Conservative hold		Swing	▲11.2	

=== Rodney and Westbury ===
Rodney and Westbury (1 seat)
Party	Candidate	Votes	%	±%
Conservative	Julie Baker	527	48.3	▼13.4
Liberal Democrats	Ros Wyke	503	46.1	▲7.9
UKIP	Jake Baynes	60	5.5	New
Majority		24	2.2	▼21.4
Total valid votes		1,090	61.8	
Turnout			62.6	
Registered electors		1,763		
Conservative hold		Swing	▼10.7	

=== Shepton East ===
Shepton East (2 seats)
Party	Candidate	Votes	%	±%
Conservative	Bente Height	538		
Conservative	Jeannette Marsh	533		
Liberal Democrats	Bob Champion	458		
Liberal Democrats	Sarah Yong	416		
Independent	Will Dunscombe	349		
Independent	Susan Gibbs	268		
Labour	Deborah Towner	187		
Labour	Terry Morgan	179		
Turnout			41.7	
Registered electors		3,766		
Conservative hold				
Conservative hold				

=== Shepton West ===
Shepton West (2 seats)
Party	Candidate	Votes	%	±%
Conservative	John Parham*	565		
Liberal Democrats	Sue Cook	491		
Liberal Democrats	Garfield Kennedy	479		
Labour	Chris Inchley	471		
Conservative	Derek Marvin	469		
Independent	Jeff Curtis	400		
Labour	John Gilham	379		
Turnout			47.6	
Registered electors		3,749		
Conservative hold				
Liberal Democrats gain from Conservative				

=== St. Cuthbert Out North ===
St. Cuthbert Out North (1 seat)
Party	Candidate	Votes	%	±%
Conservative	Ron Forrest*	542	52.9	▼8.9
Green	Kate Briton	269	26.2	▲5.3
Liberal Democrats	David Gamon	214	20.9	▲3.6
Majority		273	26.6	▼14.2
Total valid votes		1,025	52.5	
Turnout			53.4	
Registered electors		1,951		
Conservative hold		Swing	▼7.1	

=== Street North ===
Street North (2 seats)
Party	Candidate	Votes	%	±%
Conservative	George Steer	324		
Conservative	John Carter	316		
Liberal Democrats	Bob Smith (Note: Bob Smith was elected to Street South ward as the candidate for the Liberal Democrats in 2007.)	291		
Independent	Steven Lukins	267		
Liberal Democrats	Harriet Dilliway	266		
Labour	Trevor Luckhurst	216		
Green	Daven Phelan-Player	121		
Turnout			36.8	
Registered electors		2,934		
Conservative gain from Liberal Democrats				
Conservative gain from Liberal Democrats				

=== Street South ===
Street South (2 seats)
Party	Candidate	Votes	%	±%
Independent	Lloyd Hughes* (Note: Lloyd Hughes was elected as a candidate for the Liberal Democrats in 2007, but ran for reelection as an independent.)	797		
Liberal Democrats	Bryan Beha	569		
Conservative	Elisabeth Genge	488		
Conservative	John Steer	360		
Labour	Williams Roberts	305		
Turnout			41.8	
Registered electors		3,848		
Independent gain from Liberal Democrats				
Liberal Democrats hold				

=== Street West ===
Street West (1 seat)
Party	Candidate	Votes	%	±%
Conservative	Terry Napper	448	60.8	▲38.3
Liberal Democrats	Sally Randall	289	39.2	▼21.8
Majority		159	21.6	N/A
Total valid votes		737	43.6	
Turnout			45.3	
Registered electors		1,692		
Conservative gain from Liberal Democrats		Swing	▲30.1	

=== Wells Central ===
Wells Central (1 seat)
Party	Candidate	Votes	%	±%
Conservative	John North	389	44.0	▼22.6
Liberal Democrats	Denise Boulton	288	32.6	▼0.9
Green	Jennifer Linsdell	106	12.0	New
Labour	Matthew Drew	101	11.4	New
Majority		101	11.4	▼21.7
Total valid votes		884	55.4	
Turnout			55.7	
Registered electors		1,595		
Conservative hold		Swing	▼10.9	

=== Wells St. Cuthbert's ===
Wells St. Cuthbert's (2 seats)
Party	Candidate	Votes	%	±%
Conservative	John Osman*	694		
Conservative	Harvey Siggs*	596		
Labour	Colin Price	381		
Liberal Democrats	Norman Kennedy	300		
Liberal Democrats	Sarah Cairncross	294		
Green	Chris Briton	278		
Independent	John Mitchell	269		
Labour	Tatiana Storie	250		
Turnout			46.9	
Registered electors		3,378		
Conservative hold				
Conservative hold				

=== Wells St. Thomas' ===
Wells St. Thomas' (2 seats)
Party	Candidate	Votes	%	±%
Liberal Democrats	Daniel Unwin*	826		
Conservative	Andy Denison	808		
Liberal Democrats	Roy Mackenzie*	803		
Conservative	Simon Davies	706		
Green	Maddy Milnes	345		
Labour	Glen Newstead	256		
Turnout			60.3	
Registered electors		3,454		
Liberal Democrats hold				
Conservative gain from Liberal Democrats				

=== Wookey and St. Cuthbert Out West ===
Wookey and St. Cuthbert Out West (1 seat)
Party	Candidate	Votes	%	±%
Conservative	Nigel Taylor	489	45.1	▼6.9
Liberal Democrats	Stephen Harrison	405	37.4	▼10.6
Independent	Jane Walker	190	17.5	New
Majority		84	7.7	▲3.7
Total valid votes		1,084	55.1	
Turnout			55.5	
Registered electors		1,967		
Conservative hold		Swing	▲1.9	
