= Mid Devon District Council elections =

Local government elections in Devon, England

Mid Devon District Council elections are held every four years to elect Mid Devon District Council in Devon, England. Since the last boundary changes in 2023 the council has comprised 42 councillors, representing 22 wards, with each ward electing one, two or three councillors.

== Election results ==
Composition of the council
Year	Conservative	Liberal Democrats (Note: Includes totals for the predecessors of the Liberal Democrats, the Liberal Party and SDP (both of which participated in the Alliance).)	Labour	Green (Note: Includes totals for the predecessors of the Green Party of England and Wales, the Ecology Party and Green Party UK.)	Independents & Others	Council control after election
Local government reorganisation; council established (40 seats)
1973	0	5	3	–	32	Independent
1976	0	5	0	0	35	Independent
New ward boundaries (40 seats)
1979	1	1	1	0	37	Independent
1983	0	10	0	0	30	Independent
1987	0	13	0	0	27	Independent
1991	0	9	1	0	30	Independent
1995	0	21	1	0	18	Liberal Democrats
1999	2	18	1	0	19	No overall control
New ward boundaries (42 seats)
2003	11	8	1	0	22	No overall control
2007	17	10	0	0	15	No overall control
2011	24	6	0	0	12	Conservative
2015	28	5	0	0	9 (Note: 6 Independents, 2 UKIP, 1 Liberal)	Conservative
2019	18	12	0	2	10	No overall control
New ward boundaries (42 seats)
2023	5	33	0	3	1	Liberal Democrats

== Results maps ==
2003 results map

2007 results map

2011 results map

2015 results map

2019 results map

2023 results map

== By-election results ==
=== 1995–1999 ===
Canonsley By-Election 11 July 1996
Party	Candidate	Votes	%	±%
Liberal Democrats		249	37.5	
Independent		182	27.4	
Independent		132	20.0	
Labour		100	15.1	
Majority		67	10.1	
Turnout		663		
Liberal Democrats hold		Swing		

Shuttern By-Election 25 September 1997
Party	Candidate	Votes	%	±%
Liberal Democrats		351	48.5	+3.3
Conservative		343	47.4	+47.4
Independent		29	4.0	+4.0
Majority		8	1.1	
Turnout		723		
Liberal Democrats hold		Swing		

Bradninch By-Election 22 January 1998
Party	Candidate	Votes	%	±%
Liberal Democrats		400	55.2	−10.2
Conservative		306	42.2	+20.3
Labour		19	2.6	−10.2
Majority		94	13.0	
Turnout		725	52.6	
Liberal Democrats hold		Swing		

=== 1999–2003 ===
Castle Tiverton By-Election 26 July 2001
Party	Candidate	Votes	%	±%
Conservative		471	48.5	+48.5
Liberal Democrats		376	38.7	−40.4
Labour		124	12.8	−8.1
Majority		95	9.8	
Turnout		971	33.1	
Conservative gain from Liberal Democrats		Swing		

=== 2003–2007 ===
Cullompton South By-Election 1 July 2004
Party	Candidate	Votes	%	±%
Conservative	Clive Francis	255	38.8	+38.8
Liberal Democrats	Kevin Wilson	219	33.3	−5.2
Independent	Raymond Weinstein	101	15.4	
Independent	Christopher Sanderson	82	12.5	
Majority		36	5.5	
Turnout		657	24.2	
Conservative gain from Independent		Swing		

Yeo By-Election 22 June 2006
Party	Candidate	Votes	%	±%
Liberal Democrats	Maximilian Cook	565	59.7	−4.1
Conservative	Peter Hare-Scott	382	40.3	+4.1
Majority		183	19.4	
Turnout		947	38.8	
Liberal Democrats hold		Swing		

=== 2007–2011 ===
Lower Culm By-Election 21 June 2007
Party	Candidate	Votes	%	±%
Conservative		422	43.7	+43.7
Liberal Democrats		287	29.7	+8.0
Independent		181	18.8	−35.4
UKIP		75	7.8	+7.8
Majority		135	14.0	
Turnout		965	22.1	
Conservative gain from Independent		Swing		

Yeo By-Election 25 February 2010
Party	Candidate	Votes	%	±%
Conservative	Derek Coren	714	59.4	+26.4
Liberal Democrats	Peter Heal	489	40.6	−26.4
Majority		225	18.8	
Turnout		1,203	45.0	
Conservative gain from Liberal Democrats		Swing		

=== 2011–2015 ===
Clare and Shuttern By-Election 15 December 2011
Party	Candidate	Votes	%	±%
Conservative	Polly Colthorpe	385	63.6	+4.1
Independent	Terry Knagg	166	27.4	−13.1
UKIP	Tony McIntyre	54	8.9	+8.9
Majority		219	36.2	
Turnout		605		
Conservative hold		Swing		

Way By-Election 26 September 2013
Party	Candidate	Votes	%	±%
Conservative	Cathryn Heal	189	48.0	−25.9
Liberal Democrats	Judi Binks	130	33.0	+33.0
UKIP	Bob Edwards	60	15.2	+15.2
Independent	John Jordan	15	3.8	+3.8
Majority		59	15.0	
Turnout		394		
Conservative hold		Swing		

=== 2015–2019 ===
Westexe By-Election 14 September 2017
Party	Candidate	Votes	%	±%
Conservative	Anthony Bush	279	36.4	+6.6
Independent	Gerald Luxton	179	23.4	+4.7
Labour	Alison Mitchell	164	21.4	+9.6
Liberal Democrats	David Whiteway	144	18.8	+18.8
Majority		100	13.1	
Turnout		766		
Conservative gain from UKIP		Swing		

Cranmore By-Election 7 June 2018
Party	Candidate	Votes	%	±%
Conservative	Lance Kennedy	479	45.1	−1.5
Liberal Democrats	Les Cruwys	346	32.5	+32.5
Labour	Steve Bush	238	22.4	−0.1
Majority		133	12.5	
Turnout		1,063		
Conservative hold		Swing		

=== 2019–2023 ===
Castle By-Election 6 May 2021
Party	Candidate	Votes	%	±%
Conservative	Elizabeth Slade	513	40.8	+14.4
Liberal Democrats	David Wulff	319	25.4	−7.6
Labour	Richard Cornley	213	16.9	−7.3
Independent	Jason Lejeune	213	16.9	+16.9
Majority		194	15.4	
Turnout		1,258		
Conservative gain from Liberal Democrats		Swing		

Taw By-Election 6 May 2021
Party	Candidate	Votes	%	±%
Conservative	Peter Heal	418	64.1	N/A
Liberal Democrats	Mark Wooding	234	35.9	N/A
Majority		184	28.2	
Turnout		652		
Conservative hold		Swing		

Westexe By-Election 6 May 2021
Party	Candidate	Votes	%	±%
Conservative	Stephen Pugh	567	37.4	+20.0
Labour	Samuel James	274	18.1	+3.9
Green	Rosie Wibberley	263	17.3	+0.6
Independent	Adrian Howell	179	11.8	+11.8
Independent	Claire Hole	126	8.3	+8.3
Independent	Stephen Bush	108	7.1	+7.1
Majority		293	19.3	
Turnout		1,517		
Conservative gain from Independent		Swing		

Upper Culm By-Election 17 June 2021
Party	Candidate	Votes	%	±%
Conservative	James Bartlett	361	44.5	+8.1
Liberal Democrats	Sean Ritchie	346	42.6	−7.2
Green	Adam Rich	74	9.1	+9.1
Labour	Fiona Hutton	31	3.8	−10.0
Majority		15	1.8	
Turnout		812		
Conservative hold		Swing		

Cullompton South By-Election 7 April 2022
Party	Candidate	Votes	%	±%
Liberal Democrats	James Buczkowski	318	47.9	+26.2
Conservative	Rosemary Berry	279	42.0	+9.2
Labour	Jason Chamberlain	67	10.1	+10.1
Majority		39	5.9	
Turnout		664		
Liberal Democrats gain from Independent		Swing		

=== 2023–2027 ===
Upper Yeo and Taw By-Election 7 March 2024
Party	Candidate	Votes	%	±%
Liberal Democrats	Alex White	405	52.2	
Conservative	Peter Heal	226	29.1	
Labour	Hayden Sharp	91	11.7	
Green	Mark Scotland	54	7.0	
Majority		179	23.1	
Turnout		776		
Liberal Democrats gain from Conservative		Swing		

Tiverton Westexe By-Election 20 June 2024
Party	Candidate	Votes	%	±%
Liberal Democrats	Adam Stirling	431	45.4	
Conservative	Paul Osman	248	26.1	
Independent	Jason Lejeune	182	19.2	
Green	Laura Buchanan	88	9.3	
Majority		183	19.3	
Turnout		949		
Liberal Democrats hold		Swing		

Clare and Shuttern By-Election 1 May 2025
Party	Candidate	Votes	%	±%
Liberal Democrats	Martyn Stratton	664	50.0	
Conservative	Toby William Gray	615	46.3	
Labour	Terry Edwards	48	3.6	
Majority		49	36.9	
Turnout		1,373	44.5	
Liberal Democrats hold				

Crediton Lawrence By-Election 26 June 2025
Party	Candidate	Votes	%	±%
Liberal Democrats	Tim Stanford	540	64.9	
Reform	Andy Hankins	226	27.2	
Labour	Terence Edwards	66	7.9	
Majority		314	37.7	
Turnout		832		
Liberal Democrats hold				

Bradninch By-Election 15 October 2026
Party	Candidate	Votes	%	±%
Liberal Democrats	Mary Ryan	476	72.6	
Reform	Liam O'Brien	91	13.9	
Conservative	Dirk McFarlane-Aitken	37	5.6	
Labour	Piers Kotting	31	4.7	
Green	Kirsty Mackenzie	21	3.2	
Majority		385	58.7	
Turnout		656		
Liberal Democrats hold				
