= 2011 Mid Devon District Council election =

Local election in Devon, UK

Results of the 2011 Mid Devon District Council election

Elections to Mid Devon District Council were held on 5 May 2011, alongside other local elections across the United Kingdom. All 42 seats on the council were up for election. Following the election the Conservative Party gained the council from no overall control.

== Results summary ==
2011 Mid Devon District Council election
| Party | Seats | Change |
|---|---|---|
| Conservative Party | 24 | ▲4 |
| Liberal Democrats | 6 | ▼2 |
| Others | 12 | ▼2 |

== Results by ward (A-Z) ==
=== Boniface (2) ===
Boniface
| Party | Candidate | Votes | % | ±% |
|---|---|---|---|---|
| Liberal Democrats | Nicholas Way * | 591 | 36.6 | −22.1 |
| Liberal Democrats | John Downes * | 465 | | |
| Conservative | Anne Hughes | 328 | 20.3 | −1.7 |
| Independent | Frank Letch | 299 | 18.5 | N/A |
| Conservative | Glyndwr Williams | 271 | | |
| Labour | Roland Barker | 219 | 13.6 | N/A |
| UKIP | Robert Edwards | 179 | 11.1 | −8.2 |
| Majority | | N/A | 16.3 | −20.4 |
| Turnout | | 2352 | N/A | N/A |
| Liberal Democrats hold | | Swing | N/A | |
| Liberal Democrats hold | | Swing | N/A | |

=== Bradninch (1) ===
Bradninch
| Party | Candidate | Votes | % | ±% |
|---|---|---|---|---|
| Conservative | Edgar Berry * | 472 | 50.5 | +0.4 |
| Liberal Democrats | Luke Taylor | 389 | 41.6 | −8.3 |
| UKIP | Lloyd Knight | 73 | 7.8 | N/A |
| Majority | | 83 | 8.9 | +8.7 |
| Turnout | | 934 | N/A | N/A |
| Conservative hold | | Swing | N/A | |

=== Cadbury (1) ===
Cadbury
| Party | Candidate | Votes | % | ±% |
|---|---|---|---|---|
| Conservative | Robert Deed * | 495 | 65.4 | +4.6 |
| Labour | Janet Wills | 152 | 20.1 | N/A |
| UKIP | Elizabeth Curzon-Howe | 110 | 14.5 | N/A |
| Majority | | 343 | 45.3 | +23.7 |
| Turnout | | 757 | N/A | N/A |
| Conservative hold | | Swing | N/A | |

=== Canonsleigh (2) ===
Canonsleigh
| Party | Candidate | Votes | % | ±% |
|---|---|---|---|---|
| Conservative | Heather Bainbridge * | Unopposed | N/A | N/A |
| Independent | Melvyn Lucas | Unopposed | N/A | N/A |
| Majority | | N/A | N/A | N/A |
| Turnout | | N/A | N/A | N/A |
| Conservative hold | | Swing | N/A | |
| Independent hold | | Swing | N/A | |

=== Castle (2) ===
Castle
| Party | Candidate | Votes | % | ±% |
|---|---|---|---|---|
| Conservative | Janet Rendle * | 624 | 46.6 | +11.1 |
| Conservative | Brenda Hull | 514 | | |
| Liberal Democrats | Elaine Trump | 290 | 21.7 | +6.2 |
| Labour | Anne Kilshaw | 287 | 21.4 | N/A |
| Liberal Democrats | John Harris | 265 | | |
| Labour | David Graham | 239 | | |
| Independent | Duncan Binks | 138 | 10.3 | N/A |
| Majority | | N/A | 24.9 | +22.0 |
| Turnout | | 2357 | N/A | N/A |
| Conservative gain from Independent | | Swing | N/A | |
| Conservative hold | | Swing | N/A | |

=== Clare & Shuttern (2) ===
Clare & Shuttern
| Party | Candidate | Votes | % | ±% |
|---|---|---|---|---|
| Conservative | Raymond Stanley * | 789 | 59.5 | +5.4 |
| Conservative | Nigel Burrough | 642 | | |
| Independent | Terence Knagg | 536 | 40.5 | +9.4 |
| Independent | Francis Stoner | 370 | | |
| Majority | | N/A | 19.0 | −4.0 |
| Turnout | | 2337 | N/A | N/A |
| Conservative hold | | Swing | N/A | |
| Conservative hold | | Swing | N/A | |

=== Cranmore (3) ===
Cranmore
| Party | Candidate | Votes | % | ±% |
|---|---|---|---|---|
| Conservative | Heather Griggs | 728 | 51.9 | +20.1 |
| Liberal Democrats | Paul Williams * | 675 | 48.1 | +7.6 |
| Liberal Democrats | Kevin Wilson * | 647 | | |
| Conservative | Anthony Hendy | 611 | | |
| Conservative | Felicity Colthorpe | 589 | | |
| Liberal Democrats | Mark Thompson | 575 | | |
| Majority | | N/A | 3.8 | −4.9 |
| Turnout | | 3825 | N/A | N/A |
| Conservative gain from Liberal Democrats | | Swing | N/A | |
| Liberal Democrats hold | | Swing | N/A | |
| Liberal Democrats hold | | Swing | N/A | |

=== Cullompton North (2) ===
Cullompton North
| Party | Candidate | Votes | % | ±% |
|---|---|---|---|---|
| Independent | Nicola Woollatt | 662 | 69.2 | N/A |
| Independent | Linda Holloway * | 646 | | |
| Conservative | Gillian Evans | 295 | 30.8 | N/A |
| Conservative | Patricia Jones | 238 | | |
| Majority | | N/A | 38.4 | +34.4 |
| Turnout | | 1841 | N/A | N/A |
| Independent hold | | Swing | N/A | |
| Independent hold | | Swing | N/A | |

=== Cullompton Outer (1) ===
Cullompton Outer
| Party | Candidate | Votes | % | ±% |
|---|---|---|---|---|
| Independent | David Puglsey | 396 | 52.9 | +16.1 |
| Independent | Queenie Broom * | 352 | 47.1 | +3.7 |
| Majority | | 44 | 5.8 | −0.6 |
| Turnout | | 748 | N/A | N/A |
| Independent gain from Independent | | Swing | N/A | |

=== Cullompton South (2) ===
Cullompton South
| Party | Candidate | Votes | % | ±% |
|---|---|---|---|---|
| Independent | Terry Snow * | 759 | 76.4 | +7.8 |
| Independent | Eileen Andrews * | 456 | | |
| Independent | James MacPherson | 415 | | |
| Liberal Democrats | Carol Verney | 234 | 23.6 | N/A |
| Majority | | N/A | 52.8 | +15.6 |
| Turnout | | 1864 | N/A | N/A |
| Independent hold | | Swing | N/A | |
| Independent hold | | Swing | N/A | |

== See also ==
- Mid Devon District Council elections
