= 2019 Mid Devon District Council election =

2019 UK local government election

- 2 May 2019

All 42 seats to Mid Devon District Council 22 seats needed for a majority

	First party	Second party
Party	Conservative	Liberal Democrats
Last election	28 seats, 48.8%	5 seats, 10.9%
Seats won	18	12
Seat change	▼10	▲7
Popular vote	7,921	6,887
Percentage	34.1%	29.6%
Swing	▼14.7%	▲18.7%
	Third party	Fourth party
Party	Independent	Green
Last election	6 seats, 17.5%	0 seats, 5.9%
Seats won	10	2
Seat change	▲4	▲2
Popular vote	3,229	2,003
Percentage	13.9%	8.6%
Swing	▼3.6%	▲2.7%
- Results of the 2019 Mid Devon District Council election
Council control before election
Conservative
Council control after election
No overall control

The 2019 Mid Devon District Council election took place on 2 May 2019 to elect members of the Mid Devon District Council in England.

It was held on the same day as other local elections. At the elections the Conservatives lost control of the council, with no party winning an overall majority.

== Summary ==
=== Election result ===
2019 Mid Devon District Council election
Party	Candidates	Seats	Gains	Losses	Net gain/loss	Seats %	Votes %	Votes	+/−
Conservative	42	18	1	11	▼10	42.9	34.1	7,921	–14.7
Liberal Democrats	33	12	7	0	▲7	28.6	29.6	6,887	+18.7
Independent	14	10	6	2	▲4	23.8	13.9	3,229	–3.6
Green	9	2	2	0	▲2	4.8	8.6	2,003	+2.7
Labour	14	0	0	0	Steady	0.0	7.1	1,651	–3.2
UKIP	7	0	0	2	▼2	0.0	5.8	1,338	+0.1
Liberal	2	0	0	1	▼1	0.0	0.9	210	±0.0

== Ward results ==
=== Boniface ===
Boniface
Party	Candidate	Votes	%	±%
Liberal Democrats	Jim Cairney	541	57.9	+9.9
Liberal Democrats	John Downes	534	57.1	+18.0
UKIP	Bob Edwards	161	17.2	−2.8
Conservative	Gina Ford	159	17.0	−6.2
Conservative	Roddy Jaques	154	16.5	−8.3
Labour	Louise Lampard	115	12.3	N/A
Rejected ballots		3	0.32	
Turnout		938	32	
Registered electors		2,964		
Liberal Democrats hold		Swing		
Liberal Democrats hold		Swing		

=== Bradninch ===
Bradninch
Party	Candidate	Votes	%	±%
Liberal Democrats	Luke Taylor	696	90.7	+30.0
Conservative	Paul Trimming	71	9.3	−30.0
Rejected ballots		5	0.65	
Turnout		772	50	
Registered electors		1,536		
Liberal Democrats hold		Swing		

=== Cadbury ===
Cadbury
Party	Candidate	Votes	%	±%
Independent	Bob Deed	398	61.1	+23.2
Conservative	Gavin Donovan	253	38.9	+5.6
Rejected ballots		21	3.12	
Turnout		672	51	
Registered electors		1,326		
Independent hold		Swing		

=== Canonsleigh ===
Canonsleigh
Party	Candidate	Votes	%	±%
Conservative	Christine Collis	412	47.2	−8.4
Green	Jo Norton	348	39.9	+2.9
Conservative	Martin Trevor	301	34.5	−16.1
Liberal Democrats	Vera Hale	227	26.0	N/A
Labour	Mary Chesney	225	25.8	N/A
Rejected ballots		14	1.58	
Turnout		887	34	
Registered electors		2,616		
Conservative hold		Swing		
Green gain from Conservative		Swing		

=== Castle ===
Castle
Party	Candidate	Votes	%	±%
Liberal Democrats	Irene Hill	371	36.1	N/A
Liberal Democrats	Ben Holdman	329	32.0	+4.1
Conservative	Brenda Hull	297	28.9	−12.7
Conservative	Elizabeth Slade	284	27.6	−13.4
Labour	Anne Kilshaw	272	26.4	−3.3
UKIP	Mike Turner	185	18.0	N/A
Rejected ballots		6	0.58	
Turnout		1,035	31	
Registered electors		3,323		
Liberal Democrats gain from Conservative		Swing		
Liberal Democrats gain from Conservative		Swing		

=== Clare & Shuttern ===
Clare & Shuttern
Party	Candidate	Votes	%	±%
Conservative	Ray Stanley	549	46.5	−8.0
Conservative	Andrew Moore	464	39.3	−14.7
Liberal Democrats	Chris Adcock	410	34.7	N/A
Independent	Peter Wood	346	29.3	−13.4
Liberal Democrats	Simon Browne-Wilkinson	303	25.7	N/A
Rejected ballots		17	1.42	
Turnout		1,198	42	
Registered electors		2,874		
Conservative hold		Swing		
Conservative hold		Swing		

=== Cranmore ===
Cranmore
Party	Candidate	Votes	%	±%
Conservative	Sue Griggs	505	43.5	−2.3
Liberal Democrats	Les Cruwys	494	42.6	+12.2
Conservative	Christina Daw	461	39.7	+4.5
Conservative	Lance Kennedy	416	35.9	+4.1
Liberal Democrats	Philip Hill	347	29.9	N/A
Liberal Democrats	Bruce Milton	307	26.5	N/A
Labour	Stephen Bush	265	22.8	+2.8
Labour	Lynne Dean	206	17.8	−4.4
Labour	Ana Hendy	190	16.4	−4.5
Rejected ballots		20	1.69	
Turnout		1,180	30	
Registered electors		3,938		
Conservative hold		Swing		
Liberal Democrats gain from Conservative		Swing		
Conservative hold		Swing		

=== Cullompton North ===
Cullompton North
Party	Candidate	Votes	%	±%
Independent	Nikki Woollatt	486	55.4	+2.1
Independent	Ashley Wilce	343	39.1	N/A
Conservative	Iain Emmett	268	30.6	−24.5
Conservative	Martin Smith	216	24.6	−11.5
Liberal Democrats	Karen Hope	160	18.2	N/A
Liberal Democrats	Steve Hayman	113	12.9	N/A
Independent	Robert Dietrich	57	6.5	N/A
Rejected ballots		5	0.57	
Turnout		882	27	
Registered electors		3,229		
Independent hold		Swing		
Independent gain from Conservative		Swing		

=== Cullompton Outer ===
Cullompton Outer
Party	Candidate	Votes	%	±%
Independent	David Pugsley	303	40.0	−7.5
Conservative	Rosemary Berry	278	36.7	−15.8
Liberal Democrats	Cathy Connor	177	23.4	N/A
Rejected ballots		4	0.52	
Turnout		762	41	
Registered electors		1,857		
Independent gain from Conservative		Swing		

=== Cullompton South ===
Cullompton South
Party	Candidate	Votes	%	±%
Conservative	John Berry	339	40.0	+9.2
Independent	Eileen Andrews	310	36.6	−5.5
Conservative	Will Jones	256	30.2	+1.0
Liberal Democrats	Mary Ryan	225	26.5	N/A
Liberal Democrats	John Timperley	195	23.0	N/A
Liberal	Lloyd Knight	161	19.0	N/A
Rejected ballots		11	1.28	
Turnout		859	25	
Registered electors		3,433		
Conservative gain from Independent		Swing		
Independent hold		Swing		

=== Halberton ===
Halberton
Party	Candidate	Votes	%	±%
Conservative	Ray Radford	305	51.6	−17.9
Green	Gillian Westcott	117	19.8	−10.7
Liberal Democrats	Iain Campbell	88	14.9	N/A
Labour	Septimus Waugh	81	13.7	N/A
Rejected ballots		6	1.01	
Turnout		597	38	
Registered electors		1,577		
Conservative hold		Swing		

=== Lawrence ===
Lawrence
Party	Candidate	Votes	%	±%
Liberal Democrats	Frank Letch	682	62.3	+20.9
Liberal Democrats	Andi Wyer	570	52.1	+15.1
Conservative	Judi Binks	256	23.4	−7.4
UKIP	Mike Szabo	233	21.3	+12.8
Conservative	Dan Webb	223	20.4	−5.9
Rejected ballots		10	0.91	
Turnout		1,104	38	
Registered electors		2,920		
Liberal Democrats hold		Swing		
Liberal Democrats hold		Swing		

=== Lower Culm ===
Lower Culm
Party	Candidate	Votes	%	±%
Conservative	Richard Chesterton	524	36.3	+36.3
Independent	Barry Warren	478	33.1	N/A
Conservative	Bob Evans	424	29.4	+29.4
Liberal Democrats	Andrea Glover	408	28.3	N/A
Conservative	George Birch	354	24.5	+24.5
UKIP	Margaret Dennis	328	22.7	N/A
Liberal Democrats	John Poynton	323	22.4	N/A
Liberal Democrats	Richard Foord	312	21.6	N/A
Labour	Edward Southerden	190	13.2	N/A
Independent	Roger Norton	95	6.6	N/A
Rejected ballots		11	0.76	
Turnout		1,453	31	
Registered electors		4,634		
Conservative hold		Swing		
Independent gain from Conservative		Swing		
Conservative hold		Swing		

=== Lowman ===
Lowman
Party	Candidate	Votes	%	±%
Independent	Dennis Knowles	437	36.8	+0.6
Conservative	Neal Davey	380	32.0	−14.7
Conservative	Colin Slade	374	31.5	−4.3
Green	Timothy Gorringe	308	25.9	+3.2
Liberal Democrats	Stephanie Rakobane	283	23.8	N/A
Liberal Democrats	David Garcia	273	23.0	N/A
Labour	Andy Perris	259	21.8	−1.1
Conservative	James Ruttledge	248	20.9	−9.5
UKIP	Richard Wright	219	18.4	N/A
Rejected ballots		5	0.42	
Turnout		1,194	25	
Registered electors		4,806		
Independent hold		Swing		
Conservative hold		Swing		
Conservative hold		Swing		

=== Newbrooke ===
Newbrooke
Party	Candidate	Votes	%	±%
Liberal Democrats	Graeme Barnell	274	49.1	N/A
Conservative	Martin Binks	223	40.0	−13.1
UKIP	Allan Jones	61	10.9	N/A
Rejected ballots		2	0.36	
Turnout		560	44	
Registered electors		1,272		
Liberal Democrats gain from Conservative		Swing		

=== Sandford & Creedy ===
Sandford & Creedy
Party	Candidate	Votes	%	±%
Conservative	Margaret Squires	632	55.7	+3.6
Green	Elizabeth Wainwright	565	49.8	+23.4
Conservative	Peter Heal	482	42.5	−5.6
Rejected ballots		22	1.9	
Turnout		1,157	43	
Registered electors		2,714		
Conservative hold		Swing		
Green gain from Conservative		Swing		

=== Silverton ===
Silverton
Party	Candidate	Votes	%	±%
Liberal Democrats	Josh Wright	277	41.8	N/A
Conservative	Deborah Custance Baker	197	29.8	−3.9
Independent	Patricia Jones	139	21.0	N/A
Liberal	Janet Rice	49	7.4	−41.1
Rejected ballots		12	1.78	
Turnout		674	44	
Registered electors		1,545		
Liberal Democrats gain from Liberal		Swing		

=== Taw ===
Taw
Party	Candidate	Votes	%	±%
Conservative	John Daw	Unopposed	N/A	−62.7
Turnout		N/A	N/A	
Conservative hold		Swing		

=== Taw Vale ===
Taw Vale
Party	Candidate	Votes	%	±%
Conservative	Clive Eginton	388	63.5	−0.4
Green	Penny King	140	22.9	+9.2
Labour	Connor Bowdler	83	13.6	N/A
Rejected ballots		9	1.45	
Turnout		620	45	
Registered electors		1,380		
Conservative hold		Swing		

=== Upper Culm ===
Upper Culm
Party	Candidate	Votes	%	±%
Liberal Democrats	Simon Clist	666	53.2	N/A
Conservative	Glanmor Hughes	486	38.8	−19.4
Liberal Democrats	Sean Ritchie	464	37.1	N/A
Conservative	Henry Carew	452	36.1	N/A
Labour	Terry Edwards	185	14.8	N/A
Rejected ballots		28	2.19	
Turnout		1,279	39	
Registered electors		3,289		
Liberal Democrats gain from Independent		Swing		
Conservative hold		Swing		

=== Upper Yeo ===
Upper Yeo
Party	Candidate	Votes	%	±%
Liberal Democrats	Alex White	295	56.5	N/A
Conservative	Jill Doe	227	43.5	+43.5
Rejected ballots		7	1.32	
Turnout		529	38	
Registered electors		1,400		
Liberal Democrats gain from Conservative		Swing		

=== Way ===
Way
Party	Candidate	Votes	%	±%
Conservative	Polly Colthorpe	302	57.9	−17.6
Green	Dave Wood	225	42.1	N/A
Rejected ballots		8	1.5	
Turnout		535	42	
Registered electors		1,283		
Conservative hold		Swing		

=== Westexe ===
Westexe
Party	Candidate	Votes	%	±%
Independent	Ron Dolley	542	43.1	+3.1
Independent	Wally Burke	332	26.4	N/A
Independent	Gerald Luxton	332	26.4	−0.2
Conservative	Steve Flaws	281	22.3	−20.2
Conservative	Anthony Bush	270	21.4	N/A
Green	Rosie Wibberley	270	21.4	+4.8
Conservative	Claudette Harrower	245	19.5	N/A
Labour	Alison Mitchell	229	18.2	+1.4
Labour	Tim Bridger	227	18.0	+1.0
Labour	Tony Wheeler	172	13.7	−2.6
UKIP	Tony McIntyre	151	12.0	−15.1
Liberal Democrats	Sheila Whitlock	139	11.0	N/A
Liberal Democrats	David Whiteway	107	8.5	N/A
Rejected ballots		14	1.1	
Turnout		1,273	30	
Registered electors		4,267		
Independent gain from Conservative		Swing		
Independent gain from UKIP		Swing		
Independent gain from UKIP		Swing		

=== Yeo ===
Yeo
Party	Candidate	Votes	%	±%
Conservative	Derek Coren	589	54.2	−7.2
Conservative	Stuart Penny	514	47.3	+0.7
Liberal Democrats	John Hyson	474	43.6	+18.2
Liberal Democrats	Stephen Barnes	471	43.3	+23.2
Rejected ballots		20	1.81	
Turnout		1,107	40	
Registered electors		2,783		
Conservative hold		Swing		
Conservative hold		Swing		

== Changes 2019–2023 ==
- Graeme Barnell, elected for Newbrooke as a Liberal Democrat, left the party in March 2022 to join the council's non-aligned group.
- Bob Evans, elected for Lower Culm as a Conservative, was replaced as leader of the Conservative group and sacked as deputy leader of the council following the Cullompton South by-election in April 2022, after which he resigned from the Conservative group to sit as an ungrouped member.
- Andrew Moore, elected for Clare & Shuttern as a Conservative, left the Conservative group on 4 October 2022 to sit as a "wholly unaligned independent member".
- Chris Daw, elected for Cranmore as a Conservative, subsequently left the party to sit as a member of the council's non-aligned group.

=== By-elections ===
==== Castle ====
Castle by-election: 6 May 2021
Party	Candidate	Votes	%	±%
Conservative	Elizabeth Slade	513	40.8	+13.2
Liberal Democrats	David Wulff	319	25.4	−10.7
Labour	Richard Cornley	213	16.9	−9.5
Independent	Jason LeJeune	213	16.9	N/A
Rejected ballots		19	1.49	
Turnout		1,279	37.47	+6
Registered electors		3,413		
Conservative gain from Liberal Democrats		Swing		

The by-election was triggered by the resignation of the sitting Liberal Democrat councillor, Irene Hill.

==== Taw ====
Taw by-election: 6 May 2021
Party	Candidate	Votes	%	±%
Conservative	Peter Heal	418	64.1	+64.1
Liberal Democrats	Mark Wooding	234	35.9	N/A
Rejected ballots		10	1.51	
Turnout		662	47.59	+47.59
Registered electors		1,391		
Conservative hold		Swing		

The by-election was triggered by the death of the sitting Conservative councillor, John Daw, on 9 January 2020.

==== Westexe ====
Westexe by-election: 6 May 2021
Party	Candidate	Votes	%	±%
Conservative	Stephen Pugh	567	37.4	+15.1
Labour	Samuel James	274	18.1	−0.1
Green	Rosemary Wibberley	263	17.3	−4.1
Independent	Adrian Howell	179	11.8	N/A
Independent	Claire Hole	126	8.3	N/A
Independent	Stephen Bush	108	7.1	N/A
Rejected ballots		18	1.17	
Turnout		1,534	34.27	+4
Registered electors		4,476		
Conservative gain from Independent		Swing		

The by-election was triggered by the death of the sitting Independent councillor, Gerald Luxton.

==== Upper Culm ====
Upper Culm by-election: 17 June 2021
Party	Candidate	Votes	%	±%
Conservative	James Bartlett	361	44.5	+5.7
Liberal Democrats	Sean Ritchie	346	42.6	+5.5
Green	Adam Rich	74	9.1	N/A
Labour	Fiona Hutton	31	3.8	−11.0
Rejected ballots		2	0.25	
Turnout		814	23.94	−15
Registered electors		3,400		
Conservative hold		Swing		

The by-election was triggered by the death of the sitting Conservative councillor, Glanmor Hughes, on 10 April 2021.

==== Cullompton South ====
Cullompton South by-election: 7 April 2022
Party	Candidate	Votes	%	±%
Liberal Democrats	James Buczkowski	318	47.9	+21.4
Conservative	Annie Berry	279	42.0	+11.8
Labour	Jason Chamberlain	67	10.1	N/A
Majority		39	5.9	
Rejected ballots		4	0.6	
Turnout		668	20.7	
Registered electors		3,230		
Liberal Democrats gain from Independent		Swing		

The by-election was triggered by the resignation of the sitting Independent councillor, Eileen Andrews, aged 94, due to ill health.
