= 2019 United Kingdom local elections =

Elections to local councils and mayoralties

- 2 May 2019

248 of 395 councils in England All 11 Northern Irish councils 6 directly elected mayors
- Turnout: 32.8%
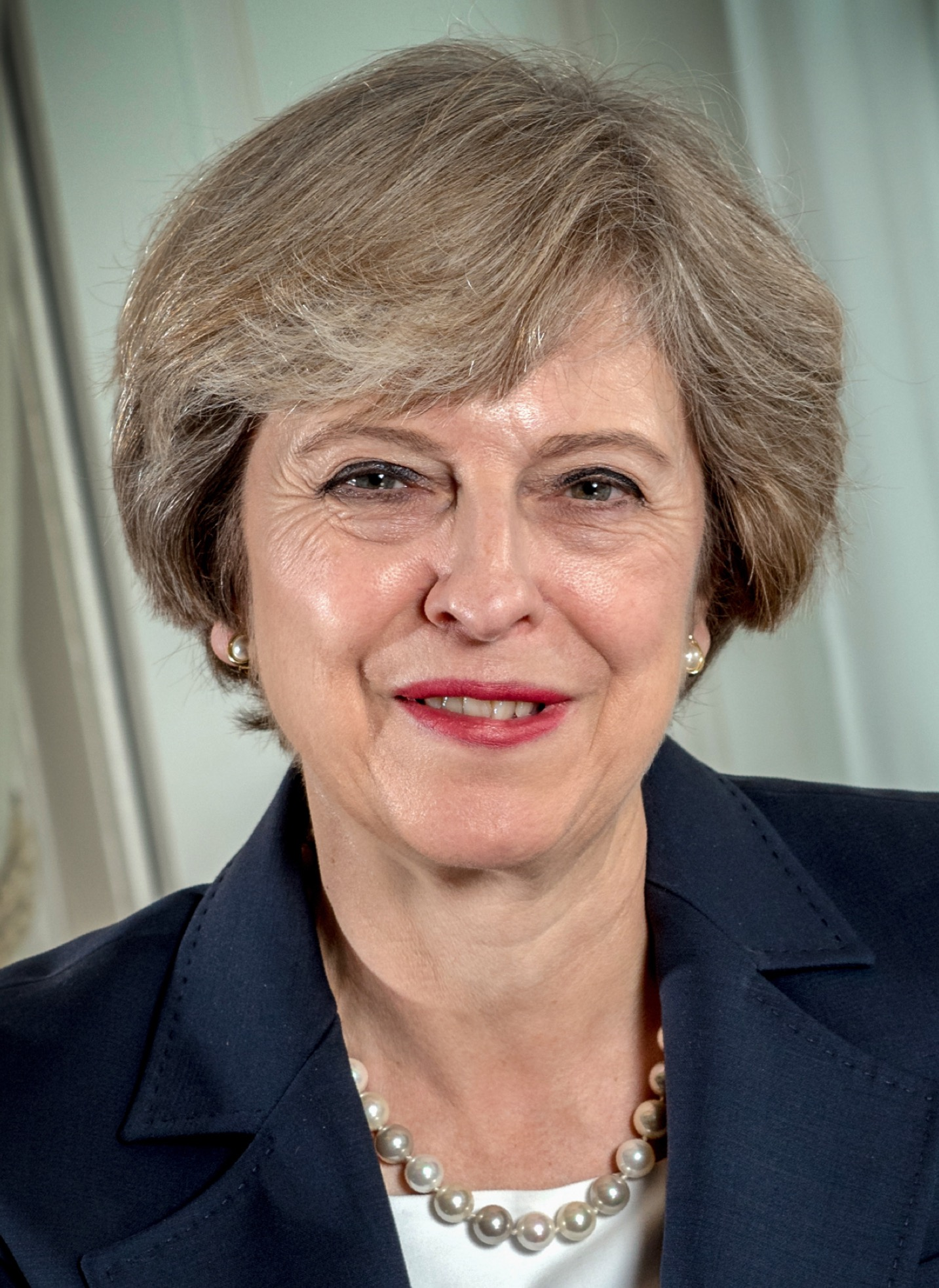

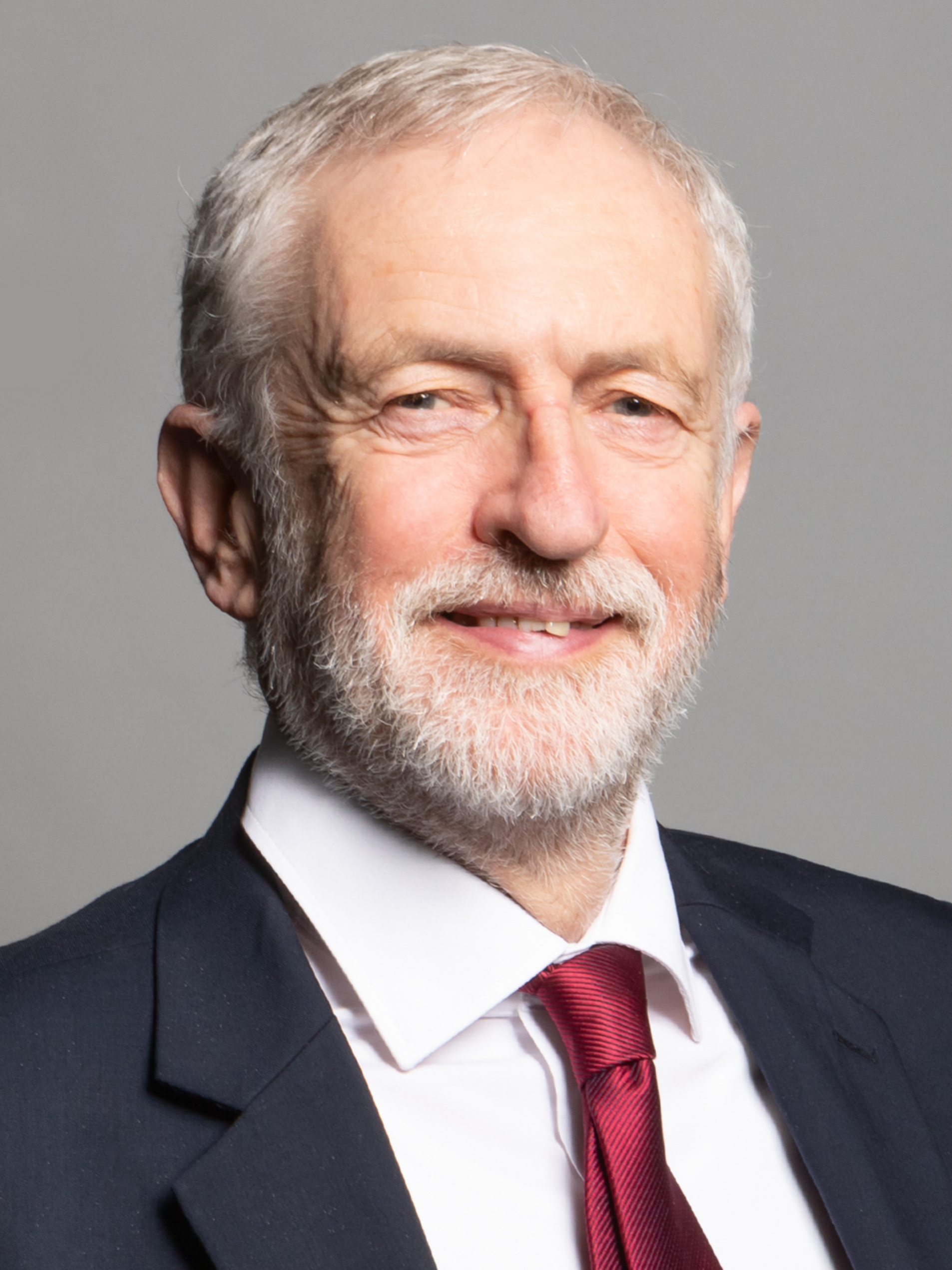

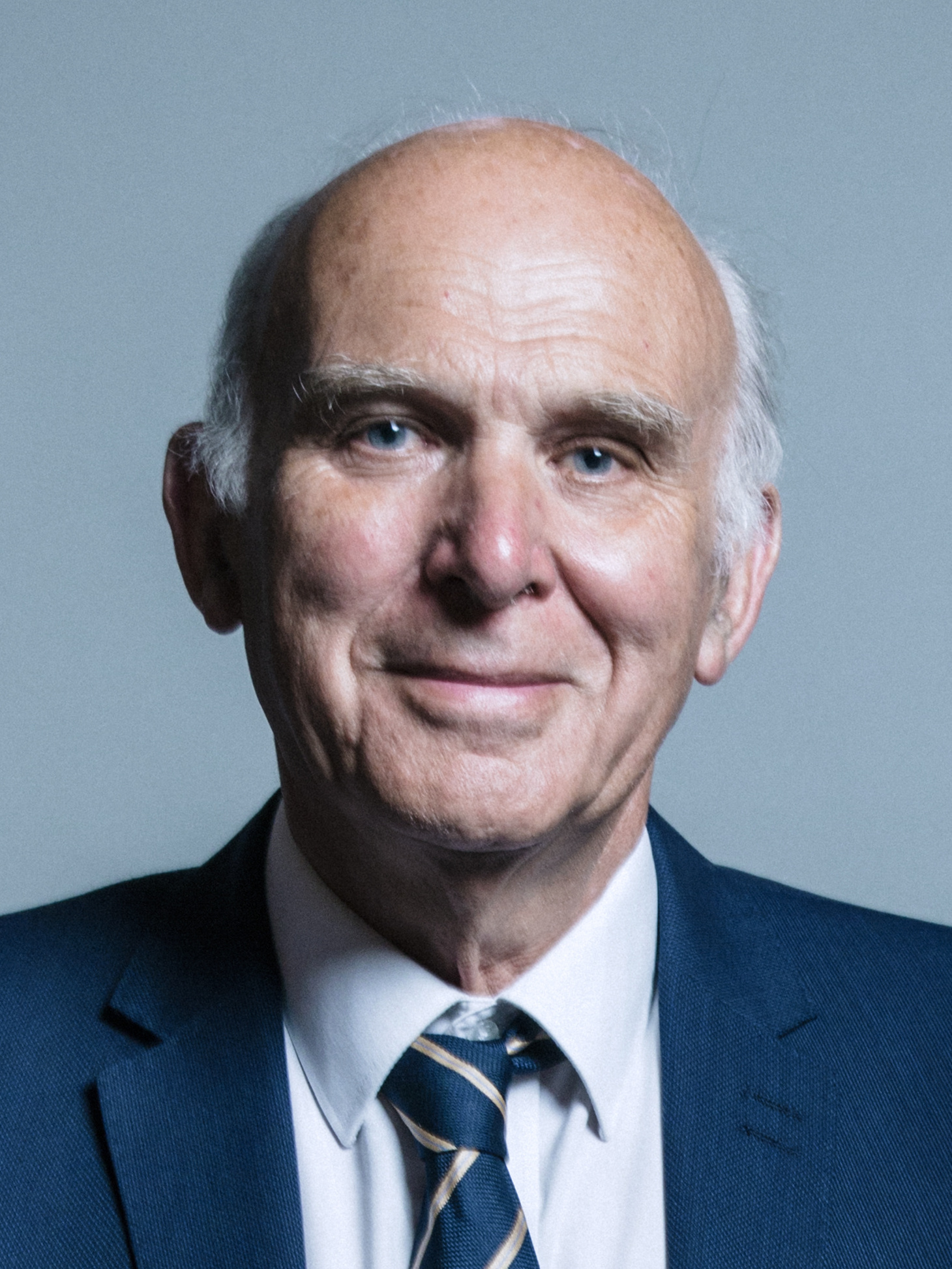

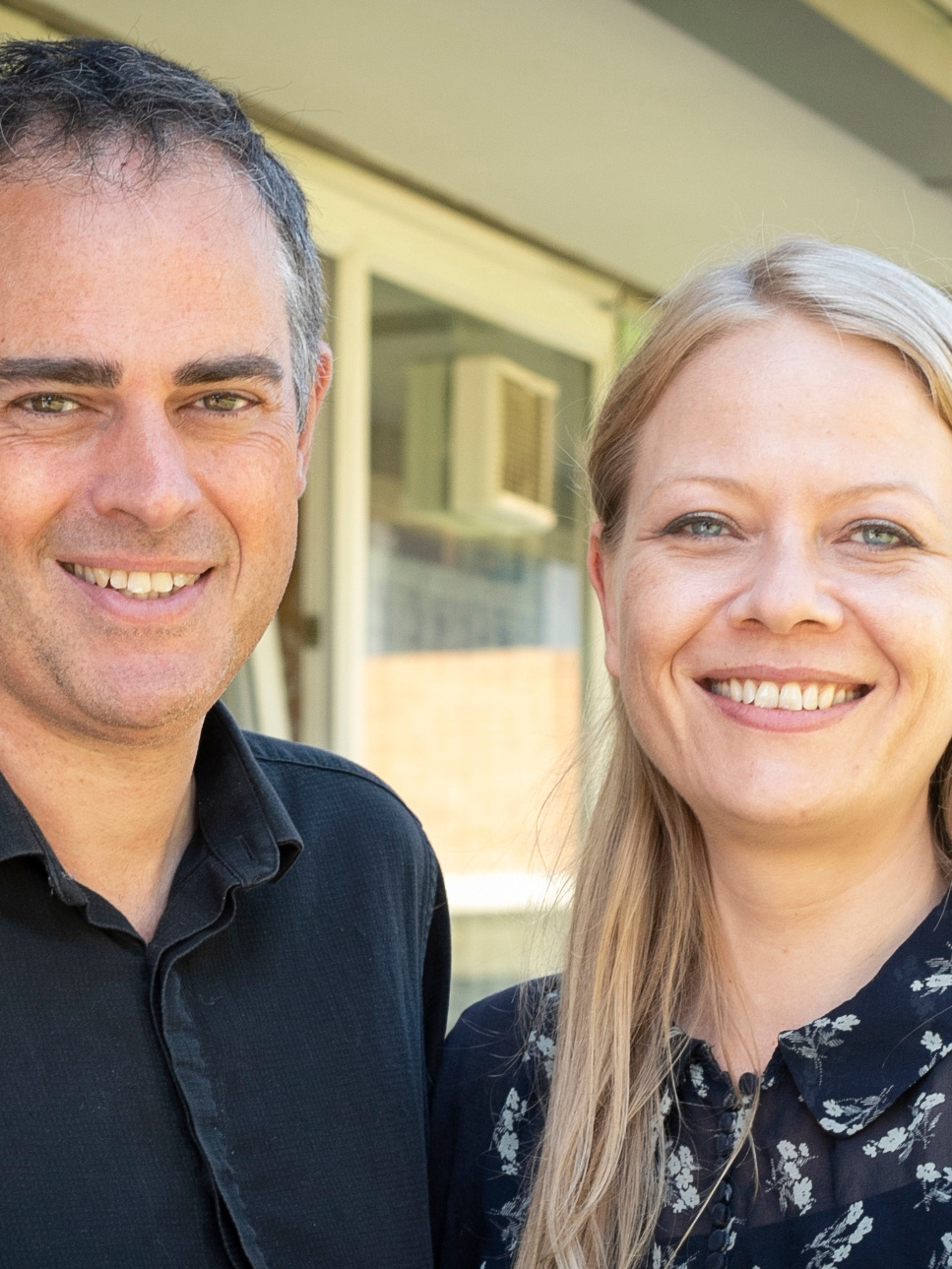
	First party	Second party
Leader	Theresa May	Jeremy Corbyn
Party	Conservative	Labour
Leader since	11 July 2016	12 September 2015
Seats before	9,112 seats 188 councils	6,499 seats 104 councils
Projected vote share (Note: All vote shares in the infobox are projected national vote shares calculated by the BBC.)	28% ▼7%	28% ▼7%
Seats won (2019)	3,564; 93 councils	2,021; 60 councils
Councillors (after)	7,533; 144 councils	6,366; 98 councils
Net change (notional)	▼1,330 ▼44 councils	▼84 ▼6 councils
	Third party	Fourth party
Leader	Vince Cable	Jonathan Bartley & Siân Berry
Party	Liberal Democrats	Green
Leader since	20 July 2017	2 September 2016 / 4 September 2018
Seats before	1,899 seats 13 councils	198 seats 0 councils
Projected vote share	19% ▲3%	n/a
Seats won (2019)	1,351; 18 councils	265; 0 councils
Councillors (after)	2,535; 23 councils	377; 0 councils
Net change (notional)	▲704 ▲10 councils	▲194; 0 councils

The 2019 United Kingdom local elections took place on Thursday 2 May 2019, with 248 English local councils, six directly elected mayors in England, and all 11 local councils in Northern Ireland being contested.

A total of 8,886 councillors were elected: terms were up for 8,861 seats, but eight elections for a total of 14 seats were postponed due to the death of a candidate; there were also casual vacancies to be filled: 38 in England (including on nine councils with no other elections) and one on Dundee City Council in Scotland.

With the exception of areas whose electoral cycle has temporarily changed (due to a boundary review) or permanently changed, or that have been reorganised, the seats up for election in England were last contested in the 2015 local elections, on the same day as the general election of that year. The seats in Northern Ireland were last regularly contested in 2014.

The biggest winners were the Liberal Democrats, who gained 704 seats to make a total of 1,351 councillors. The biggest losers were the Conservative Party down 1,333 from their previous total to 3,561 seats. Labour also lost seats, down by 84 to 2,021 seats. The Green Party gained 194 seats for a total of 265 seats. UKIP lost 145 seats, having only 31 councillors elected.

== Voters ==
All registered electors (British, Irish, Commonwealth and European Union citizens) who were aged 18 or over on the day of the election were entitled to vote in the local elections.

A person with two homes (such as a university student having a term-time address and living at home during holidays) could register to vote at both addresses as long as the addresses are not in the same electoral area, and can vote in the local elections for the two different local councils.

Ten local authorities in England required voters to provide identification as part of trial schemes.

== Background ==
A majority of the councils up for election in this year were last elected in 2015, the same day as the general election. The result of the 2018 local elections saw the collapse of the UK Independence Party's vote, largely to the benefit of the Conservatives. The Liberal Democrats made gains in 2018; David Cutts, a professor of political science at the University of Birmingham, argued that the 2019 elections would be more a test of their relevance as the elections were in old strongholds of theirs.

In the run-up to the elections, Facebook announced that they would only allow political adverts from authenticated accounts. The government also funded a grant scheme for disabled candidates to participate, funding 60 candidates.

Brexit dominated UK politics leading up to the local elections. In March, there was a demonstration in London, the Put it to the People March, in favour of a second referendum on EU membership, with an attendance reported to be between several hundred thousand and over one million. In addition, an online petition calling for revocation of the UK's withdrawal notification under Article 50 TEU reached over 6 million signatures, becoming the fastest signed petition ever in the UK. On 29 March thousands of pro-Brexit marchers demonstrated in Parliament Square in London. Though the UK was set to leave the European Union on 29 March, this was initially delayed till 12 April, then was further delayed to 31 October. Because of this longer extension, the UK participated within elections to the European Parliament in order to avoid a no-deal scenario on 1 June.

In April, protests in London around Parliament Square and Westminster organised by the environmental pressure group Extinction Rebellion took place, in which activist blocked roads, bridges and glued themselves to public buildings. A total of 1,130 people were arrested during the demonstrations.

Vince Cable, leader of the Liberal Democrats, announced on 14 March that he would be stepping down from that role, with a new leadership election to be held after the May local elections. There has been pressure within the Conservative party on prime minister Theresa May to resign following the local elections, triggering a new leadership election.

=== Campaigning ===
The Conservatives stood candidates in 96% of the available seats, Labour contested 77%, the Liberal Democrats 53%, the Green Party of England and Wales 30% and UKIP 16%.

8,530 / 8,886 (96%)
6,842 / 8,886 (77%)
4,710 / 8,886 (53%)
2,666 / 8,886 (30%)
1,422 / 8,886 (16%)

— Seats contested by party, Politics Home

According to the Electoral Reform Society, there were 148 councillors who were elected unopposed, largely Conservatives. New parties the Brexit Party and Change UK, although both standing in European elections later in the month, did not stand in the local elections. Chuka Umunna, Change UK's spokesperson, recommended voters support anti-Brexit parties like the Liberal Democrats or Greens. Leave.EU encouraged people to spoil their ballot paper in protest at delays in Brexit.

Nationally, Labour organised their campaign on raising awareness of the impact of the austerity programme by the Conservative-led government on local councils, which led subsequently to higher council tax and reduced local services. As an effect of cuts to council budgets, council spending per person has fallen 30% since 2010. The shadow chancellor, John McDonnell, commented that the economic policies of Preston City Council, where Labour took control of the council in 2011, were a model that he wanted other Labour councils to follow. Their changes saw the public procurement budget rise significantly, unemployment decrease and quality of life improve. Labour sought to avoid talking about Brexit, but internal rows over their Brexit policy continued to create headlines.

Similarly, the Conservatives focused their campaign away from Brexit and instead on efficient local services, low council tax and green credentials. This detraction from Brexit, however, was quite difficult. Internal party sources voiced a negative outlook on the success of these elections, with the deputy chair of the party saying it was an opportunity for voters to protest against the party's handling of the Brexit negotiations. ConservativeHome interviewed ten Conservative councillors about how the campaigning had gone across the country and found a negative attitude. Defence secretary Gavin Williamson was sacked the day before the elections, which was predicted to be unhelpful for the Conservative campaign.

There were isolated incidents of politically motivated violence during the election campaign. There were a few cases of councillors, from the Labour and Conservative parties, being assaulted whilst campaigning. A currently unknown assailant fired shots at the home of a Labour councillor in Sheffield. Homes with Labour, Liberal Democrat and Green signs were damaged in Lewes, and a Liberal Democrat candidate's car was attacked and painted with swastikas in Faversham.

== Results ==
=== Great Britain ===
Party	Councillors			Councils		
Party	Won	After	+/- (Note: Because the number of council seats shifts every year due to boundary changes and local government reorganisation, changes are notional changes calculated by the BBC.)	Won	After	+/-
Conservative	3,564	7,533	▼1,330	93	144	▼44
Labour	2,021	6,366	▼84	60	98	▼6
Liberal Democrats	1,351	2,535	▲704	18	23	▲10
SNP	—N/a (Note: There were no elections in Scotland in 2019.)	432	Steady	0	0	Steady
Green	265	377	▲194	0	0	Steady
Plaid Cymru	—N/a (Note: There were no elections in Wales in 2019.)	204	Steady	0	1	Steady
UKIP	31	62	▼148	0	0	Steady
Independent	1,179	2,123	▲662	4	11	▲3
No overall control	—N/a			73	118	▲37

Final results:

The Conservatives lost control of 44 councils and more than 1,300 council seats. It was the worst Conservative local election performance since 1995, when the party lost more than 2,000 seats. Labour, despite topping national polls, lost 6 councils and more than 80 seats.

Parties supporting remaining in the EU performed well. The Liberal Democrats made the most gains of any party, while the Greens also picked up seats with the largest percentage growth. This election was the largest rise in Green council seat gains in 20 years. There was also a significant increase in the number of independent and local party councillors, with their number of seats more than doubling. Similarly, in Northern Ireland, Alliance (the Lib Dems' sister party), some smaller parties and independents also made significant gains.

The elections were marked by a number of spoiled ballots expressing anger toward the Brexit stances of the Conservative and Labour parties. In the voter ID trial areas an average of 102 voters in each pilot area failed to vote due to not having the required documentation, compared with 70 per pilot area in 2018.

The turnout for the elections was 32.5%.

=== Analysis ===
Leading up to the election, journalists had noted the Conservatives' had performed well when these council seats had last been elected in the 2015 local elections due to those elections coinciding with the 2015 general election, where the party made gains. Defending those gains was predicted to be difficult, and when combined with Theresa May's struggle to deliver on Brexit, various sources predicted a loss of between 500 and 1000 seats for the Conservatives. Conservative peer Lord Robert Hayward projected that his party would lose at least 800 seats, with 500 to go to the Liberal Democrats and 300 to Labour.

The BBC and other analysts calculated projected national vote shares from these local election results. These projections aim to assess what the council results indicate the UK-wide vote would be if the results were repeated at a general election. The BBC's estimate put Labour and the Conservatives on 28% (both down 7% from the local elections the previous year), the Liberal Democrats on 18% (up 2%) and all other parties combined on 25%.

Sir John Curtice, who calculated the BBC's national projected vote share, commented that the rise of smaller parties and in particular the independents showed a dissatisfaction with the party system presently. Additionally, Curtice noted how the Green Party benefited from recent climate protests across the country.

Some argued that the Conservatives had set their expectations so low so that the perceived significance of their losses was reduced. Media reports described the results as poor for both Labour and the Conservatives, with many noting decline of Labour representation in some leave areas. It was also regarded as a disappointing result for Labour because of expectations that they would make gains.

Will Jennings, a professor at the University of Southampton analysed ward-level data and found little correlation between Labour's decline and the level of Brexit support in a ward. Labour made both gains and loses in areas that both voted to leave and remain in the 2016 referendum. Jennings instead noted the results better fit the transition in British politics at that time; where large cities, areas with high student populations, and professionals were moving towards Labour, whilst deindustrialised towns were moving towards the Conservatives.

Simon Briscoe, statistician and director of The Data Analysis Bureau, was critical of the idea that the Liberal Democrats had experienced a surge on the scale that commentators described. He instead attributed their gains to a much lower turnout when compared to the 2015 local elections. An example of this is that any swings in vote share towards the Liberal Democrats masked the fact that the number of votes for them hadn't changed significantly from 2015.

Martin Baxter, the creator of the political analytics website Electoral Calculus, suggested that the election data indicated that the next general election could produce a Labour-Scottish Nationalist coalition government.

== England ==
In England, council elections were held in 33 metropolitan boroughs, 168 of the second-tier districts, and 47 of the unitary authorities, as well as for six directly elected mayoral posts. 248 of the 343 English local councils held elections, with the exception of eight unitary authorities, the Isles of Scilly, the 26 counties, 24 non-metropolitan districts and boroughs, three metropolitan boroughs, the 32 London boroughs and the City of London. 8,399 seats were up for election (but elections are postponed for 14), with a further 38 casual vacancies to be filled, so 8,423 councillors were elected. Elections also took place for most English parish councils.

By-elections were held for seven county council seats (in Cambridgeshire, Cumbria, Gloucestershire, Kent (two seats), Surrey and West Sussex) and for two seats in the London Borough of Lewisham. Other casual vacancies to be filled (variously by by-election or multiple vacancy election) are indicated in the tables below by a superscript addition (^{+n}).

=== Metropolitan boroughs ===
In 33 of the 36 English metropolitan borough councils, one-third of their seats were up for election. Elections were not held in Birmingham, Doncaster or Rotherham.

Council	Seats		Previous control	Result
Council	up	of	Previous control	Result
Barnsley	21	63	Labour	Labour
Bolton	20	60	Labour	No overall control (Conservative minority with Lib Dem/UKIP/Independent support)
Bradford	30	90	Labour	Labour
Bury	17	51	Labour	Labour
Calderdale	17	51	No overall control (Labour minority with Lib Dem support)	Labour
Coventry	18	54	Labour	Labour
Dudley	24	72	No overall control (Labour minority with Independent support)	No overall control (Conservative minority)
Gateshead	22	66	Labour	Labour
Kirklees	23	69	Labour	Labour
Knowsley	15	45	Labour	Labour
Leeds	33	99	Labour	Labour
Liverpool	30	90	Labour	Labour
Manchester	32^{+1}	96	Labour	Labour
Newcastle upon Tyne	26^{+1}	78	Labour	Labour
North Tyneside	20	60	Labour	Labour
Oldham	20	60	Labour	Labour
Rochdale	20	60	Labour	Labour
Salford* (Note: The election for the Salford City Council ward of Walkden South (1 councillor) was postponed as a result of the death of Conservative candidate George Darlington, following a stroke on 26 April 2019. The election was held on 20 June 2019 and resulted in Labour gaining the seat from the Conservatives. – . salford.gov.uk. Retrieved 7 July 2019.)	19	60	Labour	Labour
Sandwell	24	72	Labour	Labour
Sefton	22^{+1}	66	Labour	Labour
Sheffield	28	84	Labour	Labour
Solihull	17	51	Conservative	Conservative
South Tyneside	18^{+1}	54	Labour	Labour
St Helens	16	48	Labour	Labour
Stockport	21	63	No overall control (Labour minority)	No overall control (Labour minority)
Sunderland	25^{+1}	75	Labour	Labour
Tameside	19	57	Labour	Labour
Trafford	21	63	No overall control (Labour minority with Lib Dem support)	Labour
Wakefield	21	63	Labour	Labour
Walsall	20	60	No overall control (Conservative minority)	Conservative
Wigan	25	75	Labour	Labour
Wirral	22	66	Labour	No overall control (Labour minority)
Wolverhampton	20^{+2}	60	Labour	Labour
All 33 councils	726^{+7}	2,181		

=== Unitary authorities ===
Elections took place in 47 of the 55 unitary authorities. No elections took place in Bristol, Cornwall, the Isle of Wight, Shropshire, Warrington or Wiltshire.

By-elections took place in Durham (2 seats) and Northumberland, in addition to those indicated below.

==== Whole council ====
In 30 English unitary authorities the whole council was up for election.

Unitary authorities for Bournemouth and Poole had merged with Christchurch district council to form one new unitary for the eastern portion of Dorset. An additional unitary authority replaced the remaining portion of Dorset County Council’s area and the district councils of North, West and East Dorset, Weymouth and Portland and Purbeck. Both authorities had their inaugural elections in May, and their predecessor authorities were all Conservative controlled except for Weymouth and Portland, which is in no overall control. Nine other unitary authorities were elected on new ward boundaries.

Council	Seats	Previous control	Result
Bath and North East Somerset‡	59	Conservative	Liberal Democrats
Bedford	40	No overall control (Labour/Lib Dem coalition)	No overall control (Labour/Lib Dem/Independent coalition)
Blackpool	42	Labour	Labour
Bournemouth, Christchurch and Poole*	76	New council (predecessor authorities were all Conservative)	No overall control (Lib Dem/Green/Labour/Independent coalition)
Bracknell Forest	42	Conservative	Conservative
Brighton and Hove	54	No overall control (Labour minority)	No overall control (Labour minority)
Central Bedfordshire	59	Conservative	Conservative
Cheshire East	82	Conservative	No overall control (Labour/Independent coalition)
Cheshire West and Chester‡	70	Labour	No overall control (Labour minority)
Darlington	50	Labour	No overall control (Conservative minority with Lib Dem/Independent support)
Dorset*	82	New council (all predecessors were Conservative except Weymouth and Portland)	Conservative
East Riding of Yorkshire	67	Conservative	Conservative
Herefordshire (Note: Herefordshire: the election in Ross North ward (1 councillor) has been postponed to 6 June following the death of UKIP candidate Gareth Williams. https://localcouncils.co.uk/2019/04/quit-the-elder/)	52 of 53	Conservative	No overall control (Independent/It's Our County/Green coalition)
Leicester	54	Labour	Labour
Luton	48	Labour	Labour
Medway	55	Conservative	Conservative
Middlesbrough	46	Labour	No overall control
North Lincolnshire	43	Conservative	Conservative
North Somerset	50	Conservative	No overall control (Independent/Green/Lib Dem/Labour coalition)
Nottingham‡	55	Labour	Labour
Redcar and Cleveland‡	59	No overall control (Labour minority)	No overall control (Independent/Lib Dem coalition)
Rutland‡	27	Conservative	Conservative
South Gloucestershire‡	61	Conservative	Conservative
Stockton-on-Tees	56	Labour	No overall control (Labour minority)
Stoke-on-Trent	44	No overall control (City Independents/Conservative coalition)	No overall control (City Independents/Conservative coalition)
Telford and Wrekin	54	Labour	Labour
Torbay‡	36	Conservative	No overall control (Lib Dem/Independent partnership)
West Berkshire‡	43	Conservative	Conservative
Windsor & Maidenhead‡	41	Conservative	Conservative
York	47	No overall control (Conservative/Lib Dem coalition)	No overall control (Lib Dem/Green Coalition)
All 30 councils	1,594 of 1,595		

* New council (2)
‡ New ward boundaries following an authority area boundary review (9)

==== Third of council ====
In 17 English unitary authorities one third of the council was up for election.

Council	Seats		Previous control	Result
Council	up	of	Previous control	Result
Blackburn with Darwen	17	51	Labour	Labour
Derby	17	51	No overall control (Conservative minority with UKIP/Lib Dem support)	No overall control (Conservative minority with UKIP/Lib Dem support)
Halton	19	56	Labour	Labour
Hartlepool	11	33	Labour	No overall control (Independent/Conservative coalition)
Hull	19	57	Labour	Labour
Milton Keynes	19	57	No overall control (Labour minority with Lib Dem support)	No overall control (Labour minority with Lib Dem support)
North East Lincolnshire	15^{+1}	42	No overall control (Labour minority with Lib Dem support)	Conservative
Peterborough	20	60	Conservative	No overall control (Conservative minority with Independent support)
Plymouth	19	57	Labour	Labour
Portsmouth	14^{+1}	42	No overall control (Lib Dem minority with Labour support)	No overall control (Lib Dem minority with Labour support)
Reading	15^{+1}	46	Labour	Labour
Slough	14	42	Labour	Labour
Southampton	16	48	Labour	Labour
Southend-on-Sea	17	51	Conservative	No overall control (Labour/Lib Dem/Independent coalition)
Swindon	19	57	Conservative	Conservative
Thurrock	16^{+1}	49	No overall control (Conservative minority)	No overall control (Conservative minority)
Wokingham	18	54	Conservative	Conservative
All 17 councils	285^{+4}	853		

=== Non-metropolitan districts ===
Elections took place in 168 non-metropolitan districts.

The new districts of Somerset West and Taunton, East Suffolk and West Suffolk held their first elections in 2019. They replace Taunton Deane, West Somerset, Waveney, Suffolk Coastal, Forest Heath, and St Edmundsbury.

Aylesbury Vale, Chiltern, Corby, Daventry, East Northamptonshire, Kettering, Northampton, South Bucks, South Northamptonshire, Wellingborough and Wycombe originally had elections scheduled for 2019, but the elections were postponed in law following a decision to merge these councils into unitary authorities covering Northamptonshire and Buckinghamshire.

Additionally, there were no elections in Adur, Cheltenham, Fareham, Gloucester, Gosport, Harrogate, Hastings, Huntingdonshire, Nuneaton and Bedworth, Oxford, South Cambridgeshire or Stroud.

A by-election was held in Newcastle-under-Lyme, in addition to those indicated below.

==== Whole council ====
In 121 English district authorities the whole council was up for election.

46 of these councils were electing on new ward boundaries, including six councils which normally elect by thirds: Carlisle, Crawley, Norwich, Preston, Reigate and Banstead and Runnymede. In addition, Great Yarmouth and Wyre Forest switched from thirds to whole council elections.

Council	Seats	Previous control	County	Result
Allerdale ‡	49	No overall control (Labour minority)	Cumbria	No overall control (Independent/Conservative coalition)
Arun	54	Conservative	West Sussex	No overall control (Lib Dem minority)
Ashfield	35	No overall control (Ashfield Independents minority)	Nottinghamshire	Ashfield Ind.
Ashford ‡	47	Conservative	Kent	Conservative
Babergh ‡	32	Conservative	Suffolk	No overall control (Conservative/Independent/Lib Dem coalition)
Barrow-in-Furness	36	Labour	Cumbria	Labour
Bassetlaw	48	Labour	Nottinghamshire	Labour
Blaby	39	Conservative	Leicestershire	Conservative
Bolsover ‡	37	Labour	Derbyshire	No overall control (Labour/Independent coalition)
Boston	30	Conservative	Lincolnshire	Conservative
Braintree	49	Conservative	Essex	Conservative
Breckland	49	Conservative	Norfolk	Conservative
Broadland	47	Conservative	Norfolk	Conservative
Bromsgrove	31	Conservative	Worcestershire	Conservative
Broxtowe (Note: Broxtowe: Due to the death of Conservative candidate Chris Rice, the election in Stapleford South East ward (2 councillors) has been postponed. https://localcouncils.co.uk/2019/04/have-a-happy-halliday/)	42 of 44	Conservative	Nottinghamshire	No overall control (Labour/Lib Dem/Independent coalition)
Canterbury	39	Conservative	Kent	Conservative
Carlisle ‡!	39	No overall control (Labour minority)	Cumbria	No overall control (Conservative minority with UKIP/Lib Dem/Independent support)
Charnwood	52	Conservative	Leicestershire	Conservative
Chelmsford	57	Conservative	Essex	Liberal Democrats
Chesterfield	48	Labour	Derbyshire	Labour
Chichester ‡	36	Conservative	West Sussex	No overall control (Conservative minority)
Copeland ‡	33	Labour	Cumbria	Labour
Cotswold	34	Conservative	Gloucestershire	Liberal Democrats
Crawley ‡!	36	Labour	West Sussex	Labour
Dacorum	51	Conservative	Hertfordshire	Conservative
Dartford ‡	42	Conservative	Kent	Conservative
Derbyshire Dales	39	Conservative	Derbyshire	Conservative
Dover ‡	32	Conservative	Kent	Conservative
Eastbourne ‡	27	Liberal Democrats	East Sussex	Liberal Democrats
East Cambridgeshire ‡	28	Conservative	Cambridgeshire	Conservative
East Devon ‡	60	Conservative	Devon	Independent
East Hampshire ‡	43	Conservative	Hampshire	Conservative
East Hertfordshire	50	Conservative	Hertfordshire	Conservative
East Lindsey	55	Conservative	Lincolnshire	Conservative
East Staffordshire	39	Conservative	Staffordshire	Conservative
East Suffolk *	55	New Council (both predecessor districts were Conservative)	Suffolk	Conservative
Eden	38	Conservative	Cumbria	No overall control (Lib Dem/Independent coalition with Green/Labour support)
Epsom and Ewell	38	Residents Association	Surrey	Residents Association
Erewash	47	Conservative	Derbyshire	Conservative
Fenland	39	Conservative	Cambridgeshire	Conservative
Folkestone & Hythe	30	Conservative	Kent	No overall control (Conservative minority with UKIP/Independent support)
Forest of Dean ‡ (Note: Forest of Dean: Newent & Taynton: election of 3 councillors delayed due to the death of a candidate. – Local Councils, 1 May 2019. https://twitter.com/councilsUK/status/1123716880274001920. Retrieved 3 May 2019.)	35 of 38	No overall control (Conservative minority)	Gloucestershire	No overall control (Independent/Green/Labour coalition)
Fylde	51	Conservative	Lancashire	Conservative
Gedling	41	Labour	Nottinghamshire	Labour
Gravesham	44	No overall control (Gravesham Independents minority)	Kent	Labour
Great Yarmouth •	39	Conservative	Norfolk	Conservative
Guildford	48	Conservative	Surrey	No overall control (Lib Dem minority)
Hambleton	28	Conservative	North Yorkshire	Conservative
Harborough ‡	34	Conservative	Leicestershire	Conservative
Hertsmere ‡	39	Conservative	Hertfordshire	Conservative
High Peak	43	Conservative	Derbyshire	Labour
Hinckley and Bosworth	34	Conservative	Leicestershire	Liberal Democrats
Horsham ‡	48	Conservative	West Sussex	Conservative
King's Lynn and West Norfolk ‡	55	Conservative	Norfolk	Conservative
Lancaster	60	Labour	Lancashire	No overall control (Labour/Green coalition with Lib Dem support)
Lewes ‡	41	No overall control	East Sussex	No overall control (Conservative minority)
Lichfield	47	Conservative	Staffordshire	Conservative
Maldon	31	Conservative	Essex	Conservative
Malvern Hills	38	Conservative	Worcestershire	No overall control (Independent/Lib Dem/Green coalition)
Mansfield	36	No overall control (Mansfield Independent Forum minority)	Nottinghamshire	Mansfield Independent
Melton	28	Conservative	Leicestershire	Conservative
Mendip	47	Conservative	Somerset	No overall control (Lib Dem minority)
Mid Devon	42	Conservative	Devon	No overall control (Independent/Lib Dem coalition)
Mid Suffolk ‡	34	Conservative	Suffolk	No overall control (Conservative minority)
Mid Sussex	54	Conservative	West Sussex	Conservative
New Forest	60	Conservative	Hampshire	Conservative
Newark and Sherwood †	39	Conservative	Nottinghamshire	Conservative
North Devon ‡ (Note: North Devon: the election in Chittlehampton ward (1 councillor) has been postponed due to the death of independent candidate Walter White. https://localcouncils.co.uk/2019/04/have-a-happy-halliday/)	41 of 42	No overall control (Conservative minority)	Devon	Liberal Democrats
North East Derbyshire ‡	53	Labour	Derbyshire	Conservative
North Kesteven	43	Conservative	Lincolnshire	No overall control (Conservative/Independent coalition)
North Norfolk ‡	40	No overall control	Norfolk	Liberal Democrats
North Warwickshire	35	Conservative	Warwickshire	Conservative
North West Leicestershire	38	Conservative	Leicestershire	Conservative
Norwich ‡!	39	Labour	Norfolk	Labour
Oadby and Wigston	26	Liberal Democrats	Leicestershire	Liberal Democrats
Preston ‡!	48	Labour	Lancashire	Labour
Reigate and Banstead ‡!	45	Conservative	Surrey	Conservative
Ribble Valley ‡	40	Conservative	Lancashire	Conservative
Richmondshire ‡	24	Conservative	North Yorkshire	No overall control (Independent/Lib Dem/Green coalition)
Rother ‡	38	Conservative	East Sussex	No overall control (Independent/Lib Dem/Labour/Green coalition)
Runnymede ‡!	41	Conservative	Surrey	Conservative
Rushcliffe	44	Conservative	Nottinghamshire	Conservative
Ryedale	30	No overall control (Conservative minority)	North Yorkshire	No overall control (Conservative/Independent coalition)
Scarborough ‡	46	No overall control (Conservative minority)	North Yorkshire	No overall control (Labour minority)
Sedgemoor	48	Conservative	Somerset	Conservative
Selby	31	Conservative	North Yorkshire	Conservative
Sevenoaks †	54	Conservative	Kent	Conservative
Somerset West and Taunton *	59	New Council (both predecessor districts were Conservative)	Somerset	Liberal Democrats
South Derbyshire	36	Conservative	Derbyshire	Conservative
South Hams	31	Conservative	Devon	Conservative
South Holland	37	Conservative	Lincolnshire	Conservative
South Kesteven	56	Conservative	Lincolnshire	Conservative
South Norfolk ‡	46	Conservative	Norfolk	Conservative
South Oxfordshire †	36	Conservative	Oxfordshire	No overall control (Lib Dem/Green coalition)
South Ribble (Note: South Ribble: Farington West: election of 2 councillors delayed due to the death of a candidate. – Local Councils, 1 May 2019. https://twitter.com/councilsUK/status/1123716880274001920. Retrieved 3 May 2019.)	48 of 50	Conservative	Lancashire	No overall control (Labour minority with Lib Dem support)
South Somerset ‡	60	Liberal Democrats	Somerset	Liberal Democrats
South Staffordshire (Note: South Staffordshire: the election in Wombourne South West ward (2 councillors) has been postponed to 6 June due to the death of Conservative candidate Mary Bond. https://localcouncils.co.uk/2019/04/have-a-happy-halliday/)	47 of 49	Conservative	Staffordshire	Conservative
Spelthorne	39	Conservative	Surrey	Conservative
Stafford	40	Conservative	Staffordshire	Conservative
Staffordshire Moorlands	56	Conservative	Staffordshire	No overall control (Conservative minority)
Stratford-on-Avon	36	Conservative	Warwickshire	Conservative
Surrey Heath ‡	35	Conservative	Surrey	Conservative
Swale	47	Conservative	Kent	No overall control (Labour/Independent/Lib Dem/Green coalition)
Teignbridge ‡	47	Conservative	Devon	Liberal Democrats
Tendring ‡ (Note: Tendring: the election in St Osyth ward (2 councillors) has been postponed to 23 May following the death of Conservative candidate Anita Bailey. https://www.halsteadgazette.co.uk/news/north_essex_news/17564047.tributes-paid-to-dedicated-parish-councillor/)	46 of 48	Conservative	Essex	No overall control (Conservative minority with UKIP/Independent support)
Test Valley ‡	43	Conservative	Hampshire	Conservative
Tewkesbury ‡	38	Conservative	Gloucestershire	Conservative
Thanet	56	No overall control	Kent	No overall control (Conservative minority)
Tonbridge and Malling	54	Conservative	Kent	Conservative
Torridge ‡	36	Conservative	Devon	No overall control (Independent minority)
Uttlesford	39	Conservative	Essex	R4U
Vale of White Horse †	38	Conservative	Oxfordshire	Liberal Democrats
Warwick ‡	44	Conservative	Warwickshire	No overall control (Conservative minority with Residents Association support)
Waverley	57	Conservative	Surrey	No overall control (Lib Dem/Residents Association coalition)
Wealden ‡	45	Conservative	East Sussex	Conservative
West Devon	31	Conservative	Devon	Conservative
West Lindsey	36	Conservative	Lincolnshire	Conservative
West Suffolk *	64	New Council (both predecessor districts were Conservative)	Suffolk	Conservative
Wychavon	45	Conservative	Worcestershire	Conservative
Wyre	50	Conservative	Lancashire	Conservative
Wyre Forest •	33	Conservative	Worcestershire	No overall control (Independent/Lib Dem/Labour/Green coalition)
All 121 councils	5,123 of 5,135			

* New council (3)
† Minor ward boundary changes due to parish boundary changes (4)
‡ New ward boundaries following a district boundary review (42)
! Returns to electing by thirds next year (6)
• Previously elected by thirds (2)

==== Third of council ====
In 47 English district authorities, one-third of the council was up for election.

Seven other district councils normally elect by thirds. As noted above, due to boundary changes, six of these have all-up elections. Daventry originally had elections scheduled for 2019, but the elections were postponed following a decision to merge the seven districts of Northamptonshire into two unitary authorities covering the county from 2020.

Council	Seats		Previous control	County	Result
Council	up	of	Previous control	County	Result
Amber Valley	15	45	Conservative	Derbyshire	Labour
Basildon	14	42	Conservative	Essex	No overall control (Conservative minority with UKIP support)
Basingstoke and Deane	20	60	Conservative	Hampshire	Conservative
Brentwood	12	37	Conservative	Essex	Conservative
Broxbourne	10^{+1}	30	Conservative	Hertfordshire	Conservative
Burnley	15	45	Labour	Lancashire	No overall control (Independent/Lib Dem/Conservative coalition with UKIP/Green support)
Cambridge	14^{+2}	42	Labour	Cambridgeshire	Labour
Cannock Chase	15	41	Labour	Staffordshire	No overall control (Labour minority)
Castle Point	14	41	Conservative	Essex	Conservative
Cherwell	16^{+1}	48	Conservative	Oxfordshire	Conservative
Chorley	15	47	Labour	Lancashire	Labour
Colchester	17	51	No overall control (Lib Dem/Labour/Independent Coalition)	Essex	No overall control (Lib Dem/Labour/Independent Coalition)
Craven	10^{+1}	30	Conservative	North Yorkshire	No overall control
Eastleigh	13	39	Liberal Democrats	Hampshire	Liberal Democrats
Elmbridge	16	48	No overall control (Conservative minority)	Surrey	No overall control (Lib Dem/Residents Association coalition)
Epping Forest	18	58	Conservative	Essex	Conservative
Exeter	13^{+1}	39	Labour	Devon	Labour
Harlow	11	33	Labour	Essex	Labour
Hart	11^{+1}	33	No overall control	Hampshire	No overall control
Havant	10^{+1}	38	Conservative	Hampshire	Conservative
Hyndburn	12	35	Labour	Lancashire	Labour
Ipswich	16	48	Labour	Suffolk	Labour
Lincoln	11	33	Labour	Lincolnshire	Labour
Maidstone	18	55	No overall control (Lib Dem minority with Independent support)	Kent	No overall control (Lib Dem minority with Independent/Labour support)
Mole Valley	14	41	Conservative	Surrey	Liberal Democrats
North Hertfordshire	16	49	Conservative	Hertfordshire	No overall control (Labour/Lib Dem Coalition)
Pendle	17	49	Conservative	Lancashire	No overall control (Labour/Lib Dem coalition)
Redditch	10	29	Conservative	Worcestershire	Conservative
Rochford	13	39	Conservative	Essex	Conservative
Rossendale	12	36	Labour	Lancashire	Labour
Rugby	14	42	Conservative	Warwickshire	Conservative
Rushmoor	13	39	Conservative	Hampshire	Conservative
St Albans	20^{+1}	58	Conservative	Hertfordshire	No overall control (Liberal Democrat minority with Green/Independent support)
South Lakeland	16	51	Liberal Democrats	Cumbria	Liberal Democrats
Stevenage	13	39	Labour	Hertfordshire	Labour
Tamworth	10	30	Conservative	Staffordshire	Conservative
Tandridge	14	42	Conservative	Surrey	No overall control (Conservative minority)
Three Rivers	13^{+1}	39	Liberal Democrats	Hertfordshire	Liberal Democrats
Tunbridge Wells	16^{+2}	48	Conservative	Kent	Conservative
Watford	12^{+1}	36	Liberal Democrats	Hertfordshire	Liberal Democrats
Welwyn Hatfield	16^{+2}	48	Conservative	Hertfordshire	No overall control (Conservative minority)
West Lancashire	18	54	Labour	Lancashire	Labour
West Oxfordshire	16	49	Conservative	Oxfordshire	Conservative
Winchester	16	45	Conservative	Hampshire	Liberal Democrats
Woking	10	30	No overall control	Surrey	No overall control (Conservative minority)
Worcester	11	35	No overall control	Worcestershire	No overall control (Conservative/Labour coalition)
Worthing	11	37	Conservative	West Sussex	Conservative
All 47 councils	657^{+15}	1,983			

=== Mayoral elections ===
Six direct mayoral elections were held. Five are for local authorities (the Mayoralty of Torbay is abolished this year):

Local Authority	Incumbent Mayor	Result
Bedford	Dave Hodgson (Lib Dem)	Dave Hodgson (Lib Dem)
Copeland	Mike Starkie (Ind)	Mike Starkie (Ind)
Leicester	Peter Soulsby (Lab)	Peter Soulsby (Lab)
Mansfield	Kate Allsop (MIF)	Andy Abrahams (Lab)
Middlesbrough	Dave Budd (Lab)	Andy Preston (Ind)

One election was held for a regional mayor: this newly established combined authority was set up by groups of local councils, much like similar devolution deals across the country, giving the combined authorities additional powers and funding.

Combined authority	Interim mayor/chair	Result	Details
North of Tyne	Norma Redfearn (Lab)	Jamie Driscoll (Labour Co-op)	Details

== Northern Ireland ==
In Northern Ireland, local elections were last held in 2014. No party held a working majority on any council (proportional representation makes this less likely) before the 2019 election, although the Democratic Unionist Party came close on Lisburn and Castlereagh City Council, with half of the seats.

The Electoral Office for Northern Ireland published lists and total numbers of candidates, showing that a total of 819 persons were nominated to stand. Elections are by single transferable vote in 5- to 7-member district electoral areas.

Council	Seats	Largest party before election	Largest party after election
Belfast	60	Sinn Féin (19)	Sinn Féin (18)
Ards & North Down	40	DUP (17)	DUP (14)
Antrim & Newtownabbey	40	DUP (15)	DUP (14)
Lisburn & Castlereagh	40	DUP (20)	DUP (15)
Newry, Mourne & Down	41	Sinn Féin (14)	Sinn Féin (16)
Newry, Mourne & Down	41	SDLP (14)	
Armagh, Banbridge & Craigavon	41	DUP (13)	DUP (11)
Mid & East Antrim	40	DUP (16)	DUP (15)
Causeway Coast & Glens	40	DUP (11)	DUP (14)
Mid Ulster	40	Sinn Féin (18)	Sinn Féin (17)
Derry & Strabane	40	Sinn Féin (16)	Sinn Féin (11)
Derry & Strabane	40		SDLP (11)
Fermanagh & Omagh	40	Sinn Féin (17)	Sinn Féin (15)
All eleven councils	462	DUP (130)	DUP (122)

== Scotland ==
The council by-election in Scotland (seat previously Labour) was won by the Scottish National Party, resulting in the party taking control of Dundee City Council.
