= 2019 Mole Valley District Council election =

English local election

Results of the 2019 Mole Valley District Council election

The 2019 Mole Valley District Council election took place on 2 May 2019 to elect approximately one-third of members to Mole Valley District Council in England, coinciding with other local elections held simultaneously across 248 councils in England and all 11 councils in Northern Ireland. The 2019 Mole Valley local election outcomes are outlined below in the summary results chart and the detailed results charts for each ward. The 2019 election results are compared (in terms of percentage points gained or lost) against the results when these wards were last contested four years previously, on the same day as the General Election of May 2015. The difference in the results for certain political parties is stark. This is largely influenced by an excellent result for the Conservatives on their general election winning day in May 2015, but a terrible result for the Conservatives in May 2019 when, nationally, the Government of Theresa May had failed to ‘deliver Brexit’ by the anticipated date of 29 March 2019. But even taking the national backdrops of these two very different local elections into account, it was still a spectacularly poor set of results for the Conservatives in Mole Valley in these 2019 local elections and a very good set of results for the Liberal Democrats. Some Mole Valley wards did not hold a local election in 2019, being contested instead in even-numbered years.

== Summary of Results ==
Mole Valley District Council Election, 2019
Party	Seats	Gains	Losses	Net gain/loss	Seats %	Votes %	Votes	+/−
Liberal Democrats	11	9	0	+9	78.6	50.4	9,680	+21.9
Conservative	2	0	10	-10	14.3	24.5	4,697	-21.8
Green	0	0	0	0	0.0	8.1	1,555	+1.2
Ashtead Independents	1	1	0	+1	7.1	6.6	1,277	+3.0
UKIP	0	0	0	0	0.0	5.1	988	-6.1
Labour	0	0	0	0	0.0	3.9	746	+0.4
Independent	0	0	0	0	0.0	1.2	234	N/A
SDP	0	0	0	0	0.0	0.2	32	N/A

== Results by Ward ==
=== Ashtead Village ===
Ashtead Village
Party	Candidate	Votes	%	±%
Ashtead Independent	Chris Hunt	1,277	67.3	+35.3
Liberal Democrats	Rita Antonelli	236	12.4	+7.6
Conservative	Angus Fraser Gillan	219	11.5	−40.6
Green	Jacquetta Jane Fewster	85	4.5	+0.3
Labour	Clive George Scott	80	4.2	−2.8
Majority		1,041	54.9	
Turnout			40.5	
Ashtead Independent gain from Conservative				

=== Beare Green ===
Beare Green
Party	Candidate	Votes	%	±%
Liberal Democrats	Caroline Mary Salmon	355	51.8	+20.1
Conservative	Michelle Watson	220	32.1	−7.1
UKIP	Ian Bignell	68	9.9	−12.7
Green	Muriel Lily Passmore	22	3.2	−3.3
Labour	Christine Mary Foster	20	2.9	N/A
Majority		135	19.7	
Turnout			44.6	
Liberal Democrats gain from Conservative		Swing		

=== Bookham North ===
Bookham North
Party	Candidate	Votes	%	±%
Liberal Democrats	Roger Martin Adams	1,217	67.6	+43.1
Green	Richard Essex	455	25.3	+16.3
Labour	Marc Patrick Green	128	7.1	N/A
Majority		762	42.3	
Turnout			41.0	
Liberal Democrats gain from Conservative		Swing		

=== Bookham South ===
Bookham South
Party	Candidate	Votes	%	±%
Liberal Democrats	Nancy Julia Goodacre	1,321	61.0	+29.8
Conservative	John Frederick Chandler	648	29.9	−21.8
Green	Damian Michael McDevitt	158	7.3	+0.1
Labour	Giles Cawley	40	1.8	N/A
Majority		673	31.1	
Turnout			49.1	
Liberal Democrats gain from Conservative		Swing		

=== Box Hill & Headley ===
Box Hill & Headley
Party	Candidate	Votes	%	±%
Liberal Democrats	David Kennaugh Preedy	449	54.8	+14.0
Conservative	Malcolm Bailey Ladell	276	33.7	−7.4
UKIP	Marion Caroline Woodville	95	11.6	−12.8
Majority		173	21.1	
Turnout			51.0	
Liberal Democrats gain from Conservative		Swing		

=== Brockham, Betchworth and Buckland ===
Brockham, Betchworth and Buckland
Party	Candidate	Votes	%	±%
Liberal Democrats	Paul James Potter	787	45.8	+8.9
Conservative	John Edwin Muggeridge	636	37.0	−8.5
Green	Roger Abbot	260	15.1	+9.8
Labour	Kevin Alan Stroud	35	2.0	−1.8
Majority		151	8.8	
Turnout			48.2	
Liberal Democrats gain from Conservative		Swing		

=== Capel, Leigh and Newdigate ===
Capel, Leigh and Newdigate
Party	Candidate	Votes	%	±%
Liberal Democrats	Lesley Jean Bushnell	835	50.9	+34.5
Conservative	Corinna Osborne-Patterson	586	35.7	−20.4
UKIP	Geoff Cox	154	9.4	−8.7
Green	John Francis Roche	65	4.0	−5.3
Majority		269	15.2	
Turnout			49.8	
Liberal Democrats gain from Conservative		Swing		

=== Charlwood ===
Charlwood
Party	Candidate	Votes	%	±%
Conservative	Charles Iain Yarwood	282	46.4	−17.2
Green	Lisa Claire Scott	171	28.1	+21.7
UKIP	Marjorie Joan Dixon	86	14.1	−4.0
Liberal Democrats	Timothy Edward Brooks	69	11.3	−0.5
Majority		111	18.3	
Turnout			33.4	
Conservative hold		Swing		

=== Dorking South ===
Dorking South
Party	Candidate	Votes	%	±%
Liberal Democrats	Stephen John Cooksey	1,632	67.6	+27.9
Conservative	Roger Edwin Riseley Jones	450	18.6	−17.2
Labour	James Rushcombe Stringer	172	7.1	−0.2
UKIP	Michael John Hird Foulston	159	6.6	−1.4
Majority		1,182	49.0	
Turnout			42.2	
Liberal Democrats hold		Swing		

=== Holmwoods ===
Holmwoods
Party	Candidate	Votes	%	±%
Liberal Democrats	Claire Philomena Malcolmson	912	54.3	+4.1
Conservative	Fiona Gail Meadows	336	20.0	−10.7
UKIP	Margaret Mary Curran	196	11.7	−0.8
Green	Tracey Harwood	120	7.2	+0.6
Labour	Laurence Paul Nasskau	80	4.8	N/A
SDP	Pip English	32	1.9	N/A
Majority		576	34.3	
Turnout			35.0	
Liberal Democrats hold		Swing		

=== Leatherhead North ===
Leatherhead North
Party	Candidate	Votes	%	±%
Liberal Democrats	Keira Rowena Vyvyan-Robinson	726	42.6	+13.3
Conservative	Paul Patrick Purcell	564	33.1	−0.9
Labour	Mark John Coote	175	10.3	−4.3
UKIP	David Gordon Payne	154	9.0	−9.3
Green	Vicki Elcoate	87	5.1	+1.2
Majority		162	9.5	
Turnout			32.5	
Liberal Democrats gain from Conservative		Swing		

=== Leith Hill ===
Leith Hill
Party	Candidate	Votes	%	±%
Liberal Democrats	Hazel Valerie Ann Watson	532	76.1	+32.2
Conservative	David Karim Mir	138	19.7	−27.9
Green	Lucy Jane Barford	29	4.1	−0.3
Majority		394	56.4	
Turnout			53.0	
Liberal Democrats gain from Conservative		Swing		

=== Mickleham, Westhumble & Pixham ===
Mickleham, Westhumble & Pixham
Party	Candidate	Votes	%	±%
Liberal Democrats	Elsie Rosam	440	53.1	+13.7
Independent	David Campbell Irvine	234	28.3	−18.1
Conservative	Gavin Timothy Charles Musgrave	102	12.3	−34.1
Green	Susan McGrath	36	4.3	−3.2
Labour	Kim Rosslyn Coote	16	1.9	N/A
Majority		206	24.8	
Turnout			54.7	
Liberal Democrats gain from Conservative		Swing		

Note: David Campbell Irvine was the sitting councillor, having been elected as a Conservative in 2015.

=== Okewood ===
Okewood
Party	Candidate	Votes	%	±%
Conservative	Helyn Clack	240	43.5	−11.9
Liberal Democrats	Steven Robert Round	169	30.6	+17.7
UKIP	Leigh Jones	76	13.8	−3.8
Green	Jennifer Lindsay Smith	67	12.1	−2.1
Majority		71	12.9	
Turnout			38.1	
Conservative hold		Swing		
