= 2019 Forest of Dean District Council election =

2019 UK local government election

- 2 May 2019

All 38 seats to Forest of Dean District Council 20 seats needed for a majority

	First party	Second party	Third party
Party	Independent	Conservative	Liberal Democrats
Last election	6 seats, 10.0%	21 seats, 34.1%	0 seats, 2.6%
Seats won	15	10	2
Seat change	▲9	▼11	▲2
Popular vote	10,409	12,197	2,093
Percentage	25.6%	30.0%	5.2%
Swing	▲15.6%	▼4.1%	▲2.6%
	Fourth party	Fifth party
Party	Green	Labour
Last election	1 seat, 10.2%	13 seats, 26.3%
Seats won	6	5
Seat change	▲5	▼8
Popular vote	8,775	6,660
Percentage	21.6%	16.4%
Swing	▲11.4%	▼9.9%
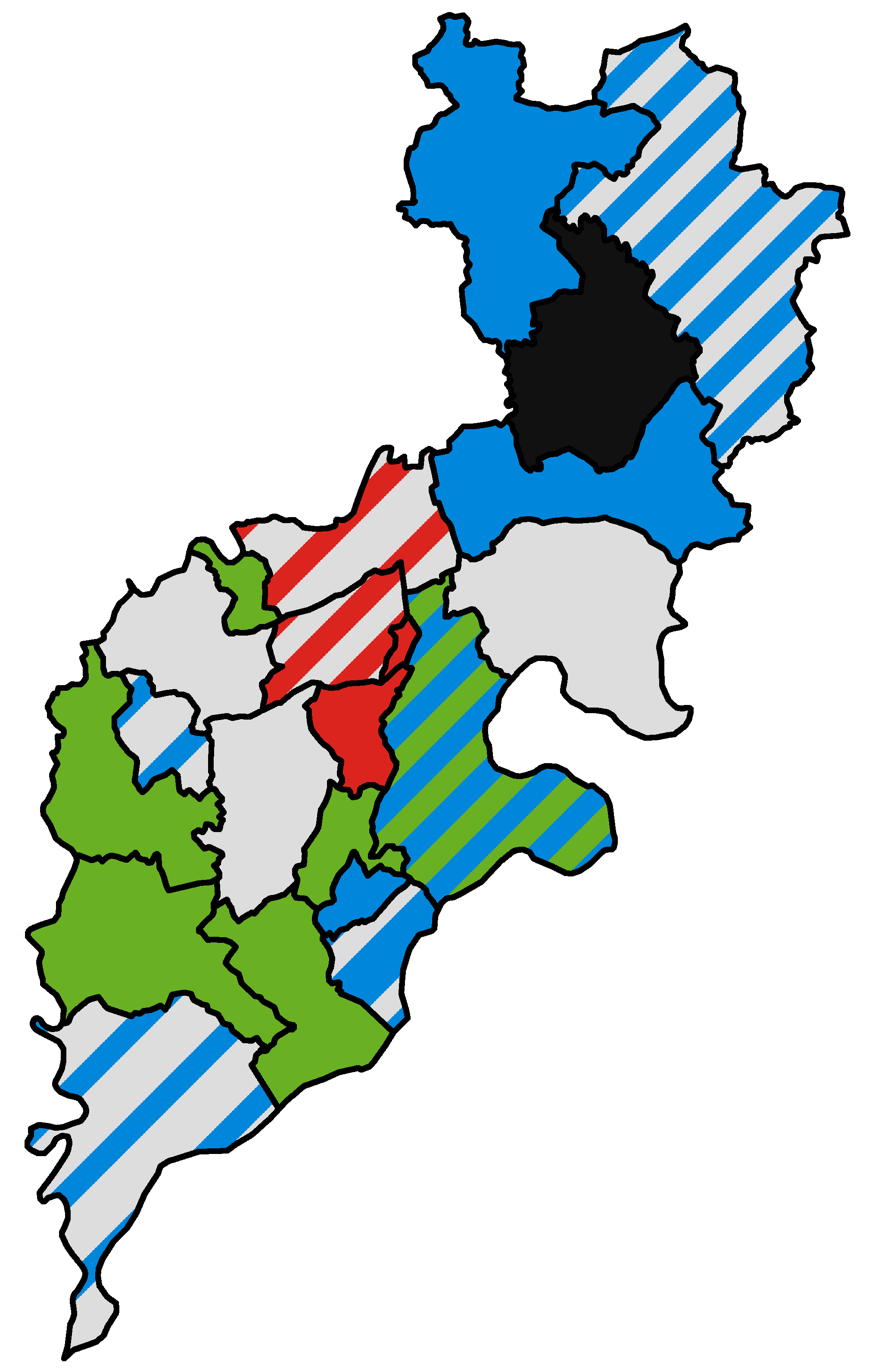
- 2019 local election results in the Forest of Dean
Leader of the council before election
Tim Gwilliam
Independent
Leader of the council after election
Tim Gwilliam
Independent

The 2019 Forest of Dean District Council election was held on 2 May 2019 as part of the 2019 United Kingdom local elections. This was the first election in the Forest of Dean following a boundary review, which reduced the total number of Councillors from 48 to 38. Due to the boundary review, party seat changes in the summary box (right) are based on notional results, not the actual 2015 results.

== Summary ==
=== Background ===
Only the Conservatives fielded candidates for all 38 seats. The Green Party fielded 27 candidates, Labour 24, the Liberal Democrats 5 and UKIP 2. There were 24 independent candidates.

A Green Party candidate standing in Newent & Taynton ward, David Richard Humphreys, died whilst canvassing for the party, causing the election to be postponed to 20 June 2019.

=== Election result ===
2019 Forest of Dean District Council election
Party	Candidates	Seats	Gains	Losses	Net gain/loss	Seats %	Votes %	Votes	+/−
Independent	25	15	N/A	N/A	▲9	39.5	25.6	10,409	+15.6
Conservative	38	10	N/A	N/A	▼11	26.3	30.0	12,197	–4.1
Green	27	6	N/A	N/A	▲5	15.8	21.6	8,775	+11.4
Labour	24	5	N/A	N/A	▼8	13.2	16.4	6,660	–9.9
Liberal Democrats	6	2	N/A	N/A	▲2	5.3	5.2	2,093	+2.6
UKIP	2	0	N/A	N/A	▼7	0.0	1.2	472	–15.3

=== Council composition ===
Party	2015 election	Pre-2019 election*	2019 election
Independent	6	15	15
Conservative	21	19	10
Green	1	2	6
Labour	13	9	5
UKIP	7	3	0
Liberal Democrats	0	0	2
Vacant	0	0	0
Total	48	48	38

Changes since the 2015 election are due to defections and by-elections.

=== Aftermath ===
Following the election, an administration was formed between the Independents, Green and Labour councillors. Tim Gwilliam, an independent councillor who had served as Leader of the Council since July 2017, was re-elected as leader. A cabinet was formed consisting of two Independents, two Green and two Labour members.

== Ward results ==
=== Berry Hill ===
Berry Hill (2 seats)
Party	Candidate	Votes	%	±%
Independent	Tim Gwilliam	727	60.2	
Independent	Michelle Claire Mumford	370	30.6	
Conservative	Nigel John Bluett	319	26.4	
Conservative	Marrilyn Jane Smart	260	21.5	
Green	Richard Noel Henson	251	20.8	
Green	Mike Smith	163	13.5	
Turnout		1,208		
Rejected ballots		3	0.2	
Independent win (new seat)				
Independent win (new seat)				

=== Bream ===
Bream (2 seats)
Party	Candidate	Votes	%	±%
Independent	Richard Nicholas Leppington	651	48.5	
Independent	Paul John Hiett	442	32.9	
Labour	Steve Crick	335	25.0	
Green	Rachel Cameron	261	19.4	
Green	Jackie Dale	237	17.7	
Conservative	Alan Roy John Bensted	198	14.8	
Conservative	Liz Stuart	159	11.8	
Turnout		1,342		
Registered electors		3,740		
Rejected ballots		9	0.7	
Independent win (new seat)				
Independent win (new seat)				

=== Cinderford East ===
Cinderford East (2 seats)
Party	Candidate	Votes	%	±%
Labour	Max Coborn	424	55.4	
Labour	Di Martin	417	54.4	
Independent	Jeremy Paul Charlton-Wright	224	29.2	
Conservative	Grace Bensted	159	20.8	
Conservative	Pamela Kay Plummer	123	16.1	
Turnout		766		
Rejected ballots		11	1.4	
Labour win (new seat)				
Labour win (new seat)				

=== Cinderford West ===
Cinderford West (2 seats)
Party	Candidate	Votes	%	±%
Independent	Mark David Turner	317	41.5	
Labour	Lynn Iris Sterry	288	37.7	
Labour	Roger Anthony Sterry	284	37.2	
Conservative	Catherine Alys Broadhead	141	18.5	
Green	Jill Raymond	132	17.3	
Conservative	Roger Burgess Newton Stuart	113	14.8	
Green	Piers Gawain Chivers	70	9.2	
Turnout		763		
Rejected ballots		11	1.4	
Independent win (new seat)				
Labour win (new seat)				

=== Coleford ===
Coleford (3 seats)
Party	Candidate	Votes	%	±%
Independent	Clive Terence Elsmore	712	46.3	
Independent	Ian Richard Whitburn	486	31.6	
Conservative	Carole Ann Allaway Martin	458	29.8	
Green	Beth Llewellyn	420	27.3	
Conservative	David William Easton	379	24.7	
Labour	James Bricis	325	21.1	
Conservative	Denis Riley	315	20.5	
Labour	Neil Hampson	300	19.5	
Liberal Democrats	Heather Margaret Lusty	268	17.4	
Green	Bhogini Vieira	164	10.7	
Turnout		1,537		
Rejected ballots		3	0.2	
Independent win (new seat)				
Independent win (new seat)				
Conservative win (new seat)				

=== Dymock ===
Dymock (1 seat)
Party	Candidate	Votes	%	±%
Conservative	Roger Yeates	432	65.3	
Green	Bob Rhodes	230	34.7	
Turnout		662		
Rejected ballots		8	1.2	
Conservative win (new seat)				

=== Hartpury & Redmarley ===
Hartpury & Redmarley (2 seats)
Party	Candidate	Votes	%	±%
Independent	Philip Howard Joseph Burford	850	59.4	
Conservative	Brian Cecil Lewis	546	38.2	
Conservative	Clayton Williams	519	36.3	
Green	John Edward Thomas Turvill	421	29.4	
Turnout		1,430		
Rejected ballots		3	0.2	
Independent win (new seat)				
Conservative win (new seat)				

=== Longhope & Huntley ===
Longhope & Huntley (2 seats)
Party	Candidate	Votes	%	±%
Conservative	Brian Richard Robinson	549	51.3	
Conservative	Brian Anthony Jones	493	46.1	
Green	Jane Prescott	460	43.0	
Labour	Toby Alexander Flitton	267	25.0	
Turnout		1,070		
Rejected ballots		33	3.0	
Conservative win (new seat)				
Conservative win (new seat)				

=== Lydbrook ===
Lydbrook (1 seat)
Party	Candidate	Votes	%	±%
Green	Sid Phelps	500	67.4	
Independent	Matthew James Williams	213	28.7	
Conservative	Zehra Zaidi	29	3.9	
Turnout		742		
Rejected ballots		3	0.4	
Green win (new seat)				

=== Lydney East ===
Lydney East (3 seats)
Party	Candidate	Votes	%	±%
Conservative	Alan Preest	475	39.5	
Independent	James Arthur Bevan	441	36.6	
Conservative	Claire Elizabeth Vaughan	360	29.9	
Independent	Bill Osborne	282	23.4	
Labour	Zac Arnold	273	22.7	
Independent	Roger Ashley Jean Wilkinson	221	18.4	
Green	James Carwithen Greenwood	220	18.3	
Labour	Louis Neal Arnold	214	17.8	
Labour	Mel Farrant	207	17.2	
Conservative	Robert Francis Garside	194	16.1	
Green	Rachel Ann Pardoe	190	15.8	
Turnout		1,204		
Rejected ballots		22	1.8	
Conservative win (new seat)				
Independent win (new seat)				
Conservative win (new seat)				

=== Lydney North ===
Lydney North (1 seat)
Party	Candidate	Votes	%	±%
Conservative	Harry Joseph Ives	270	43.7	
Labour	Louise Penny	157	25.4	
Independent	Phoebe Winter Coleman-Wood	99	16.0	
Green	Jane Margaret Carr	92	14.9	
Turnout		618		
Rejected ballots		6	1.0	
Conservative win (new seat)				

=== Lydney West & Aylburton ===
Lydney West & Aylburton (1 seat)
Party	Candidate	Votes	%	±%
Green	Mark Topping	285	40.9	
Conservative	Jim Simpson	273	39.2	
Labour	Steve Stockham	139	19.9	
Turnout		697		
Rejected ballots		15	2.1	
Green win (new seat)				

=== Mitcheldean, Ruardean & Drybrook ===
Mitcheldean, Ruardean & Drybrook (3 seats)
Party	Candidate	Votes	%	±%
Independent	Andrew Edward Gardiner	665	35.6	
Labour	Jackie Fraser	605	32.4	
Independent	Thom Forester	556	29.8	
Labour	Douglas Martin Scott	464	24.8	
Labour	Shaun Stammers	428	22.9	
Green	Jackie Orman	419	22.4	
Conservative	Philip John Robinson	404	21.6	
Conservative	Sarah Jane Cuthbert	356	19.1	
Liberal Democrats	Sue Henchley	340	18.2	
Conservative	Jane Henson Horne	310	16.6	
UKIP	Roy Bardo	296	15.8	
Turnout		1,868		
Rejected ballots		6	0.3	
Independent win (new seat)				
Labour win (new seat)				
Independent win (new seat)				

=== Newent & Taynton ===
Newent & Taynton (3 seats)
Party	Candidate	Votes	%	±%
Independent	Julia Denise Gooch	551	30.1	
Liberal Democrats	Gill Moseley	462	25.2	
Liberal Democrats	Vilnis Oliver Vesma	423	23.1	
Conservative	Len Lawton	404	22.0	
Conservative	Eli Heathfield	392	21.4	
Green	David John Price	306	16.7	
Green	Bob Rhodes	282	15.4	
Liberal Democrats	Steve Martin	266	14.5	
Green	Johnny Back	251	13.7	
Conservative	Nick Winter	217	11.8	
Independent	Edward Hugh Wood	175	9.5	
Independent	Simon Holmes	170	9.3	
Labour	Jean Sampson	110	6.0	
Turnout		1,833		
Rejected ballots		6	0.3	
Independent win (new seat)				
Liberal Democrats win (new seat)				
Liberal Democrats win (new seat)				

- On 29 April 2019, it was announced that David Richard Humphreys died whilst canvassing for the Green Party. The election for the ward was then held on 20 June.

=== Newland & Sling ===
Newland & Sling (1 seat)
Party	Candidate	Votes	%	±%
Green	David Andrew John Wheeler	347	42.8	
Independent	Roger John James	208	25.7	
Conservative	Terry Hale	198	24.4	
Labour	Sally Reader	57	7.0	
Turnout		810		
Rejected ballots		2	0.2	
Green win (new seat)				

=== Newnham ===
Newnham (2 seats)
Party	Candidate	Votes	%	±%
Green	Nicky Packer	813	57.5	
Conservative	Richard Henry Boyles	571	40.4	
Labour	Stephen Robert Miller	519	36.7	
Conservative	Gareth Rhys Hughes	497	35.1	
Turnout		1,415		
Rejected ballots		25	1.7	
Green win (new seat)				
Conservative win (new seat)				

=== Pillowell ===
Pillowell (1 seat)
Party	Candidate	Votes	%	±%
Green	Andy Moore	266	38.3	
UKIP	Alan Philip Grant	176	25.3	
Conservative	Frankie Evans	134	19.3	
Labour	Elizabeth June Pugh	119	17.1	
Turnout		695		
Rejected ballots		4	0.6	
Green win (new seat)				

=== Ruspidge ===
Ruspidge (1 seat)
Party	Candidate	Votes	%	±%
Labour	Bernard Anthony O'Neill	268	59.4	
Conservative	Grant Stephen Hughes	183	40.6	
Turnout		451		
Rejected ballots		26	5.5	
Labour win (new seat)				

=== St Briavels ===
St Briavels (1 seat)
Party	Candidate	Votes	%	±%
Green	Chris McFarling	870	80.9	
Conservative	Patrick Christopher John Molyneux	205	19.1	
Turnout		1,075		
Rejected ballots		15	1.4	
Green win (new seat)				

=== Tidenham ===
Tidenham (3 seats)
Party	Candidate	Votes	%	±%
Conservative	Nick Evans	635	35.3	
Independent	Maria Edwards	617	34.3	
Independent	Helen Mary Molyneux	580	32.2	
Green	Adrian Birch	468	26.0	
Conservative	Judy Davis	402	22.3	
Conservative	John Rodney Fox	388	21.6	
Independent	Gethyn Joffre Davies	366	20.3	
Green	Fiona Bowie	344	19.1	
Liberal Democrats	Peter Harrison Brown	334	18.6	
Green	Sophie Jane Blacksell Jones	313	17.4	
Labour	Angela Farrant	203	11.3	
Labour	Roger Edward Holmes	174	9.7	
Turnout		1,800		
Rejected ballots		10	0.6	
Conservative win (new seat)				
Independent win (new seat)				
Independent win (new seat)				

=== Westbury-on-Severn ===
Westbury-on-Severn (1 seat)
Party	Candidate	Votes	%	±%
Independent	Simon Charles Phelps	437	61.9	
Conservative	Kate Elisabeth Robinson	137	19.4	
Labour	Benjamin Elliott Garrick Webb	83	11.8	
Independent	Gwyn John Evans	49	6.9	
Turnout		706		
Rejected ballots		3	0.4	
Independent win (new seat)				

== By-elections ==
=== Berry Hill ===
Berry Hill, 6 May 2021
Party	Candidate	Votes	%	±%
Independent	Jamie Elsmore	561	40.7	+10.1
Conservative	Terry Hale	400	29.0	+2.6
Green	Melanie Getgood	199	14.4	−6.4
Labour	Matt Bishop	185	13.4	N/A
Liberal Democrats	John Taylerson	33	2.4	N/A
Turnout		1,378	37	
Independent hold		Swing		

=== Cinderford East ===
Cinderford East, 6 May 2021
Party	Candidate	Votes	%	±%
Labour	Shaun Stammers	362	39.5	−15.9
Conservative	Carol Thomas	319	34.8	+14.0
Green	Carl Picton	152	16.6	N/A
Independent	Jeremy Charlton-Wright	83	9.1	−20.1
Turnout		916	27	
Labour hold		Swing		
