= 2019 South Ribble Borough Council election =

2019 UK local government election

Map of the results of the 2019 South Ribble Borough Council election. Conservatives in blue, Labour in red and Liberal Democrats in yellow.

Local elections were held for South Ribble Borough Council on 2 May 2019, the same day as other 2019 United Kingdom local elections. It resulted in the council going into no overall control (was previously Conservative controlled) with Labour taking charge after an agreement with the Liberal Democrats.

== Results summary ==
The results of the 2019 elections are summarised below.

2019 South Ribble Borough Council election
Party	This election			Full council			This election		
Party	Seats	Net	Seats %	Other	Total	Total %	Votes	Votes %	+/−
Conservative	23	▼6	46.0	0	23	46.0	27,516	42.8	
Labour	22	▲3	44.0	0	22	44.0	19,816	30.8	
Liberal Democrats	5	▲3	10.0	0	5	10.0	9,391	14.6	
UKIP	0	Steady	0.0	0	0	0.0	1,332	2.1	
Independent	0	Steady	0.0	0	0	0.0	905	1.4	

== Ward results ==
=== Bamber Bridge East ===
Bamber Bridge East
Party	Candidate	Votes	%	±%
Labour	Mick Higgins	474	53.0	
Labour	Christine Melia	433	48.4	
Conservative	Paul Watson	303	33.9	
Conservative	Ashley Karmanski	269	30.1	
UKIP	Marie Forshaw	241	27.0	
Majority				
Turnout		894	26.8	
Labour hold		Swing		
Labour hold		Swing		

=== Bamber Bridge West ===
Bamber Bridge West
Party	Candidate	Votes	%	±%
Labour	Paul Foster	507	63.2	
Labour	Caleb Tomlinson	440	54.9	
Conservative	Sheila Baxendale	283	35.3	
Conservative	Paul Moon	272	33.9	
Majority				
Turnout		802	26.2	
Labour hold		Swing		
Labour hold		Swing		

=== Broadfield ===
Broadfield
Party	Candidate	Votes	%	±%
Labour Co-op	Mick Titherington	824	77.5	
Labour Co-op	Matthew Tomlinson	798	75.1	
Conservative	Jan Hamann	180	16.9	
Conservative	Phil Hamann	174	16.4	
Majority				
Turnout		1,063	28.7	
Labour Co-op hold		Swing		
Labour Co-op hold		Swing		

=== Broad Oak ===
Broad Oak
Party	Candidate	Votes	%	±%
Liberal Democrats	Harry Hancock	1,008	66.8	
Liberal Democrats	Ange Turner	909	60.2	
Conservative	Alistair Woollard	362	24.0	
Conservative	Linda Woollard	359	23.8	
Labour	Manson Osbourne	233	15.4	
Majority				
Turnout		1,510	42.9	
Liberal Democrats hold		Swing		
Liberal Democrats gain from Conservative		Swing		

=== Buckshaw & Worden ===
Buckshaw & Worden
Party	Candidate	Votes	%	±%
Conservative	Caroline Moon	828	64.0	
Conservative	Alan Ogilvie	793	61.3	
Labour	Ruth Wynn	438	33.8	
Labour	Dave Wynn	419	32.4	
Majority				
Turnout		1,294	34.6	
Conservative hold		Swing		
Conservative hold		Swing		

=== Charnock ===
Charnock
Party	Candidate	Votes	%	±%
Labour	Ian Watkinson	514	47.9	
Labour	Carol Wooldridge	499	46.5	
Conservative	Joan Burrows	455	42.4	
Conservative	George Ashcroft	432	40.3	
Liberal Democrats	Helen Crewe	106	9.9	
Majority				
Turnout		1,072	36.7	
Labour hold		Swing		
Labour hold		Swing		

=== Coupe Green & Gregson Lane ===
Coupe Green & Gregson Lane
Party	Candidate	Votes	%	±%
Conservative	Jim Marsh	710	51.6	
Conservative	Sarah Whitaker	679	49.3	
Labour	James Gleeson	455	33.1	
Labour	Richard Burton	405	29.4	
UKIP	Alastair Richardson	257	18.7	
Majority				
Turnout		1,376	40.1	
Conservative hold		Swing		
Conservative hold		Swing		

=== Earnshaw Bridge ===
Earnshaw Bridge
Party	Candidate	Votes	%	±%
Labour	Bill Evans	488	43.2	
Labour	Colin Sharples	466	41.3	
Conservative	Susan Snape	452	40.0	
Conservative	Andrew Ashton	445	39.4	
Liberal Democrats	Carol Stunell	157	13.9	
Liberal Democrats	Alastair Thomas	131	11.6	
Majority				
Turnout		1,129	32.4	
Labour hold		Swing		
Labour gain from Conservative		Swing		

=== Farington East ===
Farington East
Party	Candidate	Votes	%	±%
Conservative	Paul Wharton	511	52.1	
Labour	Jacky Alty	362	36.9	
Conservative	David Moore	353	36.0	
Labour	Kath Unsworth	340	34.7	
Liberal Democrats	Katherine Hesketh-Holt	153	15.6	
Liberal Democrats	Alexander Howarth	68	6.9	
Majority				
Turnout		980	30.5	
Conservative hold		Swing		
Labour hold		Swing		

=== Farington West (delayed) ===
Farington West
Party	Candidate	Votes	%	±%
Conservative	Karen Walton	536	59.8	
Conservative	Stephen Thurlbourn	497		
Labour	Emma Buchanan	246	27.5	
Labour	Ryan Hamilton	171		
Liberal Democrats	Judith Davidson	114	12.7	
Liberal Democrats	Alison Hesketh-Holt	91		
Majority				
Turnout				
Conservative hold		Swing		
Conservative hold		Swing		

=== Hoole ===
Hoole
Party	Candidate	Votes	%	±%
Conservative	David Suthers	712	62.6	
Conservative	John Rainsbury	627	55.1	
Labour	Mike Webster	302	26.5	
Liberal Democrats	Timothy Young	144	12.7	
Majority				
Turnout		1,138	34.1	
Conservative hold		Swing		
Conservative hold		Swing		

=== Howick & Priory ===
Howick & Priory
Party	Candidate	Votes	%	±%
Liberal Democrats	David Howarth	1,427	60.3	
Liberal Democrats	David Shaw	1,202	50.8	
Liberal Democrats	Renee Blow	1,090	46.1	
Independent	David Bird	563	23.8	
Conservative	Mary Heaton	529	22.4	
Conservative	Rebecca Noblet	493	20.8	
Conservative	Julie Buttery	458	19.4	
Labour	David Bennett	415	17.5	
UKIP	John Carruthers	189	8.0	
Majority				
Turnout		2,365	43.1	
Liberal Democrats hold		Swing		
Liberal Democrats gain from Conservative		Swing		
Liberal Democrats gain from Conservative		Swing		

=== Leyland Central ===
Leyland Central
Party	Candidate	Votes	%	±%
Labour	Aniela Bylinski Gelder	601	49.3	
Labour	Derek Forrest	571	46.8	
Conservative	Tony Green	451	37.0	
Conservative	Robert Newsome	427	35.0	
Liberal Democrats	Tracie Booth	147	12.1	
Liberal Democrats	John Booth	128	10.5	
Majority				
Turnout		1,219	34.4	
Labour hold		Swing		
Labour hold		Swing		

=== Longton & Hutton West ===
Longton & Hutton West
Party	Candidate	Votes	%	±%
Conservative	Colin Coulton	1,048	56.1	
Conservative	Colin Clark	1,026	55.0	
Conservative	Jon Hesketh	1,002	53.7	
Labour	Geoff Key	357	19.1	
Liberal Democrats	David Moore	329	17.6	
Liberal Democrats	Christopher Maloney	295	15.8	
UKIP	Pat Taylor	253	13.6	
UKIP	Walt Taylor	229	12.3	
Majority				
Turnout		1,867	40.5	
Conservative hold		Swing		
Conservative hold		Swing		
Conservative hold		Swing		

=== Lostock Hall ===
Lostock Hall
Party	Candidate	Votes	%	±%
Conservative	Joseph Hughes	796	45.7	
Conservative	Jacqui Mort	785	45.1	
Labour	Matthew Trafford	737	42.3	
Conservative	Jeff Couperthwaite	719	41.3	
Labour	Des Graham	690	39.6	
Labour	Ann Rochester	682	39.2	
Liberal Democrats	Helen Banks	180	10.3	
Liberal Democrats	Peter Hubberstey	159	9.1	
Liberal Democrats	James Banks	147	8.4	
Majority				
Turnout		1,742	34.0	
Conservative hold		Swing		
Conservative hold		Swing		
Labour gain from Conservative		Swing		

=== Middleforth ===
Middleforth
Party	Candidate	Votes	%	±%
Labour	Keith Martin	869	49.3	
Labour	William Adams	824	46.7	
Labour	James Flannery	807	45.7	
Conservative	Paul Morris	673	38.2	
Conservative	Anita Dunbar	666	37.8	
Conservative	Frances Walker	645	36.6	
Liberal Democrats	Marion Hancock	286	16.2	
Majority				
Turnout		1,764	32.4	
Labour hold		Swing		
Labour hold		Swing		
Labour hold		Swing		

=== Moss Side ===
Moss Side
Party	Candidate	Votes	%	±%
Conservative	Michael Green	554	44.0	
Conservative	Mary Green	537	42.7	
Labour	Lucienne Jackson	333	26.5	
Liberal Democrats	Simon Thomson	255	20.3	
Liberal Democrats	Paul Valentine	208	16.5	
UKIP	Joan Wright	163	13.0	
Majority				
Turnout		1,258	40.8	
Conservative hold		Swing		
Conservative hold		Swing		

=== New Longton & Hutton East ===
New Longton & Hutton East
Party	Candidate	Votes	%	±%
Conservative	Margaret Smith	972	63.9	
Conservative	Phil Smith	933	61.3	
Labour	Joe Giblin	375	24.6	
Liberal Democrats	Mary Young	262	17.2	
Liberal Democrats	Martin Cassell	215	14.1	
Majority				
Turnout		1,522	40.7	
Conservative hold		Swing		
Conservative hold		Swing		

=== Samlesbury & Walton ===
Samlesbury & Walton
Party	Candidate	Votes	%	±%
Conservative	Barrie Yates	657	67.3	
Conservative	Peter Mullineaux	588		
Labour	Michael Darlington	319	32.7	
Majority				
Turnout				
Conservative hold		Swing		
Conservative hold		Swing		

=== Seven Stars ===
Seven Stars
Party	Candidate	Votes	%	±%
Labour	Jane Bell	573	60.7	
Labour	Malcolm Donoghue	484	51.3	
Conservative	Steve Booth	374	39.6	
Conservative	Stephen Thurlbourn	319	33.8	
Majority				
Turnout		944	30.3	
Labour hold		Swing		
Labour hold		Swing		

=== St. Ambrose ===
St. Ambrose
Party	Candidate	Votes	%	±%
Labour	Susan Jones	649	64.3	
Labour	Kenneth Jones	596	59.1	
Conservative	Peter Aspinall	232	23.0	
Conservative	Simon Casey	187	18.5	
Liberal Democrats	James Pattison	180	17.8	
Majority				
Turnout		1,009	31.2	
Labour hold		Swing		
Labour hold		Swing		

=== Walton-le-Dale East ===
Walton-le-Dale East
Party	Candidate	Votes	%	±%
Conservative	Carol Chisholm	570	50.2	
Labour	Christopher Lomax	550	48.4	
Conservative	Gareth Watson	537	47.3	
Labour	Haydn Williams	507	44.6	
Majority				
Turnout		1,136	33.1	
Conservative hold		Swing		
Labour gain from Conservative		Swing		

=== Walton-le-Dale West ===
Walton-le-Dale West
Party	Candidate	Votes	%	±%
Conservative	Damian Bretherton	613	49.9	
Conservative	Matthew Campbell	493	40.1	
Labour	Alex Watson	363	29.5	
Independent	Mike Nelson	342	27.8	
Majority				
Turnout		1,229	37.1	
Conservative hold		Swing		
Conservative hold		Swing		

== By-elections ==
=== Bamber Bridge East ===
Bamber Bridge East: 18 November 2021
Party	Candidate	Votes	%	±%
Labour	Patricia Hunter	376	53.7	+7.2
Conservative	Mathew Forshaw	275	39.3	+9.5
Green	Rachel Knowles	49	7.0	New
Majority		101	14.4	
Turnout		700		
Labour hold		Swing	▼1.2	
