= 2019 Watford Borough Council election =

2019 UK local government election

Map of the results

The 2019 Watford Borough Council election took place on 2 May 2019 to elect members of Watford Borough Council in England. This was the same day as other local elections.

== Summary ==
=== Result ===
2019 Watford Borough Council election
| Party | This election | | | Full council | | | This election | | |
| Party | Seats | Net | Seats % | Other | Total | Total % | Votes | Votes % | +/− |
|---|---|---|---|---|---|---|---|---|---|
| Liberal Democrats | 9 | Steady | 75.0 | 17 | 26 | 72.2 | 13,594 | 55.2 | ▲11.6 |
| Labour | 3 | Steady | 25.0 | 7 | 10 | 27.8 | 7,151 | 29.0 | ▼4.7 |
| Conservative | 0 | Steady | 0.0 | 0 | 0 | 0.0 | 3,581 | 14.5 | ▼6.4 |

== Ward results ==
=== Callowland ===
Callowland
| Party | Candidate | Votes | % | ±% |
|---|---|---|---|---|
| Liberal Democrats | Dawn Allen-Williamson | 1,068 | 53.4 | ▲7.8 |
| Labour | Asma Suleman | 750 | 37.5 | ▲1.1 |
| Conservative | Mary Sackett | 181 | 9.1 | ▼3.0 |
| Majority | | 318 | 15.9 | |
| Turnout | | | 35.90 | |
| Liberal Democrats hold | | Swing | | |

=== Central ===
Central
| Party | Candidate | Votes | % | ±% |
|---|---|---|---|---|
| Liberal Democrats | Rabi Martins* | 1,158 | 54.0 | ▲13.3 |
| Labour | Emma Kosmin | 794 | 37.0 | ▼3.0 |
| Conservative | Dennis Wharton | 194 | 9.0 | ▼4.1 |
| Majority | | 364 | 17.0 | |
| Turnout | | | 34.23 | |
| Liberal Democrats hold | | Swing | | |

=== Holywell ===
Holywell
| Party | Candidate | Votes | % | ±% |
|---|---|---|---|---|
| Labour | Favour Ezeifedi | 969 | 59.4 | ▼6.2 |
| Liberal Democrats | Simonie Jefree | 471 | 28.9 | ▲8.5 |
| Conservative | Jussie Kaur | 192 | 11.8 | ▼2.2 |
| Majority | | 498 | 30.5 | |
| Turnout | | | 25.59 | |
| Labour hold | | Swing | | |

=== Leggatts ===
Leggatts
| Party | Candidate | Votes | % | ±% |
|---|---|---|---|---|
| Labour | Asif Khan* | 856 | 43.6 | ▼7.0 |
| Liberal Democrats | Jamil Minhas | 614 | 31.2 | ▼1.3 |
| Conservative | Anthony Parker | 495 | 25.2 | ▲8.3 |
| Majority | | 242 | 12.4 | |
| Turnout | | | 34.60 | |
| Labour hold | | Swing | | |

=== Meriden ===
Meriden
| Party | Candidate | Votes | % | ±% |
|---|---|---|---|---|
| Liberal Democrats | Amanda Grimston* | 960 | 59.6 | ▲16.0 |
| Liberal Democrats | Jennifer Pattinson | 871 | 54.1 | ▲10.5 |
| Labour | Carla Curtis-Tansley | 385 | 23.9 | ▼7.4 |
| Labour | John Dowdle | 374 | 23.2 | ▼8.1 |
| Conservative | Binita Mehta | 219 | 13.6 | ▼11.5 |
| Conservative | Peter Okojie | 198 | 12.3 | ▼8.7 |
| Majority | | 364 | 36.8 | |
| Turnout | | 1,610 | 28.40 | |
| Liberal Democrats hold | | Swing | | |
| Liberal Democrats hold | | Swing | | |

=== Nascot ===
Nascot
| Party | Candidate | Votes | % | ±% |
|---|---|---|---|---|
| Liberal Democrats | Mark Hofman* | 1,611 | 64.5 | ▲11.1 |
| Conservative | Linda Topping | 552 | 22.1 | ▼3.6 |
| Labour | Edward Tunnah | 335 | 13.4 | ▼4.7 |
| Majority | | 1,059 | 42.4 | |
| Turnout | | | 38.17 | |
| Liberal Democrats hold | | Swing | | |

=== Oxhey ===
Oxhey
| Party | Candidate | Votes | % | ±% |
|---|---|---|---|---|
| Liberal Democrats | Imran Hamid | 1,313 | 68.5 | ▲9.7 |
| Labour | Sue Sleeman | 327 | 17.0 | ▼0.7 |
| Conservative | Joseph Gornicki | 278 | 14.5 | ▼8.9 |
| Majority | | 986 | 51.5 | |
| Turnout | | | 37.04 | |
| Liberal Democrats hold | | Swing | | |

=== Park ===
Park
| Party | Candidate | Votes | % | ±% |
|---|---|---|---|---|
| Liberal Democrats | Jessica Stiff | 1,587 | 62.4 | ▲10.6 |
| Conservative | David Fallon | 513 | 20.2 | ▼8.8 |
| Labour | Dennis Watling | 323 | 12.7 | ▼4.9 |
| UKIP | Peter Blogg | 122 | 4.8 | ▲3.2 |
| Majority | | 1,074 | 42.2 | |
| Turnout | | | 40.71 | |
| Liberal Democrats hold | | Swing | | |

=== Stanborough ===
Stanborough
| Party | Candidate | Votes | % | ±% |
|---|---|---|---|---|
| Liberal Democrats | Tim Williams* | 1,376 | 83.2 | ▲20.4 |
| Labour | Omar Ismail | 277 | 16.8 | ▼2.7 |
| Majority | | 1,099 | 66.4 | |
| Turnout | | | 30.28 | |
| Liberal Democrats hold | | Swing | | |

=== Tudor ===
Tudor
| Party | Candidate | Votes | % | ±% |
|---|---|---|---|---|
| Liberal Democrats | Joe Fahmy* | 1,031 | 61.0 | ▲16.4 |
| Labour | Diana Ivory | 354 | 20.9 | ▼8.0 |
| Conservative | Philip Cox | 305 | 18.0 | ▼8.5 |
| Majority | | 677 | 40.1 | |
| Turnout | | | 32.84 | |
| Liberal Democrats hold | | Swing | | |

=== Vicarage ===
Vicarage
| Party | Candidate | Votes | % | ±% |
|---|---|---|---|---|
| Labour | Jagtar Singh Dhindsa* | 1,101 | 57.6 | ▼4.5 |
| Liberal Democrats | Ilmas Isard | 576 | 30.1 | ▲9.0 |
| Conservative | Michelle Sherman | 236 | 12.3 | ▼4.5 |
| Majority | | 525 | 27.5 | |
| Turnout | | | 34.27 | |
| Labour hold | | Swing | | |

=== Woodside ===
Woodside
| Party | Candidate | Votes | % | ±% |
|---|---|---|---|---|
| Liberal Democrats | Richard Wenham | 958 | 57.3 | ▲14.0 |
| Labour | Seamus Williams | 306 | 18.3 | ▼7.0 |
| Conservative | Victoria Lynch | 218 | 13.0 | ▼13.4 |
| UKIP | Ian Green | 190 | 11.4 | ▲6.3 |
| Majority | | 652 | 39.0 | |
| Turnout | | | 29.04 | |
| Liberal Democrats hold | | Swing | | |
