= 2019 South Tyneside Metropolitan Borough Council election =

Map of results

The 2019 South Tyneside Council election took place on 2 May 2019 in concert with other local elections. Its purpose was to elect members of the South Tyneside Council in Tyne and Wear, North East England.

== Ward results ==
=== Beacon & Bents ===
Beacon & Bents
Party	Candidate	Votes	%	±%
Green	David Francis	1,867	67.1	+28.0
Labour	Audrey McMillan	795	28.6	−21.7
Conservative	Ali Hayder	121	4.3	−6.3
Majority				
Turnout				
Green gain from Labour		Swing		

=== Bede ===
Bede
Party	Candidate	Votes	%	±%
Independent	Keith Roberts	1,170	61.8	+28.3
Labour	Fay Cunningham	629	33.2	−19.9
Conservative	Mary Golightly	94	5.0	−3.8
Majority				
Turnout				
Independent gain from Labour		Swing		

=== Biddick & All Saints ===
Biddick & All Saints
Party	Candidate	Votes	%	±%
Labour	Joe Amar	721	46.2	−23.0
UKIP	Neil Nickman	484	31.0	New
Green	Rhiannon Curtis	271	17.4	+2.2
Conservative	Stewart Hay	83	5.3	−9.9
Majority				
Turnout				
Labour hold		Swing		

=== Boldon Colliery ===
Bolden Colliery
Party	Candidate	Votes	%	±%
Labour	Sandra Duncan	937	42.5	−21.8
Independent	Ian Diamond	601	27.2	New
Conservative	Ian Armstrong	309	14.0	−10.6
Green	Colin Tosh	238	10.8	−0.3
Liberal Democrats	Bevan de Villiers	122	5.5	New
Majority				
Turnout				
Labour hold		Swing		

=== Cleadon & East Boldon ===
Cleadon & East Boldon
Party	Candidate	Votes	%	±%
Labour	Joan Atkinson	1,507	47.3	+6.9
Labour	Jane Carter	1,076	33.8	−6.6
Conservative	Donald Wood	839	26.4	−22.2
Conservative	Christopher Smith	594	18.7	−29.9
Independent	Fiona Milburn	386	12.1	New
Green	Sarah McKeown	363	11.4	+0.3
Independent	Ian Foster	359	11.3	New
Green	David Herbert	354	11.1	±0.0
Independent	Colin Campbell	284	8.9	New
Independent	Dave Henderson	152	4.8	New
Liberal Democrats	Doriza Wetz	117	3.7	New
Majority				
Turnout		3,183	46.4	
Labour hold		Swing		
Labour hold		Swing		

=== Cleadon Park ===
Cleadon Park
Party	Candidate	Votes	%	±%
Labour	Susan Traynor	714	43.9	−8.9
Green	Stephen Peel	499	30.7	+19.0
Conservative	Sam Prior	412	25.4	−10.2
Majority				
Turnout				
Labour hold		Swing		

=== Fellgate & Hedworth ===
Fellgate & Hedworth
Party	Candidate	Votes	%	±%
Independent	John Robertson	1,163	47.9	+28.3
Labour	Audrey Huntley	959	39.5	−18.6
Liberal Democrats	David Wilkinson	199	8.2	−5.6
Conservative	Joseph Todd	108	4.4	−1.6
Majority				
Turnout				
Independent gain from Labour		Swing		

=== Harton ===
Harton
Party	Candidate	Votes	%	±%
Labour	Rob Dix	1,014	46.2	−5.9
UKIP	Oliver Wallhead	719	32.8	New
Conservative	Holly Wright	462	21.0	−14.5
Majority				
Turnout				
Labour hold		Swing		

=== Hebburn North ===
Hebburn North
Party	Candidate	Votes	%	±%
Labour	Adam Ellison	1,079	51.5	−21.4
UKIP	John Barker	310	14.8	New
Independent	Brian Goodman	180	8.6	New
Independent	Michael Ayre	173	8.3	New
Green	Steve Richards	148	7.1	−6.1
Conservative	Keith Sumby	120	5.7	−8.2
Liberal Democrats	Sid Andrade	84	4.0	New
Majority				
Turnout				
Labour hold		Swing		

=== Hebburn South ===
Hebburn South
Party	Candidate	Votes	%	±%
Labour	Wilf Flynn	1,080	51.5	−17.5
Green	Matthew Giles	553	26.4	+12.1
Conservative	Margaret Snowling	269	12.8	−4.0
Liberal Democrats	Stephen Wilkinson	195	9.3	New
Majority				
Turnout				
Labour hold		Swing		

=== Horsley Hill ===
Horsley Hill
Party	Candidate	Votes	%	±%
Labour	Iain Malcolm	1,077	41.3	−14.4
UKIP	David Scholey	516	19.8	New
Green	Sue Stonehouse	445	17.1	+7.2
Conservative	Mark Auton	318	12.2	−12.1
Independent	Colin Lemon	251	9.6	New
Majority				
Turnout				
Labour hold		Swing		

=== Monkton ===
Monkton
Party	Candidate	Votes	%	±%
Labour	Alan Kerr	862	42.0	−26.2
Independent	Marian Stead	643	31.4	New
Green	Matthew McKenna	236	11.5	−2.4
Conservative	Vanessa Green	160	7.8	−10.0
Liberal Democrats	Aidan Smith	150	7.3	New
Majority				
Turnout				
Labour hold		Swing		

=== Primrose ===
Primrose
Party	Candidate	Votes	%	±%
Independent	Paul Milburn	759	41.1	New
Labour	Paul Dean	667	36.2	−30.7
Green	Lesley Hanson	158	8.6	−5.1
Liberal Democrats	Lynn Smith	132	7.2	New
Conservative	Walter Armstrong	129	7.0	−12.4
Majority				
Turnout				
Independent gain from Labour		Swing		

=== Simonside & Rekendyke ===
Simonside & Rekendyke
Party	Candidate	Votes	%	±%
Labour	Judith Taylor	947	54.8	−13.3
Green	Peter Bristow	510	29.5	+15.8
Conservative	Cameron White	272	15.7	−2.5
Majority				
Turnout				
Labour hold		Swing		

=== West Park ===
West Park
Party	Candidate	Votes	%	±%
Labour	Anne Hetherington	673	40.5	−4.5
Green	Thomas Mower	630	37.9	+28.4
Conservative	Margaret Robson	358	21.6	−2.4
Majority				
Turnout				
Labour hold		Swing		

=== Westoe ===
Westoe
Party	Candidate	Votes	%	±%
Independent	Glenn Thompson	712	32.0	New
Labour	Katharine Maxwell	635	28.5	−13.7
UKIP	Paul Linney	307	13.8	New
Conservative	Jack White	237	10.6	−18.7
Green	Nicola Usher	222	10.0	−1.7
Liberal Democrats	Elizabeth Grey	115	5.2	−11.7
Majority				
Turnout				
Independent gain from Labour		Swing		

=== Whitburn & Marsden ===
Whitburn & Marsden
Party	Candidate	Votes	%	±%
Labour	Joyce Welsh	765	37.9	−12.8
UKIP	Charles McKenzie-Smith	495	24.5	New
Green	Trevor Sewell	413	20.4	+5.6
Conservative	Adam Stewart	348	17.2	−13.8
Majority				
Turnout				
Labour hold		Swing		

=== Whiteleas ===
Whiteleas
Party	Candidate	Votes	%	±%
Labour	Ernest Gibson	970	55.0	−13.1
Green	Malcolm Giles	592	33.6	+18.8
Conservative	Craig Slater	202	11.5	−5.5
Majority				
Turnout				
Labour hold		Swing		
