= 2019 Broxbourne Borough Council election =

2019 UK local government election

The 2019 Broxbourne Borough Council election took place on 2 May 2019 to elect members of the Broxbourne Borough Council in England. This was on the same day as other local elections.

== Results summary ==
2019 Broxbourne Borough Council election
Party	This election			Full council			This election		
Party	Seats	Net	Seats %	Other	Total	Total %	Votes	Votes %	+/−
Conservative	10	Steady	90.9	17	27	90.0	10,875	57.5	-2.0
Labour	1	Steady	9.1	2	3	10.0	4,427	23.4	-5.1
Liberal Democrats	0	Steady	0.0	0	0	0.0	3,344	17.7	+8.8
BNP	0	Steady	0.0	0	0	0.0	272	1.4	N/A

== Ward results ==
=== Broxbourne & Hoddesdon South ===
Broxbourne & Hoddesdon South (2 seats due to by-election)
Party	Candidate	Votes	%	±%
Conservative	Paul Mason	1,445	68.1	−4.4
Conservative	Sherrie McDaid	1,276	60.2	−12.3
Liberal Democrats	Kirstie de Rivaz	407	19.2	+11.2
Labour	Kathy Condon	339	16.0	+2.5
Liberal Democrats	Lukasz Gryzbon	287	13.5	+5.5
Labour	Jean Legg	264	12.4	−1.1
Majority				
Turnout				
Conservative hold		Swing		
Conservative hold		Swing		

=== Cheshunt North ===
Cheshunt North
Party	Candidate	Votes	%	±%
Conservative	Penny Soteris	876	53.8	−5.4
Liberal Democrats	Kostas Inchenko	409	25.1	+16.4
Labour	Tony Renwick	344	21.1	−11.0
Majority				
Turnout				
Conservative hold		Swing		

=== Cheshunt South & Theobalds ===
Cheshunt South & Theobalds
Party	Candidate	Votes	%	±%
Conservative	Tony Siracusa	811	45.9	−13.5
Labour	Steve Basing	514	29.1	−3.4
BNP	Ian Seeby	272	15.4	N/A
Liberal Democrats	Deb Highfield	169	9.6	+1.5
Majority				
Turnout				
Conservative hold		Swing		

=== Flamstead End ===
Flamstead End
Party	Candidate	Votes	%	±%
Conservative	Paul Seeby	1,017	68.0	−1.4
Labour	Sam Fasipe	323	21.6	−3.0
Liberal Democrats	Kypros Savopoulos	155	10.4	+5.7
Majority				
Turnout				
Conservative hold		Swing		

=== Goffs Oak ===
Goffs Oak
Party	Candidate	Votes	%	±%
Conservative	Peter Moule	999	53.4	−10.3
Liberal Democrats	David Payne	668	35.7	+17.5
Labour	Sean Waters	203	10.9	−2.2
Majority				
Turnout				
Conservative hold		Swing		

=== Hoddesdon North ===
Hoddesdon North
Party	Candidate	Votes	%	±%
Conservative	Steve Wortley	1,215	66.5	+3.1
Labour	Janet Wareham	313	17.1	−3.4
Liberal Democrats	Ruth Everness	300	16.4	+8.7
Majority				
Turnout				
Conservative hold		Swing		

=== Hoddesdon Town & Rye Park ===
Hoddesdon Town & Rye Park
Party	Candidate	Votes	%	±%
Conservative	Aran Banks	779	54.1	+1.4
Labour	Caroline Day	443	30.8	+0.1
Liberal Democrats	Luca Perotti	217	15.1	+8.7
Majority				
Turnout				
Conservative hold		Swing		

=== Rosedale & Bury Green ===
Rosedale & Bury Green
Party	Candidate	Votes	%	±%
Conservative	Martin Greensmyth	878	60.9	−2.8
Labour	Roy Wareham	342	23.7	−12.6
Liberal Democrats	Bradley Davis	221	15.3	N/A
Majority				
Turnout				
Conservative hold		Swing		

=== Waltham Cross ===
Waltham Cross
Party	Candidate	Votes	%	±%
Labour	Selina Norgrove	942	52.2	−1.4
Conservative	Pierce Connolly	602	33.4	+1.5
Liberal Democrats	Fabio Bonfante	260	14.4	−0.1
Majority				
Turnout				
Labour hold		Swing		

=== Wormley & Turnford ===
Wormley & Turnford
Party	Candidate	Votes	%	±%
Conservative	Nick Nicholson	977	60.0	−2.3
Labour	Diana Defries	400	24.6	−4.5
Liberal Democrats	Lisa Naylor	251	15.4	+6.7
Majority				
Turnout				
Conservative hold		Swing		
