= 2019 Rugby Borough Council election =

2019 UK local government election

Map of the results

The 2019 Rugby Borough Council election took place on 2 May 2019 to elect members of Rugby Borough Council in England. This was on the same day as other local elections.

== Results summary ==
2019 Rugby Borough Council election
Party	This election			Full council			This election		
Party	Seats	Net	Seats %	Other	Total	Total %	Votes	Votes %	+/−
Conservative	8	Steady	57.1	15	23	54.8	9,922	41.3	-5.6
Labour	3	Steady	21.4	6	9	21.4	6,342	26.4	-6.2
Liberal Democrats	3	Steady	21.4	6	9	21.4	5,472	22.8	+6.1
Independent	0	Steady	0.0	1	1	2.4	–	–	–
Green	0	Steady	0.0	0	0	0.0	1,577	6.6	+2.0
UKIP	0	Steady	0.0	0	0	0.0	729	3.0	New

== Ward results ==
=== Admirals & Cawston ===
Admirals & Cawston
Party	Candidate	Votes	%	±%
Conservative	Michael Stokes	898	47.1	
Labour	Sharon Goldingay	606	31.8	
Liberal Democrats	Lee Chase	401	21.0	
Majority				
Turnout				
Conservative hold		Swing		

=== Benn ===
Benn
Party	Candidate	Votes	%	±%
Labour	Tom Mahoney	703	46.9	
Conservative	Rachel Lowe	268	17.9	
Green	Rebecca Stevenson	222	14.8	
Liberal Democrats	Hugh Trimble	172	11.5	
UKIP	Enid Niven	133	8.9	
Majority				
Turnout				
Labour hold		Swing		

=== Bilton ===
Bilton
Party	Candidate	Votes	%	±%
Conservative	Lisa Parker	1,018	53.3	
Labour	Phil Hemsley	474	24.8	
Liberal Democrats	Lesley George	418	21.9	
Majority				
Turnout				
Conservative hold		Swing		

=== Coton & Boughton ===
Coton & Boughton
Party	Candidate	Votes	%	±%
Conservative	Seb Lowe	679	40.3	
Labour	Mark Gore	503	29.9	
UKIP	Peter Bramble	204	12.1	
Liberal Democrats	James Moran	158	9.4	
Green	Maralyn Pickup	139	8.3	
Majority				
Turnout				
Conservative hold		Swing		

=== Dunsmore ===
Dunsmore
Party	Candidate	Votes	%	±%
Conservative	Peter Eccleson	1,374	63.3	
Liberal Democrats	Louise Bennett	477	22.0	
Labour	Peter McLaverty	321	14.8	
Majority				
Turnout				
Conservative hold		Swing		

=== Eastlands ===
Eastlands
Party	Candidate	Votes	%	±%
Liberal Democrats	Neil Sandison	910	47.6	
Labour	Ben Law	385	20.2	
Conservative	Carolyn Watson-Merret	306	16.0	
UKIP	Roy Harvey	190	9.9	
Green	Patrick Steel	119	6.2	
Majority				
Turnout				
Liberal Democrats hold		Swing		

=== Hillmorton ===
Hillmorton
Party	Candidate	Votes	%	±%
Conservative	Kathryn Lawrence	800	50.4	
Labour	Sarah Feeney	450	28.4	
Liberal Democrats	Julie Douglas	181	11.4	
Green	Peter Reynolds	156	9.8	
Majority				
Turnout				
Conservative hold		Swing		

=== Leam Valley ===
Leam Valley
Party	Candidate	Votes	%	±%
Conservative	Emma Crane	704	81.2	
Labour	Bob Hughes	163	18.8	
Majority				
Turnout				
Conservative hold		Swing		

=== New Bilton ===
New Bilton
Party	Candidate	Votes	%	±%
Labour	Barbara Brown	571	42.2	
Conservative	Eve Hassell	322	23.8	
UKIP	David Barker	202	14.9	
Green	Robert Beggs	134	9.9	
Liberal Democrats	Keith Ward	123	9.1	
Majority				
Turnout				
Labour hold		Swing		

=== Newbold & Brownsover ===
Newbold & Brownsover
Party	Candidate	Votes	%	±%
Labour	Jim Ellis	609	42.2	
Conservative	Richard Tomlin	511	35.4	
Green	Mark Summers	233	16.1	
Liberal Democrats	Hossain Tafazzal	90	6.2	
Majority				
Turnout				
Labour hold		Swing		

=== Paddox ===
Paddox
Party	Candidate	Votes	%	±%
Liberal Democrats	Jerry Roodhouse	1,266	57.7	
Conservative	Adam Daley	440	20.0	
Labour	Jonathan Vickers	340	15.5	
Green	Roy Sandison	149	6.8	
Majority				
Turnout				
Liberal Democrats hold		Swing		

=== Revel & Binley Woods ===
Revel & Binley Woods
Party	Candidate	Votes	%	±%
Conservative	Heather Timms	1,270	73.4	
Labour	Richard Harrington	463	26.6	
Majority				
Turnout				
Conservative hold		Swing		

=== Rokeby & Overslade ===
Rokeby & Overslade
Party	Candidate	Votes	%	±%
Liberal Democrats	Nick Long	1,276	63.2	
Labour	Beck Hemsley	373	18.5	
Conservative	Christopher Johnson	371	18.4	
Majority				
Turnout				
Liberal Democrats hold		Swing		

=== Wolston & The Lawfords ===
Wolston & The Lawfords
Party	Candidate	Votes	%	±%
Conservative	Derek Poole	961	54.4	
Green	Lesley Summers	425	24.1	
Labour	Graham Bliss	381	21.6	
Majority				
Turnout				
Conservative hold		Swing		
