= 2019 Sedgemoor District Council election =

2019 UK local government election

Map of the results of the 2019 Sedgemoor District Council election.

The 2019 Sedgemoor District Council election took place on Thursday 2 May 2019 as a four-yearly election to elect all members (councillors) of Sedgemoor District Council in the English county of Somerset. The principal town in the district was Bridgwater accounting for 15 of the 48 councillors elected. The election was part of the United Kingdom local elections, 2019. Following the election, Sedgemoor District Council became the only district council in Somerset still under Conservative control.

== Results summary ==
Sedgemoor District Council election, 2019
Party	Seats	Gains	Losses	Net gain/loss	Seats %	Votes %	Votes	+/−
Conservative	28	0	7	-7		47.2	24,308	-6.4
Labour	12	2	0	+2		19.1	9,816	+3.1
Liberal Democrats	7	6	0	+6		30.0	15,446	+12.9
Independent	1	1	0	+1		2.7	1,385	+1.0
Green	0	0	0	0		0.7	357	-5.0

== Ward results ==
- seeking re-election

=== Axevale ===
Axevale (2 seats)
Party	Candidate	Votes	%	±%
Conservative	Liz Scott*	581	46.9	
Conservative	Graham Godwin-Pearson	513	41.4	
Liberal Democrats	Rosemary Hasler	360	29.0	
Green	Stewart Conning	357	28.8	
Liberal Democrats	Ann Wardman	287	23.1	
Labour	Julia Timothy	158	12.7	
Turnout		1,240	45.0	
Conservative hold		Swing		
Conservative hold		Swing		

=== Berrow ===
Berrow (1 seat)
Party	Candidate	Votes	%	±%
Conservative	Tony Grimes*	349	66.2	▲1.9
Liberal Democrats	Richard Baum	126	23.9	▼11.8
Labour	Amit Shah	52	10.9	N/A
Turnout		527	46.2	
Conservative hold		Swing		

=== Bridgwater Dunwear ===
Bridgwater Dunwear (2 seats)
Party	Candidate	Votes	%	±%
Labour	Diogo Rodrigues	344	43.2	
Labour	Alexia Bartlett	233	29.2	
Conservative	Suria Aujla	222	27.9	
Conservative	Pele Barnes	199	25.0	
UKIP	Richard Scammell	189	23.7	
Liberal Democrats	Lorna King	89	11.2	
Turnout		797	25.2	
Labour hold		Swing		
Labour gain from UKIP		Swing		

=== Bridgwater Eastover ===
Bridgwater Eastover (2 seats)
Party	Candidate	Votes	%	±%
Labour	Tony Heywood	371	57.8	
Labour	Li Gibson	359	55.9	
Conservative	Susan Bristowe	168	26.2	
Conservative	Jonathan Fraser-Howells	151	23.5	
Liberal Democrats	Toran Shaw	77	12.0	
Turnout		642	22.1	
Labour hold		Swing		
Labour hold		Swing		

=== Bridgwater Fairfax ===
Bridgwater Fairfax (3 seats)
Party	Candidate	Votes	%	±%
Labour	Graham Granter	483	51.8	
Labour	Alex Glassford	383	41.1	
Labour	Hilary Bruce	355	38.1	
Conservative	Mike Cresswell	312	33.5	
Liberal Democrats	Sarah Baker	243	26.1	
Conservative	Helen Marsh	234	25.1	
Liberal Democrats	Adrian Nickolls	231	24.8	
Turnout		932	20.1	
Labour hold		Swing		
Labour hold		Swing		
Labour gain from Conservative		Swing		

=== Bridgwater Hamp ===
Bridgwater Hamp (2 seats)
Party	Candidate	Votes	%	±%
Labour	Leigh Redman	382	51.7	
Labour	Elizabeth Leavy	305	41.3	
Independent	Adrian Moore	249	33.7	N/A
Independent	Stephen Austen	201	27.2	N/A
Conservative	Paul Mills	107	14.5	
Conservative	David Filmer	104	14.1	
Turnout		739	22.3	
Labour hold		Swing		
Labour hold		Swing		

=== Bridgwater Victoria ===
Bridgwater Victoria (2 seats)
Party	Candidate	Votes	%	±%
Labour	Julie Cordiner	338	47.2	
Conservative	Lance Duddridge	328	45.8	
Labour	Mick Lerry	318	44.4	
Conservative	John Harwood	259	36.2	
Turnout		716	20.6	
Labour hold		Swing		
Conservative hold		Swing		

=== Bridgwater Westover ===
Bridgwater Westover (2 seats)
Party	Candidate	Votes	%	±%
Labour	Kathryn Pearce	466	52.5	
Labour	Brian Smedley	447	50.3	
Conservative	Gareth Lewis	242	27.3	
Conservative	Michael Asher	235	26.5	
Liberal Democrats	Antony Nickolls	168	18.9	
Liberal Democrats	Roland Lee	123	13.9	
Turnout		888	25.7	
Labour hold		Swing		
Labour hold		Swing		

=== Bridgwater Wyndham ===
Bridgwater Wyndham (2 seats)
Party	Candidate	Votes	%	±%
Conservative	Gill Slocombe	694	59.7	
Conservative	Rachael Lilley	602	51.8	
Liberal Democrats	Peter Johnstone	260	22.4	
Liberal Democrats	Dean Waghorn	237	20.4	
Labour	Stuart Ridewood	199	17.1	
Labour	Inika Palaram	196	16.9	
Turnout		1,162	38.5	
Conservative hold		Swing		
Conservative hold		Swing		

=== Burnham Central ===
Burnham Central (3 seats)
Party	Candidate	Votes	%	±%
Liberal Democrats	Phil Harvey	580	38.4	
Conservative	Sue Barber	553	36.6	
Conservative	Alistair Hendry	546	36.1	
Conservative	Edith Rowley	530	35.1	
Liberal Democrats	Alasdair Elrick	499	33.0	
Liberal Democrats	Ganesh Gudka	491	32.5	
Independent	Michael Clarke	356	23.6	
Labour	Corey Miller	206	13.6	N/A
Turnout		1,511	35.2	
Liberal Democrats gain from Conservative		Swing		
Conservative hold		Swing		
Conservative hold		Swing		

=== Burnham North ===
Burnham North (3 seats)
Party	Candidate	Votes	%	±%
Conservative	Peter Clayton	876	47.8	
Liberal Democrats	Mike Murphy	781	42.7	
Conservative	Mike Facey	762	41.6	
Liberal Democrats	Helen Groves	702	38.3	
Liberal Democrats	Simonds Milner	685	37.4	
Conservative	Cheryl Burnett	672	36.7	
Labour	Andy Ballard	316	17.3	N/A
Turnout		1,831	48.3	
Conservative hold		Swing		
Liberal Democrats gain from Conservative		Swing		
Conservative hold		Swing		

=== Cannington and Wembdon ===
Cannington and Wembdon (2 seats)
Party	Candidate	Votes	%	±%
Conservative	Ian Dyer	898	67.1	
Conservative	Brian Bolt	733	54.7	
Liberal Democrats	Janice Beasley	403	30.1	
Labour	Gemma Shanahan	297	22.2	N/A
Turnout		1,339	43.2	
Conservative hold		Swing		
Conservative hold		Swing		

=== Cheddar and Shipham ===
Cheddar and Shipham (3 seats)
Party	Candidate	Votes	%	±%
Liberal Democrats	Charlie Riches	861	41.5	
Liberal Democrats	Lisa Methley	816	39.3	
Independent	Paul Fineran	728	35.1	N/A
Conservative	Jeff Savage	674	32.5	
Liberal Democrats	Neil Shaban	671	32.3	
Conservative	Dawn Hill	649	31.2	
Conservative	Peter Downing	618	29.8	
Labour	Nick Persaud	311	15.0	
Turnout		2,077	30.0	
Liberal Democrats gain from Conservative		Swing		
Liberal Democrats gain from Conservative		Swing		
Independent gain from Conservative		Swing		

=== East Poldens ===
East Poldens (1 seat)
Party	Candidate	Votes	%	±%
Conservative	Duncan McGinty	288	50.1	▼16.5
Independent	Camael King	207	36.0	N/A
Labour	Stephen Oxbrow	80	13.9	N/A
Turnout		575	42.1	
Conservative hold		Swing		

=== Highbridge and Burnham Marine ===
Highbridge and Burnham Marine (3 seats)
Party	Candidate	Votes	%	±%
Liberal Democrats	Nick Bayliss	457	34.4	
Conservative	Janet Keen	454	34.2	
Conservative	Alan Matthews	384	28.9	
Liberal Democrats	Victoria Weavell	383	28.8	
Liberal Democrats	Dawn Carey	381	28.7	
Independent	Roger Keen	345	26.0	
Conservative	Kathy Jones	322	24.2	
Labour	John Fones	246	18.5	
Labour	Sue Park	246	18.5	
Labour	Joji Mathew	212	16.0	
Turnout		1,328	25.2	
Liberal Democrats gain from UKIP		Swing		
Conservative hold		Swing		
Conservative hold		Swing		

=== Huntspill and Pawlett ===
Huntspill and Pawlett (1 seat)
Party	Candidate	Votes	%	±%
Conservative	John Woodman	359	72.4	▲11.2
Labour	Liam Tucker	137	27.6	N/A
Turnout		496	33.5	
Conservative hold		Swing		

=== Kings Isle ===
Kings Isle (2 seats)
Party	Candidate	Votes	%	±%
Conservative	Anthony Betty	762	56.0	
Conservative	Liz Perry	676	49.7	
Liberal Democrats	Mike Senior	476	35.0	
Labour	Lianne Vessier	392	28.8	N/A
Turnout		1,361	34.1	
Conservative hold		Swing		
Conservative hold		Swing		

=== Knoll ===
Knoll (2 seats)
Party	Candidate	Votes	%	±%
Conservative	Bob Filmer	847	58.0	
Conservative	Andrew Gilling	704	48.2	
Liberal Democrats	Mae Pleydell-Pearce	535	36.6	
Liberal Democrats	Tony Gore	419	28.7	
Labour	Jean Buckler	143	9.8	N/A
Turnout		1,460	42.2	
Conservative hold		Swing		
Conservative hold		Swing		

=== North Petherton ===
North Petherton (3 seats)
Party	Candidate	Votes	%	±%
Liberal Democrats	Bill Revans	1,447	64.3	
Liberal Democrats	Gary Wong	1,064	47.3	
Conservative	Alan Bradford	944	42.0	
Conservative	Sue Hickmet	598	26.6	
Labour	Linda Hyde	572	25.4	
Conservative	Vanda Crow	566	25.2	
Turnout		2,250	37.5	
Liberal Democrats hold		Swing		
Liberal Democrats gain from Conservative		Swing		
Conservative hold		Swing		

=== Puriton and Woolavington ===
Puriton and Woolavington (2 seats)
Party	Candidate	Votes	%	±%
Conservative	Mark Healey	525	48.9	
Conservative	Barrie Crow	462	43.1	
Liberal Democrats	James Ashby	382	35.6	N/A
Labour	Chelsea Chadwick	234	21.8	
Labour	Gary Tucker	196	18.3	
Turnout		1,073	32.6	
Conservative hold		Swing		
Conservative hold		Swing		

=== Quantocks ===
Quantocks (2 seats)
Party	Candidate	Votes	%	±%
Conservative	Julie Pay	790	58.8	
Conservative	Michael Caswell	787	58.6	
Labour	Maggy Layton	495	36.8	
Turnout		1,344	44.6	
Conservative hold		Swing		
Conservative hold		Swing		

=== Wedmore and Mark ===
Wedmore and Mark (2 seats)
Party	Candidate	Votes	%	±%
Conservative	Polly Costello	845	55.2	
Conservative	Will Human	726	47.5	
Liberal Democrats	Jo Keen	649	42.4	
Liberal Democrats	Claire Prior	563	36.8	
Labour	Graham McLelland	117	7.6	
Turnout		1,530	49.6	
Conservative hold		Swing		
Conservative hold		Swing		

=== West Poldens ===
West Poldens (1 seat)
Party	Candidate	Votes	%	±%
Conservative	Stuart Kingham	458	66.9	▲3.0
Labour	Alison Borman	227	33.1	N/A
Turnout		685	42.1	
Conservative hold		Swing		

== Changes 2019–2023 ==
- July 2019: Diogo Rodrigues resigned from the Labour Party and sat as an independent councillor for the Bridgwater Dunwear seat, which he had been elected to in 2019. He joined the Conservative group in March 2020.
- 1 April 2023: Sedgemoor District Council was abolished, and its functions were transferred to Somerset Council, the new unitary authority for the area.
