= 2019 Tewkesbury Borough Council election =

Local election in England

- 2 May 2019

All 38 seats to Tewkesbury Borough Council 20 seats needed for a majority

	First party	Second party	Third party
Party	Conservative	Liberal Democrats	Independent
Last election	33 seats, 54.2%	3 seats, 20.4%	0 seats, 3.1%
Seats won	23	8	4
Seat change	▼10	▲5	▲4
Popular vote	16,533	11,450	3,461
Percentage	41.6%	28.8%	8.7%
Swing	▼12.6%	▲8.4%	▲5.6%
	Fourth party	Fifth party
Party	Tewkesbury Ind.	Green
Last election	2 seats, 3.7%	0 seats, 1.3%
Seats won	2	1
Seat change	Steady	▲1
Popular vote	1,972	3,373
Percentage	5.0%	8.5%
Swing	▲1.3%	▲7.2%
- Results of the 2019 Tewkesbury Borough Council election
Council control before election
Conservative
Council control after election
Conservative

The 2019 Tewkesbury Borough Council election took place on 2 May 2019 to elect members for the 20 wards of the Tewkesbury Borough Council in England. At the election, the Conservatives retained control of the council.

== Summary ==
=== Election result ===
2019 Tewkesbury Borough Council election
Party	Candidates	Seats	Gains	Losses	Net gain/loss	Seats %	Votes %	Votes	+/−
Conservative	38	23	N/A	N/A	▼10	60.5	41.6	16,533	–12.6
Liberal Democrats	36	8	N/A	N/A	▲5	21.1	28.8	11,450	+8.4
Independent	15	4	N/A	N/A	▲4	10.5	8.7	3,461	+5.6
Tewkesbury Independent	2	2	N/A	N/A	Steady	5.3	5.0	1,972	+1.3
Green	17	1	N/A	N/A	▲1	2.6	8.5	3,373	+7.2
Labour	12	0	N/A	N/A	Steady	0.0	5.2	2,086	–6.3
UKIP	7	0	N/A	N/A	Steady	0.0	2.2	892	–3.7

== Ward results ==
=== Badgeworth ===
Badgeworth
Party	Candidate	Votes	%	±%
Conservative	Robert Vines	322	49.8	
Liberal Democrats	Edward Ryan	157	24.3	
UKIP	David Lewis	94	14.5	
Green	Tamsin Aland	74	11.4	
Majority		165	25.5	
Turnout		653	32.2	
Conservative win (new seat)				

=== Brockworth East ===
Brockworth East
Party	Candidate	Votes	%	±%
Independent	Louise Gerrard	352	42.6	
Independent	Sara Stevens	324	39.2	
Conservative	Ronald Furolo	227	27.5	
Conservative	Philip Awford	184	22.3	
UKIP	Phillip Nash	140	16.9	
Liberal Democrats	Julie Hudson	120	14.5	
Green	Giusi Cavallaro	89	10.8	
Liberal Democrats	Karan Khazeni-Rad	70	8.5	
Majority		97	11.7	
Turnout		835	29.9	
Independent win (new seat)				
Independent win (new seat)				

=== Brockworth West ===
Brockworth West
Party	Candidate	Votes	%	±%
Independent	Craig Carter	392	38.3	
Independent	Deborah Harwood	378	36.9	
Conservative	Ruth Hatton	294	28.7	
Conservative	Harry Turbyfield	278	27.1	
Liberal Democrats	Simon Oliver	149	14.6	
Liberal Democrats	Noushien Khazeni-Rad	144	14.1	
UKIP	Sylvia Bishop	137	13.4	
Green	Jonathan Day	126	12.3	
Majority		97	11.7	
Turnout		1,032	27.7	
Independent win (new seat)				
Independent win (new seat)				

=== Churchdown Brookfield with Hucclecote ===
Churchdown Brookfield with Hucclecote
Party	Candidate	Votes	%	±%
Liberal Democrats	Richard Smith	705	44.3	
Liberal Democrats	Paul Smith	579	36.4	
Conservative	Gillian Blackwell	505	31.8	
Conservative	Alexander Evans	436	27.4	
Liberal Democrats	Gilbert Yates	421	26.5	
Conservative	Rhiannon McGarry	332	20.9	
Independent	Stephen Clarkson	327	20.6	
Independent	Richard Bishop	289	18.2	
Green	Sophie Franklin	267	16.8	
UKIP	Christina Simmonds	161	10.1	
Majority		69	4.4	
Turnout		1,595	31.18	
Liberal Democrats win (new seat)				
Liberal Democrats win (new seat)				
Conservative win (new seat)				

=== Churchdown St John's ===
Churchdown St John's
Party	Candidate	Votes	%	±%
Liberal Democrats	Mary Jordan	886	50.4	
Liberal Democrats	Clare Softley	698	39.7	
Liberal Democrats	Scott Thomson	579	32.9	
Conservative	Julie Evans	556	31.6	
Conservative	Paul Grierson	537	30.5	
Conservative	Haydn Pearl	512	29.1	
Independent	Jane Cook	412	23.4	
Green	Jacqueline Totterdell	311	17.7	
Majority		23	1.3	
Turnout		1,782	31.73	
Liberal Democrats win (new seat)				
Liberal Democrats win (new seat)				
Liberal Democrats win (new seat)				

=== Cleeve Grange ===
Cleeve Grange
Party	Candidate	Votes	%	±%
Liberal Democrats	Helen Munro	248	36.7	
Conservative	Warwick Ross	212	31.4	
Independent	Susan Hillier-Richardson	177	26.2	
Green	Jan Millett	38	5.6	
Majority		36	5.3	
Turnout		681	32.6	
Liberal Democrats win (new seat)				

=== Cleeve Hill ===
Cleeve Hill
Party	Candidate	Votes	%	±%
Conservative	Anne Hollaway	751	51.8	
Conservative	Michael Dean	679	46.8	
Liberal Democrats	Lorraine Agg	464	32.0	
Liberal Democrats	Nigel Adcock	433	29.8	
Green	Hugh Barr	241	16.6	
Labour	Rosemary Phillips	113	7.8	
Majority		215	14.8	
Turnout		1,466	37.2	
Conservative win (new seat)				
Conservative win (new seat)				

=== Cleeve St Michael's ===
Cleeve St Michael's
Party	Candidate	Votes	%	±%
Conservative	Robert East	515	45.1	
Conservative	Andrew Reece	429	37.5	
Liberal Democrats	James Habgood	235	20.6	
Independent	Andrew Walker	228	19.9	
Liberal Democrats	Anthony MacKinnon	222	19.4	
Labour	Andrew Barrell	183	16.0	
Green	Kate Aubury	174	15.2	
Labour	John Kettle	94	8.2	
Majority		194		
Turnout		1,143	27.3	
Conservative win (new seat)				
Conservative win (new seat)				

=== Cleeve West ===
Cleeve West
Party	Candidate	Votes	%	±%
Conservative	Robert Bird	517	43.4	
Liberal Democrats	Richard Stanley	494	41.5	
Conservative	Robert Garnham	458	38.5	
Liberal Democrats	Peter Richmond	386	32.4	
Green	Amanda Bown	190	16.0	
Labour	Kenneth Petersen	156	13.1	
Majority		36	3.0	
Turnout		1,207	30.25	
Conservative win (new seat)				
Liberal Democrats win (new seat)				

=== Highnam with Haw Bridge ===
Highnam with Haw Bridge
Party	Candidate	Votes	%	±%
Conservative	Jill Smith	767	56.3	
Conservative	Paul McLain	672	49.3	
Liberal Democrats	Peter Beaumont	469	34.4	
Liberal Democrats	Andrew Cooley	361	26.5	
Green	Jonathan Bristow	208	15.3	
Majority		203	14.9	
Turnout		1,386	39.34	
Conservative win (new seat)				
Conservative win (new seat)				

=== Innsworth ===
Innsworth
Party	Candidate	Votes	%	±%
Conservative	Graham Bocking	331	46.3	
Liberal Democrats	Paul Ockelton	322	45.0	
Conservative	Sarah Seccombe	309	43.2	
Green	Diane Hyett	210	29.4	
Majority		13	1.8	
Turnout		735	20.6	
Conservative win (new seat)				
Liberal Democrats win (new seat)				

=== Isbourne ===
Isbourne
Party	Candidate	Votes	%	±%
Conservative	John Evetts	649	56.0	
Conservative	Melanie Gore	624	53.8	
Liberal Democrats	Drewe Lacey	366	31.6	
Liberal Democrats	Oliver Brown	210	18.1	
Green	Robert Hawkins	210	18.1	
Majority		258	22.2	
Turnout		1,175	39.6	
Conservative win (new seat)				
Conservative win (new seat)				

=== Northway ===
Northway
Party	Candidate	Votes	%	±%
Conservative	Pauline Godwin	265	33.5	
Conservative	Elaine MacTiernan	258	32.6	
Labour	Fiona Castle	165	20.9	
UKIP	John Dockree	165	20.9	
Independent	Gordon Shurmer	154	19.5	
UKIP	Andrew Maith	140	17.7	
Independent	Peter Aldridge	134	16.9	
Labour	Edward Hudson	105	13.3	
Liberal Democrats	Nicholas Curd	89	11.3	
Majority		93	11.7	
Turnout		793	20.9	
Conservative win (new seat)				
Conservative win (new seat)				

=== Severn Vale North ===
Severn Vale North
Party	Candidate	Votes	%	±%
Conservative	Heather McLain	384	60.6	
Green	Susan Billington	142	22.4	
Liberal Democrats	Caitriona Clucas	108	17.0	
Majority		242	38.2	
Turnout		653	33.1	
Conservative win (new seat)				

=== Severn Vale South ===
Severn Vale South
Party	Candidate	Votes	%	±%
Conservative	Mark Williams	406	59.7	
Liberal Democrats	Martin Griffiths	174	25.6	
Green	Caroline Corsie	100	14.7	
Majority		232	34.1	
Turnout		698	37.0	
Conservative win (new seat)				

=== Shurdington ===
Shurdington
Party	Candidate	Votes	%	±%
Conservative	Philip Surman	260	49.9	
Liberal Democrats	George Porter	150	28.8	
Green	Graham Allen	56	10.7	
UKIP	Barry Lodge	55	10.6	
Majority		110	21.1	
Turnout		521	31.8	
Conservative win (new seat)				

=== Tewkesbury East ===
Tewkesbury East
Party	Candidate	Votes	%	±%
Conservative	Vernon Smith	610	51.5	
Conservative	Christine Reid	495	41.8	
Green	Nicola Castello	293	24.7	
Liberal Democrats	Guy Fancourt	262	22.1	
Labour	Mark Dempster	196	16.5	
Liberal Democrats	Emma Holdaway	174	14.7	
Majority		202	22.2	
Turnout		1,209	28.9	
Conservative win (new seat)				
Conservative win (new seat)				

=== Tewkesbury North and Twyning ===
Tewkesbury North and Twyning
Party	Candidate	Votes	%	±%
Tewkesbury Ind.	Michael Sztymiak	1,038	61.8	
Tewkesbury Ind.	Philip Workman	934	55.6	
Conservative	Adele Carter	265	15.8	
Conservative	Catherine Murray	252	15.0	
Independent	Kenneth Powell	148	8.8	
Independent	Mark Linton	146	8.7	
Labour	Christopher Burke	134	8.0	
Labour	Lara Chaplin	120	7.1	
Liberal Democrats	Vicki Wagstaffe	119	7.1	
Liberal Democrats	Jayne Cheslin	74	4.4	
Majority		202	22.2	
Turnout		1,695	40.00	
Tewkesbury Ind. win (new seat)				
Tewkesbury Ind. win (new seat)				

=== Tewkesbury South ===
Tewkesbury South
Party	Candidate	Votes	%	±%
Green	Catherine Cody	646	58.8	
Conservative	Kevin Cromwell	401	36.5	
Conservative	Julie Greening	375	34.2	
Liberal Democrats	Suzanna Cornakova	315	28.7	
Liberal Democrats	Philippa Cooley	141	12.8	
Majority		26	2.3	
Turnout		1,120	26.3	
Green win (new seat)				
Conservative win (new seat)				

=== Winchcombe ===
Winchcombe
Party	Candidate	Votes	%	±%
Conservative	James Mason	908	47.6	
Conservative	David Gray	613	32.1	
Conservative	John Murphy	569	29.8	
Independent	Ronald Allen	516	27.0	
Independent	Janet Day	491	25.7	
Liberal Democrats	Colin Davison	478	25.0	
Liberal Democrats	Kevin Guyll	456	23.9	
Liberal Democrats	Andrew Sclater	402	21.1	
Labour	Susan Sturgeon	361	18.9	
Labour	John Hurley	250	13.1	
Labour	David Cook	209	10.9	
Majority		53		
Turnout		1,909	35.0	
Conservative win (new seat)				
Conservative win (new seat)				
Conservative win (new seat)				

== Changes 2019–2023 ==
- Clare Softley, elected as a Liberal Democrat, left the party in October 2022 to sit as a non-aligned independent.

== By-elections ==
=== Cleeve Hill (May 2021) ===
The Cleeve Hill by-election was triggered by the death of Conservative councillor Anne Hollaway.

Cleeve Hill: 6 May 2021
Party	Candidate	Votes	%	±%
Conservative	Keja Berliner	910	46.1	−5.7
Liberal Democrats	Lorraine Agg	842	42.7	+10.7
Green	Robey Jenkins	114	5.8	−10.4
Labour	Emma Robertson	107	5.4	−2.4
Majority		68	3.4	
Turnout		1,973	47.30	
Conservative hold		Swing		

=== Brockworth East (November 2021) ===
The Brockworth East by-election followed a vacancy in the seat held by independent councillor Sara Stevens, who ceased to be a councillor by July 2021.

Brockworth East: 18 November 2021
Party	Candidate	Votes	%	±%
Independent	Charlotte Mills	499	68.3	+29.1
Conservative	Ronald Furolo	110	15.0	−12.5
Liberal Democrats	Gilbert Yates	87	11.9	−2.6
Labour	Joseph Ambrose	35	4.8	N/A
Majority		389	53.3	
Turnout		732	26.2	
Independent hold		Swing	▲38.9	

=== Brockworth East (April 2022) ===
The Brockworth East by-election followed a vacancy in the seat held by independent councillor Louise Gerrard.

Brockworth East: 14 April 2022
Party	Candidate	Votes	%	±%
Independent	Jason Mills	346	69.5	N/A
Conservative	Marc Barwick	76	15.3	+0.2
Liberal Democrats	Gilbert Yates	76	15.3	+3.4
Majority		270	54.2	
Turnout		499	17.6	
Independent hold		Swing	N/A	
