= 2019 Pendle Borough Council election =

2019 UK local government election

The 2019 Pendle Borough Council election took place on 2 May 2019.

== Background ==
Before the election, the Conservative Party had a majority on the council, with 25 seats. The Labour Party had 15 seats and the Liberal Democrats had 9 seats.

17 seats were contested at the election. The 2019 election in Pendle was also part of a Voter ID pilot.

== Results summary ==
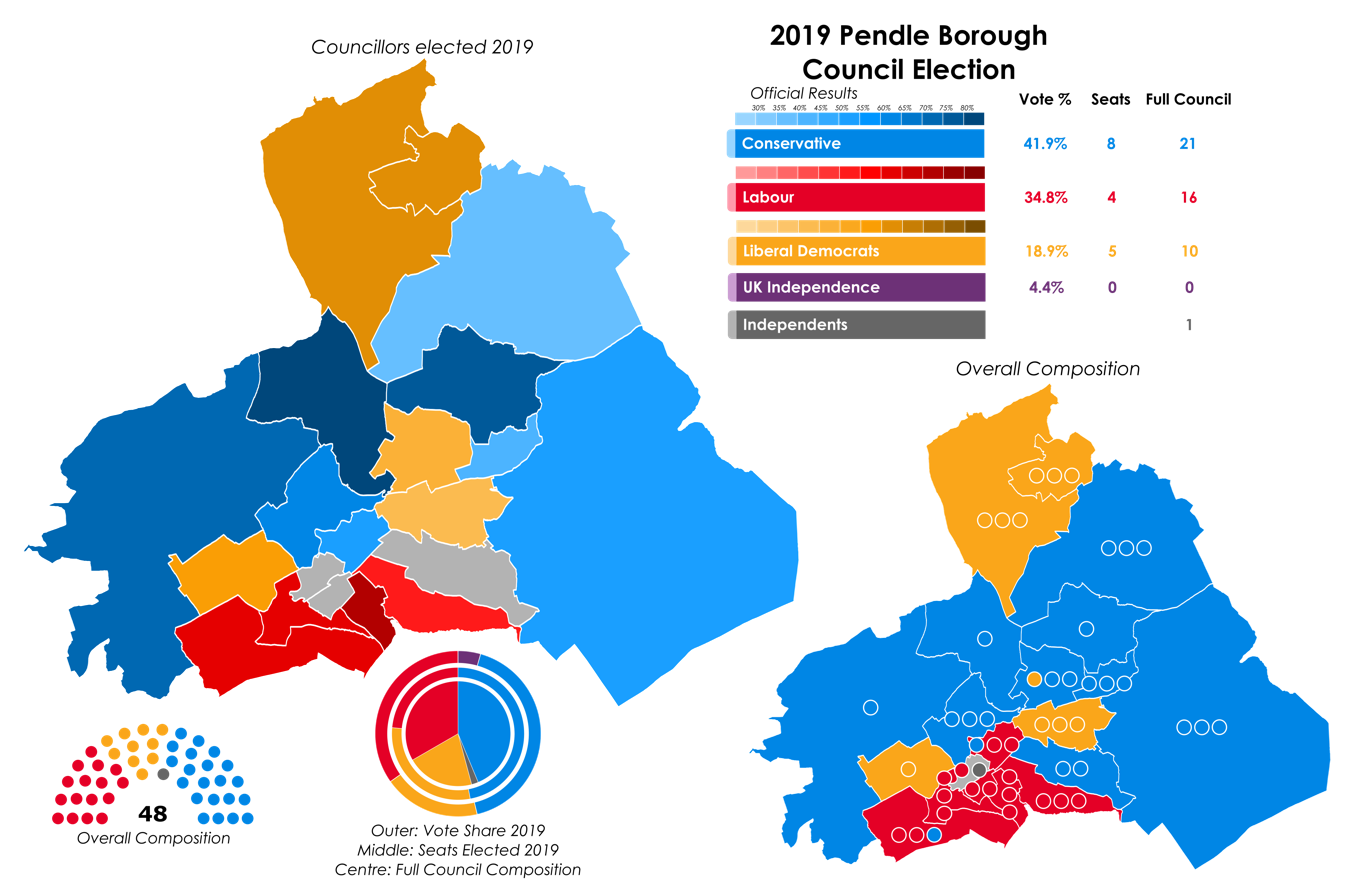
Map showing results of the 2019 Pendle Borough Council election.

2019 Pendle Borough Council election
Party	This election			Full council			This election		
Party	Seats	Net	Seats %	Other	Total	Total %	Votes	Votes %	+/−
Conservative	8	▼2	47.1	13	21	43.8	9,119	41.9	
Labour	4	▲1	23.5	12	16	33.3	7,572	34.8	
Liberal Democrats	5	▲1	29.4	5	10	20.8	4,122	18.9	
Independent	0	Steady	0.0	1	1	2.1	0	0.0	
UKIP	0	Steady	0.0	0	0	0.0	961	4.4	

== Ward results ==
=== Barrowford ===
Barrowford
Party	Candidate	Votes	%	±%
Conservative	Linda Crossley	853	61.6	
Labour	Manzar Iqbal	294	21.2	
UKIP	Mick Waddington	237	17.1	
Majority				
Turnout			36.6	
Conservative hold		Swing		

=== Blacko and Higherford ===
Blacko and Higherford
Party	Candidate	Votes	%	±%
Conservative	Noel McEvoy	423	81.0	
Labour	Robert Oliver	99	19.0	
Majority				
Turnout			38.1	
Conservative hold		Swing		

=== Boulsworth ===
Boulsworth
Party	Candidate	Votes	%	±%
Conservative	Sarah Cockburn-Price	742	52.1	
Liberal Democrats	Mary Thomas	315	22.1	
Labour Co-op	David Foat	205	14.4	
UKIP	Craig McBeth	163	11.4	
Majority				
Turnout			34.4	
Conservative hold		Swing		

=== Bradley ===
Bradley
Party	Candidate	Votes	%	±%
Conservative	Mohammad Aslam	1,196	50.9	
Labour	Nadeem Younis	1,152	49.1	
Majority				
Turnout			50.6	
Conservative gain from Labour		Swing		

=== Brierfield ===
Brierfield
Party	Candidate	Votes	%	±%
Labour	Qamar Shazad	1,163	64.6	
Conservative	Aftab Fiaz Ahmed	637	35.4	
Majority				
Turnout			49.3	
Labour gain from Conservative		Swing		

=== Clover Hill ===
Clover Hill
Party	Candidate	Votes	%	±%
Labour	Zafar Ali	932	71.1	
Conservative	Nigel Pearson-Asher	379	28.9	
Majority				
Turnout			37.0	
Labour hold		Swing		

=== Coates ===
Coates
Party	Candidate	Votes	%	±%
Liberal Democrats	Jayne Mills	777	62.3	
Conservative	Ian Lyons	269	21.6	
Labour	Euan Clouston	202	16.2	
Majority				
Turnout			30.3	
Liberal Democrats hold		Swing		

=== Craven ===
Craven
Party	Candidate	Votes	%	±%
Liberal Democrats	Kenneth Hartley	826	63.5	
Conservative	Rebecca Lyons	301	23.1	
Labour	Omar Ahmed	174	13.4	
Majority				
Turnout			32.0	
Liberal Democrats hold		Swing		

=== Earby ===
Earby
Party	Candidate	Votes	%	±%
Conservative	Colin Carter	612	38.9	
Liberal Democrats	Doris Haigh	540	34.3	
UKIP	Jordan Cassidy	237	15.0	
Labour	Robert Khan	186	11.8	
Majority				
Turnout			33.3	
Conservative hold		Swing		

=== Foulridge ===
Foulridge
Party	Candidate	Votes	%	±%
Conservative	Graham Waugh	386	79.4	
Labour	Robert French	100	20.6	
Majority				
Turnout			36.8	
Conservative hold		Swing		

=== Higham and Pendleside ===
Higham and Pendleside
Party	Candidate	Votes	%	±%
Conservative	Carlo Lionti	427	71.2	
Labour	Susan Nike	173	28.8	
Majority				
Turnout			42.6	
Conservative hold		Swing		

=== Horsfield ===
Horsfield
Party	Candidate	Votes	%	±%
Conservative	Jonathan Nixon	403	41.1	
Labour	Wayne Blackburn	229	23.3	
Liberal Democrats	Anthony Chamberlain	182	18.6	
UKIP	Thomas Walker	167	17.0	
Majority				
Turnout			26.9	
Conservative hold		Swing		

=== Old Laund Booth ===
Old Laund Booth
Party	Candidate	Votes	%	±%
Liberal Democrats	Brian Newman	373	56.3	
Conservative	Christopher Hartley	266	40.2	
Labour	Laura Blackburn	23	3.5	
Majority				
Turnout			55.1	
Liberal Democrats hold		Swing		

=== Reedley ===
Reedley
Party	Candidate	Votes	%	±%
Labour	Mohammed Hanif	1,517	63.1	
Conservative	Pauline McCormick	887	36.9	
Majority				
Turnout			55.4	
Labour gain from Conservative		Swing		

=== Southfield ===
Southfield
Party	Candidate	Votes	%	±%
Labour	Yvonne Tennant	728	51.4	
Conservative	Mohammed Adnan	580	41.0	
Liberal Democrats	Paul Graham	108	7.6	
Majority				
Turnout			36.6	
Labour hold		Swing		

=== Vivary Bridge ===
Vivary Bridge
Party	Candidate	Votes	%	±%
Liberal Democrats	David Clegg	535	45.6	
Conservative	Joe Cooney	438	37.4	
Labour	Patricia Hannah-Wood	199	17.0	
Majority				
Turnout			28.1	
Liberal Democrats gain from Conservative		Swing		

=== Waterside ===
Waterside
Party	Candidate	Votes	%	±%
Liberal Democrats	Alice Mann	466	40.9	
Conservative	Ash Sutcliffe	320	28.1	
Labour	Anthony Harmson	196	17.2	
UKIP	Donna Eastham	157	13.8	
Majority				
Turnout			30.2	
Liberal Democrats hold		Swing		
