= United Kingdom national and local elections =

== Scotland ==
- Scottish Parliament elections
  - 1999 Scottish Parliament election
  - 2003 Scottish Parliament election
  - 2007 Scottish Parliament election
  - 2011 Scottish Parliament election
  - 2016 Scottish Parliament election
  - 2021 Scottish Parliament election

== Wales ==
- Senedd elections
  - 1999 National Assembly for Wales election
  - 2003 National Assembly for Wales election
  - 2007 National Assembly for Wales election
  - 2011 National Assembly for Wales election
  - 2016 National Assembly for Wales election
  - 2021 Senedd election

== Northern Ireland ==
- Northern Ireland Assembly elections
  - 1998 Northern Ireland Assembly election
  - 2003 Northern Ireland Assembly election
  - 2007 Northern Ireland Assembly election
  - 2011 Northern Ireland Assembly election
  - 2016 Northern Ireland Assembly election
  - 2017 Northern Ireland Assembly election
  - 2022 Northern Ireland Assembly election

== Greater London ==
- Greater London Authority elections
  - Mayor of London
    - 2000 London mayoral election
    - 2004 London mayoral election
    - 2008 London mayoral election
    - 2012 London mayoral election
    - 2016 London mayoral election
    - 2021 London mayoral election
  - London Assembly
    - 2000 London Assembly election
    - 2004 London Assembly election
    - 2008 London Assembly election
    - 2012 London Assembly election
    - 2016 London Assembly election
    - 2021 London Assembly election
- Greater London Council elections
  - 1964, 1967, 1970, 1973, 1977, 1981

== Local elections ==
=== Elections by year ===
- 1973
- 1975
- 1976
- 1977
- 1978
- 1979
- 1977
- 1980
- 1981
- 1982
- 1983
- 1984
- 1985
- 1986
- 1987
- 1988
- 1989
- 1990
- 1991
- 1993
- 1993
- 1994
- 1995
- 1996
- 1997
- 1998
- 1999
- 2000
- 2001
- 2002
- 2003
- 2004
- 2005
- 2006
- 2007
- 2008
- 2009
- 2010
- 2011
- 2013
- 2014
- 2015
- 2016
- 2017
- 2018
- 2019
- 2021
- 2022
- 2023

=== English elections by council ===
- Adur local elections
- Allerdale local elections
- Alnwick local elections
- Amber Valley local elections
- Arun local elections
- Ashfield local elections
- Ashford local elections
- Aylesbury Vale local elections
- Babergh local elections
- Barking and Dagenham local elections
- Barnet local elections
- Barnsley local elections
- Barrow-in-Furness local elections
- Basildon local elections
- Basingstoke and Deane local elections
- Bassetlaw local elections
- Bath and North East Somerset local elections
- Bedford local elections
- Bedfordshire local elections
- Berwick upon Tweed local elections
- Bexley local elections
- Birmingham local elections
- Blaby local elections
- Blackburn with Darwen local elections
- Blackpool local elections
- Blyth Valley local elections
- Bolsover local elections
- Bolton local elections
- Boston local elections
- Bournemouth, Christchurch and Poole Council elections
- Bournemouth local elections
- Bracknell Forest local elections
- Bradford local elections
- Braintree local elections
- Breckland local elections
- Brentwood local elections
- Brent local elections
- Bridgnorth local elections
- Brighton and Hove local elections
- Bristol local elections
- Broadland local elections
- Bromley local elections
- Bromsgrove local elections
- Broxbourne local elections
- Broxtowe local elections
- Buckinghamshire local elections
- Burnley local elections
- Bury local elections
- Calderdale local elections
- Cambridge local elections
- Cambridgeshire local elections
- Camden local elections
- Cannock Chase local elections
- Canterbury local elections
- Caradon local elections
- Carlisle local elections
- Carrick local elections
- Castle Morpeth local elections
- Castle Point local elections
- Central Bedfordshire local elections
- Charnwood local elections
- Chelmsford local elections
- Cheltenham local elections
- Cherwell local elections
- Cheshire local elections
- Cheshire East local elections
- Cheshire West and Chester local elections
- Chester local elections
- Chester-le-Street local elections
- Chesterfield local elections
- Chichester local elections
- Chiltern local elections
- Chorley local elections
- Christchurch local elections
- City of Durham local elections
- Colchester local elections
- Congleton local elections
- Copeland local elections
- Corby local elections
- Cornwall local elections
- Cotswold local elections
- County Durham local elections
- Coventry local elections
- Craven local elections
- Crawley local elections
- Crewe and Nantwich local elections
- Croydon local elections
- Cumbria local elections
- Dacorum local elections
- Darlington local elections
- Dartford local elections
- Daventry local elections
- Derby local elections
- Derbyshire local elections
- Derbyshire Dales local elections
- Derwentside local elections
- Devon local elections
- Doncaster local elections
- Dorset County Council elections
- Dorset Council elections
- Dover local elections
- Dudley local elections
- Ealing local elections
- Easington local elections
- East Cambridgeshire local elections
- East Devon local elections
- East Dorset local elections
- East Hampshire local elections
- East Hertfordshire local elections
- East Lindsey local elections
- East Northamptonshire local elections
- East Riding of Yorkshire local elections
- East Staffordshire local elections
- East Sussex local elections
- Eastbourne local elections
- Eastleigh local elections
- Eden local elections
- Ellesmere Port and Neston local elections
- Elmbridge local elections
- Enfield local elections
- Epping Forest local elections
- Epsom and Ewell local elections
- Erewash local elections
- Essex local elections
- Exeter local elections
- Fareham local elections
- Fenland local elections
- Forest Heath local elections
- Forest of Dean local elections
- Fylde local elections
- Gateshead local elections
- Gedling local elections
- Gloucester local elections
- Gloucestershire local elections
- Gosport local elections
- Gravesham local elections
- Great Yarmouth local elections
- Greenwich local elections
- Guildford local elections
- Hackney local elections
- Halton local elections
- Hambleton local elections
- Hammersmith and Fulham local elections
- Hampshire local elections
- Harborough local elections
- Haringey local elections
- Harlow local elections
- Harrogate local elections
- Harrow local elections
- Hart local elections
- Hartlepool local elections
- Hastings local elections
- Havant local elections
- Havering local elections
- Herefordshire local elections
- Hertfordshire local elections
- Hertsmere local elections
- High Peak local elections
- Hillingdon local elections
- Hinckley and Bosworth local elections
- Horsham local elections
- Hounslow local elections
- Huntingdonshire local elections
- Hyndburn local elections
- Ipswich local elections
- Isle of Wight local elections
- Islington local elections
- Kennet local elections
- Kensington and Chelsea local elections
- Kent local elections
- Kerrier local elections
- Kettering local elections
- King's Lynn and West Norfolk local elections
- Kingston upon Hull local elections
- Kingston upon Thames local elections
- Kirklees local elections
- Knowsley local elections
- Lambeth local elections
- Lancashire local elections
- Lancaster local elections
- Leeds local elections
- Leicester local elections
- Leicestershire local elections
- Lewes local elections
- Lewisham local elections
- Lichfield local elections
- Lincoln local elections
- Lincolnshire local elections
- Liverpool local elections
- Luton local elections
- Macclesfield local elections
- Maidstone local elections
- Maldon local elections
- Malvern Hills local elections
- Manchester local elections
- Mansfield local elections
- Medway local elections
- Melton local elections
- Mendip local elections
- Merton local elections
- Mid Bedfordshire local elections
- Mid Devon local elections
- Mid Suffolk local elections
- Mid Sussex local elections
- Middlesbrough local elections
- Milton Keynes local elections
- Mole Valley local elections
- New Forest local elections
- Newark and Sherwood local elections
- Newcastle upon Tyne local elections
- Newcastle-under-Lyme local elections
- Newham local elections
- Norfolk local elections
- North Cornwall local elections
- North Devon local elections
- North Dorset local elections
- North East Derbyshire local elections
- North East Lincolnshire local elections
- North Hertfordshire local elections
- North Kesteven local elections
- North Lincolnshire local elections
- North Norfolk local elections
- North Shropshire local elections
- North Somerset local elections
- North Tyneside local elections
- North Warwickshire local elections
- North West Leicestershire local elections
- North Wiltshire local elections
- North Yorkshire local elections
- Northampton local elections
- Northamptonshire local elections
- Northumberland local elections
- Norwich local elections
- Nottingham local elections
- Nottinghamshire local elections
- Nuneaton and Bedworth local elections
- Oadby and Wigston local elections
- Oldham local elections
- Oswestry local elections
- Oxford local elections
- Oxfordshire local elections
- Pendle local elections
- Penwith local elections
- Peterborough local elections
- Plymouth local elections
- Poole local elections
- Portsmouth local elections
- Preston local elections
- Purbeck local elections
- Reading local elections
- Redbridge local elections
- Redcar and Cleveland local elections
- Redditch local elections
- Reigate and Banstead local elections
- Restormel local elections
- Ribble Valley local elections
- Richmond upon Thames local elections
- Richmondshire local elections
- Rochdale local elections
- Rochford local elections
- Rossendale local elections
- Rother local elections
- Rotherham local elections
- Rugby local elections
- Runnymede local elections
- Rushcliffe local elections
- Rushmoor local elections
- Rutland local elections
- Ryedale local elections
- St Albans local elections
- St Edmundsbury local elections
- St Helens local elections
- Salisbury local elections
- Salford local elections
- Sandwell local elections
- Scarborough local elections
- Sedgefield local elections
- Sedgemoor local elections
- Sefton local elections
- Selby local elections
- Sevenoaks local elections
- Sheffield local elections
- Shepway local elections
- Shrewsbury and Atcham local elections
- Shropshire local elections
- Slough local elections
- Solihull local elections
- Somerset local elections
- South Bedfordshire local elections
- South Buckinghamshire local elections
- South Cambridgeshire local elections
- South Gloucestershire local elections
- South Derbyshire local elections
- South Hams local elections
- South Holland local elections
- South Kesteven local elections
- South Lakeland local elections
- South Norfolk local elections
- South Northamptonshire local elections
- South Oxfordshire local elections
- South Ribble local elections
- South Shropshire local elections
- South Somerset local elections
- South Staffordshire local elections
- South Tyneside local elections
- Southampton local elections
- Southend-on-Sea local elections
- Southwark local elections
- Spelthorne local elections
- Stafford local elections
- Staffordshire local elections
- Staffordshire Moorlands local elections
- Stevenage local elections
- Stockport local elections
- Stockton-on-Tees local elections
- Stoke-on-Trent local elections
- Stratford-on-Avon local elections
- Stroud local elections
- Suffolk local elections
- Suffolk Coastal local elections
- Sunderland local elections
- Surrey local elections
- Surrey Heath local elections
- Sutton local elections
- Swale local elections
- Swindon local elections
- Tameside local elections
- Tamworth local elections
- Tandridge local elections
- Taunton Deane local elections
- Teesdale local elections
- Teignbridge local elections
- Telford and Wrekin local elections
- Tendring local elections
- Test Valley local elections
- Tewkesbury local elections
- Thanet local elections
- Three Rivers local elections
- Thurrock local elections
- Tonbridge and Malling local elections
- Torbay local elections
- Torridge local elections
- Tower Hamlets local elections
- Trafford local elections
- Tunbridge Wells local elections
- Tynedale local elections
- Uttlesford local elections
- Vale of White Horse local elections
- Vale Royal local elections
- Wakefield local elections
- Walsall local elections
- Waltham Forest local elections
- Wandsworth local elections
- Wansbeck local elections
- Warrington local elections
- Warwick District Council elections
- Warwickshire local elections
- Watford local elections
- Waveney local elections
- Waverley local elections
- Wealden local elections
- Wear Valley local elections
- Wellingborough local elections
- Welwyn Hatfield local elections
- West Berkshire local elections
- West Devon local elections
- West Dorset local elections
- West Lancashire local elections
- West Lindsey local elections
- West Oxfordshire local elections
- West Somerset local elections
- West Sussex local elections
- West Wiltshire local elections
- Westminster local elections
- Weymouth and Portland local elections
- Wigan local elections
- Wiltshire local elections
- Winchester local elections
- Windsor and Maidenhead local elections
- Wirral local elections
- Woking local elections
- Wokingham local elections
- Wolverhampton local elections
- Worcester local elections
- Worcestershire local elections
- Worthing local elections
- Wychavon local elections
- Wycombe local elections
- Wyre local elections
- Wyre Forest local elections
- York local elections

=== Welsh elections by council ===
- Blaenau Gwent local elections
- Bridgend local elections
- Caerphilly local elections
- Cardiff local elections
- Carmarthenshire local elections
- Ceredigion local elections
- Conwy local elections
- Denbighshire local elections
- Flintshire local elections
- Gwynedd local elections
- Isle of Anglesey local elections
- Merthyr Tydfil local elections
- Monmouthshire local elections
- Neath Port Talbot local elections
- Newport local elections
- Pembrokeshire local elections
- Powys local elections
- Rhondda Cynon Taf local elections
- Swansea local elections
- Torfaen local elections
- Vale of Glamorgan local elections
- Wrexham local elections

== See also ==
- Elections in the United Kingdom
