= Bromsgrove District Council elections =

Local government elections in Worcestershire, England

Bromsgrove District Council elections are held every four years. Bromsgrove District Council is the local authority for the non-metropolitan district of Bromsgrove in Worcestershire, England. Since the last boundary changes in 2015, 31 councillors are elected from 30 wards.

== Council elections ==
- 1973 Bromsgrove District Council election
- 1976 Bromsgrove District Council election
- 1979 Bromsgrove District Council election (New ward boundaries)
- 1983 Bromsgrove District Council election
- 1987 Bromsgrove District Council election
- 1991 Bromsgrove District Council election
- 1995 Bromsgrove District Council election (New ward boundaries & district boundary changes also took place)
- 1999 Bromsgrove District Council election - Conservative 30, Labour 7, Others 2
- 2003 Bromsgrove District Council election (New ward boundaries) - Conservative 26, Labour 8, Residents Association 4, Independent 1
- 2007 Bromsgrove District Council election - Conservative 26, Labour 6, Residents Association 2, Liberal Democrat 1, Others 4
- 2011 Bromsgrove District Council election
- 2015 Bromsgrove District Council election (New ward boundaries)
- 2019 Bromsgrove District Council election
- 2023 Bromsgrove District Council election

== Results maps ==
2003 results map

2007 results map

2011 results map

2015 results map

2019 results map

2023 results map

== By-election results ==
=== 1995-1999 ===
Catshill By-Election 22 October 1998
Party	Candidate	Votes	%	±%
Conservative	Pam Collins	639	64.4	+27.2
Labour		353	35.6	−27.2
Majority		286	28.8	
Turnout		992	20.0	
Conservative gain from Labour		Swing		

=== 1999-2003 ===
Catshill By-Election 28 October 1999
Party	Candidate	Votes	%	±%
Conservative	Len Boden	577	57.5	−9.0
Labour	Gordon Witcomb	426	42.5	+9.0
Majority		151	15.0	
Turnout		1,003	20.5	
Conservative hold		Swing		

Whitford By-Election 16 December 1999
Party	Candidate	Votes	%	±%
Conservative	Alan Dent	343	51.1	+4.3
Labour	Judy Marshall	314	43.5	+3.0
Liberal Democrats	Michael Mihailovic	39	5.4	−7.4
Majority		55	7.6	
Turnout		696	16.0	
Conservative hold		Swing		

Furlongs By-Election 13 April 2000
Party	Candidate	Votes	%	±%
Conservative	Janice Boswell	574	78.4	+3.8
Labour	Anthony Zalin	158	21.6	−3.8
Majority		416	56.8	
Turnout		732	22.0	
Conservative hold		Swing		

=== 2003-2007 ===
Sidemoor By-Election 19 February 2004
Party	Candidate	Votes	%	±%
Labour	Athol Deakin	549	52.3	−7.9
Independent	Angela Hadley	349	33.3	+33.3
Conservative	Sally Harfield	151	14.4	−25.4
Majority		200	19.0	
Turnout		1,049	27.0	
Labour hold		Swing		

Slideslow By-Election 9 December 2004
Party	Candidate	Votes	%	±%
Liberal Democrats	Gordon Selway	435	47.2	+14.8
Conservative	Sheila Blagg	207	22.5	−25.2
Independent	David Pardoe	165	17.9	+17.9
Labour	Elaine Shannon	114	12.4	−7.5
Majority		228	24.7	
Turnout		921	23.9	
Liberal Democrats gain from Conservative		Swing		

Wythall South By-Election 6 April 2006
Party	Candidate	Votes	%	±%
Conservative	James Duddy	526	71.1	+38.1
Independent	Nigel Huggins	165	22.3	−44.7
Labour	Christopher Bloore	49	6.6	+6.6
Majority		361	48.8	
Turnout		740	38.2	
Conservative gain from Independent		Swing		

=== 2007-2011 ===
Slideslow By-Election 28 February 2008
Party	Candidate	Votes	%	±%
Conservative	Diane Campbell	372	33.9	−11.9
Independent	Dean Smith	317	28.8	+15.7
Labour	Christopher Bloore	304	27.7	+27.7
UKIP	Dale Carter	104	9.5	+9.5
Majority		55	5.0	
Turnout		1,097	28.8	
Conservative gain from Liberal Democrats		Swing		

Marlbrook By-Election 16 December 2010
Party	Candidate	Votes	%	±%
Conservative	John Ruck	284	35.0	−27.7
Labour	Martin Knight	236	29.1	−8.2
Independent	Charlie Bateman	138	17.0	+17.0
UKIP	Steven Morson	68	8.4	+8.4
Liberal Democrats	Janet King	67	8.3	+8.3
Green	Peter Harvey	14	1.7	+1.7
Independent	Kenneth Wheatley	4	0.5	+0.5
Majority		48	5.9	
Turnout		811		
Conservative hold		Swing		

=== 2015-2019 ===
Norton By-Election 19 January 2017
Party	Candidate	Votes	%	±%
Conservative	Michael Webb	219	43.2	−16.6
Labour	Rory Shannon	186	36.7	+7.1
UKIP	Adrian Smart	82	16.2	+16.2
Green	Michelle Baker	20	3.9	−6.6
Majority		33	6.5	
Turnout		507		
Conservative hold		Swing		

Alvechurch Village By-Election 8 June 2017
Party	Candidate	Votes	%	±%
Independent	Kate van der Plank	893	51.0	+51.0
Conservative	Luisa Nixon	583	33.3	−12.3
Liberal Democrats	Siobhan Hughes	175	10.0	+10.0
Independent	Kenneth Wheatley	99	5.7	+5.7
Majority		310	17.7	
Turnout		1,750		
Independent gain from Conservative		Swing		

=== 2023-2027 ===
Sidemoor By-Election 19 September 2024
Party	Candidate	Votes	%	±%
Liberal Democrats	James Clarke	276	52.6	+25.1
Conservative	Rita Dent	141	26.9	+3.3
Labour	Jennifer Smith	87	16.6	−28.8
Green	Peter Measham	21	4.0	+4.0
Majority		135	25.7	
Turnout		525		
Liberal Democrats gain from Labour		Swing		
