= 2015 Taunton Deane Borough Council election =

2015 UK local government election

Map of the results of the 2015 Taunton Deane Borough Council election. Conservatives in blue, Liberal Democrats in yellow, Labour in red, UKIP in purple and Independents in grey.

The 2015 Taunton Deane Borough Council election took place on 7 May 2015 to elect all members (councillors) of Taunton Deane Borough Council in Somerset, England. The council changed from being under no overall control to a Conservative majority having won 36 seats, while local Liberal Democrats took by keeping existing seats 14. Labour candidates won two seats, and the UK Independence Party won one, with the three remaining held by Independent candidates.

After the 2011 elections, the council was under no overall control, with the Conservatives having 28 seats, exactly half, while the Liberal Democrats took 23. The remaining five seats were split between Labour and Independents councillors.

== Results ==
Seats held:
1. Conservative Party, 36 (64.3%)
2. Liberal Democrats, 14 (25.0%)
3. Independents, 3 (5.40%)
4. Labour Party, 2 (3.60%)
5. UKIP, 1 (1.80%)

Taunton Deane Borough Council Election result: 2015
Party	Seats	Gains	Losses	Net gain/loss	Seats %	Votes %	Votes	+/−
Conservative	36	8	0	+8	64.3	43.2	49,934	
Liberal Democrats	14	0	9	–9	25.0	34.3	39,608	
Independent	3	1	0	+1	5.4	4.6	5,310	
Labour	2	0	1	–1	3.6	8.0	9,268	
UKIP	1	1	0	+1	1.8	1.2	1,349	
Green	0	0	0	0	0	8.6	9,939	
TUSC	0	0	0	0	0	0.1	93	
