= East Lindsey District Council elections =

Local government elections in Lincolnshire, England

East Lindsey District Council in Lincolnshire, England is elected every four years. The district is divided into 37 wards, electing 55 councillors. The last ward boundary changes came into effect in 2015.

== Council elections ==
- 1973 East Lindsey District Council election
- 1976 East Lindsey District Council election
- 1979 East Lindsey District Council election
- 1983 East Lindsey District Council election (New ward boundaries)
- 1987 East Lindsey District Council election
- 1991 East Lindsey District Council election
- 1995 East Lindsey District Council election
- 1999 East Lindsey District Council election (New ward boundaries)
- 2003 East Lindsey District Council election
- 2007 East Lindsey District Council election
- 2011 East Lindsey District Council election
- 2015 East Lindsey District Council election (New ward boundaries)
- 2019 East Lindsey District Council election
- 2023 East Lindsey District Council election

== Results maps ==
2003 results map

2007 results map

2011 results map

2015 results map

2019 results map

2023 results map

== By-election results ==
=== 1995-1999 ===
North Somercotes By-Election 10 July 1997
Party	Candidate	Votes	%	±%
Labour		247	50.4	+3.1
Independent		174	35.5	−3.6
Liberal Democrats		69	14.1	+14.1
Majority		73	14.9	
Turnout		490	26.0	
Labour hold		Swing		

Sibsey By-Election 30 October 1997
Party	Candidate	Votes	%	±%
Independent		190	59.4	
Labour		130	40.6	
Majority		60	18.8	
Turnout		320	15.0	
Independent hold		Swing		

=== 1999-2003 ===
Ludford By-Election 24 June 1999
Party	Candidate	Votes	%	±%
Conservative		305	48.2	
Independent		147	23.1	
Labour		132	21.0	
Independent		49	7.7	
Majority		158	25.1	
Turnout		633	39.0	

Tetney By-Election 27 June 2002
Party	Candidate	Votes	%	±%
Conservative		241	62.0	
Liberal Democrats		148	38.0	
Majority		93	24.0	
Turnout		389	21.0	
Conservative gain from Independent		Swing		

Louth St Mary's By-Election 9 January 2003
Party	Candidate	Votes	%	±%
Labour	Rosalie Morrison	243	36.5	−5.2
Conservative		229	34.4	−23.9
Liberal Democrats		193	29.0	+29.0
Majority		14	2.1	
Turnout		665	40.5	
Labour gain from Conservative		Swing		

=== 2003-2007 ===
Tetford By-Election 14 July 2005
Party	Candidate	Votes	%	±%
Conservative	Jacqueline MacKenzie	244	45.8	+7.2
Liberal Democrats	Ian Shephard	143	26.8	+3.7
Independent	Giles Crust	77	14.4	−23.9
Independent	Patrick O'Neill	69	12.9	−25.4
Majority		101	19.0	
Turnout		533	30.5	
Conservative hold		Swing		

Mablethorpe East By-Election 27 April 2006
Party	Candidate	Votes	%	±%
Labour	Anthony Howard	213	42.9	+10.2
Conservative	Charles Handley	123	24.8	+24.8
Liberal Democrats	Helen Parkhurst	114	23.0	−12.9
UKIP	Christopher Pain	46	9.3	+9.3
Majority		90	18.1	
Turnout		496	34.1	
Labour gain from Liberal Democrats		Swing		

Skegness St Clements By-Election 30 November 2006
Party	Candidate	Votes	%	±%
Labour	Phil Kemp	356	46.7	
Conservative	Mike Perry	249	32.7	
UKIP	Chrisopher Pain	157	20.6	
Majority		107	14.0	
Turnout		762	20.0	
Labour hold		Swing		

Sutton on Sea South By-Election 30 November 2006
Party	Candidate	Votes	%	±%
Liberal Democrats		273	44.5	+28.1
Independent		198	32.3	−19.7
Labour		142	23.2	+23.2
Majority		75	12.2	
Turnout		613	31.0	
Liberal Democrats gain from Independent		Swing		

=== 2007-2011 ===
Roughton By-Election 7 February 2008
Party	Candidate	Votes	%	±%
Independent	Jean Hill	383	64.0	+20.6
Conservative	Michael Clarke	215	36.0	−7.5
Majority		168	28.0	
Turnout		598	32.7	
Independent gain from Conservative		Swing		

Sibsey By-Election 22 October 2009
Party	Candidate	Votes	%	±%
Conservative	Michael Clarke	unopposed		
Conservative gain from Independent		Swing		

North Holme By-Election 17 June 2010
Party	Candidate	Votes	%	±%
Labour	Philip Sturman	142	27.6	+27.6
Conservative	Fran Treanor	111	21.6	+21.6
BNP	Jez Boothman	102	19.8	−4.9
Liberal Democrats	Mary Finch	88	17.1	−58.2
Independent	Susan Locking	72	14.0	+14.0
Majority		31	6.0	
Turnout		515		
Labour gain from Liberal Democrats		Swing		

=== 2011-2015 ===
Sutton on Sea North By-Election 11 October 2012
Party	Candidate	Votes	%	±%
Mablethorpe and Sutton-on-Sea First	Steve Palmer	330	54.9	−13.2
Conservative	David Andrews	118	19.6	−1.8
Labour	Joyce Taylor	90	15.0	+4.5
Independent	Ian Wild	63	10.5	+10.5
Majority		212	35.3	
Turnout		601		
Mablethorpe and Sutton-on-Sea First hold		Swing		

Coningsby and Tattershall By-Election 2 May 2013
Party	Candidate	Votes	%	±%
UKIP	Julia Pears	710	55.1	+55.1
Conservative	Richard Avison	578	44.9	−3.7
Majority		132	10.2	
Turnout		1,288		
UKIP gain from Liberal Democrats		Swing		

Frithville By-Election 12 September 2013
Party	Candidate	Votes	%	±%
Conservative	Neil Jones	221	57.6	+23.7
UKIP	Colin Mair	163	42.4	+42.4
Majority		58	15.2	
Turnout		384		
Conservative gain from Independent		Swing		

Chapel St Leonards By-Election 3 October 2013
Party	Candidate	Votes	%	±%
Labour	Fiona Brown	382	33.5	+33.5
UKIP	Giles Crust	228	20.0	+20.0
Independent	Richard Enderby	206	18.1	+18.1
Independent	Mel Turton-Leivers	175	15.4	+15.4
Conservative	Kevin Sharpe	149	13.1	−18.9
Majority		154	13.5	
Turnout		1,140		
Labour gain from Independent		Swing		

Horncastle By-Election 24 April 2014
Party	Candidate	Votes	%	±%
Conservative	Richard Avison	432	38.4	+4.3
Independent	David Roark	353	31.4	+31.4
UKIP	Mike Beecham	339	30.2	+30.2
Majority		79	7.0	
Turnout		1,124		
Conservative hold		Swing		

=== 2019-2023 ===
Chapel St Leonards By-Election 6 May 2021
Party	Candidate	Votes	%	±%
Conservative	Graham Williams	795	67.4	+10.8
Labour	Isaac Bailey	206	17.5	−25.9
Skegness Urban District Society	Ady Findley	121	10.3	+10.3
Independent	Steve Walmsley	58	4.9	+4.9
Majority		589	49.9	
Turnout		1,180		
Conservative hold		Swing		

Chapel St Leonards By-Election 20 January 2022
Party	Candidate	Votes	%	±%
Conservative	Stephen Evans	436	62.0	+5.4
Independent	David Fenton	267	38.0	+38.0
Majority		169	24.0	
Turnout		703		
Conservative hold		Swing		

Halton Holegate By-Election 3 March 2022
Party	Candidate	Votes	%	±%
Conservative	Terry Taylor	306	66.2	+41.5
Labour	Keziah Wood	156	33.8	+25.7
Majority		150	32.4	
Turnout		462		
Conservative gain from Independent		Swing		

=== 2023-2027 ===
Croft By-Election 24 October 2024
Party	Candidate	Votes	%	±%
Conservative	Carl Drury	198	46.5	N/A
Skegness Urban District Society	Adrian Findley	79	18.5	N/A
Liberal Democrats	David Tucker	75	17.6	N/A
Independent	Paul Collins	48	11.3	N/A
Green	Phil Gaskell	21	4.9	N/A
Labour	Mark Anderson	5	1.2	N/A
Majority		119	27.9	
Turnout		426		
Conservative hold		Swing		

This ward was uncontested at the 2023 election.

Chapel St Leonards By-Election 13 November 2025
Party	Candidate	Votes	%	±%
Reform	Paul Sutton	586	65.8	
Conservative	Alan Vassar	139	15.6	
Independent	Valerie Worley	60	6.7	
Labour	Carole Clark	48	5.4	
Liberal Democrats	David Tucker	42	4.7	
Independent	Jason Boswell	15	1.7	
Majority		447	50.2	
Turnout		890		
Reform gain from Conservative		Swing		
