= Surrey Heath Borough Council elections =

Local government elections in Surrey, England

Surrey Heath Borough Council in Surrey was elected every four years. Since the latest boundary changes in 2019, 35 councillors are elected to 14 wards of which seven are three member and the remainder are two member. The council is due to be abolished on 1 April 2027 following structural changes to local government in Surrey.

== Council elections ==
Composition of the council
Year	Conservative	Labour	Liberal Democrats (Note: Includes totals for the predecessors of the Liberal Democrats, the Liberal Party and SDP (both of which participated in the Alliance).)	Green (Note: Includes totals for the predecessors of the Green Party of England and Wales, the Ecology Party and Green Party UK.)	Independents & Others	Council control after election
Local government reorganisation; council established (36 seats)
1973	35	0	0	–	1	Conservative
New ward boundaries (36 seats)
1976	31	2	0	0	3	Conservative
1979	36	0	0	0	0	Conservative
1983	36	0	0	0	0	Conservative
1987	36	0	0	0	0	Conservative
1991	31	1	4	0	0	Conservative
1995	22	5	7	0	2	Conservative
1999	20	7	7	0	2 (Note: 2 vacant seats)	Conservative
New ward boundaries (40 seats)
2003	22	3	13	0	2	Conservative
2007	30	2	7	0	1	Conservative
2011	36	2	0	0	2	Conservative
2015	36	1	1	0	2	Conservative
New ward boundaries (40 seats)
2019	18	1	10	2	4	Conservative
2023	6	2	24	0	3	Liberal Democrats

== Results maps ==
2003 results map

2007 results map

2011 results map

2015 results map

2019 results map

2023 results map

== By-election results ==
=== 2007–2011 ===
Bagshot By-election 13 December 2007
Party	Candidate	Votes	%	±%
Liberal Democrats	Gret Woodason	720	55.0	+5.2
Conservative	Valerie White	590	45.0	−5.2
Majority		130	10.0	
Turnout		1,310	31.2	
Liberal Democrats hold		Swing		

=== 2011–2015 ===
Old Dean By-election 4 November 2014
Party	Candidate	Votes	%	±%
Labour	Heather Gerred	290	44.1	−5.7
Conservative	Max Nelson	196	29.8	−0.5
UKIP	Eddie Hill	171	26.0	+14.3
Majority		94	14.3	
Turnout		657		
Labour hold		Swing		

=== 2019–2023 ===
Bagshot By-election 6 May 2021
Party	Candidate	Votes	%	±%
Conservative	Mark Gordon	1,225	54.1	+14.2
Liberal Democrats	Richard Wilson	1,038	45.9	−2.3
Majority		187	8.3	
Turnout		2,263		
Conservative gain from Liberal Democrats		Swing		

Frimley Green By-election 14 October 2021
Party	Candidate	Votes	%	±%
Conservative	Stuart Black	896	48.4	
Liberal Democrats	Jacques Olmo	877	47.4	
Majority		19	1.0	
Turnout		1,310		
Conservative gain from Liberal Democrats		Swing		

Bisley and West End By-election 14 April 2022
Party	Candidate	Votes	%	±%
Liberal Democrats	Liz Noble	1286	66.2	▲43.1
Conservative	Tony Henderson	662	33.8	▼6.2
Majority		624	31.9	▲14.4
Turnout		1,956	28.3	▼2.7
Liberal Democrats gain from Conservative		Swing	24.65	

=== 2023–2027 ===
Old Dean By-election 24 October 2024
Party	Candidate	Votes	%	±%
Liberal Democrats	Dave Hough	394	44.7	
Conservative	Catherine Gibbard	278	31.6	
Reform	Sam Goggin	109	12.4	
Labour	Charlie Wilson	96	10.9	
Independent	Tal Belnik	4	0.5	
Majority		116	13.2	
Turnout		881		
Liberal Democrats gain from Conservative		Swing		
