= North East Derbyshire District Council elections =

Local government elections in Derbyshire, England

North East Derbyshire District Council elections are held every four years. North East Derbyshire District Council is the local authority for the non-metropolitan district of North East Derbyshire in Derbyshire, England. Since the last boundary changes in 2019, 53 councillors have been elected from 24 wards.

== Council elections ==
- 1973 North East Derbyshire District Council election
- 1976 North East Derbyshire District Council election
- 1979 North East Derbyshire District Council election (New ward boundaries)
- 1983 North East Derbyshire District Council election
- 1987 North East Derbyshire District Council election (District boundary changes took place but the number of seats remained the same)
- 1991 North East Derbyshire District Council election (District boundary changes took place but the number of seats remained the same)
- 1995 North East Derbyshire District Council election (District boundary changes took place but the number of seats remained the same)
- 1999 North East Derbyshire District Council election
- 2003 North East Derbyshire District Council election (New ward boundaries)
- 2007 North East Derbyshire District Council election
- 2011 North East Derbyshire District Council election
- 2015 North East Derbyshire District Council election
- 2019 North East Derbyshire District Council election (New ward boundaries)
- 2023 North East Derbyshire District Council election

== Council composition ==
Year	Labour	Conservative	Liberal Democrats	Green	Independent	Control
2003	36	8	5	0	4	Labour
2007	29	10	7	0	7	Labour
2011	34	17	0	0	2	Labour
2015	34	18	0	0	1	Labour
2019	18	30	3	0	2	Conservative
2023	28	19	3	1	2	Labour

== Results maps ==
2003 results map

2007 results map

2011 results map

2015 results map

2019 results map

2023 results map

== By-election results ==
=== 1995-1999 ===
Wingerworth By-Election 23 October 1997
Party	Candidate	Votes	%	±%
Conservative		444	51.7	+11.1
Labour		415	48.3	−11.1
Majority		29	3.4	
Turnout		859	15.2	
Conservative gain from Labour		Swing		

Barlow & Holmesfield By-Election 7 May 1998
Party	Candidate	Votes	%	±%
Conservative		314	52.9	+8.0
Labour		185	31.1	−1.0
Liberal Democrats		95	16.0	+16.0
Majority		129	21.8	
Turnout		594		
Conservative hold		Swing		

=== 1999-2003 ===
Dronfield North By-Election 27 September 2001
Party	Candidate	Votes	%	±%
Labour		462	55.4	−0.6
Liberal Democrats		221	26.5	+6.5
Conservative		151	18.1	−5.9
Majority		241	28.9	
Turnout		834	23.0	
Labour hold		Swing		

=== 2003-2007 ===
Brampton and Walton By-Election 12 August 2004
Party	Candidate	Votes	%	±%
Liberal Democrats	Kevin Moore	439	44.6	+44.6
Conservative		334	33.9	−31.8
Labour		212	21.5	−12.8
Majority		105	10.7	
Turnout		985	33.3	
Liberal Democrats gain from Conservative		Swing		

Clay Cross South By-Election 4 May 2006
Party	Candidate	Votes	%	±%
Labour		547	65.0	
Liberal Democrats	Julie Hirst	295	35.0	
Majority		252	30.0	
Turnout		842	32.0	
Labour hold		Swing		

=== 2007-2011 ===
Holmewood and Heath By-Election 10 April 2008
Party	Candidate	Votes	%	±%
Liberal Democrats	Jan Robinson	382	42.3	
Labour	Lee Stone	356	39.4	
Conservative	Derek Jason	165	18.3	
Majority		26	2.9	
Turnout		903	25.6	
Liberal Democrats gain from Labour		Swing		

Killamarsh West By-Election 3 July 2008
Party	Candidate	Votes	%	±%
Labour	Billy Rice	480	46.2	
Conservative	Gary Mason	342	32.9	
Independent	Maureen Potts	167	16.1	
Liberal Democrats	Terry Mcelligott	51	4.9	
Majority		138	13.3	
Turnout		1,040	24.0	
Labour hold		Swing		

Unstone By-Election 3 July 2008
Party	Candidate	Votes	%	±%
Liberal Democrats	Gordon Austin	169	31.2	+31.2
Conservative	Bob Taylor	160	29.6	+29.6
Labour	David Hill	146	27.0	−13.0
Independent	Kenneth Perkins	66	12.2	−47.8
Majority		9	1.6	
Turnout		541	38.3	
Liberal Democrats gain from Independent		Swing		

Holmewood and Heath By-Election 4 February 2010
Party	Candidate	Votes	%	±%
Labour	Lee Stone	373	64.1	
Conservative	Derek Jason	209	35.9	
Majority		164	28.2	
Turnout		582	21.5	
Labour gain from Liberal Democrats		Swing		

=== 2015-2019 ===
Grassmoor By-Election 15 February 2018
Party	Candidate	Votes	%	±%
Labour	Dick Marriot	459	48.9	−10.3
Conservative	Josh Broadhurst	368	39.2	+22.1
Liberal Democrats	Ben Marshall	111	11.9	+11.9
Majority		91	9.7	
Turnout		938	29.6	
Labour hold		Swing	-16.2	

=== 2019-2023 ===
Eckington South and Renishaw By-Election 6 May 2021
Party	Candidate	Votes	%	±%
Conservative	Philip Wheelhouse	657	51.6	+21.4
Labour	Clive Hunt	547	42.9	+1.7
Liberal Democrats	Alan Marshall	70	5.5	−4.1
Majority		110	8.6	
Turnout		1,274		
Conservative gain from Labour		Swing		

Killamarsh East By-Election 6 May 2021
Party	Candidate	Votes	%	±%
Conservative	David Drabble	519	56.4	+3.6
Labour	John Windle	359	39.0	−8.2
Liberal Democrats	Morgan Leggett	42	4.6	+4.6
Majority		160	17.4	
Turnout		920		
Conservative hold		Swing		

Killamarsh West By-Election 6 May 2021
Party	Candidate	Votes	%	±%
Conservative	Alex Platts	748	55.9	+1.9
Labour	Stuart Mullins	479	35.8	−10.2
Liberal Democrats	Mark Firth	111	8.3	+8.3
Majority		269	20.1	
Turnout		1,338		
Conservative hold		Swing		

Barlow and Holmesfield By-Election 9 September 2021
Party	Candidate	Votes	%	±%
Conservative	Bentley Strafford-Stephenson	294	69.0	+3.7
Labour	Ross Griffin	90	21.1	−0.4
Liberal Democrats	John Wilcock	42	9.9	−3.3
Majority		204	47.9	
Turnout		426		
Conservative hold		Swing		

Killamarsh East By-Election 9 September 2021
Party	Candidate	Votes	%	±%
Labour	Tony Lacey	291	49.9	+2.7
Conservative	Wendy Tinley	251	43.1	−9.7
Liberal Democrats	Mark Firth	41	7.0	+7.0
Majority		40	6.9	
Turnout		583		
Labour gain from Conservative		Swing		

Pilsley and Morton By-Election 28 July 2022
Party	Candidate	Votes	%	±%
Labour	Kevin Gillott	806	65.9	+34.6
Conservative	Dave Sankey	361	29.5	+14.4
Green	David Kesteven	34	2.8	+2.8
Liberal Democrats	Nadine Dart	22	1.8	−8.9
Majority		445	36.4	
Turnout		1,223		
Labour hold		Swing		

=== 2023-2027 ===
Clay Cross North By-Election 10 October 2024
Party	Candidate	Votes	%	±%
Conservative	Jess Stokes	624	51.0	+10.1
Labour	Emma Green	356	29.1	−21.3
Green	Ash Farrand	175	14.3	+14.3
Liberal Democrats	Leah Shafik	69	5.6	−3.1
Majority		268	21.9	
Turnout		1,224	22.1	
Conservative gain from Labour		Swing		

Eckington South and Renishaw By-Election 10 September 2026
Party	Candidate	Votes	%	±%
Reform	Jamie Hodgson	426	40.2	
Labour	David Landall	298	28.1	
Conservative	Philip Wheelhouse	229	21.6	
Independent	Jackie Foster	55	5.2	
Green	Hannah Court	52	4.9	
Majority		128	12.1	
Turnout		1,060		
Reform gain from Labour		Swing		
