= Forest Heath District Council elections =

Local government elections in Suffolk, England

Forest Heath District Council in Suffolk, England was elected every four years. between the last boundary changes in 2003 and the final elections in 2015, 27 councillors were elected from 14 wards. The council was abolished in 2019, with the area becoming part of West Suffolk.

== Political control ==
From the first election to the council in 1973 until its abolition in 2019, political control of the council was held by the following parties:

Party in control	Years
Conservative	1973–1976
No overall control	1976–1979
Conservative	1979–1983
No overall control	1983–1987
Conservative	1987–1991
No overall control	1991–1999
Conservative	1999–2019

=== Leadership ===
The leaders of the council from 1995 until 2019 were:

Councillor	Party	From	To
Adrian Rogers	Liberal Democrats	May 1995	May 1997
Paul Dwane	Labour	5 Jun 1997	9 May 1999
Geoffrey Jaggard	Conservative	1999	2011
James Waters	Conservative	2011	31 Mar 2019

James Waters served as leader of the West Suffolk shadow authority for part of the year prior to the new council coming into effect in 2019, but he was unsuccessful in securing a seat at the first election to the new council.

== Council elections ==
Composition of the council
Year	Conservative	Labour	Liberal Democrats (Note: Includes totals for the predecessors of the Liberal Democrats, the Liberal Party and SDP (both of which participated in the Alliance).)	UKIP	Independents & Others	Council control after election
Local government reorganisation; council established (25 seats)
1973	13	0	0	–	12	Conservative
1976	12	0	1	–	12	No overall control
New ward boundaries (25 seats)
1979	15	0	0	–	10	Conservative
1983	12	2	0	–	11	No overall control
1987	14	0	0	–	11	Conservative
1991	12	1	3	–	9	No overall control
1995	10	4	6	0	5	No overall control
1999	21	1	2	0	1	Conservative
New ward boundaries (27 seats)
2003	21	0	0	0	6	Conservative
2007	22	0	2	0	3	Conservative
2011	23	1	2	0	1	Conservative
2015	21	0	0	2	4	Conservative
Council abolished; merged into West Suffolk District Council

== Results maps ==
2003 results map

2007 results map

2011 results map

2015 results map

== By-election results ==
=== 1995-1999 ===
The Rows By-Election 6 March 1997
Party	Candidate	Votes	%	±%
Independent		273	38.7	
Conservative		245	34.7	
Labour		188	26.6	
Majority		28	4.0	
Turnout		706	27.3	
Independent hold		Swing		

St Marys By-Election 24 September 1998
Party	Candidate	Votes	%	±%
Conservative		444	58.6	+13.6
Labour		272	35.9	−3.5
Liberal Democrats		42	5.5	−10.1
Majority		172	22.7	
Turnout		758	25.3	
Conservative hold		Swing		

=== 2003-2007 ===
Manor By-Election 28 October 2004
Party	Candidate	Votes	%	±%
Conservative	Susan Syvret	269	66.9	+41.0
Independent		133	33.1	−10.1
Majority		136	33.8	
Turnout		402	32.8	
Conservative gain from Independent		Swing		

South By-Election 5 May 2005
Party	Candidate	Votes	%	±%
Conservative	Roger Dicker	564	59.7	
Independent	Brian Gray	381	40.3	
Majority		183	19.4	
Turnout		945	75.9	
Conservative hold		Swing		

Red Lodge By-Election 15 December 2005
Party	Candidate	Votes	%	±%
Liberal Democrats	Julie Middleton	173	55.3	+55.3
Conservative	Stuart Hastings	111	35.5	−20.3
UKIP	David Whitear	29	9.3	+9.3
Majority		62	19.8	
Turnout		313	26.0	
Liberal Democrats gain from Conservative		Swing		

=== 2007-2011 ===
Manor By-Election 22 November 2007
Party	Candidate	Votes	%	±%
Liberal Democrats	Timothy Huggan	281	53.6	
Conservative	Brian Harvey	211	40.3	
UKIP	David Chandler	32	6.1	
Majority		70	13.3	
Turnout		524	41.3	
Liberal Democrats gain from Conservative		Swing		

Red Lodge By-Election 5 June 2008
Party	Candidate	Votes	%	±%
Liberal Democrats	Albert McCloud	321	55.9	
Conservative	Alnoor Hirji	230	40.1	
UKIP	David Chandler	23	4.0	
Majority		91	15.8	
Turnout		574	38.0	
Liberal Democrats gain from Conservative		Swing		

Eriswell & the Rows By-Election 22 October 2009
Party	Candidate	Votes	%	±%
Conservative	James Waters	400	45.8	−24.4
Liberal Democrats	John Smith	346	39.6	+39.6
UKIP	David Chandler	128	14.6	−15.2
Majority		54	6.2	
Turnout		874		
Conservative hold		Swing		

=== 2011-2015 ===
Exning By-Election 11 July 2013
Party	Candidate	Votes	%	±%
Independent	Simon Cole	263	64.1	+64.1
Conservative	Marion Fairman-Smith	147	35.9	−8.0
Majority		116	28.2	
Turnout		410		
Independent gain from Liberal Democrats		Swing		

Market By-Election 19 December 2013
Party	Candidate	Votes	%	±%
Conservative	John Bloodworth	266	50.3	−19.9
UKIP	David Chandler	263	49.7	+49.7
Majority		3	0.6	
Turnout		529		
Conservative hold		Swing		

=== 2015-2019 ===
Brandon West By-Election 5 May 2016
Party	Candidate	Votes	%	±%
WSI	Victor Lukaniuk	220	29.0	−15.4
UKIP	Ian Smith	197	26.0	+26.0
Independent	Edward Stewart	180	23.7	+23.7
Conservative	Anthony Simmons	161	21.2	−34.4
Majority		23	3.0	
Turnout		758		
WSI gain from Conservative		Swing		

South By-Election 5 May 2016
Party	Candidate	Votes	%	±%
UKIP	Roger Dicker	334	51.9	+51.9
Conservative	Karen Soons	309	48.1	−17.8
Majority		25	3.8	
Turnout		643		
UKIP gain from Conservative		Swing		

St Mary's By-Election 17 August 2017
Party	Candidate	Votes	%	±%
Conservative	Robert Nobbs	338	50.1	+10.7
Labour	Michael Jefferys	276	40.9	+8.8
Green	Alice Haylock	60	8.9	+8.9
Majority		62	9.2	
Turnout		674		
Conservative hold		Swing		
