= 2015 Bromsgrove District Council election =

2015 UK local government election

Map of the results

The 2015 Bromsgrove District Council election took place on 7 May 2015 to elect members of the Bromsgrove Council in England. It was held on the same day as other local elections and the 2015 United Kingdom general election.

== Ward results ==
=== Alvechurch South ===
Alvechurch South
Party	Candidate	Votes	%	±%
Conservative	June Griffiths	1,152	73.5	
UKIP	Elizabeth Irving	416	26.5	
Majority		736	46.9	
Turnout		1,723	74.2	

=== Alvechurch Village ===
Alvechurch Village
Party	Candidate	Votes	%	±%
Conservative	Roger Smith	746	45.6	
UKIP	Dean Palethorpe	464	28.4	
Green	Fenella Brown	426	26.0	
Majority		282	17.2	
Turnout		1,658	72.7	

=== Aston Fields ===
Aston Fields
Party	Candidate	Votes	%	±%
Conservative	Philip Thomas	928	51.7	
Labour Co-op	Rory Shannon	628	35.0	
Green	Marcus Draper	239	13.3	
Majority		300	16.7	
Turnout		1,807	71.4	

=== Avoncroft ===
Avoncroft
Party	Candidate	Votes	%	±%
Conservative	Malcolm Glass	862	50.2	
Independent	John Ellis	447	26.0	
Labour	Mariam Garibyan	409	23.8	
Majority		415	24.2	
Turnout		1,736	70.4	

=== Barnt Green & Hopwood ===
Barnt Green & Hopwood
Party	Candidate	Votes	%	±%
Independent	Charles Hotham	1,066	62.6	
Conservative	Michael Webb	637	37.4	
Majority		429	25.2	
Turnout		1,729	75.1	

=== Belbroughton & Romsley ===
Belbroughton & Romsley
Party	Candidate	Votes	%	±%
Conservative	Margaret Sherrey	2,133	35.5	
Conservative	Christopher Allen-Jones	1,874	31.2	
Independent	Stanley Francis	706	11.8	
Independent	Alec Syrotiuk	657	10.9	
Labour	Jacqueline Smith	636	10.6	
Majority				
Turnout		3,883	74.0	

=== Bromsgrove Central ===
Bromsgrove Central
Party	Candidate	Votes	%	±%
Conservative	Rita Dent	1,010	57.6	
Labour	Thomas Stanley	743	42.4	
Majority		267	15.2	
Turnout		1,777	74.1	

=== Catshill North ===
Catshill North
Party	Candidate	Votes	%	±%
Conservative	Helen Jones	683	49.4	
Labour	Glenys Blackmoor	568	41.1	
Green	Julian Gray	131	9.5	
Majority		115	8.3	
Turnout		1,406	61.8	

=== Catshill South ===
Catshill South
Party	Candidate	Votes	%	±%
Conservative	Shirley Webb	830	57.6	
Labour	Bernard McEldowney	610	42.4	
Majority		220	15.3	
Turnout		1,464	66.6	

=== Charford ===
Charford
Party	Candidate	Votes	%	±%
Labour Co-op	Sean Shannon	616	45.8	
UKIP	Anita Hill	384	28.5	
Conservative	Mary Marsh	346	25.7	
Majority		232	17.2	
Turnout		1,352	56.7	

=== Cofton ===
Cofton
Party	Candidate	Votes	%	±%
Conservative	Richard Deeming	956	57.8	
Labour	Alan Cooper	382	23.1	
Green	Gillian Harvey	316	19.1	
Majority		574	34.7	
Turnout		1,670	79.6	

=== Drakes Cross ===
Drakes Cross
Party	Candidate	Votes	%	±%
Wythall Residents' Association	Susan Baxter	925	57.4	
Conservative	Roy Clarke	686	42.6	
Majority		239	14.8	
Turnout		1,633	64.3	

=== Hagley East ===
Hagley East
Party	Candidate	Votes	%	±%
Independent	Rachel Jenkins	942	61.6	
Conservative	Keith Grant-Pearce	588	38.4	
Majority		354	23.1	
Turnout		1,542	74.3	

=== Hagley West ===
Hagley West
Party	Candidate	Votes	%	±%
Independent	Steven Colella	1,349	65.8	
Conservative	William Moore	700	34.2	
Majority		649	31.7	
Turnout		2,072	75.8	

=== Hill Top ===
Hill Top
Party	Candidate	Votes	%	±%
Labour Co-op	Luke Mallett	904	69.2	
Conservative	Mark Hodder	402	30.8	
Majority		502	38.4	
Turnout		1,322	73.4	

=== Hollywood ===
Hollywood
Party	Candidate	Votes	%	±%
Wythall Residents' Association	Stephen Peters	876	50.1	
Conservative	Mark Bullivant	872	49.9	
Majority		4	0.2	
Turnout		1,766	72.4	

=== Lickey Hills ===
Lickey Hills
Party	Candidate	Votes	%	±%
Conservative	Christopher Taylor	1,015	57.6	
Liberal Democrats	Janet King	746	42.4	
Majority		269	15.3	
Turnout		1,799	78.4	

=== Lowes Hill ===
Lowes Hill
Party	Candidate	Votes	%	±%
Conservative	Rodney Laight	1,000	56.2	
Labour	Jeremy Morris	778	43.8	
Majority		222	12.5	
Turnout		1,800	69.0	

=== Marlbrook ===
Marlbrook
Party	Candidate	Votes	%	±%
Conservative	Brian Cooper	1,148	62.3	
Labour	Martin Knight	444	24.1	
Green	Peter Harvey	251	13.6	
Majority		704	38.2	
Turnout		1,865	76.0	

=== Norton ===
Norton
Party	Candidate	Votes	%	±%
Conservative	Peter Lammas	943	59.8	
Labour	Edward Murray	467	29.6	
Green	Michelle Baker	166	10.5	
Majority		476	30.2	
Turnout		1,587	75.5	

=== Perryfields ===
Perryfields
Party	Candidate	Votes	%	±%
Conservative	Karen May	603	58.1	
Labour	Michael Ball	323	31.1	
Independent	Brian Lewis	111	10.7	
Majority		280	27.0	
Turnout		1,043	71.8	

=== Rock Hill ===
Rock Hill
Party	Candidate	Votes	%	±%
Labour	Michael Thompson	724	45.9	
Conservative	Del Booth	702	44.5	
Liberal Democrats	Michael Mihailovic	151	9.6	
Majority		22	1.4	
Turnout		1,609	65.0	

=== Rubery North ===
Rubery North
Party	Candidate	Votes	%	±%
Labour	Peter McDonald	1,133	64.2	
Conservative	Claire Jones	631	35.8	
Majority		502	28.5	
Turnout		1,783	69.0	

=== Rubery South ===
Rubery South
Party	Candidate	Votes	%	±%
Labour	Christine McDonald	1,017	56.9	
Conservative	Allan Venables	770	43.1	
Majority		247	13.8	
Turnout		1,831	70.1	

=== Sanders Park ===
Sanders Park
Party	Candidate	Votes	%	±%
Labour	Margaret Buxton	944	54.0	
Conservative	Edward Tibby	804	46.0	
Majority		140	8.0	
Turnout		1,784	64.1	

=== Sidemoor ===
Sidemoor
Party	Candidate	Votes	%	±%
Labour	Christopher Bloore	809	49.9	
Conservative	Penelope Power	450	27.7	
UKIP	Adrian Smart	363	22.4	
Majority		359	22.1	
Turnout		1,637	62.7	

=== Slideslow ===
Slideslow
Party	Candidate	Votes	%	±%
Conservative	Caroline Spencer	1,326	65.8	
Labour	Philip Baker	430	21.4	
Liberal Democrats	Joseph Hearn	132	6.6	
Green	Mark Smith	126	6.3	
Majority		896	44.5	
Turnout		2,022	75.3	

=== Tardebigge ===
Tardebigge
Party	Candidate	Votes	%	±%
Conservative	Peter Whittaker	982	60.6	
Labour	Rosalind Cooke	247	15.2	
UKIP	George Flynn	226	14.0	
Green	Derrick Baker	165	10.2	
Majority		735	45.4	
Turnout		1,632	74.2	

=== Wythall East ===
Wythall East
Party	Candidate	Votes	%	±%
Wythall Residents' Association	Leslie Turner	1,028	60.6	
Conservative	Patricia Harrison	667	39.4	
Majority		361	21.3	
Turnout		1,718	71.8	

=== Wythall West ===
Wythall West
Party	Candidate	Votes	%	±%
Conservative	Geoffrey Denaro	613	40.4	
Wythall Residents' Association	Helen Cleaver	499	32.9	
UKIP	Barry Thornton	277	18.3	
Liberal Democrats	Sandra Docker	127	8.4	
Majority		114	7.5	
Turnout		1,535	68.8	
