= 2019 Surrey Heath Borough Council election =

2019 UK local government election

- 2 May 2019

All 35 seats to Surrey Heath Borough Council 18 seats needed for a majority

	First party	Second party	Third party
Leader	Richard Brooks
Party	Conservative	Liberal Democrats	Independent
Leader since	27 February 2019
Last election	36 seats, 68.6%	1 seat, 13.4%
Seats won	18	10	4
Seat change	▼18	▲9	▲2
Popular vote	24,395	14,830	5,443
Percentage	46.8%	28.4%	10.4%
	Fourth party	Fifth party	Sixth party
Party	Green	Labour	UKIP
Last election	0 seats, 2.0%	1 seat, 8.4%	0 seats, 2.8%
Seats won	2	1	0
Seat change	▲2	Steady	Steady
Popular vote	2,551	3,129	1,604
Percentage	4.9%	6.0%	3.1%
	Seventh party
Party	Pirate
Last election	New party
Seats won	0
Popular vote	190
Percentage	0.4%
- Winner of each seat at the 2019 Surrey Heath Borough Council election
Leader before election
Richard Brooks
Conservative
Leader after election
Richard Brooks
Conservative

The 2019 Surrey Heath Borough Council election took place on 2 May 2019 to elect all members of Surrey Heath Borough Council in England. The elections were held on new boundaries. The Conservatives narrowly held on to control of the council, winning 18 of the 35 seats, a majority of one, down from a majority of fifteen before the election.

== Summary ==
=== Election result ===
2019 Surrey Heath Borough Council election
Party	Candidates	Seats	Gains	Losses	Net gain/loss	Seats %	Votes %	Votes	+/−
Conservative	35	18	N/A	N/A	▼18	51.4	46.8	24,395	–21.8
Liberal Democrats	21	10	N/A	N/A	▲9	28.6	28.4	14,830	+15.0
Independent	5	4	N/A	N/A	▲2	11.4	10.4	5,443	+7.9
Green	3	2	N/A	N/A	▲2	5.7	4.9	2,551	+2.9
Labour	9	1	N/A	N/A	Steady	2.9	6.0	3,129	–2.4
UKIP	6	0	N/A	N/A	Steady	0.0	3.1	1,604	+0.3
Pirate	1	0	N/A	N/A	Steady	0.0	0.4	190	N/A

== Results by ward ==
=== Bagshot ===
Bagshot (3 seats)
Party	Candidate	Votes	%	±%
Liberal Democrats	Sam Kay	1,031	51.6	
Liberal Democrats	Tim Fitzgerald	886	44.4	
Conservative	Valerie White	852	42.7	
Liberal Democrats	Lance Spencer	795	39.8	
Conservative	Katia Malcaus Cooper	767	38.4	
Conservative	Colin Manley	679	34.0	
UKIP	Stephen West	255	12.8	
Majority		57		
Turnout		2,015	36.0	
Liberal Democrats win (new seat)				
Liberal Democrats win (new seat)				
Conservative win (new seat)				

=== Bisley and West End ===
Bisley and West End (3 seats)
Party	Candidate	Votes	%	±%
Conservative	Adrian Page	922	46.6	
Conservative	David Mansfield	857	43.3	
Independent	Graham Alleway	841	42.5	
Conservative	Nic Price	792	40.0	
Liberal Democrats	Julie Hoad	457	23.1	
Liberal Democrats	Martin Alexander	411	20.8	
Liberal Democrats	Huw Evans	332	16.8	
UKIP	Stephen McClelland	245	12.4	
Labour	Mick Sheehan	182	9.2	
Majority		55		
Turnout		1,987	31.0	
Conservative win (new seat)				
Conservative win (new seat)				
Independent win (new seat)				

=== Frimley ===
Frimley (2 seats)
Party	Candidate	Votes	%	±%
Conservative	Sarah Croke	853	69.6	
Conservative	Darryl Ratiram	820	66.9	
Labour	Julian Woodward	306	25.0	
Labour	Jefferson Nwokeoma	294	24.0	
Majority		514		
Turnout		1,271	33.0	
Conservative win (new seat)				
Conservative win (new seat)				

=== Frimley Green ===
Frimley Green (3 seats)
Party	Candidate	Votes	%	±%
Liberal Democrats	Benjamin Leach	1,019	54.7	
Liberal Democrats	Cliff Betton	1,012	54.4	
Liberal Democrats	Sashi Mylvaganam	889	47.7	
Conservative	Bruce Mansell	601	32.3	
Conservative	Max Nelson	568	30.5	
Conservative	Attieh Fard	519	27.9	
UKIP	Jonathan Wong	269	14.4	
Pirate	Gavin Crump	190	10.2	
Majority		288		
Turnout		1,879	36.0	
Liberal Democrats win (new seat)				
Liberal Democrats win (new seat)				
Liberal Democrats win (new seat)				

=== Heatherside ===
Heatherside (3 seats)
Party	Candidate	Votes	%	±%
Liberal Democrats	Graham Tapper	1,261	53.1	
Liberal Democrats	John Skipper	1,143	48.1	
Liberal Democrats	Kristian Wrenn	1,075	45.2	
Conservative	Paul Ilnicki	926	39.0	
Conservative	Ian Cullen	855	36.0	
Conservative	Jonathan Lytle	761	32.0	
UKIP	Hazel Prowse	357	15.0	
Majority		149		
Turnout		2,395	42.0	
Liberal Democrats win (new seat)				
Liberal Democrats win (new seat)				
Liberal Democrats win (new seat)				

=== Lightwater ===
Lightwater (3 seats)
Party	Candidate	Votes	%	±%
Green	Sharon Galliford	1,019	54.0	
Conservative	Rebecca Jennings-Evans	833	44.1	
Green	Peter Barnett	770	40.8	
Green	Andrew Willgoss	762	40.4	
Conservative	Jarmila Halovsky-Yu	741	39.3	
Conservative	John Winterton	723	38.3	
UKIP	Peter Appleford	278	14.7	
Majority		8		
Turnout		1,898	35.0	
Green win (new seat)				
Conservative win (new seat)				
Green win (new seat)				

=== Mytchett and Deepcut ===
Mytchett and Deepcut (3 seats)
Party	Candidate	Votes	%	±%
Conservative	Paul Deach	971	51.9	
Liberal Democrats	Helen Whitcroft	835	44.6	
Liberal Democrats	Morgan Rise	761	40.7	
Liberal Democrats	Jacques Olmo	760	40.6	
Conservative	Craig Fennell	616	32.9	
Conservative	Joanne Potter	603	32.2	
UKIP	Damien Heads	298	15.9	
Majority		1		
Turnout		1,886	36.0	
Conservative win (new seat)				
Liberal Democrats win (new seat)				
Liberal Democrats win (new seat)				

=== Old Dean ===
Old Dean (2 seats)
Party	Candidate	Votes	%	±%
Labour	Rodney Bates	474	50.2	
Conservative	Shaun Garrett	455	48.2	
Conservative	Trefor Hogg	446	47.2	
Labour	Murray Rowlands	386	40.9	
Majority		9		
Turnout		968	25.0	
Labour win (new seat)				
Conservative win (new seat)				

=== Parkside ===
Parkside (2 seats)
Party	Candidate	Votes	%	±%
Conservative	Edward Hawkins	729	57.4	
Conservative	Josephine Hawkins	690	54.3	
Liberal Democrats	Cindy Ferguson	435	34.3	
Liberal Democrats	Chris Tew	325	25.6	
UKIP	Tony Cable	200	15.7	
Majority		255		
Turnout		1,279	33.0	
Conservative win (new seat)				
Conservative win (new seat)				

=== St Michael's ===
St Michael's (2 seats)
Party	Candidate	Votes	%	±%
Conservative	Colin Dougan	583	57.9	
Conservative	Alan McClafferty	538	53.4	
Labour	Richard Claridge	392	38.9	
Labour	Jill Coles	392	38.9	
Majority		146		
Turnout		1,045	24.0	
Conservative win (new seat)				
Conservative win (new seat)				

=== St Paul's ===
St Paul's (2 seats)
Party	Candidate	Votes	%	±%
Conservative	Vivienne Chapman	802	67.5	
Conservative	Dan Adams	745	62.7	
Liberal Democrats	Fiona Karimjee	377	31.7	
Liberal Democrats	Miriam Spencer	327	27.5	
Majority		368		
Turnout		1,212	31.0	
Conservative win (new seat)				
Conservative win (new seat)				

=== Town ===
Town (2 seats)
Party	Candidate	Votes	%	±%
Conservative	Richard Brooks	534	58.4	
Conservative	Robin Perry	494	54.0	
Liberal Democrats	Richard Coe	373	40.8	
Liberal Democrats	Vijaya Ramdas	326	35.7	
Majority		121		
Turnout		947	25.0	
Conservative win (new seat)				
Conservative win (new seat)				

=== Watchetts ===
Watchetts (2 seats)
Party	Candidate	Votes	%	±%
Conservative	Charlotte Morley	664	61.2	
Conservative	David Lewis	650	59.9	
Labour	Alexandra Dalwood	379	34.9	
Labour	Joseph Lord	324	29.9	
Majority		271		
Turnout		1,136	28.0	
Conservative win (new seat)				
Conservative win (new seat)				

=== Windlesham and Chobham ===
Windlesham and Chobham (3 seats)
Party	Candidate	Votes	%	±%
Independent	Victoria Wheeler	1,482	64.7	
Independent	Pat Tedder	1,426	62.2	
Independent	Emma McGrath	1,213	52.9	
Conservative	Mike Goodman	701	30.6	
Conservative	Alex Green	574	25.1	
Conservative	Alexander Hanney	522	22.8	
Independent	Alison Hook	481	21.0	
Majority		512		
Turnout		2,309	42.0	
Independent win (new seat)				
Independent win (new seat)				
Independent win (new seat)				

== Changes 2019–2023 ==
=== By-elections ===
==== Bagshot ====
Bagshot: 6 May 2021
Party	Candidate	Votes	%	±%
Conservative	Mark Gordon	1,225	54.1	
Liberal Democrats	Richard Wilson	1,038	45.9	
Majority		187	8.2	
Registered electors		5,321		
Turnout		2,297	43.2	
Rejected ballots		34	1.5	
Conservative gain from Liberal Democrats		Swing		

The by-election was triggered by the death of Liberal Democrat councillor Sam Kay.

==== Frimley Green ====
Frimley Green: 14 October 2021
Party	Candidate	Votes	%	±%
Conservative	Stuart Black	896	48.3	▲16
Liberal Democrats	Jacques Olmo	877	47.3	▼0.4
Labour	Christine Richards	76	4.1	
Majority		19	1.0	▼14.4
Registered electors		5,195		
Turnout		1,852	35.7	
Rejected ballots		3	0.2	
Conservative gain from Liberal Democrats		Swing		

The by-election was triggered by the resignation of Liberal Democrat councillor Benjamin Leach.

==== Bisley and West End ====
Bisley and West End: 14 April 2022
Party	Candidate	Votes	%	±%
Liberal Democrats	Liz Noble	1,286	66.2	▲43.1
Conservative	Tony Henderson	662	33.8	▼6.2
Majority		624	31.9	▲14.4
Registered electors		6,909		
Turnout		1,956	28.3	▼2.7
Rejected ballots		8	0.4	
Liberal Democrats gain from Conservative		Swing	24.65	

The by-election was triggered by the resignation of Conservative councillor David Mansfield.
