= 2011 Taunton Deane Borough Council election =

2011 UK local government election

Map of the results of the 2011 Taunton Deane Borough Council election. Conservatives in blue, Liberal Democrats in yellow, Labour in red and independents in grey.

The 2011 Taunton Deane Borough Council election took place on 5 May 2011 to elect members of Taunton Deane Borough Council in Somerset, England. The whole council was up for election and the council stayed under no overall control. The Conservatives won 28 seats, exactly half, while the Liberal Democrats took 23. Labour only won three seats, with the two remaining held by independent candidates. Falling only one seat short of an overall majority, the Conservatives took on the leadership of the council as a minority administration, under Councillor John Williams.

After the 2007 elections, the council was under no overall control, with the Conservatives having 26 seats, the Liberal Democrats 25 and the five remaining seats shared between Labour and Independent councillors. Four subsequent by-elections were all held by the incumbent party.

== Results ==
Seats held:
1. Conservative Party, 28 50 (50.0%)
2. Liberal Democrats, 23 41.1 (41.1%)
3. Labour Party, 3 5.4 (5.39%)
4. Independents, 2 3.6 (3.60%)

Taunton Deane Borough Council Election result: 2011
Party	Seats	Gains	Losses	Net gain/loss	Seats %	Votes %	Votes	+/−
Conservative	28	2	0	+2	50.0	43.9	33,634	
Liberal Democrats	23	2	4	–2	41.1	37.2	28,465	
Labour	3	2	0	+2	5.4	12.3	9,428	
Independent	2	0	2	–2	3.6	4.7	3,622	
Green	0	0	0	0	0	1.9	1,427	
