= 2015 North East Derbyshire District Council election =

2015 UK local government election

The 2015 North East Derbyshire District Council election took place on 7 May 2015 to elect members of the North East Derbyshire District Council in England. It was held on the same day as other local elections.
