= Folkestone and Hythe District Council elections =

Local government elections in Kent, England

Folkestone and Hythe District Council is the local authority for the Folkestone and Hythe District in Kent, England. The district was called Shepway prior to 2018. The council is elected every four years. Since the last boundary changes in 2015, 30 councillors have been elected from 13 wards.

== Seat composition ==
Year	Conservative	Labour	Liberal Democrats (Note: Includes totals for the predecessors of the Liberal Democrats, the Liberal Party and SDP (both of which participated in the Alliance).)	Green	UKIP	Independents & Others	Council control after election
Local government reorganisation; council established (54 seats)
1973	33	12	1	–	–	8	Conservative
1976	33	9	4	0	–	8	Conservative
New ward boundaries (56 seats)
1979	35	7	6	0	–	8	Conservative
1983	31	2	17	0	–	6	Conservative
1987	26	0	27	0	–	3	No overall control
1991	18	3	33	0	–	2	Liberal Democrats
1995	19	13	21	0	0	3	No overall control
1999	30	13	13	0	0	0	Conservative
New ward boundaries (46 seats)
2003	16	1	29	0	0	0	Liberal Democrats
2007	34	0	10	0	0	2 (Note: 2 People First Party)	Conservative
2011	44	0	0	0	0	2	Conservative
New ward boundaries (30 seats)
2015	22	1	0	0	7	0	Conservative
2019	13	6	2	6	2	1	No overall control
2023	5	10	2	11	0	2	No overall control

== Results maps ==
2003 results map

2007 results map

2011 results map

2015 results map

2019 results map

2023 results map

== By-election results ==
=== 1995-1999 ===
St Mary in the Marsh By-Election 22 August 1996
Party	Candidate	Votes	%	±%
Labour		593	47.9	
Conservative		429	34.7	
Liberal Democrats		215	17.4	
Majority		164	13.2	
Turnout		1,237	54.8	
Labour hold		Swing		

Folkestone Central By-Election 4 September 1997
Party	Candidate	Votes	%	±%
Labour		278	42.2	+12.2
Conservative		222	33.7	+5.1
Liberal Democrats		158	24.0	−17.1
Majority		56	8.5	
Turnout		658	20.8	
Labour gain from Liberal Democrats		Swing		

=== 1999-2003 ===
Harbour By-Election 22 February 2001
Party	Candidate	Votes	%	±%
Liberal Democrats		387	43.0	+8.2
Labour		273	30.4	−14.3
Conservative		239	26.6	+6.1
Majority		114	12.6	
Turnout		899	26.5	
Liberal Democrats gain from Labour		Swing		

Hythe North By-Election 22 February 2001
Party	Candidate	Votes	%	±%
Conservative		480	51.9	−12.6
Liberal Democrats		369	39.9	+17.0
Labour		75	8.1	−4.5
Majority		111	12.0	
Turnout		924	38.6	
Conservative hold		Swing		

Morehall By-Election 22 February 2001
Party	Candidate	Votes	%	±%
Liberal Democrats	Gary George	424	36.3	+0.5
Conservative	Dick Pascoe	407	34.8	+4.0
Labour		339	29.0	−4.5
Majority		17	1.5	
Turnout		1,170	32.7	
Liberal Democrats gain from Labour		Swing		

Hawkinge and Paddlesworth By-Election 5 April 2001
Party	Candidate	Votes	%	±%
Liberal Democrats	Peter Smith	598	57.0	+57.0
Conservative		451	43.0	−27.8
Majority		147	14.0	
Turnout		1,049	34.7	
Liberal Democrats gain from Conservative		Swing		

Folkestone Central By-Election 7 February 2002
Party	Candidate	Votes	%	±%
Conservative	Hugh Barker	358	61.5	+25.7
Labour		224	38.5	+0.7
Majority		134	23.0	
Turnout		582	19.6	
Conservative hold		Swing		

Folkestone Park By-Election 27 June 2002
Party	Candidate	Votes	%	±%
Liberal Democrats		1,003	58.3	+14.8
Conservative	Edwina Boyt	653	37.9	−5.6
Labour		65	3.8	−9.3
Majority		350	20.4	
Turnout		1,721	36.1	
Liberal Democrats hold		Swing		

St Mary's in the Marsh By-Election 24 October 2002
Party	Candidate	Votes	%	±%
Liberal Democrats	Julie White	401	37.4	+17.4
Conservative		365	34.0	−1.6
Labour		262	24.4	+0.0
UKIP		44	4.1	+4.1
Majority		36	3.4	
Turnout		1,072	46.5	
Liberal Democrats gain from Labour		Swing		

=== 2003-2007 ===
New Romney Coast By-Election 2 October 2003
Party	Candidate	Votes	%	±%
Liberal Democrats	Ann Birchmore	550	48.1	+15.4
Conservative	Derek Morgan	502	43.9	−9.5
Labour	Albert Ryder	91	8.0	−5.9
Majority		48	4.2	
Turnout		1,143	41.8	
Liberal Democrats gain from Conservative		Swing		

Romney Marsh By-Election 2 October 2003
Party	Candidate	Votes	%	±%
Conservative	Simon Ashworth	349	50.6	−5.6
Liberal Democrats	Sylvia Oiller	273	39.6	+15.3
Labour	Adrian Cirket	68	9.9	−9.6
Majority		76	11.0	
Turnout		690	40.7	
Conservative hold		Swing		

Folkestone East By-Election 22 April 2004
Party	Candidate	Votes	%	±%
Conservative		575	52.5	+33.9
Liberal Democrats		352	32.1	−30.9
Labour		169	15.4	−3.0
Majority		223	20.4	
Turnout		1,096	37.0	
Conservative gain from Liberal Democrats		Swing		

New Romney Town By-Election 29 September 2005
Party	Candidate	Votes	%	±%
Conservative	David Stephenson	560	66.2	+19.0
Labour		175	20.7	−18.1
Liberal Democrats		111	13.1	−0.8
Majority		385	45.5	
Turnout		846	33.5	
Conservative gain from Labour		Swing		

Folkestone Harvey Central By-Election 13 October 2005
Party	Candidate	Votes	%	±%
Conservative	Philip Martin	409	53.4	+16.7
Labour		237	30.9	+8.5
Liberal Democrats		120	15.7	−21.8
Majority		172	22.5	
Turnout		766	23.7	
Conservative gain from Green		Swing		

=== 2007-2011 ===
Hythe West By-Election 4 June 2009
Party	Candidate	Votes	%	±%
Liberal Democrats	Neil Matthews	589	39.6	+22.1
Conservative	Paul Peacock	483	32.5	−26.4
UKIP	Barbara Johnson	255	17.2	+5.9
BNP	Harry Williams	94	6.3	+6.3
Shepway Independents	Colin Tearle	65	4.4	+4.4
Majority		106	7.1	
Turnout		1,486	46.1	
Liberal Democrats gain from Conservative		Swing		

Romney Marsh By-Election 4 June 2009
Party	Candidate	Votes	%	±%
Conservative	Toby Clifton-Holt	430	58.7	−10.3
Shepway Independents	Graham Snell	121	16.5	+16.5
Liberal Democrats	Sally Matthews	114	15.6	−0.9
Labour	Douglas Suckling	68	9.3	−5.3
Majority		309	42.2	
Turnout		733	41.0	
Conservative hold		Swing		

New Romney Coast By-Election 12 November 2009
Party	Candidate	Votes	%	±%
Conservative	Shane Lawrence	452	51.4	+2.2
Liberal Democrats	Brian Wright	333	37.9	−12.9
UKIP	Wendy Nevard	94	10.7	+10.7
Majority		119	13.5	
Turnout		879	30.7	
Conservative hold		Swing		

Lydd By-Election 10 February 2011
Party	Candidate	Votes	%	±%
Conservative	Tony Hills	591	49.3	−0.8
Labour	Donald Russell	247	20.6	+20.6
Liberal Democrats	Ted Last	184	15.3	−7.7
Independent	Rochelle Saunders	177	14.8	+14.8
Majority		344	28.7	
Turnout		1,199		
Conservative hold		Swing		

=== 2011-2015 ===
Folkestone Park By-Election 29 November 2012
Party	Candidate	Votes	%	±%
Liberal Democrats	Lynne Beaumont	461	36.2	+12.2
Conservative	Leo Griggs	320	25.1	−15.7
People First Party	Patricia Copping	200	15.7	+1.5
UKIP	Hod Birkby	153	12.0	+2.8
Labour	Nicola Keen	111	8.7	+8.7
Green	Derek Moran	29	2.3	+2.3
Majority		141	11.1	
Turnout		1,274		
Liberal Democrats gain from Conservative		Swing		

Folkestone Harvey Central By-Election 4 September 2014
Party	Candidate	Votes	%	±%
UKIP	David Callahan	287	27.9	+27.9
Conservative	Rodica Wheeler	224	21.7	−17.4
Liberal Democrats	Tom McNeice	198	19.2	+2.3
Labour	Wendy Mitchell	196	19.0	−9.1
Green	David Horton	96	9.3	+9.3
TUSC	Seth Cruse	29	2.8	+2.8
Majority		63	6.1	
Turnout		1,030		
UKIP gain from Conservative		Swing		

Folkestone Harvey West By-Election 23 October 2014
Party	Candidate	Votes	%	±%
Conservative	Helen Barker	385	36.4	−18.8
UKIP	Stephen Jardine	293	27.7	+27.7
Liberal Democrats	Hugh Robertson-Ritchie	262	24.8	+3.4
Green	Jasmine Heywood	61	5.8	+5.8
Labour	Nicola Keen	57	5.4	−18.0
Majority		92	8.7	
Turnout		1,058		
Conservative hold		Swing		

=== 2015-2019 ===
New Romney By-Election 20 July 2017
Party	Candidate	Votes	%	±%
Conservative	Russell Tillson	566	35.4	+6.4
Labour	John Cramp	523	32.7	+21.7
Independent	David Wimble	431	27.0	+27.0
Liberal Democrats	Val Loseby	77	4.8	−3.7
Majority		43	2.7	
Turnout		1,597		
Conservative hold		Swing		

=== 2023-2027 ===
Romney Marsh By-Election 22 February 2024
Party	Candidate	Votes	%	±%
Conservative	Tony Hills	375	24.2	−7.4
Green	Malcolm Watkinson	332	21.4	+3.9
Labour	Chrissie Cooper	295	19.0	−4.5
Reform	Kim Wye	237	15.3	+15.3
Independent	Paul Peacock	155	10.0	+10.0
Independent	Dave Evans	62	4.0	+4.0
Independent	Ian Meyers	51	3.3	−18.8
No description	Dougie Young	31	2.0	−0.9
Liberal Democrats	Matt Horrox	11	0.7	−7.2
Majority		43	2.8	
Turnout		1,555	26.5	−7.9
Conservative hold		Swing		
