= Forest of Dean District Council elections =

Local government elections in Gloucestershire, England

Forest of Dean District Council is the local authority for the Forest of Dean in Gloucestershire, England. The council is elected every four years. Since the last boundary changes in 2019, 38 councillors are elected from 21 wards.

== Election results ==
Composition of the council
Year	Conservative	Labour	Liberal Democrats (Note: Includes totals for the predecessors of the Liberal Democrats, the Liberal Party and SDP (both of which participated in the Alliance).)	Green (Note: Includes totals for the predecessors of the Green Party of England and Wales, the Ecology Party and Green Party UK.)	UKIP	Independents & Others	Council control after election
Local government reorganisation; council established (47 seats)
1973	0	21	1	–	–	25	Independent
1976	4	17	3	0	–	23	No overall control
1979	4	20	2	0	–	21	No overall control
New ward boundaries (49 seats)
1983	4	22	5	0	–	18	No overall control
1987	7	13	9	0	–	20	No overall control
1991	3	25	6	0	–	15	Labour
1995	1	30	5	0	0	13	Labour
1999	1	30	6	0	0	12	Labour
New ward boundaries (48 seats)
2003	17	16	4	0	0	11	No overall control
2007	30	8	2	0	0	8	Conservative
2011	19	17	1	0	0	11	No overall control
2015	21	13	0	1	7	6	No overall control
New ward boundaries (38 seats)
2019	10	5	0	6	0	14	No overall control
2023	4	5	3	15	0	11	No overall control

== Results maps ==
2003 results map

2007 results map

2011 results map

2015 results map

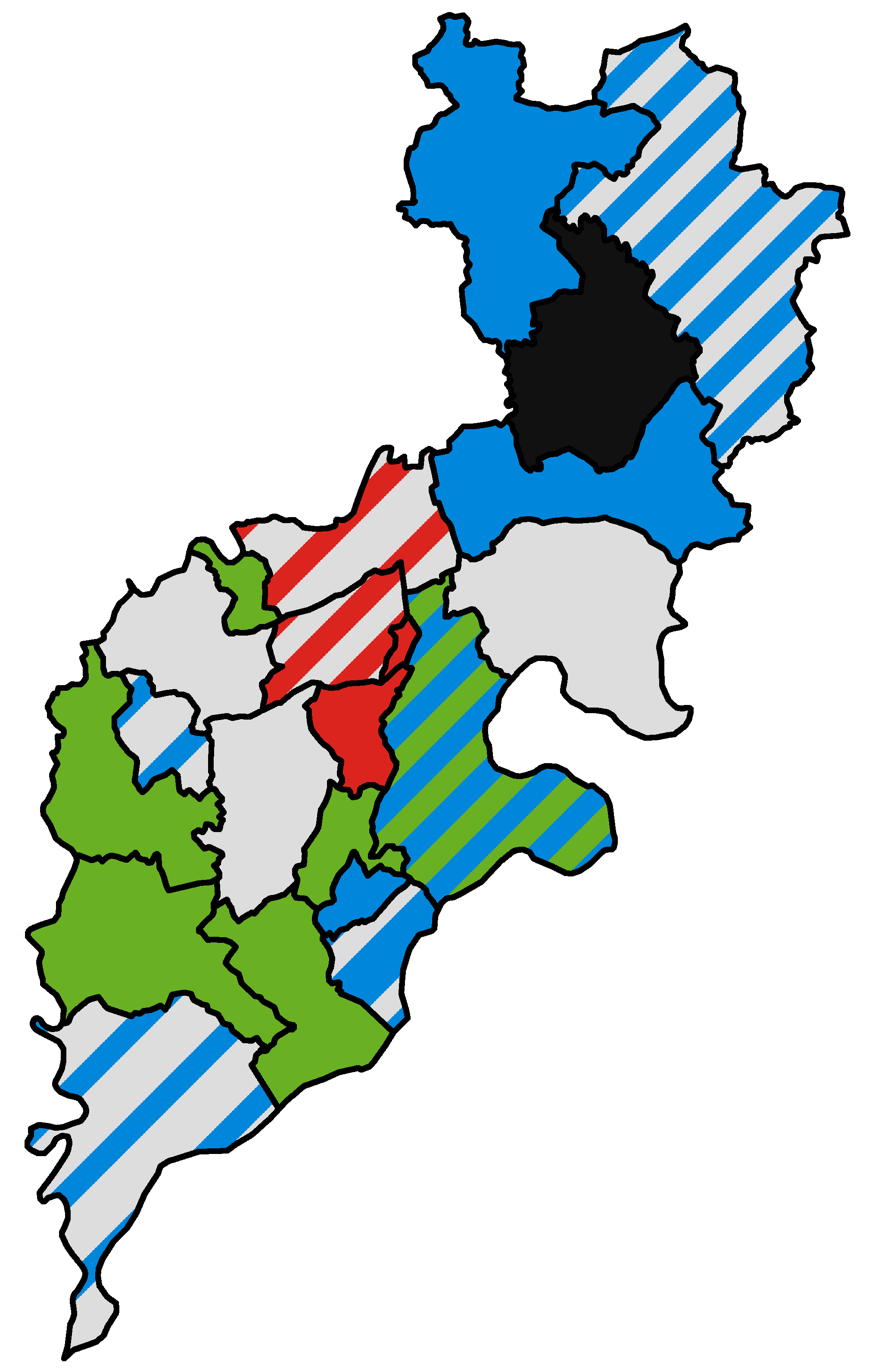
2019 results map

2023 results map

== By-election results ==
=== 1995–1999 ===
Newnham By-Election 29 August 1996
Party	Candidate	Votes	%	±%
Labour		185	50.8	
Conservative		179	49.2	
Majority		6	1.6	
Turnout		364	35.1	
Labour hold		Swing		

Bream By-Election 16 October 1997
Party	Candidate	Votes	%	±%
Labour		422	86.5	+15.2
Conservative		66	13.5	+13.5
Majority		356	73.0	
Turnout		488	17.0	
Labour hold		Swing		

=== 1999–2003 ===
Broadwell By-Election 18 May 2000
Party	Candidate	Votes	%	±%
Labour		368	46.6	
Conservative		201	25.4	
Liberal Democrats		112	14.2	
Independent		109	13.8	
Majority		167	21.2	
Turnout		790	40.7	
Labour hold		Swing		

Newnham By-Election 7 June 2001
Party	Candidate	Votes	%	±%
Conservative		267	36.6	−3.4
Labour		242	33.2	−8.5
Liberal Democrats	John Holman	221	30.3	+11.9
Majority		25	3.4	
Turnout		730		
Conservative gain from Labour		Swing		

=== 2003–2007 ===
Lydney East By-Election 5 February 2004
Party	Candidate	Votes	%	±%
Conservative	James Bevan	785	62.9	+35.8
Labour	Albert Stapleton	366	29.3	−7.6
Liberal Democrats	Leslie Holman	98	7.8	+7.8
Majority		419	33.6	
Turnout		1,249	32.8	
Conservative gain from Labour		Swing		

Hartpury By-Election 4 August 2005
Party	Candidate	Votes	%	±%
Conservative	Tracey Hunt	288	50.3	
Independent	Philip Burford	262	45.8	
Labour	Bruce Hogan	22	3.8	
Majority		26	4.5	
Turnout		572		
Conservative hold		Swing		

Awre By-Election 20 October 2005
Party	Candidate	Votes	%	±%
Labour	Jay Waller	239	52.4	+7.8
Conservative	Raymond Puttock	217	47.6	−7.8
Majority		22	4.8	
Turnout		456	32.0	
Labour gain from Conservative		Swing		

Mitcheldean and Drybrook By-Election 20 October 2005
Party	Candidate	Votes	%	±%
Labour	Bruce Hogan	286	29.0	+8.0
Conservative	Brian Robinson	259	26.2	+2.4
Liberal Democrats	Andrew Baker	252	25.5	+4.4
Independent	Colin Smith	156	15.8	−18.3
Independent	Roger Sterry	34	3.4	+3.4
Majority		27	2.8	
Turnout		987	29.0	
Labour gain from Conservative		Swing		

Christchurch & English Bicknor By-Election 4 May 2006
Party	Candidate	Votes	%	±%
Conservative	Marrilyn Smart	365	55.2	+5.0
Labour	Barten Venner	156	23.6	−6.0
Liberal Democrats	David Wheeler	140	21.2	+1.0
Majority		209	31.6	
Turnout		661	51.0	
Conservative hold		Swing		

=== 2007–2011 ===
Newent Central By-Election 15 January 2009
Party	Candidate	Votes	%	±%
Conservative	Len Lawton	306	49.2	+6.5
Independent	Edward Wood	166	26.7	−13.5
Labour	Cherry Burrow	96	15.4	−1.7
Independent	Stephen Tweedie	54	8.7	+8.7
Majority		140	22.5	
Turnout		622	22.0	
Conservative hold		Swing		

Mitcheldean and Drybrook By-Election 20 August 2009
Party	Candidate	Votes	%	±%
Liberal Democrats	Sue Henchley	638	55.1	+36.2
Independent	Tony Pickthall	239	20.6	−18.2
Conservative	Brian Jones	195	16.8	−5.8
Labour	Helen Stewart	86	7.4	−12.1
Majority		399	34.5	
Turnout		1,158	32.4	
Liberal Democrats gain from Independent		Swing		

Coleford East By-Election 19 November 2009
Party	Candidate	Votes	%	±%
Independent	Mike Meredith-Edwards	267	29.8	+1.2
Liberal Democrats	Heather Lusty	230	25.7	+25.7
Conservative	David Cooksley	210	23.5	−17.7
Labour	Paul Kay	188	21.0	−9.2
Majority		37	4.1	
Turnout		895	21.0	
Independent gain from Conservative		Swing		

=== 2011–2015 ===
Cinderford West By-Election 12 January 2012
Party	Candidate	Votes	%	±%
Labour	Roger Sterry	496		
Conservative	Aaron Freeman	236		
UKIP	Colin Guyton	119		
Liberal Democrats	Colin Davies	89		
Majority		260		
Turnout				
Labour hold		Swing		

Berry Hill By-Election 7 February 2013
Party	Candidate	Votes	%	±%
Labour	Timothy Brian Gwilliam	276	59.7	+4.6
Conservative	Nigel John Bluett	102	21.9	−23.0
UKIP	John Duncan William McOwan	85	18.4	+18.4
Majority		174		
Turnout				
Labour hold		Swing		

Bromesberrow and Dymock By-Election 2 May 2013
Party	Candidate	Votes	%	±%
UKIP	Simon Roberts	308	54.3	+54.3
Conservative	Mike Rees	259	45.7	−7.5
Majority		49	8.6	
Turnout		567		
UKIP gain from Conservative		Swing		

Coleford East By-Election 26 September 2013
Party	Candidate	Votes	%	±%
Labour	Tanya Palmer	289	37.2	+1.9
UKIP	Alan Grant	227	29.3	+29.3
Conservative	Harry Ives	104	13.4	−10.3
Liberal Democrats	Heather Lusty	80	10.3	−5.6
Independent	Keith Aburrow	76	9.8	+9.8
Majority		62	8.0	
Turnout		776		
Labour hold		Swing		

Redmarley By-Election 26 September 2013
Party	Candidate	Votes	%	±%
Conservative	Clayton Williams	332	65.5	−14.5
UKIP	Alex Tritton	119	23.5	+23.5
Labour	Andy Hewlett	56	11.0	−9.0
Majority		213	42.0	
Turnout		507		
Conservative hold		Swing		

Newnham and Westbury By-Election 23 October 2014
Party	Candidate	Votes	%	±%
Independent	Simon Phelps	321	38.5	+38.5
Conservative	Richard Boyles	216	25.9	−4.9
UKIP	Peter Foster	102	12.2	+12.2
Labour	Jenny Shaw	100	12.0	−1.0
Green	Sid Phelps	70	8.4	−7.7
Liberal Democrats	Ian King	25	3.0	+3.0
Majority		105	12.6	
Turnout		834		
Independent hold		Swing		

=== 2015–2019 ===
Lydbrook and Ruardean By-Election 16 February 2017
Party	Candidate	Votes	%	±%
Green	Sid Phelps	360	35.3	+27.9
Conservative	Kevin White	248	24.3	+6.2
Labour	Karen Brown	231	22.7	−2.0
UKIP	Roy Bardo	113	11.1	−12.2
Liberal Democrats	Heather Lusty	67	6.6	+6.6
Majority		112	11.0	
Turnout			25.8	
Green gain from UKIP		Swing		

=== 2019–2023 ===
Berry Hill By-Election 6 May 2021
Party	Candidate	Votes	%	±%
Independent	Jamie Elsmore	561	40.7	+40.7
Conservative	Terry Hale	400	29.0	+4.4
Green	Melanie Getgood	199	14.4	−5.0
Labour	Matt Bishop	185	13.4	+13.4
Liberal Democrats	John Taylerson	33	2.4	+2.4
Majority		161	11.7	
Turnout		1,378		
Independent hold		Swing		

Cinderford East By-Election 6 May 2021
Party	Candidate	Votes	%	±%
Labour	Shaun Stammers	362	39.5	−13.0
Conservative	Carol Thomas	319	34.8	+15.1
Green	Carl Picton	152	16.6	+16.6
Independent	Jeremy Charlton-Wright	83	9.1	−18.7
Majority		43	4.7	
Turnout		916		
Labour hold		Swing		

=== 2023–2027 ===
Cinderford East By-Election 1 May 2025
Party	Candidate	Votes	%	±%
Reform	Stuart Graham	480	44.4	
Labour	Emma Louise Phillips	344	31.8	
Conservative	Pamela Kay Plummer	112	10.4	
Independent	Jeremy Paul Charlton-Wright	74	6.8	
Independent	Tom Forester	71	6.6	
Majority		136	12.6	
Turnout		1,086	31.7	
Reform gain from Labour				

Newent and Taynton By-Election 1 May 2025
Party	Candidate	Votes	%	±%
Conservative	Jonathan Edward Beeston	704	38.7	
Liberal Democrats	Tony Clifford-Winters	561	30.8	
Green	Tim Rickard	430	23.6	
Labour	Graham David Mountcastle	124	6.8	
Majority		143	7.9	
Turnout		1,887	33.3	
Conservative gain from Liberal Democrats				
