= 2015 East Lindsey District Council election =

2015 UK local government election

Results of the 2015 East Lindsey District Council election

The 2015 East Lindsey District Council election took place on 7 May 2015 to elect members of East Lindsey District Council in England. This was on the same day as other local elections. The Conservative Party won overall control of the council from NOC.

== Results ==
East Lindsey District Council Election Result 2015
Party	Seats	Gains	Losses	Net gain/loss	Seats %	Votes %	Votes	+/−
Conservative	33	N/A	N/A	N/A	60.00	41.40	36,498	
UKIP	8	N/A	N/A	N/A	14.55	23.66	20,857	
Independent	6	N/A	N/A	N/A	10.91	7.03	6,200	
Labour	4	N/A	N/A	N/A	7.27	17.07	15,049	
Lincolnshire Independent	3	N/A	N/A	N/A	5.46	4.97	4,379	
Liberal Democrats	1	N/A	N/A	N/A	1.81	2.06	1,814	
No Label	0	N/A	N/A	N/A	0.00	1.53	1,350	
Green	0	N/A	N/A	N/A	0.00	1.28	1,128	
Independence from Europe	0	N/A	N/A	N/A	0.00	1.00	881	

== Council composition ==
After the election, the composition of the council was:

↓
33	8	6	4	3	1
Conservative	UKIP	IND	Lab	LI	LD

IND - Independent
Lab - Labour
LI - Lincolnshire Independents
LD - Liberal Democrats

== Ward results ==
Source -

=== Alford ===
Alford (2 seats)
Party	Candidate	Votes	%	±%
Conservative	Graham Anthony Marsh	1,057	45.55	
Lincolnshire Independent	Sarah Caroline Devereux	775	20.65	
Conservative	Colin Matthews	652		
Labour	Daniel Paul Hopwood	628	26.23	
Labour	Sharon Margaret Wilkinson	356		
Green	Andrew Gareth Hill	284	7.57	
Turnout			61.57	
Conservative win (new seat)				
Lincolnshire Independent win (new seat)				

A total of 18 ballots were rejected.

=== Binbrook ===
Binbrook (1 seat)
Party	Candidate	Votes	%	±%
Conservative	Richard Geoffrey Fry	964	72.00	
Labour	Andrew David Charles Austin	375	28.00	
Majority		589	44.00	
Turnout		1,339	68.66	
Conservative win (new seat)				

A total of 19 ballots were rejected.

=== Burgh Le Marsh ===
Burgh Le Marsh (1 seat)
Party	Candidate	Votes	%	±%
Conservative	Neil Douglas Luther Cooper	582	45.90	
UKIP	James William Brookes	414	32.65	
Independent	David Poole	272	21.45	
Majority		168	13.25	
Turnout		1,268	63.90	
Conservative win (new seat)				

A total of 23 ballots were rejected.

=== Chapel St Leonards ===
Chapel St Leonards (2 seat)
Party	Candidate	Votes	%	±%
Conservative	Paul Anthony Hibbert-Greaves	843	45.23	
Conservative	Melvin Leivers	778		
Labour	Fiona Mary Brown	770	36.13	
Independent	Hazel Newcombe	668	18.64	
Labour	David George Smart	525		
Turnout			58.03	
Conservative win (new seat)				
Conservative win (new seat)				

A total of 13 ballots were rejected.

=== Coningsby & Mareham ===
Coningsby & Mareham (3 seats)
Party	Candidate	Votes	%	±%
Conservative	Stanley Morris Avison	2,392	38.62	
UKIP	Aimee Anne Flitcroft	1,546	42.37	
Independent	Martin John Foster	1,177	19.01	
UKIP	Julia Pears	1,078		
Turnout			63.07	
Conservative win (new seat)				
UKIP win (new seat)				
Independent win (new seat)				

A total of 45 ballots were rejected.

=== Croft ===
Croft (1 seat)
Party	Candidate	Votes	%	±%
Conservative	Pauline May Cooper	738	67.52	
Independence from Europe	Valerie Pain	355	32.48	
Majority		383	35.04	
Turnout		1,093	63.58	
Conservative win (new seat)				

A total of 39 ballots were rejected.

=== Friskney ===
Friskney (1 seat)
Party	Candidate	Votes	%	±%
UKIP	Carleen Dickinson	531	50.48	
Conservative	Kevin Stephen Smith	521	49.52	
Majority		10	0.96	
Turnout		1,052	63.75	
UKIP win (new seat)				

A total of 35 ballots were rejected.

=== Fulstow ===
Fulstow (1 seat)
Party	Candidate	Votes	%	±%
Conservative	David Michael Buckley	847	61.33	
UKIP	Iris Dainton	298	21.58	
Labour	Jason Paul Garrett-Pughe	236	17.09	
Majority		549	39.75	
Turnout		1,381	73.54	
Conservative win (new seat)				

A total of 17 ballots were rejected.

=== Grimoldby ===
Grimoldby (1 seat)
Party	Candidate	Votes	%	±%
Independent	Terence John Knowles	611	52.13	
Conservative	Helena Poskitt	275	23.46	
UKIP	Arthur Henderson	172	14.68	
Labour	Dawn Margaret Blakey	114	9.73	
Majority		336	28.67	
Turnout		1,172	67.87	
Independent win (new seat)				

A total of 9 ballots were rejected.

=== Hagworthingham ===
Hagworthingham (1 seat)
Party	Candidate	Votes	%	±%
Conservative	William Grover	864	68.19	
UKIP	Leslie James Pears	403	31.81	
Majority		461	36.38	
Turnout		1,267	71.43	
Conservative win (new seat)				

A total of 63 ballots were rejected.

=== Halton Holegate ===
Halton Holegate (1 seat)
Party	Candidate	Votes	%	±%
Independent	James Macaulay Swanson	583	41.23	
Conservative	Thomas James Kemp	434	30.69	
UKIP	Marian Elizabeth Raven	353	24.97	
Independence from Europe	John James Barry	44	3.11	
Majority		149	10.54	
Turnout		1,414	70.21	
Independent win (new seat)				

A total of 23 ballots were rejected.

=== Holton Le Clay & North Thoresby ===
Holton Le Clay & North Thoresby (2 seats)
Party	Candidate	Votes	%	±%
Conservative	Siobhan Louise Weller	1,727	47.56	
Lincolnshire Independent	Terence Frederick Aldridge	1,225	33.74	
Labour	Michael Robert Booth	679	18.70	
Turnout			67.81	
Conservative win (new seat)				
Lincolnshire Independent win (new seat)				

A total of 37 ballots were rejected.

=== Horncastle ===
Horncastle (3 seats)
Party	Candidate	Votes	%	±%
Conservative	Richard Martin Avison	1,843	28.58	
Liberal Democrats	Fiona Margaret Martin	1,663	25.79	
Independent	Sandra Campbell-Wardman	1,125	17.45	
UKIP	Michael John Beecham	1,042	16.16	
Labour	Janet Frances Lister	775	12.02	
Turnout			66.09	
Conservative win (new seat)				
Liberal Democrats win (new seat)				
Independent win (new seat)				

A total of 20 ballots were rejected.

=== Ingoldmells ===
Ingoldmells (1 seat)
Party	Candidate	Votes	%	±%
Conservative	Colin John Davie	365	41.43	
UKIP	Christopher Garton	273	30.99	
Labour	Graham Archer	235	26.67	
Independence from Europe	Katie Leeann Owen	8	0.91	
Majority		92	10.44	
Turnout		881	60.14	
Conservative win (new seat)				

A total of 7 ballots were rejected.

=== Legbourne ===
Legbourne (1 seat)
Party	Candidate	Votes	%	±%
Conservative	Adam Grist	894	73.64	
UKIP	Charles Frederick Wilson	320	26.36	
Majority		574	47.28	
Turnout		1,214	71.00	
Conservative win (new seat)				

A total of 61 ballots were rejected.

=== Mabelthorpe ===
Mabelthorpe (3 seats)
Party	Candidate	Votes	%	±%
UKIP	Terence Brindley Brown	1,313	35.45	
Labour	Graham Edward Cullen	1,234	36.81	
Labour	Anthony John Howard	1,158		
UKIP	Annie Elizabeth Reynolds	1,017		
Labour	Patrick Kevin Prince	965		
UKIP	Christopher Reynolds	903		
Conservative	Grama Michael Gooding	852	20.67	
Conservative	Moira Jessie Morgan	539		
Conservative	Carl Ian Tebbutt	494		
Lincolnshire Independent	David Barry Mellor	257	4.48	
Liberal Democrats	Keith Pinion	151		
Independent	Graham Dexter Parkhurst	125	1.37	
No Label	Stephanie Jane Carruthers	111	1.22	
Turnout			60.51	
UKIP win (new seat)				
Labour win (new seat)				
Labour win (new seat)				

A total of 9 ballots were rejected.

=== Marsh Chapel & Somercotes ===
Marsh Chapel & Somercotes (2 seats)
Party	Candidate	Votes	%	±%
Conservative	Robert John Palmer	1,299	45.07	
UKIP	Daniel McNally	1,094	37.96	
Labour	Patricia Jane Newman	489	16.97	
Turnout			66.05	
Conservative win (new seat)				
UKIP win (new seat)				

A total of 6 ballots were rejected.

=== North Holme ===
North Holme (1 seat)
Party	Candidate	Votes	%	±%
Conservative	Francis William Patrick Treanor	523	52.94	
Labour	David James Ernest Hall	465	47.06	
Majority		58	5.88	
Turnout		988	55.90	
Conservative win (new seat)				

A total of 26 ballots were rejected.

=== Priory & St James ===
Priory & St James (2 seats)
Party	Candidate	Votes	%	±%
Labour	Sarah Rosemary Dodds	1,089	54.46	
Conservative	Pauline Frances Watson	902	27.19	
Labour	Stuart Pickering	718		
No Label	Andrew Leonard	609	18.35	
Turnout			60.44	
Labour win (new seat)				
Conservative win (new seat)				

A total of 51 ballots were rejected.

=== Roughton ===
Roughton (1 seat)
Party	Candidate	Votes	%	±%
Conservative	William Gray	Unopposed		
Conservative win (new seat)				

=== Scarbrough & Seacroft ===
Scarbrough & Seacroft (3 seats)
Party	Candidate	Votes	%	±%
Conservative	Stephen Russell Kirk	1,205	39.28	
Conservative	David Richard Edginton	1,198		
UKIP	John Barry Byford	1,029	45.29	
UKIP	Darrell Blackburn	941		
Labour	Gwendolen Margaret Gray	853	13.94	
UKIP	David John Cargill	801		
Independence from Europe	Robert Milory Sloan	91	1.48	
Turnout			55.05	
Conservative win (new seat)				
Conservative win (new seat)				
UKIP win (new seat)				

A total of 31 ballots were rejected.

=== Sibsey & Stickney ===
Sibsey & Stickney (2 seats)
Party	Candidate	Votes	%	±%
Conservative	Thomas Robert Ashton	1,269	55.94	
Conservative	Neil John Jones	1,173		
UKIP	Jonathan Noble	919	41.54	
UKIP	Tracy Frances Lamy-Edwards	894		
Independence from Europe	Giles Allen Crust	110	2.52	
Turnout			68.08	
Conservative win (new seat)				
Conservative win (new seat)				

A total of 128 ballots were rejected.

=== Spilsby ===
Spilsby (1 seat)
Party	Candidate	Votes	%	±%
Conservative	Roderick Vincent Williams	538	44.76	
UKIP	Ebony Kate Moore	367	30.53	
Labour	Christopher Clech Prince	297	24.71	
Majority		171	14.23	
Turnout		1,202	56.76	
Conservative win (new seat)				

A total of 8 ballots were rejected.

=== St Clements ===
St Clements (2 seats)
Party	Candidate	Votes	%	±%
UKIP	Mark Vincent Dannatt	704	40.58	
Conservative	Sidney Alfred Dennis	573	35.08	
UKIP	Christina Draper	550		
Conservative	James Anthony Carpenter	511		
Labour	Barry Cresswell	375	12.14	
Independent	Mark Crawford Anderson	350	11.33	
Independence from Europe	Malcolm Keen	27	0.87	
Turnout			53.64	
UKIP win (new seat)				
Conservative win (new seat)				

A total of 34 ballots were rejected.

=== St Margarets ===
St Margarets (1 seat)
Party	Candidate	Votes	%	±%
Conservative	Christopher Thomas Green	481	42.23	
Labour	Laure Marie Stephenson	403	35.38	
Independent	Eileen Ballard	255	22.39	
Majority		78	6.85	
Turnout		1,139	65.02	
Conservative win (new seat)				

A total of 19 ballots were rejected.

=== St Marys ===
St Marys (1 seat)
Party	Candidate	Votes	%	±%
Independent	Gillian Mary Makinson-Sanders	714	58.29	
Conservative	Victoria Emma Treanor	344	28.08	
Labour	Michael Bateson	167	13.63	
Majority		370	30.21	
Turnout		1,225	66.49	
Independent win (new seat)				

A total of 7 ballots were rejected.

=== St Michaels ===
St Michaels (1 seat)
Party	Candidate	Votes	%	±%
Independent	George Edward Horton	490	44.67	
Conservative	Daniel Mark Turner	384	35.00	
Labour	Neil Andrew Ward	223	20.33	
Majority		106	9.67	
Turnout		1,097	67.19	
Independent win (new seat)				

A total of 19 ballots were rejected.

=== Sutton on Sea ===
Sutton on Sea (2 seats)
Party	Candidate	Votes	%	±%
Lincolnshire Independent	Stephen Leslie William Palmer	953	36.52	
Conservative	Helen Angela Matthews	800	31.52	
UKIP	John Peter Critchlow	757	16.30	
Lincolnshire Independent	Anthony David John Mee	743		
Conservative	Helen Parkhurst	664		
Labour	Josephine Philomena Alderson	429	15.66	
Labour	Keith Finney	298		
Turnout			68.82	
Lincolnshire Independent win (new seat)				
Conservative win (new seat)				

A total of 3 ballots were rejected.

=== Tetford & Donington ===
Tetford & Donington (1 seat)
Party	Candidate	Votes	%	±%
Conservative	David George Andrews	480	33.66	
Lincolnshire Independent	Daniel Anthony Simpson	426	29.87	
Independent	Douglas Rodwell	270	28.94	
UKIP	Andrew Wyatt Truscott	250	17.53	
Majority		54	3.79	
Turnout		1,426	74.96	
Conservative win (new seat)				

A total of 14 ballots were rejected.

=== Tetney ===
Tetney (1 seat)
Party	Candidate	Votes	%	±%
Conservative	Stuart Watson	648	52.90	
No Label	Blair Keith Maynard	577	47.10	
Majority		71	5.80	
Turnout		1,225	58.56	
Conservative win (new seat)				

A total of 32 ballots were rejected.

=== Trinity ===
Trinity (1 seat)
Party	Candidate	Votes	%	±%
Labour	Rosalind Alice Jackson	361	39.03	
Conservative	Edward George Bell	234	25.30	
UKIP	Christopher Burton	195	21.08	
Independent	David Edmund Wing	82	8.86	
No Label	Owen Charles Nicholson	53	5.73	
Majority		127	13.73	
Turnout		925	52.46	
Labour win (new seat)				

A total of 0 ballots were rejected.

=== Wainfleet ===
Wainfleet (1 seat)
Party	Candidate	Votes	%	±%
Conservative	Wendy Bowkett	557	46.73	
UKIP	James Gary Edwards	291	24.41	
Labour	Robert Henry Caudwell	191	16.02	
Independence from Europe	Chris Pain	153	12.84	
Majority		266	22.32	
Turnout		1,192	59.46	
Conservative win (new seat)				

A total of 6 ballots were rejected.

=== Willoughby with Sloothby ===
Willoughby with Sloothby (1 seat)
Party	Candidate	Votes	%	±%
Conservative	Alan Vassar	591	44.74	
Independent	Stephen William Eyre	563	42.62	
Labour	Rae Rigby	167	12.64	
Majority		28	2.12	
Turnout		1,321	67.56	
Conservative win (new seat)				

A total of 13 ballots were rejected.

=== Winthorpe ===
Winthorpe (2 seats)
Party	Candidate	Votes	%	±%
UKIP	Daniel Brookes	990	60.97	
UKIP	Susan Anita Jane Blackburn	922		
Conservative	Carl Stuart Macey	786	25.06	
Green	Philip William Gaskell	345	11.00	
Independence from Europe	Neil Adrian Woods	93	2.97	
Turnout			53.57	
UKIP win (new seat)				
UKIP win (new seat)				

A total of 38 ballots were rejected.

=== Withern and Theddlethorpe ===
Withern and Theddlethorpe (1 seat)
Party	Candidate	Votes	%	±%
Conservative	Sandra Harrison	Unopposed		
Conservative win (new seat)				

=== Woodhall Spa ===
Woodhall Spa (2 seats)
Party	Candidate	Votes	%	±%
Conservative	Craig James Leyland	1,589	75.18	
Conservative	Susanna Philippa Helen Gorst	1,357		
Green	Harry Richard Wells	499	12.73	
Labour	Martin Roger Yeldham	474	12.09	
Turnout			69.73	
Conservative win (new seat)				
Conservative win (new seat)				

A total of 20 ballots were rejected.

=== Wragby ===
Wragby (1 seat)
Party	Candidate	Votes	%	±%
Conservative	Nicholas John Guyatt	731	55.67	
Independent	Philip John Grimes	582	44.33	
Majority		149	11.34	
Turnout		1,313	69.75	
Conservative win (new seat)				

A total of 49 ballots were rejected.
