= Bedfordshire County Council elections =

Local government elections in Bedfordshire, England

Bedfordshire County Council was elected every four years. Luton was administered by the county council until 1997, when it became a unitary authority. Bedfordshire County Council was abolished in 2009, when unitary councils were introduced across the rest of Bedfordshire. Services which prior to 2009 were provided by Bedfordshire County Council are now provided by either Bedford Borough Council or Central Bedfordshire Council.

== Results ==
The county council was created in 1889, with elections held every three years (except during the World Wars). Significant reforms in 1974 under the Local Government Act 1972 saw a new council elected in 1973 which took office from 1 April 1974 when those reforms came into effect. The election results (excluding by-elections) from 1973 until the council's abolition were as follows:

Year	Seats	Conservative	Labour	Liberal Democrats (Note: Includes Liberal Party and Social Democratic Party pre-1988.)	Independent / other	Notes
1973	83	32	39	9	3	
1977	83	75	5	2	1	
1981	83	40	34	8	1	
1985	73	30	29	14	0	New division boundaries.
1989	73	35	27	11	0	
1993	73	28	31	13	1	
1997	49	25	14	10	0	Luton removed from county council's area.
2001	49	26	13	10	0	
2005	52	36	7	9	0	New division boundaries.

== Council elections ==
- 1973 Bedfordshire County Council election
- 1977 Bedfordshire County Council election
- 1981 Bedfordshire County Council election
- 1985 Bedfordshire County Council election
- 1989 Bedfordshire County Council election
- 1993 Bedfordshire County Council election
- 1997 Bedfordshire County Council election
- 2001 Bedfordshire County Council election
- 2005 Bedfordshire County Council election (new division boundaries)

== Results maps ==
2005 results map

== By-election results ==
Maulden By-Election 22 January 1998
Party	Candidate	Votes	%	±%
Conservative		1,280	57.9	+3.2
Labour		673	30.4	+2.6
Liberal Democrats		259	11.7	−5.8
Majority		607	47.3	
Turnout		2,212	40.0	
Conservative hold		Swing		

Arlesley & Langford By-Election 9 September 1999
Party	Candidate	Votes	%	±%
Labour		681	47.8	−4.2
Conservative		411	28.8	−19.2
Independent		333	23.4	+23.4
Majority		270	19.0	
Turnout		1,425		
Labour hold		Swing		

North East Bedfordshire By-Election 7 November 2002
Party	Candidate	Votes	%	±%
Conservative	Tom Wootton	1,001	69.3	+11.4
Liberal Democrats		318	22.0	+6.9
Labour		84	5.8	−11.2
Green	Ben Foley	41	2.8	+2.8
Majority		683	47.3	
Turnout		1,444	23.5	
Conservative hold		Swing		

Plantation By-Election 18 March 2004
Party	Candidate	Votes	%	±%
Conservative		679	70.3	+20.7
Liberal Democrats		287	29.7	+13.2
Majority		392	40.6	
Turnout		966	20.1	
Conservative hold		Swing		
