= Stafford Borough Council elections =

Local government elections in Staffordshire, England

Stafford Borough Council elections are held every four years. Stafford Borough Council is the local authority for the non-metropolitan district of Stafford in Staffordshire, England. Since the last boundary changes in 2015, 40 councillors have been elected from 23 wards.

== Council elections ==
- 1973 Stafford Borough Council election
- 1976 Stafford Borough Council election
- 1979 Stafford Borough Council election (New ward boundaries)
- 1983 Stafford Borough Council election
- 1987 Stafford Borough Council election
- 1991 Stafford Borough Council election
- 1995 Stafford Borough Council election (Borough boundary changes took place but the number of seats remained the same)
- 1999 Stafford Borough Council election
- 2003 Stafford Borough Council election (New ward boundaries reduced the number of seats by one)
- 2007 Stafford Borough Council election
- 2011 Stafford Borough Council election
- 2015 Stafford Borough Council election (New ward boundaries)
- 2019 Stafford Borough Council election
- 2023 Stafford Borough Council election

== Results maps ==
2003 results map

2007 results map

2011 results map

2015 results map

2019 results map

2023 results map

== By-election results ==
=== 1995-1999 ===
Weeping Cross By-Election 28 November 1996
Party	Candidate	Votes	%	±%
Conservative		832	52.4	
Labour		537	33.8	
Liberal Democrats		215	13.7	
Majority		295	18.6	
Turnout		1,584	31.0	
Conservative hold		Swing		

=== 1999-2003 ===
Weeping Cross By-Election 30 March 2000
Party	Candidate	Votes	%	±%
Conservative		892	67.9	+0.4
Labour		269	20.5	−11.9
Liberal Democrats		152	11.6	+11.6
Majority		623	47.4	
Turnout		1,313	25.5	
Conservative hold		Swing		

Eccleshall By-Election 4 October 2001
Party	Candidate	Votes	%	±%
Conservative		661	66.3	+4.0
Liberal Democrats		336	33.7	−4.0
Majority		325	32.6	
Turnout		997	21.0	
Conservative hold		Swing		

Tillington By-Election 4 October 2001
Party	Candidate	Votes	%	±%
Labour		445	47.6	−2.6
Conservative		368	39.4	+10.4
UKIP		71	7.6	+7.6
Liberal Democrats		50	5.4	−9.4
Majority		78	8.2	
Turnout		934	26.0	
Labour hold		Swing		

Woodseaves By-Election 7 February 2002
Party	Candidate	Votes	%	±%
Conservative		336	77.1	
Liberal Democrats		65	14.9	
Labour		35	8.0	
Majority		271	62.2	
Turnout		436	27.1	
Conservative hold		Swing		

Forebridge By-Election 5 December 2002
Party	Candidate	Votes	%	±%
Liberal Democrats		310	49.8	−8.8
Labour		220	35.3	+7.4
Conservative		93	14.9	+1.4
Majority		90	14.5	
Turnout		623	32.2	
Liberal Democrats hold		Swing		

=== 2003-2007 ===
St. Michaels By-Election 3 February 2005
Party	Candidate	Votes	%	±%
Conservative	Geoffrey Collier	368	38.5	−2.3
Liberal Democrats	Peter Stevens	313	32.8	+7.8
Labour	Harry Brunt	252	26.4	−7.8
Independent	David Haswell	22	2.3	+2.3
Majority		55	5.7	
Turnout		955	27.7	
Conservative hold		Swing		

Fulford By-Election 13 July 2006
Party	Candidate	Votes	%	±%
Conservative	Peter Roycroft	unopposed		
Conservative hold		Swing		

=== 2007-2011 ===
Common By-Election 10 July 2008
Party	Candidate	Votes	%	±%
Conservative	Roy Barron	397	39.6	−4.3
Labour	Alexandra Gribbon	294	29.3	−26.8
Liberal Democrats	Martin Shapland	140	14.0	+14.0
E.P.P.	Paul Gilbert	78	7.8	+7.8
Green	Damon Hoppe	76	7.6	+7.6
Majority		103	10.3	
Turnout		985	37.5	
Conservative hold		Swing		

=== 2011-2015 ===
Walton By-Election 20 October 2011
Party	Candidate	Votes	%	±%
Independent	Jill Hood	569	45.7	+14.9
Conservative	John O'Leary	372	29.8	−12.2
Labour	Lloyd Brown	306	24.6	−2.7
Majority		197	15.8	
Turnout		1,247		
Independent gain from Conservative		Swing		

Rowley By-Election 8 March 2012
Party	Candidate	Votes	%	±%
Labour	Anne Hobbs	620	48.1	+10.1
Conservative	Violet Allan	540	41.9	−1.6
Green	Kate Harding	67	5.2	−5.9
UKIP	Malcolm Hurst	61	4.7	+4.7
Majority		80	6.2	
Turnout		1,288		
Labour gain from Conservative		Swing		

Coton By-Election 2 May 2013
Party	Candidate	Votes	%	±%
Labour	Sharon Hollinshead	448	64.1	−6.3
Conservative	Jonathan Price	251	35.9	+6.3
Majority		197	28.2	
Turnout		699		
Labour hold		Swing		

=== 2015-2019 ===
Highfields and Western Downs By-Election 4 May 2017
Party	Candidate	Votes	%	±%
Conservative	Victoria Jenkinson	650		
Conservative	William Taylor	620		
Labour	David Barron	602		
Labour	Mike Winkle	544		
Green	Toby Hollinshead	109		
Green	Doug Rouxel	97		
Conservative gain from Labour		Swing		
Conservative gain from Labour		Swing		

=== 2023-2027 ===
Manor By-Election 16 July 2026
Party	Candidate	Votes	%	±%
Labour	Aaron Thurstance	481	36.2	
Reform	Ray Barron	414	31.2	
Conservative	Freddie Crisp	237	17.8	
Green	Joe Tunnicliffe	197	14.8	
Majority		67	5.0	
Turnout		1,329		
Labour hold		Swing		
