= Chesterfield Borough Council elections =

Local government elections in Derbyshire, England

Chesterfield Borough Council elections are held every four years. Chesterfield Borough Council is the local authority for the non-metropolitan district of Chesterfield in Derbyshire, England. Since the last boundary changes in 2003, 48 councillors have been elected from 19 wards. However, the 2023 elections will be fought under new boundaries with the number of Councillors reducing from 48 to 40.

== Political control ==
Chesterfield was a municipal borough from 1836 until 1974. The borough was reformed under the Local Government Act 1972, gaining Staveley and Brimington and becoming a non-metropolitan district. The first election to the reformed council was held in 1973, initially operating as a shadow authority before coming into its powers on 1 April 1974. Since 1973 political control of the council has been held by the following parties:

Party in control	Years
Labour	1973–2003
Liberal Democrats	2003–2011
Labour	2011–present

=== Leadership ===
The leaders of the council since 2001 have been:

Councillor	Party	From	To
Bill Flanagan	Labour	May 1974	2001
John Burrows	Labour	2001	May 2003
Ray Russell	Liberal Democrats	May 2003	18 May 2011
John Burrows	Labour	18 May 2011	10 May 2017
Tricia Gilby	Labour	10 May 2017	

== Council elections ==
- 1973 Chesterfield Borough Council election
- 1976 Chesterfield Borough Council election
- 1979 Chesterfield Borough Council election (New ward boundaries)
- 1983 Chesterfield Borough Council election
- 1987 Chesterfield Borough Council election
- 1991 Chesterfield Borough Council election (Borough boundary changes took place but the number of seats remained the same)
- 1995 Chesterfield Borough Council election
- 1999 Chesterfield Borough Council election
- 2003 Chesterfield Borough Council election (New ward boundaries increased the number of seats by one)
- 2007 Chesterfield Borough Council election
- 2011 Chesterfield Borough Council election
- 2015 Chesterfield Borough Council election
- 2019 Chesterfield Borough Council election
- 2023 Chesterfield Borough Council election (New ward boundaries)

== Results maps ==
2003 results map

2007 results map

2011 results map

2015 results map

2019 results map

2023 results map

== By-election results ==
=== 1995-1999 ===
West By-Election 14 November 1996
Party	Candidate	Votes	%	±%
Liberal Democrats		809	48.3	
Conservative		545	32.5	
Labour		322	19.2	
Majority		264	15.8	
Turnout		1,676	44.6	
Liberal Democrats hold		Swing		

Holmbrook By-Election 10 April 1997
Party	Candidate	Votes	%	±%
Liberal Democrats		1,068	54.5	
Labour		812	41.5	
Conservative		78	4.0	
Majority		256	13.0	
Turnout		1,958	51.5	
Liberal Democrats gain from Labour		Swing		

=== 1999-2003 ===
New Whittington By-Election 15 March 2001
Party	Candidate	Votes	%	±%
Liberal Democrats		1,115	64.8	+3.1
Labour		569	33.1	−2.5
Conservative		37	2.1	−0.6
Majority		546	31.7	
Turnout		1,721	45.6	
Liberal Democrats hold		Swing		

=== 2003-2007 ===
Loundsley Green By-Election 22 April 2004
Party	Candidate	Votes	%	±%
Liberal Democrats	Jean Barr	895	65.8	+5.1
Labour	Thomas Murphy	431	31.6	−5.6
Conservative	Gary Hatton	36	2.6	+2.6
Majority		464	34.2	
Turnout		1,362	40.9	
Liberal Democrats hold		Swing		

=== 2007-2011 ===
Brimington South By-Election 6 May 2010
Party	Candidate	Votes	%	±%
Labour	John Haywood	1,500	47.9	+4.1
Liberal Democrats	Stephen Hartley	1,134	36.2	−12.6
Conservative	Gary Hatton	499	15.9	+8.5
Majority		366	11.7	
Turnout		3,133	65.3	
Labour gain from Liberal Democrats		Swing		

=== 2015-2019 ===
Moor By-Election 4 Oct 2018
Party	Candidate	Votes	%	±%
Liberal Democrats	Tony Rogers	532	47.1	+12.1
Labour	Ron Mihaly	445	39.4	−9.9
Conservative	Gordon Franklin Partington	84	7.4	−8.3
UKIP	Barry Thompson	69	6.1	6.1
Majority		87	7.7	
Turnout		1,130	31	
Liberal Democrats gain from Labour		Swing		

=== 2019-2023 ===
Hollingwood and Inkersall By-Election 7 July 2022
Party	Candidate	Votes	%	±%
Labour	Debbie Wheeldon	747	48.5	+15.2
Independent	Dean Rhodes	676	43.9	+43.9
Green	Louis Hollingworth	118	7.7	+7.7
Majority		71	4.6	
Turnout		1,541		
Labour gain from Independent		Swing		

=== 2023-2027 ===
Spire By-Election 4 July 2024
Party	Candidate	Votes	%	±%
Labour	Sharon Blank	1,521	45.1	
Liberal Democrats	Ed Fordham	621	18.4	
Green	Vicky Noble	511	15.2	
Conservative	Jacob Rodgers	499	14.8	
Chesterfield And North Derbyshire Independents	Kris Stone	220	6.5	
Majority		900	26.7	
Turnout		3,372		
Labour hold		Swing		

Staveley North By-Election 4 July 2024
Party	Candidate	Votes	%	±%
Labour	Steve Lismore	635	34.4	
Liberal Democrats	Stephen Hartley	592	32.1	
Conservative	Harry Smith	278	15.1	
Independent	Martin Hibbert	188	10.2	
Green	Joshua Ward	151	8.2	
Majority		43	2.3	
Turnout		1,844		
Labour gain from Liberal Democrats		Swing		

Brampton East and Boythorpe By-Election 1 May 2025
Party	Candidate	Votes	%	±%
Liberal Democrats	Keith Falconer	410	34.6	
Reform	Courtney James	350	29.6	
Labour	Pauline Twigg	235	19.8	
Independent	Jane Hindle	90	7.6	
Green	Katherine Noble	48	4.1	
Conservative	Jacob Rodgers	42	3.5	
Chesterfield And North Derbyshire Independents	David Jones	9	0.8	
Majority		60	5.1	
Turnout		1,184		
Liberal Democrats gain from Labour		Swing		

Staveley North By-Election 7 May 2026 (2 seats)
Party	Candidate	Votes	%	±%
Reform	Steven Barlow	490		
Reform	Dawn Taylor	430		
Liberal Democrats	Jane Collins	410		
Liberal Democrats	Stephen Hartley	393		
Green	Robert Ferrie	144		
Green	Alison Riley	144		
Labour	Dean Collins	124		
Labour	Lisa Collins	113		
Independent	Martin Hibbert	67		
Independent	Vicki Holmes	50		
Conservative	John Boult	46		
Conservative	Alison Hounslow	35		
Chesterfield And North Derbyshire Independents	Kris Stone	19		
Reform gain from Labour		Swing		
Reform gain from Liberal Democrats		Swing		
