= 2019 Bromsgrove District Council election =

2019 UK local government election

- 2 May 2019

All 31 seats to Bromsgrove District Council 16 seats needed for a majority

	First party	Second party	Third party
Party	Conservative	Labour	Independent
Last election	18 seats, 50.5%	7 seats, 23.9%	3 seats, 9.9%
Seats won	17	5	5
Seat change	▼1	▼2	▲2
Popular vote	12,022	5,957	4,592
Percentage	44.2%	21.9%	16.9%
Swing	▼6.3%	▼2.0%	▲7.0%
	Fourth party	Fifth party
Party	Liberal Democrats	Residents
Last election	0 seats, 2.2%	3 seats, 6.2%
Seats won	3	1
Seat change	▲3	▼2
Popular vote	2,792	1,357
Percentage	10.3%	5.0%
Swing	▲8.1%	▼1.2%
- Winner of each seat at the 2019 Bromsgrove District Council election
Council control before election
Conservative
Council control after election
Conservative

The 2019 Bromsgrove District Council election took place on 2 May 2019 to elect members of the Bromsgrove Council in England. It was held on the same day as other local elections.

== Summary ==
=== Election result ===
2019 Bromsgrove District Council election
Party	Candidates	Seats	Gains	Losses	Net gain/loss	Seats %	Votes %	Votes	+/−
Conservative	31	17	4	5	▼1	54.8	44.2	12,022	–6.3
Labour	24	5	0	2	▼2	16.1	21.9	5,957	–2.0
Independent	9	5	2	0	▲2	16.1	16.9	4,592	+7.0
Liberal Democrats	14	3	3	0	▲3	9.7	10.3	2,792	+8.1
Residents	4	1	0	2	▼2	3.2	5.0	1,357	–1.2
Green	4	0	0	0	Steady	0.0	1.8	499	–1.6

== Ward results ==
=== Alvechurch South ===
Alvechurch South
Party	Candidate	Votes	%	±%
Independent	Annette English	563	52.9	
Conservative	Trevor Bland	398	37.4	
Labour	Alan Cooper	54	5.1	
Liberal Democrats	Dean Petters	50	4.7	
Majority		165	15.5	
Rejected ballots		3	0.28	
Turnout		1,068	46.6	
Registered electors		2,293		
Independent gain from Conservative		Swing		

=== Alvechurch Village ===
Alvechurch Village
Party	Candidate	Votes	%	±%
Independent	Kathryn Van Der Plank	840	84.8	
Conservative	Neil Harris	104	10.5	
Labour	Louise Humphries	46	4.6	
Majority		736	74.3	
Rejected ballots		4	0.40	
Turnout		994	44.1	
Registered electors		2,254		
Independent gain from Conservative		Swing		

=== Aston Fields ===
Aston Fields
Party	Candidate	Votes	%	±%
Conservative	Philip Thomas	419	50.1	
Labour Co-op	Rory Shannon	418	49.9	
Majority		1	0.1	
Rejected ballots		37	4.23	
Turnout		874	35.1	
Registered electors		2,490		
Conservative hold		Swing		

=== Avoncroft ===
Avoncroft
Party	Candidate	Votes	%	±%
Conservative	Malcolm Glass	397	50.7	
Labour	John Ellis	211	26.9	
Liberal Democrats	Lean-Nani Alconcel	175	22.3	
Majority		186	23.8	
Rejected ballots		15	1.88	
Turnout		798	32.3	
Registered electors		2,470		
Conservative hold		Swing		

=== Barnt Green & Hopwood ===
Barnt Green & Hopwood
Party	Candidate	Votes	%	±%
Independent	Charles Hotham	898	82.1	
Conservative	Mary Marsh	196	17.9	
Majority		702	64.2	
Rejected ballots		6	0.55	
Turnout		1,100	46.4	
Registered electors		2,372		
Independent hold		Swing		

=== Belbroughton & Romsley ===
Belbroughton & Romsley (2 seats)
Party	Candidate	Votes	%	±%
Conservative	Karen May	1,322	76.5	
Conservative	Margaret Sherrey	1,230	71.2	
Labour	Philip Baker	309	17.9	
Labour	Caroline Thompson	301	17.4	
Majority		921	29.1	
Rejected ballots		49	2.76	
Turnout		1,777	33.9	
Registered electors		5,238		
Conservative hold				
Conservative hold				

=== Bromsgrove Central ===
Bromsgrove Central
Party	Candidate	Votes	%	±%
Liberal Democrats	Siobhan Hughes	536	50.1	
Conservative	Rita Dent	383	35.8	
Labour	Jane Elledge	151	14.1	
Majority		153	14.3	
Rejected ballots		13	1.20	
Turnout		1,083	46.1	
Registered electors		2,347		
Liberal Democrats gain from Conservative		Swing		

=== Catshill North ===
Catshill North
Party	Candidate	Votes	%	±%
Conservative	Jo-Anne Till	323	57.5	
Labour	Abdul Jilani	239	42.5	
Majority		84	14.9	
Rejected ballots		15	2.60	
Turnout		577	26.4	
Registered electors		2,189		
Conservative hold		Swing		

=== Catshill South ===
Catshill South
Party	Candidate	Votes	%	±%
Conservative	Shirley Webb	339	59.1	
Labour	Matthew Osborne	97	16.9	
Green	Julian Gray	96	16.7	
Liberal Democrats	Sarah Mansell	42	7.3	
Majority		242	42.2	
Rejected ballots		14	2.38	
Turnout		588	26.5	
Registered electors		2,220		
Conservative hold		Swing		

=== Charford ===
Charford
Party	Candidate	Votes	%	±%
Labour	Michael Thompson	469	76.8	
Conservative	Andrew Sherrey	142	23.2	
Majority		327	53.5	
Rejected ballots		13	2.08	
Turnout		624	27.3	
Registered electors		2,286		
Labour hold		Swing		

=== Cofton ===
Cofton
Party	Candidate	Votes	%	±%
Conservative	Richard Deeming	232	31.7	
Independent	Robin Van Der Plank	208	28.5	
Green	Gillian Harvey	130	17.8	
Labour	Antony Maslen	91	12.4	
Liberal Democrats	Sara Woodhouse	70	9.6	
Majority		24	3.3	
Rejected ballots		3	0.41	
Turnout		734	31.7	
Registered electors		2,319		
Conservative hold		Swing		

=== Drakes Cross ===
Drakes Cross
Party	Candidate	Votes	%	±%
Residents	Susan Baxter	460	58.2	
Conservative	Kathryn Powell	330	41.8	
Majority		130	16.5	
Rejected ballots		12	1.50	
Turnout		802	32.5	
Registered electors		2,470		
Residents hold		Swing		

=== Hagley East ===
Hagley East
Party	Candidate	Votes	%	±%
Independent	Rachel Jenkins	727	76.8	
Conservative	Cameron Uppal	219	23.2	
Majority		508	53.7	
Rejected ballots		12	1.25	
Turnout		958	40.8	
Registered electors		2,347		
Independent hold		Swing		

=== Hagley West ===
Hagley West
Party	Candidate	Votes	%	±%
Independent	Steven Colella	939	77.9	
Conservative	Kyle Daisley	267	22.1	
Majority		672	55.7	
Rejected ballots		3	0.25	
Turnout		1,209	42.6	
Registered electors		2,841		
Independent hold		Swing		

=== Hill Top ===
Hill Top
Party	Candidate	Votes	%	±%
Labour	Luke Mallett	681	90.7	
Conservative	Suzanne Morgan	70	9.3	
Majority		611	81.4	
Rejected ballots		10	1.31	
Turnout		761	42.4	
Registered electors		1,797		
Labour hold		Swing		

=== Hollywood ===
Hollywood
Party	Candidate	Votes	%	±%
Conservative	Adam Kent	490	56.6	
Residents	Keith Yates	295	34.1	
Labour	Marian Leydon	81	9.4	
Majority		195	22.5	
Rejected ballots		6	0.69	
Turnout		872	36.9	
Registered electors		2,365		
Conservative gain from Residents		Swing		

=== Lickey Hills ===
Lickey Hills
Party	Candidate	Votes	%	±%
Liberal Democrats	Janet King	484	56.4	
Conservative	Christopher Taylor	374	43.6	
Majority		110	12.8	
Rejected ballots		24	2.72	
Turnout		882	39.9	
Registered electors		2,213		
Liberal Democrats gain from Conservative		Swing		

=== Lowes Hill ===
Lowes Hill
Party	Candidate	Votes	%	±%
Conservative	Rodney Laight	372	46.6	
Labour	Brenda Henderson	236	29.5	
Liberal Democrats	Rebecca Stevens	191	23.9	
Majority		136	17.0	
Rejected ballots		19	2.32	
Turnout		818	31.6	
Registered electors		2,590		
Conservative hold		Swing		

=== Marlbrook ===
Marlbrook
Party	Candidate	Votes	%	±%
Conservative	Helen Jones	474	56.4	
Green	Peter Harvey	206	24.5	
Labour	Rosalind Cooke	160	19.0	
Majority		268	31.9	
Rejected ballots		22	2.55	
Turnout		862	36.1	
Registered electors		2,390		
Conservative hold		Swing		

=== Norton ===
Norton
Party	Candidate	Votes	%	±%
Liberal Democrats	Robert Hunter	675	76.7	
Conservative	Jacqueline Alderson	205	23.3	
Majority		470	53.4	
Rejected ballots		24	2.65	
Turnout		904	39.6	
Registered electors		2,285		
Liberal Democrats gain from Conservative		Swing		

=== Perryfields ===
Perryfields
Party	Candidate	Votes	%	±%
Conservative	Andrew Beaumont	308	57.1	
Labour	Amy-Jane Thompson-Lancaster	231	42.9	
Majority		77	14.3	
Rejected ballots		15	2.71	
Turnout		554	37.5	
Registered electors		1,478		
Conservative hold		Swing		

=== Rock Hill ===
Rock Hill
Party	Candidate	Votes	%	±%
Labour	Harrison Rone-Clarke	337	45.4	
Conservative	Del Booth	246	33.2	
Independent	Dean Smith	94	12.7	
Liberal Democrats	Michael Mihailovic	65	8.8	
Majority		91	12.3	
Rejected ballots		7	0.93	
Turnout		749	31.2	
Registered electors		2,402		
Labour hold		Swing		

=== Rubery North ===
Rubery North
Party	Candidate	Votes	%	±%
Labour	Peter McDonald	526	67.0	
Conservative	Faye Kent	259	33.0	
Majority		267	34.0	
Rejected ballots		22	2.73	
Turnout		807	33.2	
Registered electors		2,429		
Labour hold		Swing		

=== Rubery South ===
Rubery South
Party	Candidate	Votes	%	±%
Conservative	Adrian Kriss	352	39.7	
Labour	Christine McDonald	323	36.5	
Independent	Stephen Capewell	144	16.3	
Green	Kevin White	67	7.6	
Majority		29	3.3	
Rejected ballots		6	0.67	
Turnout		892	36.1	
Registered electors		2,471		
Conservative gain from Labour		Swing		

=== Sanders Park ===
Sanders Park
Party	Candidate	Votes	%	±%
Conservative	Maria Androsova-Middleton	467	55.6	
Labour	Gemma Weavis Long	373	44.4	
Majority		94	11.2	
Rejected ballots		29	3.34	
Turnout		869	32.4	
Registered electors		2,686		
Conservative gain from Labour		Swing		

=== Sidemoor ===
Sidemoor
Party	Candidate	Votes	%	±%
Labour	Susan Douglas	277	40.7	
Conservative	James Jarvis	253	37.2	
Liberal Democrats	Joshua Robinson	151	22.2	
Majority		24	3.5	
Rejected ballots		18	2.58	
Turnout		699	27.1	
Registered electors		2,584		
Labour hold		Swing		

=== Slideslow ===
Slideslow
Party	Candidate	Votes	%	±%
Conservative	Caroline Spencer	589	65.0	
Liberal Democrats	Samuel Evans	159	17.5	
Labour	David Skidmore	158	17.4	
Majority		430	47.5	
Rejected ballots		17	1.84	
Turnout		923	35.3	
Registered electors		2,618		
Conservative hold		Swing		

=== Tardebigge ===
Tardebigge
Party	Candidate	Votes	%	±%
Conservative	Peter Whittaker	472	55.1	
Independent	Sarah Courbet	179	20.9	
Labour	Sean Shannon	129	15.1	
Liberal Democrats	Nicholas Hind	77	9.0	
Majority		293	34.2	
Rejected ballots		8	0.92	
Turnout		865	36.8	
Registered electors		2,349		
Conservative hold		Swing		

=== Wythall East ===
Wythall East
Party	Candidate	Votes	%	±%
Conservative	Sarah Hession	419	51.2	
Residents	Helen Cleaver	345	42.1	
Liberal Democrats	Hazel Jonas	55	6.7	
Majority		74	9.0	
Rejected ballots		10	1.21	
Turnout		829	33.9	
Registered electors		2,448		
Conservative gain from Residents		Swing		

=== Wythall West ===
Wythall West
Party	Candidate	Votes	%	±%
Conservative	Geoffrey Denaro	371	49.5	
Residents	Stephen Peters	257	34.3	
Liberal Democrats	Sandra Docker	62	8.3	
Labour	Katharine Wilshaw	59	7.9	
Majority		114	15.2	
Rejected ballots		13	1.71	
Turnout		762	33.1	
Registered electors		2,300		
Conservative hold		Swing		

== Changes 2019–2023 ==
- In autumn 2019, Charford councillor Michael Thompson left the Labour Group to sit as an independent.
- On 31 January 2020, Thompson and three other campaigners launched the Charford Residents' Association, a local political party approved by the Electoral Commission.
- In February 2020, Sidemoor councillor Sue Douglas left the Labour Group, citing feeling under-appreciated, and joined the independent Bromsgrove Alliance grouping.
- On 13 January 2021, Thompson defected to the Conservative Party, joining the controlling group on the council.
