= Sedgemoor District Council elections =

Local government elections in Somerset, England

Sedgemoor District Council was the local authority for the district of Sedgemoor in Somerset, England. The council was elected every four years. Since the last boundary changes in 1999, 50 councillors were elected from 25 wards. The council was abolished on 1 April 2023, when it was replaced by Somerset Council, a unitary authority.

== Political control ==
Since the foundation of the council in 1973 political control of the council has been held by the following parties:

Party in control	Years
No overall control	1973–1976
Conservative	1976–1995
No overall control	1995–1999
Conservative	1999–2023

=== Leadership ===
The leader of the council from 2005 until the council's abolition in 2023 was:

Councillor	Party	From	To
Duncan McGinty	Conservative	Apr 2005	31 Mar 2023

== Council elections ==
- 1973 Sedgemoor District Council election
- 1976 Sedgemoor District Council election
- 1979 Sedgemoor District Council election (New ward boundaries)
- 1983 Sedgemoor District Council election (District boundary changes took place but the number of seats remained the same)
- 1987 Sedgemoor District Council election (District boundary changes took place but the number of seats remained the same)
- 1991 Sedgemoor District Council election (District boundary changes took place but the number of seats remained the same)
- 1995 Sedgemoor District Council election
- 1999 Sedgemoor District Council election (New ward boundaries increased the number of seats by one)
- 2003 Sedgemoor District Council election
- 2007 Sedgemoor District Council election
- 2011 Sedgemoor District Council election (New ward boundaries)
- 2015 Sedgemoor District Council election
- 2019 Sedgemoor District Council election

== District result maps ==
1999 results map

2003 results map

2007 results map

2011 results map

2015 results map

2019 results map

== By-election results ==
=== 1999-2003 ===
Brent North By-Election 30 September 1999
Party	Candidate	Votes	%	±%
Conservative		293	77.7	+4.6
Labour		84	22.3	−4.6
Majority		209	55.4	
Turnout		377	24.1	
Conservative hold		Swing		

Huntspill & Pawlett By-Election 1 June 2000
Party	Candidate	Votes	%	±%
Liberal Democrats		556	51.1	+18.4
Conservative		533	48.9	+4.3
Majority		23	2.2	
Turnout		1,089	40.0	
Liberal Democrats gain from Conservative		Swing		

Brent North By-Election 17 January 2002
Party	Candidate	Votes	%	±%
Conservative		426	64.5	−8.6
Liberal Democrats		203	30.8	+30.8
Labour		16	2.4	−24.5
UKIP		15	2.3	+2.3
Majority		223	33.7	
Turnout		660	40.3	
Conservative hold		Swing		

=== 2003-2007 ===
Bridgwater Quantock By-Election 10 July 2003
Party	Candidate	Votes	%	±%
Conservative		660	51.0	+4.2
Liberal Democrats		453	35.0	+4.3
Labour		180	13.9	−8.6
Majority		207	16.0	
Turnout		1,293	26.0	
Conservative hold		Swing		

Berrow By-Election 20 January 2005
Party	Candidate	Votes	%	±%
Conservative		340	57.2	−0.5
Liberal Democrats		254	42.8	+0.5
Majority		86	14.4	
Turnout		594	32.1	
Conservative hold		Swing		

Cheddar and Shipham By-Election 5 May 2005
Party	Candidate	Votes	%	±%
Conservative		1,689	50.4	+2.6
Independent		1,663	49.6	+49.6
Majority		26	0.8	
Turnout		3,352		
Conservative hold		Swing		
