= 2003 Forest Heath District Council election =

2003 UK local government election

Map of the results

The 2003 Forest Heath District Council election took place on 1 May 2003 to elect members of Forest Heath District Council in England. This was on the same day as other local elections.

The whole council was up for election on new ward boundaries. The number of seats increased from 25 to 27.

== Summary ==
2003 Forest Heath District Council election
Party	Seats	Gains	Losses	Net gain/loss	Seats %	Votes %	Votes	+/−
Conservative	21			Steady	77.8	51.7	9,462	-10.9
West Suffolk Independent	3			▲3	11.1	15.3	2,808	N/A
Independent	3			▲2	11.1	11.3	2,064	+3.0
Labour	0			▼1	0.0	16.0	2,926	-9.4
UKIP	0			Steady	0.0	4.3	794	N/A
Liberal Democrats	0			▼2	0.0	1.4	251	-2.3

== By-elections ==
=== Manor ===
Manor: 28 October 2004
Party	Candidate	Votes	%	±%
Conservative		269	66.9	
Independent		133	33.1	
Majority		136	33.8	
Turnout		402		
Conservative gain from Independent		Swing		

=== Red Lodge ===
Red Lodge: 15 December 2005
Party	Candidate	Votes	%	±%
Liberal Democrats		173	55.3	
Conservative		111	35.5	
UKIP		29	9.3	
Majority		62	19.8	
Turnout		313		
Liberal Democrats gain from Conservative		Swing		
