= Taunton Deane Borough Council elections =

Local government elections in Somerset, England

Taunton Deane Borough Council in Somerset, England was elected every four years. The first elections to the council were held in 1973, ahead of it coming into being in 1974. The last election was held in 2015. The council was abolished in 2019 when the district merged with neighbouring West Somerset district to become Somerset West and Taunton.

== Political control ==
From the first election to the council in 1973 until its abolition in 2019, political control of the council was held by the following parties:

Party in control	Years
No overall control	1973–1976
Conservative	1976–1991
Liberal Democrats	1991–1999
No overall control	1999–2003
Conservative	2003–2007
No overall control	2007–2015
Conservative	2015–2019

=== Leadership ===
The leaders of the council from 1974 to 2019 were:

Councillor	Party	From	To
John Meikle	Conservative	1974	1991
Jefferson Horsley	Liberal Democrats	1991	May 2003
John Williams	Conservative	14 May 2003	May 2007
Ross Henley	Liberal Democrats	16 May 2007	13 May 2010
John Williams	Conservative	13 May 2010	31 Mar 2019

John Williams also served as leader of the shadow authority for Somerset West and Taunton during 2018–2019 ahead of the new council coming into force, but was unsuccessful in securing a seat on the new council at its first elections in May 2019.

== Council elections ==
- 1973 Taunton Deane District Council election
- 1976 Taunton Deane Borough Council election
- 1979 Taunton Deane Borough Council election (New ward boundaries)
- 1983 Taunton Deane Borough Council election
- 1987 Taunton Deane Borough Council election (New ward boundaries & borough boundary changes also took place)
- 1991 Taunton Deane Borough Council election
- 1995 Taunton Deane Borough Council election
- 1999 Taunton Deane Borough Council election (New ward boundaries)
- 2003 Taunton Deane Borough Council election
- 2007 Taunton Deane Borough Council election (New ward boundaries increased the number of seats by 2)
- 2011 Taunton Deane Borough Council election
- 2015 Taunton Deane Borough Council election

== District result maps ==
2003 results map

2007 results map

2011 results map

2015 results map

== By-election results ==
=== 1995-1999 ===
Lynford By-Election 1 May 1997
Party	Candidate	Votes	%	±%
Liberal Democrats		1,191	44.0	+15.2
Labour		981	36.6	−21.6
Conservative		530	19.6	+6.2
Majority		2,172	7.4	
Turnout		2,702		
Liberal Democrats gain from Labour		Swing		

Taunton Halcon By-Election 1 May 1997
Party	Candidate	Votes	%	±%
Liberal Democrats		1,100	43.9	+0.8
Labour		826	33.0	−12.5
Conservative		578	23.1	+11.6
Majority		274	10.9	
Turnout		2,504		
Liberal Democrats hold		Swing		

Bishops Lydeard By-Election 10 July 1997
Party	Candidate	Votes	%	±%
Conservative		395	49.6	+35.7
Liberal Democrats		338	42.5	−4.0
Labour		63	7.9	−7.8
Majority		57	7.1	
Turnout		796	36.8	
Conservative gain from Liberal Democrats		Swing		

=== 1999-2003 ===
Monument By-Election 21 March 2002
Party	Candidate	Votes	%	±%
Conservative	Chris Tolchard	430	65.3	−0.5
Liberal Democrats	Geoffrey Henley	228	34.7	+10.0
Majority		202	30.6	
Turnout		658	40.0	
Conservative hold		Swing		

Ruishton and Creech By-Election 14 November 2002
Party	Candidate	Votes	%	±%
Liberal Democrats	Kim Cooper	576	40.3	−1.7
Conservative		518	36.3	−0.4
Independent		334	23.4	+2.1
Majority		58	4.0	
Turnout		1,428	44.0	
Liberal Democrats hold		Swing		

=== 2003-2007 ===
Taunton Eastgate By-Election 5 May 2005
Party	Candidate	Votes	%	±%
Liberal Democrats	Simon Coles	1,030	51.5	+9.0
Conservative	Roger Ryan	621	31.1	+0.6
Labour	Martin Peters	347	17.4	+1.6
Majority		409	20.4	
Turnout		1,998	58.9	
Liberal Democrats hold		Swing		

Taunton Monument By-Election 5 May 2005
Party	Candidate	Votes	%	±%
Conservative	Christopher Hill	701	58.8	−13.3
Liberal Democrats	Geoffrey Henley	491	41.2	+13.3
Majority		210	17.6	
Turnout		1,192	72.4	
Conservative hold		Swing		

Wellington Rockwell Green and West By-Election 5 May 2005
Party	Candidate	Votes	%	±%
Conservative	John Clark	1,157	38.5	+10.5
Liberal Democrats	Vivienne Stock-Williams	1,132	37.7	+7.6
Labour	David Mitton	717	23.9	+8.1
Majority		25	0.8	
Turnout		3,006	71.4	
Conservative hold		Swing		

Taunton Blackbrook & Holway By-Election 4 May 2006
Party	Candidate	Votes	%	±%
Liberal Democrats	Peter Smith	1,326	75.3	+26.8
Conservative	Martin Seamark	436	24.7	−9.9
Majority		890	50.9	
Turnout		1,762	35.9	
Liberal Democrats hold		Swing		

=== 2007-2011 ===
Comeytrowe By-Election 1 May 2008
Party	Candidate	Votes	%	±%
Liberal Democrats	Mollie Floyd	1,362	60.1	+4.0
Conservative	Wendy Skene	778	34.3	−1.3
UKIP	Dorothy Baker	127	5.6	+5.6
Majority		584	25.8	
Turnout		2,267	50.1	
Liberal Democrats hold		Swing		

Ruishton and Creech By-Election 2 October 2008
Party	Candidate	Votes	%	±%
Conservative	Kelly Durdan	902	56.3	+6.8
Liberal Democrats	Cilla Owen	700	43.7	+3.2
Majority		202	12.6	
Turnout		1,602		
Conservative hold		Swing		

Lyngford By-Election 15 October 2009
Party	Candidate	Votes	%	±%
Liberal Democrats	Nicci Court	523	51.0	+6.6
Conservative	Tonia White	274	26.7	−1.2
Labour	Martin Jevon	164	16.0	−11.6
UKIP	Stephanie Lukins	64	6.2	+6.2
Majority		249	24.3	
Turnout		1,025	25.5	
Liberal Democrats hold		Swing		

Lyngford By-Election 28 January 2010
Party	Candidate	Votes	%	±%
Liberal Democrats	Ben Swaine	390	43.7	−0.7
Conservative	John Gage	253	28.4	+0.4
Labour	Martin Jevon	190	21.3	−6.3
UKIP	Charlene Sheriff	59	6.6	+6.6
Majority		137	15.3	
Turnout		892	22.3	
Liberal Democrats hold		Swing		

=== 2011-2019 ===
Blackdown by-election 15 December 2016
Party	Candidate	Votes	%	±%
Liberal Democrats	Ross Henley	440	71.2	+49.9
Conservative	Giuseppe Farschini	164	22.5	−30.4
Independent	Carl Bennyworth	39	6.3	N/A
Majority		276	48.7	
Turnout				
Liberal Democrats gain from Conservative		Swing		
