= Somerset Council elections =

Local election in England

Somerset Council elections are held every four years to elect Somerset Council, the local authority for the non-metropolitan county of Somerset in South West England. From 1889 until 2023 the council was called Somerset County Council and it was an upper tier county council, with district-level functions being provided by the area's district councils. The districts were all abolished with effect from 1 April 2023, at which point the county council became a unitary authority, taking on the functions of the abolished district councils. The county council changed its name to Somerset Council to coincide with the change in its powers. There are 110 councillors, elected from 54 wards.

== Summary of recent elections ==
The Conservative Party has been the largest or second-largest party on the council since 1973, and since 1981 has competed with the Liberal Democrats for control; each party has formed several majority administrations in the period since.

In 2009, the Conservative Party UK won 35 seats, a six seat majority, with the Liberal Democrats UK coming second with 21 seats, in 2013 the Conservative Party UK won 29 seats, a one seat majority, with the Liberal Democrats UK coming second with 18 seats and UKIP (a new entrant) coming joint third with Labour Party UK on three seats. In 2017 the Conservative Party UK won back seats and ended up winning 35 seats, gaining them a seven seat majority, in this election, UKIP did not stand and the Liberal Democrats UK continued their loss of seats dropping to 12 (although they remained in second place).

The 2022 local elections in Somerset were fought on new boundaries, with 110 seats available within the new unitary council. In this election the Liberal Democrats UK won 61 seats granting them a five seat majority, the Conservative Party UK came second with 36 seats.

== Election results ==
Composition of the council
Year	Conservative	Liberal Democrats (Note: Includes totals for the predecessors of the Liberal Democrats, the Liberal Party and SDP (both of which participated in the Alliance).)	Labour	Green (Note: Includes totals for the predecessors of the Green Party of England and Wales, the Ecology Party and Green Party UK.)	UKIP	Independents & Others	Council control after election
Local government reorganisation; council reorganised (56 seats)
1973	34	2	8	–	–	12	Conservative
1977	44	0	3	0	–	9	Conservative
New division boundaries (57 seats)
1981	33	8	9	0	–	7	Conservative
1985	24	26	7	0	–	0	No overall control
1989	32	17	6	0	–	2	Conservative
1993	13	41	2	0	–	1	Liberal Democrats
1997	17	37	3	0	0	0	Liberal Democrats
New division boundaries (58 seats)
2001	24	29	5	0	0	0	No overall control
2005	24	30	4	0	0	0	Liberal Democrats
2009	35	21	2	0	0	0	Conservative
New division boundaries (55 seats)
2013	28	19	3	0	3	2	Conservative
2017	35	12	3	2	0	3	Conservative
Somerset becomes a unitary authority (110 seats)
2022	36	61	5	5	0	3	Liberal Democrats

== Council elections ==
- 1973 Somerset County Council election
- 1977 Somerset County Council election
- 1981 Somerset County Council election (boundary changes)
- 1985 Somerset County Council election
- 1989 Somerset County Council election
- 1993 Somerset County Council election
- 1997 Somerset County Council election
- 2001 Somerset County Council election (boundary changes increased the number of seats by one)
- 2005 Somerset County Council election
- 2009 Somerset County Council election
- 2013 Somerset County Council election
- 2017 Somerset County Council election
- 2022 Somerset Council election

== County result maps ==
2001 results map

2005 results map

2009 results map

2013 results map

2017 results map

2022 results map

== By-election results ==
=== 1997–2001 ===
Minehead By-Election 30 July 1998
Party	Candidate	Votes	%	±%
Conservative		1,428	42.6	+7.2
Liberal Democrats		1,125	33.6	−1.4
Labour		798	23.8	−5.8
Majority		303	9.0	
Turnout		3,351	37.0	
Conservative hold		Swing		

Lydeard By-Election 28 October 1999
Party	Candidate	Votes	%	±%
Conservative		948	68.2	+28.7
Liberal Democrats		442	31.8	−14.0
Majority		506	36.4	
Turnout		1,390	28.0	
Conservative gain from Liberal Democrats		Swing		

=== 2005–2009 ===
Mendip North East By-Election 1 May 2008
Party	Candidate	Votes	%	±%
Conservative	Matthew Ellis	1,568	51.2	+6.9
Liberal Democrats	Ian Hasell	1,497	48.8	+9.7
Majority		71	2.4	
Turnout		3,065	43.8	
Conservative hold		Swing		

Shepton Mallett By-Election 29 May 2008
Party	Candidate	Votes	%	±%
Conservative	Margaret Robinson	950	47.4	+10.0
Liberal Democrats	Rachel Witcombe	783	39.1	+5.5
Labour	Christopher Inchley	271	13.5	−15.5
Majority		167	8.3	
Turnout		2,004	29.0	
Conservative hold		Swing		

=== 2009–2013 ===
Shepton Mallett By-Election 5 May 2011
Party	Candidate	Votes	%	±%
Conservative	John Parham	1,307	41.3	−7.8
Liberal Democrats	Garfield Kennedy	892	28.2	−6.2
Labour	Chris Inchley	711	22.5	+6.0
Green	Ian Forster	256	8.1	+8.1
Majority		415	13.1	
Turnout		3,166		
Conservative hold		Swing		

South Petherton By-Election 4 August 2011
Party	Candidate	Votes	%	±%
Liberal Democrats	Paul Maxwell	1,333	53.6	+13.3
Conservative	Paul Thompson	943	37.9	−5.4
Green	Ian Greenfield	108	4.3	−2.9
UKIP	Godfrey Davey	104	4.2	+4.2
Majority		390	15.7	
Turnout		2,488		
Liberal Democrats gain from Conservative		Swing		

Brent By-Election 1 December 2011
Party	Candidate	Votes	%	±%
Conservative	John Denbee	1,285	58.0	−11.9
Liberal Democrats	Helen Groves	932	42.0	+17.3
Majority		353	15.9	
Turnout		2,217		
Conservative hold		Swing		

=== 2013–2017 ===
Frome North By-Election 25 September 2014
Party	Candidate	Votes	%	±%
Conservative	Linda Oliver	1,163	47.7	+12.0
Liberal Democrats	Damon Hooton	836	34.3	−3.0
Labour	Catherine Richardson	163	6.7	−4.1
Independent	Adrian Dobinson	139	5.7	+5.7
Green	Les Spalding	139	5.7	+5.7
Majority		327	13.4	
Turnout		2,440		
Conservative gain from Liberal Democrats		Swing		

Taunton North By-Election 7 May 2015
Party	Candidate	Votes	%	±%
Conservative	Michael Adkins	1,298	29.9	+12.5
Liberal Democrats	Barrie Hall	976	22.5	−8.2
Labour	Libby Lisgo	927	21.4	−0.7
UKIP	Robert Bainbridge	814	18.8	−5.1
Green	Alan Debenham	326	7.5	+1.6
Majority		322	7.4	
Turnout		4,341		
Conservative gain from Liberal Democrats		Swing		

=== 2017–2022 ===
Comeytrowe & Trull By-Election 7 October 2021
Party	Candidate	Votes	%	±%
Liberal Democrats	Dawn Johnson	1,677	63.2	+15.6
Conservative	Ruth Harmon	886	33.4	−6.4
Labour	Michael McGuffie	92	3.5	−2.4
Majority		791	29.8	
Turnout		2,655		
Liberal Democrats hold		Swing	▲11.0	

=== 2022–2027 ===
Castle Cary By-Election 10 August 2023
Party	Candidate	Votes	%	±%
Liberal Democrats	Kevin Messenger	1,247	54.8	+10.4
Conservative	David Hall	614	27.0	−15.7
Green	Ewan Jones	415	18.2	+5.3
Majority		633	27.8	
Turnout		2,276		
Liberal Democrats gain from Conservative		Swing		

Somerton By-Election 28 March 2024
Party	Candidate	Votes	%	±%
Liberal Democrats	Stephen Page	1,212	50.1	−1.0
Conservative	David Hall	878	36.3	−2.2
Labour	Gregory Chambers	174	7.2	−0.5
Green	Matthew Geen	154	6.4	+6.4
Majority		334	13.8	
Turnout		2,418		
Liberal Democrats hold		Swing		

Mendip South By-Election 2 May 2024
Party	Candidate	Votes	%	±%
Liberal Democrats	Rob Reed	1,313	47.3	−5.5
Conservative	Ken Maddock	1,122	40.4	−6.8
Green	Michael Smyth	200	7.2	+7.2
Labour	David Oakensen	139	5.0	+5.0
Majority		191	6.9	
Turnout		2,774		
Liberal Democrats hold		Swing		

Blackmoor Vale By-Election 21 November 2024
Party	Candidate	Votes	%	±%
Conservative	Hayward Burt	1,120	57.4	+13.1
Liberal Democrats	Howard Ellard	714	36.6	−19.1
Green	Peter Ebsworth	86	4.4	+4.4
Labour	Gregory Chambers	32	1.6	+1.6
Majority		406	20.8	
Turnout		1,952		
Conservative gain from Liberal Democrats		Swing		

Rowbarton and Staplegrove By-Election 21 November 2024
Party	Candidate	Votes	%	±%
Liberal Democrats	Nick O'Donnell	817	58.3	+1.7
Conservative	Pete Prior-Sankey	396	28.3	−2.3
Green	Alan William Debenham	102	7.3	+7.3
Labour	Moya Patricia Doherty	86	6.1	−6.7
Majority		421	30.0	
Turnout		1,401		
Liberal Democrats hold		Swing		

Dunster By-Election 23 October 2025
Party	Candidate	Votes	%	±%
Liberal Democrats	Cara Strom	1,142	49.6	+2.8
Reform	Jonathan Rollason	666	28.9	N/A
Conservative	James Bellamy	449	19.5	−29.7
Labour	Terry Ledlie	44	1.9	−5.2
Majority				
Turnout		2,307	32.2	
Liberal Democrats gain from Conservative		Swing		

Glastonbury By-Election 23 October 2025
Party	Candidate	Votes	%	±%
Liberal Democrats	Ewan Cameron	882	36.4	−5.8
Reform	Henry Warne	523	21.6	N/A
Conservative	Lili Osborn	506	20.9	−9.2
Green	Jon Cousins	480	19.8	−11.3
Labour	Gregory Chambers	35	1.4	N/A
Majority		359	14.8	
Turnout		2,431	33.5	
Liberal Democrats hold		Swing		

Mendip Hills By-Election 7 May 2026
Party	Candidate	Votes	%	±%
Liberal Democrats	Sam Phripp	1,534	41.5	−3.6
Reform	Greg Stone	936	25.3	+25.3
Conservative	Nicola Perold	724	19.6	−19.4
Green	Victoria Welsh	330	8.9	−7.0
Independent	Abi McGuire	107	2.9	+2.9
Labour	Terry Ledlie	64	1.7	+1.7
Majority		598	16.2	
Turnout		3,695		
Liberal Democrats hold		Swing		

Frome West By-Election 3 September 2026
Party	Candidate	Votes	%	±%
Green	Dominic Ellison	663	41.4	−5.7
Liberal Democrats	Drew Gardner	544	34.0	+0.6
Reform	Joseph Williams	218	13.6	+13.6
Labour	Christopher Wildridge	89	5.6	−1.0
Conservative	David Quantrill-Simon	87	5.4	−7.5
Majority		119	7.4	
Turnout		1,601		
Green hold		Swing		
