= 2013 Somerset County Council election =

UN Somerset county's local elections 2 May 2013

← 2009	2 May 2013	2017 →

All 55 seats to Somerset County Council 28 seats needed for a majority
	First party	Second party	Third party
	Con	LD	UKIP
Party	Conservative	Liberal Democrats	UKIP
Last election	35 seats, 46.5%	21 seats, 36.3%	0 seats, 4.2%
Seats won	29	18	3
Seat change	▼6	▼3	▲3
Popular vote	52,279	38,989	29,710
Percentage	35.0%	26.1%	19.9%
Swing	▼11.5%	▼10.2%	▲15.7%
	Fourth party	Fifth party
	Lab	Ind
Party	Labour	Independent
Last election	2 seats, 4.7%	0 seats, 4.6%
Seats won	3	2
Seat change	▲1	▲2
Popular vote	17,592	4,333
Percentage	11.8%	2.9%
Swing	▲7.1%	▼1.7%
- Map showing the results of the 2013 Somerset County Council elections.
Council control before election
Conservative Party
Council control after election
Conservative Party

An election to Somerset County Council took place on 2 May 2013 as part of the 2013 United Kingdom local elections. 55 councillors were elected from 54 electoral divisions, which returned one county councillor each with the exception of the two-member Glastonbury & Street division. Members were elected by the first-past-the-post voting system for a four-year term of office. The electoral divisions were changed from those used at the previous election in 2009, reducing the number of county councillors from 58 to 55 from this election. No elections were held in North Somerset or Bath and North East Somerset, which are unitary authorities outside the area covered by the County Council.

The Conservative Party retained control of the council, despite having their majority reduced. They won 28 of the 54 seats contested on 2 May, in addition to the division of Coker, where the election was delayed until 16 May due to the death of one of the candidates.

All locally registered electors (British, Irish, Commonwealth and European Union citizens) who were aged 18 or over on Thursday 2 May 2013 were entitled to vote in the local elections. Those who were temporarily away from their ordinary address (for example, away working, on holiday, in student accommodation or in hospital) were also entitled to vote in the local elections, although those who had moved abroad and registered as overseas electors cannot vote in the local elections. It is possible to register to vote at more than one address (such as a university student who had a term-time address and lives at home during holidays) at the discretion of the local Electoral Register Office, but it remains an offence to vote more than once in the same local government election.

== Overall results ==
Somerset County Council election, 2013
Party	Seats	Gains	Losses	Net gain/loss	Seats %	Votes %	Votes	+/−
Conservative	29			–6	52.7	35.0	52,279	–11.5
Liberal Democrats	18			–3	32.7	26.1	38,989	–10.2
UKIP	3	3	0	+3	5.5	19.9	29,710	+15.7
Labour	3	1	0	+1	5.5	11.8	17,592	+7.1
Independent	2	2	0	+2	3.6	2.9	4,333	–1.7
Green	0	0	0	–	0	4.3	6,436	+1.5
English Democrat	0	0	0	–	0	0.0	42	+0.0

== Results by division ==
=== Bishops Hull & Taunton West ===
Bishops Hull & Taunton West
Party	Candidate	Votes	%	±%
Liberal Democrats	Justine Marie Baker	1,015	35.1	N/A
Conservative	Ian Morrell	953	33.0	N/A
UKIP	Laura Harriet Bailhache	549	19.0	N/A
Labour	Matthew William Rhys Ravenhill	219	7.6	N/A
Green	John Augustine Ainsworth	153	5.3	N/A
Majority		62	2.1	N/A
Turnout		2,889	37	N/A
Registered electors		7,808		
Liberal Democrats win (new seat)				

=== Blackdown & Neroche ===
Blackdown & Neroche
Party	Candidate	Votes	%	±%
Liberal Democrats	Ross Longhurst Henley *	1,035	35.8	N/A
Conservative	Julian Turner Davidson	988	34.1	N/A
UKIP	Clive Mark Rust	566	20.0	N/A
Labour	Madeleine Spears	183	6.3	N/A
Green	Darrelle Anne Bower	123	4.2	N/A
Majority		47	1.7	N/A
Turnout		2,895	37	N/A
Registered electors		7,893		
Liberal Democrats win (new seat)				

=== Blackmoor Vale ===
Blackmoor Vale
Party	Candidate	Votes	%	±%
Conservative	William Wallace *	1,410	52.0	–7.6
UKIP	Alex Wood **	665	24.5	N/A
Liberal Democrats	Damon John Hooton	412	15.2	–25.2
Labour	Jo Penberthy	224	8.3	N/A
Majority		745	27.5	+8.3
Turnout		2,711	37	–11
Registered electors		7,287		
Conservative hold		Swing		

  - Note: Alex Wood's candidature was suspended shortly before the elections, due to photos which appeared on his private Facebook account, showing him making a Nazi-style salute and with a knife in his teeth.

=== Brent ===
Brent
Party	Candidate	Votes	%	±%
Conservative	John Denbee	1,492	65.3	–4.6
Liberal Democrats	Katie Lawson	456	20.0	–4.7
Labour	Sheila Forrester	336	14.7	+9.3
Majority		1,036	45.3	+0.1
Turnout		2,284	31	–15
Registered electors		7,507		
Conservative hold		Swing		

=== Bridgwater East & Bawdrip ===
Bridgwater East & Bawdrip
Party	Candidate	Votes	%	±%
Conservative	David Hall *	717	37.1	–21.5
UKIP	Richard Scammell	610	31.6	N/A
Labour	Barbara O'Connor	493	25.5	+5.4
Liberal Democrats	Bob Bryant	113	5.8	–15.5
Majority		107	5.5	–31.7
Turnout		1,933	24	–6
Registered electors		8,030		
Conservative hold		Swing		

=== Bridgwater North & Central ===
Bridgwater North & Central
Party	Candidate	Votes	%	±%
Labour	Dave Loveridge *	700	63.9	+33.8
Conservative	John Harwood	246	22.5	–6.3
Liberal Democrats	Janice Beasley	149	13.6	–0.1
Majority		454	41.4	+40.2
Turnout		1,095	16	–9
Registered electors		7,016		
Labour hold		Swing		

=== Bridgwater South ===
Bridgwater South
Party	Candidate	Votes	%	±%
Labour	Leigh Redman	974	62.7	+29.5
Conservative	Lance Duddridge	580	37.3	+1.8
Majority		394	25.4	N/A
Turnout		1,554	20	–3
Registered electors		8,170		
Labour gain from Conservative		Swing		

The nomination of Judith Kendall (Liberal Democrats) was ruled as invalid

=== Bridgwater West ===
Bridgwater West
Party	Candidate	Votes	%	±%
Conservative	Ann Bown *	715	38.6	–7.2
UKIP	Victoria Gardner	541	29.2	N/A
Labour	Richard Hampson	463	25.0	+3.6
Liberal Democrats	Alan Beasley	134	7.2	–11.1
Majority		174	9.4	–14.9
Turnout		1,853	24	–8
Registered electors		7,777		
Conservative hold		Swing		

=== Brympton ===
Brympton
Party	Candidate	Votes	%	±%
Liberal Democrats	Sam Crabb *	811	41.3	N/A
Conservative	Josh Williams	568	28.9	N/A
UKIP	Robert Leslie Pattemore	432	22.0	N/A
Labour	Dan Marks	153	7.8	N/A
Majority		243	12.4	N/A
Turnout		1,964	30	N/A
Registered electors		6,640		
Liberal Democrats win (new seat)				

=== Burnham on Sea North ===
Burnham on Sea North
Party	Candidate	Votes	%	±%
Conservative	Peter Burridge-Clayton *	1,327	50.3	–4.2
Liberal Democrats	Tom Nicholls	722	27.4	–18.1
Labour	Clarke Leander	335	12.7	N/A
Green	James Robertson	253	9.6	N/A
Majority		605	22.9	+13.8
Turnout		2,637	33	–15
Registered electors		8,035		
Conservative hold		Swing		

=== Cannington ===
Cannington
Party	Candidate	Votes	%	±%
Conservative	John Edney *	1,453	60.8	–1.3
Liberal Democrats	Jill Dillamore	480	20.1	–2.7
Labour	Ted Stock	456	19.1	N/A
Majority		973	40.7	+1.4
Turnout		2,389	33	–11
Registered electors		7,292		
Conservative hold		Swing		

David Wilson (UK Independence Party) was withdrawn as a candidate before the close of nominations

=== Castle Cary ===
Castle Cary
Party	Candidate	Votes	%	±%
Conservative	Mike Lewis	1,529	43.7	–6.4
Liberal Democrats	Henry Hobhouse	1,196	34.2	–15.7
UKIP	Chris Hill	627	17.9	N/A
Labour	Adrian Carter	144	4.1	N/A
Majority		333	9.5	+9.3
Turnout		3,496	46	–10
Registered electors		7,598		
Conservative hold		Swing		

=== Chard North ===
Chard North
Party	Candidate	Votes	%	±%
UKIP	Nigel Charles Pearson	987	33.4	N/A
Conservative	Martin John Wale	881	29.8	–10.9
Liberal Democrats	Jason Paul Baker	748	25.3	–20.5
Labour	Graham Forsyth	220	7.5	+4.2
Green	John Lewes	117	4.0	N/A
Majority		106	3.6	N/A
Turnout		2,953	37	–9
Registered electors		8,067		
UKIP gain from Liberal Democrats		Swing		

=== Chard South ===
Chard South
Party	Candidate	Votes	%	±%
Liberal Democrats	Jill Shortland *	833	38.2	–12.9
UKIP	Ron McDonald	631	29.0	N/A
Conservative	Peter George Amey	496	22.8	–11.6
Labour	Bill Byrd	124	5.7	N/A
Green	Peter Rosser	95	4.4	N/A
Majority		202	9.3	–8.5
Turnout		2,179	32	–9
Registered electors		6,721		
Liberal Democrats hold		Swing		

=== Cheddar ===
Cheddar
Party	Candidate	Votes	%	±%
Conservative	Dawn Hill *	907	39.2	–6.3
UKIP	Jake Baynes	605	26.2	+10.0
Liberal Democrats	Maurice Holdstock	440	19.0	–15.6
Labour	Norma Scanion	360	15.6	N/A
Majority		302	13.1	+2.2
Turnout		2,312	32	–14
Conservative hold		Swing		

=== Coker ===
Coker
Party	Candidate	Votes	%	±%
Conservative	Marcus John Hudson Fysh	1,303	37.8	–4.9
Liberal Democrats	Ian Stephen	1,079	31.3	–14.2
UKIP	Vhie Boxall	702	20.4	N/A
Labour	Murry William Shepstone	195	5.7	N/A
Green	Peter John Bysouth	165	4.8	–3.0
Majority		224	6.5	N/A
Turnout		3,444	45	–5
Registered electors		7,629		
Conservative gain from Liberal Democrats		Swing		

Election was deferred until 16 May 2013, due to the death of the original UK Independence Party candidate, Audrey Spencer

=== Comeytrowe & Trull ===
Comeytrowe & Trull
Party	Candidate	Votes	%	±%
Liberal Democrats	Alan Wedderkopp	1,498	39.9	N/A
Conservative	Stephen Henry Martin-Scott *	1,164	31.0	N/A
UKIP	Barry Morris	713	19.0	N/A
Labour	James Hugh Bickham	243	6.5	N/A
Green	John Jurgensen	139	3.7	N/A
Majority		334	8.9	N/A
Turnout		3757	46	N/A
Registered electors		8,175		
Liberal Democrats win (new seat)				

=== Crewkerne ===
Crewkerne
Party	Candidate	Votes	%	±%
Liberal Democrats	John Dyke *	1,329	46.0	–6.7
Conservative	Marcus Morton Barratt	716	24.8	–10.4
UKIP	Sidney Hamlin	570	19.7	N/A
Green	Ben Keiron Hartshorn	140	4.8	–7.3
Labour	Joe Conway	136	4.7	N/A
Majority		613	21.2	+3.7
Turnout		2,891	41	–8
Registered electors		7,097		
Liberal Democrats hold		Swing		

=== Curry Rivel & Langport ===
Curry Rivel & Langport
Party	Candidate	Votes	%	±%
Conservative	Derek Norman Lander Yeomans *	1,552	42.2	N/A
Liberal Democrats	Adam Dance	1,048	28.5	N/A
UKIP	Donald Charles Mallett	618	16.8	N/A
Green	Cara Ann Naden	333	9.1	N/A
Labour	Doug Northcott	124	3.4	N/A
Majority		504	13.7	N/A
Turnout		3,675	44	N/A
Registered electors		8,364		
Conservative win (new seat)				

=== Dulverton & Exmoor ===
Dulverton & Exmoor
Party	Candidate	Votes	%	±%
Conservative	Frances Mary Nicholson *	1,650	63.8	+9.2
UKIP	Adrian Behan	643	24.9	N/A
Labour	Maureen Ann Smith	293	11.3	N/A
Majority		1,007	38.9	+29.8
Turnout		2,586	39	–14
Registered electors		6,569		
Conservative hold		Swing		

=== Dunster ===
Dunster
Party	Candidate	Votes	%	±%
Conservative	Christine Mary Lawrence *	978	40.4	–23.7
UKIP	Stephen Edward Fitzgerald	687	28.4	N/A
Labour Co-op	Andy Lewis	343	14.2	N/A
Liberal Democrats	Tony Bowden	215	8.9	–27.0
Green	Nicky Gibbard	195	8.1	N/A
Majority		291	12.0	–16.2
Turnout		2,418	36	–8
Registered electors		6,745		
Conservative hold		Swing		

=== Frome East ===
Frome East
Party	Candidate	Votes	%	±%
Liberal Democrats	Alvin John Horsfall *	835	35.6	N/A
Conservative	James Godman	582	24.8	N/A
UKIP	Baz Whale	543	23.2	N/A
Labour	David Alan Oakensen	385	16.4	N/A
Majority		253	10.8	N/A
Turnout		2,345	27	N/A
Registered electors		8,561		
Liberal Democrats win (new seat)				

=== Frome North ===
Frome North
Party	Candidate	Votes	%	±%
Liberal Democrats	Sam Robin Phripp	1,047	37.3	+0.1
Conservative	Peter Francis John *	1,002	35.7	–10.9
UKIP	Martin Alan Howard	455	16.2	N/A
Labour	Catherine Richardson	302	10.8	+5.5
Majority		45	1.6	–7.3
Turnout		2,806	39	–
Registered electors		7,150		
Liberal Democrats gain from Conservative		Swing		

=== Frome West ===
Frome West
Party	Candidate	Votes	%	±%
Liberal Democrats	Derek Fredrick Edmond Tanswell	1,010	42.2	N/A
UKIP	Martyn Peter Rollinson	474	19.8	N/A
Conservative	Mike Rideout	464	19.4	N/A
Labour	Theresa Mary Clark	447	18.7	N/A
Majority		536	22.4	N/A
Turnout		2,395	29	N/A
Registered electors		8,273		
Liberal Democrats win (new seat)				

=== Glastonbury & Street ===
Glastonbury & Street (2 seats)
Party	Candidate	Votes	%	±%
Conservative	Terry William Edwin Napper *	1,639	30.3	N/A
Liberal Democrats	Alan Frederick Gloak *	1,419	26.2	N/A
Conservative	George Steer	1,360	–	
UKIP	Steve Lukins	1,217	22.5	N/A
Liberal Democrats	Bryan Albert Beha	1,149	–	
UKIP	Glen Mountford Tucker	982	–	
Green	Jon Cousins	668	12.3	N/A
Green	Emma George	623	–	
Labour	Belinda Jane Malcahy	473	8.7	N/A
Labour	John David Newick	404	–	
Turnout				
Registered electors		15,826		
Conservative win (new seat)				
Liberal Democrats win (new seat)				

=== Highbridge & Burnham South ===
Highbridge & Burnham South
Party	Candidate	Votes	%	±%
Conservative	John Woodman *	737	37.1	–2.2
Liberal Democrats	Helen Groves	587	29.5	+0.7
Labour	Ricky Holcombe	335	16.8	+6.2
Independent	Purple Watkins	202	10.2	N/A
Green	David Taylor	128	6.4	N/A
Majority		150	7.5	–2.9
Turnout		1,989	27	–12
Registered electors		7,367		
Conservative hold		Swing		

=== Huntspill ===
Huntspill
Party	Candidate	Votes	%	±%
Conservative	Mark Healey *	1,100	43.5	–13.2
UKIP	John Everitt	829	32.8	N/A
Labour	Alexa Bartlett	325	12.9	N/A
Liberal Democrats	Alan Miller	274	10.8	–32.5
Majority		271	10.7	–2.7
Turnout		2,528	35	–12
Registered electors		7,313		
Conservative hold		Swing		

=== Ilminster ===
Ilminster
Party	Candidate	Votes	%	±%
Conservative	Linda Patricia Vijeh	956	29.1	–19.1
UKIP	Don Kinder	945	28.8	N/A
Liberal Democrats	Jo Dawson	844	25.7	–26.1
Green	Peter Lansdown	279	8.5	N/A
Labour	Paul John Sellers	214	6.5	N/A
English Democrat	Stephen Wright	42	1.3	N/A
Majority		11	0.3	N/A
Turnout		3,280	40	–7
Registered electors		8,295		
Conservative gain from Liberal Democrats		Swing		

=== King Alfred ===
King Alfred
Party	Candidate	Votes	%	±%
Conservative	David Huxtable *	1,303	46.1	–6.2
UKIP	Russell Wright	533	18.9	N/A
Liberal Democrats	Rosemary Hasler	404	14.3	–10.4
Labour	Trevor Hazelgrove	201	7.1	+1.7
Green	Charles Graham	195	6.9	N/A
Independent	Bob Cudlipp	190	6.7	–10.9
Majority		770	27.2	–0.3
Turnout		2,826	36	–16
Registered electors		7,931		
Conservative hold		Swing		

=== Lydeard ===
Lydeard
Party	Candidate	Votes	%	±%
Independent	Mike Staal Rigby	1,512	53.9	N/A
Conservative	Caroline Smeaton	895	31.9	–13.3
Liberal Democrats	Paul William Partington	278	9.9	–28.6
Labour Co-op	Jonathan Frederic Gray	118	4.2	+1.3
Majority		617	22.0	N/A
Turnout		2,803	40	–5
Registered electors		7,001		
Independent gain from Conservative		Swing		

=== Martock ===
Martock
Party	Candidate	Votes	%	±%
Liberal Democrats	John Allison Bailey *	1,078	34.4	–14.3
Conservative	Graham Harold Middleton	1,058	33.8	–7.5
UKIP	Michael Henry Canton	621	19.8	N/A
Labour	Chris Bragg	255	8.1	N/A
Green	Pamela Sellers	119	3.8	–4.3
Majority		20	0.6	–6.7
Turnout		3,131	36	–8
Registered electors		8,815		
Liberal Democrats hold		Swing		

=== Mendip Central & East ===
Mendip Central & East
Party	Candidate	Votes	%	±%
Conservative	Philip John Ham	1,156	40.2	–6.7
Liberal Democrats	Josh Burr	931	32.4	–17.4
UKIP	Barry Francis Harding	444	15.5	N/A
Labour	Alwyn Dow	196	6.8	+3.4
Green	Linda Hull	146	5.1	N/A
Majority		225	7.8	N/A
Turnout		2,873	40	–10
Registered electors		7,243		
Conservative gain from Liberal Democrats		Swing		

=== Mendip Hills ===
Mendip Hills
Party	Candidate	Votes	%	±%
Conservative	Harvey Siggs *	1,075	43.0	N/A
UKIP	Simon Smedley	636	25.5	N/A
Liberal Democrats	Christine Frances Cockroft	298	11.9	N/A
Labour	Roger Anderson	274	11.0	N/A
Green	Pete Rawlings	216	8.6	N/A
Majority		439	17.6	N/A
Turnout		2,499	33	N/A
Registered electors		7,582		
Conservative win (new seat)				

=== Mendip South ===
Mendip South
Party	Candidate	Votes	%	±%
Conservative	Nigel Woollcombe-Adams	1,196	39.2	–15.9
Liberal Democrats	Sarah Yong	976	32.0	+3.2
UKIP	Colin McNamee	546	17.9	+5.6
Green	Earl Bramley-Howard	190	6.2	N/A
Labour	Deborah Ann Towner	141	4.6	+0.8
Majority		220	7.2	–19.0
Turnout		3,049	41	–6
Registered electors		7,373		
Conservative hold		Swing		

=== Mendip West ===
Mendip West
Party	Candidate	Votes	%	±%
Conservative	Graham Noel	1,153	37.8	–9.3
Liberal Democrats	Ros Wyke	1,045	34.3	+1.8
UKIP	Les Bennett	494	16.2	N/A
Green	Kate Briton	204	6.7	–4.8
Labour Co-op	Andy Merryfield	151	5.0	+2.5
Majority		108	3.5	–11.1
Turnout		3,047	42	–7
Registered electors		7,326		
Conservative hold		Swing		

=== Minehead ===
Minehead
Party	Candidate	Votes	%	±%
UKIP	Terry Venner	765	28.0	N/A
Liberal Democrats	Marcus Kravis	645	23.6	–22.0
Conservative	Brenda Maitland-Walker *	608	22.3	–32.1
Independent	Andrew Peter Hadley	448	16.4	N/A
Labour	Lesley Culverhouse	265	9.7	N/A
Majority		120	4.4	N/A
Turnout		2,731	39	+4
Registered electors		7,085		
UKIP gain from Conservative		Swing		

=== Monkton & North Curry ===
Monkton & North Curry
Party	Candidate	Votes	%	±%
Conservative	David John Fothergill *	1,369	46.7	N/A
Liberal Democrats	Mike Marshall	778	26.5	N/A
UKIP	William Lukins	508	17.3	N/A
Labour	Phil Pinder	186	6.3	N/A
Green	Roy Snelling	91	3.1	N/A
Majority		591	20.2	N/A
Turnout		2,932	42	N/A
Registered electors		7,030		
Conservative win (new seat)				

=== North Petherton ===
North Petherton
Party	Candidate	Votes	%	±%
Conservative	Richard Brown	667	34.0	–23.4
Liberal Democrats	Bill Revans	647	33.0	+13.8
UKIP	Peter Hollings	442	22.5	N/A
Labour	Oliver Barratt	207	10.5	+2.3
Majority		20	1.0	–37.3
Turnout		1,963	32	–2
Registered electors		6,136		
Conservative hold		Swing		

=== Rowbarton & Staplegrove ===
Rowbarton & Staplegrove
Party	Candidate	Votes	%	±%
Liberal Democrats	Danny Wedderkopp *	791	32.0	N/A
Conservative	Nick Townsend	685	27.7	N/A
UKIP	Stephanie Lukins	504	20.4	N/A
Labour Co-op	Brenda Dawn Weston	353	14.3	N/A
Green	Clive Patrick Martin	140	5.7	N/A
Majority		106	4.3	N/A
Turnout		2,473	32	N/A
Registered electors		7,637		
Liberal Democrats win (new seat)				

=== Shepton Mallet ===
Shepton Mallet
Party	Candidate	Votes	%	±%
Conservative	John William Parham	775	30.3	–18.8
Liberal Democrats	Garfield Kennedy	672	26.2	–8.2
Labour	Chris Inchley	538	21.0	+4.5
UKIP	Edward Rolfe	486	19.0	N/A
Green	Ian Forster	90	3.5	N/A
Majority		103	4.0	–10.7
Turnout		2,561	31	–3
Registered electors		8,333		
Conservative hold		Swing		

=== Somerton ===
Somerton
Party	Candidate	Votes	%	±%
Conservative	Dean Douglas Ruddle	1,450	44.0	–7.6
Liberal Democrats	Julia Mary Frances Gadd	788	23.9	–24.5
UKIP	Oliver Frances Paglia	514	15.6	N/A
Green	Margaret Ruth Chambers	412	12.5	N/A
Labour	Alan Pearce	133	4.0	N/A
Majority		662	20.1	+16.9
Turnout		3,297	44	–7
Registered electors		8,333		
Conservative hold		Swing		

=== South Petherton and Islemoor ===
South Petherton and Islemoor
Party	Candidate	Votes	%	±%
Conservative	Christopher Anthony Le Hardy	1,096	33.8	N/A
Liberal Democrats	Paul Michael Maxwell	1,042	32.1	N/A
UKIP	Richard Osbourne	693	21.4	N/A
Green	Charlotte Ellen Howells	239	7.4	N/A
Labour	Martin Ronald Bailey	174	5.4	N/A
Majority		54	1.7	N/A
Turnout		3,244	40	N/A
Registered electors		8,133		
Conservative win (new seat)				

=== Taunton East ===
Taunton East
Party	Candidate	Votes	%	±%
Liberal Democrats	Simon Coles	743	38.0	–5.5
UKIP	Dorothy Baker	496	25.4	+7.5
Conservative	Aaron Tyler Miller	326	16.7	–14.0
Labour Co-op	Martin Lee Paul Jevon	285	14.6	+6.6
Green	Clare Frances Ellen Marsden	106	5.4	N/A
Majority		247	12.6	–0.2
Turnout		1,956	26	–1
Registered electors		7,652		
Liberal Democrats hold		Swing		

=== Taunton North ===
Taunton North
Party	Candidate	Votes	%	±%
Liberal Democrats	Claire Jean Gordon *	606	30.7	–6.5
UKIP	David Arthur Allen	471	23.9	+4.6
Labour	Libby Lisgo	435	22.1	+7.9
Conservative	Michael John Adkins	343	17.4	–11.9
Green	Alan William Debenham	117	5.9	N/A
Majority		135	6.8	–1.2
Turnout		1,972	26	–3
Registered electors		6,996		
Liberal Democrats hold		Swing		

=== Taunton South ===
Taunton South
Party	Candidate	Votes	%	±%
Liberal Democrats	Hazel Ruth Prior-Sankey *	1,176	42.3	–12.9
UKIP	Jacqueline Mary Smith	619	22.3	+9.1
Conservative	Stephen Nicholas David	563	20.3	+7.9
Labour	Anna Siobhan Lynch	299	10.8	+7.4
Green	Phillip Michael Dawson Bower	122	4.4	N/A
Majority		557	20.0	–6.9
Turnout		2,779	34	–4
Registered electors		8,224		
Liberal Democrats hold		Swing		

=== Upper Tone ===
Upper Tone
Party	Candidate	Votes	%	±%
Conservative	James Alexander Hunt	1,028	33.1	–13.5
Independent	Steve Ross	919	29.5	–15.5
UKIP	Christopher Chanter	612	19.7	+11.3
Labour	Ben Elkins	332	10.7	N/A
Liberal Democrats	Alice Bridges-Westcott	219	7.0	N/A
Majority		109	3.5	+1.9
Turnout		3,110	43	–6
Registered electors		7,312		
Conservative hold		Swing		

=== Watchet & Stogursey ===
Watchet & Stogursey
Party	Candidate	Votes	%	±%
Independent	Hugh Davies	1,062	39.1	N/A
Conservative	Chris Morgan	801	29.5	N/A
UKIP	Susan Linda Bamford	543	20.0	N/A
Labour	Alan Bond	313	11.5	N/A
Majority		261	9.6	N/A
Turnout		2,719	36	N/A
Registered electors		7,572		
Independent win (new seat)				

=== Wellington ===
Wellington
Party	Candidate	Votes	%	±%
Labour	Andrew James Govier *	1,583	50.9	+0.8
Conservative	Andrew Paul Sully	627	20.1	–13.4
UKIP	John Clark	617	19.8	+8.3
Liberal Democrats	Carl Bennyworth	196	6.3	N/A
Green	Zoe Ainsworth-Grigg	89	2.9	N/A
Majority		956	30.7	+14.1
Turnout		3,112	36	–8
Registered electors		8,669		
Labour hold		Swing		

=== Wells ===
Wells
Party	Candidate	Votes	%	±%
Conservative	John Derek Osman *	1,382	40.7	–8.0
Liberal Democrats	Danny Unwin	879	25.9	–6.6
UKIP	Ian Edmund Kealey	502	14.8	N/A
Labour	Colin Michael Price	424	12.5	+6.9
Green	Maddy Milnes	211	6.2	–2.6
Majority		503	14.8	–1.3
Turnout		3,398	41	–7
Registered electors		8,391		
Conservative hold		Swing		

=== Wincanton & Bruton ===
Wincanton & Bruton
Party	Candidate	Votes	%	±%
Conservative	Anna Mary Groskop *	1,555	53.2	–4.8
Liberal Democrats	Abi Baker	549	18.8	–11.8
UKIP	Brenda May Hamlin	493	16.9	N/A
Labour	Tim Daniel	193	6.6	N/A
Green	Shane Antony Adams	131	4.5	–6.8
Majority		1,006	34.4	+7.0
Turnout		2,921	35	–11
Registered electors		8,313		
Conservative hold		Swing		

=== Yeovil Central ===
Yeovil Central
Party	Candidate	Votes	%	±%
UKIP	Alan Ivor Dimmick	765	34.1	N/A
Liberal Democrats	Peter Gubbins *	748	33.4	N/A
Conservative	David John Byrne	489	21.8	N/A
Labour	Terry Lavin	239	10.7	N/A
Majority		17	0.8	N/A
Turnout		2,241	29	N/A
Registered electors		7,611		
UKIP win (new seat)				

=== Yeovil East ===
Yeovil East
Party	Candidate	Votes	%	±%
Liberal Democrats	Tony Lock *	833	41.1	–10.9
UKIP	Godfrey Davey	724	35.8	N/A
Labour	Sharon Stafford	272	13.4	+5.0
Conservative	Paul Bradly	196	9.7	–13.6
Majority		109	5.4	–23.3
Turnout		2,025	27	–
Registered electors		7,585		
Liberal Democrats hold		Swing		

=== Yeovil South ===
Yeovil South
Party	Candidate	Votes	%	±%
Liberal Democrats	Dave Greene *	992	38.6	–9.9
Conservative	Tom Parsley	632	24.6	–19.4
UKIP	James Terence Rouch	605	23.5	N/A
Labour	Terry Ledlie	232	9.0	N/A
Green	Katy Limmer	112	4.4	N/A
Majority		360	14.0	+9.5
Turnout		2,573	33	–7
Registered electors		7,914		
Liberal Democrats hold		Swing		

=== Yeovil West ===
Yeovil West
Party	Candidate	Votes	%	±%
Liberal Democrats	Jane Lock	779	40.2	–4.1
UKIP	Tony Turner	486	25.1	N/A
Conservative	Ashley Owen Strelling	386	19.9	–17.1
Labour	Sue Pitman	190	9.8	+3.6
Green	Martin Charles William Day	95	4.9	–4.0
Majority		293	15.1	+7.9
Turnout		1,936	29	–6
Registered electors		6,597		
Liberal Democrats hold		Swing		
