= 2009 Somerset County Council election =

2009 UK local government election

← 2005	4 June 2009	2013 →

All 58 seats to Somerset County Council 30 seats needed for a majority
	First party	Second party	Third party
	Con	LD	Lab
Party	Conservative	Liberal Democrats	Labour
Last election	24 seats, 39.9%	30 seats, 41.2%	4 seats, 13.5%
Seats won	35	21	2
Seat change	▲11	▼9	▼2
Popular vote	78,036	60,877	7,811
Percentage	46.5%	36.3%	4.7%
Swing	▲6.6%	▼4.9%	▼8.8%
- 2009 local election results in Somerset
Council control before election
Liberal Democrats
Council control after election
Conservative

An election to Somerset County Council took place on 4 June 2009 as part of the 2009 United Kingdom local elections, having been delayed from 7 May, to coincide with elections to the European Parliament. The result brought to an end 16 years of Liberal Democrat rule to a Conservative controlled administration. 58 councillors were elected from various electoral divisions, which returned one county councillor each. Members were elected by the first-past-the-post voting system for a four-year term of office. This was the last election before the number of seats was cut to 55 for the 2013 election. With a total of 58 seats being reduced to 55 for the next election.

All locally registered electors (British, Irish, Commonwealth and European Union citizens) who were aged 18 or over on Thursday 2 May 2013 were entitled to vote in the local elections. Those who were temporarily away from their ordinary address (for example, away working, on holiday, in student accommodation or in hospital) were also entitled to vote in the local elections, although those who had moved abroad and registered as overseas electors cannot vote in the local elections. It is possible to register to vote at more than one address (such as a university student who had a term-time address and lives at home during holidays) at the discretion of the local Electoral Register Office, but it remains an offence to vote more than once in the same local government election.

== Summary ==
The Liberal Democrats lost overall control of the council to the Conservatives who went on to form a majority administration. The Liberal Democrat group became the council's official opposition. Meanwhile the Labour Party had their number of seats halved from 4 to 2. No independents or candidates from other parties were elected as councillors.

== Overall results ==
Somerset County Council election, 2009
Party	Seats	Gains	Losses	Net gain/loss	Seats %	Votes %	Votes	+/−
Conservative	35	11	0	+11	60.5	46.5	78,036	+6.6
Liberal Democrats	21	0	9	–9	36.0	36.3	60,877	–4.9
Labour	2	0	2	–2	3.5	4.7	7,811	–8.8
Independent	0	0	0	0	0.0	4.6	7,805	+1.8
UKIP	0	0	0	0	0.0	4.2	6,980	+3.1
Green	0	0	0	0	0.0	2.8	4,744	+1.4
BNP	0	0	0	0	0.0	0.9	1,441	
Senior Citizens	0	0	0	0	0.0	0.1	158	

== Results by division ==
The candidates in bold were elected councillors on 4 June 2009.

=== Blackdown & Wellington East ===
Blackdown & Wellington East
Party	Candidate	Votes	%	±%
**Liberal Democrats**	**Ross Longhurst Henley ***	**1,236**	**44.2**	**–7.9**
Conservative	John Bryan Thorne	1,227	43.9	–4.0
UKIP	Ann Morris	332	11.9	N/A
Majority		9	0.3	–4.0
Turnout		2,795	47	–25
Registered electors		6,037		
Liberal Democrats **hold**		Swing		

=== Blackmoor Vale ===
Blackmoor Vale
Party	Candidate	Votes	%	±%
**Conservative**	**William Wallace ***	**1,880**	**59.6**	**+20.6**
Liberal Democrats	Jane Lock	1,275	40.4	+4.6
Majority		605	19.2	+16.0
Turnout		3,155	48	–24
Registered electors		6,696		
Conservative **hold**		Swing		

=== Brent ===
Brent
Party	Candidate	Votes	%	±%
**Conservative**	**Alan John Ham ***	**2,108**	**69.9**	**+14.8**
Liberal Democrats	Anthony Ernest Gore	744	24.7	–4.7
Labour	Sheila Rachel Forrester	162	5.4	–10.1
Majority		1,364	45.3	+19.6
Turnout		3,014	46	–18
Registered electors		6,539		
Conservative **hold**		Swing		

=== Bridgwater East & Bawdrip ===
Bridgwater East & Bawdrip
Party	Candidate	Votes	%	±%
**Conservative**	**David Hall**	**1,102**	**58.6**	**+28.0**
Liberal Democrats	Joshua John Schwieso	401	21.3	–2.3
Labour	Roger John Lavers	379	20.1	–17.0
Majority		701	37.2	N/A
Turnout		1,882	30	–26
Registered electors		6,313		
Conservative **gain** from Labour		Swing		

=== Bridgwater North & Central ===
Bridgwater North & Central
Party	Candidate	Votes	%	±%
**Labour**	**David Peter Loveridge ***	**489**	**30.1**	**–26.8**
Conservative	Lance John Duddridge	469	28.8	+8.6
UKIP	Keith Ronald Hart	251	15.4	N/A
Liberal Democrats	Janice Joanna Somers Beasley	223	13.7	–9.2
BNP	Roger Cyril Bennett	144	8.9	N/A
Independent	Roy Christopher Franklin	50	3.1	N/A
Majority		20	1.2	–32.7
Turnout		1,626	25	–22
Registered electors		6,525		
Labour **hold**		Swing		

=== Bridgwater South ===
Bridgwater South
Party	Candidate	Votes	%	±%
**Conservative**	**Stephen John Gill**	**495**	**35.5**	**+8.3**
Labour	Pat Parker *	463	33.2	–13.4
Liberal Democrats	Daniel Alexander Kelly	436	31.3	+5.1
Majority		32	2.3	N/A
Turnout		1,394	23	–27
Registered electors		5,943		
Conservative **gain** from Labour		Swing	10.4	

=== Bridgwater West ===
Bridgwater West
Party	Candidate	Votes	%	±%
**Conservative**	**Ann Elizabeth Bown ***	**1,100**	**45.8**	**+8.3**
Labour	Graham John Granter	515	21.4	–14.8
Liberal Democrats	Peter Ian Johnstone	440	18.3	–8.0
Independent	Anne Louise Heritage	349	14.5	N/A
Majority		585	24.3	+23.0
Turnout		2,404	32	–28
Registered electors		7,483		
Conservative **hold**		Swing		

=== Burnham on Sea North ===
Burnham on Sea North
Party	Candidate	Votes	%	±%
**Conservative**	**Peter Laurence Burridge-Clayton**	**1,561**	**54.5**	**+9.8**
Liberal Democrats	Mike Mansfield	1,301	45.5	+9.0
Majority		260	9.1	+0.9
Turnout		2,862	48	–17
Registered electors		5,889		
Conservative **hold**		Swing		

=== Cannington ===
Cannington
Party	Candidate	Votes	%	±%
**Conservative**	**John Edney ***	**2,131**	**62.1**	**+4.9**
Liberal Democrats	Alan James Beasley	782	22.8	–20.0
Green	Anna Madeline Hammond	516	15.0	N/A
Majority		1,349	39.3	+24.9
Turnout		3,429	44	–23
Registered electors		7,700		
Conservative **hold**		Swing		

=== Castle Cary ===
Castle Cary
Party	Candidate	Votes	%	±%
**Conservative**	**Bob Little**	**1,816**	**50.1**	**+1.8**
Liberal Democrats	Henry Hobhouse *	1,810	49.9	+1.4
Majority		6	0.2	N/A
Turnout		3,626	56	–20
Registered electors		6,541		
Conservative **gain** from Liberal Democrats		Swing	0.2	

=== Chard North ===
Chard North
Party	Candidate	Votes	%	±%
**Liberal Democrats**	**Jenny Kenton**	**1,652**	**45.8**	**+2.5**
Conservative	Martin John Wale	1,468	40.7	+0.9
BNP	Fay Williams	368	10.2	N/A
Labour	Tom McGee	119	3.3	–6.6
Majority		184	5.1	+1.6
Turnout		3,607	46	–20
Registered electors		7,831		
Liberal Democrats **hold**		Swing		

=== Chard South ===
Chard South
Party	Candidate	Votes	%	±%
**Liberal Democrats**	**Jill Shortland ***	**1,384**	**52.1**	**+7.0**
Conservative	Linda Patricia Vijeh	911	34.3	N/A
BNP	Robert William Baehr	362	13.6	N/A
Majority		473	17.8	+8.6
Turnout		2,657	41	–24
Registered electors		6,480		
Liberal Democrats **hold**		Swing		

=== Cheddar ===
Cheddar
Party	Candidate	Votes	%	±%
**Conservative**	**Dawn Mary Hill ***	**1,326**	**45.5**	**–2.7**
Liberal Democrats	Suzanne Mary Green	1,008	34.6	–0.1
UKIP	David Terence Willmott	471	16.2	N/A
Independent	Christopher Byrne	108	3.7	N/A
Majority		318	10.9	–2.6
Turnout		2,913	46	–22
Registered electors		6,334		
Conservative **hold**		Swing		

=== Coker ===
Coker
Party	Candidate	Votes	%	±%
**Liberal Democrats**	**Cathy Bakewell ***	**1,454**	**45.5**	**–6.7**
Conservative	Angus McPhee	1,365	42.7	+5.7
Green	Peter John Bysouth	249	7.8	–2.6
Independent	Nick Hester	131	4.1	N/A
Majority		89	2.8	–12.8
Turnout		3,199	50	–22
Registered electors		6,475		
Liberal Democrats **hold**		Swing		

=== Crewkerne ===
Crewkerne
Party	Candidate	Votes	%	±%
**Liberal Democrats**	**John Dyke ***	**1,634**	**52.7**	**–2.0**
Conservative	Marcus Morton Barrett	1,092	35.2	+4.1
Green	Ben Keiron Hartshorn	377	12.1	+5.7
Majority		542	17.5	–7.1
Turnout		3,103	49	+4
Registered electors		6,380		
Liberal Democrats **hold**		Swing		

=== Curry Rivel ===
Curry Rivel
Party	Candidate	Votes	%	±%
**Conservative**	**Derek Ian Nelson ***	**1,787**	**57.6**	**+0.6**
Liberal Democrats	Ray Warner	959	30.9	–12.1
Green	Margaret Ruth Chambers	358	11.5	N/A
Majority		828	16.7	+2.6
Turnout		3,104	49	–23
Registered electors		6,410		
Conservative **hold**		Swing		

=== Dulverton & Exmoor ===
Dulverton & Exmoor
Party	Candidate	Votes	%	±%
**Conservative**	**Frances Mary Nicholson**	**1,687**	**54.6**	**–12.9**
Independent	Jan Ross	1,405	45.4	N/A
Majority		282	9.1	–35.9
Turnout		3,092	53	–22
Registered electors		5,902		
Conservative **hold**		Swing		

=== Dunster ===
Dunster
Party	Candidate	Votes	%	±%
**Conservative**	**Christine Mary Lawrence ***	**1,451**	**64.1**	**+8.8**
Liberal Democrats	Alison Gunner	813	35.9	+6.7
Majority		638	28.2	+2.1
Turnout		2,264	44	–19
Registered electors		5,314		
Conservative **hold**		Swing		

=== Frome North ===
Frome North
Party	Candidate	Votes	%	±%
**Conservative**	**Peter Francis John**	**1,299**	**46.1**	**+10.8**
Liberal Democrats	Christine Cockroft	1,048	37.2	–0.1
Green	Rebecca Amani Yeo	320	11.4	N/A
Labour	Alwyn Dow	149	5.3	–11.8
Majority		251	8.9	N/A
Turnout		2,816	39	–27
Registered electors		7,192		
Conservative **gain** from Liberal Democrats		Swing		

=== Frome Selwood ===
Frome Selwood
Party	Candidate	Votes	%	±%
**Liberal Democrats**	**Maggy Daniell**	**1,192**	**54.4**	**+9.8**
Conservative	Charles Richard Seymour Wood	821	37.4	+6.2
Labour	Theresa Mary Clark	180	8.2	–16.0
Majority		371	16.9	+3.5
Turnout		2,193	33	–28
Registered electors		6,642		
Liberal Democrats **hold**		Swing		

=== Frome South ===
Frome South
Party	Candidate	Votes	%	±%
**Liberal Democrats**	**Alvin John Horsfall ***	**1,313**	**59.5**	**+11.9**
Conservative	Pam Lee	664	30.1	+3.3
Labour	David Alan Oakensen	229	10.4	–15.2
Majority		649	29.4	+8.6
Turnout		2,206	32	–29
Registered electors		6,889		
Liberal Democrats **hold**		Swing		

=== Glastonbury ===
Glastonbury
Party	Candidate	Votes	%	±%
**Liberal Democrats**	**Alan Frederick Gloak ***	**1,366**	**48.3**	**–3.9**
Conservative	George Steer	1,304	46.1	+13.7
Labour	William George Roberts	158	5.6	–9.8
Majority		62	2.2	–17.6
Turnout		2,828	42	–23
Registered electors		6,743		
Liberal Democrats **hold**		Swing		

=== Highbridge & Burnham on Sea South ===
Highbridge & Burnham on Sea South
Party	Candidate	Votes	%	±%
**Conservative**	**John Charles Woodman**	**1,092**	**39.3**	**+4.9**
Liberal Democrats	Rosemarie Parsons *	802	28.8	–6.4
UKIP	Mick Lucas	592	21.3	N/A
Labour	Joanna Noreen Burridge-Clayton	294	10.6	–19.8
Majority		290	10.4	N/A
Turnout		2,780	39	–22
Registered electors		7,193		
Conservative **gain** from Liberal Democrats		Swing		

=== Huntspill ===
Huntspill
Party	Candidate	Votes	%	±%
**Conservative**	**Mark Healey ***	**1,535**	**56.7**	**+10.9**
Liberal Democrats	Joe Leach	1,173	43.3	+13.6
Majority		362	13.4	–2.7
Turnout		2,708	47	–21
Registered electors		5,712		
Conservative **hold**		Swing		

=== Ilchester ===
Ilchester
Party	Candidate	Votes	%	±%
**Liberal Democrats**	**Sam Crabb ***	**1,708**	**51.0**	**+3.0**
Conservative	Colin Winder	1,392	41.6	+9.6
Independent	Michael William Bestwick	250	7.5	N/A
Majority		316	9.4	–6.6
Turnout		3,350	34	–34
Registered electors		9,840		
Liberal Democrats **hold**		Swing		

=== Ilminster ===
Ilminster
Party	Candidate	Votes	%	±%
**Liberal Democrats**	**Kim Tracey Turner**	**1,560**	**51.8**	**+6.6**
Conservative	Martin Gwillym Rawstorne	1,450	48.2	+4.4
Majority		110	3.7	+2.4
Turnout		3,010	47	–29
Registered electors		6,569		
Liberal Democrats **hold**		Swing		

=== King Alfred ===
King Alfred
Party	Candidate	Votes	%	±%
**Conservative**	**David John Huxtable ***	**1,817**	**52.3**	**–1.2**
Liberal Democrats	Rosemary Hasler	860	24.7	–6.2
Independent	Bob Cudlipp	610	17.6	N/A
Labour	Andy Merryfield	188	5.4	–10.2
Majority		957	27.5	+4.9
Turnout		3,475	52	–20
Registered electors		6,667		
Conservative **hold**		Swing		

=== Langport ===
Langport
Party	Candidate	Votes	%	±%
**Conservative**	**Derek Norman Lander Yeomans ***	**1,621**	**52.4**	**+0.7**
Liberal Democrats	Julia Mary Frances Gadd	1,470	47.6	–0.7
Majority		151	4.9	+1.4
Turnout		3,091	50	–22
Registered electors		6,345		
Conservative **hold**		Swing		

=== Lydeard ===
Lydeard
Party	Candidate	Votes	%	±%
**Conservative**	**John Edward Wilkins**	**1,313**	**45.2**	**–6.2**
Liberal Democrats	Paul William Partington	1,118	38.5	–10.1
UKIP	Fran Evens	392	13.5	N/A
Labour	Jonathan Frederic Gray	84	2.9	N/A
Majority		195	6.7	+3.8
Turnout		2,907	45	–25
Registered electors		6,504		
Conservative **hold**		Swing		

=== Martock ===
Martock
Party	Candidate	Votes	%	±%
**Liberal Democrats**	**John Allison Bailey**	**1,451**	**48.7**	**–5.5**
Conservative	Graham Harold Middleton	1,232	41.3	+4.4
Green	Alexander Begg Lawrie	242	8.1	–0.8
Independent	Rob Crocker	55	1.8	N/A
Majority		219	7.3	–10.0
Turnout		2,980	44	–26
Registered electors		6,744		
Liberal Democrats **hold**		Swing		

=== Mendip Central & East ===
Mendip Central & East
Party	Candidate	Votes	%	±%
**Liberal Democrats**	**Gloria Cawood ***	**1,502**	**49.8**	**+2.4**
Conservative	Ken Lloyd	1,415	46.9	+6.1
Labour	Ken Hurrell	102	3.4	–8.4
Majority		87	2.9	–3.7
Turnout		3,019	50	–23
Registered electors		5,994		
Liberal Democrats **hold**		Swing		

=== Mendip North East ===
Mendip North East
Party	Candidate	Votes	%	±%
**Conservative**	**Matthew James Ellis**	**1,796**	**55.7**	**+11.4**
Liberal Democrats	Claire Fleming	1,285	39.9	+0.8
Labour	John Edward Gilham	143	4.4	–12.1
Majority		511	15.8	+10.6
Turnout		3,224	51	–22
Registered electors		6,329		
Conservative **hold**		Swing		

=== Mendip North West ===
Mendip North West
Party	Candidate	Votes	%	±%
**Conservative**	**Harvey Siggs ***	**1,530**	**50.6**	**+1.4**
Liberal Democrats	Tony Robbins	792	26.2	–10.5
UKIP	Gwyn Bedford Thomas	506	16.7	N/A
Labour	Roger William Anderson	195	6.5	–7.7
Majority		738	24.4	+11.9
Turnout		3,023	43	–28
Registered electors		7,040		
Conservative **hold**		Swing		

=== Mendip South ===
Mendip South
Party	Candidate	Votes	%	±%
**Conservative**	**Ken Maddock ***	**1,923**	**55.1**	**+5.0**
Liberal Democrats	Robert John Reed	1,007	28.8	–11.2
UKIP	Colin Joseph McNamee	430	12.3	N/A
Labour	Terry Morgan	131	3.8	–6.0
Majority		916	26.2	+16.1
Turnout		3,491	47	–25
Registered electors		7,462		
Conservative **hold**		Swing		

=== Mendip West ===
Mendip West
Party	Candidate	Votes	%	±%
**Conservative**	**Ron Forrest ***	**1,291**	**47.1**	**+1.1**
Liberal Democrats	Christopher Ralph William Richard Inge	890	32.5	–12.0
Green	Kate Briton	316	11.5	N/A
Independent	Leslie Matthew Bennett	177	6.5	N/A
Labour	Peter John Trueman	68	2.5	–7.0
Majority		401	14.6	+13.2
Turnout		2,742	49	–21
Registered electors		5,620		
Conservative **hold**		Swing		

=== Minehead ===
Minehead
Party	Candidate	Votes	%	±%
**Conservative**	**Brenda Maitland-Walker**	**1,495**	**54.4**	**+30.4**
Liberal Democrats	Ian Galloway *	1,251	45.6	+19.2
Majority		244	8.9	N/A
Turnout		2,746	34	–30
Registered electors		8,000		
Conservative **gain** from Liberal Democrats		Swing		

=== North Curry ===
North Curry
Party	Candidate	Votes	%	±%
**Conservative**	**David John Andrew Fothergill**	**2,092**	**57.4**	**+10.5**
Liberal Democrats	John Roskruge Hassall	1,027	28.2	–15.6
UKIP	William James Lukins	525	14.4	N/A
Majority		1,065	29.2	+26.0
Turnout		3,644	49	–28
Registered electors		7,553		
Conservative **hold**		Swing		

=== North Petherton ===
North Petherton
Party	Candidate	Votes	%	±%
**Conservative**	**Derek Stanley Alder ***	**1,591**	**57.4**	**+3.5**
Liberal Democrats	Karen Jane Revans	531	19.2	–26.9
Green	Charles Graham	421	15.2	N/A
Labour	Pat Morley	227	8.2	N/A
Majority		1,060	38.3	+30.5
Turnout		2,770	34	–34
Registered electors		6,628		
Conservative **hold**		Swing		

=== Shepton Mallet ===
Shepton Mallet
Party	Candidate	Votes	%	±%
**Conservative**	**Margaret Robinson ***	**1,196**	**49.1**	**+11.7**
Liberal Democrats	Martin Lovell	838	34.4	+0.8
Labour	Chris Inchley	403	16.5	–12.5
Majority		358	14.7	+10.9
Turnout		2,437	34	–29
Registered electors		7,207		
Conservative **hold**		Swing		

=== Somerton ===
Somerton
Party	Candidate	Votes	%	±%
**Conservative**	**Jimmy Zouche**	**1,794**	**51.6**	**+11.7**
Liberal Democrats	Pauline Clarke *	1,684	48.4	–6.8
Majority		110	3.2	N/A
Turnout		3,478	51	–22
Registered electors		6,841		
Conservative **gain** from Liberal Democrats		Swing		

=== South Petherton ===
South Petherton
Party	Candidate	Votes	%	±%
**Conservative**	**Anne Larpent**	**1,341**	**43.3**	**+5.1**
Liberal Democrats	Brian Charles Smith	1,247	40.3	–8.9
Independent	Ian James Greenfield	285	9.2	N/A
Green	Michael Bernard Fox	222	7.2	+0.8
Majority		94	3.0	N/A
Turnout		3,095	52	–19
Registered electors		6,012		
Conservative **gain** from Liberal Democrats		Swing		

=== Staplegrove ===
Staplegrove
Party	Candidate	Votes	%	±%
**Conservative**	**Elaine Waymouth**	**1,320**	**48.0**	**–0.2**
Liberal Democrats	Raymond Tully *	1,113	40.5	–11.3
UKIP	David Thomas	317	11.5	N/A
Majority		207	7.5	N/A
Turnout		2,750	43	–27
Registered electors		6,313		
Conservative **gain** from Liberal Democrats		Swing		

=== Street ===
Street
Party	Candidate	Votes	%	±%
**Conservative**	**Terry William Edwin Napper**	**952**	**30.4**	**+0.6**
Liberal Democrats	Jim Mochnacz *	850	27.1	–22.0
Independent	Lloyd Hughes	809	25.8	N/A
UKIP	John Leo Monaghan	334	10.7	N/A
BNP	Dick Beasley	190	6.1	N/A
Majority		102	3.3	N/A
Turnout		3,135	37	–25
Registered electors		8,393		
Conservative **gain** from Liberal Democrats		Swing		

=== Taunton & Trull ===
Taunton & Trull
Party	Candidate	Votes	%	±%
**Conservative**	**Stephen Henry Martin-Scott ***	**1,519**	**47.1**	**–4.4**
Liberal Democrats	Frederick Alan Wedderkopp	1,330	41.2	–7.3
UKIP	Barry Victor Morris	281	8.7	N/A
Labour	Doug Eckhart	96	3.0	N/A
Majority		189	5.9	+2.8
Turnout		3,226	55	–20
Registered electors		5,923		
Conservative **hold**		Swing		

=== Taunton East ===
Taunton East
Party	Candidate	Votes	%	±%
**Liberal Democrats**	**Steve Brooks ***	**959**	**43.5**	**–5.7**
Conservative	Linda Susan Elliott	676	30.7	+0.6
UKIP	Bobby Fleming	394	17.9	N/A
Labour	Colin Croad	176	8.0	–12.8
Majority		283	12.8	–6.3
Turnout		2,205	27	–29
Registered electors		8,126		
Liberal Democrats **hold**		Swing		

=== Taunton Fairwater ===
Taunton Fairwater
Party	Candidate	Votes	%	±%
**Liberal Democrats**	**Danny Wedderkopp**	**1,014**	**44.2**	**–5.8**
Conservative	Michael Pether	791	34.5	+1.6
UKIP	Dorothy Rose Baker	327	14.2	N/A
Labour	Libby Lisgo	164	7.1	–10.0
Majority		223	9.7	–7.4
Turnout		2,296	37	–28
Registered electors		6,309		
Liberal Democrats **hold**		Swing		

=== Taunton North ===
Taunton North
Party	Candidate	Votes	%	±%
**Liberal Democrats**	**Claire Jean Gordon ***	**791**	**37.2**	**–10.1**
Conservative	Richard Frederick Dickinson	622	29.3	+3.6
UKIP	Stephanie Ann Lukins	410	19.3	N/A
Labour	Martin Lee Paul Jevon	302	14.2	–12.8
Majority		169	8.0	–12.3
Turnout		2,125	29	–32
Registered electors		7,317		
Liberal Democrats **hold**		Swing		

=== Taunton South ===
Taunton South
Party	Candidate	Votes	%	±%
**Liberal Democrats**	**Hazel Ruth Prior-Sankey ***	**1,563**	**55.2**	**+3.6**
Conservative	Krystal Bonnie Painter	800	28.2	–5.6
UKIP	John Calascione	375	13.2	N/A
Labour	Brenda Weston	96	3.4	–11.3
Majority		763	26.9	+9.1
Turnout		2,834	38	–28
Registered electors		7,417		
Liberal Democrats **hold**		Swing		

=== Taunton West ===
Taunton West
Party	Candidate	Votes	%	±%
**Liberal Democrats**	**Alan Paul**	**1,498**	**48.6**	**–5.7**
Conservative	Nick James	1,070	34.7	+1.6
UKIP	Isabella Crawford Henderson	407	13.2	N/A
Labour	Matthew Ravenhill	106	3.4	–9.3
Majority		428	13.9	–7.3
Turnout		3,081	44	–28
Registered electors		7,132		
Liberal Democrats **hold**		Swing		

=== Upper Tone ===
Upper Tone
Party	Candidate	Votes	%	±%
**Conservative**	**Tony McMahon**	**1,447**	**46.6**	**–14.5**
Independent	Steve Ross	1,397	45.0	N/A
UKIP	Charlene Suzanne Sherriff	261	8.4	N/A
Majority		50	1.6	–18.7
Turnout		3,105	49	–28
Registered electors		6,394		
Conservative **hold**		Swing		

=== Watchet & Quantocks ===
Watchet & Quantocks
Party	Candidate	Votes	%	±%
**Conservative**	**Anthony Henry Trollope-Bellew ***	**1,779**	**43.8**	**+7.2**
Independent	Hugh John William Davies	1,575	38.8	+3.6
Liberal Democrats	Anthony Charles Bowden	401	9.9	–3.5
Green	Ralph Michael Hammond	309	7.6	N/A
Majority		204	5.0	+3.6
Turnout		4,064	47	–22
Registered electors		8,693		
Conservative **hold**		Swing		

=== Wellington ===
Wellington
Party	Candidate	Votes	%	±%
**Labour**	**Andrew James Govier ***	**1,634**	**50.1**	**+8.3**
Conservative	James Alexander Hunt	1,094	33.5	+4.3
UKIP	John William Davison	375	11.5	N/A
Senior Citizens	Frank Bishop	158	4.8	N/A
Majority		540	16.6	+4.0
Turnout		3,261	44	–25
Registered electors		7,418		
Labour **hold**		Swing		

=== Wells ===
Wells
Party	Candidate	Votes	%	±%
**Conservative**	**John Derek Osman ***	**1,979**	**48.7**	**+7.7**
Liberal Democrats	Danny Unwin	1,323	32.5	–7.5
Green	Phil Rogers	359	8.8	N/A
Labour	Colin Michael Price	227	5.6	–13.4
BNP	Harry Boyce	178	4.4	N/A
Majority		656	16.1	+15.1
Turnout		4,066	48	–22
Registered electors		8,365		
Conservative **hold**		Swing		

=== Wincanton & Bruton ===
Wincanton & Bruton
Party	Candidate	Votes	%	±%
**Conservative**	**Anna Mary Groskop**	**2,118**	**58.0**	**+14.3**
Liberal Democrats	Justin Paul Robinson *	1,118	30.6	–13.6
Green	David George Robert Carnegie	414	11.3	+3.1
Majority		1,000	27.4	N/A
Turnout		3,650	46	–23
Registered electors		7,954		
Conservative **gain** from Liberal Democrats		Swing		

=== Yeovil East ===
Yeovil East
Party	Candidate	Votes	%	±%
**Liberal Democrats**	**Tony Lock**	**1,062**	**52.0**	**–11.4**
Conservative	Paul Bradly	476	23.3	+1.7
Green	Martin Ronald Bailey	225	11.0	N/A
Labour	Bill Byrd	172	8.4	N/A
Independent	Kay Bryan	107	5.2	–2.1
Majority		586	28.7	–13.1
Turnout		2,042	27	–25
Registered electors		7,526		
Liberal Democrats **hold**		Swing		

=== Yeovil North & Central ===
Yeovil North & Central
Party	Candidate	Votes	%	±%
**Liberal Democrats**	**Peter Arnold Gubbins**	**1,269**	**48.9**	**–3.6**
Conservative	Nick Rousell	736	28.4	+2.0
BNP	Bruce Jeremy Cowd	199	7.7	N/A
Green	Katherine Anne Limmer	185	7.1	N/A
Independent	Joe Conway	119	4.6	N/A
Independent	Sylvia Louise Hester	85	3.3	N/A
Majority		533	20.6	–5.5
Turnout		2,593	34	–22
Registered electors		7,597		
Liberal Democrats **hold**		Swing		

=== Yeovil South ===
Yeovil South
Party	Candidate	Votes	%	±%
**Liberal Democrats**	**Dave Greene ***	**1,305**	**48.5**	**+1.0**
Conservative	Gerald John William Boord	1,184	44.0	+10.5
Independent	Mark Gordon Lambden	117	4.4	N/A
Independent	John Grana	82	3.1	N/A
Majority		121	4.5	–9.5
Turnout		2,688	40	–26
Registered electors		6,803		
Liberal Democrats **hold**		Swing		

=== Yeovil West ===
Yeovil West
Party	Candidate	Votes	%	±%
**Liberal Democrats**	**Tim Carroll**	**1,147**	**44.3**	**–6.3**
Conservative	Ash Strelling	960	37.0	+11.3
Green	Margaret Elizabeth Hamilton	231	8.9	+5.4
Labour	Alfred John Hill	160	6.2	–7.6
Independent	Simon John Hester	94	3.6	N/A
Majority		187	7.2	–17.7
Turnout		2,592	35	–22
Registered electors		7,362		
Liberal Democrats **hold**		Swing		
