= 1977 Somerset County Council election =

1977 UK local government election

← 1973	5 May 1977	1981 →

All 56 seats of Somerset County Council 29 seats needed for a majority
	Majority party	Minority party	Third party
Party	Conservative	Independent	Labour
Seats won	44	9	3
Seat change	▲8	▼2	▼4
- The County of Somerset within England
Party before election
Conservative
Elected Party
Conservative

Elections to Somerset County Council were held on Thursday, 5 May 1977, when the whole council of 56 members was up for election.

The result was that the Conservatives retained their control, winning 44 seats, a gain of eight. Independents ended with nine county councillors, a loss of two, and Labour with three, a loss of four, but the Liberals lost both their seats and ended with none.

== Election result ==
Result of Somerset County Council election, 1977
Party	Seats	Gains	Losses	Net gain/loss	Seats %	Votes %	Votes	+/−
Conservative	44	8	0	+8	78.6			
Independent	9	0	2	-2	16.1			
Labour	3	0	4	-4	5.4			
Liberal	0	0	2	-2	0.0			
