= 2017 Somerset County Council election =

2017 UK local government election

- 4 May 2017

All 55 seats to Somerset County Council 28 seats needed for a majority

	First party	Second party	Third party
Party	Conservative	Liberal Democrats	Labour
Last election	29 seats, 35.0%	18 seats, 26.1%	3 seats, 11.8%
Seats won	35	12	3
Seat change	▲6	▼6	Steady
Popular vote	78,107	52,145	15,453
Percentage	47.0%	31.4%	9.3%
Swing	▲12.0%	▲5.3%	▼2.5%
	Fourth party	Fifth party
Party	Independent	Green
Last election	2 seats, 2.9%	0 seats, 4.3%
Seats won	3	2
Seat change	▲1	▲2
Popular vote	7,814	7,822
Percentage	4.7%	4.7%
Swing	▲1.8%	▲0.4%
- 2017 Somerset County Council Election Results Map
Council control before election
Conservative
Council control after election
Conservative

The 2017 Somerset County Council election took place on 4 May 2017 as part of the 2017 local elections in the United Kingdom. All 55 councilors were elected from 54 electoral divisions, which each returned either one or two county councilors by first-past-the-post voting for a four-year term of office.

== Results summary ==
Somerset County Council election, 2017
Party	Seats	Gains	Losses	Net gain/loss	Seats %	Votes %	Votes	+/−
Conservative	35	9	3	+6	63.6	47.0	78,107	+12.0
Liberal Democrats	12	5	11	–6	21.8	31.4	52,145	+5.3
Labour	3	0	0	–	10.9	9.3	15,453	–2.5
Independent	3	1	0	+1	10.9	4.7	7,814	+1.8
Green	2	2	0	+2	3.6	4.7	7,822	+0.4
UKIP	0	0	3	–3	0.0	2.9	4,747	–17.0
Liberal	0	0	0	–	0.0	0.0	76	+0.0

== Results by division ==
=== Bishops Hull & Taunton West ===
Bishops Hull & Taunton West
Party	Candidate	Votes	%	±%
Independent	John Hunt	1,147	35.4	N/A
Liberal Democrats	Simon Nicholls	976	30.1	–5.0
Conservative	Jason Wayne Woollacott	841	26.0	–7.0
Labour	Charlie Grabham	195	6.0	–1.6
Green	Julian McLeod Mellor	80	2.5	−2.8
Majority		171	5.3	N/A
Turnout		3,239	43.3	+6.3
Registered electors		7,473		
Independent gain from Liberal Democrats		Swing		

=== Blackdown & Neroche ===
Blackdown & Neroche
Party	Candidate	Votes	%	±%
Conservative	John Bryan Thorne	1,556	47.3	+13.2
Liberal Democrats	Ross Henley *	1,414	43.0	+7.2
Labour	Madeleine Spears	189	5.7	–0.6
Green	Roy Snelling	132	4.0	–0.2
Majority		142	4.3	N/A
Turnout		3,291	40.0	+3.0
Registered electors		8,220		
Conservative gain from Liberal Democrats		Swing		

=== Blackmoor Vale ===
Blackmoor Vale
Party	Candidate	Votes	%	±%
Conservative	William Wallace *	1,905	63.1	+11.1
Liberal Democrats	Sarah Joanne Dyke	752	24.9	+9.7
Green	Oliver Hugh Arnold Dowding	188	6.2	N/A
Labour	Michael Andrew Yianni	173	5.7	–2.6
Majority		1,153	38.2	+10.7
Turnout		3,018	43.0	+6.0
Registered electors		7,025		
Conservative hold		Swing		

=== Brent ===
Brent
Party	Candidate	Votes	%	±%
Conservative	Bob Filmer	1,917	67.8	+2.5
Liberal Democrats	Tony Gore	537	19.0	–1.0
Labour	Janty Marsden	216	7.6	–7.1
UKIP	David Robert Willis	159	5.6	N/A
Majority		1,380	48.8	+3.5
Turnout		2,829	36.4	+5.4
Registered electors		7,767		
Conservative hold		Swing		

=== Bridgwater East & Bawdrip ===
Bridgwater East & Bawdrip
Party	Candidate	Votes	%	±%
Conservative	David Hall *	1,337	55.2	+18.1
Labour	Diogo Rodrigues	662	27.3	+1.8
Liberal Democrats	Mike Senior	425	17.5	+11.7
Majority		675	27.8	+22.3
Turnout		2,424	28.3	+4.3
Registered electors		8,557		
Conservative hold		Swing		

=== Bridgwater North & Central ===
Bridgwater North & Central
Party	Candidate	Votes	%	±%
Labour	Dave Loveridge *	593	45.7	–18.2
Conservative	Pele Barnes	510	39.3	+16.7
Liberal Democrats	Antony Nickolls	196	15.1	+1.6
Majority		83	6.4	–35.0
Turnout		1,299	20.8	+4.8
Registered electors		6,905		
Labour hold		Swing		

=== Bridgwater South ===
Bridgwater South
Party	Candidate	Votes	%	±%
Labour	Leigh Redman *	954	51.0	–11.7
Conservative	Lance Duddridge	727	38.8	+1.5
Liberal Democrats	Daniel Alexander Kelly	191	10.2	N/A
Majority		227	12.1	–13.3
Turnout		1,872	24.0	+4.0
Registered electors		7,795		
Labour hold		Swing		

=== Bridgwater West ===
Bridgwater West
Party	Candidate	Votes	%	±%
Conservative	Ann Bown *	1,289	59.0	+20.4
Labour	Tony Heywood	606	27.8	+2.8
Liberal Democrats	Michelle Denise Phillips	288	13.2	+6.0
Majority		683	31.3	–21.9
Turnout		2,183	27.9	+3.9
Registered electors		7,837		
Conservative hold		Swing		

=== Brympton ===
Brympton
Party	Candidate	Votes	%	±%
Conservative	Josh Williams	1,021	47.3	+19.2
Liberal Democrats	Sam Crabb *	819	37.9	–1.4
Labour	Dan Marks	128	5.9	–1.9
UKIP	Anthony Power	126	5.8	–16.2
Green	Kek Long	66	3.1	N/A
Majority		202	9.3	N/A
Turnout		2,160	33.2	+3.2
Registered electors		6,501		
Conservative gain from Liberal Democrats		Swing		

=== Burnham on Sea North ===
Burnham on Sea North
Party	Candidate	Votes	%	±%
Conservative	Peter Burridge-Clayton *	1,485	47.5	–2.8
Liberal Democrats	Mike Murphy	1,183	37.9	+10.5
UKIP	Brian Royston Hobbs	278	8.9	N/A
Labour	Colin Michael Price	178	5.7	–7.0
Majority		302	9.7	–13.2
Turnout		3,124	38.7	+5.7
Registered electors		8,079		
Conservative hold		Swing		

=== Cannington ===
Cannington
Party	Candidate	Votes	%	±%
Conservative	Mike Caswell	1,737	63.6	+2.8
Liberal Democrats	Jill Dillamore	620	22.7	+2.6
Labour	Philip St Lawrence King	374	13.7	–5.4
Majority		1,117	40.9	+0.2
Turnout		2,731	37.1	+4.1
Registered electors		7,353		
Conservative hold		Swing		

=== Castle Cary ===
Castle Cary
Party	Candidate	Votes	%	±%
Conservative	Mike Lewis *	2,062	60.5	+16.8
Liberal Democrats	Henry Hobhouse	1,192	35.0	+0.8
Labour	Sean Adam Dromgoole	153	4.5	+0.4
Majority		870	25.5	+16.0
Turnout		3,407	44.9	–1.1
Registered electors		7,587		
Conservative hold		Swing		

=== Chard North ===
Chard North
Party	Candidate	Votes	%	±%
Liberal Democrats	Amanda Jane Broom	1,445	46.4	+21.1
Conservative	Martin John Wale	1,286	41.3	+11.5
UKIP	Nigel Charles Pearson *	252	8.1	–25.3
Labour	John Wardman Schofield	132	4.2	–3.3
Majority		159	5.1	N/A
Turnout		3,115	39.7	+2.7
Registered electors		7,846		
Liberal Democrats gain from UKIP		Swing		

=== Chard South ===
Chard South
Party	Candidate	Votes	%	±%
Conservative	Gemma Trudy Verdon	756	31.6	+8.8
Independent	Dave Bulmer	659	27.5	N/A
Liberal Democrats	Jason Paul Baker	603	25.2	–13.0
UKIP	Peter Martin Heather	217	9.1	–19.9
Labour	Melissa Louise Whittaker-Mather	161	6.7	+1.0
Majority		97	4.0	N/A
Turnout		2,396	36.6	+4.6
Registered electors		6,541		
Conservative gain from Liberal Democrats		Swing		

=== Cheddar ===
Cheddar
Party	Candidate	Votes	%	±%
Conservative	Nigel Philip Taylor	1,395	50.4	+11.2
Liberal Democrats	Tim Shaban	945	34.1	+15.1
Labour	Norma Scanion	250	9.0	–6.6
UKIP	Helen Dorothy Hims	178	6.4	–19.8
Majority		450	16.3	+3.2
Turnout		2,768	38.3	+6.3
Registered electors		7,225		
Conservative hold		Swing		

=== Coker ===
Coker
Party	Candidate	Votes	%	±%
Conservative	Mark Alexander Keating	1,885	52.2	+14.4
Liberal Democrats	Mick Clark	1,406	38.9	+7.6
Green	Peter Bysouth	184	5.1	+0.3
Labour	Jane Elizabeth Carter-Uren	135	3.7	–2.0
Majority		479	13.3	+6.8
Turnout		3,610	48.9	+3.9
Registered electors		7,473		
Conservative hold		Swing		

=== Comeytrowe & Trull ===
Comeytrowe & Trull
Party	Candidate	Votes	%	±%
Liberal Democrats	Alan Wedderkopp *	1,790	47.5	+7.6
Conservative	Andy Sully	1,496	39.7	+8.7
Labour	Liam David Canham	219	5.8	–0.7
Green	Cathy Parmenter	132	3.5	–0.2
UKIP	Bill Lukins	128	3.4	–16.3
Majority		294	7.8	–1.1
Turnout		3,765	47.8	+1.8
Registered electors		7,873		
Liberal Democrats hold		Swing		

=== Crewkerne ===
Crewkerne
Party	Candidate	Votes	%	±%
Liberal Democrats	Mike Best	1,364	43.9	–2.1
Conservative	Marcus Morton Barratt	1,294	41.7	+16.9
Labour	Gary David Swain	276	8.9	+4.2
UKIP	Arthur Sidney Hamlin	172	5.5	–14.2
Majority		70	2.3	–18.9
Turnout		3,106	44.1	+3.1
Registered electors		7,045		
Liberal Democrats hold		Swing		

=== Curry Rivel & Langport ===
Curry Rivel & Langport
Party	Candidate	Votes	%	±%
Conservative	Clare Aparicio Paul	1,801	47.2	+5.0
Independent	Andrew Lee	930	24.4	N/A
Liberal Democrats	Julia Mary Frances Gadd	623	16.3	–12.2
Labour	Stephen Peter Tilley	173	4.5	+1.1
Green	Stephen Peter Tate	157	4.1	–5.0
UKIP	Barbara Mary Jell	130	3.4	13.4
Majority		871	22.8	+9.1
Turnout		3,814	45.3	+1.3
Registered electors		8,416		
Conservative hold		Swing		

=== Dulverton & Exmoor ===
Dulverton & Exmoor
Party	Candidate	Votes	%	±%
Conservative	Frances Mary Nicholson *	2,234	75.4	+11.6
Liberal Democrats	Peter Charles Pilkington	394	13.2	N/A
Labour	Graham Robert Kennedy	191	6.4	–4.9
UKIP	Ivor Dennis Jones	146	5.0	–19.9
Majority		1,840	62.1	+23.2
Turnout		2,963	45.9	+6.9
Registered electors		6,450		
Conservative hold		Swing		

=== Dunster ===
Dunster
Party	Candidate	Votes	%	±%
Conservative	Christine Mary Lawrence *	1,470	53.1	+12.7
Liberal Democrats	James Damian Tudor Wall	732	26.4	+17.5
Labour	Lesley Culverhouse	300	10.8	–3.4
UKIP	Adrian Behan	147	5.3	–23.1
Green	Paul Donald Dennett	120	4.3	–3.8
Majority		738	26.7	+14.7
Turnout		2,769	40.9	+4.9
Registered electors		6,763		
Conservative hold		Swing		

=== Frome East ===
Frome East
Party	Candidate	Votes	%	±%
Green	Martin John Dimery	983	33.8	N/A
Conservative	Eve Berry	979	33.6	+8.8
Liberal Democrats	Alvin John Horsfall *	678	23.3	–12.3
Labour	David Alan Oakensen	271	9.3	–7.1
Majority		4	0.1	N/A
Turnout		2,911	34.0	+7.0
Registered electors		8,554		
Green gain from Liberal Democrats		Swing		

=== Frome North ===
Frome North
Party	Candidate	Votes	%	±%
Conservative	Linda Oliver *	1,551	51.5	+15.8
Liberal Democrats	Adam Owen Matthew Boyden	1,085	36.0	–1.3
Green	Pepita Collins	375	12.5	N/A
Majority		466	15.5	N/A
Turnout		3,011	42.0	+3.0
Registered electors		7,175		
Conservative gain from Liberal Democrats		Swing		

=== Frome West ===
Frome West
Party	Candidate	Votes	%	±%
Green	John Clarke	987	35.4	N/A
Conservative	Jo Beale	801	28.7	+9.3
Liberal Democrats	Damon John Hooton	680	24.4	–17.8
Labour	Theresa Mary Philomena Clark	243	8.7	–10.0
Liberal	Derek *	76	2.7	N/A
Majority		186	6.7	N/A
Turnout		2,787	34.6	+5.6
Registered electors		8,064		
Green gain from Liberal Democrats		Swing		

Derek (full name Derek Tanswell) was elected as a Liberal Democrat in 2013

=== Glastonbury & Street (2) ===
Glastonbury & Street (2 seats)
Party	Candidate	Votes	%	±%
Conservative	Terry Napper *	2,573	43.8	
Liberal Democrats	Liz Leyshon	2,272	38.7	
Liberal Democrats	Nick Cottle	2,037	34.7	
Conservative	David Albert George Swain	1,650	28.1	
Green	Jon Cousins	1,196	20.4	
Labour	Emma Jane King	697	11.9	
Labour	Jane Ratcliffe	530	9.0	
Independent	Simon Michael Carswell	433	7.4	N/A
UKIP	Keith Anthony Hooper	358	6.1	
Turnout		5,873	37.1	
Registered electors		15,813		
Conservative hold		Swing		
Liberal Democrats hold		Swing		

=== Highbridge & Burnham South ===
Highbridge & Burnham South
Party	Candidate	Votes	%	±%
Conservative	John Charles Woodman *	1,065	47.5	+10.4
Liberal Democrats	John David Parkes	767	34.2	+4.7
Labour	Lucy Scanlon	213	9.5	–7.3
UKIP	Lorna Irene Bromley Corke	197	8.8	N/A
Majority		298	13.3	+5.8
Turnout		2,242	29.7	+2.7
Registered electors		7,557		
Conservative hold		Swing		

=== Huntspill ===
Huntspill
Party	Candidate	Votes	%	±%
Conservative	Mark Healey *	1,810	68.0	+24.5
Liberal Democrats	Phil Harvey	513	19.3	+8.6
Labour	Chelsea Joan Chadwick	337	12.7	–0.2
Majority		1,297	48.8	+38.1
Turnout		2,660	35.6	+0.6
Registered electors		7,465		
Conservative hold		Swing		

=== Ilminster ===
Ilminster
Party	Candidate	Votes	%	±%
Conservative	Linda Patricia Vijeh *	1,736	53.4	+24.3
Liberal Democrats	Carol Ann Goodall	980	30.2	+4.5
Green	Peter Lansdown	203	6.3	–2.2
UKIP	Don Kinder	169	5.2	–23.6
Labour	Ian Rupert Mackillop	160	4.9	–1.6
Majority		756	23.3	+23.0
Turnout		3,248	39.6	–0.4
Registered electors		8,192		
Conservative hold		Swing		

=== King Alfred ===
King Alfred
Party	Candidate	Votes	%	±%
Conservative	David John Huxtable *	1,744	52.3	+6.2
Liberal Democrats	Emma Munt	1,146	34.4	+20.1
UKIP	Anthony John Edward Betty	232	7.0	–11.9
Labour	Lynne Morgan	210	6.3	–0.8
Majority		598	17.9	–9.3
Turnout		3,332	42.0	+6.0
Registered electors		7,924		
Conservative hold		Swing		

=== Lydeard ===
Lydeard
Party	Candidate	Votes	%	±%
Independent	Mike Rigby *	1,356	48.1	–5.8
Conservative	Roger Keith Habgood	1,055	37.4	+5.5
Liberal Democrats	James Russell	204	7.2	–2.7
Labour	Jonathan Frederic Gray	115	4.1	–0.1
Green	Clive Patrick Martin	88	3.1	N/A
Majority		301	10.7	–11.3
Turnout		2,818	38.1	–1.9
Registered electors		7,389		
Independent hold		Swing		

=== Martock ===
Martock
Party	Candidate	Votes	%	±%
Conservative	Neil Brian Bloomfield	2,075	63.5	+29.7
Liberal Democrats	Jonathan Paul Davies	923	28.3	–6.1
Labour	Peter Charles Ludbrook	268	8.2	+0.1
Majority		1,152	35.3	N/A
Turnout		3,266	39.0	+3.0
Registered electors		8,383		
Conservative gain from Liberal Democrats		Swing		

=== Mendip Central & East ===
Mendip Central & East
Party	Candidate	Votes	%	±%
Conservative	Philip John Ham *	1,730	60.0	+19.8
Liberal Democrats	Claire Louise Hudson	579	20.1	–12.4
Green	Jono Ekin	322	11.2	+6.1
Labour	Marc James Peel	251	8.7	+1.9
Majority		1,151	39.9	+32.1
Turnout		2,882	39.2	–0.8
Registered electors		7,356		
Conservative hold		Swing		

=== Mendip Hills ===
Mendip Hills
Party	Candidate	Votes	%	±%
Conservative	Mike Pullin	1,626	57.8	+14.8
Liberal Democrats	Melissa Coate	683	24.3	+12.4
Green	David Hine	197	7.0	–1.6
Labour	G. Paul Turner	191	6.8	–4.2
UKIP	Simon Smedley	115	4.1	–21.4
Majority		943	33.5	+15.9
Turnout		2,812	37.4	+4.4
Registered electors		7,511		
Conservative hold		Swing		

=== Mendip South ===
Mendip South
Party	Candidate	Votes	%	±%
Conservative	Nigel Anthony Hewitt-Coope	1,801	56.5	+17.3
Liberal Democrats	Robert John Reed	1,044	32.8	+0.8
Green	Theo Simon	340	10.7	+4.5
Majority		757	23.8	+16.6
Turnout		3,185	43.1	+2.1
Registered electors		7,392		
Conservative hold		Swing		

=== Mendip West ===
Mendip West
Party	Candidate	Votes	%	±%
Conservative	Graham Noel *	1,666	47.8	+10.0
Liberal Democrats	Ros Wyke	1,660	47.6	+13.3
Labour	Daniel Croose	159	4.6	–0.4
Majority		6	0.2	–3.3
Turnout		3,485	47.2	+5.2
Registered electors		7,389		
Conservative hold		Swing		

=== Minehead ===
Minehead
Party	Candidate	Votes	%	±%
Conservative	Mandy Jayne Chilcott	1,290	43.3	+21.0
Liberal Democrats	Marcus Kravis	839	28.1	+4.5
UKIP	Terry Venner *	609	20.4	–7.6
Labour	Maureen Anne Smith	243	8.2	+3.2
Majority		451	15.1	N/A
Turnout		2,981	44.3	+5.3
Registered electors		6,735		
Conservative gain from UKIP		Swing		

=== Monkton & North Curry ===
Monkton & North Curry
Party	Candidate	Votes	%	±%
Conservative	David John Andrew Fothergill *	2,254	66.5	+19.8
Liberal Democrats	Ray Tully	836	24.7	–1.8
Green	Andy Pritchard	297	8.8	+5.7
Majority		1,418	41.9	+21.7
Turnout		3,387	41.2	–0.8
Registered electors		8,213		
Conservative hold		Swing		

=== North Petherton ===
North Petherton
Party	Candidate	Votes	%	±%
Liberal Democrats	Bill Revans	1,435	51.3	+18.3
Conservative	Richard James Brown *	1,187	42.4	+8.4
Labour	Jane Grenfell	178	6.4	–4.1
Majority		248	8.9	N/A
Turnout		2,800	40.5	+8.5
Liberal Democrats gain from Conservative		Swing		

=== Rowbarton & Staplegrove ===
Rowbarton & Staplegrove
Party	Candidate	Votes	%	±%
Conservative	Rod Williams	1,125	40.1	+12.4
Liberal Democrats	Jefferson Andrew Horsley	1,018	36.3	+4.3
Independent	Bob Bainbridge	290	10.3	N/A
Labour	Brenda Dawn Weston	250	8.9	–5.4
Green	Alan William Debenham	119	4.2	–1.5
Majority		107	3.8	N/A
Turnout		2,802	38.8	+6.8
Registered electors		7,227		
Conservative gain from Liberal Democrats		Swing		

=== Shepton Mallet ===
Shepton Mallet
Party	Candidate	Votes	%	±%
Conservative	John Parham *	1,253	43.5	+13.2
Liberal Democrats	Garfield Kennedy	851	29.6	+3.4
Independent	Bente Height	403	14.0	N/A
Labour	Ant Butler	302	10.5	–10.5
Green	Peter Nicholas Harlow	69	2.4	–1.1
Majority		402	14.0	+10.0
Turnout		2,878	35.0	+4.0
Registered electors		8,214		
Conservative hold		Swing		

=== Somerton ===
Somerton
Party	Candidate	Votes	%	±%
Conservative	Dean Ruddle *	2,340	66.7	+22.7
Liberal Democrats	Stephen Richard John Page	869	24.8	+0.9
Green	Dan Britton	177	5.0	–7.5
Labour	Mary Graham Butler	124	3.5	–0.5
Majority		1,471	41.9	+21.8
Turnout		3,510	47.1	+3.1
Registered electors		7,451		
Conservative hold		Swing		

=== South Petherton & Islemoor ===
South Petherton & Islemoor
Party	Candidate	Votes	%	±%
Liberal Democrats	Adam James Dance	2,303	56.1	+24.0
Conservative	Christopher Antony Le Hardy *	1,455	35.4	+1.6
UKIP	Antony Bryan Clarke	187	4.6	–16.8
Labour	Paul John Sellers	162	3.9	–1.5
Majority		848	20.6	N/A
Turnout		4,107	50.7	+10.7
Registered electors		8,098		
Liberal Democrats gain from Conservative		Swing		

=== Taunton East ===
Taunton East
Party	Candidate	Votes	%	±%
Liberal Democrats	Simon Coles *	869	43.2	+5.2
Conservative	Stephen Henry Martin-Scott	661	32.8	+16.7
Labour	Robert Noakes	242	12.0	–2.6
UKIP	Hugh Courage	142	7.1	–18.3
Green	Jon Machen	99	4.9	–0.5
Majority		208	10.3	–2.3
Turnout		2,013	27.9	+1.9
Registered electors		7,223		
Liberal Democrats hold		Swing		

=== Taunton North ===
Taunton North
Party	Candidate	Votes	%	±%
Conservative	Giuseppe Leslie Fraschini	693	32.5	+15.1
Liberal Democrats	Chris Booth	648	30.4	+0.3
Labour	Libby Lisgo	543	25.4	+3.3
UKIP	Tom Aldridge	165	7.7	–16.2
Green	Daniel James Whelan	86	4.0	–1.9
Majority		45	2.1	N/A
Turnout		2,135	30.4	+4.4
Registered electors		7,023		
Conservative gain from Liberal Democrats		Swing		

=== Taunton South ===
Taunton South
Party	Candidate	Votes	%	±%
Liberal Democrats	Hazel Prior-Sankey *	1,564	54.9	+11.0
Conservative	Luke Rush Parchment	922	32.4	+15.1
Labour	Jack Robert Johnston	217	7.6	–3.6
Green	Chris Salter	144	5.1	+0.5
Majority		642	22.6	+1.8
Turnout		2,847	36.9	+2.9
Registered electors		7,707		
Liberal Democrats hold		Swing		

=== Upper Tone ===
Upper Tone
Party	Candidate	Votes	%	±%
Conservative	James Hunt *	1,574	49.1	+16.0
Independent	Steve Ross	890	27.8	+1.7
Liberal Democrats	Janet Carol Lloyd	485	15.1	+8.1
Green	Caroline Anne Freedman	256	8.0	N/A
Majority		684	21.3	+17.8
Turnout		3,205	43.8	+0.8
Registered electors		7,318		
Conservative hold		Swing		

=== Watchet & Stogursey ===
Watchet & Stogursey
Party	Candidate	Votes	%	±%
Independent	Hugh Davies *	1,423	48.7	+9.6
Conservative	Richard Patrick Lillis	900	30.8	+1.3
Labour	Robin Keith Nuttall	298	10.2	–1.3
Liberal Democrats	Anthony Charles Bowden	191	6.5	N/A
UKIP	Peter Barbuti	108	3.7	–16.3
Majority		523	17.9	+8.3
Turnout		2,920	39.4	+3.4
Independent hold		Swing		

=== Wellington ===
Wellington
Party	Candidate	Votes	%	±%
Labour	Andrew Govier *	1,704	52.5	+1.6
Conservative	Robin Dickinson	1,151	35.5	+15.4
Liberal Democrats	Mark Raymond Lithgow	272	8.4	–2.1
Green	Zoe Ainsworth-Grigg	119	3.7	+0.8
Majority		553	17.0	–13.7
Turnout		3,246	37.4	+1.4
Registered electors		8,673		
Labour hold		Swing		

=== Wells ===
Wells
Party	Candidate	Votes	%	±%
Liberal Democrats	Tessa Jane Munt	2,107	46.9	+21.0
Conservative	John Derek Osman *	2,012	44.7	+4.0
Labour	Den Carter	166	3.7	–8.8
Green	Paul Francis Crummay	126	2.8	–3.4
UKIP	Les Bate	86	1.9	–12.9
Majority		95	2.1	N/A
Turnout		4,497	52.6	+11.6
Registered electors		8,556		
Liberal Democrats gain from Conservative		Swing		

=== Wincanton & Bruton ===
Wincanton & Bruton
Party	Candidate	Votes	%	±%
Conservative	Anna Groskop *	2,096	64.2	+11.0
Liberal Democrats	Abigail Rebekah Baker	708	21.7	+2.9
Labour	Patricia Ann Turner	244	7.5	+0.9
Green	Ewan William George Jones	216	6.6	+2.1
Majority		1,388	42.5	+8.1
Turnout		3,264	39.1	+4.1
Registered electors		8,352		
Conservative hold		Swing		

=== Yeovil Central ===
Yeovil Central
Party	Candidate	Votes	%	±%
Liberal Democrats	Andy Kendall	1,033	44.7	+10.3
Conservative	Nick Rousell	745	32.2	+10.4
UKIP	Alan Ivor Dimmick *	226	9.8	–24.3
Labour	Terry Lavin	215	9.3	–1.4
Green	Alan Flint	93	4.0	N/A
Majority		288	12.5	N/A
Turnout		2,312	32.0	+3.0
Registered electors		7,231		
Liberal Democrats gain from UKIP		Swing		

=== Yeovil East ===
Yeovil East
Party	Candidate	Votes	%	±%
Liberal Democrats	Tony Lock *	1,063	49.0	+7.9
Conservative	Teresa Sienkiewicz	512	23.6	+14.2
Labour	Terry Ledlie	255	11.8	+1.6
UKIP	Godfrey Davey	220	10.1	–25.7
Independent	Neil James Mitchell	118	5.4	N/A
Majority		551	25.4	+20.0
Turnout		2,168	28.4	+1.4
Registered electors		7,633		
Liberal Democrats hold		Swing		

=== Yeovil South ===
Yeovil South
Party	Candidate	Votes	%	±%
Conservative	Faye Purbrick	1,288	46.2	+21.6
Liberal Democrats	Andy Soughton	1,031	37.0	–1.6
Labour	Christos Zaranis	173	6.2	–2.8
Independent	Dave Greene	165	5.9	N/A
Green	Diane Catherine Wood	131	4.7	+0.3
Majority		257	9.2	N/A
Turnout		2,788	36.4	+3.4
Registered electors		7,655		
Conservative gain from Liberal Democrats		Swing		

=== Yeovil West ===
Yeovil West
Party	Candidate	Votes	%	±%
Liberal Democrats	Jane Lock *	877	43.1	+2.9
Conservative	John Richard Lukey	783	38.5	+18.6
Labour	Gail Freeman-Bell	234	11.5	+1.7
Green	Robert Charles Wood	140	6.9	+2.0
Majority		94	4.6	–10.5
Turnout		2,034	32.2	+3.2
Registered electors		6,316		
Liberal Democrats hold		Swing		

== By-elections ==
=== Comeytrowe & Trull ===
Comeytrowe & Trull: 7 October 2021
Party	Candidate	Votes	%	±%
Liberal Democrats	Dawn Johnson	1,677	63.2	+15.6
Conservative	Ruth Harmon	886	33.4	−6.4
Labour	Michael McGuffie	92	3.5	−2.4
Majority		791	29.8	
Turnout		2,655		
Liberal Democrats hold		Swing	▲11.0	
