= 2019 North East Derbyshire District Council election =

2019 UK local government election

← 2015	2 May 2019	2023 →

All 53 seats to North East Derbyshire District Council 27 seats needed for a majority

	First party	Second party
Party	Conservative	Labour
Last election	18 seats, 43.8%	32 seats, 50.4%
Seats won	30	18
Seat change	▲12	▼16
Popular vote	26,178	19,820
Percentage	46.7%	35.4%
Swing	▲2.9%	▼15.0%
	Third party	Fourth party
Party	Liberal Democrats	Independent
Last election	N/A	1 seat, 2.1%
Seats won	3	2
Seat change	▲3	▲1
Popular vote	7,609	1,361
Percentage	13.6%	2.4%
Swing	N/A	▲0.3%
- Map of the results
Council control before election
Labour
Council control after election
Conservative

The 2019 North East Derbyshire District Council election took place on 2 May 2019 to elect members of North East Derbyshire District Council in England. This was on the same day as other local elections. The whole council was up for election on new boundaries. The Conservatives gained control of the council from the Labour Party for the first time ever.

== Summary ==
=== Election result ===
2019 North East Derbyshire District Council election
Party	Candidates	Seats	Gains	Losses	Net gain/loss	Seats %	Votes %	Votes	+/−
Conservative	53	30	N/A	N/A	▲12	56.6	46.7	26,178	+2.9
Labour	52	18	N/A	N/A	▼16	34.0	35.4	19,820	–15.0
Liberal Democrats	39	3	N/A	N/A	▲3	5.7	13.6	7,609	N/A
Independent	3	2	N/A	N/A	▲1	3.8	2.4	1,361	+0.3
Green	4	0	N/A	N/A	Steady	0.0	1.9	1,078	N/A

== Ward results ==
=== Ashover ===
Ashover
Party	Candidate	Votes	%	±%
Conservative	James William Armitage* (William Armitage)	515	76.6	
Liberal Democrats	Lee Clarke	101	15.0	
Labour	John Gorman	56	8.3	
Majority		414	61.6	
Turnout		674	42.44	
Conservative win (new seat)				

=== Barlow and Holmesfield ===
Barlow and Holmesfield
Party	Candidate	Votes	%	±%
Conservative	Carol Huckerby*	370	65.3	
Labour	Michael Alcock	122	21.5	
Liberal Democrats	John Wilcock	75	13.3	
Majority		248	43.8	
Turnout		589	37.47	
Conservative win (new seat)				

=== Brampton and Walton ===
Brampton and Walton
Party	Candidate	Votes	%	±%
Conservative	Martin Thacker*	895	71.3	
Conservative	Peter Elliott*	853	68.0	
Labour	Margaret Gorman	248	19.8	
Liberal Democrats	Pauline Marriott	169	13.5	
Labour	Nicola Morley	148	11.8	
Majority		605	48.2	
Turnout		1,266	45.51	
Conservative win (new seat)				
Conservative win (new seat)				

=== Clay Cross North ===
Clay Cross North
Party	Candidate	Votes	%	±%
Labour	Geoffrey Morley*	627	49.7	
Labour	Tracy Reader*	590	46.8	
Labour	Kathleen Rouse*	549	43.5	
Conservative	Derek Ball	362	28.7	
Conservative	Andrew Lovell	353	28.0	
Conservative	George Ramshaw	315	25.0	
Liberal Democrats	John Ahern	202	16.0	
Liberal Democrats	Claire Lander-Shafik	186	14.8	
Liberal Democrats	Leah Lander-Shafik	165	13.1	
Majority		187	14.8	
Turnout		1,309	27.26	
Labour win (new seat)				
Labour win (new seat)				
Labour win (new seat)				

=== Clay Cross South ===
Clay Cross South
Party	Candidate	Votes	%	±%
Labour	Brian Wright*	417	60.5	
Labour	Margaret Jones	395	57.3	
Conservative	Fiona Turner	124	18.0	
Green	Yvonne Rowse	119	17.3	
Conservative	Gareth Hopkinson	116	16.8	
Liberal Democrats	Steven Kerry	74	10.7	
Majority		271	39.3	
Turnout		711	25.46	
Labour win (new seat)				
Labour win (new seat)				

=== Coal Aston ===
Coal Aston
Party	Candidate	Votes	%	±%
Conservative	Anthony Hutchinson	810	66.9	
Conservative	Mark Foster*	699	57.8	
Labour	Rachel Steele	280	23.1	
Labour	David Cheetham	255	21.1	
Liberal Democrats	David Goater	139	11.5	
Liberal Democrats	Regina Kay	87	7.2	
Majority		419	44.7	
Turnout		1,237	41.06	
Conservative win (new seat)				
Conservative win (new seat)				

=== Dronfield North ===
Dronfield North
Party	Candidate	Votes	%	±%
Conservative	Paul Parkin	431	48.4	
Conservative	Philip Wright	413	46.4	
Labour	Graham Baxter*	348	39.1	
Labour	Christine Smith*	340	38.2	
Liberal Democrats	Stephen Hutchinson	105	11.8	
Liberal Democrats	Adrienne Wilcock	102	11.4	
Majority		65	7.3	
Turnout		914	32.32	
Conservative win (new seat)				
Conservative win (new seat)				

=== Dronfield South ===
Dronfield South
Party	Candidate	Votes	%	±%
Conservative	Angelique Foster-Guembourg*	1,108	60.1	
Conservative	Alan Powell*	947	51.4	
Conservative	Kevin Tait*	932	50.5	
Labour	Timothy Searle	369	20.0	
Labour	Caroline Smith	359	19.5	
Labour	Kathryn Steele	316	17.1	
Green	Neil Jackson	304	16.5	
Liberal Democrats	Wendy Temple	284	15.4	
Liberal Democrats	Simon Temple	273	14.8	
Liberal Democrats	Samuel MacLeod	230	12.5	
Majority		563	30.5	
Turnout		1,866	38.45	
Conservative win (new seat)				
Conservative win (new seat)				
Conservative win (new seat)				

=== Dronfield Woodhouse ===
Dronfield Woodhouse
Party	Candidate	Votes	%	±%
Conservative	Roger Hall*	383	64.8	
Labour	Roland Lovatt	114	19.3	
Liberal Democrats	Rachel MacLeod	94	15.9	
Majority		269	45.5	
Turnout		596	39.65	
Conservative win (new seat)				

=== Eckington North ===
Eckington North
Party	Candidate	Votes	%	±%
Conservative	Jeremy Kenyon	451	47.6	
Conservative	Oscar Gomez Reaney	447	47.2	
Labour	Catherine Tite*	318	33.6	
Labour	Kane Deffley	288	30.4	
Independent	Brian Wood	173	18.3	
Liberal Democrats	Mark Vongyer	63	6.7	
Majority		129	13.6	
Turnout		961	31.41	
Conservative win (new seat)				
Conservative win (new seat)				

=== Eckington South and Renishaw ===
Eckington South and Renishaw
Party	Candidate	Votes	%	±%
Labour	Clive Hunt*	524	48.6	
Labour	Stephen Pickering	437	40.5	
Labour	Jacqueline Ridgway*	429	39.8	
Conservative	Philip Wheelhouse	385	35.7	
Conservative	Beverley Kenyon	339	31.4	
Conservative	Elizabeth Blanshard*	299	27.7	
Green	David Kesteven	242	22.4	
Liberal Democrats	Julia Affleck	122	11.3	
Majority		44	4.1	
Turnout		1,106	23.91	
Labour win (new seat)				
Labour win (new seat)				
Labour win (new seat)				

=== Gosforth Valley ===
Gosforth Valley
Party	Candidate	Votes	%	±%
Conservative	Michelle Emmens*	1,166	60.4	
Conservative	Lilian Deighton	1,144	59.2	
Conservative	Richard Welton*	1,109	57.4	
Labour	Sandra Green	413	21.5	
Labour	John Whiteley	411	21.3	
Labour	John Laxton	399	20.7	
Liberal Democrats	Philip Kay	340	17.6	
Liberal Democrats	Samuel Kay	318	16.5	
Liberal Democrats	Camille Ramshaw	275	14.2	
Majority		696	35.9	
Turnout		1,966	41.64	
Conservative win (new seat)				
Conservative win (new seat)				
Conservative win (new seat)				

=== Grassmoor ===
Grassmoor
Party	Candidate	Votes	%	±%
Labour	Elizabeth Hill* (Betty Hill)	454	61.6	
Labour	Lee Hartshorne	437	59.3	
Liberal Democrats	Blaine Uknighted	121	16.4	
Liberal Democrats	Sandra Hindes	119	16.1	
Conservative	Robert Gilmore	111	15.1	
Conservative	Derrick Willmot	108	14.7	
Majority		316	42.9	
Turnout		770	26.91	
Labour win (new seat)				
Labour win (new seat)				

=== Holmewood and Heath ===
Holmewood and Heath
Party	Candidate	Votes	%	±%
Labour	Suzy Cornwell Ball	370	57.1	
Labour	Lee Stone*	330	50.9	
Conservative	Amy Dale	187	28.9	
Conservative	Judith Ramshaw	178	27.5	
Liberal Democrats	David Marriott	96	14.8	
Majority		143	22.0	
Turnout		683	22.79	
Labour win (new seat)				
Labour win (new seat)				

=== Killamarsh East ===
Killamarsh East
Party	Candidate	Votes	%	±%
Conservative	Kevin Bone	395	51.6	
Conservative	Nicholas Whitehead	354	46.2	
Labour	John Windle*	353	46.1	
Labour	Harold Laws*	348	45.4	
Majority		1	0.1	
Turnout		795	26.87	
Conservative win (new seat)				
Conservative win (new seat)				

=== Killamarsh West ===
Killamarsh West
Party	Candidate	Votes	%	±%
Conservative	Patricia Bone	559	52.2	
Conservative	Stephen Clough	523	48.9	
Conservative	Maureen Potts	521	48.7	
Labour	Lilian Robinson*	476	44.5	
Labour	Alan Garrett*	466	43.6	
Labour	William Rice*	464	43.4	
Majority		45	4.2	
Turnout		1,112	25.94	
Conservative win (new seat)				
Conservative win (new seat)				
Conservative win (new seat)				

=== North Wingfield Central ===
North Wingfield Central
Party	Candidate	Votes	%	±%
Labour	Nigel Barker*	723	61.4	
Labour	Jayne Barry*	641	54.4	
Labour	Jeffrey Lilley*	608	51.6	
Conservative	Ann Passeri	279	23.7	
Liberal Democrats	Paul Williamson	222	18.8	
Conservative	Harry Smith	215	18.3	
Conservative	Felicity Turner	195	16.6	
Liberal Democrats	Nadine Dart	173	14.7	
Liberal Democrats	Coral Pollendine	136	11.5	
Majority		329	27.9	
Turnout		1,209	26.48	
Labour win (new seat)				
Labour win (new seat)				
Labour win (new seat)				

=== Pilsley and Morton ===
Pilsley and Morton
Party	Candidate	Votes	%	±%
Independent	Andrew Cooper*	692	51.0	
Labour	Patricia Holmes*	504	37.1	
Independent	John Funnell	496	36.6	
Labour	Geoffrey Butler*	460	33.9	
Conservative	Emily Cupit	243	17.9	
Conservative	Katherine Burrow	189	13.9	
Liberal Democrats	Benjamin Marshall	173	12.7	
Conservative	William Watton	162	11.9	
Liberal Democrats	Gordon Marshall	111	8.2	
Majority		36	2.7	
Turnout		1,374	32.17	
Independent win (new seat)				
Labour win (new seat)				
Independent win (new seat)				

=== Ridgeway and Marsh Lane ===
Ridgeway and Marsh Lane
Party	Candidate	Votes	%	±%
Conservative	Carolyn Renwick	361	60.0	
Labour	Cassandra Steel	186	30.9	
Liberal Democrats	Alan Marshall	55	9.1	
Majority		175	29.1	
Turnout		615	43.07	
Conservative win (new seat)				

=== Shirland ===
Shirland
Party	Candidate	Votes	%	±%
Conservative	Charlotte Cupit*	792	56.1	
Conservative	Heather Liggett	631	44.7	
Conservative	Michael Roe	607	43.0	
Labour	Derrick Skinner*	505	35.8	
Labour	Barry Barnes*	485	34.4	
Labour	Allistair Lomax	422	29.9	
Liberal Democrats	Peter Wood	148	10.5	
Liberal Democrats	Wendy Smalley	107	7.6	
Majority		102	7.2	
Turnout		1,441	31.24	
Conservative win (new seat)				
Conservative win (new seat)				
Conservative win (new seat)				

=== Sutton ===
Sutton
Party	Candidate	Votes	%	±%
Labour	Joseph Birkin	402	49.7	
Labour	Patrick Kerry*	402	49.7	
Conservative	Irene Evans	277	34.2	
Conservative	Jack Woolley	262	32.4	
Liberal Democrats	Christine Radford	110	13.6	
Majority		125	15.5	
Turnout		836	25.72	
Labour win (new seat)				
Labour win (new seat)				

=== Tupton ===
Tupton
Party	Candidate	Votes	%	±%
Liberal Democrats	David Hancock*	621	45.9	
Liberal Democrats	Pamela Windley	531	39.2	
Liberal Democrats	Ross Shipman	530	39.1	
Labour	Catherine Goodyer	388	28.9	
Labour	Stephen Peters*	384	28.4	
Conservative	Jessica Andrews	381	28.1	
Conservative	Neil Baker	357	26.4	
Labour	Ross Griffin	343	25.3	
Conservative	Demiray Oral	309	22.8	
Majority		142	10.2	
Turnout		1,368	35.45	
Liberal Democrats win (new seat)				
Liberal Democrats win (new seat)				
Liberal Democrats win (new seat)				

=== Unstone ===
Unstone
Party	Candidate	Votes	%	±%
Conservative	Alexander Dale*	319	63.0	
Labour	Janet Hill	156	30.8	
Liberal Democrats	Matthew Walker	31	6.1	
Majority		163	32.2	
Turnout		518	36.35	
Conservative win (new seat)				

=== Wingerworth ===
Wingerworth
Party	Candidate	Votes	%	±%
Conservative	Patricia Antcliff*	1,006	56.3	
Conservative	Diana Ruff	906	50.7	
Conservative	Barry Lewis*	885	49.5	
Green	Frank Adlington-Stringer	413	23.1	
Liberal Democrats	Robert Rogerson	396	22.1	
Liberal Democrats	June Hancock	289	16.2	
Labour	Paul Addison	268	15.0	
Labour	Michael Gordon*	252	14.1	
Labour	Beyant Bath	241	13.5	
Liberal Democrats	Keith Windley	236	13.2	
Majority		472	26.4	
Turnout		1,822	43.20	
Conservative win (new seat)				
Conservative win (new seat)				
Conservative win (new seat)				

== By-elections ==
=== Eckington South & Renishaw ===
Eckington South & Renishaw: 6 May 2021
Party	Candidate	Votes	%	±%
Conservative	Philip Wheelhouse	657		
Labour	Clive Hunt*	547		
Liberal Democrats	Alan Marshall	70		
Conservative gain from Labour				

The Eckington South and Renishaw by-election was triggered by the disqualification of Labour councillor Clive Hunt for non-attendance.

=== Killamarsh East ===
Killamarsh East: 6 May 2021
Party	Candidate	Votes	%	±%
Conservative	David Drabble	519		
Labour	John Windle	359		
Liberal Democrats	Morgan Leggett	42		
Conservative hold				

The Killamarsh East by-election in May 2021 was triggered by the resignation of Conservative councillor Kevin Bone.

=== Killamarsh West ===
Killamarsh West: 6 May 2021
Party	Candidate	Votes	%	±%
Conservative	Alex Platts	748		
Labour	Stuart Mullins	479		
Liberal Democrats	Mark Firth	111		
Conservative hold				

The Killamarsh West by-election was triggered by the resignation of Conservative councillor Patricia Bone.

=== Barlow & Holmesfield ===
Barlow & Holmesfield: 9 September 2021
Party	Candidate	Votes	%	±%
Conservative	Bentley Strafford-Stephenson	294	69.0	+3.8
Labour	Ross Griffin	90	21.1	−0.4
Liberal Democrats	John Wilcock	42	9.9	−3.4
Majority		204	47.9	
Turnout		427	26.5	
Conservative hold		Swing	▲2.1	

The Barlow and Holmesfield by-election was triggered by the resignation of Conservative councillor Carol Huckerby.

=== Killamarsh East ===
Killamarsh East: 9 September 2021
Party	Candidate	Votes	%	±%
Labour	Tony Lacey	291	49.9	+10.9
Conservative	Wendy Tinley	251	43.1	−13.4
Liberal Democrats	Mark Firth	41	7.0	+2.5
Majority		50	6.8	
Turnout		587	20.0	
Labour gain from Conservative		Swing	▲12.2	

The Killamarsh by-election in September 2021 was triggered by the resignation of Conservative councillor Nick Whitehead.

=== Pilsley & Morton ===
Pilsley & Morton: 28 July 2022
Party	Candidate	Votes	%	±%
Labour	Kevin Gillott	806	65.9	
Conservative	Dave Sankey	361	29.5	
Green	David Kesteven	34	2.8	
Liberal Democrats	Nadine Dart	22	1.8	
Majority		445	36.4	
Turnout		1223		
Labour hold		Swing		

The Pilsley and Morton by-election was triggered by the death of Labour councillor Patricia Holmes.
