= All Saints' Church, Ashover =

All Saints’ Church, Ashover
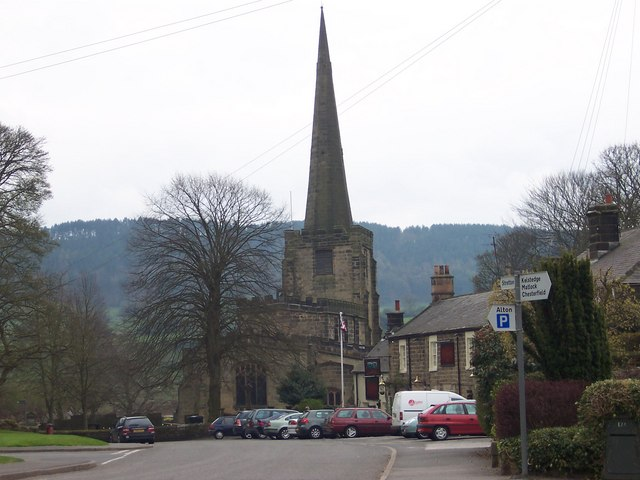
- All Saints’ Church, Ashover
- All Saints’ Church, Ashover
- 53°09′51.29″N 1°28′48.16″W
- OS grid reference: SK 34868 63124
- Location: Ashover
- Country: England
- Denomination: Church of England
- Website: Church website

History
- Dedication: All Saints

Architecture
- Heritage designation: Grade I listed

Specifications
- Height: 128 feet (39 m)

Administration
- Province: Province of Canterbury
- Diocese: Diocese of Derby
- Archdeaconry: Chesterfield
- Deanery: Chesterfield
- Parish: Ashover

All Saints’ Church, Ashover is a Grade I listed parish church in the Church of England in Ashover, Derbyshire.

== History ==
The porch of the church dates from 1275, the north aisle is mid-14th century. The remainder of the church dates from between 1350 and 1419, and was built by Thomas Babington.

A restoration was carried out in 1886 by Wans and Jolley of Nottingham. The western gallery was removed and the belfry and tower arch were opened out. The plaster was scraped from the pillars, arches and walls. The north door was also opened out.

Another restoration was undertaken in 1903 by Percy Heylyn Currey of Derby. The old seats were replaced we new oak pews carved by G and W Eastwood. The floor was re-laid with maple blocking and the heating system was overhauled. The stone paving in the aisles was relaid at the same height as the rest of the floor. The large reredos was moved from the east end and replaced with a smaller one. The church was reopened on 11 September 1903.

== Organ ==
The first organ was installed in 1886 by Abbott of Leeds for a cost of £250 (equivalent to £28,094 in 2025) but is no longer extant.

=== Organists ===
- George Henry Sadler ca.1888
- John Goddard Barker 1892–1895 (formerly organist at All Saints' Church, Matlock Bank, afterwards organist at St Oswald's Church, Fulford, North Yorkshire)
- Frederic J, Staten 1899–1909
- Bertram Hopkinson 1910–c. 1950

== Parish status ==
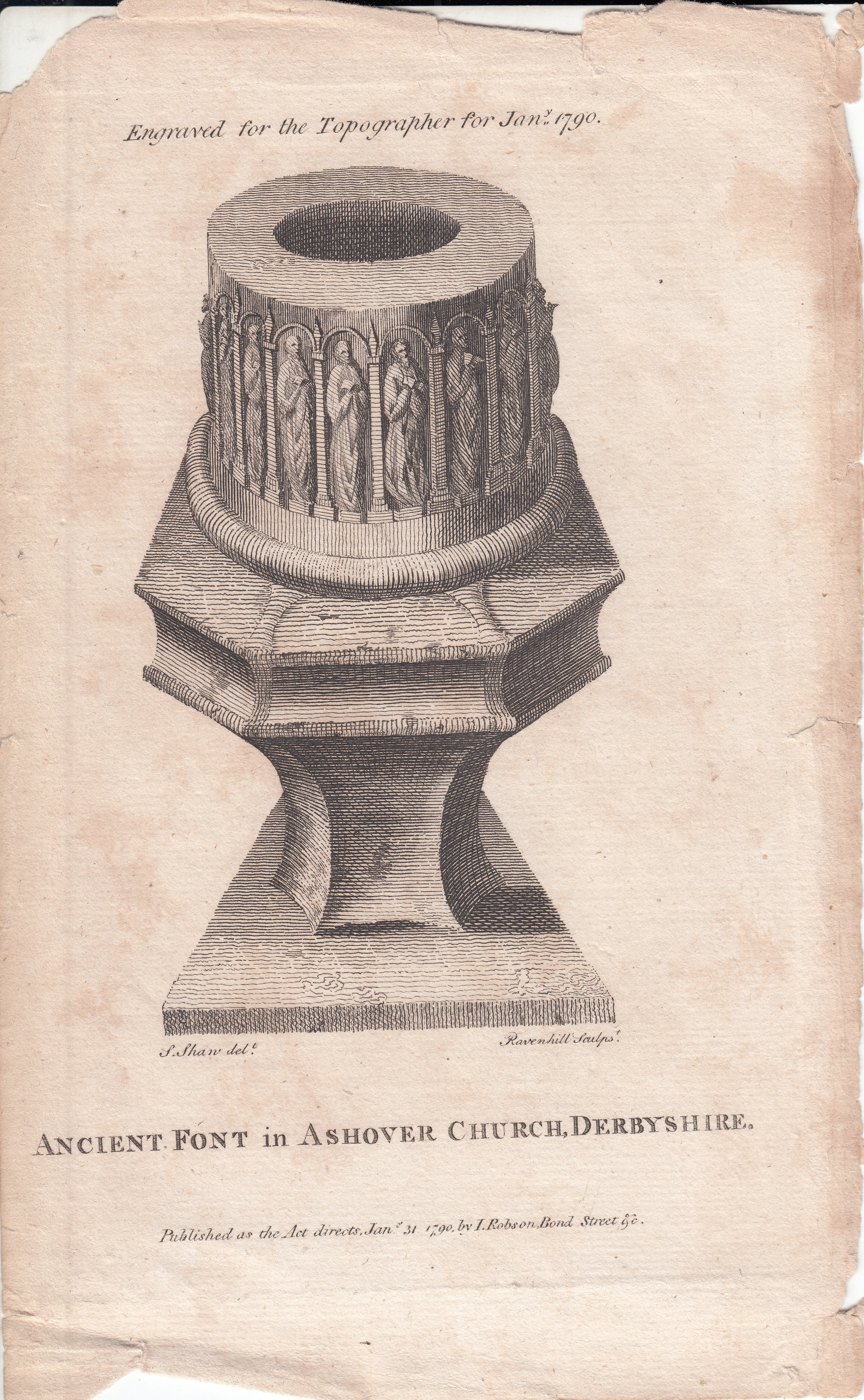
Ancient font, 1790

The church is in a joint parish with:

- Holy Trinity Church, Brackenfield
- Christ Church, Wessington

== See also ==
- Grade I listed churches in Derbyshire
- Listed buildings in Ashover
