= Listed buildings in Ashover =

Ashover is a civil parish in the North East Derbyshire district of Derbyshire, England. The parish contains 83 listed buildings that are recorded in the National Heritage List for England. Of these, one is listed at Grade I, the highest of the three grades, and the others are at Grade II, the lowest grade. The parish is almost entirely rural, and contains the village of Ashover and smaller settlements, including Milltown and Ashover Hay. Most of the listed buildings are farmhouses and farmbuildings, houses, cottages, and associated structures. The other listed buildings include a church and items in the churchyard, chapels, public houses, a footbridge and a road bridge, a former watermill and a windmill, a pinfold, the chimney of a former engine house, a former school, and a telephone kiosk.

== Key ==
Grade	Criteria
I	Buildings of exceptional interest, sometimes considered to be internationally important
II	Buildings of national importance and special interest

== Buildings ==
Name and location	Photograph	Date	Notes	Grade
All Saints' Church; 53.16410°N 1.47997°W		Early 15th century	The church, which contains some earlier features, is in sandstone with lead roofs. It consists of a nave with a clerestory, north and south aisles, a south porch, a chancel with a north vestry and organ chamber, and a west steeple. The steeple has a tower with three stages, angle buttresses, an ogee-headed west window, a round-arched doorway, a slit window, and a clock face on the south, two-light bell openings, gargoyles, an embattled parapet, and a recessed spire. Most of the parapets on the body of the church are embattled.	I
Eastwood Hall and Eastwood Hall Cottage; 53.16130°N 1.46560°W	—	16th century	The hall is a former manor house that is now in ruins, and the attached cottage dates probably from the late 18th century. The buildings are in sandstone, and the cottage has a tile roof. The hall is without a roof, and many of the walls are collapsed. Part of a tower wall of four or five storeys remains, and in some of the other walls are mullioned or mullioned and transomed windows. Projecting from the ruins is a two-storey wing, and the rest of the cottage consists of a lean-to with a conservatory.	II
Edlestow Hall Farmhouse; 53.16422°N 1.51096°W	—	16th century (or earlier)	The house is in gritstone, partly on a plinth, with quoins, and stone slate roofs with coped gables and moulded kneelers. There are two storeys and two ranges. The main range has a symmetrical front of five bays, and contains a central two-storey porch that has a doorway with a moulded surround and a four-centred arch, and the windows are casements. To the northeast is a single bay with a single-storey gabled porch. The southwest range is earlier, it has three bays, and the windows are mullioned.	II
Goss Hall; 53.16102°N 1.49650°W	—	Early 17th century	The house, which has been altered and extended, is in gritstone, with quoins and a roof of stone slate and tile with coped gables and ball finials. There are two storeys and attics, and a double-depth plan. The east front has three bays and a central doorway, with a two-storey canted bay window with tile hanging to the right. Most of the other windows are mullioned. To the left is a lower single-storey bay that has a doorway with a quoined surround and a massive lintel, now blocked and with an inserted window. The south front has two gables.	II
Hardwick Farmhouse (west); 53.17953°N 1.49651°W	—	Early 17th century	The farmhouse, which was later altered and extended, is in gritstone, and has a roof of Welsh slate and stone slate with coped gables. There are two storeys, three bays, and lower single-bay wings at each end. The central doorway, with a quoined surround, has been blocked, and a window inserted, and there is a later doorway converted from a window. The window above the doorway has a single light, the other windows are mullioned, and all have hood moulds. In the right wing, steps lead to an upper floor doorway.	II
Knotcross Farmhouse; 53.14051°N 1.46915°W	—	Early 17th century	The farmhouse is in gritstone, and has a tile roof with coped gables and moulded kneelers. There are two storeys and attics, and a T-shaped plan with a front range of three bays. The central doorway has a chamfered quoined surround and a hood mould. Above it is a single light window, in the west gable end is a single-light window with a moulded surround, and the other windows are mullioned, those in the front with hood moulds.	II
Cottage attached to Buntingfield; 53.18707°N 1.51933°W	—	1638	The cottage is the remaining part of a larger house, and is now a wing of a 19th-century house. It is in rendered gritstone, and has a tile roof with moulded gable copings. There are two storeys and an attic, and a T-shaped plan. The south front has two bays, the windows in the front are mullioned with hood moulds, and in the southeast gable end is a two-light attic window, a horizontally-sliding sash window, a datestone, and a raised parapet.	II
2 Butts Road; 53.16294°N 1.48041°W	—	17th century	The house, which was altered later, is in gritstone with quoins, and a tile roof with a copped gable and moulded kneelers at the east end. The doorway has a massive surround and lintel, and a bracketed canopy. To the right is an inserted garage door, and the windows are mullioned with two lights.	II
Amber House, outbuildings, wall and gateposts 53.16305°N 1.48003°W	—	17th century	The house, which was later remodelled, is in gritstone with plain eaves and a roof of Welsh slate and stone slate. There are three storeys, and an L-shaped plan, consisting of a three-bay range, and a single-bay rear wing. In the centre is a doorway with a rectangular fanlight and a massive lintel. This is flanked by canted bay windows, and the other windows are sashes. In front of the house is a boundary wall in gritstone, containing square gateposts with pyramidal caps.	II
Amber Lodge; 53.15600°N 1.48447°W	—	17th century	A house that was later extended, it is in sandstone with a slate roof. The older part is the cross-wing on the left that has two storeys and an attic, coping gables, mullioned windows, and a later porch. The main range dates probably from the 19th century, it has two storeys, four bays, and contains 20th-century windows.	II
Clattercotes Farmhouse; 53.13890°N 1.46644°W		17th century	The farmhouse, which has been altered and extended, is in gritstone with quoins and a slate roof. There are two storeys and five bays. There is a doorway with a quoined surround, another doorway with a quoined surround and a massive lintel has been converted into a window, and the other windows, formerly mullioned, contain casements.	II
Outbuilding, Greenfield Farm; 53.14552°N 1.47265°W	—	17th century (or earlier)	The outbuilding, which has been restored, is in gritstone with a Welsh slate roof. It consists of a single-storey range with an overloft at the north and three bays, and a two-storey single-bay wing at the north. It contains various openings, some blocked, and inside there are three cruck trusses.	II
Hardwick Farmhouse (east); 53.17943°N 1.49535°W	—	Mid-17th century	The farmhouse, which has been altered and extended, is in gritstone with quoins and a roof of stone slate and tile. There are two storeys and attics, and an L-shaped plan, consisting of a main range of three bays, and a cross-wing. The central doorway has a chamfered and quoined surround, and a massive initialled and dated lintel. Most of the windows are mullioned, and there is a continuous hood mould over the ground floor openings.	II
Haslehurst Farmhouse; 53.19395°N 1.48066°W	—	17th century	The farmhouse, which has been altered and extended, is in gritstone, and has a Welsh slate roof with coped gables and moulded kneelers. There are two storeys, three bays, and a single-storey outhouse attached at the southwest. In the centre is a gabled porch, and a doorway with massive jambs and lintel. Above the door is a gabled dormer, and most of the other windows are mullioned.	II
Outbuilding, Knuttingfields Farm; 53.16750°N 1.45673°W	—	17th century	Originally a house, the outbuilding is in gritstone, with quoins, and a corrugated sheet roof with coped gables and kneelers. Most of the openings have moulded surrounds, and some have mullions.	II
Miners Arms Public House; 53.15152°N 1.47096°W		17th century	The public house, which has been remodelled and extended, is in gritstone, with quoins and a tile roof. There are two storeys, an L-shaped plan, and a front range of three bays. The central doorway has a massive surround and lintel. Above the doorway is a single-light window, and the other windows on the front are mullioned with two lights.	II
Range of outbuildings, Overton Hall; 53.15637°N 1.48363°W	—	17th century	The outbuildings are in gritstone, and have a tile roof with coped gables and kneelers. There are two storeys, and an L-shaped plan, consisting of a range with six bays, and a two-bay wing at the southwest. In the main range is a doorway with depressed segmental-arched head and a quoined surround, and there is another doorway with massive jambs and a lintel. Other openings include mullioned windows and slit and cruciform vents, and a double flight of steps leads to an upper floor doorway.	II
House south of The Cottage; 53.16325°N 1.48033°W	—	17th century	The house, which has been altered, is in gritstone with quoins and a Welsh slate roof. There are two storeys and two bays. The central doorway has massive jambs and a deep lintel. It is flanked by sash windows, and in the upper floor the windows are mullioned with two lights.	II
The Crispin Inn; 53.16453°N 1.47937°W		17th century	The public house, which was extended in the 19th century, is in gritstone with quoins and Welsh slate roofs. Both parts have two storeys and three bays. The older part on the left is rendered, and contains a doorway with side lights, and 20th-century casement windows. In the upper floor is a painted board recording the history. The later part is taller, and has coped gables. On the front are two doorways, three-light windows in the ground floor, and a garage opening, and in the upper floor are sash windows.	II
White Lion House; 53.16302°N 1.48103°W	—	Mid-17th century	The house, at one time an inn, is in gritstone, with quoins, and a Welsh slate roof with coped gables, kneelers, and ball finials. There are two storeys and an attic, and an L-shaped plan. On the front are four bays, the right bay gabled, and a lean-to on the right. In the right bay is a doorway with a quoined surround and a heavy lintel, above which is the figure of a seated lion on a moulded base. In this bay the windows are mullioned, with a single-light attic window, and the windows in the other bays date from the 19th century.	II
Rose Cottage, Butts Road; 53.16316°N 1.48086°W	—	1666	A gritstone house with quoins, and a Welsh slate roof with coped gables and kneelers. There are two storeys and four bays. The doorway has a plain surround and a canopy with bargeboards and a finial. Some of the windows are mullioned, and others are sashes. In the gable end is a doorway and a shop window, and above is a three-light mullioned window, and an initialled and dated plaque.	II
Overton Hall and outbuildings 53.15631°N 1.48317°W		Mid- to late 17th century	A small country house that has been much remodelled and extended, and used for other purposes. It is in gritstone, with quoins, string courses, a moulded eaves cornice, a parapet, and a roof of Welsh slate and stone slate. The main range has four storeys and five bays, and there are extensions forming a northeast courtyard. The southeast extension has three storeys, and contains a doorway with a moulded surround and a segmental pediment. The windows are mullioned or mullioned and transomed, and some have been altered.	II
Manor House Farmhouse; 53.18805°N 1.46112°W		1669	The farmhouse, at one time a public house, and later a private house, is in sandstone, with quoins, a string course, and stone slate roofs with coped gables and kneelers. There are two storeys, a double-depth plan, and fronts of two bays. Most of the windows are mullioned, and on the west front is an initialled datestone.	II
Milltown Farmhouse and outbuilding 53.14763°N 1.46974°W	—	1670	The farmhouse and attached outbuilding are in gritstone, with quoins, two storeys, and tile roofs with coped gables. The farmhouse has three bays, and contains a doorway with a quoined surround and lintel, and a hood mould. The windows are a mix of sashes and casements, and in the gable apex is an initialled datestone. The outbuilding to the left is lower and contains windows, a pitching hole, and an upper floor pitching doorway.	II
Wash House; 53.15231°N 1.47033°W	—	1670	A farmhouse in gritstone, with quoins, and a Welsh slate roof with coped gables and moulded kneelers. There are two storeys and attics, and four bays. The original doorway, which has a quoined surround and a massive lintel, is blocked, and a sash window has been inserted, and there is a later doorway to the left. Most of the windows are mullioned, and over the ground floor openings is a continuous hood mould. The attic contains two gabled dormers with finials.	II
Pear Tree Farmhouse; 53.16496°N 1.47873°W	—	1671	The house, which was later extended, is in gritstone with quoins and a Welsh slate roof. There are two storeys and three bays. The doorway has a chamfered and quoined surround and lintel. In the ground floor are mullioned windows with hood moulds, and the upper floor contains casement windows and an initialled and dated plaque.	II
Butts House; 53.16437°N 1.48371°W	—	Late 17th century	The house, which was later altered and extended, is in sandstone, partly rendered, and has roofs of Welsh slate, stone slate and tile, with coped gables and moulded kneelers. There are two storeys, and an L-shaped plan, with an original range of three bays, and a later cross-wing. The doorway has a massive lintel, and the windows are a mix of mullioned windows, sashes, and casements, and there is a gabled dormer.	II
Outbuilding, Clattercotes Farm; 53.13864°N 1.46638°W		Late 17th century (probable)	The outbuilding is in sandstone with a stone slate eaves course and a slate roof. There are two storeys, to the left is a lean-to extension, and to the right a garage extension. On the front is a doorway with a quoined chamfered surround and a re-set moulded ogee lintel. The building contains two mullioned windows.	II
Outbuilding, Hardwick Farm (west); 53.17956°N 1.49530°W	—	Late 17th century	The farm building is in gritstone, with quoins, stone slate eaves, and a tile roof. There are three bays, and the building contains doorways with quoined surrounds and massive lintels flanked by lancet vents. To the south is a lean-to with a segmental-arched opening, and extending northwards is a pigsty.	II
Raven House; 53.14656°N 1.47433°W		Late 17th century	A farmhouse in gritstone, with quoins, and a tile roof with coped gables and moulded kneelers. There are two storeys and attics, a symmetrical front range of three bays, the outer bays gabled, and two gabled rear wings, one a stair tower. The windows are mullioned and have hood moulds.	II
Ravensnest and farm buildings 53.15113°N 1.48235°W		Late 17th century	The house is in sandstone with a slate roof. There are two storeys and attics, and a T-shaped plan, consisting of a main range and a cross-wing on the left. The doorway has a quoined surround, most of the windows are mullioned with architraves and moulded cornices, and others have been altered. On the south front is an initialled and date plaque. To the south of the house is a courtyard enclosed by stables, cowhouses, and other farm buildings.	II
Hill Cottage; 53.16935°N 1.47870°W	—	1703	The house, which contains earlier material, was formerly a school, and was remodelled in the 19th century. It is in gritstone with quoins, oversailing eaves with bargeboards, and a Welsh slate roof. There are two stories, three bays, and a rear wing. The central doorway has a chamfered quoined surround and a massive lintel. Above the doorway is an inscribed tablet and a single light window. The other windows on the front are casements, with gablets over the upper floor windows. In the west return is a blocked three-light mullioned window and an oculus.	II
Lime Tree House; 53.16566°N 1.47853°W	—	1705	A gritstone house with quoins, and a Welsh slate roof with coped gables. There are two storeys and an attic, and two bays. The doorway has a plain lintel, with an altered window to the right. In the upper floor is a two-light mullioned window and a single-light window. The attic contains a gabled dormer, and above it is a dated and initialled plaque.	II
Common Bank; 53.15496°N 1.47133°W	—	Early 18th century	The house is mainly in limestone, with gritstone dressings and a slate roof. There are two storeys and three bays. On the front are two doorways with sandstone lintels, and the widows are mullioned with two lights and architraves.	II
Barn south of Milltown Farmhouse; 53.14746°N 1.46988°W	—	Early 18th century (probable)	The barn is in sandstone, and has a corrugated metal roof and coped gables. There is a rectangular plan, and a short gabled north wing. The barn contains sliding doors, and other doorways, some of which have quoined surrounds.	II
Gate piers and steps south of All Saints' Church; 53.16381°N 1.48008°W	—	18th century	A flight of eight steps leads up to a gateway with a pair of square gritstone piers about 2.5 metres (8 ft 2 in) high. Each pier has a moulded cornice and a ball finial on a tapering curved stem.	II
Table tomb, All Saints' Church; 53.16388°N 1.47988°W	—	Mid-18th century (probable)	The table tomb in the churchyard to the south of the church consists of a stone slab with a moulded edge. It is carried on four fluted pedestals on a four-part base slab with moulded edge.	II
Tomb chests, All Saints' Church; 53.16433°N 1.47953°W	—	Mid-18th century	The group of four tomb chests is in the churchyard near the eastern entrance. They are in sandstone, and all have moulded tops and bases, and panelled sides. The tombs have different carvings and inscriptions.	II
Butts Grange; 53.16441°N 1.48355°W	—	Mid-18th century	A substantial double-pile extension was added to the house in the mid-19th century. The house is in sandstone, and has roofs of tile and Welsh slate with coped gables. There are two and three storeys, and an irregular plan. To the west end is a doorway with a moulded surround and a rectangular fanlight, and to the north is a doorway with a flush surround and a rectangular fanlight with Gothick glazing bars. Some windows are mullioned, and others are sashes.	II
Common Bank Cottage; 53.15511°N 1.47181°W	—	Mid-18th century	The house is in carboniferous limestone with gritstone dressings, quoins, stone slate eaves courses, and a Welsh slate roof. There are two storeys and three bays. On the front are two doorways with massive surrounds and lintels, both blocked and with windows inserted. In the centre is an inserted doorway, and the windows either have single lights, or are mullioned with two lights.	II
Outbuilding, Hardwick Farm (west); 53.17937°N 1.49675°W	—	18th century	The outbuilding is in gritstone with quoins and a stone slate roof. There are two storeys and five bays. Two of the doorways have massive quoined surrounds, there is an inserted doorway, and stable doors.	II
High Ashes Farmhouse; 53.19003°N 1.48103°W		Mid-18th century	The farmhouse, possibly with an earlier core, is in gritstone, with quoins, a band, and a tile roof with coped gables and moulded kneelers. There are two storeys and an attic, and four bays. The doorway has a quoined surround and a massive lintel, and the windows are replacement casements. In the left return is a later bay window, above which is a loading doorway converted into a mullioned window.	II
Hillside Cottage; 53.16919°N 1.47725°W	—	Mid-18th century	The house is in sandstone with quoins, and a slate roof with a coped gable. It consists of a main block with three storeys and two bays, and a right wing with two storeys and two bays. There are doorways in the centre of the main block and in the left bay of the wing, the latter with a partly quoined surround. In the main block is an inserted bow window, and most of the other windows are mullioned with two lights.	II
Hockley Cottage; 53.16087°N 1.47790°W	—	Mid-18th century	A house, originally two cottages that were extended and combined. The house is in gritstone with quoins and a Welsh slate roof. There are two storeys and three bays. The main doorway has a quoined surround and a massive lintel, and to the left is a doorway with plain jambs and a shallow lintel. The windows are casements, most of which are mullioned.	II
Over Asher; 53.16916°N 1.47744°W	—	Mid-18th century	A sandstone house that has a Welsh slate roof with coped gables and kneelers. The main part has three storeys and two bays, and to the left is a lower two-storey wing. In the ground floor is a doorway, a bow window to the left, and an altered window to the right. The upper floors contain single-light windows and two-light mullioned windows. In the wing, the ground floor contains a doorway and a two-sided canted window, and in the upper floor is a casement window.	II
Rose Cottage, Hill Road; 53.16927°N 1.47807°W	—	18th century	A sandstone house that has a slate roof with coped gables and kneelers. There are two storeys, a double-depth plan, three bays, and a single-storey extension on the left. The central doorway has a bracketed cornice, and is flanked by bay windows. Above the doorway is a single-light window with an elliptical head, an architrave, and a moulded surround, and the other windows in the upper floor are sashes. The extension contains a three-light mullioned window.	II
Sheeplea House Farmhouse; 53.18355°N 1.48053°W	—	18th century	The farmhouse is in gritstone, with quoins, and a stone slate roof with coped gables and kneelers. There are two storeys, and an L-shaped plan, with a front range of three bays, and a gabled cross-wing extending to the north. The central doorway has a massive surround and lintel, and the windows are mullioned. There are doorways in the gable end and in the cross-wing.	II
Outbuildings, Sheeplea House Farm; 53.18365°N 1.48047°W	—	Mid-18th century	The farm buildings are in gritstone with quoins, and form two ranges. The northern range has a roof of sheeting with coped gables and kneelers. It is stepped, and contains a doorway with a quoined surround and a deep lintel, and a flight of steps leading to a doorway in the upper level. It is linked by a wall to the western range that has two storeys, and a roof of Welsh slate, and it contains a blocked doorway with a quoined surround.	II
Slack Lane Farmhouse; 53.16160°N 1.50421°W	—	18th century	The farmhouse, later a private house, is in gritstone with quoins and a stone slate roof. There are two storeys and three bays. The doorway has a massive surround and a deep lintel, and the windows are mullioned. At the rear is a catslide roof.	II
Stubben Edge Cottage; 53.15286°N 1.46085°W		Mid-18th century	A sandstone house with a thatched roof, it has two storeys, and three bays flanked by lower two-storey single-bay wings. There are two doorways, one with a quoined surround and a large lintel. In the outer bays of the main house are horizontally-sliding sash windows, and most of the other windows have been altered.	II
The Old Bank House and wall 53.16295°N 1.48055°W	—	Mid-18th century	The house is in gritstone, with quoins, and a Welsh slate roof with coped gables and moulded kneelers. There are three storeys and three bays. The central doorway has an architrave, and a pediment on console brackets, and above it is a two-storey stair window. The other windows are mullioned with two lights, and to the right is a wall linking with the adjacent house, containing a doorway.	II
The Old Rectory; 53.16374°N 1.47951°W	—	Mid-18th century	The remodelling of an earlier house, and later altered and extended, it is in gritstone with a stone slate roof. There are two storeys, seven bays, the left two bays recessed, and a single-storey extension on the right. The doorway has an open porch with Tuscan columns, a cornice and ball finials. In the third bay is a stair window, and the other windows are sashes.	II
West Bank, wall, gate piers and outbuilding 53.16318°N 1.48001°W		Mid-18th century	A gritstone house with quoins, a band, an eaves cornice, and a Welsh slate roof with coped gables and moulded kneelers. There are three storeys and an L-shaped plan, consisting of a front range of four bays, and a rear wing with two storeys and two bays. The central doorway has a moulded surround, a rectangular fanlight, and a cornice. The ground floor windows are casements, and in the upper floor the windows either have single lights or are mullioned. In front of the house is a wall with railings, and square gate and corner piers, each with a moulded cornice and a domed top. To the right is an attached two-storey outbuilding containing a round-headed doorway with a keystone.	II
West View; 53.14545°N 1.46395°W		18th century	The house is in gritstone, with quoins, and a roof of stone slate and tile with coped gables and moulded kneelers. There are two storeys, an attic and a basement, and a T-shaped plan, consisting of a symmetrical front of three bays, and a lower two-storey rear wing. The central doorway has a semicircular fanlight and a broken pediment. The windows are sashes, the window above the doorway with a moulded surround and a keystone. In the east gable end is a blocked doorway with a massive surround and lintel.	II
Dalebank Farmhouse; 53.15129°N 1.46161°W	—	Mid- to late 18th century	The farmhouse is in sandstone and has a stone slate roof with coped gables. There are two storeys, three bays and a rear outshut. On the front is a porch and a doorway with a quoined surround, and most of the windows are mullioned, with some mullions removed.	II
Spring Cottage; 53.17065°N 1.48113°W	—	Mid or late 18th century	Three cottages combined into one house, it is in sandstone, with a slate roof, two storeys and four bays. On the front are two doorways with quoined surrounds. Some of the windows have a single light, and the others are mullioned with two lights.	II
Ashcroft and Ashcroft Cottage; 53.16297°N 1.48080°W	—	Late 18th century	A pair of houses in gritstone with a Welsh slate roof, hipped on the left, and with a coped gable on the right. There are two storeys and five bays. In the centre is a segmental-arched carriage entrance, with voussoirs and a keystone. Each house has a doorway, and most of the windows are casements.	II
Dale Cottage Farmhouse; 53.15052°N 1.46314°W		Late 18th century	The farmhouse is in gritstone, with quoins, and a Welsh slate roof with coped gables and plain kneelers. It consists of a main range of two storeys and three bays, and an older range attached at an angle. The doorway is in the centre of the main range, there is one 19th-century sash window, and the other windows are mullioned.	II
Footbridge; 53.16152°N 1.48101°W		Late 18th century	The bridge carries a track over the River Amber. It is in gritstone, and consists of a single shallow segmental arch. The bridge has splayed abutments, and low square piers with shallow pyramidal caps.	II
Old Post Office Cottage; 53.16337°N 1.48028°W	—	Late 18th century (or earlier)	A house in a terrace in gritstone with a Welsh slate roof. There are two storeys and two bays. In the ground floor is a doorway, to its left is a restored two-light mullioned window, and the upper floor contains sash windows.	II
Outbuilding southwest of the Old Rectory and wall 53.16356°N 1.47998°W	—	Late 18th century	The outbuilding is in gritstone on a plinth, with quoins, and hipped and gabled roofs of Welsh slate and stone slate, with coped gables and kneelers. The building is on sloping ground, in two ranges with two storeys. The openings include windows, a doorway with a quoined surround converted into a sash window, and a dovecote entry with a triangular platform and perch. Attached is a boundary wall with plain copings and quoins, about 24 metres (79 ft) long.	II
Redfern House; 53.16272°N 1.47992°W	—	Late 18th century	A gritstone house, with quoins, a coved eaves band, and a Welsh slate roof with coped gables and kneelers. There are two storeys, and a T-shaped plan, with a front range of three bays, and a gabled rear wing. The central doorway has a massive surround and a lintel with a plaque and a cornice. Above it is a blind round-arched opening with imposts and a keystone. The outer bays contain casement windows, and in the rear wing is a mullioned opening.	II
The Cottage; 53.16332°N 1.48030°W	—	Late 18th century	The house is in sandstone and has a Welsh slate roof with coped gables and kneelers. There are three storeys and two bays. The central doorway has a rectangular fanlight and a plain lintel, to its left is a shop window, and the other windows are sashes.	II
Toll Bar Cottage; 53.18865°N 1.47079°W		Late 18th century	The former toll house, which was later extended, is in gritstone, with quoins, and a roof of Welsh slate and stone slate with coped gables. There are two storeys, a front of two bays, and an extension to the rear. The doorway has a quoined surround and a massive lintel, and the windows either have a single light, or are mullioned with two lights.	II
Weavers' Cottages; 53.17047°N 1.48072°W		Late 18th century	A row of cottages of differing heights, later combined. They are in gritstone, with quoins, and roofs of Welsh slate and stone slate with a coped gable at the east end. There are two storeys and five bays, the left two bays projecting, and the right bay recessed. On the front are two doorways with massive jambs and lintels, and a blocked doorway. Most of the windows are mullioned.	II
Yew Tree Farmhouse; 53.18348°N 1.45325°W	—	Late 18th century	The farmhouse is in sandstone, and has a slate roof with a sandstone ridge and coped gables. There are two storeys, a T-shaped plan, and two bays. On the front is a porch with a coped gable, the windows are mullioned with two lights, and there is a narrow stair window with a transom.	II
Fallgate Mill; 53.15649°N 1.47187°W		1781	A water-powered corn mill incorporating earlier material, it was restored in 1987–88. The mill is in gritstone and carboniferous limestone, with quoins, and roofs of stone slate and pantile. There is an irregular L-shaped plan, with a main range of three storeys and three bays, a range at right angles to the east, and a further single-storey range in brick. In the main range is a doorway with a massive surround and an initialled and dated lintel. There are various openings, including a loading door, and at the west is a wheelpit containing an overshot waterwheel.	II
Stable Block, Butts Grange; 53.16478°N 1.48368°W	—	1790	The stable block, later converted into dwellings, is in sandstone, and has a tile roof with coped gables and kneelers. There are two storeys and five bays. In the ground floor are five doorways, the central one with a quoined surround and a massive lintel. The adjacent doorways have semicircular-arched heads, imposts and keystones, and the doorway in the right bay has a segmental head. In the upper floor are four two-light mullioned windows, and in the centre is a gabled dormer dovecote containing two tiers of entry holes with perches and semicircular platforms. At the northeast gable end is a doorway with a dated lintel, and external steps leading to a taking-in door.	II
Appletree Farmhouse and wall 53.17031°N 1.47671°W	—	1794	The house is in gritstone, and has a Welsh slate roof with coped gables and kneelers. There are two storeys, an L-shaped plan, and a front range of three bays. The central doorway has a massive surround and lintel, and a rectangular fanlight. Above the doorway is a dated and initialled plaque with a moulded cornice, and a semicircular-arched window with a projecting keystone. The other windows are sashes. In front of the house is a wall of flagstones on edge about 1 metre (3 ft 3 in) high, with square gate piers.	II
Pinfold, Milltown; 53.15113°N 1.47092°W		18th or 19th century	The village pinfold is in gritstone, and consists of a rectangular enclosure. The walls have triangular copings, and flanking the central entry are massive gate piers.	II
Summerhouse, Overton Hall; 53.15679°N 1.48306°W	—	Late 18th or early 19th century (possible)	The summer house in the grounds of the hall has sandstone walls, monolithic Doric sandstone columns, possibly re-used, and a hipped pantile roof with sandstone ridges. It has a rectangular plan, and is open on two sides.	II
Spann Carr Windmill; 53.19086°N 1.48951°W		1807	The former windmill is in gritstone, and consists of a tapering circular tower with four stages. It contains three doorways with massive jambs and deep lintels, and rectangular window openings.	II
Outbuilding east of Spann Carr Windmill; 53.19077°N 1.48924°W	—	c. 1807	The outbuilding is in gritstone with a stone slate roof. There is one storey and a loft, and five bays. In the ground floor are paired doorways, and the loft contains a doorway approached by external steps, with diagonally tooled jambs and a lintel.	II
Ashover Hay Primitive Methodist Chapel; 53.14595°N 1.46698°W		1824	The chapel, which was enlarged in 1870, is in gritstone with stone slate eaves courses, and a Welsh slate roof. The front is gabled and has a lean-to on the right. It contains a doorway and flanking sash windows, all with semicircular-arched heads, archivolts, and projecting keystones. Above the doorway is an inscribed plaque.	II
House adjoining Lime Tree House; 53.16554°N 1.47857°W	—	Early 19th century	The house, which was extended in the 20th century, is in gritstone with quoins. The original part has a stone slate roof, and the extension roof is in Welsh slate. The original part has two storeys and one bay, and the extension is recessed, with one storey and one bay. The doorway has a massive stone surround, and the windows are sashes.	II
Chimney, Ravensnest; 53.15159°N 1.48520°W		Early to mid-19th century	Originally the chimney of the engine house of a mine, it is in gritstone. The chimney is square, tapering and slightly stepped, with an oversailing course and corner piers at the top giving an embattled appearance.	II
Outbuilding, High Ashes Farm; 53.18994°N 1.48145°W	—	1844	Originally a stable and cowhouse, the outbuilding is in gritstone, and has roofs of stone slate and tile, with coped gables and moulded kneelers. In the centre is a two-storey gabled range with an attic, flanked by single-storey three-bay wings with hipped roofs. The central range contains a doorway with a quoined surround and a dated lintel, above which is a semicircular-headed opening, and in the attic is a dovecote with six entry holes. The wings contain doorways and windows, and at the rear are external steps to an upper floor doorway.	II
Former National Girls School; 53.16418°N 1.47911°W		1845	The former school is in gritstone on a plinth, with a moulded eaves cornice and blocking course, and a tile roof. There are two storeys and three bays, with corner buttresses. In the centre bay is a projecting two-storey porch with a coped Dutch gable. It is flanked by corner piers, and contains a doorway with a moulded surround, and an arched lintel with a hood mould, above which is a dated plaque, and a quatrefoil. The outer bays contain tall three-light mullioned windows, the lights with arched heads. On the returns are crow-stepped gables.	II
Bridge south of Wash Farmhouse; 53.15165°N 1.47006°W	—	1846	The bridge carries a road over the River Amber. It is in gritstone, and consists of a single semicircular arch. The bridge has voussoirs, shallow parapets with flat copings, and curved and splayed abutments.	II
Cemetery Chapel; 53.16523°N 1.47999°W	—	Mid 19th century	The chapel is in sandstone, and has a slate roof with coped gables, kneelers, and pyramidal apex finials. The openings have chamfered surrounds and pointed heads, the gable window with Gothick glazing.	II
Churchside Cottage; 53.16344°N 1.48025°W	—	19th century	A house in gritstone with quoins, and a tile roof with a coped gable at the east end. There are three storeys and three bays. The windows are sashes, and the former central doorway has been converted into a window.	II
Telephone kiosk 53.16327°N 1.48005°W		1935	The K6 type telephone kiosk in Church Street was designed by Giles Gilbert Scott. Constructed in cast iron with a square plan and a dome, it has three unperforated crowns in the top panels.	II
Gate piers east of All Saints' Church; 53.16433°N 1.47948°W	—	20th century (probable)	At the east entrance to the churchyard are a vehicle and a pedestrian entrance flanked by three gate piers built from blocks cut from 18th-century gravestones. They are in sandstone with a square plan, and each pier has a cornice top, and a flat cap moulded on three sides.	II
