= 2023 North East Derbyshire District Council election =

2023 English local election

- 4 May 2023

All 53 seats to North East Derbyshire District Council 27 seats needed for a majority

	First party	Second party	Third party
Leader	Nigel Barker	Alex Dale	Ross Shipman
Party	Labour	Conservative	Liberal Democrats
Last election	18 seats, 35.4%	30 seats, 46.7%	3 seats, 13.6%
Seats before	18 (Note: Including one vacant seat at North Wingfield previously held by Labour councillor Jeff Lilley prior to his resignation in April 2023.)	26 (Note: Including one vacant seat at Dronfield South previously held by Conservative councillor Alan Powell prior to his resignation in April 2023.)	3
Seats won	28	19	3
Seats after	27	19	3
Seat change	▲10	▼11	Steady
Popular vote	26,216	23,320	6,578
Percentage	43.1%	38.3%	10.8%
Swing	▲7.7%	▼8.4%	▼2.8%
	Fourth party	Fifth party
Leader		Frank Adlington-Stringer
Party	Independent	Green
Last election	2 seats, 2.4%	0 seats, 1.9%
Seats before	6	0
Seats won	2	1
Seats after	3	1
Seat change	Steady	▲1
Popular vote	2,562	2,208
Percentage	4.2%	3.6%
Swing	▲1.8%	▲1.7%
- Winner of each seat at the 2023 North East Derbyshire District Council election
Leader before election
Alex Dale
Conservative
No overall control
Leader after election
Nigel Barker
Labour

The 2023 North East Derbyshire District Council election took place on 4 May 2023 to elect all 53 members of North East Derbyshire District Council in Derbyshire, England. This was on the same day as other local elections across England.

Prior to the election the council was under no overall control, being led by a Conservative minority administration. The Conservatives had won a majority of the seats at the 2019 election, but a series of defections saw them lose their majority in November 2022.

The election saw Labour win a majority of the seats on the council. Labour group leader Nigel Barker was appointed leader of the council at the subsequent annual council meeting on 22 May 2023.

== Results summary ==
=== Election result ===
2023 North East Derbyshire District Council election
Party	Candidates	Seats	Gains	Losses	Net gain/loss	Seats %	Votes %	Votes	+/−
Labour	52	28	10	0	▲10	52.8	43.1	26,216	+7.7
Conservative	53	19	0	11	▼11	35.8	38.3	23,320	–8.4
Liberal Democrats	48	3	0	0	Steady	3.8	10.8	6,578	–2.8
Independent	8	2	1	1	Steady	3.8	4.2	2,562	+1.8
Green	3	1	1	0	▲1	1.9	3.6	2,208	+1.7

== Ward results ==
The results for each ward were as follows, with an asterisk (*) indicating a sitting councillor standing for re-election.

=== Ashover ===
Ashover
Party	Candidate	Votes	%	±%
Independent	Helen Wetherall	387	49.6	N/A
Conservative	James William Armitage* (William Armitage)	244	31.3	−45.3
Labour	Gail Blamire	75	9.6	+1.3
Liberal Democrats	Lee Clarke	74	9.5	−5.5
Majority		143	18.3	
Turnout		780	47.87	+5.43
Independent gain from Conservative		Swing		

=== Barlow and Holmesfield ===
Barlow and Holmesfield
Party	Candidate	Votes	%	±%
Conservative	Pamela Jones	371	63.3	−2.0
Labour	Susan Allenby	141	24.1	+2.6
Liberal Democrats	John Wilcock	74	12.6	−0.7
Majority		230	39.2	
Turnout		586	37.37	−0.10
Conservative hold		Swing		

=== Brampton and Walton ===
Brampton and Walton
Party	Candidate	Votes	%	±%
Conservative	Martin Thacker*	735	62.9	−8.4
Conservative	Peter Elliott*	695	59.5	−8.5
Labour	Michael Gordon	325	27.8	+8.0
Labour	Hannah Bazley	300	25.7	+13.9
Liberal Democrats	Sarah Evans	133	11.4	−2.1
Liberal Democrats	Paula Maude	79	6.8	N/A
Majority		370	31.7	
Turnout		1,169	42.34	−3.17
Conservative hold		Swing		
Conservative hold		Swing		

=== Clay Cross North ===
Clay Cross North
Party	Candidate	Votes	%	±%
Labour	Geoffrey Morley*	842	50.4	+0.7
Labour	Kathleen Rouse*	765	45.8	+2.3
Labour	Nicola Morley	759	45.5	−1.3
Conservative	Jessica Clark	684	41.0	+12.3
Conservative	Christopher Nolan	631	37.8	+9.8
Conservative	David Sankey	591	35.4	+10.4
Liberal Democrats	Leah Shafik	147	8.8	−4.3
Liberal Democrats	John Ahern	143	8.6	−7.4
Liberal Democrats	Carly Howard	136	8.1	−6.7
Majority		75	4.5	
Turnout		1,669	31.43	
Labour hold		Swing		
Labour hold		Swing		
Labour hold		Swing		

=== Clay Cross South ===
Clay Cross South
Party	Candidate	Votes	%	±%
Labour	Derrick Skinner	476	58.6	−1.9
Labour	Frances Petersen	469	57.8	+0.5
Conservative	Yvonne Shaw	238	29.3	+11.3
Conservative	Derek Ball	232	28.6	+11.8
Liberal Democrats	Robert Rogerson	57	7.0	−3.7
Liberal Democrats	Alan Marshall	55	6.8	N/A
Majority		231	28.5	
Turnout		812	29.34	+3.88
Labour hold		Swing		
Labour hold		Swing		

=== Coal Aston ===
Coal Aston
Party	Candidate	Votes	%	±%
Conservative	Mark Foster*	559	43.3	−14.5
Conservative	Richard Spooner	475	36.8	−30.1
Independent	Anthony Hutchinson*	473	36.6	−30.3
Labour	Rachel Steele	342	26.5	+3.4
Labour	Jonathan Williams	300	23.2	+2.1
Independent	Paul Parkin*	276	21.4	N/A
Liberal Democrats	Pauline Marriott	37	2.9	−8.6
Liberal Democrats	Timothy Ramshaw	25	1.9	−5.3
Majority		419	44.7	
Turnout		1,292	44.66	+3.60
Conservative hold		Swing		
Conservative hold		Swing		

Anthony Hutchinson had been elected in 2019 as a Conservative but left the party in November 2022 to sit as an independent councillor. Seat shown as Conservative hold to allow for comparison with 2019 election. Paul Parkin had been elected in 2019 as a Conservative in Dronfield North ward. He also left the party in November 2022 to sit as an independent.

=== Dronfield North ===
Dronfield North
Party	Candidate	Votes	%	±%
Labour	Graham Baxter	445	52.5	+13.4
Labour	Christine Smith	429	50.6	+12.4
Conservative	Martin Hanrahan	315	37.2	−11.2
Conservative	Philip Wright*	312	36.8	−9.6
Liberal Democrats	Wendy Temple	93	11.0	−0.8
Liberal Democrats	Adrienne Wilcock	62	7.3	−4.1
Majority		114	13.4	
Turnout		847	30.05	−2.27
Labour gain from Conservative		Swing		
Labour gain from Conservative		Swing		

One of the Dronfield North seats had been held by Paul Parkin who had been elected in 2019 as a Conservative but left the party in November 2022 to sit as an independent councillor. Seat show as previously Conservative to allow for comparison with 2019 results. Parkin stood as a candidate in Coal Aston rather than Dronfield North in 2023.

=== Dronfield South ===
Dronfield South
Party	Candidate	Votes	%	±%
Labour	David Cheetham	779	43.7	+23.7
Labour	Caroline Smith	752	42.2	+22.7
Conservative	William Jones	736	41.3	−10.1
Conservative	Angelique Foster*	730	41.0	−19.1
Conservative	Marie Ireland	716	40.2	−10.3
Labour	John Yates	671	37.7	+20.6
Liberal Democrats	Alison Ball	349	19.6	+4.2
Liberal Democrats	Richard Moore	191	10.7	−4.1
Liberal Democrats	Camille Ramshaw	188	10.6	−1.9
Majority		6	0.3	
Turnout		1,781	37.50	−0.95
Labour gain from Conservative		Swing		
Labour gain from Conservative		Swing		
Conservative hold		Swing		

=== Dronfield Woodhouse ===
Dronfield Woodhouse
Party	Candidate	Votes	%	±%
Conservative	Kevin Tait	297	46.9	−17.9
Labour	Roland Lovatt	209	33.0	+13.7
Independent	Roger Hall*	68	10.7	−54.1
Liberal Democrats	Emma Harpham	50	7.9	−8.0
Majority		88	13.9	
Turnout		633	41.61	+1.96
Conservative hold		Swing		

Roger Hall had been elected as a Conservative in 2019, but left the party to sit as an independent councillor in September 2022. Seat shown as Conservative hold to allow for comparison with 2019 result.

=== Eckington North ===
Eckington North
Party	Candidate	Votes	%	±%
Labour	Richard Beech	516	52.1	+18.5
Labour	Christine Gare	503	50.8	+20.4
Conservative	Cristian Gomez Reaney*	439	44.3	−2.9
Conservative	Jeremy Kenyon*	425	42.9	−4.7
Majority		64	6.5	
Turnout		990	33.71	+2.30
Labour gain from Conservative		Swing		
Labour gain from Conservative		Swing		

=== Eckington South and Renishaw ===
Eckington South and Renishaw
Party	Candidate	Votes	%	±%
Labour	Kathleen Clegg	670	58.4	+9.8
Labour	Stephen Pickering*	600	52.3	+11.8
Labour	Stuart Fawcett	537	46.8	+7.0
Conservative	Philip Wheelhouse	383	33.4	−2.3
Conservative	Jennifer Archer	363	31.6	+0.2
Conservative	Philippa Allan	349	30.4	+2.7
Liberal Democrats	Lois Gent	63	5.5	−5.8
Liberal Democrats	Philip Kay	55	4.8	N/A
Liberal Democrats	Gustaf Degen	54	4.7	N/A
Majority		154	13.4	
Turnout		1,148	24.73	+0.82
Labour hold		Swing		
Labour hold		Swing		
Labour hold		Swing		

=== Gosforth Valley ===
Gosforth Valley
Party	Candidate	Votes	%	±%
Conservative	Michelle Emmens*	985	50.5	−9.9
Conservative	Lilian Deighton*	944	48.4	−10.8
Conservative	Richard Welton*	922	47.3	−10.1
Labour	John Laxton	631	32.4	+11.7
Labour	Samuel Ohene	628	32.2	+10.7
Labour	John Whiteley	601	30.8	+9.5
Liberal Democrats	Simon Temple	361	18.5	+0.9
Liberal Democrats	Regina Kay	294	15.1	+0.9
Liberal Democrats	Samuel Kay	264	13.5	−3.0
Majority		291	14.9	
Turnout		1,949	43.03	+1.39
Conservative hold		Swing		
Conservative hold		Swing		
Conservative hold		Swing		

=== Grassmoor ===
Grassmoor
Party	Candidate	Votes	%	±%
Labour	Lee Hartshorne*	545	69.3	+10.0
Labour	Michael Durrant	511	65.0	+3.4
Conservative	Fiona Turner	156	19.8	+4.7
Conservative	Derrick Willmot	149	19.0	+4.3
Liberal Democrats	Antony Bingham	75	9.5	−6.9
Liberal Democrats	Nadine Hart	73	9.3	−6.8
Majority		355	45.2	
Turnout		786	25.12	−1.79
Labour hold		Swing		
Labour hold		Swing		

=== Holmewood and Heath ===
Holmewood and Heath
Party	Candidate	Votes	%	±%
Labour	Suzy Cornwell Ball*	460	60.1	+3.0
Labour	Lee Stone*	411	53.7	+2.8
Conservative	Zena Wharmby	216	28.2	−0.7
Conservative	Clifford Berry	204	26.7	−0.8
Liberal Democrats	Julia Vongyer	88	11.5	−3.3
Liberal Democrats	Mark Vongyer	84	11.0	N/A
Majority		143	22.0	
Turnout		765	23.50	+0.71
Labour hold		Swing		
Labour hold		Swing		

=== Killamarsh East ===
Killamarsh East
Party	Candidate	Votes	%	±%
Labour	Tony Lacey*	379	47.4	+2.0
Conservative	Stephen Reed	367	45.9	−5.7
Conservative	Wendy Tinley	359	44.9	−1.3
Labour	John Windle	359	44.9	−1.2
Liberal Democrats	June Hancock	50	6.3	N/A
Liberal Democrats	Keith Windley	27	3.4	N/A
Majority		8	1.0	
Turnout		799	27.83	+0.96
Labour gain from Conservative		Swing		
Conservative hold		Swing		

=== Killamarsh West ===
Killamarsh West
Party	Candidate	Votes	%	±%
Labour	Clive Fletcher	504	46.8	+2.3
Labour	Carol Lacey	496	46.1	+2.5
Conservative	Stephen Clough*	442	41.1	−7.8
Labour	Billie Morris	406	37.7	−5.7
Conservative	David Drabble	384	35.7	−16.5
Conservative	Adrian Platts	343	31.9	−16.8
Independent	Maureen Potts* (Mo Potts)	242	22.5	−26.2
Liberal Democrats	Mark Firth	111	10.3	N/A
Liberal Democrats	Kane Kehoe	83	7.7	N/A
Majority		36	3.4	
Turnout		1,076	25.87	−0.07
Labour gain from Conservative		Swing		
Labour gain from Conservative		Swing		
Conservative hold		Swing		

Mo Potts had been elected in 2019 as a Conservative, but left the party to sit as an independent councillor in July 2022. Her seat shown as previously Conservative to allow comparison with 2019 results.

=== North Wingfield Central ===
North Wingfield Central
Party	Candidate	Votes	%	±%
Labour	Nigel Barker*	860	69.0	+7.6
Labour	Jayne Barry*	805	64.6	+10.2
Labour	Michael Smith	736	59.0	+7.4
Conservative	Andrew Markwell	285	22.9	−0.8
Conservative	Katherine Burrow	238	19.1	+0.8
Conservative	Richard Embrey	216	17.3	+0.7
Liberal Democrats	Michelle Bingham	108	8.7	−10.1
Liberal Democrats	Wendy Smalley	72	5.8	−8.9
Liberal Democrats	Edwin Maude	63	5.1	−6.4
Majority		451	36.1	
Turnout		1,247	27.08	+0.60
Labour hold		Swing		
Labour hold		Swing		
Labour hold		Swing		

=== Pilsley and Morton ===
Pilsley and Morton
Party	Candidate	Votes	%	±%
Labour	Kevin Gillott*	1,031	71.7	+34.6
Labour	Daniel Higgon	775	53.9	+20.0
Independent	Andrew Cooper*	573	39.8	−11.2
Independent	John Funnell*	443	30.8	−5.8
Conservative	Ritchie Knowles	208	14.5	−3.4
Conservative	James Miller	175	12.2	−1.7
Conservative	Simon Temperton	144	10.0	−1.9
Liberal Democrats	William Ramshaw	127	8.8	−3.9
Majority		130	9.0	
Turnout		1,438	33.17	+1.00
Labour hold		Swing		
Labour gain from Independent		Swing		
Independent hold		Swing		

=== Ridgeway and Marsh Lane ===
Ridgeway and Marsh Lane
Party	Candidate	Votes	%	±%
Conservative	Carolyn Renwick*	312	56.8	−3.2
Labour	Trevor Back	130	23.7	−7.2
Liberal Democrats	Sarah Marsh	107	19.5	+10.4
Majority		182	33.1	
Turnout		549	39.65	−3.42
Conservative hold		Swing		

=== Shirland ===
Shirland
Party	Candidate	Votes	%	±%
Conservative	Charlotte Cupit*	819	54.4	−1.7
Conservative	Heather Liggett*	651	43.2	−1.5
Conservative	Michael Roe*	630	41.8	−1.2
Labour	Janice Hacz	598	39.7	+3.9
Labour	Barry Barnes	544	36.1	+1.7
Labour	Christine Arnold	464	30.8	+0.9
Liberal Democrats	Ian Barfield	163	10.8	+0.3
Liberal Democrats	Nicholas Rusbridge	98	6.5	−1.1
Liberal Democrats	David Murphy	63	4.2	N/A
Majority		32	2.1	
Turnout		1,506	31.34	+0.10
Conservative hold		Swing		
Conservative hold		Swing		
Conservative hold		Swing		

=== Sutton ===
Sutton
Party	Candidate	Votes	%	±%
Labour	Joseph Birkin*	499	53.0	+3.3
Labour	Patrick Kerry*	494	52.5	+2.8
Conservative	Barry Lewis	318	33.8	−0.4
Conservative	Sanjoy Sen	293	31.1	−1.3
Liberal Democrats	Laura McPheely	104	11.1	−2.5
Liberal Democrats	Coral Pollendine	51	5.4	N/A
Majority		176	18.7	
Turnout		941	29.44	+3.72
Labour hold		Swing		
Labour hold		Swing		

=== Tupton ===
Tupton
Party	Candidate	Votes	%	±%
Liberal Democrats	Ross Shipman*	609	45.0	+5.9
Liberal Democrats	David Hancock*	582	43.0	−2.9
Liberal Democrats	Pamela Windley*	508	37.5	−1.7
Labour	John Cooper	506	37.4	+8.5
Labour	Stephen Peters	497	36.7	+8.3
Labour	Ross Griffin	424	31.3	+6.0
Conservative	Mark Faulkner	258	19.1	−9.0
Conservative	Gary Green	220	16.3	−10.1
Conservative	Harry Smith	209	15.4	−7.4
Majority		2	0.1	
Turnout		1,353	31.57	−3.88
Liberal Democrats hold		Swing		
Liberal Democrats hold		Swing		
Liberal Democrats hold		Swing		

=== Unstone ===
Unstone
Party	Candidate	Votes	%	±%
Conservative	Alexander Dale*	308	54.2	−8.8
Labour	Janet Hill	230	40.5	+9.7
Liberal Democrats	Jill Cantrell	30	5.3	−0.8
Majority		78	13.7	
Turnout		568	39.89	+3.54
Conservative hold		Swing		

=== Wingerworth ===
Wingerworth
Party	Candidate	Votes	%	±%
Green	Frank Adlington-Stringer	1,004	51.9	+28.8
Conservative	Patricia Antcliff*	710	36.7	−19.6
Conservative	Neil Baker	707	36.6	−12.9
Conservative	Diana Ruff*	628	32.5	−18.2
Green	Lesley Kovacsh Whetton	606	31.3	N/A
Green	David Kesteven	598	30.9	N/A
Labour	Paul Addison	311	16.1	+1.1
Labour	Christopher Quinn	278	14.4	+0.3
Labour	Gemma Styles	198	10.2	−3.3
Liberal Democrats	Dean Murphy	114	5.9	−16.2
Liberal Democrats	Nicola Smith	109	5.6	−10.6
Independent	Jean Yeomans	100	5.2	N/A
Liberal Democrats	Kristofer Lancey	95	4.9	−8.3
Majority		294	15.2	
Turnout		1,934	44.30	+1.10
Green gain from Conservative		Swing		
Conservative hold		Swing		
Conservative hold		Swing		

== Changes 2023–2027 ==
=== Clay Cross North ===
Clay Cross North By-Election 10 October 2024
Party	Candidate	Votes	%	±%
Conservative	Jessica Stokes	624	51.0	+10.1
Labour	Emma Green	356	29.1	–21.3
Green	Ash Farrand	175	14.3	N/A
Liberal Democrats	Hannah Shafik	69	5.6	–3.1
Majority		268	21.9	N/A
Turnout		1,224	22.1	–9.3
Conservative gain from Labour		Swing	▲15.7	

- Ross Shipman, David Hancock, and Pam Windley (all elected as Liberal Democrats) and Mike Roe (elected as a Conservative) left their parties in December 2024 to become independents, forming a new group with independent councillor Heather Liggett.
- Stephen Reed, elected as a Conservative, left the party and joined Reform UK in February 2025.

=== Eckington South & Renishaw ===
Eckington South & Renishaw By-Election, 10th September 2026
Party	Candidate	Votes	%	±%
Reform	Jamie Hodgson	426	40.2	N/A
Labour	David Landall	298	28.1	−31.9
Conservative	Philip Wheelhouse	229	22.6	−12.7
Independent	Jackie Foster	55	5.2	N/A
Green	Hannah Court	52	4.9	N/A
Majority		128	12.1	N/A
Turnout		1068	23.2	−1.5
Reform gain from Labour		Swing		
