= Dover District Council elections =

Local government elections in Kent, England

Dover District Council is the local authority for the Dover District in Kent, England. The council is elected every four years.

== Council composition ==
Composition of the council
Year	Conservative	Labour	Liberal Democrats (Note: Includes totals for the predecessors of the Liberal Democrats, the Liberal Party and SDP (both of which participated in the Alliance).)	UKIP	Independents & Others	Council control after election
Local government reorganisation; council established (55 seats)
1973	29	21	0	–	5	Conservative
1976	35	17	0	–	3	Conservative
New ward boundaries (56 seats)
1979	35	19	1	–	1	Conservative
1983	39	17	0	–	0	Conservative
1987	33	19	4	–	0	Conservative
1991	28	21	6	–	1	No overall control
1995	13	39	4	0	0	Labour
1999	26	28	1	0	1	No overall control
New ward boundaries (45 seats)
2003	22	20	3	0	0	No overall control
2007	28	15	2	0	0	Conservative
2011	26	19	0	0	0	Conservative
2015	25	17	0	3	0	Conservative
New ward boundaries (32 seats)
2019	19	12	0	0	1	Conservative
2023	14	17	0	0	1	Labour

== Borough result maps ==
2003 results map

2007 results map

2011 results map

2015 results map

2019 results map

2023 results map

== By-election results ==
=== 1999-2003 ===
Middle Deal By-Election 16 December 1999
Party	Candidate	Votes	%	±%
Labour		755	50.3	−16.0
Conservative		665	44.3	+10.6
Liberal Democrats		81	5.4	+5.4
Majority		90	6.0	
Turnout		1,501	30.2	
Labour hold		Swing		

Castle By-Election 18 May 2000
Party	Candidate	Votes	%	±%
Conservative		558	69.2	+7.4
Labour		248	30.8	−7.4
Majority		310	38.4	
Turnout		806	34.1	
Conservative hold		Swing		

St Margarets-at-Cliffe By-Election 13 April 2000
Party	Candidate	Votes	%	±%
Conservative		619	71.2	+1.6
Labour		158	18.2	−13.0
Liberal Democrats		92	10.6	+1.6
Majority		461	53.0	
Turnout		869	35.2	
Conservative hold		Swing		

Noningstone By-Election 8 March 2001
Party	Candidate	Votes	%	±%
Conservative		245	59.5	−7.1
Labour		99	24.0	−9.4
Liberal Democrats		68	16.5	+16.5
Majority		146	35.5	
Turnout		412	35.2	
Conservative hold		Swing		

=== 2003-2007 ===
St Margaret's-At-Cliffe By-Election 15 April 2004
Party	Candidate	Votes	%	±%
Conservative	Margaret Philpott	749	60.5	−0.3
Liberal Democrats	Patrick Acarnley	234	18.9	+18.9
Labour	John Adams	214	17.2	−4.9
Independent	Stewart Dimmock	43	3.5	+0.0
Majority		515	41.6	
Turnout		1,239	34.5	
Conservative hold		Swing		

Walmer By-Election 23 June 2005
Party	Candidate	Votes	%	±%
Conservative	Christopher Smith	1,031	61.0	+0.2
Labour	Ernest Brimmell	449	26.5	−12.7
Liberal Democrats	John Featherstone	211	12.5	+12.5
Majority		582	34.5	
Turnout		1,691	29.2	
Conservative hold		Swing		

Little Stour & Ashstone By-Election 20 July 2006 (2)
Party	Candidate	Votes	%	±%
Conservative	Susan Chandler	892		
Conservative	Jane Sheridan	748		
Liberal Democrats	Bryan Curtis	336		
Liberal Democrats	Sheila Smith	254		
Labour	Benet Bano	111		
Labour	Ernest Brimmel	110		
Turnout		2,451	24.3	
Conservative hold		Swing		
Conservative gain from Liberal Democrats		Swing		

=== 2007-2011 ===
Aylesham By-Election 27 September 2007
Party	Candidate	Votes	%	±%
Labour	Robert Thompson	661	79.7	+11.4
Conservative	Marianne Ford	108	13.0	−12.6
Independent	Reginald Hansell	59	7.1	+0.9
Independent	Edward Lee-Delisle	1	0.1	+0.1
Majority		553	66.7	
Turnout		829	23.7	
Labour hold		Swing		

Maxton, Elms Vale and Priory By-Election 27 September 2007
Party	Candidate	Votes	%	±%
Labour	Viviane Revell	365	33.7	−3.3
Liberal Democrats	John Mackie	274	25.3	+6.1
Conservative	Jennifer Morgan	252	23.3	−8.2
Independent	Graham Wanstall	70	6.5	−5.8
UKIP	Peter Campbell-Marshall	65	6.0	+6.0
Independent	Victor Morgan	56	5.2	+5.2
Majority		91	8.4	
Turnout		1,082	20.2	
Labour hold		Swing		

Little Stour and Ashtone By-Election 24 April 2008
Party	Candidate	Votes	%	±%
Conservative	Mike Conolly	1,109	66.0	−1.9
Liberal Democrats	Bryan Curtis	459	27.3	+5.4
Labour	John Bird	113	6.7	−3.5
Majority		650	38.7	
Turnout		1,681	31.2	
Conservative hold		Swing		

St Radigund's By-Election 30 October 2008
Party	Candidate	Votes	%	±%
Labour	Viv REVELL	244	32.7	
Conservative	Mandy Marie SEHMBI	219	29.4	
Liberal Democrats	Dean STILES	93	12.5	
Dover Alliance	Raymond John WHITE	86	11.5	
English Democrat	Tony OVENDEN	72	9.7	
UKIP	Vic MATCHAM	32	4.3	
Majority		25		
Turnout			20.86	
Labour gain from Independent		Swing		

Lydden and Temple Ewell By-Election 16 December 2010
Party	Candidate	Votes	%	±%
Conservative	Geoffrey LYMER	239	62.2	−5.3
Labour	Peter WALKER	90	23.4	+0.7
UKIP	Victor Peter MATCHAM	55	14.3	+4.7
Majority		149		
Turnout			20.3	
Conservative hold		Swing		

=== 2011-2015 ===
Maxton, Elms Vale and Priory By-Election 2 May 2013
Party	Candidate	Votes	%	±%
Labour	Peter Michael WALLACE	744	53.7	+3.5
Conservative	Deborah Nicholson BOULARES	642	46.3	−3.5
Majority		102		
Turnout			26.58	
Labour hold		Swing		

=== 2015-2019 ===
Aylesham By-Election 22 December 2016
Party	Candidate	Votes	%	±%
Labour	Gordon Cowan	460	61.9	−6.5
Conservative	Pauline Catterall	283	38.1	+38.1
Majority		177	23.8	
Turnout		743		
Labour hold		Swing		

Buckland By-Election 4 May 2017
Party	Candidate	Votes	%	±%
Labour	Nathaniel Richards	573	43.1	+2.6
Conservative	Callum Warriner	566	42.5	+13.6
UKIP	Timothy Turner	192	14.4	−16.2
Majority		7	0.5	
Turnout		1,331		
Labour hold		Swing		

Maxton, Elms Vale and Priory By-Election 4 May 2017
Party	Candidate	Votes	%	±%
Labour	Ann Napier	647	43.6	+7.5
Conservative	Roger Walkden	567	38.2	+8.0
UKIP	Peter McDermott	159	10.7	−22.9
Independent	Graham Wanstall	110	7.4	+7.4
Majority		80	5.4	
Turnout		1,483		
Labour gain from UKIP		Swing		

St Margaret's-at-Cliffe By-Election 23 November 2017
Party	Candidate	Votes	%	±%
Conservative	Peter Jull	750	70.5	+17.7
Labour	Charles Woodgate	314	29.5	+7.6
Majority		436	41.0	
Turnout		1,064		
Conservative hold		Swing		

=== 2019-2023 ===
Guston, Kingsdown and St Margaret's-at-Cliffe By-Election 12 December 2019
Party	Candidate	Votes	%	±%
Conservative	Martin Bates	2,523	59.1	+16.5
Labour	Eileen Rowbotham	902	21.1	+5.3
Green	Sarah White-Gleave	461	10.8	−8.7
Liberal Democrats	Roben Franklin	382	9.0	+9.0
Majority		1,621	38.0	
Turnout		4,268		
Conservative hold		Swing		

Mill Hill By-Election 6 May 2021
Party	Candidate	Votes	%	±%
Conservative	David Hawkes	716	40.3	+10.0
Labour	Jeffrey Loffman	608	34.2	−6.4
Green	Mike Eddy	292	16.4	−12.7
Independent	Chris Tough	103	5.8	+5.8
Liberal Democrats	Rick Blackwell	59	3.3	+3.3
Majority		108	6.1	
Turnout		1,778		
Conservative gain from Labour		Swing		

Sandwich By-Election 19 August 2021
Party	Candidate	Votes	%	±%
Conservative	Dan Friend	721	51.6	+17.3
Liberal Democrats	Anne Fox	676	48.4	+34.0
Majority		45	3.2	
Turnout		1,397		
Conservative hold		Swing		

=== 2023-2027 ===
Guston, Kingsdown and St Margaret's-at-Cliffe By-Election 27 August 2026
Party	Candidate	Votes	%	±%
Green	Ingrid Dodd	767	28.8	+18.0
Reform	James Defriend	733	27.5	N/A
Conservative	David Hawkes	456	17.1	−42.0
Labour	Steve Wisbey	389	14.6	−6.5
Restore	Jez Hermer	284	10.7	N/A
Independent	Graham Wanstall	35	1.3	N/A
Majority		34	1.3	
Turnout		2,664		
Green gain from Conservative		Swing		
