= 2011 Dover District Council election =

2011 UK local government election

| ← 2007 | 5 May 2011 | 2015 → |

All 45 seats on Dover District Council 23 seats needed for a majority
| | First party | Second party |
|---|---|---|
| Party | Conservative | Labour |
| Last election | 28 | 15 |
| Seats won | 26 | 19 |
| Seat change | ▼2 | ▲4 |
| Popular vote | 18,498 | 14,118 |
| Percentage | 49.0% | 37.4% |
Council control before election
No overall control
Council control after election
Conservative Party

Elections to Dover District Council in Kent, England were held on 5 May 2011. The whole council was up for election. The previous election for the District Council was held in May 2007.

== Election result ==
The Conservatives retained overall control, albeit with a reduced majority. Labour captured four seats from the Conservatives, who themselves took two from the Liberal Democrats, eliminating the latter from the council. Although Labour had recovered some seats, they did not restore their position as before the previous election in 2007.

Dover District Election Result 2011
| Party | Seats | Gains | Losses | Net gain/loss | Seats % | Votes % | Votes | +/− |
|---|---|---|---|---|---|---|---|---|
| Conservative | 26 | 2 | 4 | -2 | 57.8 | 49.0 | 18,498 | |
| Labour | 19 | 4 | - | +4 | 42.2 | 37.4 | 14,118 | |
| Liberal Democrats | 0 | - | 2 | -2 | 0.0 | 6.6 | 2,498 | |
| Independent | 0 | - | - | 0 | 0.0 | 1.23 | 1006 | |
| Dover Alliance | 0 | - | - | 0 | 0.0 | 1.7 | 645 | |
| Independents Party of Dover District | 0 | - | - | 0 | 0.0 | 1.3 | 503 | |
| | 0 | - | - | 0 | 0.0 | 0.38 | 310 | |
| TUSC | 0 | - | - | 0 | 0.0 | 0.50 | 197 | |

Seat gains/losses are in relation to the previous whole council election in 2007.

== Ward results ==
Only Labour offered candidates in all wards (but not all seats); the Conservatives left the field clear for an independent to oppose Labour in Town and Pier (unsuccessfully). The Liberal Democrats stood in only five wards (ten in 2007), nowhere being particularly popular in terms of votes except in the ward where they lost their only two seats. Unusually, UKIP did not put forward any candidates. There were several independent or local interest candidates.

Successful candidates are in bold; defending incumbents are indicated by "*". Percentages are of the total number of votes cast (In multiple member wards, each voter may vote for each vacancy, i.e., in a three-member ward each voter has three votes).

Aylesham (2 seats)
| Party | Candidate | Votes | % | ±% |
|---|---|---|---|---|
| Labour | **Robert John THOMPSON** | 1,077 | 39.95 | |
| Labour | **Linda Anne KEEN*** | 975 | 36.16 | |
| Conservative | David Roger LLOYD-JONES | 341 | 12.65 | |
| Conservative | Christopher ROOK | 303 | 11.24 | |
| Majority | | 634 | 23.52 | |
| Turnout | | 2,696 | 41.13 | |
| Labour **hold** | | Swing | | |
| Labour **hold** | | Swing | | |

Buckland (3 seats)
| Party | Candidate | Votes | % | ±% |
|---|---|---|---|---|
| Labour | **Janet Frances TRANTER*** | 781 | 18.26 | |
| Labour | **Anne Rose SMITH*** | 746 | 17.44 | |
| Labour | **John Micheal SMITH*** | 746 | 17.44 | |
| Conservative | John MORGAN | 490 | 11.45 | |
| Conservative | Ann Corke | 475 | 11.10 | |
| Conservative | Brian John ROWLAND | 452 | 10.57 | |
| Dover Alliance | Neil Thomas RIX | 391 | 9.14 | |
| TUSC | Peter Charles MCHUGH | 197 | 4.60 | |
| Majority | | 256 | 5.98 | |
| Turnout | | 4278 | 30.90 | |
| Labour **hold** | | Swing | | |
| Labour **hold** | | Swing | | |
| Labour **hold** | | Swing | | |

Capel-Le-Ferne (1 seat)
| Party | Candidate | Votes | % | ±% |
|---|---|---|---|---|
| Conservative | **Frederick John William SCALES*** | 656 | 71.38 | |
| Labour | John David BROOKS | 263 | 28.62 | |
| Majority | | 393 | 42.76 | |
| Turnout | | 919 | 48.47 | |
| Conservative **hold** | | Swing | | |

Castle (1 seat)
| Party | Candidate | Votes | % | ±% |
|---|---|---|---|---|
| Conservative | **Nigel John COLLOR*** | 440 | 54.79 | |
| Independent | Graham Richard WANSTALL | 186 | 23.16 | |
| Labour | Elizabeth Mary BIRD | 177 | 22.04 | |
| Majority | | 254 | 31.63 | |
| Turnout | | 803 | 45.12 | |
| Conservative **hold** | | Swing | | |

Eastry (2 seats)
| Party | Candidate | Votes | % | ±% |
|---|---|---|---|---|
| Conservative | **Nicholas Stephen KENTON*** | 1,184 | 33.67 | |
| Conservative | **Stephen Charles MANION*** | 1,062 | 30.20 | |
| Labour | Eileen Diane ROWBOTHAM | 643 | 18.28 | |
| Labour | James REES | 628 | 17.86 | |
| Majority | | 419 | 11.91 | |
| Turnout | | 3,517 | 49.17 | |
| Conservative **hold** | | Swing | | |
| Conservative **hold** | | Swing | | |

Eythorne and Shepherdswell (2 seats)
| Party | Candidate | Votes | % | ±% |
|---|---|---|---|---|
| Conservative | **Marjorie Joyce OVENDEN** | 992 | 27.96 | |
| Labour | **Peter WALKER** | 781 | 22.01 | |
| Conservative | Jennifer Catherine RECORD* | 699 | 19.70 | |
| Labour | Christopher James David TOUGH | 573 | 16.15 | |
| Independents Party of Dover District | Reginald Victor HANSELL | 503 | 14.18 | |
| Majority | | 82 | 2.31 | |
| Turnout | | 3548 | 53.70 | |
| Conservative **hold** | | Swing | | |
| Labour **gain** from Conservative | | Swing | | |

Little Stour and Ashstone (3 seats)
| Party | Candidate | Votes | % | ±% |
|---|---|---|---|---|
| Conservative | **Susan Scott CHANDLER*** | 1,680 | 24.67 | |
| Conservative | **Trevor James BARTLETT*** | 1,665 | 24.45 | |
| Conservative | **Michael Daniel CONOLLY** | 1,490 | 21.88 | |
| Liberal Democrats | Russell James TIMPSON | 504 | 7.40 | |
| Labour | Janet Audrey BIRKETT | 420 | 6.17 | |
| Labour | Kathleen BLACKBURN | 409 | 6.01 | |
| Labour | Brynley HAWKINS | 372 | 5.46 | |
| Liberal Democrats | Janet Anita Florence HILTON | 269 | 3.95 | |
| Majority | | 986 | 14.48 | |
| Turnout | | 6,809 | 48.30 | |
| Conservative **hold** | | Swing | | |
| Conservative **hold** | | Swing | | |
| Conservative **hold** | | Swing | | |

Lydden and Temple Ewell (1 seat)
| Party | Candidate | Votes | % | ±% |
|---|---|---|---|---|
| Conservative | **Geoffrey LYMER** | 451 | 65.55 | |
| Labour | John Phillip HASTE | 237 | 34.45 | |
| | Kevin James ELKS | 230 | 33.43 | |
| Majority | | 214 | 31.10 | |
| Turnout | | 688 | 48.45 | |
| Conservative **hold** | | Swing | | |

Maxton, Elms Vale and Priory (3 seats)
| Party | Candidate | Votes | % | ±% |
|---|---|---|---|---|
| Labour | **Susan Jane JONES** | 988 | 33.53 | |
| Conservative | **Roger Stephen WALKDEN*** | 980 | 33.25 | |
| Labour | **Diane Gloria SMALLWOOD** | 979 | 33.22 | |
| Labour | Viviane Jane REVELL | 945 | 32.07 | |
| Conservative | Mark Roy HEMINGWAY | 944 | 32.03 | |
| Conservative | Patrick George SHERRATT | 900 | 30.54 | |
| Majority | | 34 | 1.15 | |
| Turnout | | 2947 | 38.36 | |
| Labour **hold** | | Swing | | |
| Conservative **hold** | | Swing | | |
| Labour **hold** | | Swing | | |

Middle Deal and Sholden (3 seats)
| Party | Candidate | Votes | % | ±% |
|---|---|---|---|---|
| Labour | **Pamela Joyce HAWKINS** | 1,330 | 17.17 | |
| Labour | **James Anthony CRONK** | 1,222 | 15.78 | |
| Conservative | **Trevor Antony BOND*** | 1,197 | 15.45 | |
| Conservative | Adrian FRIEND* | 1,189 | 15.35 | |
| Labour | Martin Huw GARSIDE | 1,151 | 14.86 | |
| Conservative | Robert Charles JENNINGS | 1,138 | 14.69 | |
| Independent | Paul John ROBBINS | 519 | 6.70 | |
| Majority | | 8 | 0.10 | |
| Turnout | | 7,746 | 48.72 | |
| Labour **gain** from Conservative | | Swing | | |
| Labour **gain** from Conservative | | Swing | | |
| Conservative **hold** | | Swing | | |

Mill Hill (3 seats)
| Party | Candidate | Votes | % | ±% |
|---|---|---|---|---|
| Labour | **Benet Walter BANO*** | 1,318 | 21.38 | |
| Labour | **Michael Robert EDDY*** | 1,315 | 21.33 | |
| Labour | **Anthony Sidney POLLITT** | 1,251 | 20.30 | |
| Conservative | | | | |
| Conservative | John BATTLES | 737 | 11.96 | |
| Conservative | Wayne Edward ELLIOTT | 695 | 11.28 | |
| Liberal Democrats | John Charles TRICKEY | 463 | 7.51 | |
| Liberal Democrats | Janet BENNETT | 385 | 6.25 | |
| Majority | | 514 | 8.34 | |
| Turnout | | 6,164 | 41.86 | |
| Labour **hold** | | Swing | | |
| Labour **hold** | | Swing | | |
| Labour **hold** | | Swing | | |

North Deal (3 seats)
| Party | Candidate | Votes | % | ±% |
|---|---|---|---|---|
| Conservative | **Julie Ann ROOK*** | 1,239 | 17.02 | |
| Conservative | **Robert James FROST** | 1,163 | 15.98 | |
| Labour | **William Christopher GARDNER** | 1,124 | 15.44 | |
| Labour | Bryan HENDERSON | 1,097 | 15.07 | |
| Conservative | Peter David JULL | 1,085 | 14.91 | |
| Labour | Albert Morris TAYLORSON | 1,025 | 14.08 | |
| Liberal Democrats | Antony James HOOK | 273 | 3.75 | |
| Liberal Democrats | Linda Anne HOOK | 273 | 3.75 | |
| Majority | | 27 | 0.37 | |
| Turnout | | 7,279 | 47.33 | |
| Conservative **hold** | | Swing | | |
| Conservative **hold** | | Swing | | |
| Labour **gain** from Conservative | | Swing | | |

Ringwould (1 seat)
| Party | Candidate | Votes | % | ±% |
|---|---|---|---|---|
| Conservative | **Suzanne Marie LE CHEVALIER** | 625 | 65.86 | |
| Labour | David Malcolm ROBERTSON | 324 | 34.14 | |
| Majority | | 301 | 31.72 | |
| Turnout | | 949 | 56.84 | |
| Conservative **hold** | | Swing | | |

River (2 seats)
| Party | Candidate | Votes | % | ±% |
|---|---|---|---|---|
| Conservative | **Sylvia Ruth NICHOLAS** | 1,175 | 33.06 | |
| Conservative | **Pauline Margaret BERESFORD** | 1,108 | 31.18 | |
| Labour | Jean NEWMAN | 517 | 14.55 | |
| Labour | William Victor NEWMAN | 453 | 12.75 | |
| Independent | John Gordon KILLIP | 301 | 8.47 | |
| Majority | | 591 | 16.63 | |
| Turnout | | 3,554 | 52.50 | |
| Conservative **hold** | | Swing | | |
| Conservative **hold** | | Swing | | |

Sandwich (3 seats)
| Party | Candidate | Votes | % | ±% |
|---|---|---|---|---|
| Conservative | **Bernard William BUTCHER*** | 1,591 | 22.53 | |
| Conservative | **Paul Ivor CARTER** | 1,505 | 21.31 | |
| Conservative | **Margaret Ann RUSSELL** | 1,217 | 17.23 | |
| Labour | Terence James BIRKETT | 634 | 8.98 | |
| Labour | Elizabeth Shaw SEALY | 612 | 8.67 | |
| Liberal Democrats | Michael Peter Tacon HART | 604 | 8.55 | |
| Labour | Carol Jayne ERRINGTON | 573 | 8.11 | |
| Liberal Democrats | Sarah SMITH | 326 | 4.62 | |
| Majority | | 583 | 8.26 | |
| Turnout | | 7,062 | | |
| Conservative **hold** | | Swing | | |
| Conservative **hold** | | Swing | | |
| Conservative **hold** | | Swing | | |

St Margaret`s-At-Cliffe (2 seats)
| Party | Candidate | Votes | % | ±% |
|---|---|---|---|---|
| Conservative | **Keith Evans MORRIS** | 1,257 | 36.87 | |
| Conservative | **Paul Alexander** | 1,185 | 34.76 | |
| Labour | John William BIRD | 500 | 14.67 | |
| Labour | Thomas James BIRD | 467 | 13.70 | |
| Majority | | 685 | 20.09 | |
| Turnout | | 3,409 | 53.18 | |
| Conservative **hold** | | Swing | | |
| Conservative **hold** | | Swing | | |

St Radigund`s (2 seats)
| Party | Candidate | Votes | % | ±% |
|---|---|---|---|---|
| Labour | **Kevin MILLS*** | 545 | 26.99 | |
| Labour | **Gordon COWAN*** | 525 | 26.00 | |
| Conservative | Deborah Nicholson BOULARES | 475 | 23.53 | |
| Conservative | Stewart Andrew DIMMOCK | 474 | 23.48 | |
| Majority | | 50 | 2.48 | |
| Turnout | | 2019 | 30.60 | |
| Labour **hold** | | Swing | | |
| Labour **hold** | | Swing | | |

Tower Hamlets (2 seats)
| Party | Candidate | Votes | % | ±% |
|---|---|---|---|---|
| Labour | **John Howard GOODWIN*** | 760 | 34.77 | |
| Labour | **Pamela Mary BRIVIO** | 750 | 34.31 | |
| Conservative | Bryan Richard COPE | 377 | 17.25 | |
| Conservative | Kathleen Sally LE-FAYE | 299 | 13.68 | |
| Majority | | 373 | 17.06 | |
| Turnout | | 2186 | 31.37 | |
| Labour **hold** | | Swing | | |
| Labour **hold** | | Swing | | |

Town and Pier (1 seat)
| Party | Candidate | Votes | % | ±% |
|---|---|---|---|---|
| Labour | **George James HOOD*** | 324 | 56.06 | |
| Dover Alliance | Christopher John PRECIOUS | 254 | 43.94 | |
| Majority | | 70 | 12.11 | |
| Turnout | | 578 | 40.03 | |
| Labour **hold** | | Swing | | |

Walmer (3 seats)
| Party | Candidate | Votes | % | ±% |
|---|---|---|---|---|
| Conservative | **Patrick Glyn HEATH*** | 1,764 | 21.71 | |
| Conservative | **Christopher James SMITH*** | 1,690 | 20.80 | |
| Conservative | **Paul Stephen LE CHEVALIER*** | 1,624 | 19.99 | |
| Labour | George Stanley BROWN | 1,056 | 13.00 | |
| Labour | Ernest Samuel BRIMMELL | 1,014 | 12.48 | |
| Labour | Benjamin Rupert COSIN | 978 | 12.04 | |
| Majority | | 568 | | 6.99 |
| Turnout | | 8,126 | 48.94 | |
| Conservative **hold** | | Swing | | |
| Conservative **hold** | | Swing | | |
| Conservative **hold** | | Swing | | |

Whitfield (2 seats)
| Party | Candidate | Votes | % | ±% |
|---|---|---|---|---|
| Conservative | **David HANNENT** | 847 | 23.94 | |
| Conservative | **James Stephen BACK** | 831 | 23.49 | |
| Liberal Democrats | Clive John MEREDITH* | 654 | 18.49 | |
| Liberal Democrats | Bryan Arthur Charles CURTIS | 520 | 14.70 | |
| Labour | Margaret Irene COSIN | 319 | 9.02 | |
| Labour | Angela Florence REES | 287 | 8.11 | |
| | Victor Peter MATCHAM | 80 | 2.26 | |
| Majority | | 177 | 5.00 | |
| Turnout | | 3538 | 48.98 | |
| Conservative **gain** from Liberal Democrats | | Swing | | |
| Conservative **gain** from Liberal Democrats | | Swing | | |
