= 2019 Dover District Council election =

2019 UK local government election

- 2 May 2019

All 32 seats on Dover District Council 17 seats needed for a majority
| | First party | Second party | Third party |
|---|---|---|---|
| Party | Conservative | Labour | Independent |
| Last election | 18 | 13 | 0 |
| Seats won | 19 | 12 | 1 |
| Seat change | ▲1 | ▼1 | ▲1 |
Council control before election
Conservative Party
Council control after election
Conservative Party

The 2019 Dover District Council election took place on 2 May 2019 to elect members of the Dover District Council in Kent, England. It was held on the same day as other local elections. It was the first election to be held after boundary changes reduced the number of seats from 45 to 32. The Conservative Party retained overall control of the council.

== Summary ==
=== Election result ===
2019 Dover District Council election
| Party | Candidates | Seats | Gains | Losses | Net gain/loss | Seats % | Votes % | Votes | +/− |
|---|---|---|---|---|---|---|---|---|---|
| Conservative | 31 | 19 | N/A | N/A | ▼6 | 59.4 | 43.7 | 21,584 | +1.2 |
| Labour | 29 | 12 | N/A | N/A | ▼5 | 37.5 | 29.0 | 14,345 | –3.9 |
| Independent | 6 | 1 | N/A | N/A | ▲1 | 3.1 | 5.6 | 2,755 | +5.1 |
| Green | 13 | 0 | N/A | N/A | Steady | 0.0 | 11.5 | 5,673 | +10.6 |
| Liberal Democrats | 12 | 0 | N/A | N/A | Steady | 0.0 | 8.0 | 3,944 | +2.2 |
| Our Nation | 4 | 0 | N/A | N/A | Steady | 0.0 | 1.5 | 721 | N/A |
| Renew | 1 | 0 | N/A | N/A | Steady | 0.0 | 0.8 | 389 | N/A |

== Ward results ==
=== Alkham and Capel-le-Ferne ===
Alkham and Capel-le-Ferne
| Party | Candidate | Votes | % | ±% |
|---|---|---|---|---|
| Conservative | James Rose | 455 | 52.1 | |
| Liberal Democrats | Aston Mannerings | 317 | 36.3 | |
| Labour | Susan Carlyle | 101 | 11.6 | |
| Majority | | 138 | 15.8 | |
| Turnout | | 896 | 33.71 | |
| Rejected ballots | | 23 | 2.6 | |
| Registered electors | | 2,658 | | |
| Conservative win (new seat) | | | | |

=== Aylesham, Eythorne and Shepherdswell ===
Aylesham, Eythorne and Shepherdswell (3 seats)
| Party | Candidate | Votes | % | ±% |
|---|---|---|---|---|
| Labour | Linda Keen | 997 | 39.9 | |
| Labour | Charles Woodgate | 915 | 36.6 | |
| Independent | Peter Walker | 914 | 36.6 | |
| Conservative | Marjorie Ovenden | 908 | 36.3 | |
| Labour | Gordon Cowan | 872 | 34.9 | |
| Conservative | Martin Bates | 786 | 31.4 | |
| Liberal Democrats | Annabel Stogdon | 450 | 18.0 | |
| Majority | | 6 | 0.2 | |
| Turnout | | 2,531 | 31.05 | |
| Rejected ballots | | 31 | 1.2 | |
| Registered electors | | 8,151 | | |
| Labour win (new seat) | | | | |
| Labour win (new seat) | | | | |
| Independent win (new seat) | | | | |

=== Buckland ===
Buckland (2 seats)
| Party | Candidate | Votes | % | ±% |
|---|---|---|---|---|
| Labour | Kevin Mills | 504 | 41.1 | |
| Labour | Charlotte Zosseder | 463 | 37.8 | |
| Conservative | John Morgan | 387 | 31.6 | |
| Conservative | Brian Rowland | 334 | 27.3 | |
| Our Nation | Graham Lane | 297 | 24.2 | |
| Independent | Neil Rix | 229 | 18.7 | |
| Majority | | 76 | 6.2 | |
| Turnout | | 1,249 | 23.22 | |
| Rejected ballots | | 24 | 1.9 | |
| Registered electors | | 5,380 | | |
| Labour win (new seat) | | | | |
| Labour win (new seat) | | | | |

=== Dover Downs and River ===
Dover Downs and River (2 seats)
| Party | Candidate | Votes | % | ±% |
|---|---|---|---|---|
| Conservative | David Beaney | 902 | 50.0 | |
| Conservative | Mark Rose | 850 | 47.1 | |
| Liberal Democrats | Penelope James | 490 | 27.2 | |
| Labour | Lesley Stephenson | 476 | 26.4 | |
| Liberal Democrats | Stephen Green | 411 | 22.8 | |
| Majority | | 360 | 20.0 | |
| Turnout | | 1,869 | 35.06 | |
| Rejected ballots | | 66 | 3.5 | |
| Registered electors | | 5,331 | | |
| Conservative win (new seat) | | | | |
| Conservative win (new seat) | | | | |

=== Eastry Rural ===
Eastry Rural (2 seats)
| Party | Candidate | Votes | % | ±% |
|---|---|---|---|---|
| Conservative | Nicholas Kenton | 800 | 47.5 | |
| Conservative | Stephen Manion | 764 | 45.4 | |
| Green | Simon Phillips | 759 | 45.1 | |
| Labour | Angela Ray | 519 | 30.8 | |
| Majority | | 5 | 0.3 | |
| Turnout | | 1,712 | 34.92 | |
| Rejected ballots | | 28 | 1.6 | |
| Registered electors | | 4,903 | | |
| Conservative win (new seat) | | | | |
| Conservative win (new seat) | | | | |

=== Guston, Kingsdown and St. Margaret's-at-Cliffe ===
Guston, Kingsdown and St. Margaret's-at-Cliffe (2 seats)
| Party | Candidate | Votes | % | ±% |
|---|---|---|---|---|
| Conservative | Keith Morris | 1,159 | 52.1 | |
| Conservative | Oliver Richardson | 938 | 42.1 | |
| Green | Nicolas Shread | 531 | 23.9 | |
| Labour | Margaret Cosin | 431 | 19.4 | |
| Renew | Stephen Wisbey | 389 | 17.5 | |
| Labour | Jeffrey Loffman | 340 | 15.3 | |
| Independent | Peter Powell | 211 | 9.5 | |
| Majority | | 407 | 18.3 | |
| Turnout | | 2,248 | 39.14 | |
| Rejected ballots | | 22 | 1.0 | |
| Registered electors | | 5,743 | | |
| Conservative win (new seat) | | | | |
| Conservative win (new seat) | | | | |

=== Little Stour and Ashstone ===
Little Stour and Ashstone (2 seats)
| Party | Candidate | Votes | % | ±% |
|---|---|---|---|---|
| Conservative | Trevor Bartlett | 1,207 | 57.9 | |
| Conservative | Michael Conolly | 1,123 | 53.9 | |
| Green | Fiona Mason | 548 | 26.3 | |
| Liberal Democrats | Luke Lyden | 331 | 15.9 | |
| Liberal Democrats | Nigel Whitburn | 323 | 15.5 | |
| Labour | Anthony Pollitt | 284 | 13.6 | |
| Majority | | 575 | 27.6 | |
| Turnout | | 2,123 | 37.54 | |
| Rejected ballots | | 38 | 1.8 | |
| Registered electors | | 5,655 | | |
| Conservative win (new seat) | | | | |
| Conservative win (new seat) | | | | |

=== Maxton and Elms Vale ===
Maxton and Elms Vale
| Party | Candidate | Votes | % | ±% |
|---|---|---|---|---|
| Conservative | Roger Walkden | 373 | 44.7 | |
| Labour | Ann Napier | 339 | 40.6 | |
| Liberal Democrats | Caroline Howden | 122 | 14.6 | |
| Majority | | 34 | 4.1 | |
| Turnout | | 861 | 29.14 | |
| Rejected ballots | | 27 | 3.1 | |
| Registered electors | | 2,955 | | |
| Conservative win (new seat) | | | | |

=== Middle Deal ===
Middle Deal (2 seats)
| Party | Candidate | Votes | % | ±% |
|---|---|---|---|---|
| Conservative | Trevor Bond | 660 | 39.2 | |
| Labour | David Cronk | 620 | 36.9 | |
| Conservative | David Hawkes | 553 | 32.9 | |
| Labour | Eileen Rowbotham | 536 | 31.9 | |
| Green | Anne Farrington | 414 | 24.6 | |
| Liberal Democrats | Bernadette Gosling | 181 | 10.8 | |
| Our Nation | Stephen Conner | 157 | 9.3 | |
| Majority | | 67 | 4.0 | |
| Turnout | | 1,707 | 30.45 | |
| Rejected ballots | | 25 | 1.5 | |
| Registered electors | | 5,605 | | |
| Conservative win (new seat) | | | | |
| Labour win (new seat) | | | | |

=== Mill Hill ===
Mill Hill (2 seats)
| Party | Candidate | Votes | % | ±% |
|---|---|---|---|---|
| Labour | Joseph Burman | 709 | 40.1 | |
| Labour | Helen Williams | 664 | 37.5 | |
| Conservative | Derek Bond | 530 | 30.0 | |
| Green | Michael Eddy | 509 | 28.8 | |
| Conservative | Keith Lee | 466 | 26.3 | |
| Green | Christine Oliver | 446 | 25.2 | |
| Majority | | 134 | 7.6 | |
| Turnout | | 1,816 | 30.08 | |
| Rejected ballots | | 47 | 2.6 | |
| Registered electors | | 6,038 | | |
| Labour win (new seat) | | | | |
| Labour win (new seat) | | | | |

=== North Deal ===
North Deal (2 seats)
| Party | Candidate | Votes | % | ±% |
|---|---|---|---|---|
| Labour | Susan Beer | 891 | 42.4 | |
| Conservative | Peter Jull | 825 | 39.2 | |
| Conservative | Daniel Friend | 802 | 38.2 | |
| Labour | William Gardner | 790 | 37.6 | |
| Liberal Democrats | Linda Hook | 490 | 23.3 | |
| Majority | | 23 | 1.1 | |
| Turnout | | 2,178 | 37.24 | |
| Rejected ballots | | 76 | 3.5 | |
| Registered electors | | 5,849 | | |
| Labour win (new seat) | | | | |
| Conservative win (new seat) | | | | |

=== Sandwich ===
Sandwich (2 seats)
| Party | Candidate | Votes | % | ±% |
|---|---|---|---|---|
| Conservative | Michael Holloway | 883 | 42.8 | |
| Conservative | Susan Chandler | 872 | 42.3 | |
| Independent | Paul Carter | 639 | 31.0 | |
| Liberal Democrats | Anne Fox | 371 | 18.0 | |
| Labour | Benet Bano | 351 | 17.0 | |
| Green | Peter Cutler | 328 | 15.9 | |
| Labour | David Wood | 314 | 15.2 | |
| Majority | | 233 | 11.3 | |
| Turnout | | 2,086 | 40.31 | |
| Rejected ballots | | 23 | 1.1 | |
| Registered electors | | 5,175 | | |
| Conservative win (new seat) | | | | |
| Conservative win (new seat) | | | | |

=== St. Radigund's ===
St. Radigund's (2 seats)
| Party | Candidate | Votes | % | ±% |
|---|---|---|---|---|
| Labour | Susan Jones | 425 | 42.8 | |
| Labour | John Haste | 319 | 32.2 | |
| Green | Jacqueline Garnett | 273 | 27.5 | |
| Conservative | Andy Calder | 271 | 27.3 | |
| Conservative | Callum Warriner | 242 | 24.4 | |
| Our Nation | Amanda Heafey | 157 | 15.8 | |
| Majority | | 46 | 4.6 | |
| Turnout | | 1,014 | 22.37 | |
| Rejected ballots | | 22 | 2.2 | |
| Registered electors | | 4,532 | | |
| Labour win (new seat) | | | | |
| Labour win (new seat) | | | | |

=== Tower Hamlets ===
Tower Hamlets
| Party | Candidate | Votes | % | ±% |
|---|---|---|---|---|
| Labour Co-op | Pamela Brivio | 307 | 47.2 | +13.9 |
| Conservative | Ann Jenner | 133 | 20.5 | −2.4 |
| Our Nation | Ben Glayzer | 110 | 16.9 | New |
| Green | Brian Murphy | 100 | 15.4 | +4.3 |
| Majority | | 174 | 26.8 | |
| Turnout | | 667 | 23.92 | |
| Rejected ballots | | 16 | 2.4 | |
| Registered electors | | 2,788 | | |
| Labour Co-op win (new seat) | | | | |

=== Town and Castle ===
Town and Castle (2 seats)
| Party | Candidate | Votes | % | ±% |
|---|---|---|---|---|
| Conservative | David Hannent | 458 | 30.3 | |
| Labour | Edward Biggs | 425 | 28.1 | |
| Conservative | Richard Jeacock | 407 | 26.9 | |
| Independent | Graham Wanstall | 395 | 26.1 | |
| Independent | Christopher Precious | 367 | 24.3 | |
| Labour | Miriam Wood | 347 | 22.9 | |
| Green | Rebecca Sawbridge | 312 | 20.6 | |
| Majority | | 18 | 1.2 | |
| Turnout | | 1,548 | 26.93 | |
| Rejected ballots | | 35 | 2.3 | |
| Registered electors | | 5,748 | | |
| Conservative win (new seat) | | | | |
| Labour win (new seat) | | | | |

=== Walmer ===
Walmer (2 seats)
| Party | Candidate | Votes | % | ±% |
|---|---|---|---|---|
| Conservative | Christopher Vinson | 1,062 | 46.2 | |
| Conservative | Derek Murphy | 956 | 41.5 | |
| Green | John Lonsdale | 621 | 27.0 | |
| Green | Daniel Symons | 604 | 26.2 | |
| Labour | Ruth Harris-Small | 444 | 19.3 | |
| Labour | Hilary Preidel | 408 | 17.7 | |
| Liberal Democrats | James Caple | 234 | 10.2 | |
| Majority | | 335 | 14.6 | |
| Turnout | | 2,349 | 40.40 | |
| Rejected ballots | | 48 | 2.0 | |
| Registered electors | | 5,815 | | |
| Conservative win (new seat) | | | | |
| Conservative win (new seat) | | | | |

=== Whitfield ===
Whitfield (2 seats)
| Party | Candidate | Votes | % | ±% |
|---|---|---|---|---|
| Conservative | James Back | 775 | 56.4 | |
| Conservative | Nigel Collor | 703 | 51.2 | |
| Labour | Lee Kettlewell | 298 | 21.7 | |
| Labour | Roland Zosseder | 256 | 18.6 | |
| Green | Sarah Waite Gleave | 228 | 16.6 | |
| Liberal Democrats | Richard Beal | 224 | 16.3 | |
| Majority | | 405 | 29.5 | |
| Turnout | | 1,402 | 29.40 | |
| Rejected ballots | | 29 | 2.1 | |
| Registered electors | | 4,769 | | |
| Conservative win (new seat) | | | | |
| Conservative win (new seat) | | | | |

== Changes 2019–2023 ==
- In October 2019, Conservative council leader Keith Morris resigned as leader and as councillor for Guston, Kingsdown and St Margaret's-at-Cliffe. Trevor Bartlett was elected leader on 30 October 2019.
- In January 2023, Labour councillor John Haste (St Radigund's) died; his seat remained vacant until the 2023 election.

=== By-elections ===
==== Guston, Kingsdown and St Margaret's-at-Cliffe ====
The Guston, Kingsdown and St Margaret's-at-Cliffe by-election was triggered by the resignation of Conservative councillor Keith Morris, who also stood down as leader of the council.

Guston, Kingsdown and St Margaret's-at-Cliffe by-election, 12 December 2019
| Party | Candidate | Votes | % | ±% |
|---|---|---|---|---|
| Conservative | Martin Bates | 2,523 | 59.1 | +16.5 |
| Labour | Eileen Rowbotham | 902 | 21.1 | +5.3 |
| Green | Sarah Waite-Gleave | 461 | 10.8 | –8.7 |
| Liberal Democrats | Roben Franklin | 382 | 9.0 | N/A |
| Majority | | 1,621 | 38.0 | N/A |
| Turnout | | 4,291 | 72.19 | |
| Rejected ballots | | 23 | 0.5 | |
| Registered electors | | 5,944 | | |
| Conservative hold | | Swing | ▲5.6 | |

==== Mill Hill ====
The Mill Hill by-election was called following the resignation of Labour councillor Joseph Burman in 2020.

Mill Hill by-election, 6 May 2021
| Party | Candidate | Votes | % | ±% |
|---|---|---|---|---|
| Conservative | David Hawkes | 716 | 40.3 | +10.3 |
| Labour | Jeffrey Loffman | 608 | 34.2 | −5.9 |
| Green | Michael Eddy | 292 | 16.4 | −12.4 |
| Independent | Christopher Tough | 103 | 5.8 | N/A |
| Liberal Democrats | Richard Blackwell | 59 | 3.3 | N/A |
| Majority | | 108 | 6.1 | |
| Turnout | | 1,797 | 30.29 | |
| Rejected ballots | | 19 | 1.1 | |
| Registered electors | | 5,933 | | |
| Conservative gain from Labour | | Swing | | |

==== Alkham and Capel-le-Ferne ====
The Alkham and Capel-le-Ferne by-election was triggered by the resignation of Conservative councillor James Rose.

Alkham and Capel-le-Ferne by-election, 22 July 2021
| Party | Candidate | Votes | % | ±% |
|---|---|---|---|---|
| Conservative | Martin Hibbert | 315 | 48.7 | −3.4 |
| Liberal Democrats | Roben Franklin | 173 | 26.7 | −9.6 |
| Labour | Gordon Cowan | 101 | 15.6 | +4.0 |
| Green | Nicolas Shread | 58 | 9.0 | New |
| Majority | | 142 | 21.9 | |
| Turnout | | 651 | 24.72 | |
| Rejected ballots | | 4 | 0.6 | |
| Registered electors | | 2,634 | | |
| Conservative hold | | Swing | ▲3.1 | |

==== Sandwich ====
The Sandwich by-election followed the resignation of Conservative councillor Michael Holloway.

Sandwich by-election, 19 August 2021
| Party | Candidate | Votes | % | ±% |
|---|---|---|---|---|
| Conservative | Daniel Friend | 721 | 51.6 | +8.8 |
| Liberal Democrats | Anne Fox | 676 | 48.4 | +30.4 |
| Majority | | 45 | 3.2 | |
| Turnout | | 1,407 | 27.38 | |
| Rejected ballots | | 10 | 0.7 | |
| Registered electors | | 5,139 | | |
| Conservative hold | | Swing | | |
