= 2007 Dover District Council election =

2007 UK local government election

- 3 May 2007

All 45 seats on Dover District Council 23 seats needed for a majority
	First party	Second party	Third party
Party	Conservative	Labour	Liberal Democrats
Last election	22	20	3
Seats won	28	15	2
Seat change	▲6	▼5	▼1
Popular vote	15,601	9,945	4,274
Percentage	47.8%	31.3%	13.1%
Council control before election
No overall control
Council control after election
Conservative

Elections to Dover District Council in Kent, England were held on 3 May 2007, as were UK local elections across the country. The whole council was up for election and the Conservative Party gained overall control of the council.

== Results by Ward (A-Z) ==
Source:
