= 2015 Dover District Council election =

2015 UK local government election

- 7 May 2015

All 45 seats on Dover District Council 23 seats needed for a majority
	First party	Second party	Third party
Party	Conservative	Labour	UKIP
Last election	26	19	0
Seats won	25	17	3
Seat change	▼1	▼2	▲3
Popular vote	24,037	19,077	11,018
Percentage	40.6%	32.2%	18.6%
Council control before election
Conservative Party
Council control after election
Conservative Party

The 2015 Dover District Council election took place on 7 May 2015 to elect members of the Dover District Council in Kent, England. It was held on the same day as other local elections. The Conservative Party retained overall control of the council.
