= Stratford-on-Avon District Council elections =

Local government elections in Warwickshire, England

Stratford-on-Avon District Council elections are held every four years. Stratford-on-Avon District Council is the local authority for the non-metropolitan district of Stratford-on-Avon in Warwickshire, England. Since the last boundary changes in 2023, 41 councillors have been elected from 39 wards. Prior to 2015 elections were held three years out of every four, with a third of the council elected each time.

== Council elections ==
- 1973 Stratford-on-Avon District Council election
- 1976 Stratford-on-Avon District Council election
- 1979 Stratford-on-Avon District Council election (New ward boundaries)
- 1980 Stratford-on-Avon District Council election
- 1982 Stratford-on-Avon District Council election
- 1983 Stratford-on-Avon District Council election
- 1984 Stratford-on-Avon District Council election
- 1986 Stratford-on-Avon District Council election
- 1987 Stratford-on-Avon District Council election
- 1988 Stratford-on-Avon District Council election
- 1990 Stratford-on-Avon District Council election
- 1991 Stratford-on-Avon District Council election
- 1992 Stratford-on-Avon District Council election
- 1994 Stratford-on-Avon District Council election (District boundary changes took place but the number of seats remained the same)
- 1995 Stratford-on-Avon District Council election
- 1996 Stratford-on-Avon District Council election
- 1998 Stratford-on-Avon District Council election
- 1999 Stratford-on-Avon District Council election
- 2000 Stratford-on-Avon District Council election
- 2002 Stratford-on-Avon District Council election (New ward boundaries reduced the number of seats by 2)
- 2003 Stratford-on-Avon District Council election
- 2004 Stratford-on-Avon District Council election
- 2006 Stratford-on-Avon District Council election
- 2007 Stratford-on-Avon District Council election
- 2008 Stratford-on-Avon District Council election (Some new ward boundaries)
- 2010 Stratford-on-Avon District Council election
- 2011 Stratford-on-Avon District Council election
- 2012 Stratford-on-Avon District Council election
- 2014 Stratford-on-Avon District Council election
- 2015 Stratford-on-Avon District Council election (New ward boundaries)
- 2019 Stratford-on-Avon District Council election
- 2023 Stratford-on-Avon District Council election (New ward boundaries)

== District result maps ==
2002 results map

2003 results map

2004 results map

2006 results map

2007 results map

2008 results map

2010 results map

2011 results map

2012 results map

2014 results map

2015 results map

2019 results map

2023 results map

== By-election results ==
=== 1994-1998 ===
Tanworth By-Election 6 March 1997
Party	Candidate	Votes	%	±%
Conservative		277	67.7	
Liberal Democrats		132	32.4	
Majority		145	35.3	
Turnout		409	32.0	
Conservative hold		Swing		

Tanworth Earlswood By-Election 6 March 1997
Party	Candidate	Votes	%	±%
Independent		266	56.5	
Conservative		167	35.4	
Labour		38	8.0	
Majority		99	21.1	
Turnout		471	35.3	
Independent hold		Swing		

=== 1998-2002 ===
Tredington By-Election 22 October 1998
Party	Candidate	Votes	%	±%
Conservative		441	58.9	+7.3
Liberal Democrats		308	41.1	−7.3
Majority		133	17.8	
Turnout		749	37.0	
Conservative hold		Swing		

Elm By-Election 8 February 2001
Party	Candidate	Votes	%	±%
Liberal Democrats		306	67.3	
Independent		149	32.7	
Majority		157	34.6	
Turnout		455		
Liberal Democrats hold		Swing		

Bidford By-Election 13 September 2001
Party	Candidate	Votes	%	±%
Liberal Democrats	Darren Pemberton	449	48.4	+48.4
Conservative	Graham Getgood	405	43.7	−7.4
Labour	Michael Gerard	73	7.9	−3.7
Majority		44	4.7	
Turnout		927		
Liberal Democrats gain from Independent		Swing		

Compton By-Election 13 September 2001
Party	Candidate	Votes	%	±%
Conservative	Richard Adams	313	55.5	−10.8
Liberal Democrats	Virginia Mason	228	40.4	+6.7
Labour	Jacqueline Abbott	23	4.1	+4.1
Majority		85	15.1	
Turnout		564	40.2	
Conservative hold		Swing		

=== 2002-2006 ===
Vale of the Red Horse By-Election 19 September 2002
Party	Candidate	Votes	%	±%
Conservative	Gillian Roche	469	48.8	−23.9
Liberal Democrats		391	40.6	+13.3
Independent		73	7.6	+7.6
Green		29	3.0	+3.0
Majority		78	8.2	
Turnout		962	53.1	
Conservative hold		Swing		

Stratford Alveston By-Election 7 November 2002
Party	Candidate	Votes	%	±%
Liberal Democrats		727	48.6	+5.5
Conservative		489	32.7	−24.2
Independent		281	18.7	+18.7
Majority		238	15.9	
Turnout		1,497	35.3	
Liberal Democrats gain from Conservative		Swing		

Long Compton By-Election 5 May 2005
Party	Candidate	Votes	%	±%
Conservative	Stephen Gray	706	57.4	
Liberal Democrats	Virginia Mason	523	42.6	
Majority		283	14.8	
Turnout		1,229	73.2	
Conservative hold		Swing		

=== 2006-2010 ===
Wellesbourne By-Election 20 July 2006
Party	Candidate	Votes	%	±%
Conservative	Laura Main	897	47.2	
Liberal Democrats	Priscilla Cook	804	42.4	
Labour	John Ritchie	197	10.4	
Majority		93	4.8	
Turnout		1,898	35.9	
Conservative hold		Swing		

Alcester By-Election 24 August 2006
Party	Candidate	Votes	%	±%
Conservative	Susan Adams	798	53.5	+22.4
Liberal Democrats	Karyl Rees	638	42.8	−13.9
Labour	Matthew Stephens	54	3.6	−2.0
Majority		160	10.7	
Turnout		1,490	31.8	
Conservative gain from Liberal Democrats		Swing		

Kineton By-Election 2 November 2006
Party	Candidate	Votes	%	±%
Conservative	Susan Wixey	712	54.4	+13.3
Liberal Democrats	Sandra Knapton	598	45.6	−13.3
Majority		114	8.8	
Turnout		1,310	39.4	
Conservative gain from Liberal Democrats		Swing		

Stratford Alveston By-Election 28 November 2009
Party	Candidate	Votes	%	±%
Liberal Democrats	Anthony Cronin	888	47.0	−2.1
Conservative	Lynda Organ	834	44.1	+1.8
Labour	David Talbot	111	5.9	+5.9
Green	Hugh Chatwin	58	3.1	+3.1
Majority		54	2.9	
Turnout		1,891	31.2	
Liberal Democrats gain from Conservative		Swing		

=== 2011-2015 ===
Shipston by-election 29 November 2012
Party	Candidate	Votes	%	±%
Labour	Jeffrey Kenner	613	37.9	+9.1
Liberal Democrats	Laura Nelson	575	35.5	−7.8
Conservative	Marion Lowe	431	26.6	+2.2
Majority		38	2.3	
Turnout		1,619		
Labour gain from Conservative		Swing		

Southam by-election 19 June 2014
Party	Candidate	Votes	%	±%
Conservative	Tony Bromwich	493	42.9	+2.0
Labour	Bransby Thomas	398	34.6	+11.7
UKIP	Emily Bleloch	259	22.5	−7.0
Majority		95	8.3	
Turnout		1,150		
Conservative hold		Swing		

=== 2015-2019 ===
Studley with Sambourne by-election 25 February 2016
Party	Candidate	Votes	%	±%
Liberal Democrats	Hazel Wright	632	55.3	+24.1
Conservative	Paul Beaman	233	20.4	−12.2
Labour	Karen Somner-Brown	156	13.7	+4.5
Independent	Nick Moon	66	5.8	N/A
UKIP	Nigel Rogers	55	4.8	−5.5
Majority		376	34.9	
Turnout			39.5	
Liberal Democrats gain from Conservative		Swing		

The by-election was caused by the resignation of Councillor Nick Moon, who was elected as a Conservative. However, Moon changed his mind and contested the election as an independent, receiving 5.8% of the vote

Red Horse by-election 9 March 2017
Party	Candidate	Votes	%	±%
Conservative	John Feilding	476	53.4	−9.0
Liberal Democrats	Philip Vial	266	29.8	+20.2
UKIP	Edward Fila	92	10.3	−4.9
Green	Pat Hotson	58	6.5	+6.5
Majority		210	23.5	
Turnout		892		
Conservative hold		Swing		

Ettington by-election 4 May 2017
Party	Candidate	Votes	%	±%
Conservative	Penny-Anne O'Donnell	949	74.3	+9.0
Liberal Democrats	Bill Dowling	227	17.8	+6.4
Green	Dave Passingham	102	8.0	+2.7
Majority		722	56.5	
Turnout		1,278		
Conservative hold		Swing		

=== 2019-2023 ===
Welford-on-Avon by-election 12 March 2020
Party	Candidate	Votes	%	±%
Liberal Democrats	Manuela Perteghella	472	43.6	+43.6
Conservative	Richard Cox	323	29.9	+8.8
Independent	Neal Appleton	231	21.3	+21.3
Labour	Anthony Kent	41	3.8	−1.5
Green	John Stott	15	1.4	−7.1
Majority		149	13.8	
Turnout		1,082		
Liberal Democrats gain from Independent		Swing		

=== 2023-2027 ===
Welford-on-Avon by-election 1 May 2025
Party	Candidate	Votes	%	±%
Liberal Democrats	Cliff Brown	485	45.5	−28.0
Reform	Neil Lawrence	330	31.0	+31.0
Conservative	Christian Reeve	190	17.8	−3.4
Labour	John Hartigan	41	3.8	+0.6
Green	Penny Stott	32	3.0	+0.9
Majority		155	14.5	−37.8
Turnout		1,069	41.05	−8.25
Liberal Democrats hold		Swing		

Alcester West by-election 1 May 2025
Party	Candidate	Votes	%	±%
Liberal Democrats	Tom Ballinger	403	32.9	−7.6
Reform	Ashley Jones	278	22.7	+22.7
Conservative	Emma Daniell	265	21.7	−4.5
Labour	Andrew Foster	241	19.7	−11.0
Green	John Stott	37	3.0	+0.4
Majority		125	10.2	+0.4
Turnout		1,224	44.75	−1.75
Liberal Democrats hold		Swing		

Quinton by-election 20 November 2025
Party	Candidate	Votes	%	±%
Liberal Democrats	Paul Harrison	437	47.3	+3.5
Reform	Sean Edmunds	306	33.1	+33.1
Conservative	Sarah Hession	137	14.8	−26.3
Green	Penny Stott	35	3.8	−4.7
Labour	John Hartigan	9	1.0	−5.6
Majority		131	14.2	
Turnout		924		
Liberal Democrats hold		Swing		

Salford Priors and Alcester Rural by-election 20 November 2025
Party	Candidate	Votes	%	±%
Reform	Ashley Jones	272	33.3	+33.3
Liberal Democrats	Huw Lewis	269	32.9	+9.7
Conservative	Justin Kerridge	227	27.8	−29.1
Green	Tom Genders	31	3.8	−5.3
Labour	Julie Fewins	18	2.2	−8.6
Majority		3	0.4	
Turnout		817		
Reform gain from Conservative		Swing		

Bishop's Itchington, Fenny Compton and Napton by-election 7 May 2026
Party	Candidate	Votes	%	±%
Liberal Democrats	Jake Beavan	1,104	38.1	
Reform	Jacqui Harris	751	25.9	
Conservative	Christian Reeve	715	24.7	
Green	Julie Folkes-Skinner	273	9.4	
Labour	Jacob Hill	53	1.8	
Majority		353	12.2	
Turnout		2,896		
Liberal Democrats hold		Swing		

Kinwarton by-election 9 July 2026
Party	Candidate	Votes	%	±%
Conservative	Janine Lee	507	36.4	
Liberal Democrats	Tina Ballinger	500	35.9	
Reform	Rachael Chadwick-Harrison	231	16.6	
Green	Lizzee Leedham	128	9.2	
Labour	Andrew Foster	28	2.0	
Majority		7	0.5	
Turnout		1,394		
Conservative gain from Liberal Democrats		Swing		
