= 2019 Stratford-on-Avon District Council election =

2019 UK local government election

- 2 May 2019

All 36 seats to Stratford-on-Avon District Council 19 seats needed for a majority

	First party	Second party
Party	Conservative	Liberal Democrats
Last election	21 seats, 53.9%	3 seats, 19.4%
Seats won	20	11
Seat change	▼11	▲8
Popular vote	17,047	10,669
Percentage	45.8%	28.7%
Swing	▼8.1%	▲9.3%
	Third party	Fourth party
Party	Independent	Green
Last election	1 seat, 1.6%	0 seats, 4.5%
Seats won	4	1
Seat change	▲3	▲1
Popular vote	2,232	4,446
Percentage	6.0%	12.0%
Swing	▲4.4%	▲7.5%
- Winner of each seat at the 2019 Stratford-on-Avon District Council election

- Composition of the council after the election
Council control before election
Conservative
Council control after election
Conservative

The 2019 Stratford-on-Avon District Council election took place on 2 May 2019 to elect members of the Stratford-on-Avon District Council in England. It was held on the same day as other local elections.

== Summary ==
=== Election result ===
2019 Stratford-on-Avon District Council election
Party	Candidates	Seats	Gains	Losses	Net gain/loss	Seats %	Votes %	Votes	+/−
Conservative	35	20	0	11	▼11	55.6	45.8	17,047	–8.1
Liberal Democrats	35	11	8	0	▲8	30.6	28.7	10,669	+9.3
Independent	4	4	3	0	▲3	11.1	6.0	2,232	+4.4
Green	36	1	1	0	▲1	2.8	12.0	4,446	+7.5
Labour	31	0	0	1	▼1	0.0	7.3	2,725	–5.7
UKIP	1	0	0	0	Steady	0.0	0.2	70	–5.7

== Ward results ==
=== Alcester & Rural ===
Alcester & Rural
Party	Candidate	Votes	%	±%
Conservative	Mark Cargill	712	58.0	−12.6
Labour	Andrew Foster	211	17.2	+7.2
Liberal Democrats	Carolyn Evans	197	16.1	−3.2
Green	Michael Mordue	107	8.7	New
Majority				
Rejected ballots		24	1.92	
Turnout		1,251	42.7	
Registered electors		2,930		
Conservative hold		Swing		

=== Alcester Town ===
Alcester Town
Party	Candidate	Votes	%	±%
Liberal Democrats	Susan Juned	482	47.6	+18.2
Conservative	Susan Adams	404	39.9	−14.5
Labour	Emma Randle	70	6.9	−4.5
Green	Jacob Hotson	57	5.6	+0.8
Majority				
Rejected ballots		16	1.55	
Turnout		1,030	34.7	
Registered electors		2,968		
Liberal Democrats gain from Conservative		Swing		

=== Avenue ===
Avenue
Party	Candidate	Votes	%	±%
Green	Jon Riley	279	41.4	+32.8
Liberal Democrats	Cohl Warren-Howles	170	25.2	+10.2
Conservative	Juliet Short	166	24.6	−18.3
Labour	Karen Brown	59	8.8	−7.7
Majority				
Rejected ballots		6	0.88	
Turnout		680	27.8	
Registered electors		2,445		
Green gain from Conservative		Swing		

=== Bidford East ===
Bidford East
Party	Candidate	Votes	%	±%
Conservative	Darren Pemberton	516	51.4	−2.9
Labour	Anthony Kent	212	21.1	+1.1
Liberal Democrats	Manuela Perteghella	170	16.9	+8.2
Green	Thomas Venus	106	10.6	New
Majority				
Rejected ballots		20	1.95	
Turnout		1,024	33.3	
Registered electors		3,075		
Conservative hold		Swing		

=== Bidford West & Salford ===
Bidford West & Salford
Party	Candidate	Votes	%	±%
Conservative	William Fleming	529	57.1	−2.7
Green	Thomas Genders	167	18.0	New
Liberal Democrats	William Horton	140	15.1	New
Labour	Christopher Jury	90	9.7	−11.7
Majority				
Rejected ballots		14	1.49	
Turnout		940	32.2	
Registered electors		2,923		
Conservative hold		Swing		

=== Bishops Itchington ===
Bishop Itchington
Party	Candidate	Votes	%	±%
Conservative	Christopher Kettle	644	63.5	−3.6
Liberal Democrats	Fiona Larner Onslow-Free	214	21.1	+12.3
Green	Matthew North	156	15.4	+5.6
Majority				
Rejected ballots		19	1.84	
Turnout		1,033	33.7	
Registered electors		3,069		
Conservative hold		Swing		

=== Bishopton ===
Bishopton
Party	Candidate	Votes	%	±%
Liberal Democrats	Victoria Alcock	443	56.8	+16.6
Conservative	Roger Brain	209	26.8	−15.3
Green	Bruno Mason	70	9.0	+0.9
Labour	Aaron Marshall	58	7.4	−0.7
Majority				
Rejected ballots		16	2.01	
Turnout		796	31.5	
Registered electors		2,524		
Liberal Democrats gain from Conservative		Swing		

=== Brailes & Compton ===
Brailes & Compton
Party	Candidate	Votes	%	±%
Conservative	Sarah Whalley-Hoggins	691	60.3	−11.6
Liberal Democrats	Sara Billins	251	21.9	+7.9
Green	Anne Waldon	135	11.8	New
Labour	Ronan Woods	69	6.0	−8.1
Majority				
Rejected ballots		26	2.22	
Turnout		1,172	42.5	
Registered electors		2,757		
Conservative hold		Swing		

=== Bridgetown ===
Bridgetown
Party	Candidate	Votes	%	±%
Liberal Democrats	Ian Fradgley	596	47.2	+9.5
Conservative	Lynda Organ	464	36.7	−9.4
Green	Stephen Ward	115	9.1	+2.0
Labour	Robin Malloy	89	7.0	−2.1
Majority				
Rejected ballots		19	1.48	
Turnout		1,283	40.7	
Registered electors		3,154		
Liberal Democrats gain from Conservative		Swing		

=== Clopton ===
Clopton
Party	Candidate	Votes	%	±%
Independent	Jason Fojtik	404	56.5	New
Liberal Democrats	Philip How	180	25.2	+4.3
Conservative	Ryan Podmore	92	12.9	−13.5
Green	Elliot Wassell	39	5.5	+0.2
Majority				
Rejected ballots		12	1.65	
Turnout		727	39.0	
Registered electors		1,865		
Independent gain from Labour		Swing		

=== Ettington ===
Ettington
Party	Candidate	Votes	%	±%
Conservative	Penny-Anne O'Donnell	782	67.0	+1.7
Liberal Democrats	Nina Knapman	171	14.6	+3.2
Green	Angela Webb	158	13.5	+8.2
Labour	Alexander Monk	57	4.9	−3.5
Majority				
Rejected ballots		17	1.43	
Turnout		1,185	42.7	
Registered electors		2,775		
Conservative hold		Swing		

=== Guildhall ===
Guildhall
Party	Candidate	Votes	%	±%
Liberal Democrats	Jennifer Fradgley	710	63.9	+25.5
Conservative	Karen Parnell	225	20.3	−13.2
Green	Stephen Michaux	105	9.5	+1.6
Labour	Neil Annat	71	6.4	−3.6
Majority				
Rejected ballots		21	1.86	
Turnout		1,132	44.2	
Registered electors		2,559		
Liberal Democrats hold		Swing		

=== Harbury ===
Harbury
Party	Candidate	Votes	%	±%
Independent	Jacqueline Harris	451	40.7	New
Liberal Democrats	Suzannah Bushill	418	37.7	+2.6
Green	David Watkin	133	12.0	+4.6
Labour	Thomas Greenway	107	9.6	−0.8
Majority				
Rejected ballots		28	2.47	
Turnout		1,132	39.7	
Registered electors		2,852		
Independent gain from Conservative		Swing		

=== Hathaway ===
Hathaway
Party	Candidate	Votes	%	±%
Liberal Democrats	Gillian Cleeve	304	46.3	+9.7
Conservative	Timothy Sinclair	146	22.2	−13.9
Labour	Kieran Kelly	111	16.9	+1.0
Green	Peter Pettifor	96	14.6	+3.3
Majority				
Rejected ballots		11	1.65	
Turnout		668	29.6	
Registered electors		2,259		
Liberal Democrats hold		Swing		

=== Henley-in-Arden ===
Henley-in-Arden
Party	Candidate	Votes	%	±%
Conservative	Matthew Jennings	805	65.2	−5.1
Green	Penelope Stott	241	19.5	+10.3
Liberal Democrats	Karyl Rees	107	8.7	+0.2
Labour	Christopher Jones	81	6.6	−5.3
Majority				
Rejected ballots		23	1.83	
Turnout		1,257	40.2	
Registered electors		3,130		
Conservative hold		Swing		

=== Kineton ===
Kineton
Party	Candidate	Votes	%	±%
Conservative	Christopher Mills	824	66.8	+5.0
Liberal Democrats	Nicholas Solman	210	17.0	+8.1
Green	Robert Ballantyne	199	16.1	+9.3
Majority				
Rejected ballots		16	1.28	
Turnout		1,249	42.7	
Registered electors		2,922		
Conservative hold		Swing		

=== Kinwarton ===
Kinwarton
Party	Candidate	Votes	%	±%
Conservative	Gillian Forman	520	54.1	−13.5
Liberal Democrats	Lynn Bowring	302	31.4	+7.5
Green	Therese Venus	82	8.5	New
Labour	Kathrin Foster	57	5.9	−2.6
Majority				
Rejected ballots		11	1.13	
Turnout		972	42.2	
Registered electors		2,303		
Conservative hold		Swing		

=== Long Itchington & Stockton ===
Long Itchington & Stockton
Party	Candidate	Votes	%	±%
Liberal Democrats	Louis Adam	491	46.2	+33.2
Conservative	Ben Dalton	355	33.4	−34.3
Labour	James Briggs	123	11.6	−7.7
Green	Elizabeth Donovan	93	8.8	New
Majority				
Rejected ballots		28	2.57	
Turnout		1,090	32.7	
Registered electors		3,333		
Liberal Democrats gain from Conservative		Swing		

=== Napton & Fenny Compton ===
Napton & Fenny Compton
Party	Candidate	Votes	%	±%
Liberal Democrats	Nigel Rock	539	50.8	+36.6
Conservative	Emilia Fletcher	394	37.2	−19.7
Green	Zoe James	127	12.0	New
Majority				
Rejected ballots		19	1.76	
Turnout		1,079	40.9	
Registered electors		2,641		
Liberal Democrats gain from Conservative		Swing		

=== Quinton ===
Quinton
Party	Candidate	Votes	%	±%
Conservative	Edward Fitter	515	59.1	−7.8
Green	Olivia Hatch	180	20.6	New
Liberal Democrats	Diane Walden	107	12.3	+2.0
Labour	Nicholas Partington	70	8.0	−1.4
Majority				
Rejected ballots		19	2.13	
Turnout		891	33.0	
Registered electors		2,697		
Conservative hold		Swing		

=== Red Horse ===
Red Horse
Party	Candidate	Votes	%	±%
Conservative	John Feilding	698	61.6	−0.8
Green	Allison Aves	226	19.9	New
Liberal Democrats	John Insoll	135	11.9	+1.6
Labour	Janice Sewell	75	6.6	−2.8
Majority				
Rejected ballots		19	1.65	
Turnout		1,153	42.6	
Registered electors		2,708		
Conservative hold		Swing		

=== Shipston North ===
Shipston North
Party	Candidate	Votes	%	±%
Conservative	Trevor Harvey	545	54.6	+1.1
Liberal Democrats	Roger Billins	238	23.8	New
Green	Peter Landsman	133	13.3	+5.7
Labour	Jan Ozimkowski	82	8.2	−17.2
Majority				
Rejected ballots		18	1.77	
Turnout		1,017	33.9	
Registered electors		3,002		
Conservative hold		Swing		

=== Shipston South ===
Shipston South
Party	Candidate	Votes	%	±%
Conservative	Joanna Barker	546	50.9	+14.6
Liberal Democrats	John Dinnie	316	29.5	−6.0
Green	David Passingham	119	11.1	+6.8
Labour	Frances Lee	92	8.6	−5.5
Majority				
Rejected ballots		18	1.65	
Turnout		1,091	38.7	
Registered electors		2,819		
Conservative hold		Swing		

=== Shottery ===
Shottery
Party	Candidate	Votes	%	±%
Liberal Democrats	David Curtis	527	53.8	+23.8
Conservative	Jake Findlater	316	32.2	−11.5
Green	Jenny Harding	98	10.0	+1.5
Labour	Robert Williams	39	4.0	−4.4
Majority				
Rejected ballots		13	1.31	
Turnout		993	41.3	
Registered electors		2,403		
Liberal Democrats gain from Conservative		Swing		

=== Snitterfield ===
Snitterfield
Party	Candidate	Votes	%	±%
Conservative	Peter Richards	694	62.3	−7.0
Green	Rosie Parker	198	17.8	+8.0
Liberal Democrats	Roger Harding	162	14.5	+3.8
Labour	Liam Bridge	60	5.4	−3.7
Majority				
Rejected ballots		33	2.87	
Turnout		1,151	39.8	
Registered electors		2,892		
Conservative hold		Swing		

=== Southam North ===
Southam North
Party	Candidate	Votes	%	±%
Independent	Tony Bromwich	480	56.9	New
Conservative	Richard Hobbs	167	19.8	−31.3
Liberal Democrats	David Booth	115	13.6	+4.0
Green	Patricia Hotson	82	9.7	New
Majority				
Rejected ballots		7	0.82	
Turnout		851	31.1	
Registered electors		2,741		
Independent gain from Conservative		Swing		

=== Southam South ===
Southam South
Party	Candidate	Votes	%	±%
Conservative	Andrew Crump	652	67.8	+10.4
Labour	Helen Wilson	148	15.4	−2.7
Green	Derek Price	83	8.6	+1.9
Liberal Democrats	Susan Roderick	79	8.2	+3.8
Majority				
Rejected ballots		8	0.82	
Turnout		970	34.6	
Registered electors		2,800		
Conservative hold		Swing		

=== Studley with Mappleborough Green ===
Studley with Mappleborough Green
Party	Candidate	Votes	%	±%
Liberal Democrats	Peter Hencher-Serafin	447	43.7	+4.7
Conservative	Justin Kerridge	395	38.6	−4.2
Green	Victoria Widdowson	92	9.0	+3.4
Labour	Watne Bates	89	8.7	−4.8
Majority				
Rejected ballots		12	1.16	
Turnout		1,035	34.7	
Registered electors		2,981		
Liberal Democrats gain from Conservative		Swing		

=== Studley with Sambourne ===
Studley with Sambourne
Party	Candidate	Votes	%	±%
Liberal Democrats	Neil Edden	424	42.4	+11.1
Conservative	Paul Beaman	367	36.7	+4.1
Green	Valerie Gaize	105	10.5	+8.3
Labour	Christopher Pilkington	103	10.3	−7.8
Majority				
Rejected ballots		10	0.99	
Turnout		1,009	34.4	
Registered electors		2,935		
Liberal Democrats gain from Conservative		Swing		

=== Tanworth-in-Arden ===
Tanworth-in-Arden
Party	Candidate	Votes	%	±%
Conservative	Anthony Dixon	650	78.8	+9.4
Liberal Democrats	Joseph Benjamin	76	9.2	+2.4
Green	John Stott	72	8.7	New
Labour	Anthony O'Hagan	27	3.3	−15.5
Majority				
Rejected ballots		14	1.67	
Turnout		839	31.9	
Registered electors		2,628		
Conservative hold		Swing		

=== Tiddington ===
Tiddington
Party	Candidate	Votes	%	±%
Liberal Democrats	Catherine Rolfe	873	66.8	+18.7
Conservative	Philip Applin	316	24.2	−15.5
Green	Jack Fildew	62	4.7	±0.0
Labour	Helen Cooper	56	4.3	−3.1
Majority				
Rejected ballots		17	1.28	
Turnout		1,323	44.1	
Registered electors		2,997		
Liberal Democrats hold		Swing		

=== Welcombe ===
Welcombe
Party	Candidate	Votes	%	±%
Conservative	Anthony Jefferson	433	44.0	+7.1
Liberal Democrats	Elizabeth Coles	379	38.6	+22.8
Green	Duncan Parker	108	11.0	+5.2
Labour	Sally Bigwood	63	6.4	−2.8
Majority				
Rejected ballots		21	2.09	
Turnout		1,004	40.6	
Registered electors		2,476		
Conservative hold		Swing		

=== Welford-on-Avon ===
Welford-on-Avon
Party	Candidate	Votes	%	±%
Independent	Frederick Barnes	897	65.1	+17.7
Conservative	Richard Cox	291	21.1	−25.8
Green	Ian Cuthbertson	117	8.5	New
Labour	George Spicer	73	5.3	−0.3
Majority				
Rejected ballots		6	0.43	
Turnout		1,384	44.7	
Registered electors		3,096		
Independent hold		Swing		

=== Wellesbourne East ===
Wellesbourne East
Party	Candidate	Votes	%	±%
Conservative	Anne Parry	590	48.5	−0.7
Liberal Democrats	David Johnston	391	32.2	+4.5
Labour	Hazel Haywood	105	8.6	+0.9
UKIP	Frank Rietz	70	5.8	−4.1
Green	Roger Fisher	60	4.9	−0.6
Majority				
Rejected ballots		12	0.98	
Turnout		1,228	41.5	
Registered electors		2,958		
Conservative hold		Swing		

=== Wellesbourne West ===
Wellsbourne West
Party	Candidate	Votes	%	±%
Conservative	Daniel Kendall	653	64.5	+4.9
Liberal Democrats	Deborah Chowdhury	151	14.9	−9.4
Labour	Carol Canty	112	11.1	+1.3
Green	Victoria Parker	97	9.6	+3.4
Majority				
Rejected ballots		15	1.46	
Turnout		1,028	34.3	
Registered electors		2,994		
Conservative hold		Swing		

=== Wootton Wawen ===
Wootton Wawen
Party	Candidate	Votes	%	±%
Conservative	Ian Shenton	741	66.8	+11.9
Liberal Democrats	John Bicknell	154	13.9	+3.0
Green	Charlotte McClymont	149	13.4	+6.2
Labour	Philip Heath	66	5.9	−3.2
Majority				
Rejected ballots		16	1.42	
Turnout		1,126	38.6	
Registered electors		2,919		
Conservative hold		Swing		

== Changes 2019–2023 ==
- John Feilding, elected as a Conservative, resigned from the party in January 2023 to sit as an independent.
- Jason Fojtik, elected as an independent in May 2019, rejoined the Labour Party (which he had left shortly before the 2019 election) in March 2023.

=== By-elections ===
==== Welford-on-Avon ====
Welford-on-Avon by-election: 12 March 2020
Party	Candidate	Votes	%	±%
Liberal Democrats	Manuela Perteghella	472	43.6	New
Conservative	Richard Cox	323	29.9	+8.8
Independent	Neal Appleton	231	21.3	New
Labour	Anthony Kent	41	3.8	−1.5
Green	John Stott	15	1.4	−7.1
Majority		149	13.7	
Rejected ballots		2	0.18	
Turnout		1,084	32.1	−12.6
Registered electors		3,377		
Liberal Democrats gain from Independent		Swing		

The by-election was triggered by the death of the sitting Independent councillor, Peter Barnes, in early January 2020.
