= 2011 Stratford-on-Avon District Council election =

2011 UK local government election

Results of the 2011 Stratford-on-Avon District Council election

The 2011 Stratford-on-Avon District Council election to the Stratford-on-Avon District Council took place on Thursday 5 May 2011.

Seventeen seats were up for election, one third of the councillors. The previous elections in 2010 produced a majority for the Conservative Party.

== Election result ==
Stratford-on-Avon Council Election, 2011
| Party | Seats | Gains | Losses | Net gain/loss | Seats % | Votes % | Votes | +/− |
|---|---|---|---|---|---|---|---|---|
| Conservative | 13 | +2 | -1 | +1 | | 49.9 | 16,568 | |
| Labour | 0 | | | | | 11.3 | 3,740 | |
| Liberal Democrats | 4 | | -2 | -2 | | 29.2 | 9,694 | |
| Green | 0 | | | | | 1.6 | 528 | |
| Henley and Beaudesert Independent Conservatives | 0 | | | | | | | |
| Stratford First Independent | 1 | +1 | | +1 | | | | |

== Ward results ==
Alcester Ward
| Party | Candidate | Votes | % | ±% |
|---|---|---|---|---|
| Labour | Andrew Mark Foster | 326 | | |
| Liberal Democrats | Katherine Mary Long | 366 | | |
| Conservative | Eric Alfred Payne | 1612 | | |
| Majority | | | | |
| Turnout | | | 48.1 | |
| Conservative hold | | Swing | | |

Bidford and Salford Ward
| Party | Candidate | Votes | % | ±% |
|---|---|---|---|---|
| Labour | Barry Doherty | 354 | | |
| Vox Pop Independent | Bill Fleming | 881 | | |
| Conservative | Maurice Reginald Howse | 1136 | | |
| Majority | | | | |
| Turnout | | | 43.8 | |
| Conservative hold | | Swing | | |

Fenny Compton Ward
| Party | Candidate | Votes | % | ±% |
|---|---|---|---|---|
| Liberal Democrats | David Booth | 336 | | |
| Conservative | Chris Williams | 695 | | |
| Majority | | 359 | | |
| Turnout | | | 55.4 | |
| Conservative hold | | Swing | | |

Harbury Ward
| Party | Candidate | Votes | % | ±% |
|---|---|---|---|---|
| Conservative | Richard Derek Hamburger | 994 | | |
| Liberal Democrats | Sue Roderick | 950 | | |
| Majority | | 44 | | |
| Turnout | | | 53.5 | |
| Conservative hold | | Swing | | |

Henley Ward
| Party | Candidate | Votes | % | ±% |
|---|---|---|---|---|
| Liberal Democrats | James Robert Handy | 169 | | |
| Labour | John Hartigan | 192 | | |
| Henley and Beaudesert Independent Conservatives | Bill Leech | 335 | | |
| Conservative | George Matheou | 1027 | | |
| Majority | | | | |
| Turnout | | | 48.2 | |
| Conservative hold | | Swing | | |

Kineton Ward
| Party | Candidate | Votes | % | ±% |
|---|---|---|---|---|
| Green | Robert Ballantyne | 261 | | |
| Liberal Democrats | John Wallace Talbot Insoll | 278 | | |
| Conservative | Chris Mills | 1109 | | |
| Majority | | | | |
| Turnout | | | 50.3 | |
| Conservative hold | | Swing | | |

Shipston Ward
| Party | Candidate | Votes | % | ±% |
|---|---|---|---|---|
| Labour | Christopher Aston | 262 | 13.02 | +2.02 |
| Conservative | Jonathan Gullis | 883 | 43.90 | +5.30 |
| Liberal Democrats | Philip Vial | 866 | 43.06 | −4.94 |
| Majority | | 17 | 0.84 | −8.46 |
| Turnout | | 2011 | 49.6 | −21.4 |
| Conservative gain from Liberal Democrats | | Swing | | |

Southam Ward
| Party | Candidate | Votes | % | ±% |
|---|---|---|---|---|
| Liberal Democrats | Peter Alexander Hedges | 254 | | |
| Labour | Carol Ann Pratt | 772 | | |
| Conservative | David Arthur James Wise | 1162 | | |
| Majority | | | | |
| Turnout | | | 44.1 | |
| Conservative hold | | Swing | | |

Stockton and Napton Ward
| Party | Candidate | Votes | % | ±% |
|---|---|---|---|---|
| Liberal Democrats | Steven Kittendorf | 673 | | |
| Conservative | Richard Jonathan Lamb | 316 | | |
| Majority | | 357 | | |
| Turnout | | | 52.6 | |
| Liberal Democrats hold | | Swing | | |

Stratford Alveston Ward
| Party | Candidate | Votes | % | ±% |
|---|---|---|---|---|
| Labour | Tracy Jayne Doherty | 359 | | |
| Liberal Democrats | Janette Elizabeth Dyson | 1044 | | |
| Conservative | Lynda Margaret Organ | 1560 | | |
| Majority | | | | |
| Turnout | | | 51.6 | |
| Conservative hold | | Swing | | |

Stratford Avenue and New Town Ward
| Party | Candidate | Votes | % | ±% |
|---|---|---|---|---|
| Liberal Democrats | Geoffrey Dewhurst | 514 | | |
| Conservative | Ian Hurst | 796 | | |
| Stratford First Independent | Keith Lloyd | 1009 | | |
| Labour | Stephen Troup | 254 | | |
| Majority | | | | |
| Turnout | | | 41.9 | |
| Stratford First Independent gain from Conservative | | Swing | | |

Stratford Guild and Hathaway Ward
| Party | Candidate | Votes | % | ±% |
|---|---|---|---|---|
| Conservative | Neville Beamer | 1458 | | |
| Liberal Democrats | Louise Mary Rose Brandon | 739 | | |
| Labour | Samuel Hargreaves | 381 | | |
| Stratford First Independent | John Packard | 221 | | |
| Majority | | | | |
| Turnout | | | 47.8 | |
| Conservative hold | | Swing | | |

Stratford Mount Pleasant Ward
| Party | Candidate | Votes | % | ±% |
|---|---|---|---|---|
| Labour | Andrew James Paul Henderson | 177 | | |
| Stratford First Independent | Bill Lowe | 222 | | |
| Liberal Democrats | Peter Geoffrey Williams Moorse | 648 | | |
| Conservative | Karen Dawn Parnell | 353 | | |
| Majority | | | | |
| Turnout | | | 41.1 | |
| Liberal Democrats hold | | Swing | | |

Studley Ward
| Party | Candidate | Votes | % | ±% |
|---|---|---|---|---|
| Labour | Wayne Bates | 462 | | |
| Liberal Democrats | Eric Holder | 788 | | |
| Conservative | Mike Weddell | 774 | | |
| Majority | | 14 | | |
| Turnout | | | 44.2 | |
| Liberal Democrats hold | | Swing | | |

Tredington Ward
| Party | Candidate | Votes | % | ±% |
|---|---|---|---|---|
| Labour | Jeffrey Simon Kenner | 142 | | |
| Conservative | Chris Saint | 733 | | |
| Liberal Democrats | Rachel Helen Vial | 208 | | |
| Majority | | | | |
| Turnout | | | 57.5 | |
| Conservative hold | | Swing | | |

Welford Ward
| Party | Candidate | Votes | % | ±% |
|---|---|---|---|---|
| Liberal Democrats | Peter Barnes | 675 | | |
| Labour | Philip Heath | 59 | | |
| Conservative | Robert Thomas Vaudry | 416 | | |
| Majority | | | | |
| Turnout | | | 68.5 | |
| Liberal Democrats hold | | Swing | | |

Wellesbourne Ward
| Party | Candidate | Votes | % | ±% |
|---|---|---|---|---|
| Liberal Democrats | David John Close | 1186 | | |
| Green | Roger Fisher | 267 | | |
| Conservative | Danny Kendall | 1544 | | |
| Majority | | 358 | | |
| Turnout | | | 54.5 | |
| Conservative gain from Liberal Democrats | | Swing | | |
