= Spelthorne Borough Council elections =

Local government elections in Surrey, England

Spelthorne Borough Council in Surrey, England was elected every four years. Since the last boundary changes in 2003, 39 councillors are elected from 13 wards. The council is due to be abolished on 1 April 2027 following structural changes to local government in Surrey.

== Council elections ==
Composition of the council
Year	Conservative	Labour	Liberal Democrats (Note: Includes totals for the predecessors of the Liberal Democrats, the Liberal Party and SDP (both of which participated in the Alliance).)	Green (Note: Includes totals for the predecessors of the Green Party of England and Wales, the Ecology Party and Green Party UK.)	Independents & Others	Council control after election
Local government reorganisation; council established (52 seats)
1973	39	13	0	–	0	Conservative
1976	45	7	0	0	0	Conservative
New ward boundaries (40 seats)
1979	38	2	0	0	0	Conservative
1983	36	4	0	0	0	Conservative
1987	38	2	0	0	0	Conservative
1991	33	4	3	0	0	Conservative
1995	21	16	3	0	0	Conservative
1999	27	9	4	0	0	Conservative
New ward boundaries (39 seats)
2003	35	0	4	0	0	Conservative
2007	31	0	8	0	0	Conservative
2011	32	0	6	0	1	Conservative
2015	35	1	3	0	0	Conservative
2019	23	4	8	2	2	Conservative
2023	12	7	10	3	7	No overall control

== Results maps ==
2003 results map

2007 results map

2011 results map

2015 results map

2019 results map

2023 results map

== By-election results ==
=== 1995–1999 ===
Ashford West By-Election 28 May 1998
Party	Candidate	Votes	%	±%
Conservative	G E Forsbrey	455	54.1	+24.5
Labour	H Cooper	277	32.9	−7.9
Liberal Democrats	L de Laune	109	13.0	+6.2
Majority		178	21.2	
Turnout		841	43.6	
Conservative gain from Labour		Swing		

Stanwell North By-Election 2 July 1998
Party	Candidate	Votes	%	±%
Labour	Victor Agarwal	610	46.0	−18.9
Conservative		605	45.7	+19.4
Liberal Democrats		110	8.3	−0.5
Majority		5	0.3	
Turnout		1,325		
Labour hold		Swing		

=== 1999–2003 ===
Ashford North By-Election 23 March 2000
Party	Candidate	Votes	%	±%
Conservative	Patricia Weston	508	58.9	+3.2
Labour	John May	235	27.2	−9.9
Independent	Eric Butterfield	80	9.3	+9.3
Liberal Democrats	Brian Bird	40	4.6	−2.6
Majority		273	31.7	
Turnout		863	26.3	
Conservative hold		Swing		

Laleham By-Election 14 June 2001
Party	Candidate	Votes	%	±%
Conservative	James Fullbrook	532	51.4	−0.5
Labour	Joyce Trace	339	32.8	−5.8
Liberal Democrats	Jonathan Edwards	164	15.8	+6.3
Majority		193	18.6	
Turnout		1,035	17.9	
Conservative hold		Swing		

=== 2007–2011 ===
Ashford East By-Election 23 October 2008
Party	Candidate	Votes	%	±%
Conservative	Steven Rough	858	51.7	−1.4
Liberal Democrats	Diane Appleby	452	27.3	+13.4
UKIP	Christopher Browne	185	11.2	+11.2
Labour	Mark Appleyard	163	9.8	−3.1
Majority		406	24.4	
Turnout		1,658	29.8	
Conservative hold		Swing		

Ashford East By-Election 4 June 2009
Party	Candidate	Votes	%	±%
Conservative	Patricia Amos	903	43.4	−9.8
Liberal Democrats	Diane Appleby	543	26.1	+12.3
UKIP	Christopher Browne	457	22.0	+22.0
Labour	John May	179	8.6	−4.3
Majority		360	17.3	
Turnout		2,082	37.3	
Conservative hold		Swing		

Laleham and Shepperton Green By-Election 1 October 2009
Party	Candidate	Votes	%	±%
Conservative	Stephen Fairfax	814	42.2	−16.2
Liberal Democrats	Richard Dunn	742	38.5	+13.4
UKIP	Peter Parker	154	8.0	+8.0
Independent	Lawrence Burrell	142	7.4	+7.4
Labour	Ian French	77	4.0	−12.6
Majority		72	3.7	
Turnout		1,929	33	
Conservative hold		Swing		

=== 2011–2015 ===
Sunbury Common By-Election 19 December 2012
Party	Candidate	Votes	%	±%
Liberal Democrats	Bernie Spoor	372	46.6	−10.1
UKIP	Bob Bromley	182	22.8	+6.1
Labour	John Went	129	16.2	+16.2
Conservative	Matthew Want	115	14.4	−12.2
Majority		190	23.8	
Turnout		798		
Liberal Democrats hold		Swing		

Sunbury East By-Election 2 May 2013
Party	Candidate	Votes	%	±%
Conservative	Ian Harvey	635	37.7	−13.3
Liberal Democrats	Kathy Grant	583	34.6	−14.4
UKIP	Bob Bromley	468	27.8	+27.8
Majority		52	3.1	
Turnout		1,686		
Conservative gain from Liberal Democrats		Swing		

Riverside and Laleham By-Election 7 November 2013
Party	Candidate	Votes	%	±%
Conservative	Denise Saliagopoulos	895	55.3	+3.6
UKIP	Michael Fuller	441	27.2	+11.7
Labour	John Johnston	227	14.0	+14.0
Liberal Democrats	Susan Vincent	56	3.5	−29.3
Majority		454	28.0	
Turnout		1,619		
Conservative hold		Swing		

=== 2015–2019 ===
Shepperton Town By-Election 15 December 2015
Party	Candidate	Votes	%	±%
Conservative	Colin Barnard	858	62.0	+6.0
UKIP	Brian Catt	180	13.0	−5.4
Liberal Democrats	Richard Dunn	154	11.1	−0.8
Labour	Jonathan Button	123	8.9	−4.8
Green	Nigel Scott	68	4.9	+4.9
Majority		678	49.0	
Turnout		1,383		
Conservative hold		Swing		

Ashford North and Stanwell South By-Election 5 May 2016
Party	Candidate	Votes	%	±%
Conservative	John Boughtflower	658	37.4	+6.7
Labour	Iain Raymond	487	27.7	+4.8
UKIP	Gerald Gravett	393	22.3	−3.8
Green	Gordon Douglas	133	7.6	−1.3
Liberal Democrats	Alan Mockford	59	3.4	−2.1
TUSC	Paul Couchman	30	1.7	+1.7
Majority		171	9.7	
Turnout		1,760		
Conservative hold		Swing		

Ashford East By-Election 4 May 2017
Party	Candidate	Votes	%	±%
Conservative	Alex Sapunovas	951	50.0	+9.4
UKIP	Paul West	384	20.2	−9.6
Labour	Mark Appleyard	382	20.1	+2.5
Liberal Democrats	Thomas Fidler	185	9.7	+9.7
Majority		567	29.8	
Turnout		1,902		
Conservative hold		Swing		

=== 2019–2023 ===
Staines South By-Election 6 May 2021
Party	Candidate	Votes	%	±%
Conservative	Sinead Mooney	675	36.6	+17.0
Liberal Democrats	Rob Millist	668	36.2	−2.0
Labour	Harriet Digby	319	17.3	−5.5
Independent	Lesley Connor	154	8.3	+8.3
TUSC	Paul Couchman	30	1.6	+1.6
Majority		7	0.4	
Turnout		1,846		
Conservative gain from Liberal Democrats		Swing		

Staines By-Election 22 July 2021
Party	Candidate	Votes	%	±%
Green	Malcolm Beecher	651	44.0	+5.5
Conservative	Michael Zenonos	486	32.8	+8.0
Independent	Paul West	275	18.6	+18.6
TUSC	Paul Couchman	39	2.6	+2.6
Reform	Gerald Gravett	29	2.0	+2.0
Majority		165	11.1	
Turnout		1,480		
Green hold		Swing		

Stanwell North By-Election 23 February 2022
Party	Candidate	Votes	%	±%
Labour	Jon Button	605	48.8	+6.0
Conservative	Michael Zenonos	567	45.7	+7.6
TUSC	Paul Couchman	69	5.6	+5.6
Majority		38	3.1	
Turnout		1,241		
Labour gain from Conservative		Swing		

Laleham and Shepperton Green By-Election 25 May 2022
Party	Candidate	Votes	%	±%
Green	Stuart Whitmore	903	51.7	+32.0
Conservative	Karen Howkins	775	44.4	+8.9
TUSC	Paul Couchman	69	3.9	+3.9
Majority		128	7.3	
Turnout		1,747		
Green gain from Conservative		Swing		

Laleham and Shepperton Green By-Election 11 August 2022
Party	Candidate	Votes	%	±%
Conservative	Karen Howkins	810	55.5	+20.0
Liberal Democrats	John Thesiger	578	39.6	+23.4
TUSC	Paul Couchman	71	4.9	+4.9
Majority		232	15.9	
Turnout		1,459		
Conservative hold		Swing		

=== 2023–2027 ===
Ashford Town By-Election 6 September 2023
Party	Candidate	Votes	%	±%
Conservative	Paul Woodward	562	37.5	
Independent	John Enright	420	28.0	
Green	Stuart Whitmore	252	16.8	
Labour	Mark Kluth	212	14.1	
Reform	Rory O'Brien	35	2.3	
TUSC	Paul Couchman	19	1.3	
Majority		142	9.5	
Turnout		1,500		
Conservative gain from Green		Swing		

Ashford East By-Election 4 July 2024
Party	Candidate	Votes	%	±%
Conservative	Sinead Mooney	973	27.4	
Independent	Philip Baldock	870	24.5	
Labour	Jared Kidd	790	22.2	
Reform	Paul Brew	575	16.2	
Liberal Democrats	Satpal Thethy	343	9.7	
Majority		103	2.9	
Turnout		3,551		
Conservative gain from Independent		Swing		

Ashford Town By-Election 19 June 2025
Party	Candidate	Votes	%	±%
Liberal Democrats	Gregory Neall	539	27.4	
Reform	Jason Gelver	459	23.4	
Conservative	Alex Balkan	374	19.0	
Independent	Philip Baldock	359	18.3	
Labour	Rhiannon Lewis	234	11.9	
Majority		80	4.1	
Turnout		1,965		
Liberal Democrats gain from Conservative		Swing		

Staines By-Election 16 October 2025
Party	Candidate	Votes	%	±%
Liberal Democrats	Laura Barker	804	37.9	+37.9
Reform	Harry Phillips	499	23.5	+23.5
Independent	Sean Freeman	261	12.3	−31.9
Conservative	Mark Francis	231	10.9	−14.3
Green	Stuart Whitmore	163	7.7	−49.7
Labour	Jared Kidd	158	7.4	−27.3
TUSC	Paul Couchman	8	0.4	+0.4
Majority		305	14.4	
Turnout		2,124		
Liberal Democrats gain from Green		Swing	+32.8	
