= 2015 Spelthorne Borough Council election =

← 2011	7 May 2015	2019 →

All 39 seats to Spelthorne Borough Council
- Results of the 2015 Spelthorne Borough Council election

The 2015 Spelthorne Borough Council election took place on 7 May 2015 to elect all members of Spelthorne Borough Council in England as one of the 2015 local elections, held simultaneously with the General Election.

== Summary ==
=== Election result ===
Counting three intermittent by-elections (resulting in a Conservative gain and hold and a Liberal Democrat hold) and five defections from the governing party group in the 2011-2015 period (Cllrs Budd, D. Grant, Forsbrey, Rough and Sexton) the results saw these net changes:

2015 Spelthorne Borough Council election
Party	Candidates	Seats	Gains	Losses	Net gain/loss	Seats %	Votes %	Votes	+/−
Conservative	39	35	6	1	▲5	90	48	60048	
Liberal Democrats	17	3	0	1	▼1	8	10	12599	
Labour	31	1	1	0	▲1	2	18	22392	
UKIP	19	0	0	1	▼1	0	15	19041	
Green	6	0	0	0	0	0	3	3264	
Spelthorne Independent Party	12	0	0	4	▼4	0	6	8125	N/A
TUSC	4	0	0	0	0	0	0.4	475	N/A

== Ward by ward ==
Ashford Common (3 seats)
Party	Candidate	Votes	%	±%
Conservative	John Kavanagh	1,825		
Conservative	Howard Thomson	1,820		
Conservative	Howard Williams	1,444		
UKIP	Bob Bromley	1437		
Labour	Marjorie Martin	891		
Spelthorne Independent Party	Frank Ayres	832		
Labour	Cidi Greenaway	830		
Spelthorne Independent Party	Marion Bushnell	738		
Spelthorne Independent Party	Denise Grant	661		
Majority				
Turnout				
Conservative hold		Swing		
Conservative hold		Swing		
Conservative hold		Swing		

Ashford East (3 seats)
Party	Candidate	Votes	%	±%
Conservative	Rose Chandler	1,765		
Conservative	Anthony Mitchell	1,644		
Conservative	Chris Frazer	1,481		
UKIP	Dean Botterill	1296		
UKIP	Paul Humphreys	1057		
Labour	Harold Trace	764		
Labour	Sarah Wrightson	737		
Spelthorne Independent Party	Ann Ayers	517		
Spelthorne Independent Party	Juliet Griffin	398		
Spelthorne Independent Party	Kim Philips	394		
Majority				
Turnout				
Conservative hold		Swing		
Conservative hold		Swing		
Conservative hold		Swing		

Ashford North and Stanwell South (3 seats)
Party	Candidate	Votes	%	±%
Conservative	Sinead Mooney	1,361		
Conservative	Anne-Marie Neale	1,266		
Conservative	Joanne Sexton	1,183		
UKIP	Peter Appleford	1159		
Labour	John Doran	1017		
UKIP	Marian Rough	922		
Labour	Pamela Osborn	915		
Labour	Iain Raymond	792		
Greens	Gordon Douglas	394		
Spelthorne Independent Party	Simon Bhadye	262		
Spelthorne Independent Party	Teresa Flurry	244		
Liberal Democrats	Alan Mockford	244		
Majority				
Turnout				
Conservative gain from independent (politician)		Swing		
Conservative gain from independent (politician)		Swing		
Conservative hold		Swing		

Ashford Town (3 seats)
Party	Candidate	Votes	%	±%
Conservative	Nick Gething	1,926		
Conservative	Olivia Rybinski	1,451		
Conservative	Naz Islam	1,329		
UKIP	Susan Mason	1242		
Labour	John May	952		
Spelthorne Independent Party	Gerry Forsbrey	739		
Spelthorne Independent Party	Sam Budd	716		
Labour	Yazdi Merchant	710		
Greens	Rupert Jackson	683		
Majority				
Turnout				
Conservative gain from Independent		Swing		
Conservative gain from UKIP		Swing		
Conservative hold		Swing		

Halliford and Sunbury West (3 seats)
Party	Candidate	Votes	%	±%
Conservative	Timothy Evans	1,376		
Conservative	Anthony Jones	1,274		
Liberal Democrats	Sandra Dunn	1,141		
Conservative	Denise Turner-Stewart	1002		
Liberal Democrats	Christine Fisher	956		
UKIP	Teresa Darby	928		
Liberal Democrats	Tony Rawlison	839		
Labour	Sean Beatty	581		
Majority				
Turnout				
Conservative hold		Swing		
Conservative hold		Swing		
Liberal Democrats hold		Swing		

Laleham and Shepperton Green (3 seats)
Party	Candidate	Votes	%	±%
Conservative	Maureen Attewell	1,922		
Conservative	Richard Smith-Ainsley	1,586		
Conservative	Mary Madams	1,529		
UKIP	Brian Catt	1321		
Spelthorne Independent Party	David Furst	966		
Spelthorne Independent Party	Karen Howkins	959		
Labour	Malcolm Aw	675		
Liberal Democrats	Jon Edwards	640		
Labour	Pierre Cooper	581		
Labour	Arthur Gee	249		
TUSC	Helen Couchman	100		
TUSC	Andrew Pattinson	95		
TUSC	Paul Couchman	68		
Majority				
Turnout				
Conservative hold		Swing		
Conservative hold		Swing		
Conservative hold		Swing		

Riverside and Laleham (3 seats)
Party	Candidate	Votes	%	±%
Conservative	Tony Harman	2,203		
Conservative	Denise Saliagopoulos	2,184		
Conservative	Quentin Edgington	1,730		
UKIP	Linda Thatcher	881		
Labour	John Burrel	597		
Labour	Emma Yates	570		
Labour	Imtiaz Khan	403		
Greens	Elizabeth Mansfield	402		
Liberal Democrats	John Thesiger	342		
Greens	Steve Trafford	331		
Liberal Democrats	Elizabeth Scholefield	284		
Majority				
Turnout				
Conservative hold		Swing		
Conservative hold		Swing		
Conservative hold		Swing		

Shepperton Town (3 seats)
Party	Candidate	Votes	%	±%
Conservative	Robin Sider	2,502		
Conservative	Vivienne Leighton	2,121		
Conservative	Robert Watts	2,029		
UKIP	Jim Maxwell	823		
UKIP	Gerry Ring	656		
Labour	Stephen Bentley	612		
Labour	Jonathan Button	554		
Liberal Democrats	Tony Clench	532		
Labour	Jolyon Green	524		
Majority				
Turnout				
Conservative hold		Swing		
Conservative hold		Swing		
Conservative hold		Swing		

Staines (3 seats)
Party	Candidate	Votes	%	±%
Conservative	Colin Davis	1,642		
Conservative	Jean Pinkerton	1,610		
Conservative	Mark Francis	1,593		
Labour	David Arnold	1144		
Greens	Jenny Vinson	1045		
UKIP	Rod Price	905		
Spelthorne Independent Party	Alan Patterson	699		
Labour	Leonard Evans	673		
TUSC	Leanne Robertson	212		
Majority				
Turnout				
Conservative hold		Swing		
Conservative hold		Swing		
Conservative hold		Swing		

Staines South (3 seats)
Party	Candidate	Votes	%	±%
Conservative	Steven Burkmar	1,283		
Conservative	Sabine Lohmann	1,263		
Conservative	Penny Forbes-Forsyth	1,225		
UKIP	Christopher Beresford	989		
Labour	Amy Burrell	865		
UKIP	Gerald Gravett	854		
Labour	Mark Appleyard	829		
Labour	John Johnston	765		
UKIP	Dale Harris	745		
Liberal Democrats	Susan Vincent	336		
Liberal Democrats	Terry Lewis	306		
Liberal Democrats	Robert Johnson	249		
Majority				
Turnout				
Conservative hold		Swing		
Conservative hold		Swing		
Conservative hold		Swing		

Stanwell North (3 seats)
Party	Candidate	Votes	%	±%
Conservative	Kevin Flurry	1,183		
Conservative	Richard Barratt	1,177		
Labour	Susan Doran	1,149		
UKIP	Gillian Sanderson	1040		
UKIP	Reg Thorne	1031		
Conservative	Joshua Jogo	1026		
Labour	Andrew McLuskey	985		
Labour	John Went	804		
Greens	Paul Jacobs	409		
Majority				
Turnout				
Conservative hold		Swing		
Conservative hold		Swing		
Conservative hold		Swing		

Sunbury Common (3 seats)
Party	Candidate	Votes	%	±%
Liberal Democrats	Ian Beardsmore	1,297		
Conservative	Alison Griffiths	1,025		
Liberal Democrats	Bernie Spoor	1,002		
Conservative	Colin Barnard	992		
Conservative	Brian Stobbs	969		
UKIP	Mark Jenkins	966		
Liberal Democrats	Chris Bateson	931		
Labour	Khalid Mustafa	601		
Labour	John Norcross	585		
Majority				
Turnout				
Conservative gain from Liberal Democrats		Swing		
Liberal Democrats hold		Swing		
Liberal Democrats hold		Swing		

Sunbury East (3 seats)
Party	Candidate	Votes	%	±%
Conservative	Alfred Friday	1,885		
Conservative	Ian Harvey	1,683		
Conservative	Daxa Patel	1,539		
Liberal Democrats	Kathy Grant	1220		
Liberal Democrats	David Gardner	1176		
Liberal Democrats	Richard Dunn	1104		
UKIP	Mark Harrison	789		
Labour	Doreen Went	545		
Labour	Ian Jenkins	493		
Majority				
Turnout				
Conservative hold		Swing		
Conservative hold		Swing		
Conservative hold		Swing		
