= 2019 Spelthorne Borough Council election =

- 2 May 2019

All 39 seats to Spelthorne Borough Council 20 seats needed for a majority

	First party	Second party
Party	Conservative	Liberal Democrats
Last election	35	3
Seats after	23	8
Seat change	-12	+5
Popular vote	27,596	10,406
Percentage	46.3%	17.5%
Swing	-1.4%	+7.5%
	Third party	Fourth party
Party	Labour	Green
Last election	1	0
Seats after	4	2
Seat change	+3	+2
Popular vote	9,450	5,215
Percentage	15.9%	8.8%
Swing	-1.9%	+6.2%
- Results of the 2019 Spelthorne Borough Council election
Council control before election
Conservative
Council control after election
Conservative

The 2019 Spelthorne Borough Council election took place on 2 May 2019 to elect all members of Spelthorne Borough Council in England. The Conservatives retained control of the council, but with a reduced majority of 7, down from 31.

== Summary ==
=== Election result ===
2019 Spelthorne Borough Council election
Party	Candidates	Seats	Gains	Losses	Net gain/loss	Seats %	Votes %	Votes	+/−
Conservative	39	23	0	12	▼12	59.0	46.3	27,596	–1.4
Liberal Democrats	18	8	5	0	▲5	20.5	17.5	10,406	+7.5
Labour	21	4	4	0	▲3	10.3	15.9	9,450	–1.9
Green	8	2	2	0	▲2	5.1	8.8	5,215	+6.2
Independent	4	2	2	0	▲2	5.1	4.2	2,503	N/A
UKIP	13	0	0	0	Steady	0.0	7.4	4,378	–7.7

== Results by ward ==
=== Ashford Common ===
Ashford Common
Party	Candidate	Votes	%	±%
Conservative	Clare Barratt	891	51.6	
Conservative	Richard Barratt	805	46.6	
Conservative	Robert Noble	719	41.6	
Green	Anoma Jacobs	429	24.8	
UKIP	Adam Hack-Davies	408	23.6	
Liberal Democrats	Ian Clench	365	21.1	
Labour	Amy McWeeney	350	20.3	
Labour	Christopher Karamian	310	17.9	
Registered electors		6,377		
Turnout		1,728	27.1	
Rejected ballots		8	0.5	
Conservative hold		Swing		
Conservative hold		Swing		
Conservative hold		Swing		

=== Ashford East ===
Ashford East
Party	Candidate	Votes	%	±%
Conservative	John Boughtflower	816	46.9	
Conservative	Rose Chandler	780	44.8	
Conservative	Anthony Mitchell	740	42.5	
Green	Jill Beecher	496	28.5	
UKIP	Brian Catt	379	21.8	
Labour	Sarah Wrightson	369	21.2	
Labour	Ian Jenkins	368	21.1	
Liberal Democrats	Alexandra Dare	308	17.7	
Liberal Democrats	Michael Alexiou	272	15.6	
Registered electors		5,924		
Turnout		1,741	29.39	
Rejected ballots		13	0.7	
Conservative hold		Swing		
Conservative hold		Swing		
Conservative hold		Swing		

=== Ashford North and Stanwell South ===
Ashford North and Stanwell South
Party	Candidate	Votes	%	±%
Conservative	Joanne Sexton	760	43.9	
Conservative	Satvinder Buttar	690	39.9	
Conservative	Amar Brar	655	37.9	
Labour	Roger Bowen	613	35.4	
Labour	Rebecca Geach	611	35.3	
Labour	Tim Lobanov	555	32.1	
UKIP	Michael Pratt	432	25.0	
Registered electors		6,584		
Turnout		1,730	26.28	
Rejected ballots		19	1.1	
Conservative hold		Swing		
Conservative hold		Swing		
Conservative hold		Swing		

=== Ashford Town ===
Ashford Town
Party	Candidate	Votes	%	±%
Conservative	Nick Gething	988	48.9	
Conservative	Olivia Rybinski	896	44.4	
Conservative	Naz Islam	874	43.3	
Green	Malcolm Beecher	691	34.2	
Green	Rupert Jackson	641	31.7	
Labour	Tony Burrell	444	22.0	
Labour	Iain Raymond	354	17.5	
UKIP	Bob Berressem	324	16.0	
Registered electors		5,511		
Turnout		2,020	36.65	
Rejected ballots		14	0.7	
Conservative hold		Swing		
Conservative hold		Swing		
Conservative hold		Swing		

=== Halliford and Sunbury West ===
Halliford and Sunbury West
Party	Candidate	Votes	%	±%
Liberal Democrats	Sandra Dunn	976	54.0	
Liberal Democrats	Thomas Fidler	860	47.5	
Liberal Democrats	Lawrence Nichols	781	43.2	
Conservative	Anthony Jones	584	32.3	
Conservative	Buddhi Weerasinghe	525	29.0	
Conservative	Anna Nowicka	515	28.5	
UKIP	Shirley Jacobs	271	15.0	
Labour	Sean Beatty	210	11.6	
Registered electors		4,968		
Turnout		1,809	36.41	
Rejected ballots		14	0.8	
Liberal Democrats hold		Swing		
Liberal Democrats gain from Conservative		Swing		
Liberal Democrats gain from Conservative		Swing		

=== Laleham and Shepperton Green ===
Laleham and Shepperton Green
Party	Candidate	Votes	%	±%
Conservative	Maureen Attewell	911	51.6	
Conservative	Richard Smith-Ainsley	764	43.3	
Conservative	Mary Madams	731	41.4	
Green	Paul Jacobs	505	28.6	
Liberal Democrats	John Thesiger	417	23.6	
Liberal Democrats	Alan Mockford	399	22.6	
UKIP	Linda Thatcher	374	21.2	
Labour	Sue Bryer	361	20.4	
Registered electors		6,160		
Turnout		1,766	28.67	
Rejected ballots		7	0.4	
Conservative hold		Swing		
Conservative hold		Swing		
Conservative hold		Swing		

=== Riverside and Laleham ===
Riverside and Laleham
Party	Candidate	Votes	%	±%
Independent	Denise Saliagopoulos	935	48.1	
Conservative	Michele Gibson	748	38.5	
Conservative	Tony Harman	668	34.4	
Conservative	Howard Williams	544	28.0	
Liberal Democrats	Terrence Lewis	491	25.3	
Independent	Quentin Edgington	458	23.6	
Liberal Democrats	Gerald Dare	442	22.7	
Labour	John Johnston	374	19.2	
UKIP	Derek Sheppard	328	16.9	
Registered electors		5,370		
Turnout		1,944	36.2	
Rejected ballots		13	0.7	
Independent gain from Conservative		Swing		
Conservative hold		Swing		
Conservative hold		Swing		

=== Shepperton Town ===
Shepperton Town
Party	Candidate	Votes	%	±%
Conservative	Robin Sider	1,295	59.5	
Conservative	Vivienne Leighton	1,189	54.6	
Conservative	Colin Barnard	1,153	53.0	
Green	Peter Hughes	585	26.9	
Liberal Democrats	Robert Johnson	443	20.4	
Labour	Bethany Edwards	330	15.2	
UKIP	Gerry Ring	272	12.5	
Labour	Stephen Bentley	270	12.4	
Registered electors		5,480		
Turnout		2,176	39.71	
Rejected ballots		17	0.8	
Conservative hold		Swing		
Conservative hold		Swing		
Conservative hold		Swing		

=== Staines ===
Staines
Party	Candidate	Votes	%	±%
Green	Tom Lagden	978	52.3	
Green	Jan Doerfel	890	47.6	
Labour	Veena Sivagnanam	633	33.8	
Conservative	Mark Francis	630	33.7	
Conservative	Jean Pinkerton	623	33.3	
Conservative	Sinead Mooney	606	32.4	
UKIP	Gerald Gravett	297	15.9	
Registered electors		6,260		
Turnout		1,871	29.89	
Rejected ballots		10	0.5	
Green gain from Conservative		Swing		
Green gain from Conservative		Swing		
Labour gain from Conservative		Swing		

=== Staines South ===
Staines South
Party	Candidate	Votes	%	±%
Liberal Democrats	Christopher Bateson	821	49.8	
Liberal Democrats	Nichola Cornes	796	48.3	
Labour	Jennifer Vinson	490	29.8	
Conservative	Steven Burkmar	421	25.6	
UKIP	Chris Beresford	420	25.5	
Conservative	Sabine Capes	383	23.3	
Conservative	Richard Smith	383	23.3	
Registered electors		5,424		
Turnout		1,647	30.37	
Rejected ballots		18	1.1	
Liberal Democrats gain from Conservative		Swing		
Liberal Democrats gain from Conservative		Swing		
Labour gain from Conservative		Swing		

=== Stanwell North ===
Stanwell North
Party	Candidate	Votes	%	±%
Labour	Sue Doran	729	44.6	
Labour	John Doran	689	42.2	
Conservative	Jim McIlroy	649	39.7	
Labour	Jon Button	594	36.4	
Conservative	Katie Barratt	521	31.9	
Conservative	Joshua Jogo	427	26.1	
UKIP	Marilyn Thomas	326	20.0	
Registered electors		5,956		
Turnout		1,633	27.42	
Rejected ballots		16	1.0	
Labour hold		Swing		
Labour gain from Conservative		Swing		
Conservative hold		Swing		

=== Sunbury Common ===
Sunbury Common
Party	Candidate	Votes	%	±%
Independent	Ian Beardsmore*	803	46.8	
Liberal Democrats	Bernie Spoor	609	35.5	
Liberal Democrats	Richard Dunn	540	31.5	
Conservative	Alison Griffiths	507	29.5	
Liberal Democrats	John Turner	372	21.7	
Labour	Eric Ollington	343	20.0	
Conservative	Nicola Molnar	329	19.2	
Conservative	Alex Sapunovas	311	18.1	
Independent	Chris Frazer	307	17.9	
UKIP	Betty Sutton	267	15.6	
Registered electors		5,984		
Turnout		1,717	28.69	
Rejected ballots		5	0.3	
Independent gain from Conservative		Swing		
Liberal Democrats hold		Swing		
Liberal Democrats hold		Swing		

- Ian Beardsmore was elected as a Liberal Democrat in 2015.

=== Sunbury East ===
Sunbury East
Party	Candidate	Votes	%	±%
Conservative	Helen Harvey	897	48.2	
Conservative	Ian Harvey	881	47.3	
Liberal Democrats	Kathleen Grant	799	42.9	
Conservative	Daxa Patel	787	42.3	
Liberal Democrats	Anthony Rawlinson	715	38.4	
Labour	John May	398	21.4	
UKIP	Timothy Digby	280	15.0	
Registered electors		5,717		
Turnout		1,862	32.57	
Rejected ballots		15	0.8	
Conservative hold		Swing		
Conservative hold		Swing		
Liberal Democrats gain from Conservative		Swing		

== Changes 2019–2023 ==
The 2 May 2019 Spelthorne Borough Council elections resulted in 23 Conservative seats, 8 Liberal Democrat seats, four Labour seats, two Green Party seats and two Independents. The Conservative Party thus maintained their overwhelming majority on the council.

- 9 June 2020: 6 Conservative councillors, including council leader Ian Harvey and deputy leader Olivia Rybinski, resigned from the Conservative Party and created the new United Spelthorne Group on the council. With the Conservatives now having fewer than half of all seats on the council, the borough was now in "no overall control", leaving the Conservative Party without a governing majority for the first time in the borough's history.
- 25 June 2020: John Boughtflower was elected as leader of the council and Jim McIlroy as his deputy.
- February 2021: Joanne Sexton and Richard Smith-Ainsley left the United Spelthorne Group, citing differences over its approach to governance, and formed the new Independent Spelthorne Group.
- 27 May 2021: Lawrence Nichols (Liberal Democrats) was elected as leader and Joanne Sexton (Independent) as his deputy.
- 8 March 2022: Veena Silva and Jenny Vinson, elected as Labour, disbanded the Independent Labour group to join the Breakthrough Party.
- March 2022: Bob Noble left the Conservative Party to sit as an independent.
- May 2022: Michele Gibson left the Conservative Party to sit as an independent, before formally joining the Liberal Democrats on 24 March 2023.
- 26 May 2022: John Boughtflower was elected as leader of the council, defeating Independent Spelthorne Group leader Joanne Sexton by one vote with the support of the United Spelthorne Group, and Tony Mitchell was elected his deputy.

=== By-elections ===
==== Staines South ====
Staines South: 6 May 2021
Party	Candidate	Votes	%	±%
Conservative	Sinead Mooney	675	36.6	+11.0
Liberal Democrats	Rob Millist	668	36.2	−13.6
Labour	Harriet Digby	319	17.3	−12.5
Independent	Lesley Connor	154	8.3	New
TUSC	Paul Couchman	30	1.6	New
Majority		7	0.4	N/A
Turnout		1,846		
Conservative gain from Liberal Democrats		Swing	▲12.3	

The by-election was triggered by the resignation of Liberal Democrat councillor Nichola Cornes.

==== Staines ====
Staines: 22 July 2021
Party	Candidate	Votes	%	±%
Green	Malcolm Beecher	651	44.0	+5.5
Conservative	Michael Zenonos	486	32.8	+8.0
Independent	Paul West	275	18.6	New
TUSC	Paul Couchman	39	2.6	New
Reform	Gerald Gravett	29	2.0	New
Majority		165	11.1	
Registered electors		6,441		
Turnout		1,480	23	
Rejected ballots		5	0.3	
Green hold		Swing	▼1.3	

The by-election was triggered by the resignation of Green Party councillor Jan Doerfel on 7 June 2021, in protest at the council's plans to release green belt land for development.

==== Stanwell North ====
Stanwell North: 23 February 2022
Party	Candidate	Votes	%	±%
Labour	Jon Button	605	48.8	+12.4
Conservative	Michael Zenonos	567	45.7	+6.0
TUSC	Paul Dennis Couchman	69	5.6	New
Majority		38	3.1	
Turnout		1,241	21.1	
Labour gain from Conservative		Swing	▲3.2	

The by-election was triggered by the departure of Conservative councillor Jim McIlroy, who left the council in late 2021.

==== Laleham and Shepperton Green ====
Laleham and Shepperton Green: 25 May 2022
Party	Candidate	Votes	%	±%
Green	Stuart Whitmore	903	51.7	
Conservative	Karen Howkins	775	44.4	
TUSC	Paul Couchman	69	3.9	
Majority		128	7.3	
Turnout		1,747	28.21	
Green gain from Conservative		Swing		

The by-election was triggered by the death of Conservative councillor Mary Madams, a former mayor of Spelthorne and councillor for the ward since 2003.

==== Laleham and Shepperton Green ====
Laleham and Shepperton Green: 11 August 2022
Party	Candidate	Votes	%	±%
Conservative	Karen Howkins	810	55.5	
Liberal Democrats	John Thesiger	578	39.6	
TUSC	Paul Couchman	71	4.9	
Majority		232	15.9	
Turnout		1,459	23.6	
Conservative gain from Independent		Swing		

The by-election was triggered by the death of Richard Smith-Ainsley, deputy leader of the Independent Spelthorne Group, who had represented the ward since 1995 and left the Conservative Party in June 2020.
