= Watford Borough Council elections =

Local government elections in Hertfordshire, England

Watford Borough Council elections are held three years out of every four, to elect members of Watford Borough Council in Hertfordshire, England. A third of the council is elected each time. Since the last boundary changes in 2016 the council has comprised 36 councillors representing 12 wards, each of which elects three councillors. In addition to the 36 councillors Watford also has a directly-elected mayor. Elections to Hertfordshire County Council are held in the fourth year of the cycle when there are no borough council elections.

== Council elections ==
Composition of the council
Year	Labour	Conservative	Liberal Democrats (Note: Includes totals for the predecessors of the Liberal Democrats, the Liberal Party and SDP (both of which participated in the Alliance).)	Green (Note: Includes totals for the predecessors of the Green Party of England and Wales, the Ecology Party and Green Party UK.)	Independents & Others	Council control after election
Local government reorganisation; council established (36 seats)
1973	21	9	6	–	0	Labour
New ward boundaries (36 seats)
1976	19	17	0	0	0	Labour
1978	19	17	0	0	0	Labour
1979	19	17	0	0	0	Labour
1980	22	14	0	0	0	Labour
1982	23	13	0	0	0	Labour
1983	23	13	0	0	0	Labour
1984	23	13	0	0	0	Labour
1986	23	12	0	0	1	Labour
1987	23	10	3	0	0	Labour
1988	16	11	3	0	6	No overall control
1990	20	11	3	0	2	Labour
1991	22	10	3	0	1	Labour
1992	22	10	4	0	0	Labour
1994	20	9	7	0	0	Labour
1995	21	8	7	0	0	Labour
1996	21	6	9	0	0	Labour
1998	21	7	8	0	0	Labour
New ward boundaries (36 seats)
1999	19	7	10	0	0	Labour
2000	18	8	10	0	0	No overall control
2002	15	7	13	0	1	No overall control
2003	8	7	20	1	0	Liberal Democrats
2004	4	4	26	2	0	Liberal Democrats
2006	1	3	29	3	0	Liberal Democrats
2007	2	3	28	3	0	Liberal Democrats
2008	3	3	27	3	0	Liberal Democrats
2010	4	4	25	3	0	Liberal Democrats
2011	6	2	24	3	1	Liberal Democrats
2012	8	2	23	3	0	Liberal Democrats
2014	11	1	23	1	0	Liberal Democrats
2015	13	5	18	0	0	No overall control
New ward boundaries (36 seats)
2016	11	0	25	0	0	Liberal Democrats
2018	10	0	26	0	0	Liberal Democrats
2019	10	0	26	0	0	Liberal Democrats
2021	10	0	26	0	0	Liberal Democrats
2022	9	0	27	0	0	Liberal Democrats
2023	9	0	27	0	0	Liberal Democrats
2024	6	0	30	0	0	Liberal Democrats
2026	4	0	32	0	0	Liberal Democrats

== Results maps ==
2002 results map

2003 results map

2004 results map

2006 results map

2007 results map

2008 results map

2010 results map

2011 results map

2012 results map

2014 results map

2015 results map

2016 results map

2018 results map

2019 results map

2021 results map

2022 results map

2023 results map

2024 results map

2026 results map

== By-election results ==
=== 1994–1998 ===
Meriden By-Election 1 May 1997
Party	Candidate	Votes	%	±%
Labour		3,768	48.2	−14.1
Conservative		2,473	31.7	+9.8
Liberal Democrats		1,570	20.1	+4.3
Majority		1,295	16.5	
Turnout		7,811		
Labour hold		Swing		

Nascot Park By-Election 1 May 1997
Party	Candidate	Votes	%	±%
Conservative		3,695	50.0	+1.7
Liberal Democrats		1,963	26.6	+4.9
Labour		1,727	23.4	−6.7
Majority		1,732	23.4	
Turnout		7,385		
Conservative hold		Swing		

=== 1998–2002 ===
Holywell By-Election 7 June 2001
Party	Candidate	Votes	%	±%
Labour		1,447	51.1	+7.3
Liberal Democrats		906	32.0	+2.1
Conservative		477	16.9	−1.9
Majority		541	19.1	
Turnout		2,830		
Labour hold		Swing		

Tudor By-Election 7 June 2001
Party	Candidate	Votes	%	±%
Labour		1,260	42.5	+1.3
Conservative		1,011	34.1	−7.6
Liberal Democrats		467	15.8	−1.3
Independent		116	3.9	+3.9
Green		112	3.8	+3.8
Majority		249	8.4	
Turnout		2,966		
Labour hold		Swing		

Vicarage By-Election 7 June 2001
Party	Candidate	Votes	%	±%
Labour		1,691	56.9	+0.9
Conservative		674	22.7	+1.3
Liberal Democrats		607	20.4	−2.2
Majority		1,017	34.2	
Turnout		2,972		
Labour hold		Swing		

=== 2002–2006 ===
Oxhey By-Election 20 June 2002
Party	Candidate	Votes	%	±%
Liberal Democrats	Shirena Counter	1,024	72.4	+5.0
Conservative	Alan Luto	245	17.3	−1.5
Labour	Ngagbogu Akubue	105	7.4	−3.2
Green	Faye Cullen	40	2.8	−0.4
Majority		779	55.1	
Turnout		1,414	28.8	
Liberal Democrats hold		Swing		

=== 2006–2010 ===
Nascot By-Election 15 June 2006
Party	Candidate	Votes	%	±%
Liberal Democrats	Mark Watkin	887	45.4	+17.4
Conservative	Angela Basit	828	42.4	−12.0
Green	Sally Ivins	145	7.4	+1.3
Labour	Mohammed Riaz	92	4.7	−6.9
Majority		59	3.0	
Turnout		1,952	36.6	
Liberal Democrats gain from Conservative		Swing		

Tudor By-Election 16 October 2008
Party	Candidate	Votes	%	±%
Liberal Democrats	Darren Walford	932	50.0	+3.1
Conservative	Richard Southern	486	26.1	−12.4
Labour	Mark Xerri	273	14.6	+4.0
Green	Helen Wynne	91	4.9	+0.9
BNP	Guy Dickens	83	4.5	+4.5
Majority		446	23.9	
Turnout		1,865	40.83	
Liberal Democrats hold		Swing		

Leggatts By-Election 4 June 2009
Party	Candidate	Votes	%	±%
Conservative	Stephen Johnson	534	27.1	
Liberal Democrats	Malcolm Adcock	489	24.8	
Green	Maria Green	463	23.5	
Labour	Ahsan Khan	438	22.2	
Majority		45	2.3	
Turnout		1969	36.6	
Conservative gain from Liberal Democrats		Swing		

=== 2010–2014 ===
Central By-Election 14 October 2010
Party	Candidate	Votes	%	±%
Liberal Democrats	Helen Lynch	696	44.1	+7.3
Labour	Fred Grindrod	622	39.4	+4.8
Conservative	Youseffe Fahmy	158	10.0	−12.2
Green	Dorothy Nixon	79	5.0	−1.4
UKIP	Dan Channing	24	1.5	+1.5
Majority		74	4.7	
Turnout		1,579		
Liberal Democrats hold		Swing		

Nascot By-Election 29 September 2011
Party	Candidate	Votes	%	±%
Liberal Democrats	Jeanette Aron	1,021	48.5	+2.9
Conservative	Penny Edwards	818	38.8	+2.5
Labour	Omar Ismail	134	6.4	−5.3
Green	Sally Ivins	133	6.3	−0.1
Majority		203	9.6	
Turnout		2,106		
Liberal Democrats hold		Swing		

Vicarage By-Election 6 October 2011
Party	Candidate	Votes	%	±%
Labour	Maureen Joan Mills	917	52.9	+2.8
Liberal Democrats	Philip Granville Gough	403	23.2	−4.3
Independent	Mohammad Azam	190	11.0	+11.0
Independent	Paul Baker	129	7.4	−0.7
Conservative	David Charles Ealey	95	5.5	−3.7
Majority		514	29.6	
Turnout		1,734		
Labour hold		Swing		

Central By-Election 12 November 2012
Party	Candidate	Votes	%	±%
Liberal Democrats	Lizz Ayre	716	45.9	−1.7
Labour	Avril Haley	550	35.3	+4.3
Conservative	Binita Mehta	151	9.7	−1.1
Green	Su Murray	83	5.3	−0.9
UKIP	Renie Price	59	3.8	−0.6
Majority		166	10.6	
Turnout		1,559		
Liberal Democrats hold		Swing		

Woodside By-Election 2 May 2013
Party	Candidate	Votes	%	±%
Liberal Democrats	Glen Saffery	487	37.2	−7.4
Conservative	Tony Rogers	292	22.3	−8.8
UKIP	Philip Cox	277	21.1	+21.1
Labour	Omar Ashraf	212	16.2	−0.7
Green	Alison Wiesner	42	3.2	−4.1
Majority		195	14.9	
Turnout		1,310		
Liberal Democrats hold		Swing		

=== 2014–2018 ===
Leggatts By-Election 4 May 2017
Party	Candidate	Votes	%	±%
Labour	Richard Smith	934	44.1	−0.6
Liberal Democrats	Helen Lynch	762	36.0	+19.2
Conservative	Camilla Khawaja	318	15.0	−4.5
Green	Su Murray	104	4.9	−9.7
Majority		172	8.1	
Turnout		2,118		
Labour hold		Swing		

Oxhey By-Election 4 May 2017
Party	Candidate	Votes	%	±%
Liberal Democrats	Maggie Parker	1,239	64.7	+6.7
Conservative	Richard Bell	395	20.6	+6.9
Labour	Sue Sleeman	281	14.7	−0.3
Majority		844	44.1	
Turnout		1,915		
Liberal Democrats hold		Swing		

Park By-Election 4 May 2017
Party	Candidate	Votes	%	±%
Liberal Democrats	Peter Jeffree	1,430	54.7	+10.1
Conservative	David Fallon	915	35.0	+1.6
Labour	Junior Sesay	267	10.2	−1.2
Majority		515	19.7	
Turnout		2,612		
Liberal Democrats hold		Swing		

=== 2018–2022 ===
Oxhey By-Election 21 June 2018
Party	Candidate	Votes	%	±%
Liberal Democrats	Imran Hamid	828	55.3	−3.5
Conservative	Joseph Gornicki	420	28.1	+4.7
Labour	Sue Sleeman	248	16.6	−1.1
Majority		408	27.3	
Turnout		1,496		
Liberal Democrats hold		Swing		

Tudor By-Election 10 October 2019
Party	Candidate	Votes	%	±%
Liberal Democrats	Bill Stanton	871	55.4	−5.6
Conservative	Carly Bishop	490	31.2	+13.2
Labour	Seamus Williams	210	13.4	−7.5
Majority		381	24.3	
Turnout		1,571		
Liberal Democrats hold		Swing		

=== 2022–2026 ===
Held alongside the 2025 Hertfordshire County Council election.

Holywell by-election: 1 May 2025
Party	Candidate	Votes	%	±%
Labour	Asma Suleman	573	33.0	−27.1
Liberal Democrats	Callum Robertson	532	30.6	+12.4
Reform	David Ealey	294	16.9	N/A
Conservative	Sanjaya Pant	180	10.3	−6.7
Green	Jake Mitchell	126	7.2	N/A
TUSC	Mark O'Connor	23	1.3	−3.4
Majority		41		
Turnout			23.4	
Labour hold		Swing		

Oxhey by-election: 1 May 2025
Party	Candidate	Votes	%	±%
Liberal Democrats	Iain Sharpe	1,061	60.7	
Reform	Michael Barrett	302	17.2	
Conservative	Peter Williams	136	7.7	
Labour	Sonu Masania	132	7.5	
Green	David Gordon	99	5.6	
TUSC	James O'Connor	10	0.5	
Majority		759		
Turnout			30.6	
Liberal Democrats hold		Swing		

Held following the resignation of the incumbent councillor.

Tudor by-election: 4 December 2025
Party	Candidate	Votes	%	±%
Liberal Democrats	Callum Robertson	821	51.6	+4.3
Reform	Mark Dixon	433	27.2	+17.8
Conservative	Danny Mosley	148	9.3	−10.5
Labour	Seamus Williams	111	7.0	−16.4
Green	Dave Dunckley	77	4.8	New
Majority		388		
Turnout		1590	30.49%	
Registered electors				
Liberal Democrats hold		Swing		
