= 2027 Watford Borough Council election =

2027 English local government election

- 6 May 2027

12 out of 36 seats to Watford Borough Council 19 seats needed for a majority
Leader	Peter Taylor	Nigel Bell
Party	Liberal Democrats	Labour
Leader's seat	Mayor	Holywell
Last election	32 seats, 44.8%	4 seats, 12.1%
Current seats	32	4
Incumbent Mayor
Peter Taylor
Liberal Democrats

The 2027 Watford Borough Council election will be held on 6 May 2027 to elect members of Watford Borough Council in Hertfordshire, England. This will be on the same day as other local elections held across the United Kingdom.

== Background ==
=== Local government reorganisation ===
Due to proposed structural changes to local government in England, the 2026 election was intended to be the final election to the council before it was abolished and replaced by South West Hertfordshire Council, a new unitary authority. However, on 7 September 2026, the government announced it was withdrawing plans for the planned restructuring pending review. Following this announcement, local elections due to be held in 2027 under the existing local electoral calendar would proceed.

== Summary ==
=== Election result ===
2027 Watford Borough Council election
Party	This election				Full council			This election		
Party	Candidates	Seats	Net	Seats %	Other	Total	Total %	Votes	Votes %	+/−
Liberal Democrats					23					
Labour					1					

=== Incumbents ===
Ward	Incumbent councillor	Affiliation	Re-standing
Callowland	Dawn Allen-Williamson	Liberal Democrats	
Central	Rabi Martins	Liberal Democrats	
Holywell	Favour Ezeifedi	Labour	
Leggatts	Asif Khan	Labour	
Meriden	Amanda Grimston	Liberal Democrats	
Nascot	Mark Hofman	Liberal Democrats	
Oxhey	Iain Sharpe	Liberal Democrats	
Park	Penelope Hill	Liberal Democrats	
Stanborough	Tim Williams	Liberal Democrats	
Tudor	Callum Robertson	Liberal Democrats	
Vicarage	Jagtar Dhindsa	Labour	
Woodside	Richard Wenham	Liberal Democrats	
