= 2023 Watford Borough Council election =

2023 English local election

| ← 2022 | 4 May 2023 | 2024 → |

12 out of 36 seats to Watford Borough Council 19 seats needed for a majority

| | First party | Second party |
|---|---|---|
| Leader | Peter Taylor (Note: Peter Taylor being directly-elected mayor (position not up for election in 2023); Jennifer Pattinson group leader) | Nigel Bell |
| Party | Liberal Democrats | Labour |
| Last election | 27 seats, 51.3% | 9 seats, 27.9% |
| Seats before | 27 | 9 |
- Winner of each seat at the 2023 Watford Borough Council election
Council control before election
Liberal Democrats
Council control after election
Liberal Democrats

The 2023 Watford Borough Council election took place on 4 May 2023 to elect members of Watford Borough Council in Hertfordshire, England. This was on the same day as other local elections across England. There were 12 of the 36 seats up for election, being the usual third of the council.

The Liberal Democrats retained their majority on the council.

== Summary ==
=== Election result ===
2023 Watford Borough Council election
| Party | This election | | | Full council | | | This election | | |
| Party | Seats | Net | Seats % | Other | Total | Total % | Votes | Votes % | +/− |
|---|---|---|---|---|---|---|---|---|---|
| Liberal Democrats | 9 | Steady | 75.0 | 18 | 27 | 75.0 | 10,611 | 48.8 | –2.5 |
| Labour | 3 | Steady | 25.0 | 6 | 9 | 25.0 | 6,695 | 30.8 | +2.9 |
| Conservative | 0 | Steady | 0.0 | 0 | 0 | 0.0 | 3,805 | 17.5 | –2.1 |
| Reform UK | 0 | Steady | 0.0 | 0 | 0 | 0.0 | 447 | 2.1 | +1.9 |
| Heritage | 0 | Steady | 0.0 | 0 | 0 | 0.0 | 66 | 0.3 | N/A |
| Green | 0 | Steady | 0.0 | 0 | 0 | 0.0 | 52 | 0.2 | N/A |
| TUSC | 0 | Steady | 0.0 | 0 | 0 | 0.0 | 82 | 0.4 | ±0.0 |

== Ward results ==
The Statement of Persons Nominated, which details the candidates standing in each ward, was released by Watford Borough Council following the close of nominations on 5 April 2023. The results for each ward were:

=== Callowland ===
Callowland
| Party | Candidate | Votes | % | ±% |
|---|---|---|---|---|
| Liberal Democrats | Dawn Allen-Williamson* | 899 | 47.7 | −5.9 |
| Labour | Asma Suleman | 760 | 40.3 | +4.2 |
| Conservative | Nav Deep | 227 | 12.0 | +1.7 |
| Majority | | | | |
| Turnout | | 1,886 | | |
| Registered electors | | | | |
| Liberal Democrats hold | | Swing | | |

=== Central ===
Central
| Party | Candidate | Votes | % | ±% |
|---|---|---|---|---|
| Liberal Democrats | Rabi Martins* | 1,002 | 53.6 | −1.8 |
| Labour | Mo Wadud Hakim | 585 | 31.3 | +4.7 |
| Conservative | Sahil Ghuman | 177 | 9.5 | −1.7 |
| Reform UK | David Ealey | 104 | 5.6 | N/A |
| Majority | | | | |
| Turnout | | 1,868 | | |
| Registered electors | | | | |
| Liberal Democrats hold | | Swing | | |

=== Holywell ===
Holywell
| Party | Candidate | Votes | % | ±% |
|---|---|---|---|---|
| Labour | Favour Ezeifedi* | 960 | 57.3 | +4.1 |
| Liberal Democrats | Gabriel Duduta | 335 | 20.0 | −0.2 |
| Conservative | Sanjaya Pant | 323 | 19.3 | −4.6 |
| TUSC | Mark O'Connor | 58 | 3.5 | +0.8 |
| Majority | | | | |
| Turnout | | 1,676 | | |
| Registered electors | | | | |
| Labour hold | | Swing | | |

=== Leggatts ===
Leggatts
| Party | Candidate | Votes | % | ±% |
|---|---|---|---|---|
| Labour Co-op | Asif Khan* | 882 | 45.6 | +8.9 |
| Liberal Democrats | Jamil Minhas | 665 | 34.4 | −9.9 |
| Conservative | James Fanning | 297 | 15.4 | −1.1 |
| Heritage | Sarah Knott | 66 | 3.4 | N/A |
| TUSC | Derek Foster | 24 | 1.2 | −1.3 |
| Majority | | | | |
| Turnout | | 1,934 | | |
| Registered electors | | | | |
| Labour hold | | Swing | | |

=== Meriden ===
Meriden
| Party | Candidate | Votes | % | ±% |
|---|---|---|---|---|
| Liberal Democrats | Amanda Grimston* | 628 | 49.8 | −4.0 |
| Labour | Helena Farrington | 327 | 25.9 | +1.6 |
| Conservative | Jennie Raperport | 307 | 24.3 | +2.3 |
| Majority | | | | |
| Turnout | | 1,262 | | |
| Registered electors | | | | |
| Liberal Democrats hold | | Swing | | |

=== Nascot ===
Nascot
| Party | Candidate | Votes | % | ±% |
|---|---|---|---|---|
| Liberal Democrats | Mark Hofman* | 1,280 | 57.5 | −2.1 |
| Conservative | Ravi Kura | 485 | 21.8 | −2.3 |
| Labour | Edward Tunnah | 336 | 15.1 | −1.2 |
| Reform UK | Gary Ling | 125 | 5.6 | N/A |
| Majority | | | | |
| Turnout | | 2,226 | | |
| Registered electors | | | | |
| Liberal Democrats hold | | Swing | | |

=== Oxhey ===
Oxhey
| Party | Candidate | Votes | % | ±% |
|---|---|---|---|---|
| Liberal Democrats | Chris Newstead | 1,275 | 67.2 | +1.4 |
| Conservative | William Hickey | 339 | 17.9 | +0.8 |
| Labour | Sue Sleeman | 241 | 12.7 | −2.6 |
| Reform UK | Neal Webber | 43 | 2.3 | +0.5 |
| Majority | | | | |
| Turnout | | 1,898 | | |
| Registered electors | | | | |
| Liberal Democrats hold | | Swing | | |

=== Park ===
Park
| Party | Candidate | Votes | % | ±% |
|---|---|---|---|---|
| Liberal Democrats | Penelope Hill | 1,441 | 60.4 | −0.7 |
| Conservative | Arijit Mukherjee | 458 | 19.2 | −2.5 |
| Labour | Laura Griffiths | 375 | 15.7 | −1.6 |
| Reform UK | John Dowdle | 111 | 4.7 | N/A |
| Majority | | | | |
| Turnout | | 2,385 | | |
| Registered electors | | | | |
| Liberal Democrats hold | | Swing | | |

=== Stanborough ===
Stanborough
| Party | Candidate | Votes | % | ±% |
|---|---|---|---|---|
| Liberal Democrats | Tim Williams* | 928 | 57.9 | +7.1 |
| Conservative | Peter Williams | 283 | 17.7 | −11.9 |
| Labour | Terence Butler | 276 | 17.2 | −2.3 |
| Reform UK | Michael Hall | 64 | 4.0 | N/A |
| Green | James Willis | 52 | 3.2 | N/A |
| Majority | | | | |
| Turnout | | 1,603 | | |
| Registered electors | | | | |
| Liberal Democrats hold | | Swing | | |

=== Tudor ===
Tudor
| Party | Candidate | Votes | % | ±% |
|---|---|---|---|---|
| Liberal Democrats | Charlott Saunders | 852 | 52.3 | +2.1 |
| Conservative | Carly Bishop | 436 | 26.7 | +2.5 |
| Labour | Malcolm Bush | 342 | 21.0 | −4.6 |
| Majority | | | | |
| Turnout | | 1,630 | | |
| Registered electors | | | | |
| Liberal Democrats hold | | Swing | | |

=== Vicarage ===
Vicarage
| Party | Candidate | Votes | % | ±% |
|---|---|---|---|---|
| Labour | Jagtar Dhindsa* | 1,151 | 59.6 | +9.2 |
| Liberal Democrats | Bobby Amin | 575 | 29.8 | −8.6 |
| Conservative | Octavian Chirila Filip | 205 | 10.6 | −0.6 |
| Majority | | | | |
| Turnout | | 1,931 | | |
| Registered electors | | | | |
| Labour hold | | Swing | | |

=== Woodside ===
Woodside
| Party | Candidate | Votes | % | ±% |
|---|---|---|---|---|
| Liberal Democrats | Richard Wenham* | 731 | 50.1 | −1.1 |
| Labour | Anne Joynes | 460 | 31.5 | +6.8 |
| Conservative | Matthew Cawthorne | 268 | 18.4 | −5.4 |
| Majority | | | | |
| Turnout | | 1,459 | | |
| Registered electors | | | | |
| Liberal Democrats hold | | Swing | | |
