= 2026 Watford mayoral election =

Local election in England

- 7 May 2026
- Registered: 75,122
- Turnout: 37.2% (▲4.5 pp)
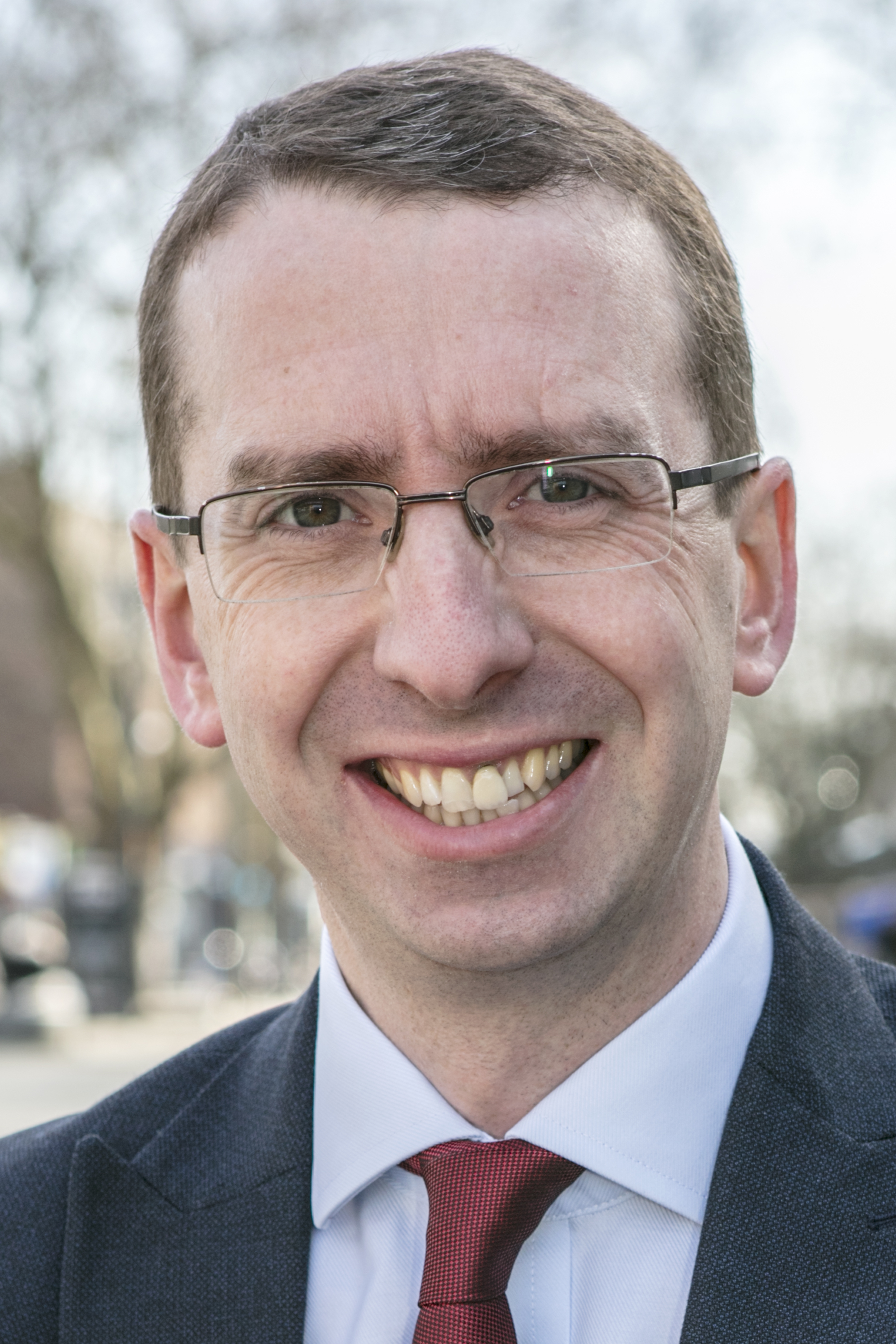
	First party	Second party	Third party
		Ref	Grn
Candidate	Peter Taylor	Mark Dixon	Jake Mitchell
Party	Liberal Democrats	Reform	Green
Last election	54.8%	Did not run	Did not run
Popular vote	14,583	4,972	3,084
Percentage	52.5%	17.9%	11.1%
Swing	▼2.3pp	New	New
Mayor before election
Peter Taylor
Liberal Democrats
Elected Mayor
Peter Taylor
Liberal Democrats

The 2026 Watford mayoral election was held on 7 May 2026 to elect the mayor of Watford, on the same date as the Watford local council election and other local elections across the country.

Incumbent mayor Peter Taylor of the Liberal Democrats was re-elected for his third term with a majority of 9,611 votes. Mark Dixon of Reform UK finished in second, while Green Party candidate Jake Mitchell finished third.

== Background ==
The position of Mayor of Watford was established in 2002. It was held by Dorothy Thornhill of the Liberal Democrats until 2018 when fellow Liberal Democrat Peter Taylor was elected to succeed her. In the 2022 mayoral election, Taylor was re-elected with over 50% of the vote.

== Electoral system ==
The election uses the voting system of first past the post to elect the mayor, having been changed from the supplementary vote system in 2022. In first past the post, there is only one count, and the candidate with the most votes wins. The Electoral Reform Society described the move to first past the post as one lowering the bar for politicians and thus damaging British democracy.

== Results ==
2026 Watford mayoral election
Party	Candidate	Votes	%	±%
Liberal Democrats	Peter Taylor	14,583	52.5	−2.3
Reform	Mark Dixon	4,972	17.9	New
Green	Jake Mitchell	3,084	11.1	New
Labour	Keith Morgan	2,742	9.9	−16.6
Conservative	Abdul Laskar	1,915	6.9	−11.8
UK Voice	Ketankumar Pipaliya	280	1.0	New
Independent	Ryan Bonar	192	0.7	New
Majority		9,611	34.6	+28.3
Turnout		27,768	37.2	+4.5
Registered electors		75,122		
Liberal Democrats hold		Swing	–2.3	
