= 2002 Watford Borough Council election =

2002 UK local government election

Results of the 2002 Watford Borough Council election

The 2002 Watford Borough Council elections were held on 2 May 2002. One third of the council was up for election and the council stayed under no overall control. At the same time an election for a directly elected mayor was held, which was won by the Liberal Democrat Dorothy Thornhill.

After the election, the composition of the council was:

- Labour 15
- Liberal Democrat 13
- Conservative 7
- Independent 1

== Election result ==
2002 Watford Borough Council election
Party	Seats	Gains	Losses	Net gain/loss	Seats %	Votes %	Votes	+/−
Liberal Democrats	6			+3	50.0	43.9	10,021	
Labour	4			-3	33.3	24.2	5,527	
Conservative	2			+1	16.7	25.6	5,837	
Green	0			0	0	3.9	886	
Independent	0			-1	0	2.2	492	
Socialist Alliance	0			0	0	0.3	60	

== Ward results ==
Callowland
Party	Candidate	Votes	%	±%
Labour	Daniel Scott	488	32.8	
Liberal Democrats	Paul Salter	466	31.3	
Green	Stephen Rackett	284	19.1	
Conservative	Carl Robertson	249	16.7	
Majority		22	1.5	
Turnout		1,487		

Central
Party	Candidate	Votes	%	±%
Liberal Democrats	Christopher Leslie	853	49.1	
Labour	John Dowdle	616	35.4	
Conservative	Shirley Hugill	176	10.1	
Green	Christine Stockwel	93	5.4	
Majority		237	13.7	
Turnout		1,738		

Holywell
Party	Candidate	Votes	%	±%
Liberal Democrats	Janet Baddeley	1,025	56.9	
Labour	Steven Palmer	568	31.6	
Conservative	David Ealey	147	8.2	
Socialist Alliance	Andrew O'Brien	60	3.3	
Majority		457	25.3	
Turnout		1,800		

Leggatts
Party	Candidate	Votes	%	±%
Labour	Keith Crout	691	36.0	
Conservative	Sally Punter	650	33.9	
Liberal Democrats	Jonathan Wyatt	519	27.0	
Green	Carol Skinner	59	3.1	
Majority		41	2.1	
Turnout		1,919		

Meriden
Party	Candidate	Votes	%	±%
Labour	Geoffrey O'Connell	613	37.2	
Liberal Democrats	Susan Greenslade	575	34.9	
Conservative	Pamela Bell	460	27.9	
Majority		38	2.3	
Turnout		1,648		

Nascot
Party	Candidate	Votes	%	±%
Conservative	Robert Gordon	1,101	47.8	
Liberal Democrats	Timothy Wyatt	709	30.8	
Independent	Janice Brown	492	21.4	
Majority		392	17.0	
Turnout		2,302		

Oxhey
Party	Candidate	Votes	%	±%
Liberal Democrats	Iain Sharpe	1,481	67.4	
Conservative	Alan Luto	414	18.8	
Labour	Nnagbogu Akubue	232	10.6	
Green	Andrew McBean	71	3.2	
Majority		1,067	48.6	
Turnout		2,198		

Park
Party	Candidate	Votes	%	±%
Conservative	Timothy Williams	1,207	51.6	
Liberal Democrats	Mark Crowne	795	34.0	
Labour	Frances Hince	256	10.9	
Green	Elaine Edwards	80	3.4	
Majority		412	17.6	
Turnout		2,338		

Stanborough
Party	Candidate	Votes	%	±%
Liberal Democrats	Joyce Richmond	1,222	64.7	
Conservative	Roger Frost	318	16.8	
Labour	Stephen Anglesey	291	15.4	
Green	Ian West	58	3.1	
Majority		904	47.9	
Turnout		1,889		

Tudor
Party	Candidate	Votes	%	±%
Liberal Democrats	Lindsey Scudder	705	36.5	
Conservative	Richard Southern	636	32.9	
Labour	Sheila Rosser	524	27.1	
Green	Clive Skinner	66	3.4	
Majority		69	3.6	
Turnout		1,931		

Vicarage
Party	Candidate	Votes	%	±%
Labour	Brian Graham	826	44.5	
Liberal Democrats	Shahnaz Ali	595	32.0	
Conservative	Khalid Khan	299	16.1	
Green	Paul Sandford	137	7.4	
Majority		231	12.5	
Turnout		1,857		

Woodside
Party	Candidate	Votes	%	±%
Liberal Democrats	Eleanor Burtenshaw	1,076	62.7	
Labour	Marion Chambers	422	24.6	
Conservative	Grace Cordell	180	10.5	
Green	Faye Cullen	38	2.2	
Majority		654	38.1	
Turnout		1,716		

== Mayoral election ==
2002 Watford mayoral election
- 2 May 2002
- Turnout: 22,170 (36.1%)
	First party	Second party	Third party
		Lab	Con
Candidate	Dorothy Thornhill	Vince Muspratt	Gary Ling
Party	Liberal Democrats	Labour	Conservative
First round	10,954 (49.4%)	4,899 (22.1%)	4,746 (21.4%)
Final round	13,473 (71.9%)	5,269 (28.1%)	Eliminated
Mayor before election
Position established
Elected Mayor
Dorothy Thornhill
Liberal Democrat

The position of Mayor of Watford was created following a 2001 referendum that showed majority support among residents. The Labour Party selected Vince Muspratt, the Central ward councillor who had led Watford Borough Council since 1995, as their candidate for the new position. Oxhey ward councillor Dorothy Thornhill was announced as the Liberal Democrat candidate. The Conservative Party selected Gary Ling as their candidate, while charity worker Stephen Rackett was announced as the Green Party candidate. Additional candidates included Paul Woodward of the Socialist Alliance and Tristram Cooke of the Fat Cat Party.

Conservative candidate Gary Ling was criticised by the Labour campaign for "extremist" views, with former Conservative group leader and independent councillor Ian Brown, who endorsed the Labour candidate, labelling Ling a type of "hard line Thatcherite and free marketer ... rejected by the current Conservative Party". Ling and Liberal Democrat candidate Dorothy Thornhill were also criticised by Labour for alleged "U-turns" on the promise of a second referendum, which they denied.

Labour candidate Vince Muspratt was criticised by local campaigner Jean Brett for a pledge to add Watford seniors to London's concessionary travel scheme due to the transfer of cardiology services from Harefield Hospital to a hospital in Paddington. Brett claimed she backed the policy but disagreed with Harefield Hospital being used as a justification for it due to campaigners working to prevent the closure of the hospital and the removal of its cardiology services. Brett accused Muspratt of "[forgetting] the people of Watford".

Dorothy Thornhill of the Liberal Democrats won the election with 10,954 votes in the first round and 13,473 in the second, becoming the first female directly elected mayor in the United Kingdom and the first Liberal Democrat directly elected mayor. The Labour Party candidate Vince Muspratt, originally considered the favourite, finished in second with 4,899 votes in the first round and 5,269 votes overall. Conservative Party candidate Gary Ling finished third and Green Party candidate Stephen Rackett finished fourth, while the Socialist Alliance's Paul Woodward and the Fat Cat Party's Tristram Cooke finished fifth and sixth respectively. Thornhill's victory was considered a major upset, with The Guardian labelling it a "humiliation" for the Labour Party.

2002 Watford mayoral election
Party	Candidate	1st round		2nd round			1st round votesTransfer votes, 2nd round
Party	Candidate	Total	Of round	Transfers	Total	Of round	1st round votesTransfer votes, 2nd round
Liberal Democrats	Dorothy Thornhill	10,954	49.4%	2,519	13,473	71.9%	
Labour	Vince Muspratt	4,899	22.1%	370	5,269	28.1%	
Conservative	Gary Ling	4,746	21.4%				
Green	Stephen Rackett	851	3.8%				
Socialist Alliance	Paul Woodward	390	1.8%				
Fat Cat	Tristram Cooke	330	1.5%				
Turnout		22,170	36.1%				
Liberal Democrats win							
