= 2006 Watford Borough Council election =

2006 UK local government election

Results of the 2006 Watford Borough Council election

The 2006 Watford Borough Council elections were held on 4 May 2006. These elections were held alongside the Watford mayoral election, where incumbent Liberal Democrat mayor Dorothy Thornhill was re-elected for a second term. The election in Nascot ward was postponed until 15 June due to the death of the original Labour candidate, Tom Meldrum, at age 85.

One third of the council was up for election and the Liberal Democrats kept overall control of the council.

After the election, the composition of the council was:

- Liberal Democrat 28
- Green 3
- Conservative 3
- Labour 1

== Council election result ==
2006 Watford Borough Council election
Party	Seats	Gains	Losses	Net gain/loss	Seats %	Votes %	Votes	+/−
Liberal Democrats	9	2	0	+2	75.0	42.3	10,137	-2.2%
Labour	1	0	3	-3	8.3	22.7	5,438	+3.6%
Conservative	1	0	0	0	8.3	22.4	5,366	-3.5%
Green	1	1	0	+1	8.3	12.7	3,046	+2.2%

== Ward results ==
Callowland
Party	Candidate	Votes	%	±%
Green	Georgina Mann	1,000	54.0	−3.3
Labour	Daniel Scott	350	18.9	+1.8
Liberal Democrats	Kelly McLeod	293	15.8	+1.6
Conservative	Jonathan Cordell	208	11.2	−0.3
Majority		650	35.1	−5.1
Turnout		1,851	37.3	+0.7
Green gain from Labour		Swing		

Central
Party	Candidate	Votes	%	±%
Liberal Democrats	Christopher Leslie	677	41.5	−8.6
Labour	Ian Lowery	429	26.3	+6.6
Conservative	Geoffrey Ogden	265	16.2	−1.7
Green	John Dowdle	261	16.0	+3.8
Majority		248	15.2	−15.2
Turnout		1,632	32.6	−0.1
Liberal Democrats hold		Swing		

Holywell
Party	Candidate	Votes	%	±%
Liberal Democrats	Janet Baddeley	936	44.7	+2.6
Labour	Nigel Bell	894	42.7	+1.7
Conservative	Carole Bamford	161	7.7	−3.4
Green	Martin Wiesner	103	4.9	−0.9
Majority		42	2.0	+0.9
Turnout		2,094	39.0	+3.1
Liberal Democrats hold		Swing		

Leggatts
Party	Candidate	Votes	%	±%
Liberal Democrats	Mohammad Razzaq	682	32.7	−9.8
Conservative	Amanda Grimston	543	26.1	−7.0
Green	Ian Brandon	502	24.1	+15.9
Labour	Marion Chambers	357	17.1	+0.9
Majority		139	6.6	−2.8
Turnout		2,084	40.5	+2.5
Liberal Democrats gain from Labour		Swing		

Meriden
Party	Candidate	Votes	%	±%
Liberal Democrats	Kareen Hastrick	844	43.4	+1.6
Labour	Geoffrey O'Connell	608	31.2	+0.5
Conservative	Roger Frost	395	20.3	+0.1
Green	Faye Cullen	99	5.1	−2.2
Majority		236	12.2	+1.1
Turnout		1,946	37.4	+1.1
Liberal Democrats gain from Labour		Swing		

Nascot (Note: This election was held on 15 June due to the death of the original Labour candidate Tom Meldrum.)
Party	Candidate	Votes	%	±%
Liberal Democrats	Mark Watkin	887		
Conservative	Angela Basit	828		
Green	Sally Ivins	145		
Labour	Mohammed Riaz	92		
Majority		59		
Turnout		1,952		
Liberal Democrats gain from Conservative		Swing		

Oxhey
Party	Candidate	Votes	%	±%
Liberal Democrats	Iain Sharpe	1,235	59.9	−4.2
Conservative	Richard Bamford	521	25.3	+3.4
Labour	Nnagbogu Akubue	173	8.4	−0.7
Green	Ruth Atkin	134	6.5	+1.5
Majority		714	34.6	−7.6
Turnout		2,063	42.0	+0.8
Liberal Democrats hold		Swing		

Park
Party	Candidate	Votes	%	±%
Conservative	Zoe McQuire	1,182	43.4	+4.4
Liberal Democrats	Bernadette Laventure	1,179	43.3	−8.4
Labour	Manzoor Hussain	192	7.1	+1.3
Green	Elaine Edwards	169	6.2	+2.7
Majority		3	0.1	
Turnout		2,722	52.0	−1.2
Conservative hold		Swing		

Stanborough
Party	Candidate	Votes	%	±%
Liberal Democrats	Keith Crout	958	50.0	−5.4
Conservative	Ian Blackledge	525	27.4	+2.8
Labour	Susan Burke	294	15.3	+1.4
Green	Kevin Pettifer	140	7.3	+1.2
Majority		433	22.6	−8.2
Turnout		1,917	37.9	+1.1
Liberal Democrats hold		Swing		

Tudor
Party	Candidate	Votes	%	±%
Liberal Democrats	Lindsey Scudder	879	44.8	−5.6
Conservative	Richard Southern	636	32.4	+2.8
Labour	Michael Jones	301	15.4	+1.5
Green	Carole Skinner	144	7.3	+1.2
Majority		243	12.4	−8.4
Turnout		1,960	43.3	−0.3
Liberal Democrats hold		Swing		

Vicarage (2 seats)
Party	Candidate	Votes	%	±%
Labour	Jagtar Dhindsa	789		
Liberal Democrats	Shameem Khan	755		
Liberal Democrats	Nasreen Ajab	740		
Labour	Nohreen Hamid	733		
Conservative	David Ealey	297		
Conservative	Mark Bunn	285		
Green	Anna Rackett	207		
Green	Robert Atkin	196		
Turnout		4,002	44.3	+3.3
Labour hold		Swing		
Liberal Democrats hold		Swing		

Woodside
Party	Candidate	Votes	%	±%
Liberal Democrats	Eleanor Burtenshaw	959	55.9	+0.7
Conservative	Paul Gurney	348	20.3	+0.9
Labour	John Young	318	18.5	−0.8
Green	Alan Maccormac	91	5.3	−0.8
Majority		611	35.6	−0.2
Turnout		1,716	34.7	+2.5
Liberal Democrats hold		Swing		

== Mayoral election ==
2006 Watford mayoral election
- 4 May 2006
- Turnout: 23,385 (39.2%)
	First party	Second party
Candidate	Dorothy Thornhill	Stephen O'Brien
Party	Liberal Democrats	Conservative
Popular vote	11,963	4,838
Percentage	51.2%	20.7%
Swing	▲1.8 pp	▼0.7 pp
	Third party	Fourth party
Candidate	Ruth Ellis	Stephen Rackett
Party	Labour	Green
Popular vote	4,062	2,522
Percentage	17.4%	10.8%
Swing	▼4.7 pp	▲7.0 pp
Mayor before election
Dorothy Thornhill
Liberal Democrat
Elected Mayor
Dorothy Thornhill
Liberal Democrat

2006 Watford mayoral election
Party	Candidate	1st round		2nd round			1st round votesTransfer votes, 2nd round
Party	Candidate	Total	Of round	Transfers	Total	Of round	1st round votesTransfer votes, 2nd round
Liberal Democrats	Dorothy Thornhill	11,963	51.2%				
Conservative	Stephen O'Brien	4,838	20.7%				
Labour	Ruth Ellis	4,062	17.4%				
Green	Stephen Rackett	2,522	10.8%				
Turnout		23,385	39.2%				
Liberal Democrats hold							
