= 2018 Watford Borough Council election =

2018 UK local government election

Map of the results

The 2018 Watford Borough Council election took place on 3 May 2018 to elect members of Watford Borough Council in England. This was the same day as other local elections.

Watford was one of the boroughs subject to a trial of voter ID restrictions requiring the production of polling cards.

Since the election of the full council in 2016, there had been three by-elections, but the balance of the council remained the same, as they were won by the defending party, in the case of Leggatts Ward by Labour and in the cases of Oxhey and Park by the Lib Dems.

== Results summary ==
Watford Borough Council election, 2018
Party	Seats	Gains	Losses	Net gain/loss	Seats %	Votes %	Votes	+/−
Liberal Democrats	9	1	0	▲1	76.92	43.6	11,957	+1.2
Labour	3	0	1	▼1	23.1	33.7	9,244	+5.0
Conservative	0	0	0	Steady	0	20.9	5,737	-9.9
Green	0	0	0	Steady	0	1.0	278	-4.6
UKIP	0	0	0	Steady	0	0.8	225	-1.5

== Ward results ==
An asterisk * indicates an incumbent seeking re-election.

=== Callowland ===
Callowland
Party	Candidate	Votes	%	±%
Liberal Democrats	Ian Stotesbury	1,044	45.6	▲12.8
Labour	Ahsan Khan*	832	36.4	▲2.8
Conservative	Anthony Parker	276	12.1	▲1.4
Green	Alison Wiesner	137	6.0	▼7.4
Majority		212	9.2	
Turnout		2,289	40.5	
Liberal Democrats gain from Labour		Swing	▲5.0	

No UKIP candidate as previous (-9.6%)

=== Central ===
Central
Party	Candidate	Votes	%	±%
Liberal Democrats	Aga Dychton*	930	40.7	▼0.9
Labour	Ani Meehan	912	40.0	▲6.5
Conservative	Dennis Wharton	300	13.1	▲3.0
Green	David Underdown	141	6.2	▼1.0
Majority		18	0.7	
Turnout		2,283	37.2	
Liberal Democrats hold		Swing	▲3.7	

=== Holywell ===
Holywell
Party	Candidate	Votes	%	±%
Labour	Matt Turmaine*	1,402	65.61	
Liberal Democrats	Syed Kazmi	436	20.40	
Conservative	Yasmin Goldsmith	299	13.99	
Majority		966	45.21	
Turnout		2137	33.38	
Labour hold		Swing		

=== Leggatts ===
Leggatts
Party	Candidate	Votes	%	±%
Labour	Bilqees Mauthoor*	1,121	50.61	
Liberal Democrats	Joe Inniss	719	32.46	
Conservative	David Ealey	375	16.93	
Majority		402	18.15	
Turnout		2215	39.01	
Labour hold		Swing		

=== Meriden ===
Meriden
Party	Candidate	Votes	%	±%
Liberal Democrats	Antony Barton	779	43.57	
Labour Co-op	John Dowdle	560	31.32	
Conservative	Linda Topping	449	25.11	
Majority		219	12.25	
Turnout		1788	31.35	
Liberal Democrats hold		Swing		

=== Nascot ===
Nascot
Party	Candidate	Votes	%	±%
Liberal Democrats	Jane Alexandra Johnson*	1,505	53.41	
Conservative	Binita Mehta-Parmar	725	25.73	
Labour	Edward John Tunnah	509	18.06	
UKIP	David Penn	79	2.80	
Majority		780	27.68	
Turnout		2818	43.08	
Liberal Democrats hold		Swing		

=== Oxhey ===
Oxhey
Party	Candidate	Votes	%	±%
Liberal Democrats	Maggie Parker	1,432	58.83	
Conservative	Joseph Gornicki	570	23.42	
Labour	Sue Sleeman	432	17.75	
Majority		862	35.41	
Turnout		2434	46.00	
Liberal Democrats hold		Swing		

=== Park ===
Park
Party	Candidate	Votes	%	±%
Liberal Democrats	Peter Kloss	1,588	51.77	
Conservative	David Fallon	889	28.99	
Labour	Nabila Ahmed	541	17.64	
UKIP	Peter Blogg	49	1.60	
Majority		699	22.78	
Turnout		3067	48.63	
Liberal Democrats hold		Swing		

=== Stanborough ===
Stanborough
Party	Candidate	Votes	%	±%
Liberal Democrats	Keith Crout*	1,242	62.82	
Conservative	Lola Adedoyin	385	19.47	
Labour	Asma Suleman	350	17.70	
Majority		857	43.35	
Turnout		1977	35.24	
Liberal Democrats hold		Swing		

=== Tudor ===
Tudor
Party	Candidate	Votes	%	±%
Liberal Democrats	Stephen Johnson*	951	44.65	
Labour	Diana Ivory	615	28.87	
Conservative	Darren Harrison^{a}	564	26.48	
Majority		336	15.78	
Turnout		2130	40.44	
Liberal Democrats hold		Swing		

- ^{a} Darren Harrison was suspended by the Conservative Party after having alleged links to the EDL and other far-right groups. He remained on the ballot as a Conservative candidate.

=== Vicarage ===
Vicarage
Party	Candidate	Votes	%	±%
Labour	Nasreen Shah*	1,488	62.13	
Liberal Democrats	Tahair Azam	505	21.09	
Conservative	Michelle Sherman	402	16.78	
Majority		983	41.04	
Turnout		2395	43.08	
Labour hold		Swing		

=== Woodside ===
Woodside
Party	Candidate	Votes	%	±%
Liberal Democrats	Glen Saffery*	826	43.29	
Conservative	Sarah Hayes	503	26.36	
Labour	Seamus Williams	482	25.26	
UKIP	Ian Green	97	5.08	
Majority		323	16.93	
Turnout		1908	33.51	
Liberal Democrats hold		Swing		

== Mayoral election ==
2018 Watford mayoral election
- 3 May 2018
- Turnout: 27,289
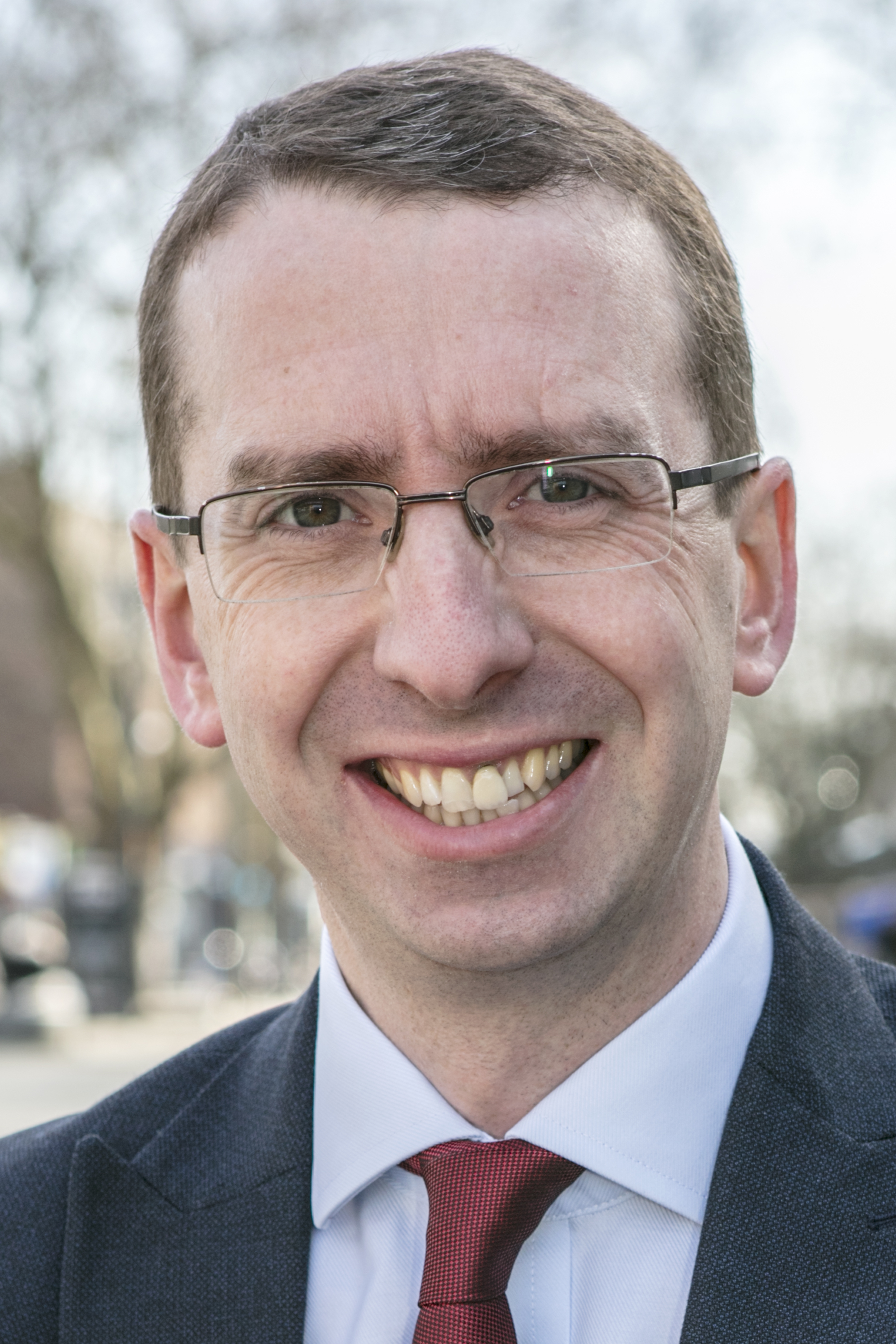
	First party	Second party	Third party
		Lab	Con
Candidate	Peter Taylor	Jagtar Dhindsa	George Jabbour
Party	Liberal Democrats	Labour	Conservative
First round	13,279 (48.7%)	9,223 (33.8%)	4,787 (17.5%)
Final round	15,931 (61.6%)	9,951 (38.4%)	Eliminated
Mayor before election
Dorothy Thornhill
Liberal Democrat
Elected Mayor
Peter Taylor
Liberal Democrat

In 2015, incumbent Liberal Democrat mayor Dorothy Thornhill announced that she would not be running for re-election in 2018 and would instead take her seat in the House of Lords. Peter Taylor, a councillor for Oxhey, was selected as the Liberal Democrat candidate to replace Thornhill in July 2017. That same month, the Conservative Party selected George Jabbour as their candidate. In October 2017, the Labour Party selected Vicarage councillor Jagtar Dhindsa as their candidate.

2018 Watford mayoral election
Party	Candidate	1st round		2nd round			1st round votesTransfer votes, 2nd round
Party	Candidate	Total	Of round	Transfers	Total	Of round	1st round votesTransfer votes, 2nd round
Liberal Democrats	Peter Taylor	13,279	48.7%	2,652	15,931	61.6%	
Labour	Jagtar Dhindsa	9,223	33.8%	728	9,951	38.4%	
Conservative	George Jabbour	4,787	17.5%				
Turnout		27,289					
Liberal Democrats hold							
