= 2024 Watford Borough Council election =

English local election

← 2023	2 May 2024	2026 →

12 out of 36 seats to Watford Borough Council 19 seats needed for a majority

	First party	Second party
Leader	Jennifer Pattinson	Nigel Bell
Party	Liberal Democrats	Labour
Last election	27 seats, 48.8%	9 seats, 30.8%
Seats before	27	9
Seats won	11	1
Seats after	30	6
Seat change	▲3	▼3
Popular vote	11,243	6,775
Percentage	48.2%	29.1%
Swing	▼0.6%	▼1.7%
- Winner of each seat at the 2024 Watford Borough Council election
Mayor before election
Peter Taylor
Liberal Democrats
Mayor after election
Peter Taylor
Liberal Democrats

The 2024 Watford Borough Council election took place on 2 May 2024 to elect members of Watford Borough Council in Hertfordshire, England. This was on the same day as other local elections. One third of the council's seats were up for election.

== Summary ==
The council was under Liberal Democrat majority control prior to election, and the party also held the position of the directly elected Mayor of Watford, which was not up for election in 2024. Given the size of the party's majority prior to the election, it was impossible for them to lose control at this election. In the event, the party actually increased their majority, gaining three seats from Labour.

=== Election result ===
2024 Watford Borough Council election
Party	This election			Full council			This election		
Party	Seats	Net	Seats %	Other	Total	Total %	Votes	Votes %	+/−
Liberal Democrats	11	▲3	91.7	19	30	83.3	11,243	48.2	–0.6
Labour	1	▼3	8.3	5	6	16.7	6,775	29.1	–1.7
Conservative	0	Steady	0.0	0	0	0.0	3,612	15.5	–2.0
Reform	0	Steady	0.0	0	0	0.0	1,113	4.8	+2.7
Green	0	Steady	0.0	0	0	0.0	239	1.0	+0.8
TUSC	0	Steady	0.0	0	0	0.0	204	0.9	+0.5
Independent	0	Steady	0.0	0	0	0.0	68	0.3	N/A
Heritage	0	Steady	0.0	0	0	0.0	65	0.3	±0.0

== Ward results ==
The Statement of Persons Nominated, which details the candidates standing in each ward, was released by Watford Borough Council following the close of nominations on 8 April 2024.

=== Callowland ===
Callowland
Party	Candidate	Votes	%	±%
Liberal Democrats	Richard Short	1,069	51.9	+4.2
Labour	Dannis Watling*	829	40.3	±0.0
Conservative	Nick Kahan	161	7.8	−4.2
Majority				
Turnout		2,059	34.15	
Registered electors				
Liberal Democrats gain from Labour		Swing		

=== Central ===
Central
Party	Candidate	Votes	%	±%
Liberal Democrats	Sam Summer	924	46.2	−7.4
Labour	Mo Hakim	572	28.6	−2.7
Conservative	Devyani Bajaj	259	12.9	+3.4
Reform	David Ealey	125	6.2	+0.6
Independent	Dennis Wharton	68	3.4	N/A
TUSC	James O'Connor	53	2.6	N/A
Majority				
Turnout		2,001	28.15	
Registered electors				
Liberal Democrats hold		Swing		

=== Holywell ===
Holywell
Party	Candidate	Votes	%	±%
Labour	Nigel Bell*	1,159	60.1	+2.8
Liberal Democrats	Simon Morrison	352	18.2	−1.8
Conservative	Danny Moseley	328	17.0	−2.3
TUSC	Mark O'Connor	91	4.7	+1.2
Majority				
Turnout		1,930	26.95	
Registered electors				
Labour hold		Swing		

=== Leggatts ===
Leggatts
Party	Candidate	Votes	%	±%
Liberal Democrats	Sham Begum	864	42.6	+8.2
Labour	Asma Suleman	689	34.0	−11.6
Conservative	James Fanning	350	17.3	+1.9
Heritage	Sarah Knott	65	3.2	−0.2
TUSC	Derek Foster	60	3.0	+1.8
Majority				
Turnout		2,028	34.52	
Registered electors				
Liberal Democrats gain from Labour		Swing		

=== Meriden ===
Meriden
Party	Candidate	Votes	%	±%
Liberal Democrats	Annalisa Buraglio	643	44.7	−5.1
Labour	Keith Morgan	377	26.2	+0.3
Conservative	Jennie Raperport	314	21.8	−2.5
Reform	Ian Green	106	7.4	N/A
Majority				
Turnout		1,440	25.03	
Registered electors				
Liberal Democrats hold		Swing		

=== Nascot ===
Nascot
Party	Candidate	Votes	%	±%
Liberal Democrats	Mark Watkin*	1,394	59.1	+1.6
Conservative	Stephen Woodard	422	17.9	−3.9
Labour	Seamus Williams	385	16.3	+1.2
Reform	Charlie Xie	158	6.7	+1.1
Majority				
Turnout		2,359	34.66	
Registered electors				
Liberal Democrats hold		Swing		

=== Oxhey ===
Oxhey
Party	Candidate	Votes	%	±%
Liberal Democrats	Karen Clarke-Taylor*	1,267	66.1	−1.1
Labour	Anthony Scott-Norman	231	12.0	−0.7
Conservative	Sahil Ghuman	222	11.6	−6.1
Reform	Neal Webber	100	5.2	+2.9
Green	Shaun Howard	98	5.1	N/A
Majority				
Turnout		1,918	34.23	
Registered electors				
Liberal Democrats hold		Swing		

=== Park ===
Park
Party	Candidate	Votes	%	±%
Liberal Democrats	Gabriel Duduta	1,413	58.8	−1.6
Conservative	Arijit Mukherjee	380	15.8	−3.4
Labour	Rajinder Dhindsa	352	14.6	−1.1
Reform	John Craddock	259	10.8	+6.1
Majority				
Turnout		2,404	36.98	
Registered electors				
Liberal Democrats hold		Swing		

=== Stanborough ===
Stanborough
Party	Candidate	Votes	%	±%
Liberal Democrats	Clara Ansong	798	49.9	−8.0
Conservative	Peter Williams	307	19.2	+1.5
Labour	Laura Griffiths	294	18.4	+1.2
Reform	Gary Ling	200	12.5	+8.5
Majority				
Turnout		1,599	28.03	
Registered electors				
Liberal Democrats hold		Swing		

=== Tudor ===
Tudor
Party	Candidate	Votes	%	±%
Liberal Democrats	Darren Walford*	827	47.4	−4.9
Labour	Ola Alade	408	23.4	+2.4
Conservative	Carly Bishop	346	19.8	−6.9
Reform	John Dowdle	165	9.5	N/A
Majority				
Turnout		1,746	33.30	
Registered electors				
Liberal Democrats hold		Swing		

=== Vicarage ===
Vicarage
Party	Candidate	Votes	%	±%
Liberal Democrats	Sohail Bashir	987	43.5	+13.7
Labour	Sara Trebar*	907	40.0	−19.6
Conservative	Vibhor Agarwal	232	10.2	−0.4
Green	David Gordon	141	6.2	N/A
Majority				
Turnout		2,267	37.90	
Registered electors				
Liberal Democrats gain from Labour		Swing		

=== Woodside ===
Woodside
Party	Candidate	Votes	%	±%
Liberal Democrats	Ann Saffery*	705	45.0	−5.1
Labour	Anne Joynes	572	36.5	+5.0
Conservative	Kingsley Owen	291	18.6	+0.2
Majority				
Turnout		1,568	27.29	
Registered electors				
Liberal Democrats hold		Swing		

== By-elections ==
=== Holywell ===
Holywell by-election: 1 May 2025
Party	Candidate	Votes	%	±%
Labour	Asma Suleman	573	33.2	–26.9
Liberal Democrats	Callum Robertson	532	30.8	+12.6
Reform	David Ealey	294	17.0	N/A
Conservative	Sanjaya Pant	180	10.4	–6.6
Green	Jake Mitchell	126	7.3	N/A
TUSC	Mark O'Connor	23	1.3	–3.4
Majority		41	2.4	–39.5
Turnout		1,728	23.4	–3.6
Labour hold		Swing	▼19.8	

=== Oxhey ===
Oxhey by-election: 1 May 2025
Party	Candidate	Votes	%	±%
Liberal Democrats	Iain Sharpe	1,061	61.0	–5.1
Reform	Michael Barrett	302	17.4	+12.2
Conservative	Peter Williams	136	7.8	–3.8
Labour	Sonu Masania	132	7.6	–4.4
Green	David Gordon	99	5.7	+0.6
TUSC	James O'Connor	10	0.6	N/A
Majority		759	43.6	–10.5
Turnout		1,740	30.6	–3.6
Liberal Democrats hold		Swing	▼8.7	

=== Tudor ===
Tudor by-election: 4 December 2025
Party	Candidate	Votes	%	±%
Liberal Democrats	Callum Robertson	821	51.6%	+4.3
Reform	Mark Dixon	433	27.2%	+17.8
Conservative	Danny Mosley	148	9.3%	−10.5
Labour	Seamus Williams	111	7.0%	−16.4
Green	Dave Dunckley	77	4.8%	New
Majority		388		
Turnout		1590	30.49%	
Registered electors				
Liberal Democrats hold		Swing		
