= 2026 Watford Borough Council election =

2026 English local government election

- 7 May 2026

12 out of 36 seats to Watford Borough Council 19 seats needed for a majority
	First party	Second party
Leader	Jennifer Pattinson	Nigel Bell
Party	Liberal Democrats	Labour
Leader's seat	Meriden	Holywell
Last election	30 seats, 48.2%	6 seat, 29.1%
Seats before	30	6
Seats won	12	0
Seats after	32	4
Seat change	▲2	▼2
Popular vote	12,394	3,335
Percentage	44.8%	12.1%
Swing	▼3.4%	▼17.0%
- Winner of each seat at the 2026 Watford Borough Council election.
Mayor before election
Peter Taylor
Liberal Democrats
Mayor after election
Peter Taylor
Liberal Democrats

The 2026 Watford Borough Council election was held on 7 May 2026, alongside the other local elections across the United Kingdom held on the same day, to elect 12 of 36 members of Watford Borough Council. The election was held alongside the 2026 Watford mayoral election.

Due to ongoing local government reorganisation, this was the final election to Watford Borough Council before it is abolished and replaced by a successor unitary authority. Elections to the successor authority are due to take place in 2027. In the election, the Liberal Democrats won all 12 seats, including two gains from the Labour Party, and maintained control of the council.

== Background ==
In the 2024 local elections, the Liberal Democrats won 11 of the 12 seats up for election, including three seats gained from the Labour Party, who held their leader's seat of Holywell. With their election win, the Liberal Democrats maintained their 21-year control of the council. In the 2024 general election, the Labour Party candidate Matt Turmaine gained the Watford constituency from the Conservative Party incumbent Dean Russell. In January 2026, the council was given the option to cancel the 2026 elections in preparation for local government reorganisation, however, the council decided to proceed with the elections to "allow residents the right to exercise their democratic rights".

Three by-elections were held between the 2024 and 2026 elections:

By-elections
Ward	Date	Incumbent		Winner		Cause	Ref.
Ward	Date	Party	Councillor	Party	Candidate	Cause	Ref.
Holywell	1 May 2025	Labour	Matt Turmaine	Labour	Asma Suleman	Elected as the Member of Parliament for Watford	
Oxhey	1 May 2025	Liberal Democrats	Chris Newstead	Liberal Democrats	Iain Sharpe	Resigned due to moving out of area	
Tudor	4 December 2025	Liberal Democrats	Charlott Saunders	Liberal Democrats	Callum Robertson	Resigned due to personal reasons	

== Summary ==
=== Election result ===
2026 Watford Borough Council election
Party	This election				Full council			This election		
Party	Candidates	Seats	Net	Seats %	Other	Total	Total %	Votes	Votes %	+/−
Liberal Democrats	12	12	▲2	100.0	20	32	88.9	12,394	44.8	–3.4
Labour	12	0	▼2	0.0	4	4	11.1	3,335	12.1	–17.0
Reform	12	0	Steady	0.0	0	0	0.0	5,478	19.8	+15.0
Green	12	0	Steady	0.0	0	0	0.0	3,748	13.6	+12.6
Conservative	12	0	Steady	0.0	0	0	0.0	2,602	9.4	–6.1
TUSC	3	0	Steady	0.0	0	0	0.0	78	0.3	–0.6
Heritage	1	0	Steady	0.0	0	0	0.0	19	0.1	–0.2

== Results by ward ==
=== Callowland ===
Callowland
Party	Candidate	Votes	%	±%
Liberal Democrats	Ian Stotesbury	1,030	50.2	–1.7
Green	Seen Lavelle	343	16.7	N/A
Reform	Lisa Godden	331	16.1	N/A
Labour	Ola Alade	250	12.2	–28.1
Conservative	Zeba Laskar	97	4.7	–3.1
Majority		687	33.5	+21.9
Turnout		2,051	33.7	–0.5
Registered electors		~6,068		
Liberal Democrats hold				

=== Central ===
Central
Party	Candidate	Votes	%	±%
Liberal Democrats	Aga Dychton	1,094	47.9	+1.7
Green	Stephen Burrows	449	19.6	N/A
Reform	Xiaolei Xie	307	13.4	+7.2
Labour	Mo Hakim	265	11.6	–17.0
Conservative	Avi Geller	170	7.4	–5.5
Majority		645	28.3	+10.7
Turnout		2,285	31.6	+3.4
Registered electors		~7,231		
Liberal Democrats hold				

=== Holywell ===
Holywell
Party	Candidate	Votes	%	±%
Liberal Democrats	Emil Rowe	728	29.3	+11.1
Labour	Asma Suleman	649	26.1	–34.0
Green	Jake Mitchell	467	18.8	N/A
Reform	Michael Barrett	393	15.8	N/A
Conservative	Sanjaya Pant	217	8.7	–8.3
TUSC	Mark O'Connor	32	1.3	–3.4
Majority		79	3.2	N/A
Turnout		2,486	33.1	+6.1
Registered electors		~7,511		
Liberal Democrats gain from Labour				

=== Leggatts ===
Leggatts
Party	Candidate	Votes	%	±%
Liberal Democrats	Monjuma Rahman	776	36.3	–6.3
Reform	Daniel Bagley	485	22.7	N/A
Green	Malcolm Bush	349	16.3	N/A
Labour	Marius Lupu	320	15.0	–19.0
Conservative	Junaid Laskar	172	8.0	–9.3
Heritage	Sarah Knott	19	0.9	–2.3
TUSC	Derek Foster	17	0.8	–2.2
Majority		291	13.6	+5.0
Turnout		2,138	35.4	+0.9
Liberal Democrats hold				

=== Meriden ===
Meriden
Party	Candidate	Votes	%	±%
Liberal Democrats	Jennifer Pattinson	834	41.3	–3.4
Reform	Mark Dixon	632	31.3	+23.9
Conservative	Jennie Raperport	202	10.0	–11.8
Green	Alison Wiesner	194	9.6	N/A
Labour	Richard Smith	156	7.7	–18.5
Majority		202	10.0	–8.5
Turnout		2,018	33.9	+8.9
Liberal Democrats hold		Swing	▼13.7	

=== Nascot ===
Nascot
Party	Candidate	Votes	%	±%
Liberal Democrats	Tom Osborn	1,329	49.1	–10.0
Reform	Tristan Masson	441	16.3	+9.6
Conservative	Ravi Kura	420	15.5	–2.4
Green	Nicola Mitchell	314	11.6	N/A
Labour	Mick Cash	204	7.5	–8.8
Majority		888	32.8	–8.4
Turnout		2,708	40.3	+5.6
Registered electors		~6,720		
Liberal Democrats hold		Swing	▼9.8	

=== Oxhey ===
Oxhey
Party	Candidate	Votes	%	±%
Liberal Democrats	Shirena Counter	1,356	56.1	–10.0
Reform	Neal Webber	410	17.0	+11.8
Green	Angela Tunstall	262	10.8	+5.7
Conservative	Carole Bamford	225	9.3	–2.3
Labour	Dylan Bartley-Downer	165	6.8	–5.2
Majority		946	39.1	–15.0
Turnout		2,418	42.4	+8.2
Registered electors		~5,703		
Liberal Democrats hold		Swing	▼10.9	

=== Park ===
Park
Party	Candidate	Votes	%	±%
Liberal Democrats	Peter Kloss	1,510	53.4	–5.4
Reform	John Craddock	423	15.0	+4.2
Green	Maria Mandic	401	14.2	N/A
Conservative	Arijit Mukherjee	323	11.4	–4.4
Labour	Helen Rice	172	6.1	–8.5
Majority		1,087	38.4	–4.6
Turnout		2,829	43.1	+6.1
Registered electors		~6,564		
Liberal Democrats hold		Swing	▼4.8	

=== Stanborough ===
Stanborough
Party	Candidate	Votes	%	±%
Liberal Democrats	Rhoda Amezado	945	43.6	–6.3
Reform	Malcolm Caborn	603	27.8	+15.3
Conservative	Peter Williams	269	12.4	–6.8
Green	David Gordon	203	9.4	N/A
Labour	Laura Griffiths	147	6.8	–11.6
Majority		342	15.8	–14.9
Turnout		2,167	38.1	+10.1
Registered electors		~5,688		
Liberal Democrats hold		Swing	▼10.8	

=== Tudor ===
Tudor
Party	Candidate	Votes	%	±%
Liberal Democrats	Sean Silver	949	45.8	–1.6
Reform	John Dowdle	513	24.8	+15.3
Conservative	Danny Mosley	214	10.3	–9.5
Green	Dave Dunckley	203	9.8	N/A
Labour	Diana Ivory	192	9.3	–14.1
Majority		436	21.0	–3.0
Turnout		2,071	39.7	+6.4
Registered electors		~5,217		
Liberal Democrats hold		Swing	▼8.5	

=== Vicarage ===
Vicarage
Party	Candidate	Votes	%	±%
Liberal Democrats	Sandra Mano	892	38.5	–5.0
Labour	Nasreen Shah	648	28.0	–12.0
Green	Sarah McMahon	368	15.9	+9.7
Reform	David Ealey	254	11.0	N/A
Conservative	Vibhor Agarwal	125	5.4	–4.8
TUSC	James O'Connor	29	1.3	N/A
Majority		244	10.5	+7.0
Turnout		2,316	38.3	+0.4
Registered electors		~6,047		
Liberal Democrats gain from Labour		Swing	▲3.5	

=== Woodside ===
Woodside
Party	Candidate	Votes	%	±%
Liberal Democrats	Glen Saffery	951	43.9	–1.1
Reform	Thomas Brooks	686	31.7	N/A
Green	Dani White	195	9.0	N/A
Conservative	Lola Adedoyin	168	7.8	–10.8
Labour	Anne Joynes	167	7.7	–28.8
Majority		265	12.2	+3.7
Turnout		2,167	37.1	+9.8
Registered electors		~5,841		
Liberal Democrats hold				
