= 2016 Watford Borough Council election =

2016 UK local government election

2016 local election results in Watford

The 2016 Watford Borough Council election took place on 5 May 2016 to elect members of Watford Borough Council in England. This was on the same day as other nationwide local elections. The entire council was up for election, with each of the 12 wards electing 3 councillors.

This result had the following consequences for the total number of seats on the Council after the elections:

Party	Previous council	New council	+/-
Liberal Democrats	18	25	▲7
Labour	13	11	▼2
Conservatives	5	0	▼5
Green	0	0	0
UKIP	0	0	0
Total	36	36	
Working majority	0	14	

== Results summary ==
Watford Borough Council election, 2016
Party	Seats	Gains	Losses	Net gain/loss	Seats %	Votes %	Votes	+/−
Liberal Democrats	25	7	0	▲7		42.4	29,228	+13.9
Labour	11	0	2	▼2		28.7	19,788	+1.3
Conservative	0	0	5	▼5		20.8	14,330	-7.5
Green	0	0	0	Steady		5.6	3,834	-1.2
UKIP	0	0	0	Steady		2.3	1,582	-7.1
TUSC	0	0	0	Steady		0.3	199	-0.2

== Ward results ==
=== Callowland ===
Callowland
Party	Candidate	Votes	%	±%
Conservative	Yasmin Isabella Goldsmith	174		
Conservative	Timothy Mortimer	221		
Conservative	Larry Rach	138		
Green	Alistair Thomas Carvell	276		
Green	Clair Louise Lester	217		
Green	Sean James Sweeney	254		
Labour	Sohail Bashir	691		
Labour	Favour Ewudo	627		
Labour	Ahsan Khan	659		
Liberal Democrats	Paul Andrew Stanhope Arnett	655		
Liberal Democrats	Robbie Laird	676		
Liberal Democrats	Ian Alexander Eric Stotesbury	581		
UKIP	Jon Goddard	197		
Majority				
Labour hold		Swing		
Liberal Democrats gain from Labour		Swing		
Labour hold		Swing		

=== Central ===
Central
Party	Candidate	Votes	%	±%
Conservative	Basil Sackett	189		
Conservative	Mary Sackett	203		
Conservative	Barry Silverman	214		
Green	Lisa Emery	142		
Green	Neal Emery	97		
Green	Su Murray	148		
Labour	Terry Butler	688		
Labour	Sarah Flynn	682		
Labour	Mike Haley	676		
Liberal Democrats	Stephen Bolton	856		
Liberal Democrats	Aga Dychton	759		
Liberal Democrats	Rabi Martins	850		
UKIP	Renie Susan Price	151		
Majority				
Liberal Democrats hold		Swing		
Liberal Democrats hold		Swing		
Liberal Democrats gain from Labour		Swing		

=== Holywell ===
Holywell
Party	Candidate	Votes	%	±%
Conservative	Prasi Bhatt	144		
Conservative	Camilla Zaman Khawaja	134		
Conservative	Penelope Anne Mortimer	208		
Green	Jim Grant	108		
Green	Rhiannon Emma Louise Grant	133		
Green	Anne Simpson	72		
Labour	Nigel Bell	1200		
Labour	Jackie Connal	924		
Labour	Matt Turmaine	917		
Liberal Democrats	Simonie Rose Jeffree	210		
Liberal Democrats	Frances Kershaw	184		
Liberal Democrats	Qaiser Mahmood	172		
TUSC	Clive Jones	39		
UKIP	Gavin Stephen Smith	199		
Majority				
Labour hold		Swing		
Labour hold		Swing		
Labour hold		Swing		

=== Leggatts ===
Leggatts
Party	Candidate	Votes	%	±%
Conservative	Elliot Gordon Gay	346		
Conservative	Neil Punter	391		
Conservative	Sally Punter	395		
Green	Stephanie Ashley	296		
Labour	Anne Joynes	907		
Labour	Asif Khan	844		
Labour	Bilqees Mauthoor	736		
Liberal Democrats	Jamil Minhas	319		
Liberal Democrats	Yasmine Rihanna Walford	313		
Liberal Democrats	Elizabeth Watkin	340		
TUSC	Thineshkumar Balasingam	91		
Majority				
Labour hold		Swing		
Labour hold		Swing		
Labour hold		Swing		

=== Meriden ===
Meriden
Party	Candidate	Votes	%	±%
Conservative	Phil Cox	287		
Conservative	Ray Gomm	283		
Conservative	Mark Edward Whitman	301		
Green	Maureen Linda Challis	157		
Labour	Omar Ismail	400		
Labour	Ian Murphy	402		
Labour	Seamus Williams	394		
Liberal Democrats	Amanda Grimston	909		
Liberal Democrats	Kareen Mary Hastrick	918		
Liberal Democrats	Paddy Kent	848		
TUSC	Derek Foster	63		
UKIP	Nick Lincoln	336		
Majority				
Liberal Democrats hold		Swing		
Liberal Democrats hold		Swing		
Liberal Democrats gain from Conservative		Swing		

=== Nascot ===
Nascot
Party	Candidate	Votes	%	±%
Conservative	Andrew Mortimer	1014		
Conservative	Amarish Patel	667		
Conservative	Linda Topping	890		
Green	Sally Rose Ivins	205		
Green	James Alexander Jenkins	80		
Green	Dorothy Mary Nixon	121		
Labour	Michael Harry Barnes	321		
Labour	Daniel Kerry	271		
Labour	Edward John Tunnah	249		
Liberal Democrats	Mark John Hofman	1263		
Liberal Democrats	Jane Alexandra Johnson	1207		
Liberal Democrats	Mark Adrian Watkin	1398		
UKIP	David Penn	200		
Majority				
Liberal Democrats hold		Swing		
Liberal Democrats hold		Swing		
Liberal Democrats gain from Conservative		Swing		

=== Oxhey ===
Oxhey
Party	Candidate	Votes	%	±%
Conservative	Dina Bhudia	275		
Conservative	Haydon Chart	308		
Conservative	Gail Martin	230		
Green	Matthew Thomas Hale	231		
Labour	Deborah Elizabeth Marchant	338		
Labour	Sue Sleeman	312		
Labour	Stephen Joseph Vincent	243		
Liberal Democrats	Joanna Emily Maestas	1247		
Liberal Democrats	Iain Scott Sharpe	1307		
Liberal Democrats	Peter Colin Taylor	1256		
TUSC	Mark Stephen O'Connor	69		
Majority				
Liberal Democrats hold		Swing		
Liberal Democrats hold		Swing		
Liberal Democrats hold		Swing		

=== Park ===
Park
Party	Candidate	Votes	%	±%
Conservative	Zoë McQuire	876		
Conservative	Binita Mehta	1114		
Conservative	Rosemarie Moore	821		
Green	Elaine Edwards	143		
Green	Stephanie Ann Grant	127		
Green	Tom Pashby	147		
Labour	Susan Elaine Billington	379		
Labour	David Corbet Connal	342		
Labour	Junior Sesay	292		
Liberal Democrats	David John Barks	1185		
Liberal Democrats	Anne Rindl	1488		
Liberal Democrats	Nikki Steele	1193		
UKIP	Peter John Widdrington Blogg	209		
Majority				
Liberal Democrats hold		Swing		
Liberal Democrats gain from Conservative		Swing		
Liberal Democrats hold		Swing		

=== Stanborough ===
Stanborough
Party	Candidate	Votes	%	±%
Conservative	Chris Hawes	447		
Conservative	Sarah Hayes	430		
Conservative	Dennis Wharton	362		
Green	Holly Fleming	166		
Labour	Nevin Atasoy	328		
Labour	Mavis Beulah Tyrwhitt	306		
Labour	Norman Hugh Tyrwhitt	288		
Liberal Democrats	Keith Murray Crout	1030		
Liberal Democrats	Derek Thomas Francis Scudder	1139		
Liberal Democrats	Tim Williams	1060		
TUSC	John McShane	69		
Majority				
Liberal Democrats hold		Swing		
Liberal Democrats hold		Swing		
Liberal Democrats hold		Swing		

=== Tudor ===
Tudor
Party	Candidate	Votes	%	±%
Conservative	Adam Keene	514		
Conservative	Sean Silver	495		
Conservative	Pam Stacey	393		
Green	Kiernon Murray	150		
Labour	Denis Calnan	392		
Labour	Diana Mary Ivory	430		
Labour	Mike Jones	372		
Liberal Democrats	Joe Fahmy	804		
Liberal Democrats	Stephen Edward Johnson	790		
Liberal Democrats	Darren Walford	1067		
Majority				
Liberal Democrats hold		Swing		
Liberal Democrats hold		Swing		
Liberal Democrats gain from Conservative		Swing		

=== Vicarage ===
Vicarage
Party	Candidate	Votes	%	±%
Conservative	Kelly Gay	252		
Conservative	Andrew O'Brien	188		
Conservative	Michelle Louise Sherman	183		
Green	David Degan	191		
Green	Matthew Long	123		
Green	Clair Victoria Pitkin	114		
Labour	Jagtar Singh Dhindsa	1112		
Labour	Mo Mills	1124		
Labour	Nasreen Shah	1025		
Liberal Democrats	Imran Hamid	216		
Liberal Democrats	Peter Lewis Jeffree	240		
Liberal Democrats	Maria Munir	279		
UKIP	Pat Shippey	189		
Majority				
Labour hold		Swing		
Labour hold		Swing		
Labour hold		Swing		

=== Woodside ===
Woodside
Party	Candidate	Votes	%	±%
Conservative	Tony Grillo	426		
Conservative	Tony Rogers	487		
Conservative	Estella Willems	339		
Green	Alison Jane Wiesner	136		
Labour	Manjivn Singh Dhindsa	282		
Labour	Andy O'Brien	308		
Labour	Richard Nathan Smith	317		
Liberal Democrats	Stephen Cavinder	801		
Liberal Democrats	Karen Ann Collett	941		
Liberal Democrats	Glen Bryce Saffery	727		
UKIP	Ian Frederick James Green	301		
Majority				
Liberal Democrats hold		Swing		
Liberal Democrats hold		Swing		
Liberal Democrats gain from Conservative		Swing		
