= Maria Munir =

English public speaker & activist

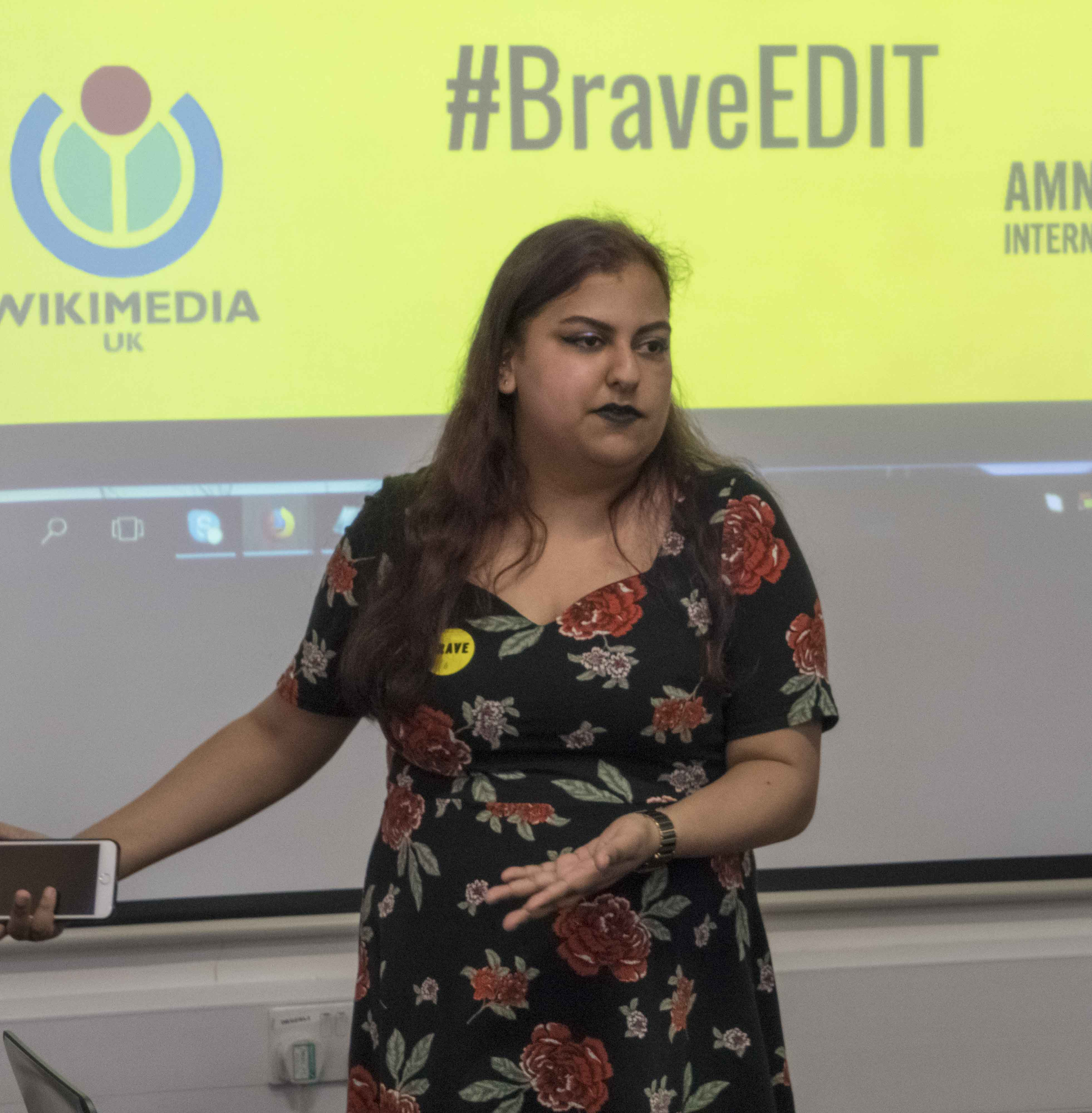
- Born: Watford, UK
- Education: BA (Hons) Politics with International Relations, University of York, 2016
- Occupations: Public speaker and activist
- Website: www.mariamunir.com

Maria Munir (/ˈmɑːriə/ MAHR-ee-ə) is a public speaker and human rights defender who speaks out on a range of discrimination issues, including transgender rights and non-binary discrimination. Munir campaigns to encourage governments to implement policies that do not discriminate against non-binary people.

== Activism ==
=== Non-binary rights ===
In April 2016, Munir came out as non-binary on live television at a question and answer session with former US President Barack Obama during his state visit to the United Kingdom. The decision to declare non-binary identity publicly gained media discussion of non-binary rights and Munir was interviewed on the subject by The Guardian, Channel 4, The Telegraph and others.

Munir campaigns to raise awareness of the meaning of identifying as non-binary, and campaigns for their rights. In a 2016 interview, Munir said: "At university I came across the idea of being non-binary, and straight away I knew that's me."

Munir has campaigned for the UK Parliament to extend the Equality Act 2010 to non-binary individuals.

=== Facial palsy ===
Munir was born with unilateral left-sided facial palsy. They created a poster campaign highlighting the symptoms of facial palsy, and worked with Fixers UK to broadcast a segment on the television program Calendar on ITV Tyne Tees about the effects of the condition, and addressed a conference of the Royal Society of Medicine in October 2015, to an audience of pediatricians and other professionals.

== Political career ==
Munir has been an active member of the Liberal Democrats, standing as a council candidate in their home town of Watford in the May 2016 Borough Council election. They stood in the Vicarage ward, a Labour stronghold, coming fourth with 279 votes. Munir campaigned for Sal Brinton's election as the Party Chair, and co-wrote the Your Liberal Britain strategy for the Liberal Democrats in September 2017 with Elaine Bagshaw, Duncan Brack, Rory Freckleton, Lee Howgate, Scott Smith, and Stephen Tall.

== Awards ==
In 2016, Munir was shortlisted for the Christine Jackson award by the advocacy group Liberty (advocacy group) for their work highlighting the inequality that exists in UK law relating to non-binary people. They were also named as one of 8 Girls' Champions as part of the BBC's 100 Women series.

In October 2018, Munir was awarded La Médaille du Barreau by L'Ordre des Avocats de Paris, along with other human rights advocates at the Human Rights Defenders World Summit 2018, symbolising their position as an honorary lawyer for their work.
