= St Matthew's Church, Oxhey =

Church in Hertfordshire, England

St Matthew's Oxhey

- Location of St Matthew's
- 51.64552373267116°N 0.3861504889860027°W
- OS grid reference: TQ 11755 95311
- Location: St Matthews Close, Watford, WD19 4ST
- Country: England
- Denomination: Church of England

History
- Founded: 1880

Architecture
- Heritage designation: Grade II listed
- Style: Red brick gothic

Administration
- Province: Province of Canterbury
- Diocese: Diocese of St Albans
- Parish: Oxhey

Clergy
- Vicar: Rev. Joanna Criscenti

St Matthew's Oxhey is a Church of England church in Oxhey Village, Watford, Hertfordshire, in England.

It is an active church situated approximately one mile from Watford town centre. St Matthew's is the parish church of Oxhey and is part of the Anglican Diocese of St Albans.

== Architecture ==
Constructed by W H Syme in 1880, the church is built in a red brick Gothic revival style, with some elements of early Art Nouveau decoration. It has a north-west tower and spire. In the Lady Chapel in the south transept, there is luminous stained glass, dating to circa 1916, by Karl Parsons. The building was Grade II listed in 1983.

== Memorials ==
The church carries a memorial to British aviator Reginald Warneford. Nicknamed 'Reckless Rex' by contemporary sources, Flt Sub Lt Warneford was renowned as the first airman to destroy a German Zeppelin in mid-air. Warneford's association with the Oxhey Village arose from his frequent stays at his aunt’s house.

== Location ==
St Matthew's lies on St Matthew's Close, off Eastbury Road. It backs directly onto Bushey station.
