= 2022 Watford Borough Council election =

- 5 May 2022

12 of the 36 seats on Watford Borough Council
Party	Liberal Democrats	Labour	Conservative
Last election	26 seats, 44.0%	4 seats, 28.6%	0 seats, 26.6%
- Map showing the results of the 2022 Watford Borough Council election. Liberal Democrats in amber, Labour in red.

The 2022 Watford Borough Council election took place on 5 May 2022. One third (12) of the 36 members of Watford Borough Council were elected. The elections took place alongside elections to local authorities across the United Kingdom, and an election for the Mayor of Watford.

The Liberal Democrats went into the election controlling the council, holding 24 of the 36 seats. They also held the mayorship, after Peter Taylor was elected in 2018.

== Electoral process ==
Watford Borough Council is elected in thirds, with a third of all seats up for election every year for three years, with an election to Hertfordshire County Council instead in the fourth year. The election took place by first-past-the-post voting, with wards represented by three councillors, with one elected in each election year to serve a four-year term. The seats up for election in 2022 are those last contested in the 2018 election.

== Results summary ==
2022 Watford Borough Council election
Party	This election				Full council			This election		
Party	Candidates	Seats	Net	Seats %	Other	Total	Total %	Votes	Votes %	+/−
Liberal Democrats	{{{candidates}}}	10	▲1	83.3	17	27	75.0	12,163	51.3	
Labour	{{{candidates}}}	2	▼1	16.7	7	9	25.0	6,624	27.9	
Conservative	{{{candidates}}}	0	0	0.0	0	0	0.0	4,642	19.6	
Independent	{{{candidates}}}	0	0	0.0	0	0	0.0	142	0.6	
TUSC	{{{candidates}}}	0	0	0.0	0	0	0.0	103	0.4	
Reform	{{{candidates}}}	0	0	0.0	0	0	0.0	37	0.2	

== Ward results ==
Candidates seeking re-election are marked with an asterisk (*).

=== Callowland ===
Callowland
Party	Candidate	Votes	%	±%
Liberal Democrats	Ian Stotesbury*	1,082	53.6	▲8.0
Labour	Terry Butler	729	36.1	▼0.3
Conservative	Matthew Geary	209	10.3	▼1.7
Majority		353	17.5	▲8.2
Turnout		2,020	35.0	
Liberal Democrats hold		Swing	▲4.1	

=== Central ===
Central
Party	Candidate	Votes	%	±%
Liberal Democrats	Aga Dychton*	1,151	55.4	▲13.6
Labour	Mohammed Wadud Hakim	553	26.6	▼12.7
Conservative	Hrithik Dattani	233	11.2	▼1.7
Independent	Dennis Wharton	142	6.8	New
Majority		598	28.8	▲26.3
Turnout		2,079	30.7	
Liberal Democrats hold		Swing	▲13.1	

=== Holywell ===
Holywell
Party	Candidate	Votes	%	±%
Labour Co-op	Matt Turmaine*	949	53.2	▼12.4
Conservative	Sanjaya Pant	426	23.9	▲9.9
Liberal Democrats	Penelope Hill	360	20.2	▼0.2
TUSC	Mark O'Conner	49	2.7	New
Majority		523	29.3	N/A
Turnout		1,784	27.4	
Labour Co-op hold		Swing	▼11.1	

=== Leggatts ===
Leggatts
Party	Candidate	Votes	%	±%
Liberal Democrats	Shafiq Ahmed	952	44.3	▲11.8
Labour	Seamus Williams	790	36.7	▼13.9
Conservative	Jennie Raperport	355	16.5	▼0.4
TUSC	Derek Foster	54	2.5	New
Majority		162	7.5	N/A
Turnout		2,151	37.9	
Liberal Democrats gain from Labour		Swing	▲12.8	

=== Meriden ===
Meriden
Party	Candidate	Votes	%	±%
Liberal Democrats	Jennifer Pattinson	800	53.8	▲10.2
Labour	Helena Farrington	361	24.3	▼7.1
Conservative	Prashanth Elangovan	327	22.0	▼3.1
Majority		439	29.5	▲17.3
Turnout		1,488	26.31	
Liberal Democrats hold		Swing	▲8.6	

=== Nascot ===
Nascot
Party	Candidate	Votes	%	±%
Liberal Democrats	Tom Osborn	1,555	59.6	▲6.2
Conservative	Ravi Kura	629	24.1	▼1.6
Labour	Edward Tunnah	424	16.3	▼1.8
Majority		926	35.5	▲7.8
Turnout		2,608	39.1	
Liberal Democrats hold		Swing	▲3.9	

=== Oxhey ===
Oxhey
Party	Candidate	Votes	%	±%
Liberal Democrats	Kennedy Rodrigues	1,382	65.8	▲6.9
Conservative	William Hickey	360	17.1	▼6.3
Labour	Sue Sleeman	322	15.3	▼2.4
Reform	Neal Webber	37	1.8	New
Majority		1,022	48.6	▲13.2
Turnout		2,101	38.9	
Liberal Democrats hold		Swing	▲6.6	

=== Park ===
Park
Party	Candidate	Votes	%	±%
Liberal Democrats	Peter Kloss*	1,616	61.1	▲9.3
Conservative	Linda Topping	573	21.7	▼7.3
Labour	Sue Butler	457	17.3	▼0.4
Majority		1,043	39.4	▲16.6
Turnout		2,646	41.7	
Liberal Democrats hold		Swing	▲8.3	

=== Stanborough ===
Stanborough
Party	Candidate	Votes	%	±%
Liberal Democrats	Lenny Nembhard	909	50.8	▼12.0
Conservative	Peter Williams	530	29.6	▲10.2
Labour	Betty Muspratt	349	19.5	▲1.8
Majority		379	21.2	▼22.2
Turnout		1,788	31.9	
Liberal Democrats hold		Swing	▼11.1	

=== Tudor ===
Tudor
Party	Candidate	Votes	%	±%
Liberal Democrats	Stephen Johnson*	917	50.2	▲5.6
Labour	Diana Ivory	467	25.6	▼3.3
Conservative	Carly Bishop	442	24.2	▼2.3
Majority		450	24.6	▲8.9
Turnout		1,826	35.4	
Liberal Democrats hold		Swing	▲4.4	

=== Vicarage ===
Vicarage
Party	Candidate	Votes	%	±%
Labour	Nasreen Shah*	837	50.4	▼11.7
Liberal Democrats	Dan Thurlow	637	38.4	▲17.3
Conservative	Octavian Chirila Filip	186	11.2	▼5.6
Majority		200	12.0	▼29.0
Turnout		1,660	28.9	
Labour hold		Swing	▼14.5	

=== Woodside ===
Woodside
Party	Candidate	Votes	%	±%
Liberal Democrats	Glen Saffery*	802	51.2	▲8.1
Labour	Malcolm Bush	386	24.7	▼0.5
Conservative	Matthew Cawthorne	372	23.8	▼2.5
Majority		416	26.7	N/A
Turnout		1,560	27.3	
Liberal Democrats hold		Swing	▲4.3	

== Mayoral election ==
2022 Watford mayoral election
- 5 May 2022
- Turnout: 23,533
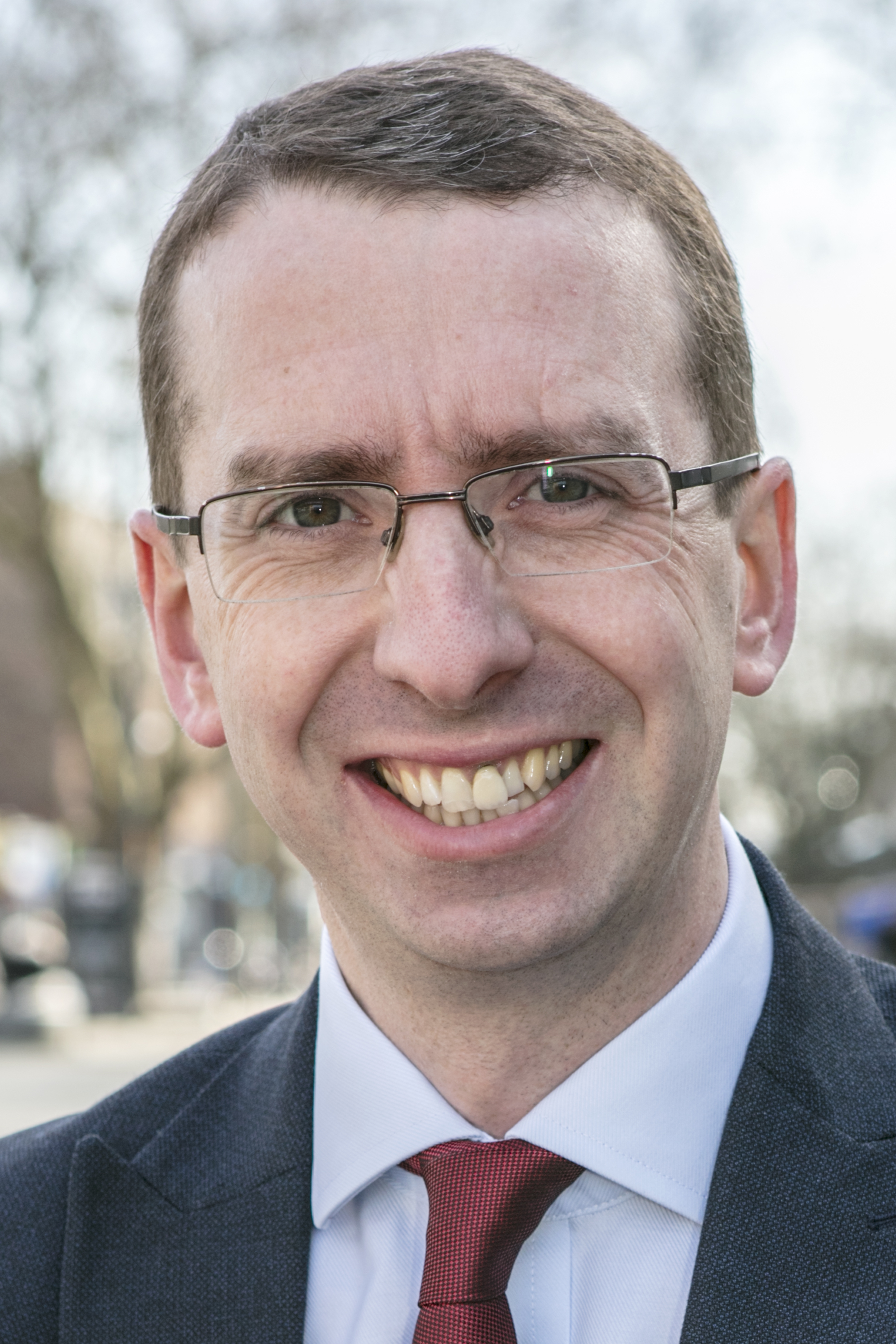
	First party	Second party	Third party
		Lab	Con
Candidate	Peter Taylor	Asif Khan	Binita Mehta-Parmar
Party	Liberal Democrats	Labour	Conservative
Popular vote	12,895	6,234	4,404
Percentage	54.8%	26.5%	18.7%
Swing	▲6.1 pp	▼7.3 pp	▲1.2 pp
Mayor before election
Peter Taylor
Liberal Democrat
Elected Mayor
Peter Taylor
Liberal Democrat

The Conservative Party announced Binita Mehta-Parmar as their mayoral candidate in August 2021. Mehta-Parmar was formerly the Conservative group leader on Watford Borough Council. Incumbent mayor Peter Taylor was unanimously reselected by the Liberal Democrats as their candidate in September 2021. He stated that his priorities would be "to create more jobs, make the town greener and support those most in need." The Labour Party selected Asif Khan as their candidate in November 2021. Khan is a councillor on Watford Borough Council and Hertfordshire County Council. He stated that he would focus on development in Watford, and was opposed to the number of high-rise buildings under construction.

2022 Watford mayoral election
Party	Candidate	1st round		2nd round			1st round votesTransfer votes, 2nd round
Party	Candidate	Total	Of round	Transfers	Total	Of round	1st round votesTransfer votes, 2nd round
Liberal Democrats	Peter Taylor	12,895	54.8%				
Labour	Asif Khan	6,234	26.5%				
Conservative	Binita Mehta-Parmar	4,404	18.7%				
Turnout		23,533					
Liberal Democrats hold							
