= 1995 Watford Borough Council election =

Watford Borough Council election

The 1995 Watford Borough Council election took place in 1995 to elect members of Watford Borough Council in England. This was the same day as other local elections.

== Results summary ==
1995 Watford Borough Council election
Party	This election			Full council			This election		
Party	Seats	Net	Seats %	Other	Total	Total %	Votes	Votes %	+/−
Labour	9	▲1	69.2	12	21	58.3	10,732	46.7	+10.0
Conservative	2	▼1	15.4	6	8	22.2	4,462	19.4	-5.3
Liberal Democrats	2	Steady	15.4	5	7	19.4	7,790	33.9	-4.7

== Ward results ==
=== Callowland ===
Callowland
Party	Candidate	Votes	%	±%
Labour	M. Cash	719	60.6	+8.4
Liberal Democrats	A. Vincent	324	27.3	−3.2
Conservative	G. Ogden	143	12.1	−5.1
Majority			33.3	
Turnout		1,186	31.0	
Labour hold		Swing	▲5.8	

=== Central ===
Central
Party	Candidate	Votes	%	±%
Labour	J. Dowdle	1,013	53.4	+13.9
Liberal Democrats	I. Roberts	704	37.1	−8.9
Conservative	P. Curtis	181	9.5	−5.0
Majority			16.3	
Turnout		1,898	42.0	
Labour hold		Swing	▲11.4	

=== Holywell ===
Holywell (2 seats due to by-election)
Party	Candidate	Votes	%
Labour	R. Bell	901	66.7
Labour	A. Head	819	60.7
Liberal Democrats	P. Curtis	269	19.9
Liberal Democrats	R. Laslett	236	17.5
Conservative	P. Jenkins	186	13.8
Conservative	K. Solomon	155	11.5
Turnout		1,350	30.0
Labour hold			
Labour hold			

=== Leggatts ===
Leggatts
Party	Candidate	Votes	%	±%
Labour	E. Muspratt	908	67.6	+18.6
Liberal Democrats	J. Richmond	265	19.7	−11.6
Conservative	A. Ranjit	170	12.7	−7.0
Majority			47.9	
Turnout		1,343	34.0	
Labour hold		Swing	▲15.1	

=== Meriden ===
Meriden
Party	Candidate	Votes	%	±%
Labour	N. Tyrwhitt	1,186	65.9	+12.0
Conservative	P. Bell	337	18.7	−6.3
Liberal Democrats	M. Lane	277	15.4	−5.7
Majority			47.2	
Turnout		1,800	33.0	
Labour hold		Swing	▲9.2	

=== Nascot ===
Nascot
Party	Candidate	Votes	%	±%
Conservative	I. Brown	889	45.8	+1.0
Liberal Democrats	P. Tilson	532	27.4	−6.7
Labour	T. Meldrum	519	26.8	+5.7
Majority			18.4	
Turnout		1,940	37.0	
Conservative hold		Swing	▲3.9	

=== Oxhey ===
Oxhey
Party	Candidate	Votes	%	±%
Liberal Democrats	I. Sharpe	923	53.2	−2.0
Labour	N. Bell	438	25.3	+10.7
Conservative	L. McQuaid	373	21.5	−8.7
Majority			28.0	
Turnout		1,734	37.0	
Liberal Democrats hold		Swing	▼6.4	

=== Park ===
Park
Party	Candidate	Votes	%	±%
Conservative	T. Williams	1,003	50.8	+1.3
Liberal Democrats	P. Jenkins	620	31.4	−3.6
Labour	R. England	351	17.8	+2.3
Majority			19.4	
Turnout		1,974	48.0	
Conservative hold		Swing	▲2.5	

=== Stanborough ===
Stanborough
Party	Candidate	Votes	%	±%
Liberal Democrats	A. Wylie	868	47.2	−9.4
Labour	C. Barry	605	32.9	+12.0
Conservative	J. Janson	367	19.9	−2.6
Majority			14.3	
Turnout		1,840	38.0	
Liberal Democrats hold		Swing	▼10.7	

=== Tudor ===
Tudor
Party	Candidate	Votes	%	±%
Labour	S. Ahrens	1,185	50.0	+2.7
Liberal Democrats	G. Burrow	892	37.7	+6.3
Conservative	M. Taylor	292	12.3	−9.0
Majority			12.4	
Turnout		2,369	47.0	
Labour gain from Conservative		Swing	▼1.8	

=== Vicarage ===
Vicarage
Party	Candidate	Votes	%	±%
Labour	G. Kelly	1,071	49.9	+0.8
Liberal Democrats	J. Baddeley	870	40.6	+7.1
Conservative	D. Ealey	204	9.5	−8.0
Majority			9.4	
Turnout		2,145	41.0	
Labour hold		Swing	▼3.2	

=== Woodside ===
Woodside
Party	Candidate	Votes	%	±%
Labour	J. Young	1,017	46.5	+7.1
Liberal Democrats	E. Burtenshaw	1,010	46.1	−4.2
Conservative	M. Bell	162	7.4	−2.9
Majority			0.3	
Turnout		2,189	45.0	
Labour hold		Swing	▲5.7	
