= Oxhey =

Suburb of Watford, Hertfordshire, England

Coordinates: 51.64705°N 0.37542°W

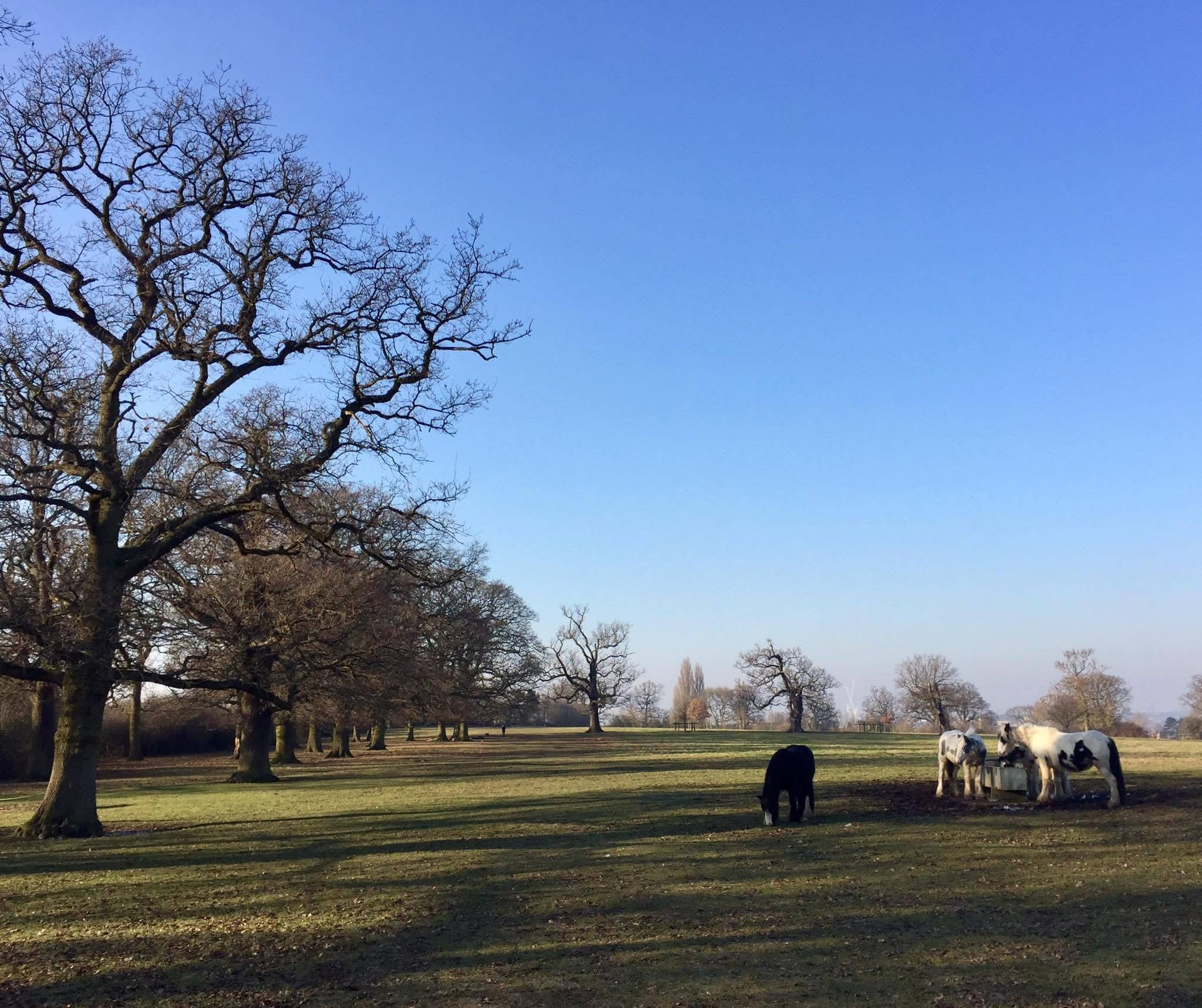
- Attenborough Fields

- Location within Hertfordshire
- Population: 7,200 (2021)
- OS grid reference: TQ125955
- District: Watford
- Shire county: Hertfordshire
- Region: East
- Country: England
- Sovereign state: United Kingdom
- Post town: Watford
- Postcode district: WD19
- Dialling code: 01923
- Police: Hertfordshire
- Fire: Hertfordshire
- Ambulance: East of England
- UK Parliament: Watford

Oxhey is a suburb of Watford, under the jurisdiction of the Watford Borough Council in the county of Hertfordshire, England. It is in the Oxhey ward of Watford Borough Council..

The wider locations which comprise the modern Oxhey area are Oxhey Village (the area around Bushey station and between Pinner Road and London Road) and Oxhey Hall (the area along Hampermill Lane towards Moor Park).

== Etymology ==
The name Oxhey is thought to derive from the Old English Oxanġehæġ. Ġehæġ is an Old English word meaning an enclosed piece of land, pasture, or meadow. Therefore, Oxhey can be understood to mean an enclosure, or fenced in place, for oxen. The first recorded reference to Oxhey was around 1390, although it may have been in use earlier.

== History ==
=== Early history ===
The earliest traces of human activity date from Stone and Iron ages. It is thought that the Roman Akeman Street may have run close to what is now the A411 Chalk Hill and London Road.

The first mentions of Oxhey by name are in the eighth century when King Offa gave Oxangehæge to the Benedictine Abbey of St Albans.

The pattern of early settlement in the area would have been partly influenced by its geographical position, given proximity to the road north from London, and its contacts with St Albans Abbey.

=== Industrial Revolution ===
Oxhey grew during the mid-19th century with the coming of the London and Birmingham Railway from London Euston to Boxmoor in 1837, the settlement being developed to house railway workers. The line was completed to Birmingham in 1838. The fast-developing town of Watford, which later absorbed Oxhey, would in due course, would also become a dominant factor in the area's growth.

Oxhey was initially called 'New Bushey', after the well-established village a mile away. However, the Local Government Act 1894 saw built-up areas become ‘'Urban Districts' while less built-up portions became ‘Rural Districts.’

This led to Bushey parish being split into Bushey Urban – then within Watford Urban – and Bushey Rural for the remainder. This created an oddity that New Bushey was in Watford as so the legislation created the need to rename the area. As such, Bushey Urban was renamed ‘Oxhey’ on 1st April 1906. On 1 April 1935 Oxhey was abolished and merged with Watford.

In 1931 the parish had a population of 2,636.

Oxhey Grange in Oxhey Lane was built in 1876 by architect William Young (1843–1900) in the High Victorian Gothic style. It is a Grade II listed building.

== Culture ==
=== Community groups ===
Residents are represented by local community group Oxhey Village Environment Group, colloquially known as OVEG. Founded in 1974, OVEG is a non-political, non-profit residents’ group run by volunteers, which aims to "maintain, protect and enhance the character and environment of Oxhey Village and its surroundings." The group takes action on local issues, such as major planning applications, and operates a number of community events including an annual summer fair and Brewfest; an annual beer festival.

OVEG’s former committee members include Baroness Thornhill; a former mayor of Watford, and the first female directly elected mayor in the United Kingdom.

=== Sport and leisure ===
Oxhey has a non-League football team Oxhey Jets F.C. who play at the Boundary Stadium.

Oxhey Park Golf Club is a public pay & play course that used to be an 18-hole course built on land owned by the Blackwell family in 1910, who then sold the estate to London County Council in 1946, who made it a municipal course in 1947 with a par of 78, but it was closed in 1954. It subsequently became a 9-hole course.

=== Places of worship ===
Oxhey's parish church is St Matthew's, a Grade II listed building dating from 1880 in Gothic Revival style with some elements of early Art Nouveau decoration. The church also features a Karl Parsons window in the Lady Chapel.

=== Public houses ===
Watford has a long historical association with beer and brewing. At one point, the Oxhey and neighbouring Bushey area was served by as many as 25 pubs.

Today, Oxhey Village is served by six public houses:

- The Load of Hay
- The Railway Arms
- The Rifle Volunteer
- The Royal Oak
- The Victoria
- The Villiers Arms

=== Education ===
- Bromet Primary School
- Bushey and Oxhey Infant School

The nearest secondary schools are Grange Academy, which sits just outside the ward boundaries, and Queens' School in Bushey.

== Transport ==
=== Rail ===
Bushey station viewed from Pinner Road entrance

Bushey station is a London Overground and Network Rail station in London fare zone 8; it has direct links to London Euston station and Watford Junction station.

The station is served by London Northwestern Railway semi-fast trains on the West Coast Main Line, and by London Overground services on the Watford DC line, a slow local service along the West Coast route.

It is an oddity that the station, which serves both Oxhey and the town of Bushey a mile away, is situated on the edge of Oxhey Village and yet is called Bushey Station. The original name of the station was 'Bushey', it was renamed 'Bushey & Oxhey' when Oxhey Village was renamed, and was then renamed again in 1974.

=== Bus ===
The area is served by London Bus routes 142 and 258. It also served by Intalink routes 306, 328, 346, 602, R16 and R17

== Oxhey Park ==
Path by the River Colne in Oxhey Park

Oxhey Park is a large public space located in Oxhey. Founded in 1924 by recently established Watford Borough Council, the park comprises approximately 14 hectares of parkland with a wooded dell and rolling grassy slopes.

The site lies between Eastbury Road, Deacons Hill and the West Coast Main Line at Bushey Arches.

In 2020, a new Oxhey Activity Park was opened within the site, including a skate park and a cafe. The redeveloped activity park subsequently won the 'Excellence in Public Health and Wellbeing' prize at the 2021 Landscape Institute Awards.

Oxhey Park - and Oxhey Activity Park - were named amongst ten parks that received the 2022 Green Flag People's Choice Awards.

== Notable people ==
- Vinnie Jones, actor and former footballer
- Baroness Dorothy Thornhill of Watford, former Mayor of Watford
- Robert Cawdron, actor
- Shirley Eaton, actress
- Mary Pownall Bromet, sculptor and former president of the Society of Women Artists
- Reginald 'Rex' Warneford, British poilot and recipient of the Victoria Cross for air-bombing a Zeppelin during the First World War.
- Alex Lowe, English actor, comedian and voice artist, best known for portraying Barry from Watford and Clinton Baptiste
- Wilf Sobey, English international rugby union player and headmaster of Kingsfield School in Oxhey Village
