= Peter Taylor (mayor) =

English politician

Mayor Peter Taylor
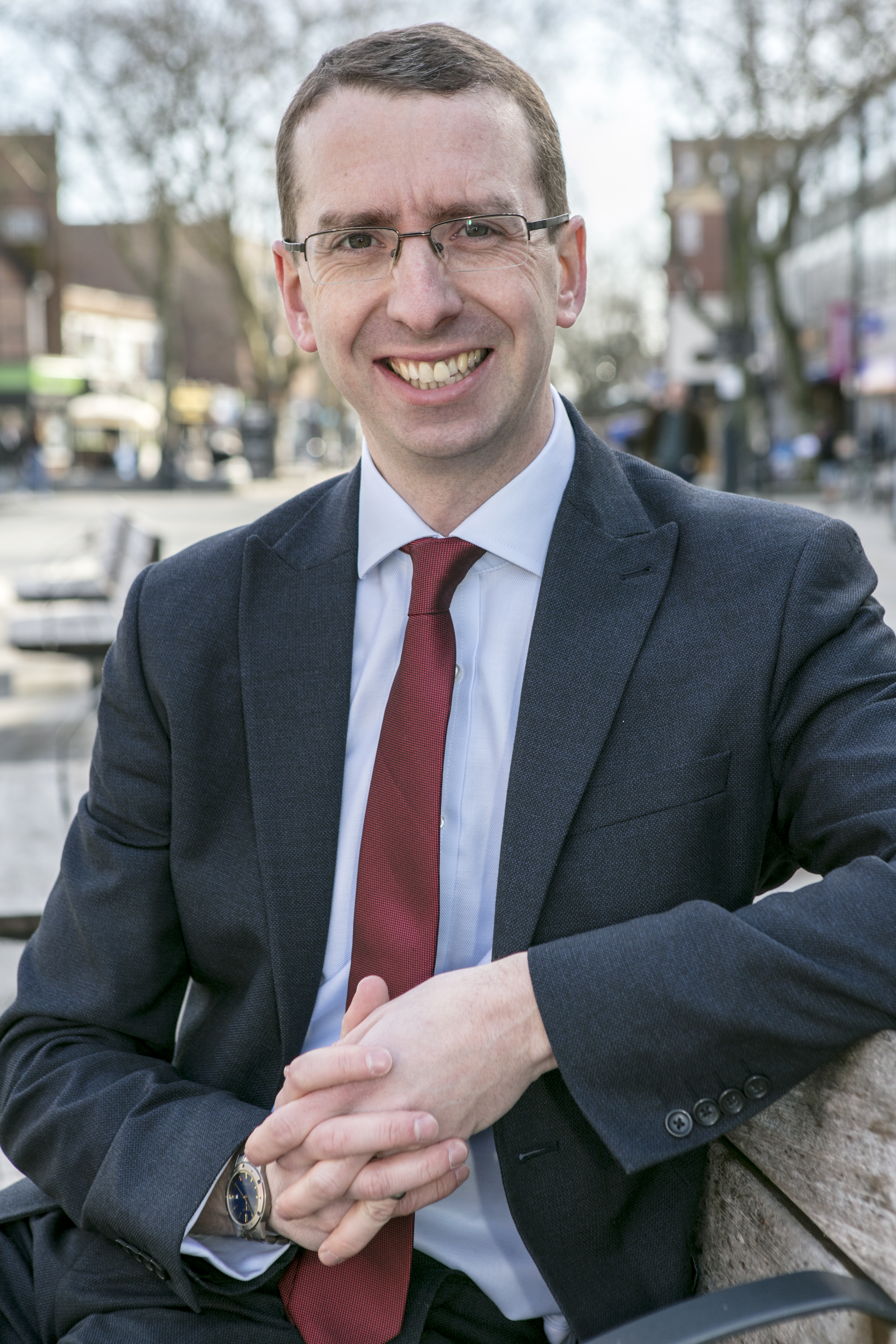
- Taylor in 2018

Mayor of Watford
- Incumbent
- Assumed office 7 May 2018
- Preceded by: Dorothy Thornhill
- Majority: 9,611 (34.6%)

Member of Hertfordshire County Council for Central Watford and Oxhey
- Incumbent
- Assumed office 2 May 2025
- Preceded by: Stephen Giles-Medhurst
- Majority: 1,311 (39.3%)

Member of Watford Borough Council for Oxhey
- In office 7 May 2012 – 7 May 2018
- Preceded by: Anthony Poole
- Succeeded by: Imran Hamid

Personal details
- Born: 29 April 1980 (age 46) Preston, Yorkshire, England
- Party: Liberal Democrats
- Spouse: Rachel
- Children: 3
- Education: University of Edinburgh (MA)

Peter Colin Taylor (born 29 April 1980) is a British Liberal Democrat politician who has served as Mayor of Watford since 2018, succeeding Dorothy Thornhill. He was re-elected as mayor in 2022 and 2026. Taylor has also served as the Hertfordshire County Councillor for Central Watford and Oxhey since 2025. He was a Watford Borough Councillor for Oxhey ward from 2012 until his election as Mayor in 2018. Taylor is also the Liberal Democrat parliamentary candidate for Watford in the next general election.

== Early life and career ==
Taylor was born in Preston, Yorkshire, on 29 April 1980. His father was a computer systems programmer for Midland Bank (now HSBC) and his mother was a childminder. He has three siblings. Taylor's family moved to Sheffield when he was seven, where he attended Notre Dame Catholic High School. He graduated with a Master of Arts degree in economics and politics from the University of Edinburgh. After graduation, he taught economics at St Dominic's Sixth Form College in Harrow on the Hill. He continued to work in the education sector as assistant director of education for the Catholic Education Service, representing thousands of Catholic schools in England and Wales, until his election as Mayor of Watford.

== Political career ==
Taylor worked as a research assistant for Alistair Carmichael, Liberal Democrat MP for Orkney and Shetland, from December 2002 to August 2007.

=== Borough Councillor ===
Taylor was elected as a Liberal Democrat councillor for Oxhey ward in the 2012 Watford Borough Council election, with a majority of 757 votes. He served in then-mayor Dorothy Thornhill's cabinet as deputy mayor and cabinet member for client services, overseeing the town's parks, leisure centres, bin collections and theatres. He was re-elected as a councillor in 2016.

=== Mayor of Watford ===
Taylor was selected as the Liberal Democrat candidate for Mayor of Watford in the 2018 mayoral election, which he won with 48.7% of the vote in the first round and 61.6% in the second. Watford Borough Council, led by Taylor, launched a bike hire scheme in collaboration with Beryl in March 2020. That July, the council partnered with Arriva to launch a Watford operation of the company's on-demand bus service ArrivaClick, which ran until December 2023, when Arriva ended it citing low passenger numbers. He was re-elected as Mayor in 2022, winning 54.8% of the vote in the first round which bypassed the need for a second round. He ran for a third term in 2026 and won re-election with 52.5% of the vote.

=== County Councillor ===
Taylor was the Liberal Democrat candidate for Central Watford and Oxhey in the 2025 Hertfordshire County Council election. He won the seat with a majority of 1,311 votes.

=== Parliamentary campaign ===
In October 2026, Taylor was selected as the Liberal Democrat candidate for Watford in the next general election.

== Personal life ==
Taylor lives in Oxhey with his wife Rachel and their three children.

== Electoral performance ==
=== Mayor of Watford ===
2026 Watford mayoral election
Party	Candidate	Votes	%	±%
Liberal Democrats	Peter Taylor	14,583	52.5	−2.3
Reform	Mark Dixon	4,972	17.9	New
Green	Jake Mitchell	3,084	11.1	New
Labour	Keith Morgan	2,742	9.9	−16.6
Conservative	Abdul Laskar	1,915	6.9	−11.8
UK Voice	Ketankumar Pipaliya	280	1.0	New
Independent	Ryan Bonar	192	0.7	New
Majority		9,611	34.6	+28.3
Turnout		27,768	37.2	+3.8
Liberal Democrats hold		Swing	–2.3	

2022 Watford mayoral election
Party	Candidate	1st round		2nd round			1st round votesTransfer votes, 2nd round
Party	Candidate	Total	Of round	Transfers	Total	Of round	1st round votesTransfer votes, 2nd round
Liberal Democrats	Peter Taylor	12,895	54.8%				
Labour Co-op	Asif Khan	6,234	26.5%				
Conservative	Binita Mehta-Parmar	4,404	18.7%				
Turnout			33.36				
Liberal Democrats hold							

2018 Watford mayoral election
Party	Candidate	1st round		2nd round			1st round votesTransfer votes, 2nd round
Party	Candidate	Total	Of round	Transfers	Total	Of round	1st round votesTransfer votes, 2nd round
Liberal Democrats	Peter Taylor	13,274	48.7%	2,657	15,931	61.6%	
Labour	Jagtar Dhindsa	9,223	33.8%	728	9,951	38.4%	
Conservative	George Jabbour	4,787	17.5%				
Turnout			39.27				
Liberal Democrats hold							

=== Hertfordshire County Council ===
2025 Hertfordshire County Council election: Central Watford and Oxhey
Party	Candidate	Votes	%	±%
Liberal Democrats	Peter Taylor	1,850	55.4	+6.6
Reform	Neal Webber	539	16.1	+14.6
Labour	Sonu Masania	430	12.9	–10.5
Conservative	Peter Williams	283	8.5	–10.9
Green	Matt Jones	206	6.2	–0.6
TUSC	James O'Connor	33	1.0	N/A
Majority		1,311	39.3	+13.9
Turnout		3,341	25.3	–8.7
Registered electors		13,196		
Liberal Democrats hold		Swing	–4.0	

=== Watford Borough Council ===
2016 Watford Borough Council election: Oxhey ward (3 seats)
Party	Candidate	Votes	%	±%
Liberal Democrats	Iain Sharpe	1,307		
Liberal Democrats	Peter Taylor	1,256		
Liberal Democrats	Joanna Maestas	1,247		
Labour	Deborah Marchant	338		
Labour	Sue Sleeman	312		
Conservative	Haydon Chart	308		
Conservative	Dina Bhudia	275		
Labour	Stephen Vincent	243		
Green	Matthew Hale	231		
Conservative	Gail Martin	230		
TUSC	Mark O'Connor	69		
Turnout				
Liberal Democrats hold		Swing		
Liberal Democrats hold		Swing		
Liberal Democrats hold		Swing		

2012 Watford Borough Council election: Oxhey ward
Party	Candidate	Votes	%	±%
Liberal Democrats	Peter Taylor	1,058	63.2	+8.0
Conservative	Dick Bamford	301	18.0	−4.7
Labour	Sue Sleeman	244	14.6	−1.7
Green	Eric Weatherly	72	4.3	−1.6
Majority		757	45.2	
Turnout		1,675	32.01	
Liberal Democrats hold		Swing		
