= Dorothy Thornhill, Baroness Thornhill =

British politician (born 1955)

The Right Honourable The Baroness Thornhill MBE
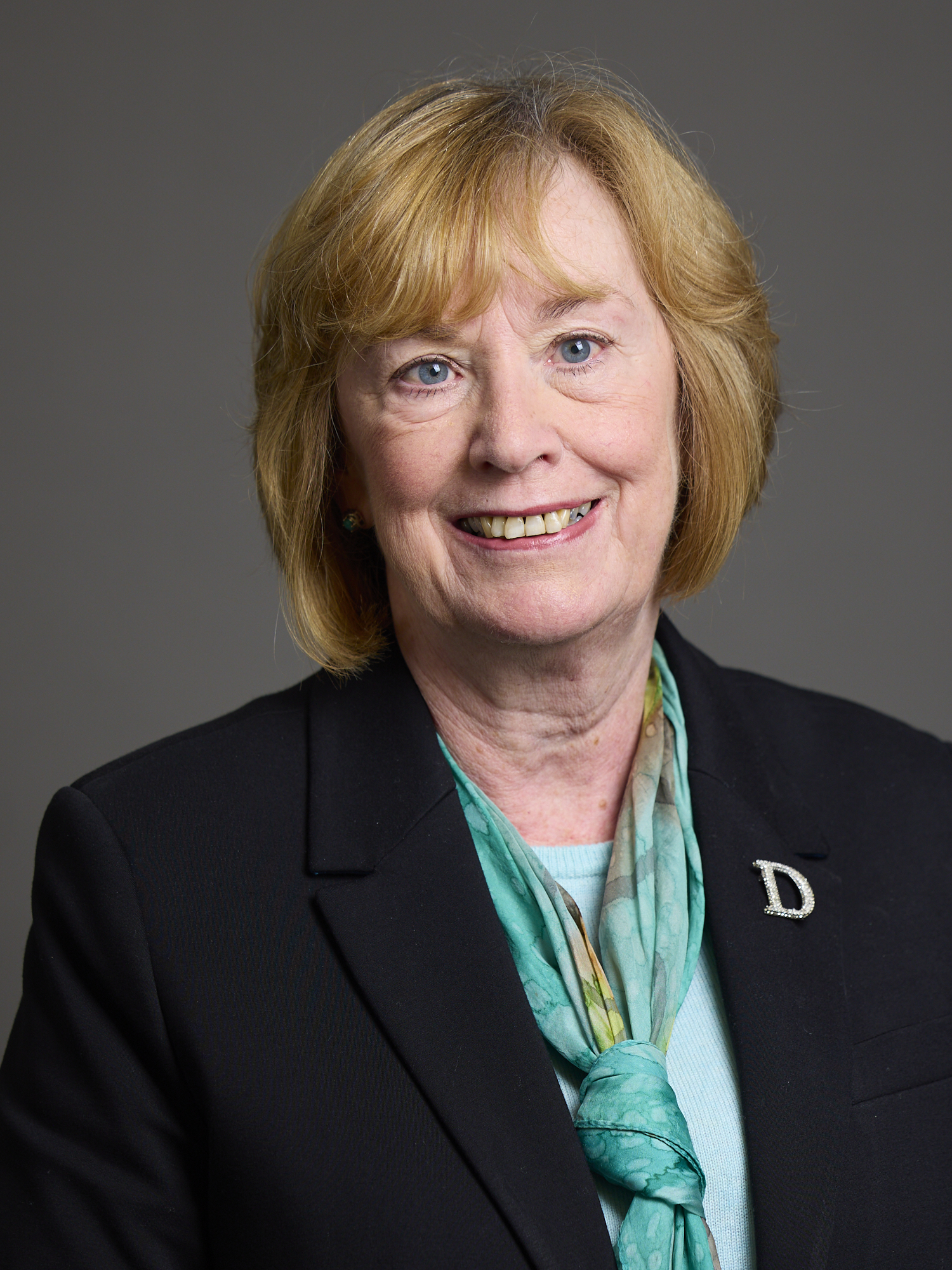
- Official portrait, 2024

Mayor of Watford
- In office 6 May 2002 – 6 May 2018
- Preceded by: Office created
- Succeeded by: Peter Taylor

Member of the House of Lords
- Lord Temporal
- Life peerage 21 October 2015

Personal details
- Born: 26 May 1955 (age 71) Tenby, Pembrokeshire, Wales
- Party: Liberal Democrats
- Spouse: Iain Sharpe
- Website: (as archived November 2009)

Dorothy Thornhill, Baroness Thornhill, MBE (born 26 May 1955) is a British politician, who was the first directly elected local mayors of Watford, Hertfordshire, England. She was the Liberal Democrats' first directly elected mayor, and was also the first female directly elected mayor in the United Kingdom. She served as Mayor of Watford from May 2002 until May 2018. She was nominated for a life peerage in August 2015.

== Political career ==
In May 2002, Thornhill became the first elected mayor of Watford Borough with a majority of over 8,000 after second choice votes were counted.

Thornhill increased her majority when she was re-elected as mayor in May 2006, gaining more than 50% of the vote in the first round and a majority of over 7,000.

Thornhill was ranked the 41st most influential Liberal Democrat in the country, in an article by The Daily Telegraph. They stated:

"Dorothy Thornhill overcame tough opposition to become the first directly LibDem mayor in 2002 and she was re-elected in 2006. Watford is a target seat for the 'LibDems' at the next election and her tenure as mayor will prove crucial to their fortunes."

At a Liberal Democrat town hall meeting in Watford, in February 2010, the leader of the party, Nick Clegg was asked whether he felt the Mayor was right to earn the same wage as a member of parliament whether she was "value for money", and in response he named her "one of the best mayors in this country".

Thornhill was re-elected in May 2010, for a third term in office, with a majority of 11,921, becoming the second directly elected local mayor in the UK to do so. She was appointed a Member of the Order of the British Empire (MBE) in the 2011 Birthday Honours.

In 2015, Watford Borough Council lost a legal battle to evict allotment holders from the Terrace Farm allotments in Watford.

Thornhill stood for the Watford constituency in the parliamentary elections on 7 May 2015 as the Liberal Democrat candidate. She won 10,152 votes compared to the Labour candidate's 14,606 and the Conservative candidate's 24,400.

On 21 October 2015, she was created a life peer as Baroness Thornhill, of Watford in the County of Hertfordshire. She decided not to stand in the 2018 mayoral election and was succeeded by fellow Liberal Democrat Peter Taylor.

As a Liberal Democrat peer, Thornhill led the party's internal review into their performance in the 2019 general election, which was published in May 2020.

She ranked 15 out of 50 on the Top 50 Influential Lib Dems of 2020 list.

== Personal life ==
Thornhill was assistant head teacher at Queens' School in Bushey for several years and had a teaching career spanning over 25 years.

Thornhill lives in the Oxhey area of Watford, where she was a borough councillor for several years. She states on the Watford Council website "In my spare time I enjoy spending time with friends and family, reading, watching rugby and football and visiting old churches" and she describes herself as "an avid viewer of Coronation Street". She is an Honorary Vice-President of Watford Football Club. Thornhill is married to Iain Sharpe, a Liberal Democrat councillor for Oxhey on Watford Borough Council.

In 2023, Thornhill was fined and disqualified from holding or obtaining a driving licence for 6 months for speeding on Hempstead Road in Watford.

Civic offices
New creation	Mayor of Watford; 2002–2018	Succeeded by Peter Taylor
