= Watford Borough Council =

Local authority for Watford, England

Coordinates: 51.655°N 0.398°W

Type
- Type: Non-metropolitan district

Leadership
- Chair: Sohail Bashir, Liberal Democrat since 19 May 2026
- Mayor: Peter Taylor, Liberal Democrats since 7 May 2018
- Chief Executive: Donna Nolan since 2019

Structure
- Seats: 36 councillors plus elected mayor
- Political groups: Administration (33) Liberal Democrats (32+1) Other parties (4) Labour (4)

Elections
- Voting system: Plurality voting system
- Last election: May 2026
- Next election: May 2027

Meeting place
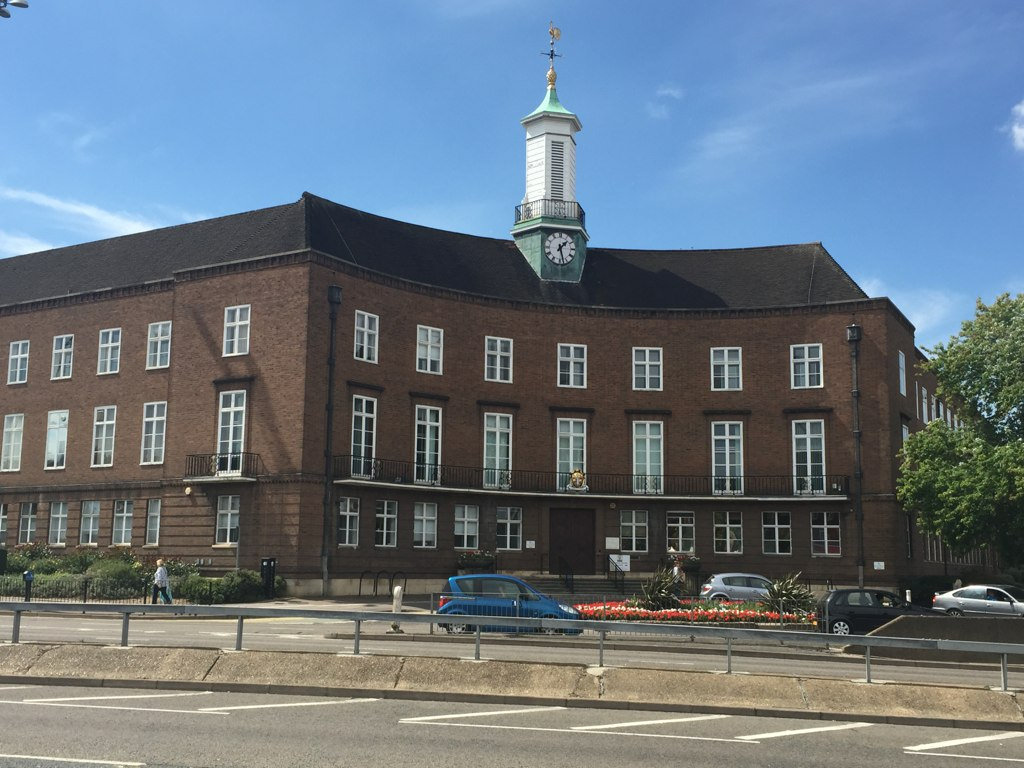
- Town Hall, Hempstead Road, Watford, WD17 3EX

Website
- www.watford.gov.uk

Watford Borough Council is the local authority for the Watford non-metropolitan district in the south-west of Hertfordshire, England. The council is based in the Town Hall on Hempstead Road. The council comprises 36 councillors plus a directly elected mayor.

== History ==
Watford's first elected council was a local board established in 1850, prior to which the town had been administered by the parish vestries. Such local boards were converted into urban district councils in 1894. Watford Urban District was granted borough status in 1922, allowing the chair of the council to take the title of mayor. The Local Government Act 1972 reconstituted Watford as a non-metropolitan district with effect from 1 April 1974; it kept the same boundaries and its borough status, but there were changes to the council's responsibilities.

== Responsibilities ==
Hertfordshire has a two-tier structure of local government, with the ten district councils (including Watford Borough Council) providing district-level services, and Hertfordshire County Council providing county-level services.

Watford Borough Council's responsibilities include:

- Benefits - Housing and Council Tax
- Car Parking
- Concessionary Travel
- Council Tax - Administration and Collection
- Elections and Electoral Registration
- Environmental Health
- Food Safety and Hygiene Complaints
- Noise Pollution and Pest Control
- Housing Administration
- Licensing
- Caravan Sites
- Town Planning
- Public Conveniences
- Health and Leisure Centres
- Refuse Collection
- Recycling
- Tourism and Visitor Information

== Political control ==
The Liberal Democrats have held Watford's elected mayoralty since 2002 and have had a majority of the seats on the council since 2003.

The first elections to the borough council as reformed under the Local Government Act 1972 were held in 1973, initially acting as a shadow authority until the new arrangements took effect on 1 April 1974. Political control of the council since 1974 has been as follows:

Party in control	Years
Labour	1974–1988
No overall control	1988–1990
Labour	1990–2000
No overall control	2000–2003
Liberal Democrats	2003–present

=== Leadership ===
Prior to 2002, political leadership was provided by the leader of the council, and the mayor was a more ceremonial position. The last leader of the council from 1995 was:

Councillor	Party	From	To
Vince Muspratt	Labour	1995	5 May 2002

In 2002 the council changed to having a directly-elected mayor as the political leader, following a referendum the year before. Vince Muspratt stood as Labour's candidate in the first mayoral election in 2002 but was defeated by the Liberal Democrat candidate, Dorothy Thornhill. The directly-elected mayors of Watford since 2002 have been: (Note: Mayoral terms of office run from the fourth day after election day.)

Mayor	Party	From	To
Dorothy Thornhill	Liberal Democrats	6 May 2002	6 May 2018
Peter Taylor	Liberal Democrats	7 May 2018	

=== Composition ===
There are 37 seats on the council, being 36 councillors plus the elected mayor. Following the 2026 election the composition of the council is as follows (excluding the Liberal Democrat mayor):

Party	Seats
Liberal Democrats	32
Labour	4
Total	36

The next elections are due to be held in May 2027.

== Premises ==
The council is based at Watford Town Hall on Hempstead Road at the northern end of the town centre. The building was purpose-built for the council in 1939.

== Elections ==
Since the last boundary changes in 2016 the council has comprised 36 councillors (in addition to the elected mayor), representing 12 wards, each of which elects three councillors. Elections are held three years out of every four, electing one councillor from each ward each time. Elections to Hertfordshire County Council are held in the fourth year of the cycle when there are no borough council elections.

=== Wards ===
The wards of the borough are:

- Callowland
- Central
- Holywell
- Leggatts
- Meriden
- Nascot
- Oxhey
- Park
- Stanborough
- Tudor
- Vicarage
- Woodside

== Arms ==
Coat of arms of Watford Borough Council

Notes
Granted 16 October 1922.
Escutcheon
Gules on a pale wavy Argent between two escallops Or a pallet wavy Azure charged with a fasces erect of the second on a chief of the third a hurt charged with a saltire also of the third between two harts statant of the first.
Motto
Audentior (Be Bold)
