= Mayor of Watford =

- Coat of arms of the Borough of Watford

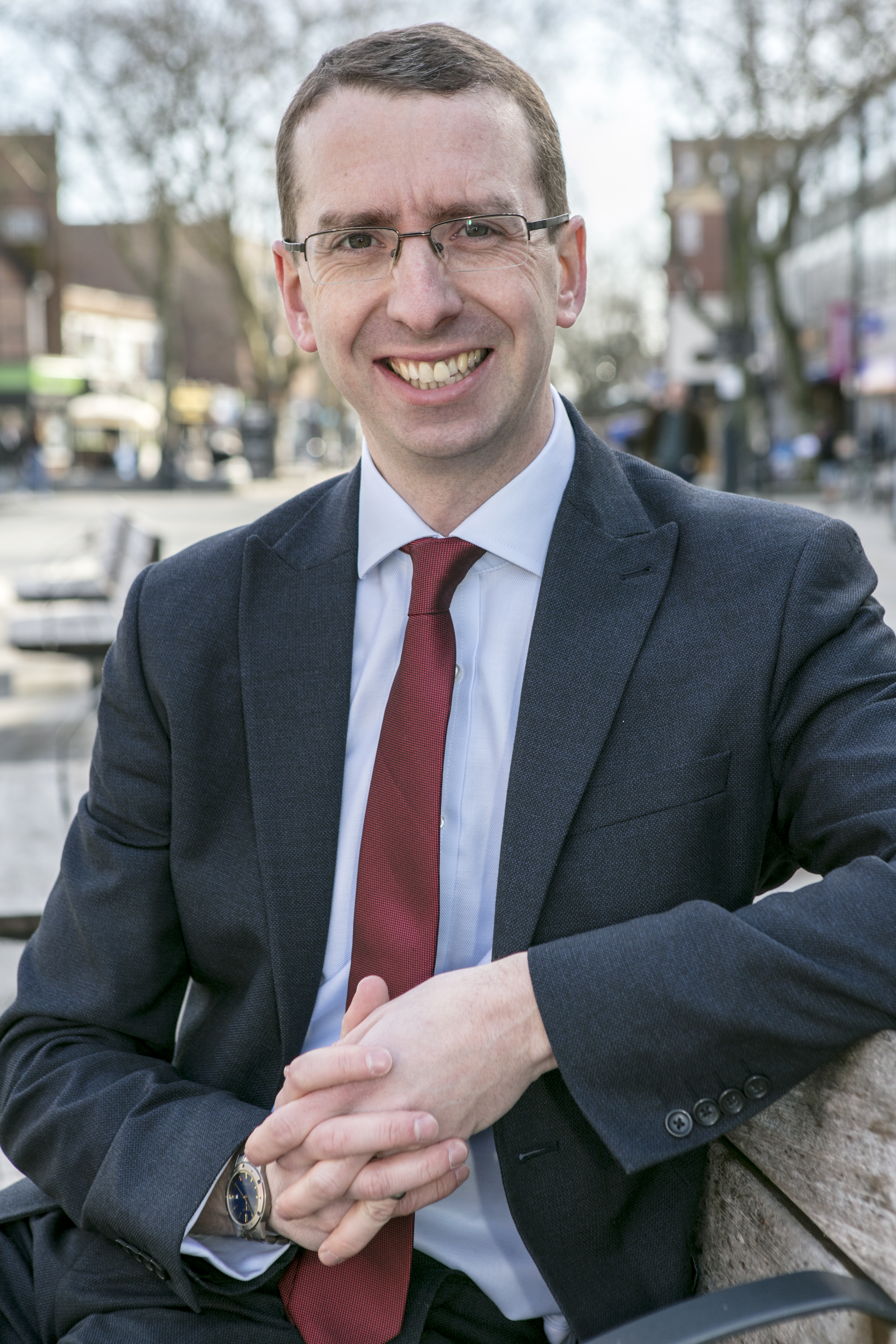
- Incumbent; Peter Taylor since 7 May 2018
- Style: No courtesy title or style
- Appointer: Electorate of Watford
- Term length: Four years
- Inaugural holder: Dorothy Thornhill (May 2002)
- Succession: Quadrennial

The mayor of Watford is a directly elected local authority mayor and the head of the borough council of Watford, Hertfordshire, England. The holder of the position is a directly elected mayor using the supplementary vote every four years. The current mayor of Watford is Peter Taylor, who was elected in May 2018 for the Liberal Democrats.

== History ==
Dorothy Thornhill was the first directly elected mayor of Watford; she was elected in May 2002. Thornhill was the first female directly elected mayor in England and the Liberal Democrats' first directly elected mayor. She was re-elected in May 2006, May 2010 and May 2014.

In the 2018 election, Peter Taylor, also member of the Liberal Democrats, was elected as Mayor of Watford.

== List of Mayors ==
Name	Portrait	Term of office		Elected	Political party
Dorothy Thornhill		6 May 2002	6 May 2018	2002; 2006; 2010; 2014	Liberal Democrats
Peter Taylor		7 May 2018	Incumbent	2018; 2022	Liberal Democrats

== Referendum ==
Mayor of Watford referendum 12 July 2001
Choice	Votes	%
Elected Mayor	7,636	51.68
Cabinet System	7,140	48.32
Required majority		50
Total	14,776	100.00
Registered voters/turnout		24.5
Source: House of Commons Library

== Election results ==
The position was established after a referendum in 2001 and the first election was held in 2002.

=== 2002 ===
Watford Mayoral Election 2 May 2002
Party	Candidate	1st round		2nd round			1st round votesTransfer votes, 2nd round
Party	Candidate	Total	Of round	Transfers	Total	Of round	1st round votesTransfer votes, 2nd round
Liberal Democrats	Dorothy Thornhill	10,954	49.4%	2,519	13,473	71.9%	
Labour	Vince Muspratt	4,899	22.1%	370	5,269	28.1%	
Conservative	Gary Ling	4,746	21.4%				
Green	Stephen Rackett	851	3.8%				
Socialist Alliance	Paul Woodward	390	1.8%				
Fat Cat	Tristram Cooke	330	1.5%				
Liberal Democrats win							

=== 2006 ===
Watford Mayoral Election 4 May 2006
Party	Candidate	1st round		2nd round			1st round votesTransfer votes, 2nd round
Party	Candidate	Total	Of round	Transfers	Total	Of round	1st round votesTransfer votes, 2nd round
Liberal Democrats	Dorothy Thornhill	11,963	51.2%				
Conservative	Stephen O'Brien	4,838	20.7%				
Labour	Ruth Ellis	4,062	17.4%				
Green	Stephen Rackett	2,522	10.8%				
Liberal Democrats hold							

=== 2010 ===
Watford Mayoral Election 6 May 2010
Party	Candidate	1st round		2nd round			1st round votesTransfer votes, 2nd round
Party	Candidate	Total	Of round	Transfers	Total	Of round	1st round votesTransfer votes, 2nd round
Liberal Democrats	Dorothy Thornhill	19,153	45.9%	4,276	23,429	67.1%	
Conservative	Stephen Johnson	10,403	24.9%	1,105	11,508	32.9%	
Labour	Nigel Bell	10,029	24.0%				
Green	Alex MacGregor-Mason	2,173	5.2%				
Liberal Democrats hold							

=== 2014 ===
Watford Mayoral Election 22 May 2014
Party	Candidate	1st round		2nd round			1st round votesTransfer votes, 2nd round
Party	Candidate	Total	Of round	Transfers	Total	Of round	1st round votesTransfer votes, 2nd round
Liberal Democrats	Dorothy Thornhill	11,741	45.90%	2,452	14,193	65.4%	
Labour	Jagtar Dhindsa	6,577	25.71%	927	7,504	34.6%	
UKIP	Philip Cox	3,789	14.81%				
Conservative	Linda Topping	3,470	13.57%				
Liberal Democrats hold							

=== 2018 ===
Watford Mayoral Election 3 May 2018
Party	Candidate	1st round		2nd round			1st round votesTransfer votes, 2nd round
Party	Candidate	Total	Of round	Transfers	Total	Of round	1st round votesTransfer votes, 2nd round
Liberal Democrats	Peter Taylor	13,274	48.7%	2,657	15,931	61.6%	
Labour	Jagtar Dhindsa	9,223	33.8%	728	9,951	38.4%	
Conservative	George Jabbour	4,787	17.5%				
Liberal Democrats hold							

=== 2022 ===
Watford Mayoral Election 5 May 2022
Party	Candidate	1st round		2nd round			1st round votesTransfer votes, 2nd round
Party	Candidate	Total	Of round	Transfers	Total	Of round	1st round votesTransfer votes, 2nd round
Liberal Democrats	Peter Taylor	12,895	54.8%				
Labour Co-op	Asif Khan	6,234	26.5%				
Conservative	Binita Mehta-Parmar	4,404	18.7%				
Liberal Democrats hold							
