= 2014 United Kingdom local elections =

- 22 May 2014

All 32 London boroughs, all 36 metropolitan boroughs, 19 out of 55 unitary authorities, 74 out of 201 district councils, all 11 Northern Irish councils, and 5 directly elected mayors
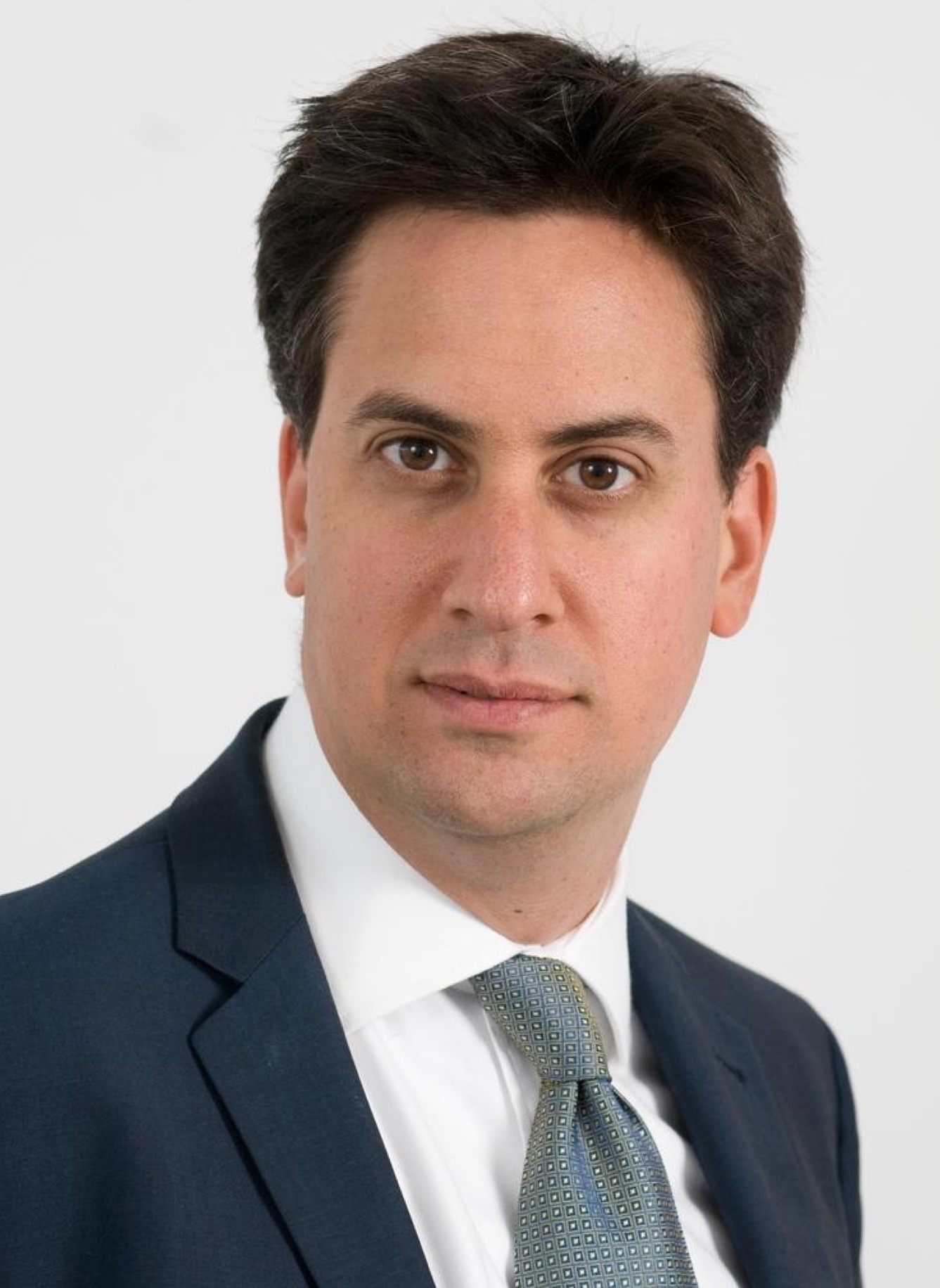

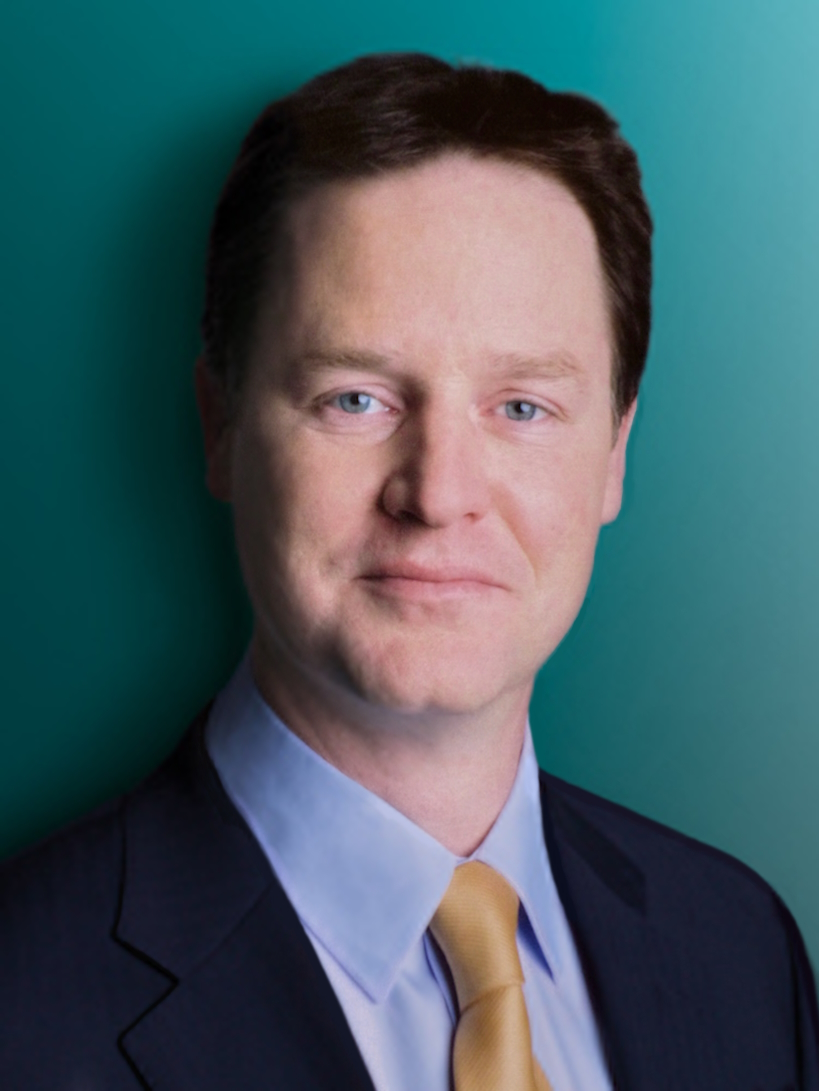

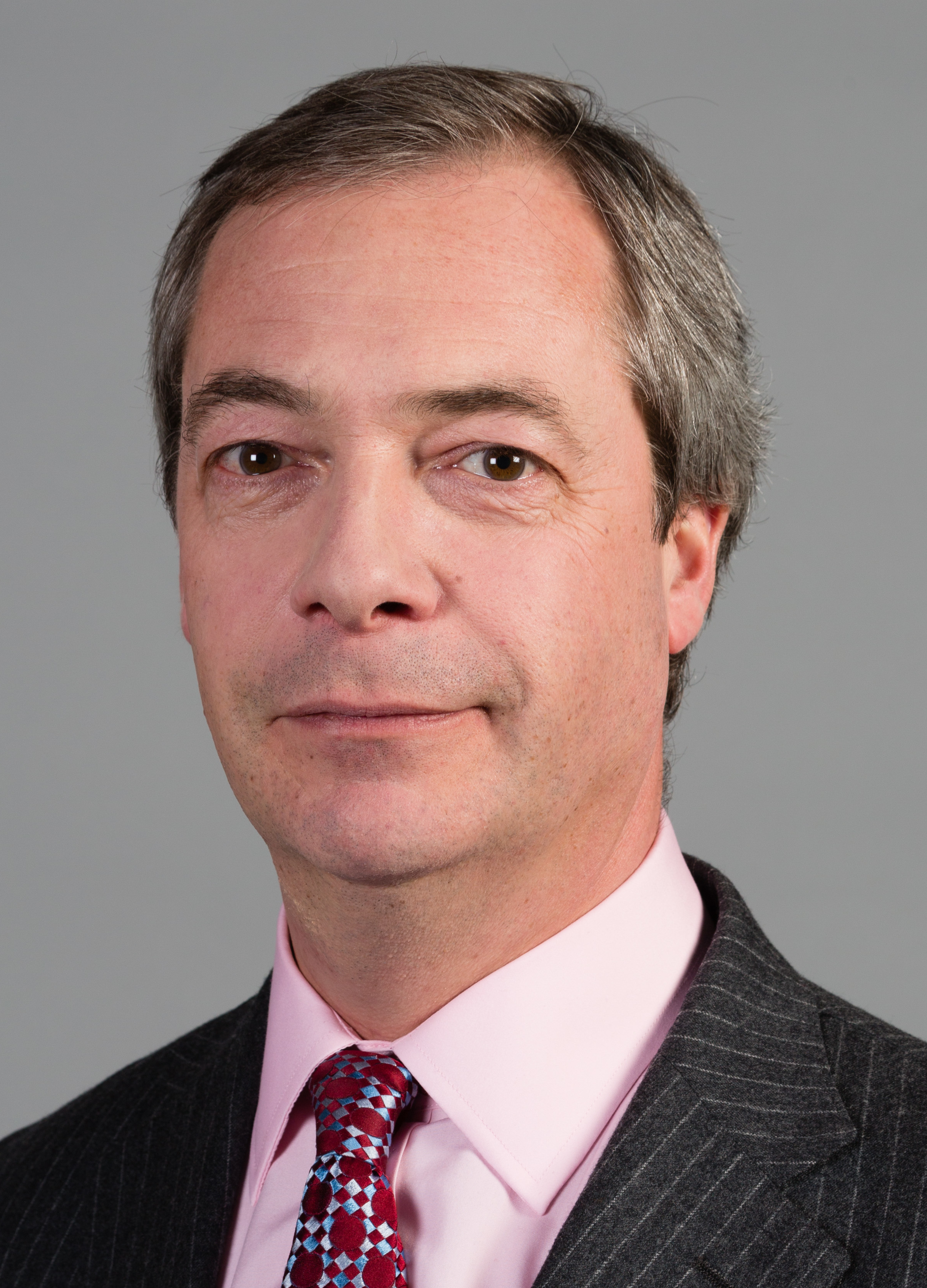
	First party	Second party
Leader	Ed Miliband	David Cameron
Party	Labour	Conservative
Leader since	25 September 2010	6 December 2005
Projected vote-share (Note: All vote shares in the infobox are projected national vote shares calculated by the BBC.)	31%	29%
Swing (Note: Swing figures are between the BBC national projected vote share extrapolation from 2013 local elections, and the BBC equivalent vote share projection from these local elections held in different areas)	▲2%	▲4%
Councils	82	41
Councils +/–	▲6	▼11
Councillors	2,121	1,364
Councillors +/–	▲324	▼236
	Third party	Fourth party
Leader	Nick Clegg	Nigel Farage
Party	Liberal Democrats	UKIP
Leader since	18 December 2007	5 November 2010
Projected vote-share	13%	17%
Swing	▼1%	▼5%
Councils	6	0
Councils +/–	▼2	Steady
Councillors	427	166 (Note: England: 163 councillors (+161 net). Northern Ireland: 3 councillors (+2 net))
Councillors +/–	▼310	▲163
- Map showing results of English and Northern Irish local elections, 2014. Council control in England and in Northern Ireland the largest parties are shown (where all councils had no overall control). Black represents No Overall Control, white represents areas that did not hold an election, blue represents the Conservative Party, red represents the Labour Party and gold represents the Liberal Democrats. Areas in light red represent the Democratic Unionist Party. Dark green represents Sinn Féin and light green represents the SDLP. Areas shown in grey are outside England and Northern Ireland

The 2014 United Kingdom local elections were held on 22 May 2014. Usually these elections are held on the first Thursday in May but were postponed to coincide with the 2014 European Parliament Elections. Direct elections were held for all 32 London boroughs, all 36 metropolitan boroughs, 74 district/borough councils, 19 unitary authorities and various mayoral posts in England and elections to the new councils in Northern Ireland.

All registered electors (British, Irish, Commonwealth and European Union citizens) who were aged 18 or over on the day of the election were entitled to vote in the local elections.

The BBC's projected national vote share (PNV) put Labour on 31%, the Conservatives on 29%, UKIP on 17%, and the Liberal Democrats on 13%. Rallings and Thrasher of Plymouth University's national equivalent vote share (NEV) estimated 31% for Labour, 30% for the Conservatives, 18% for UKIP, and 11% for the Liberal Democrats.

For the fourth year running, the Labour Party enjoyed the largest share of the vote in local elections, but its share of the vote was its smallest since 2010. UKIP, which topped the same day's European Parliament elections, finished third in vote share, claiming council seats from Labour, the Conservatives and Liberal Democrats.

== Overview of results ==
=== UK-wide results ===
Party	Councillors		Councils	
Party	Number	Change	Number	Change
Labour	2,121	▲324	82	▲5
Conservative	1,364	▼236	41	▼11
Liberal Democrats	427	▼310	6	▼2
UKIP	166	▲163	0	Steady
DUP	130	▼15	0	Steady
Sinn Féin	105	▼10	0	Steady
UUP	88	▲11	0	Steady
Independent	71	▲18	0	Steady
SDLP	66	▼1	0	Steady
Residents	53	▲14	0	Steady
Green	38	▲18	0	Steady
Alliance	32	▼2	0	Steady
Tower Hamlets First	18	▲18	0	Steady
TUV	13	▲10	0	Steady
Green (NI)	4	▲1	0	Steady
PUP	4	▲1	0	Steady
NI21	1	▲1	0	Steady
Liberal	2	▼2	0	Steady
BNP	1	▼1	0	Steady
Health Concern	1	▼2	0	Steady
No overall control	n/a	n/a	43	▲8

=== England results ===
Party	Councillors		Councils	
Party	Number	Change	Number	Change
Labour	2,121	▲324	82	▲5
Conservative	1,364	▼236	41	▼11
Liberal Democrats	427	▼310	6	▼2
UKIP	163	▲161	0	Steady
Independent	71	▲18	0	Steady
Residents	53	▲14	0	Steady
Green	38	▲18	0	Steady
Tower Hamlets First	18	▲18	0	Steady
Liberal	2	▼2	0	Steady
BNP	1	▼1	0	Steady
Health Concern	1	▼2	0	Steady
No overall control	n/a	n/a	32	▲8

The Respect Party lost both their remaining councillors.

==== English Councils - shift of control ====
This table depicts how the control of local councils shifted in this election.

The data along the diagonal represents no shift in control in that number of councils: for example, Chorley was among the solid colour no change 73 Labour controlled councils. The other cells represent the shifts of control: for example, Harrow was one of five councils of which Labour gained control from No Overall Control. The intensity of the colour in a table cell other than the diagonal reflects the relative number of losses in council control suffered by each party.

after election →	N.O.C.	Labour	Cons.	Lib. Dem.	Old total	losses
↓ before election	N.O.C.	Labour	Cons.	Lib. Dem.	Old total	losses
No Overall Control	19	5	-	-	24	− 5
Labour	4	73	-	-	77	− 4
Conservative	8	4	40	-	52	−12
Liberal Democrats	1	-	1	6	8	− 2
New total	32	82	41	6	161	-
gains	+13	+ 9	+ 1	-	-	-
Net change	+ 8	+ 5	−11	− 2	-	-

Last updated at 11:30:10 on 27 May 2014

=== Northern Ireland results ===
Party	Councillors			% of councillors			First preference votes			% of FP votes		
Party	2011	2014	+/-	2011	2014	+/-	2011	2014	+/-	2011	2014	+/-
DUP	145	130	▼15	31.4%	28.1%	▼3.3%	179,436	144,928	▼	27.2%	23.1%	▼4.1%
Sinn Féin	115	105	▼10	24.9%	22.7%	▼2.2%	163,712	151,137	▼	24.8%	24.1%	▼0.7%
UUP	77	88	▲11	16.7%	19.0%	▲2.3%	100,643	101,385	▲	15.2%	16.1%	▲0.9%
SDLP	67	66	▼1	14.5%	14.2%	▼0.3%	99,325	85,237	▼	15.0%	13.6%	▼1.4%
Alliance	34	32	▼2	7.4%	6.9%	▼0.5%	48,859	41,769	▼	7.4%	6.7%	▼0.7%
TUV	3	13	▲10	0.6%	2.8%	▲2.2%	13,079	28,310	▲	2.0%	4.5%	▲2.5%
PUP	1	4	▲3	0.2%	0.8%	▲0.6%	3,858	12,753	▲	0.6%	2.0%	▲1.4%
Green (NI)	1	4	▲3	0.2%	0.8%	▲0.6%	6,317	5,515	▼	1.0%	0.8%	▼0.2%
UKIP	1	3	▲2	0.2%	0.6%	▲0.4%	2,550	9,311	▲	0.4%	1.4%	▲1.0%
NI21	0	1	▲1	0.0%	0.2%	▲0.2%	0	11,495	▲	0.0%	1.8%	▲1.8%
People Before Profit	0	1	▲1	0.0%	0.2%	▲0.2%	1,721	1,923	▲	0.3%	0.3%	▲0.0%
NI Conservatives	0	0	Steady	0.0%	0.0%	Steady	1,321	2,527	▲	0.2%	0.4%	▲0.2%
éirígí	0	0	Steady	0.0%	0.0%	Steady	2,062	1,756	▼	0.3%	0.3%	▼0.0%
Workers' Party	0	0	Steady	0.0%	0.0%	Steady	760	985	▲	0.1	0.2%	▲0.1%
Fermanagh Against Fracking	0	0	Steady	0.0%	0.0%	Steady	0	555	▲	0.0%	0.1%	▲0.1%
Republican Network for Unity	0	0	Steady	0.0%	0.0%	Steady	0	502	▲	0.0%	0.1%	▲0.1%
Community Partnership	0	0	Steady	0.0%	0.0%	Steady	800	388	▼	0.1	0.1%	▼0.0%
Socialist Party	0	0	Steady	0.0%	0.0%	Steady	682	272	▼	0.1%	0.0%	▼0.1%
BNP	0	0	Steady	0.0%	0.0%	Steady	491	174	▼	0.1%	0.0%	▼0.1%
Democracy First	0	0	Steady	0.0%	0.0%	Steady	0	173	▲	0.0%	0.0%	▲0.0%
Others	0	0	Steady	0.0%	0.0%	Steady	2,142	0	▼	0.3%	0.0%	▼0.3%
Independent	18	15	▼3	3.9%	3.2%	▼0.7%	32,151	26,682	▼	4.9%	4.2%	▼0.7%
Total	462	462	Steady	100%	100%	Steady	660,631	627,777	▼	100%	100%	Steady

== London boroughs ==
All seats in the 32 London Borough Councils were up for election.

== Results ==
Party	Votes won	% votes	Change	Seats	% seats	Change	Councils	Change
Labour	944,967	37.6	+5.1	1,060	57.3	+185	20	+3
Conservative	663,847	26.4	−5.3	612	33.1	−105	9	−2
Liberal Democrats	267,769	10.6	−11.8	116	6.3	−130	1	−1
Green	246,805	9.8	+3.2	4	0.2	+2	0	±0
UKIP	239,001	9.5	+8.4	12	0.6	+12	0	±0
Others	152,684	6.1	+0.4	47	2.5	+26	0	±0
No overall control	—N/a						2	−6

=== Individual council results ===
Council	Previous control	Result							
Council	Previous control	Result	Con	Lab	LD	UKIP	Green	Ind	Others
Barking and Dagenham	Labour	Labour		51					
Barnet	Conservative	Conservative	32	27	1				
Bexley	Conservative	Conservative	45	15		3			
Brent	Labour	Labour	6	56	1				
Bromley	Conservative	Conservative	51	7		2			
Camden	Labour	Labour	12	40	1		1		
Croydon	Conservative	Labour	30	40					
Ealing	Labour	Labour	12	53	4				
Enfield	Labour	Labour	22	41					
Greenwich	Labour	Labour	8	43					
Hackney	Labour	Labour	4	50	3				
Hammersmith and Fulham	Conservative	Labour	20	26					
Haringey	Labour	Labour		48	9				
Harrow	No overall control	Labour	26	34	1			2	
Havering	Conservative	No overall control	22	1		7			24
Hillingdon	Conservative	Conservative	42	23					
Hounslow	Labour	Labour	11	49					
Islington	Labour	Labour		47			1		
Kensington and Chelsea	Conservative	Conservative	37	12	1				
Kingston upon Thames	Liberal Democrats	Conservative	28	2	18				
Lambeth	Labour	Labour	3	59			1		
Lewisham	Labour	Labour		53			1		
Merton	No overall control	Labour	20	36	1				3
Newham	Labour	Labour		60					
Redbridge	No overall control	Labour	25	35	3				
Richmond upon Thames	Conservative	Conservative	39		15				
Southwark	Labour	Labour	2	48	13				
Sutton	Liberal Democrats	Liberal Democrats	9		45				
Tower Hamlets	Labour	No overall control	4	20					18
Waltham Forest	Labour	Labour	16	44					
Wandsworth	Conservative	Conservative	41	19					
Westminster	Conservative	Conservative		44	16				
Totals			612	1,052	118	12	4	2	45
Councils whose control changed hands highlighted thus

Harrow's Council was elected in 2010 with a Labour majority but divisions within this majority in 2013 led to a coalition struck between the Conservatives and the Independent Labour Group (formed of eight ex-Labour councillors). Conservatives withdrew their support for Independent Labour on 16 September 2013 leading to a brief Conservative minority administration.

== Metropolitan boroughs ==
One third of the seats in all 36 Metropolitan Boroughs were up for election (showing those elected and each party's total in the new council).

Council	Previous control	Result					
Council	Previous control	Result	Con	Lab	LD	UKIP	Others
Barnsley	Labour	Labour	1, 4	18, 52			2, 7
Birmingham	Labour	Labour	13, 31	22, 77	5, 12		
Bolton	Labour	Labour	5, 15	13, 40	1, 3	2, 2	
Bradford	Labour	Labour	7, 21	17, 46	3, 8	1, 1	1,3Grn; 2,11Ind
Bury	Labour	Labour	2, 11	15, 38	0, 1		0, 1
Calderdale	No overall control	No overall control (Lab minority, then Con-Ind minority)	6, 19	9, 25	1, 6		1, 1
Coventry	Labour	Labour	6, 11	13, 43			
Doncaster	Labour	Labour	3, 8	15, 48		1, 1	2, 6
Dudley	Labour	Labour	7, 20	10, 40		7, 9	0,1Grn; 0,2Ind
Gateshead	Labour	Labour		18, 55	4, 11		
Kirklees	No overall control	No overall control (Lab minority)	6, 18	10, 32	5, 11		1,5Grn; 1,3Ind
Knowsley	Labour	Labour		21, 63			
Leeds	Labour	Labour	6, 19	20, 62	4, 9		1,3Grn; 2,6Ind
Liverpool	Labour	Labour		27, 79	0, 3		2,4Grn; 1,4Ind
Manchester	Labour	Labour		33, 95			1, 1
Newcastle upon Tyne	Labour	Labour		18, 52	8, 24		0, 2
North Tyneside	Labour	Labour	3, 12	15, 44	1, 4		
Oldham	Labour	Labour	0, 2	14, 45	3, 10	2, 2	1, 1
Rochdale	Labour	Labour	3, 11	16, 48	1, 1		
Rotherham	Labour	Labour	0, 2	11, 50		10, 10	0, 1
St Helens	Labour	Labour	1, 3	14, 43	1, 2		
Salford	Labour	Labour	3, 8	17, 52			
Sandwell	Labour	Labour	0, 1	23, 70		1, 1	
Sefton	Labour	Labour	2, 7	13, 40	6, 17		1, 2
Sheffield	Labour	Labour		18, 60	6, 17	3, 3	2,4Grn
Solihull	Conservative	Conservative	9, 29	0, 2	3, 8	1, 1	4,10Grn
South Tyneside	Labour	Labour	0, 1	17, 49		0, 1	1, 3
Stockport	No overall control	No overall control (Lib Dem minority)	4, 10	7, 22	9, 28		1, 3
Sunderland	Labour	Labour	3, 8	21, 63			1, 4
Tameside	Labour	Labour	2, 6	17, 51			
Trafford	Conservative	Conservative	12, 33	9, 27	1, 3		
Wakefield	Labour	Labour	1, 6	17, 54		2, 2	1, 1
Walsall	No overall control	No overall control (Lab minority)	6, 21	9, 30	0, 3	3, 3	1, 3
Wigan	Labour	Labour	1, 2	23, 62			1, 11
Wirral	Labour	Labour	8, 22	11, 37	2, 6		1,1Grn
Wolverhampton	Labour	Labour	4, 12	15, 45	0, 2	1, 1	
Totals			117, 373	563, 1,741	62, 189	33, 37	28, 104

== Unitary authorities ==
Two unitary authorities had all of their seats up for election following boundary changes.

Council	Previous control	Result				
Council	Previous control	Result	Con	Lab	LD	UKIP
Milton Keynes	No overall control	No overall control (Lab minority)	18	25	13	1
Slough	Labour	Labour	8	33		1

One third of the council seats were up for election in 17 unitary authorities (elected and totals shown).

Council	Previous control	Result						
Council	Previous control	Result	Con	Lab	LD	UKIP	Ind	Others
Blackburn with Darwen		Labour won the most seats	4	16	1			
Blackburn with Darwen	Labour	Labour	12	48	4			
Bristol			6	10	6	1	-	3 Green
Bristol	No overall control	No overall control	15	31	16	1	1	6 Green
Derby			6	8	3	1	-	
Derby	Labour	Labour	14	27	7	2	1	
Halton		Labour won the most seats		16	1			
Halton	Labour	Labour	2	51	3			
Hartlepool		Labour won the most seats	1	6		2	2	
Hartlepool	Labour	Labour	3	19		2	9	
Kingston upon Hull		Labour won the most seats	1	12	7	-	-	
Kingston upon Hull	Labour	Labour	2	37	15	1	4	
North East Lincolnshire			3	3	2	7		
North East Lincolnshire	Labour	No overall control (Labour minority)	10	21	3	8		
Peterborough			10	2	3	3	2	
Peterborough	Conservative	No overall control (Conservative minority)	28	12	4	3	10	
Plymouth			9	7		3		
Plymouth	Labour	Labour	24	30		3		
Portsmouth			5	-	3	6	-	
Portsmouth	Liberal Democrats	No overall control (Con with UKIP & Lab support)	12	4	19	6	1	
Reading		Labour won the most seats	2	11	1			2 Green
Reading	Labour	Labour	10	31	2			3 Green
Southampton			8	8			1	
Southampton	Labour	Labour	18	28			2	
Southend-on-Sea			4	4	1	5	4	-
Southend-on-Sea	Conservative	No overall control (Ind/Lab/LD coalition)	19	9	5	5	10	
Swindon		Conservatives won most seats	11	8	1			
Swindon	Conservative	Conservative	30	23	4			
Thurrock			5	6		5	-	
Thurrock	Labour	No overall control (Labour minority)	18	23		6	2	
Warrington		Labour won the most seats	1	15	5			
Warrington	Labour	Labour	3	43	11			
Wokingham		Conservatives won most seats	15	1	2		-	
Wokingham	Conservative	Conservative	44	1	7		2	
Totals		seats won in May 2014	91	133	36	33	9	5 Green
Totals	Total membership of new councils		264	438	100	37	42	9 Green
source: BBC News, retrieved June 2014			Cons	Lab	LD	UKIP	Ind	others

== Non-metropolitan districts ==
=== Whole council ===
- Two district councils had all of their seats up for election following boundary changes

Council	Previous control	Result				
Council	Previous control	Result	Con	Lab	LD	Others
Hart	No overall control	No overall control	14		9	10
Three Rivers	Liberal Democrats	Liberal Democrats	10	3	23	

=== Half of council ===
- Seven district councils had half of their seats up for election (showing those elected and the new council)

Council	Previous control	Result					
Council	Previous control	Result	Con	Lab	LD	UKIP	Others
Adur	Conservative	Conservative	9, 20	0, 1		4, 6	1, 2
Cheltenham	Liberal Democrats	Liberal Democrats	4, 11		13, 24		2, 5
Fareham	Conservative	Conservative	11, 23		3, 5	1, 1	1, 2
Gosport	Conservative	Conservative	12, 21	2, 6	2, 6	0, 1	
Hastings	Labour	Labour	5, 8	11, 24			
Nuneaton and Bedworth	Labour	Labour	2, 3	14, 28			1,2Grn; 0,1Ind
Oxford	Labour	Labour		17, 33	5, 8		3,6Grn; 0,1Ind
Totals			43, 86	44, 92	23, 43	5, 8	7, 19

=== Third of council ===
- 65 district councils had one third of their seats up for election

Council	Previous control	Result					
Council	Previous control	Result	Con	Lab	LD	UKIP	Others
Amber Valley	Conservative	Labour	4, 21	11, 23			0, 1
Basildon	Conservative	No overall control Con minority	4, 17	0, 10	0, 1	11, 12	0, 2
Basingstoke and Deane	No overall control	No overall control Con minority	8, 28	8, 17	3, 9	1, 2	2, 4
Bassetlaw	Labour	Labour	3, 11	12, 34			1, 3
Brentwood	Conservative	No overall control LibDem/Ind/Lab coalition	6, 18	1, 3	5, 11		0, 5
Broxbourne	Conservative	Conservative	9, 26	1, 3		1, 1	
Burnley	Labour	Labour	1, 5	10, 28	4, 12		
Cambridge	No overall control	Labour	0, 1	10, 25	4, 14		1, 2
Cannock Chase	Labour	Labour	1, 6	6, 25	1, 2	4, 6	1, 2
Carlisle	Labour	Labour	7, 19	9, 29	0, 2		1, 2
Castle Point	Conservative	No overall control Con minority	20, 20			5, 5	0, 16
Cherwell	Conservative	Conservative	12, 40	4, 7	1, 2		0, 1
Chorley	Labour	Labour	3, 13	13, 32			1, 2
Colchester	No overall control	No overall control LibDem/Lab/Ind coalition	8, 23	2, 8	9, 25		1, 4
Craven	Conservative	Conservative	7, 18		0, 2		2, 10
Crawley	Conservative	Labour	5, 16	8, 20		0, 1	
Daventry	Conservative	Conservative	10, 28	0, 4	0, 1	2, 3	
Eastleigh	Liberal Democrats	Liberal Democrats	2, 4		13, 40		
Elmbridge	Conservative	Conservative	12, 33		2, 6		4, 21
Epping Forest	Conservative	Conservative	0, 37	0, 1	2, 3	0, 2	0,1Grn; 5,14Ind
Exeter	Labour	Labour	2, 10	10, 27	1, 3		
Gloucester	No overall control	No overall control Con minority	8, 18	3, 9	4, 9		
Great Yarmouth	Labour	No overall control Lab minority	2, 14	1, 15		10, 10	
Harlow	Labour	Labour	3, 11	4, 17		5, 5	
Harrogate	Conservative	Conservative	9, 34		8, 15		2, 5
Havant	Conservative	Conservative	10, 31	1, 4	1, 1	2, 2	
Hertsmere	Conservative	Conservative	11, 34	2, 5			
Huntingdonshire	Conservative	Conservative	11, 34	0, 1	1, 6	3, 7	0,4Grn; 2,3Ind
Hyndburn	Labour	Labour	2, 8	7, 23	0, 2	2, 2	
Ipswich	Labour	Labour	4, 10	12, 35	1, 3		
Lincoln	Labour	Labour	2, 6	9, 27			
Maidstone	Conservative	No overall control Con minority	5, 25	1, 2	9, 19	4, 4	1, 5
Mole Valley	No overall control	No overall control	6, 19		4, 15	1, 1	3, 6
Newcastle-under-Lyme	Labour	Labour	5, 16	11, 32	5, 6	0,5	0,1Grn
North Hertfordshire	Conservative	Conservative	12, 33	5, 12	0, 3		0, 1
Norwich	Labour	Labour		8, 21	1, 3		5,15Grn
Pendle	No overall control	No overall control	5, 19	7, 18	3, 11		1, 1
Preston	Labour	Labour	6, 19	7, 32	2, 5		0, 1
Purbeck †	No overall control	No overall control Con minority	6, 12		2, 11		0, 1
Redditch	Labour	Labour	3, 9	6, 17		2, 2	0, 1
Reigate and Banstead	Conservative	Conservative	12, 37		1, 2	1, 1	1,3Grn; 2,8Ind
Rochford	Conservative	Conservative	6, 26	1, 1	1, 3	3, 3	1,2Grn; 1,4Ind
Rossendale	Labour	Labour	5, 10	6, 24			1, 2
Rugby	Conservative	Conservative	7, 23	3, 10	3, 7		2, 2
Runnymede	Conservative	Conservative	12, 35			0, 1	2, 6
Rushmoor	Conservative	Conservative	8, 24	4, 12		1, 3	
St Albans	No overall control	No overall control Con minority	12, 29	3, 10	7, 17		0,1Grn; 0,1Ind
South Cambridgeshire	Conservative	Conservative	10, 35	0, 1	7, 13		2, 8
South Lakeland	Liberal Democrats	Liberal Democrats	2, 15	0, 3	15, 33		
Stevenage	Labour	Labour	2, 2	34, 34	3, 3		
Stratford-on-Avon	Conservative	Conservative	15, 35	0, 1	3, 12		0, 5
Stroud	No overall control	No overall control Lab/Green/LibDem coalition	10, 22	6, 20	0, 2		2,6Grn; 0,1Ind
Tamworth	Conservative	Conservative	6, 16	3, 12		1, 1	0, 1
Tandridge	Conservative	Conservative	13, 34		1, 6		0, 2
Tunbridge Wells	Conservative	Conservative	14, 38	1, 3	1, 3	0, 2	0, 2
Watford	Liberal Democrats	Liberal Democrats	1, 1	4, 11	7, 23		1,1Grn
Welwyn Hatfield	Conservative	Conservative	13, 31	4, 14	1, 2		0, 1
West Lancashire	Conservative	No overall control Con minority	11, 27	8, 27			
West Oxfordshire	Conservative	Conservative	15, 40	1, 5	1, 3		0, 1
Weymouth and Portland	No overall control	No overall control Lab/LibDem coalition	4, 11	5, 15	1, 6	1, 1	1, 1
Winchester	No overall control	No overall control Con minority	11, 28	1, 3	7, 25		0, 1
Woking	Conservative	Conservative	7, 23	1, 1	3, 11		1, 1
Worcester	No overall control	No overall control Con minority	6, 17	6, 16	0, 1		0,1Grn
Worthing	Conservative	Conservative	9, 27		1, 7	1, 1	1,1Grn; 0,1Ind
Wyre Forest	No overall control	No overall control	5, 15	2, 9		5, 5	1, 13
Totals			446, 1,348	283, 796	163, 421	66, 88	47, 211

† Elected councillors will hold office for one year only as Purbeck District will adopt whole council elections from 2015.

== Mayoral elections ==
There were five mayoral elections.

Local Authority	Previous Mayor	New Mayor
Hackney	Jules Pipe (Labour)	Jules Pipe (Labour)
Lewisham	Sir Steve Bullock (Labour)	Sir Steve Bullock (Labour)
Newham	Robin Wales (Labour)	Robin Wales (Labour)
Tower Hamlets	Lutfur Rahman (Independent)	Lutfur Rahman (Tower Hamlets First)
Watford	Dorothy Thornhill (Liberal Democrat)	Dorothy Thornhill (Liberal Democrat)

In Copeland, there was a referendum to establish a post of directly elected mayor, which passed.

== Northern Ireland ==
These were the first elections to the 11 new 'super-councils' in Northern Ireland, following a reorganisation. These will operate in shadow form for one year, with the current 26 councils existing in parallel.

Sinn Féin (dark green) won more seats than any other party in (1) Belfast, (9) Mid-Ulster, (10) Derry & Strabane and (11) Fermanagh & Omagh. Sinn Féin and the SDLP elected more councillors (14 each) than did any other party in (5) Newry, Mourne & Down . The Democratic Unionist Party (dark orange) won more seats than any other party in each of the other six councils, and won as many as all the other parties combined in (4) Lisburn & Castlereagh.

The eleven new districts

Leading party in each new council

=== Party composition of new councils ===
The party abbreviations in this table are explained in the total-vote table that follows it.

Seats won
	Council	Total seats	SF	SDLP	Alliance	UUP	DUP	TUV	Ind	Others
3	Antrim and Newtownabbey	40	3	4	4	12	15	2		
6	Armagh, Banbridge & Craigavon	41	8	6		12	13		1	1 UKIP
1	Belfast City	60	19	7	8	7	13	1		5 *
8	Causeway Coast and Glens	40	7	6	1	10	11	3	1	1 PUP
10	Derry and Strabane	40	16	10		2	8		4	
11	Fermanagh and Omagh	40	17	8		9	5		1	
4	Lisburn and Castlereagh	40		3	7	8	20	1		1 NI21
7	Mid and East Antrim	40	3	1	3	9	16	5	2	1 UKIP
9	Mid-Ulster	40	18	6		7	8		1	
5	Newry, Mourne and Down	41	14	14	2	3	4		3	1 UKIP
2	North Down and Ards	40		1	7	9	17	1	2	3 Green^{(NI)}
Total		462	105	66	32	88	130	13	15	13
1	* Belfast other: 3 Progressive Unionist, 1 Green Party Northern Ireland & 1 People Before Profit									

=== Votes cast ===
These elections used the Single Transferable Vote method of proportional representation. Votes and percentages for each party reflect the first preference on each ballot.

Party	Councillors			% of councillors			First preference votes			% of FP votes		
Party	2011 (notional)	2014	+/-	2011 (notional)	2014	+/-	2011	2014	+/-	2011	2014	+/-
DUP	145	130	▼15	31.4%	28.1%	▼3.3%	179,436	144,928	▼	27.2%	23.1%	▼4.1%
Sinn Féin	115	105	▼10	24.9%	22.7%	▼2.2%	163,712	151,137	▼	24.8%	24.1%	▼0.7%
UUP	77	88	▲11	16.7%	19.0%	▲2.3%	100,643	101,385	▲	15.2%	16.1%	▲0.9%
SDLP	67	66	▼1	14.5%	14.2%	▼0.3%	99,325	85,237	▼	15.0%	13.6%	▼1.4%
Alliance	34	32	▼2	7.4%	6.9%	▼0.5%	48,859	41,769	▼	7.4%	6.7%	▼0.7%
TUV	3	13	▲10	0.6%	2.8%	▲2.2%	13,079	28,310	▲	2.0%	4.5%	▲2.5%
PUP	1	4	▲3	0.2%	0.8%	▲0.6%	3,858	12,753	▲	0.6%	2.0%	▲1.4%
Green (NI)	1	4	▲3	0.2%	0.8%	▲0.6%	6,317	5,515	▼	1.0%	0.8%	▼0.2%
UKIP	1	3	▲2	0.2%	0.6%	▲0.4%	2,550	9,311	▲	0.4%	1.4%	▲1.0%
NI21	0	1	▲1	0.0%	0.2%	▲0.2%	0	11,495	▲	0.0%	1.8%	▲1.8%
People Before Profit	0	1	▲1	0.0%	0.2%	▲0.2%	1,721	1,923	▲	0.3%	0.3%	▲0.0%
NI Conservatives	0	0	Steady	0.0%	0.0%	Steady	1,321	2,527	▲	0.2%	0.4%	▲0.2%
éirígí	0	0	Steady	0.0%	0.0%	Steady	2,062	1,756	▼	0.3%	0.3%	▼0.0%
Workers' Party	0	0	Steady	0.0%	0.0%	Steady	760	985	▲	0.1	0.2%	▲0.1%
Fermanagh Against Fracking	0	0	Steady	0.0%	0.0%	Steady	0	555	▲	0.0%	0.1%	▲0.1%
Republican Network for Unity	0	0	Steady	0.0%	0.0%	Steady	0	502	▲	0.0%	0.1%	▲0.1%
Community Partnership	0	0	Steady	0.0%	0.0%	Steady	800	388	▼	0.1	0.1%	▼0.0%
Socialist Party	0	0	Steady	0.0%	0.0%	Steady	682	272	▼	0.1%	0.0%	▼0.1%
BNP	0	0	Steady	0.0%	0.0%	Steady	491	174	▼	0.1%	0.0%	▼0.1%
Democracy First	0	0	Steady	0.0%	0.0%	Steady	0	173	▲	0.0%	0.0%	▲0.0%
Others	0	0	Steady	0.0%	0.0%	Steady	2,142	0	▼	0.3%	0.0%	▼0.3%
Independent	18	15	▼3	3.9%	3.2%	▼0.7%	32,151	26,682	▼	4.9%	4.2%	▼0.7%
Total	462	462	Steady	100%	100%	Steady	660,631	627,777	▼	100%	100%	Steady

== Electoral administration ==
=== Eligibility to vote ===
All registered electors (British, Irish, Commonwealth and European Union citizens) who were aged 18 or over on the day of the election were entitled to vote in the local elections. Those who were temporarily away from their ordinary address (for example, away working, on holiday, in student accommodation or in hospital) were also entitled to vote in the local elections, although those who have moved abroad and registered as overseas electors cannot vote in the local elections. Those who were registered to vote at more than one address (such as a university student who has a term-time address and lives at home during holidays) were entitled to vote in the local elections at each address, as long as they were not in the same local government area.

== Enacting legislation ==
These elections were held on 22 May 2014 as provided by 'The Local Elections (Ordinary Day of Elections in 2014) Order 2013' (S.I. 2013/2277).

== See also ==
- Political make-up of local councils in the United Kingdom
