= 2014 Great Yarmouth Borough Council election =

2014 UK local government election

Results of the 2014 Great Yarmouth Borough Council election

The 2014 Great Yarmouth Borough Council election took place on 22 May 2014 to elect members of Great Yarmouth Borough Council in England. This was on the same day as other local elections.

== Ward results ==
=== Bradwell North ===
Bradwell North
| Party | Candidate | Votes | % | ±% |
|---|---|---|---|---|
| Conservative | Graham Plant | 749 | 38.8 | +3.2 |
| UKIP | Lynne Connell | 689 | 35.7 | +13.3 |
| Labour | Christina Horne | 494 | 25.6 | −16.3 |
| Majority | | | | |
| Turnout | | | | |
| Conservative hold | | Swing | | |

=== Bradwell South and Hopton ===
Bradwell South and Hopton
| Party | Candidate | Votes | % | ±% |
|---|---|---|---|---|
| UKIP | Carl Annison | 948 | 49.1 | +29.4 |
| Conservative | Demetris Mavroudis | 543 | 28.1 | −5.9 |
| Labour | Peter Fairhead | 441 | 22.8 | −17.7 |
| Majority | | | | |
| Turnout | | | | |
| UKIP gain from Conservative | | Swing | | |

=== Caister North ===
Caister North
| Party | Candidate | Votes | % | ±% |
|---|---|---|---|---|
| UKIP | John Cutting | 577 | 38.0 | +38.0 |
| Conservative | Ronald Hanton | 509 | 33.5 | −20.8 |
| Labour | Christopher Wright | 357 | 23.5 | −14.0 |
| Green | Sarah Bloomfield | 77 | 5.1 | +5.1 |
| Majority | | | | |
| Turnout | | | | |
| UKIP gain from Conservative | | Swing | | |

=== Caister South ===
Caister South
| Party | Candidate | Votes | % | ±% |
|---|---|---|---|---|
| UKIP | Thomas Andrews | 615 | 40.2 | +40.2 |
| Conservative | Carl Smith | 404 | 26.4 | −28.6 |
| Labour | Sandra Griffiths | 396 | 25.9 | −19.1 |
| Green | Harry Webb | 114 | 7.5 | +7.5 |
| Majority | | | | |
| Turnout | | | | |
| UKIP gain from Conservative | | Swing | | |

=== Central and Northgate ===
Central and Northgate
| Party | Candidate | Votes | % | ±% |
|---|---|---|---|---|
| UKIP | Malcolm Bird | 858 | 46.3 | +25.3 |
| Labour | Brian Pilkington | 588 | 31.7 | −22.1 |
| Conservative | Patricia Page | 303 | 16.4 | −6.2 |
| Green | Amanda Webb | 104 | 5.6 | +5.6 |
| Majority | | | | |
| Turnout | | | | |
| UKIP gain from Labour | | Swing | | |

=== Claydon ===
Claydon
| Party | Candidate | Votes | % | ±% |
|---|---|---|---|---|
| UKIP | Tabitha Rodwell | 767 | 43.1 | +22.3 |
| Labour | Colleen Walker | 687 | 38.6 | −18.1 |
| Conservative | Margaret Greenacre | 327 | 18.4 | −4.1 |
| Majority | | | | |
| Turnout | | | | |
| UKIP gain from Labour | | Swing | | |

=== East Flegg ===
East Flegg
| Party | Candidate | Votes | % | ±% |
|---|---|---|---|---|
| Conservative | Shirley Weymouth | 728 | 41.8 | −0.2 |
| UKIP | Clayton Greene | 682 | 39.2 | +14.3 |
| Labour | Stacey Nash | 228 | 13.1 | −15.4 |
| Green | John Mallett | 102 | 5.9 | +5.9 |
| Majority | | | | |
| Turnout | | | | |
| Conservative hold | | Swing | | |

=== Gorleston ===
Gorleston
| Party | Candidate | Votes | % | ±% |
|---|---|---|---|---|
| UKIP | Kay Grey | 587 | 35.5 | +1.5 |
| Conservative | John Burroughs | 563 | 34.1 | −3.6 |
| Labour | Anthony Wright | 420 | 25.4 | −2.9 |
| Green | Patricia Bradwell | 83 | 5.0 | +5.0 |
| Majority | | | | |
| Turnout | | | | |
| UKIP gain from Conservative | | Swing | | |

=== Lothingland ===
Lothingland
| Party | Candidate | Votes | % | ±% |
|---|---|---|---|---|
| UKIP | Adrian Myers | 674 | 42.0 | +42.0 |
| Conservative | Barry Stone | 616 | 38.4 | −24.7 |
| Labour | Christine Williamson | 314 | 19.6 | −17.3 |
| Majority | | | | |
| Turnout | | | | |
| UKIP gain from Conservative | | Swing | | |

=== Magdalen ===
Magdalen
| Party | Candidate | Votes | % | ±% |
|---|---|---|---|---|
| Labour | Trevor Wainwright | 844 | 45.2 | −10.8 |
| UKIP | Danny Chambers | 667 | 35.7 | +16.4 |
| Conservative | Brain Dolton | 355 | 19.0 | −5.7 |
| Majority | | | | |
| Turnout | | | | |
| Labour hold | | Swing | | |

=== Nelson ===
Nelson
| Party | Candidate | Votes | % | ±% |
|---|---|---|---|---|
| UKIP | Kathryn Stenhouse | 694 | 42.2 | +20.1 |
| Labour | Valerie Pettit | 651 | 39.6 | −20.1 |
| Conservative | Thomas Allan | 202 | 12.3 | −5.9 |
| Green | Diana Freshwater | 96 | 5.8 | +5.8 |
| Majority | | | | |
| Turnout | | | | |
| UKIP gain from Labour | | Swing | | |

=== Southtown and Cobholm ===
Southtown and Cobholm
| Party | Candidate | Votes | % | ±% |
|---|---|---|---|---|
| UKIP | Robert Connell | 526 | 46.5 | +20.6 |
| Labour | Christina Stewart | 476 | 42.0 | −14.5 |
| Conservative | Victoria Snedker | 130 | 11.5 | −1.0 |
| Majority | | | | |
| Turnout | | | | |
| UKIP gain from Labour | | Swing | | |

=== Yarmouth North ===
Yarmouth North
| Party | Candidate | Votes | % | ±% |
|---|---|---|---|---|
| UKIP | Rachel Jones | 589 | 39.6 | +20.9 |
| Conservative | Penelope Carpenter | 429 | 28.8 | −5.2 |
| Labour | Paula Waters-Bunn | 412 | 27.7 | −12.1 |
| Green | Joshua White | 58 | 3.9 | +0.2 |
| Majority | | | | |
| Turnout | | | | |
| UKIP gain from Labour | | Swing | | |
