= 2014 West Lancashire Borough Council election =

2014 UK local government election

Results of the 2014 West Lancashire Borough Council election

The 2014 West Lancashire Borough Council election took place on 22 May 2014 to elect members of West Lancashire Borough Council in Lancashire, England, as part of the wider 2014 United Kingdom local elections and with the United Kingdom component of the 2014 European Parliament election on the same day. One third of the council is up for election.

== Results summary ==
The council became No Overall Control.

West Lancashire local election result 2014
Party	Seats	Gains	Losses	Net gain/loss	Seats %	Votes %	Votes	+/−
Conservative	27	0	1	-1	50.0	39.5	10,457	
Labour	27	1	0	+1	50.0	42.0	11,110	
Liberal Democrats	0	0	0	0	0.0	0.3	66	
UKIP	0	0	0	0	0.0	12.9	3,243	
Green	0	0	0	0	0.0	3.2	855	
Independent	0	0	0	0	0.0	2.1	567	

Voters-70,195 Turnout-26,478 Percentage-37.72%

=== By ward ===
==== Ashurst ====
Ashurst
Party	Candidate	Votes	%	±%
Labour	Yvonne Gagen	945	63.5	
UKIP	Johnathan Celis	400	26.9	
Conservative	Amanda Kay	143	9.6	
Majority		545	36.6	
Turnout		1,488	31.0	
Labour hold		Swing		

==== Aughton and Downholland ====
Aughton and Downholland
Party	Candidate	Votes	%	±%
Conservative	David O'Toole	761	42.7	
Labour	Paul Hennessy	557	31.3	
UKIP	Jim Bevan	464	26.0	
Majority		204		
Turnout		1.782	38.3	
Conservative hold		Swing		

==== Aughton Park ====
Aughton Park
Party	Candidate	Votes	%	±%
Conservative	Sue Bailey	478	40.1	
Labour	Charles Gains	350	29.3	
UKIP	Tony Green	365	30.6	
Majority		113		
Turnout		1193	37.1%	

==== Burscough East ====
Burscough East
Party	Candidate	Votes	%	±%
Conservative	Ruth Melling	645	45.8%	
Labour	Jennifer Patterson	502	35.7%	
UKIP	John Stewart	261	18.5%	
Majority		143		
Turnout		1408	42.2%	

==== Burscough West ====
Burscough West
Party	Candidate	Votes	%	±%
Conservative	Jason Grice	445	28.2%	
Labour	John Davis	794	50.4%	
UKIP	Chris McIntosh	337	21.4%	
Majority		349		
Turnout		1576	40.2%	

==== Derby ====
Derby
Party	Candidate	Votes	%	±%
Labour	Paul Cotterill	585	35.2%	
Green	Heather Doyle	245	14.7%	
Conservative	Paul Greenall	832	50.1%	
Majority		247		
Turnout		1662	28.5%	

==== Hesketh with Becconsall ====
Hesketh with Becconsall
Party	Candidate	Votes	%	±%
Labour	Sally Hodson	358	32.5%	
Conservative	Iain Ashcroft	743	67.5%	
Majority		385		
Turnout		1101	34.4%	

==== Knowsley ====
Knowsley
Party	Candidate	Votes	%	±%
Labour	Gareth Dowling	913	45.2%	
Conservative	Edward McCarthy	885	43.8%	
Green	John Watt	224	11.1%	
Majority		28		
Turnout		2022	44.2%	

==== Moorside ====
Moorside
Party	Candidate	Votes	%	±%
Labour	Terence Devine	715	90.5%	
Conservative	Amanda Shaw	75	9.5%	
Majority		640		
Turnout		790	28.4%	

==== Newburgh ====
Newburgh
Party	Candidate	Votes	%	±%
Conservative	Eddie Pope	411	59.7%	
Labour	Jacky Citarella	163	23.7%	
UKIP	Ken Tyms	114	16.6%	
Majority		248		
Turnout		688	41.8%	

==== North Meols ====
North Meols
Party	Candidate	Votes	%	±%
Labour	Joan Draper	277	25.6%	
Conservative	Malcolm Barron	439	40.6%	
UKIP	Stuart Wilson	364	33.7%	
Majority		75		
Turnout		1080	32.9%	

==== Parbold ====
Parbold
Party	Candidate	Votes	%	±%
UKIP	Joseph Farley	156	12.1%	
Conservative	David Whittington	696	53.9%	
Labour	Clare Gillard	376	29.1%	
Green	Julie Hotchkiss	64	5.0%	
Majority		320		
Turnout		1292	41.5%	

==== Scarisbrick ====
Scarisbrick
Party	Candidate	Votes	%	±%
Labour	Allison Sinton	385	33.7%	
Conservative	Jane Marshall	758	66.3%	
Majority		373		
Turnout		1143	37.4%	

==== Scott ====
Scott
Party	Candidate	Votes	%	±%
Conservative	David Meadows	551	31.7%	
Liberal Democrats	Peter Banks	66	3.8%	
Labour	Noel Delaney	894	51.4%	
Green	Maurice George	227	13.1%	
Majority		343		
Turnout		1738	37.5%	

==== Skelmersdale South ====
Skelmersdale South
Party	Candidate	Votes	%	±%
Labour	David McKay	995	62.3%	
UKIP	Mike Brennan	388	24.3%	
Conservative	James Trafford	119	7.5%	
Green	Martin Lowe	95	5.9%	
Majority		607		
Turnout		1597	32.1%	

==== Tanhouse ====
Tanhouse
Party	Candidate	Votes	%	±%
Labour	Bob Pendleton	759	79.6%	
Conservative	Bill Weingart	74	7.8%	
UKIP	Damon Noone	121	12.7%	
Majority		638		
Turnout		954	26.3%	

==== Tarleton (2 Seats) ====
Tarleton
Party	Candidate	Votes	%	±%
Conservative	John Mee	1054	33.7	
Conservative	James Kay	936	29.9%	
Independent	Jim Doran	567	18.1%	
Labour	Julie Higson	340	10.9%	
Labour	Matthew Waller	234	7.5%	
Majority		487		
Turnout		3131	68.8%	

==== Up Holland ====
Up Holland
Party	Candidate	Votes	%	±%
Conservative	David Gallagher	412	22.5%	
UKIP	Colin Wilkinson	453	24.7%	
Labour	Ian Moran	968	52.8%	
Majority		515		
Turnout		1833	36.5%	
