= 2014 Rugby Borough Council election =

2014 UK local government election

Map of the results

Elections to Rugby Borough Council were held on Thursday 22 May 2014.

14 seats were contested in this election, the first since the whole council was elected in 2012 following a boundary review. The Conservative Party retained their majority at that election. In multi-member seats, the councillor elected with the fewest votes in 2012 was up for re-election.

== Election results ==
Rugby Borough Council Election, 2014
Party	Seats	Gains	Losses	Net gain/loss	Seats %	Votes %	Votes	+/−
Conservative								
Labour								
Liberal Democrats								
UKIP								
Green								
TUSC								
Independent								

== Ward results ==
Admirals & Cawston Ward
Party	Candidate	Votes	%	±%
UKIP	Gordon Davies			
Liberal Democrats	Gwen Hotten			
Labour	Hamish Bartholomew Livingstone			
Green	Peter Stephen Reynolds			
Conservative	Mark Anthony Williams			
Majority				
Turnout				
		Swing		

Benn Ward
Party	Candidate	Votes	%	±%
Conservative	Lorna Lyttle			
Liberal Democrats	Claire Louise Sandison			
Labour	James Masih Shera			
TUSC	Bill Smith			
Green	Steven Michael Wright			
Majority				
Turnout				
		Swing		

Bilton Ward
Party	Candidate	Votes	%	±%
Labour	Michael Avis			
Conservative	Chris Cade			
Green	Kate Crowley			
Liberal Democrats	Lesley Mary George			
TUSC	Stephen James Roberts			
Majority				
Turnout				
		Swing		

Coton and Boughton Ward
Party	Candidate	Votes	%	±%
UKIP	Fiona Barrington-Ward			
Green	Zoe Reeves			
Conservative	Jill Beverley Simpson-Vince			
Labour	John Anthony Slinger			
Majority				
Turnout				
		Swing		

Dunsmore Ward
Party	Candidate	Votes	%	±%
Labour	Kieren Richard George Brown			
Independent	Deepah Roberts			
Conservative	Ian Spiers			
Green	David Wolfskehl			
Majority				
Turnout				
		Swing		

Eastlands Ward
Party	Candidate	Votes	%	±%
Conservative	David Dick Cranham			
Green	Phil Godden			
TUSC	Rob Johnson			
Liberal Democrats	Dale Keeling			
Labour	Steve Weston			
Majority				
Turnout				
		Swing		

Hillmorton Ward
Party	Candidate	Votes	%	±%
Conservative	Nigel David Allen			
Labour	Barbara Anne Brown			
Liberal Democrats	Tim Douglas			
Green	Tim McKenzie			
Majority				
Turnout				
		Swing		

New Bilton Ward
Party	Candidate	Votes	%	±%
Labour	Steve Birkett			
Conservative	Charlie Hull			
Green	Roy Leonard Sandison			
Majority				
Turnout				
		Swing		

Newbold and Brownsover Ward
Party	Candidate	Votes	%	±%
Green	Lorna Beryl Joyce Dunleavy			
Liberal Democrats	Chris Holman			
Conservative	Ian Stanley Lowe			
Labour	Ram Srivastava			
Majority				
Turnout				
		Swing		

Paddox Ward
Party	Candidate	Votes	%	±%
Conservative	Greg Lyttle			
Green	Amber Merrick-Potter			
Liberal Democrats	Noreen Coral New			
Labour	Owen Keir Richards			
Majority				
Turnout				
		Swing		

Revel and Binley Woods Ward
Party	Candidate	Votes	%	±%
UKIP	John Edward Birch			
Labour	Doreen Cox			
Conservative	Belinda Garcia			
Green	Roger Hill			
Majority				
Turnout				
		Swing		

Rokeby and Overslade Ward
Party	Candidate	Votes	%	±%
Conservative	Julie Beverly A'Barrow			
Green	Laurence Goodchild			
Liberal Democrats	Bill Lewis			
Labour	Bill Scott			
TUSC	Julie Dawn Weekes			
Majority				
Turnout				
		Swing		

Wolston and the Lawfords Ward
Party	Candidate	Votes	%	±%
Conservative	David John Ellis			
TUSC	Pete McLaren			
Labour	Emma Nuttall			
Green	Ellie Roderick			
UKIP	Pat Wyatt			
Majority				
Turnout				
		Swing		

Wolvey and Shilton Ward
Party	Candidate	Votes	%	±%
Labour	Rob Bevin			
Conservative	Chris Pacey-Day			
Green	Louisa Taylor			
Majority				
Turnout				
		Swing		
