= 2014 Stratford-on-Avon District Council election =

2014 UK local government election

Results of the 2014 Stratford-on-Avon District Council election

The 2014 Stratford-on-Avon District Council election took place on 22 May 2014 to elect members of Stratford-on-Avon District Council in England. This was on the same day as other local elections.
