= 2014 Slough Borough Council election =

2014 UK local government election

Results of the 2014 Slough Borough Council election

The 2014 Slough Borough Council election took place on 22 May 2014 to elect members of Slough Borough Council in England. This was on the same day as other local elections.

The whole council (42 seats) was up for election due to a re-drawing of boundaries and an increase from 41 councillors.

After the election, the composition of the council was:

- Labour 33
- Conservative 8
- UKIP 1
