= 2014 Mole Valley District Council election =

2014 UK local government election

Results of the 2014 Mole Valley District Council election

The 2014 Mole Valley District Council election took place on 22 May 2014 to elect members of Mole Valley District Council in England. This was on the same day as other local elections.
