= 2014 Broxbourne Borough Council election =

2014 UK local government election

The 2014 Broxbourne Borough Council election took place on 22 May 2014 to elect members of Broxbourne Borough Council in England. This was on the same day as other local elections.

== Election result ==
Broxbourne Borough Council Election result 2014
Party	Seats	Gains	Losses	Net gain/loss	Seats %	Votes %	Votes	+/−
Conservative	9	0	1	-1	81.8	46.0	10,725	-17.4
UKIP	1	1	0	+1	9.1	32.8	7,655	+27.0
Labour	1	0	0	0	9.1	19.2	4,469	-8.0
Independent	0	0	0	0	0.0	1.1	259	New
Liberal Democrats	0	0	0	0	0.0	0.9	210	-2.8

== Ward results ==
Broxbourne and Hoddesdon South
Party	Candidate	Votes	%	±%
Conservative	Susie Macleod	1,643	57.1	
UKIP	Evelyn Faulkner	737	25.6	
Labour	John Rees	288	10.0	
Liberal Democrats	Kirstie de Rivaz	210	7.3	
Majority		906	31.5	
Turnout		2,878	38.5	
Conservative hold		Swing		

Cheshunt North
Party	Candidate	Votes	%	±%
Conservative	Mike Iszatt	1,043	46.8	
UKIP	Michael Habermel	726	32.6	
Labour	Marian Palmer	460	20.6	
Majority		317	14.2	
Turnout		2,229	32.8	
Conservative hold		Swing		

Cheshunt South and Theobalds
Party	Candidate	Votes	%	±%
Conservative	Cody McCormick	1,012	45.8	
UKIP	Dawn Bloor	688	31.1	
Labour	Gillian Lawrence	512	23.1	
Majority		324	14.7	
Turnout		2,212	32.2	
Conservative hold		Swing		

Flamstead End
Party	Candidate	Votes	%	±%
Conservative	Sue Ball-Greenwood	1,071	48.0	
UKIP	Paul Ashcroft	813	36.4	
Labour	Rosemary Trundell	348	15.6	
Majority		258	11.6	
Turnout		2,232	32.7	
Conservative hold		Swing		

Goffs Oak
Party	Candidate	Votes	%	±%
Conservative	Mark Mills-Bishop	1,293	58.4	
UKIP	Stephen Coster	649	29.3	
Labour	Cherry Robbins	272	12.3	
Majority		644	29.1	
Turnout		2,214	31.5	
Conservative hold		Swing		

Hoddesdon North
Party	Candidate	Votes	%	±%
Conservative	Lyn White	1,278	48.6	
UKIP	Salvatore Scozzaro	952	36.2	
Labour	Alex Harvey	401	15.2	
Majority		326	12.4	
Turnout		2,631	34.9	
Conservative hold		Swing		

Hoddesdon Town and Rye Park
Party	Candidate	Votes	%	±%
UKIP	David Platt	898	41.4	
Conservative	Tony Infantino	869	40.1	
Labour	Roy Wareham	402	18.5	
Majority		29	1.3	
Turnout		2,169	31.1	
UKIP gain from Conservative		Swing		

Rosedale and Bury Green
Party	Candidate	Votes	%	±%
Conservative	Yvonne Mobbs	956	43.9	
UKIP	Tony Faulkner	797	36.6	
Labour	Alexander McInnes	424	19.5	
Majority		159	7.3	
Turnout		2,177	31.8	
Conservative hold		Swing		

Waltham Cross
Party	Candidate	Votes	%	±%
Labour	Carol Bowman	863	36.6	
Conservative	Pat Leslie	644	27.3	
UKIP	Sidney Pratt	595	25.2	
Independent	Jamie Monde	259	11.0	
Majority		219	9.3	
Turnout		2,361	30.8	
Labour hold		Swing		

Wormley and Turnford (2)
Party	Candidate	Votes	%	±%
Conservative	David Taylor	916	41.4	
Conservative	Gordon Nicholson	894		
UKIP	Shirley Habermel	800	36.1	
UKIP	Shirley Pratt	764		
Labour	Ed Hopwood	499	22.5	
Labour	Mandy Tucker	463		
Majority		94		
Turnout			28.0	
Conservative hold		Swing		
Conservative hold		Swing		
