= 2014 North East Lincolnshire Council election =

2014 UK local government election

Results by ward.

The 2014 North East Lincolnshire Council election took place on 22 May 2014 to elect members of North East Lincolnshire Council in England. This was on the same day as other local elections. These elections saw UKIP making significant gains largely at the expense of Labour, and stripping them of their majority on the council.

== Council make up ==
After the 2014 local elections, the political make up of the council was as follows:

Party	Number of councillors
Labour	21
Conservative	10
Liberal Democrats	3
UKIP	8
Green	0
Independent	0

These elections saw UKIP make significant gains on the council, ultimately stripping the Labour administration of a majority. The results led to UKIP heavily targeting the area at the general election the following year, but this came with little success and they would only gain one council seat in 2015, whilst coming third in both the Great Grimsby and Cleethorpes constituencies.

The Liberal Democrats were seen to have had some comfort in holding two of their defensive seats (East Marsh and Park), considering they lost all their defensive seats at the last elections in 2012 and only won one in 2011, but with their failure to regain Yarborough after their remaining councillor defected to Labour, they had their lowest number of councillors on the authority since its creation.

== Ward results ==
=== Croft Baker ===
Croft Baker 2014
Party	Candidate	Votes	%	±%
Labour	Matthew Jason Brown	1031		
UKIP	Christopher James Osborne	885		
Independent	Leanor Mary Pidgen	424		
Conservative	Debbie Landymore	352		
TUSC	Roy Thomas Crampton	104		
Liberal Democrats	Sarah Elaine Hughes	61		
Majority		146		
Labour hold		Swing		

Note: Pidgen was a former Liberal Democrat councillor that represented this ward from 2003 to 2012.

=== East Marsh ===
East Marsh 2014
Party	Candidate	Votes	%	±%
Liberal Democrats	Stephen Beasant	907		
UKIP	Phillip John Dumbrell	422		
Labour	Annie Darby	369		
Green	Andrew Dickson	46		
TUSC	Philip Martin Tuplin	22		
Majority		485		
Liberal Democrats hold		Swing		

Notes: Beasant was the only winning candidate to have achieved an outright majority of votes (ie: over 50% of the vote share). Darby was elected as a Lib Dem councillor for Yarborough in 2010 and defected to Labour (like many Lib Dem councillors on this authority) mid-term. Dumbrell contested this seat as an Independent in 2008; and then as a Conservative in 2010, 2011 and 2012.

=== Freshney ===
Freshney 2014
Party	Candidate	Votes	%	±%
UKIP	Nicholas Robert Pettigrew	763		
Labour	Kathryn Helen Wheatley	631		
Conservative	Graham Reynolds	394		
Liberal Democrats	Douglas Victor Pickett	85		
Green	Andrew Lingwood	73		
TUSC	Ian Michael Radford	32		
Majority		132		
UKIP gain from Labour		Swing		

Notes: Wheatley previously represented East Marsh from 1999 to 2003. Pickett previously represented the ward of Great Coates (a village which this ward contains) from 1984 to 1988 on the since-abolished Great Grimsby Borough Council which preceded this authority. He is also a former councillor for the South Ward from 2003 to 2010 on this authority.

=== Haverstoe ===
Haverstoe 2014
Party	Candidate	Votes	%	±%
Conservative	Margaret Cracknell	1403		
UKIP	Paul Wood	939		
Labour	Jack Robert Connor	547		
Liberal Democrats	Roy Horobin	133		
Green	Victoria Anne Dunn	86		
Majority		464		
Conservative hold		Swing		

=== Heneage ===
Heneage 2014
Party	Candidate	Votes	%	±%
UKIP	John Matthew Stockton	918		
Labour	Karl Wilson	779		
Conservative	David Rimmer Walker	408		
Liberal Democrats	Abby McKenna	108		
Green	Andy Fox	97		
TUSC	Val O’Flynn	43		
Majority		139		
UKIP gain from Labour		Swing		

=== Humberston & New Waltham ===
Humberston & New Waltham 2014
Party	Candidate	Votes	%	±%
UKIP	Stephen William Harness	1521		
Conservative	Stan Shreeve	1062		
Labour	Gareth Luke Carter	533		
Majority		459		
UKIP gain from Conservative		Swing		

Note: Harness gained his seat at a by-election the previous year, so is theoretically a hold.

=== Immingham ===
Immingham 2014
Party	Candidate	Votes	%	±%
Labour	David Bolton	960		
UKIP	Andy Warwick	952		
Conservative	Stewart Swinburn	787		
Green	Martin Reed	112		
TUSC	Andrew Jonathan Simon Smith	49		
Majority		8		
Labour hold		Swing		

Notes: This result was announced after a series of recounts, due to how marginal the result was between the top two candidates. Swinburn previously represented the ward between 2003 and 2011.

=== Park ===
Park 2014
Party	Candidate	Votes	%	±%
Liberal Democrats	Christina McGilligan-Fell	867		
UKIP	Stephen Whittingham	796		
Conservative	Tom Furneaux	614		
Labour	Liz Haddock	577		
Green	Jacqueline Vessey	165		
TUSC	Joseph George Coombs	42		
Majority		71		
Liberal Democrats hold		Swing		

Note: Whittingham contested Waltham as a Lib Dem in 2003.

=== Scartho ===
Scartho 2014
Party	Candidate	Votes	%	±%
UKIP	Henry Richard Hudson	1233		
Conservative	Sally Michelle Dixon	960		
Labour	Catherine Harper	549		
Liberal Democrats	Graham Frederick Hicks	179		
Majority		273		
UKIP gain from Conservative		Swing		

Notes: Hudson previously contested Freshney in 2008 as a Conservative, before standing in Great Grimsby in the 2010 general election for UKIP. He also contested Wolds in 2011 and East Marsh in 2012 for UKIP. Dixon previously contested this seat as a Liberal Democrat in 2010 and 2011, and as a Conservative in 2012.

=== South ===
South 2014
Party	Candidate	Votes	%	±%
UKIP	Jane Elizabeth Bramley	690		
Labour	Callum David Stanland	660		
Independent	Debbie Hill	238		
Conservative	Hayden Dawkins	200		
Liberal Democrats	Susan Lindsay Pickett	97		
Green	Luke Hardy	52		
Majority		30		
UKIP gain from Labour		Swing		

Note: Bramley was elected as a Labour councillor in 2010, but defected to UKIP in 2013, so theoretically holds her seat. A recount was called, due to the closeness between her and the runner-up. Pickett is a former councillor for this ward from 2004 to 2012. Hill previously contested this ward as an Independent in 2006, later contesting Sidney Sussex in 2008 and Immingham in 2010 as a Liberal Democrat.

=== Sidney Sussex ===
Sidney Sussex 2014
Party	Candidate	Votes	%	±%
UKIP	Matthew George Stinson	891		
Labour	Alexander Wallace	584		
Conservative	Richard Hardy	369		
TUSC	Malcolm Morland	126		
Independent	George Kampanella Georgiou	89		
Liberal Democrats	Nicola Dawn Hocknell	79		
Majority		307		
UKIP gain from Labour		Swing		

Note: Morland was a former Labour councillor for this ward from 1995 until 1999, when he changed seats to Croft Baker until standing down in 2003. He later became a councillor for this ward again but as a Liberal Democrat from 2006 to 2010. He also stood in the Cleethorpes constituency in the 2010 general election.

=== Waltham ===
Waltham 2014
Party	Candidate	Votes	%	±%
Conservative	Iain Black Colquhoun	889		
UKIP	Guy Thomas Twisleton Haxby	664		
Labour	Ashley David Smith	389		
Liberal Democrats	Eleanor Fell	76		
Majority		225		
Conservative hold		Swing		

=== West Marsh ===
West Marsh 2014
Party	Candidate	Votes	%	±%
Labour	Tim Mickleburgh	434		
UKIP	Paul David Batson	325		
Independent	Peter Michael Barker	247		
Independent	Keith Watkin	135		
TUSC	David William Mitchell	32		
Majority		109		
Labour hold		Swing		

Note: This was the only ward in the Great Grimsby constituency which Labour held on to at these elections. Watkin and Barker are former councillors for this ward who were elected in 1999 as Independents, until losing their seats to Labour in 2010 and 2011 respectively.

=== Wolds ===
Wolds 2014
Party	Candidate	Votes	%	±%
Conservative	David Anthony Hasthorpe	911		
UKIP	John William Chapman	676		
Labour	Christopher Francis Swale	408		
Majority		235		
Conservative hold		Swing		

=== Yarborough ===
Yarborough 2014
Party	Candidate	Votes	%	±%
UKIP	James David Cairns	957		
Labour	May Dodds	717		
Conservative	Rhys Dane Cook	387		
Liberal Democrats	Sarah Leak	175		
TUSC	Ben Leech	42		
Majority		240		
UKIP gain from Liberal Democrats		Swing		

Note: The incumbent Liberal Democrat councillor, Annie Darby, defected to Labour during her previous term and was selected to contest East Marsh (see above).
