= 2014 South Tyneside Metropolitan Borough Council election =

2014 UK local government election

Map of results

The 2014 South Tyneside Metropolitan Borough Council election took place on 22 May 2014 to elect members of South Tyneside Metropolitan Borough Council in England. This was on the same day as other local elections.

Party political make-up of South Tyneside Council
| Party | Seats | | | Council Composition 1 December 2014 |
| Party | 2011 | 2012 | 2014 | Council Composition 1 December 2014 |
|---|---|---|---|---|
| Labour | 39 | 48 | 49 | |
| UKIP | 0 | 1 | 2 | |
| Independent | 11 | 4 | 2 | |
| Conservative | 3 | 1 | 1 | |
| Progressives | 2 | 0 | 0 | |
| Liberal Democrats | 2 | 1 | 0 | |

== Results by electoral ward ==
=== Beacon & Bents ward ===
Beacon & Bents
| Party | Candidate | Votes | % | ±% |
|---|---|---|---|---|
| Labour | John Wood | 1,254 | 50.7 | +3.4 |
| UKIP | John Clarke | 735 | 29.7 | N/A |
| Conservative | Ali Hayder | 367 | 14.9 | +5.2 |
| Liberal Democrats | Bill Troupe | 115 | 4.7 | N/A |
| Majority | | 519 | 21.0 | |
| Turnout | | 2,483 | 36.0 | −19.4 |
| Labour hold | | Swing | | |

=== Bede ward ===
Bede
| Party | Candidate | Votes | % | ±% |
|---|---|---|---|---|
| Independent - Putting People First | Lee Hughes | 1,055 | 53.5 | N/A |
| Labour | Arthur Meeks | 818 | 41.5 | −9.2 |
| Conservative | Oliver Wallhead | 99 | 5.0 | N/A |
| Majority | | 237 | 12.0 | |
| Turnout | | 1,987 | 33.0 | −19.1 |
| Independent - Putting People First gain from Labour | | Swing | | |

=== Biddick & All Saints ward ===
Biddick & All Saints
| Party | Candidate | Votes | % | ±% |
|---|---|---|---|---|
| Labour | Olive Punchion | 1,076 | 60.5 | +8.2 |
| UKIP | John Wright | 593 | 33.3 | N/A |
| Conservative | Dorothy Byers | 111 | 6.2 | −1.9 |
| Majority | | 483 | 27.2 | |
| Turnout | | 1,788 | 27.7 | −22.6 |
| Labour hold | | Swing | | |

=== Boldon Colliery ward ===
Boldon Colliery
| Party | Candidate | Votes | % | ±% |
|---|---|---|---|---|
| Labour | Alison Strike | 1,459 | 58.5 | −6.9 |
| UKIP | Joseph Quirk | 681 | 27.3 | N/A |
| Conservative | Stewart Hay | 353 | 14.2 | −10.3 |
| Majority | | 778 | 31.2 | |
| Turnout | | 2503 | 34.1 | −25.0 |
| Labour hold | | Swing | | |

=== Cleadon & East Boldon ward ===
Cleadon & East Boldon
| Party | Candidate | Votes | % | ±% |
|---|---|---|---|---|
| Labour | Margaret Meling | 1,249 | 40.1 | +0.1 |
| Conservative | Fiona Milburn | 1,153 | 37.0 | −4.6 |
| UKIP | Russell Sanderson | 713 | 22.9 | N/A |
| Majority | | 96 | 3.1 | |
| Turnout | | 3,127 | 44.9 | −27.8 |
| Labour gain from Conservative | | Swing | | |

=== Cleadon Park ward ===
Cleadon Park
| Party | Candidate | Votes | % | ±% |
|---|---|---|---|---|
| Labour | Jim Foreman | 726 | 37.8 | −4.2 |
| Independent - Putting People First | June Elsom | 673 | 35.1 | +8.8 |
| Independent | Colin Campbell | 376 | 19.6 | N/A |
| Conservative | Barbara Surtees | 144 | 7.5 | −9.3 |
| Majority | | 53 | 2.7 | |
| Turnout | | 1,930 | 34.6 | −20.9 |
| Labour hold | | Swing | | |

=== Fellgate & Hedworth ward ===
Fellgate & Hedworth
| Party | Candidate | Votes | % | ±% |
|---|---|---|---|---|
| Labour | Geraldine Kilgour | 1,163 | 51.1 | +9.4 |
| UKIP | Steven Harrison | 981 | 43.1 | +1.0 |
| Conservative | Ian Armstrong | 132 | 5.8 | −3.7 |
| Majority | | 182 | 8.0 | |
| Turnout | | 2,286 | 39.1 | −20.2 |
| Labour gain from Independent | | Swing | | |

=== Harton ward ===
Harton
| Party | Candidate | Votes | % | ±% |
|---|---|---|---|---|
| Labour | Neil Maxwell | 1,144 | 49.9 | +6.8 |
| UKIP | Malcolm Pratt | 783 | 34.1 | N/A |
| Conservative | Mark Ralston | 367 | 16.0 | +1.9 |
| Majority | | 361 | 15.8 | |
| Turnout | | 2,306 | 34.1 | −25.4 |
| Labour hold | | Swing | | |

=== Hebburn North ward ===
Hebburn North
| Party | Candidate | Votes | % | ±% |
|---|---|---|---|---|
| Labour | Richie Porthouse | 941 | 45.8 | −4.6 |
| Independent | Joe Abbott | 635 | 30.9 | N/A |
| UKIP | David Lawson | 389 | 18.9 | N/A |
| Conservative | Amy-Jane Milburn | 91 | 4.4 | N/A |
| Majority | | 306 | 14.9 | |
| Turnout | | 2,065 | 30.7 | −23.5 |
| Labour hold | | Swing | | |

=== Hebburn South ward ===
Hebburn South
| Party | Candidate | Votes | % | ±% |
|---|---|---|---|---|
| Labour | Nancy Maxwell | 1,509 | 65.7 | +6.9 |
| UKIP | Victoria Morris | 589 | 25.6 | N/A |
| Conservative | John Coe | 200 | 8.7 | −5.4 |
| Majority | | 920 | 40.1 | |
| Turnout | | 2,311 | 38.5 | −23.9 |
| Labour hold | | Swing | | |

=== Horsley Hill ward ===
Horsley Hill
| Party | Candidate | Votes | % | ±% |
|---|---|---|---|---|
| Labour | Eileen Leask | 1,271 | 48.4 | +0.4 |
| UKIP | Kelly Loftus | 715 | 27.2 | N/A |
| Conservative | Marilyn Huartt | 346 | 13.2 | +0.9 |
| Independent Socialist Party | Phil Brown | 293 | 11.2 | N/A |
| Majority | | 556 | 21.2 | |
| Turnout | | 2,637 | 37.1 | −24.6 |
| Labour hold | | Swing | | |

=== Monkton ward ===
Monkton
| Party | Candidate | Votes | % | ±% |
|---|---|---|---|---|
| Labour | Jim Sewell | 1,267 | 61.5 | +18.4 |
| UKIP | Jackie Quirk | 603 | 29.2 | N/A |
| Conservative | James Milburn | 192 | 9.3 | +0.6 |
| Majority | | 664 | 32.2 | |
| Turnout | | 2,074 | 32.9 | −28.0 |
| Labour hold | | Swing | | |

=== Primrose ward ===
Primrose
| Party | Candidate | Votes | % | ±% |
|---|---|---|---|---|
| Labour | Moira Smith | 1,070 | 57.8 | +5.1 |
| UKIP | Anita Campbell | 647 | 34.9 | N/A |
| Conservative | Jack Gibbons | 135 | 7.3 | −1.9 |
| Majority | | 423 | 22.9 | |
| Turnout | | 1,862 | 29.4 | −22.5 |
| Labour hold | | Swing | | |

=== Simonside & Rekendyke ward ===
Simonside & Rekendyke
| Party | Candidate | Votes | % | ±% |
|---|---|---|---|---|
| Labour | Lynne Proudlock | 1,056 | 56.1 | +1.3 |
| UKIP | Sandra Scoular | 643 | 34.1 | N/A |
| Conservative | Stan Wallace | 104 | 5.5 | −5.9 |
| Liberal Democrats | Carole Troupe | 81 | 4.3 | −11.5 |
| Majority | | 413 | 22.0 | |
| Turnout | | 1,883 | 30.3 | −20.1 |
| Labour hold | | Swing | | |

=== West Park ward ===
West Park
| Party | Candidate | Votes | % | ±% |
|---|---|---|---|---|
| Labour | Norman Dick | 818 | 45.1 | +7.7 |
| UKIP | Henry Pearce | 714 | 39.3 | N/A |
| Conservative | Anthony Dailly | 284 | 15.6 | +1.3 |
| Majority | | 104 | 5.8 | |
| Turnout | | 1,821 | 32.5 | −23.0 |
| Labour hold | | Swing | | |

=== Westoe ward ===
Westoe
| Party | Candidate | Votes | % | ±% |
|---|---|---|---|---|
| Labour | Allan West | 966 | 44.8 | +7.1 |
| UKIP | Norman Dennis | 818 | 38.0 | N/A |
| Conservative | Eddy Russell | 371 | 17.2 | +2.6 |
| Majority | | 148 | 6.8 | |
| Turnout | | 2,178 | 34.7 | −24.4 |
| Labour hold | | Swing | | |

=== Whitburn & Marsden ward ===
Whitburn & Marsden
| Party | Candidate | Votes | % | ±% |
|---|---|---|---|---|
| Labour | Peter Boyack | 1,124 | 50.4 | −2.4 |
| UKIP | Steven Dorothy | 751 | 33.7 | N/A |
| Conservative | Sharon Surtees | 355 | 15.9 | −8.2 |
| Majority | | 373 | 16.7 | |
| Turnout | | 2,248 | 38.1 | −26.1 |
| Labour hold | | Swing | | |

=== Whiteleas ward ===
Whiteleas
| Party | Candidate | Votes | % | ±% |
|---|---|---|---|---|
| Labour | Bill Brady | 1,223 | 58.1 | −1.5 |
| UKIP | Paul McKean | 750 | 35.7 | N/A |
| Conservative | Cyril Campbell | 131 | 6.2 | −4.6 |
| Majority | | 473 | 22.4 | |
| Turnout | | 2,114 | 32.5 | −21.8 |
| Labour hold | | Swing | | |
