= 2014 Brentwood Borough Council election =

2014 UK local government election

Results of the 2014 Brentwood Borough Council election

The 2014 Brentwood Borough Council election took place on 22 May 2014 to elect members of Brentwood Borough Council in England. This was on the same day as other local elections.

== Election result ==
Brentwood Borough Council election result 2014
Party	Seats	Gains	Losses	Net gain/loss	Seats %	Votes %	Votes	+/−
Conservative	6	0	3	-3				
Liberal Democrats	5	2	0	+2				
Labour	1	1	0	+1				
Independent	1	1	1	0				
UKIP	0	0	0	0				

== Ward results ==
Brentwood North
Party	Candidate	Votes	%	±%
Liberal Democrats	Phil Mynott	771		
UKIP	Mark Allen	381		
Conservative	Andrew Wiles	360		
Brentwood First	Ian Edmonds	166		
Labour	Neil McAree	154		
Majority		390		
Turnout		1836	34.6%	
Liberal Democrats hold		Swing		

Brentwood South
Party	Candidate	Votes	%	±%
Labour	Gareth Barrett	566		
UKIP	Wilfred Southgate	487		
Conservative	David Bishop	444		
Liberal Democrats	Gail Chatfield	155		
Majority		79		
Turnout		1660	36.9%	
Labour gain from Conservative		Swing		

Brentwood West
Party	Candidate	Votes	%	±%
Liberal Democrats	John Newberry	624		
Conservative	Paul Barrell	562		
UKIP	Peter Sceats	415		
Labour	Deborah Foster	217		
Majority		62		
Turnout		1830	33.6%	
Liberal Democrats gain from Independent		Swing		

Brizes & Doddinghurst
Party	Candidate	Votes	%	±%
Conservative	Keith Parker	864		
UKIP	Yvonne Maguire	726		
Liberal Democrats	Trevor Ellis	165		
Labour	Patricia Dedman	147		
Majority		138		
Turnout		1906	39.9%	
Conservative hold		Swing		

Herongate, Ingrave & West Horndon
Party	Candidate	Votes	%	±%
Brentwood First	Joanne Squirrell	646		
Conservative	Linda Golding	517		
Labour	Peter Norris	66		
Liberal Democrats	Cyril Young	54		
Socialist Labour	Damien Biggs	35		
Majority		129		
Turnout		1329	44.5%	
Independent gain from Conservative		Swing		

Hutton Central
Party	Candidate	Votes	%	±%
Conservative	Paul Faragher	675		
Independent	Janice Gearon-Simm	190		
Labour	David Smith	119		
Liberal Democrats	Wendy Antoniou	118		
Majority		485		
Turnout		1113	37.3%	
Conservative hold		Swing		

Hutton East
Party	Candidate	Votes	%	±%
Conservative	Olivia Sanders	564		
Liberal Democrats	Andrea Bowers	332		
Labour	Liam Preston	142		
Majority		232		
Turnout		1062	36.1%	
Conservative hold		Swing		

Hutton South
Party	Candidate	Votes	%	±%
Conservative	Roger Hirst	691		
UKIP	David Watt	262		
Brentwood First	Richard Lucioli-Brown	228		
Labour	David Burns	112		
Majority		429		
Turnout		1295	41%	
Conservative hold		Swing		

Ingatestone, Fryerning & Mountnessing
Party	Candidate	Votes	%	±%
Conservative	Jonathan Cloke	977		
UKIP	Janette Gulleford	595		
Labour	Jane Winter	295		
Liberal Democrats	Anne Long	197		
Majority		382		
Turnout		2081	42.1%	
Conservative hold		Swing		

Pilgrims Hatch
Party	Candidate	Votes	%	±%
Liberal Democrats	Barry Aspinell	866		
UKIP	Bryan Finegan	534		
Conservative	Thomas Bridge	298		
Labour	Richard Margrave	120		
Majority		332		
Turnout		1821	38.3%	
Liberal Democrats hold		Swing		

Shenfield
Party	Candidate	Votes	%	±%
Liberal Democrats	Elizabeth Cohen	892		
Conservative	Louise Rowlands	783		
UKIP	Mary Deacon	282		
Labour	Richard Millwood	81		
Majority		109		
Turnout		2040	47.4%	
Liberal Democrats hold		Swing		

South Weald
Party	Candidate	Votes	%	±%
Conservative	Anne Coe	302		
Brentwood First	Nigel Clarke	216		
UKIP	Clive Pulman	127		
Labour	Tim Barrett	36		
Majority		86		
Turnout		685	45.6%	
Conservative hold		Swing		

Warley
Party	Candidate	Votes	%	±%
Liberal Democrats	Jill Hubbard	880		
Conservative	Janet Pound	621		
UKIP	Wendy Warwick	314		
Labour	Susan Kortlandt	177		
Majority		259		
Turnout		2003	42%	
Liberal Democrats gain from Conservative		Swing		
