= 2014 Rochford District Council election =

2014 UK local government election

- 22 May 2014

13 seats (out of 39) 20 seats needed for a majority
	First party	Second party	Third party
Party	Conservative	UKIP	Liberal Democrats
Last election	31	0	4
Seats before	31	0	4
Seats won	28	3	3
Seat change	▼3	▲3	▼1
Popular vote	7,064	4,263	1,362
Percentage	38.5%	23.2%	7.4%
Swing	▼16.1%	▲21.4%	▲4.1%
	Fourth party	Fifth party	Sixth party
Party	Green	Rochford Resident	Labour
Last election	2	2	0
Seats before	2	2	0
Seats won	2	2	1
Seat change	Steady	Steady	▲1
Popular vote	1,849	853	2,474
Percentage	10.1%	4.6%	13.5%
Swing	▼1.3%	N/A	▼9.8%
- Results of the 2014 Rochford District Council election

The 2014 Rochford District Council election took place on 22 May 2014 to elect members of the Rochford District Council in England. They were held on the same day as other local elections.
