= 2014 Tunbridge Wells Borough Council election =

2014 UK local government election

Map of the results

The 2014 Tunbridge Wells Borough Council election took place on 22 May 2014 to elect members of Tunbridge Wells Borough Council in England. This was on the same day as other local elections.

== Ward results ==
=== Benenden and Cranbook ===
Benenden and Cranbook
Party	Candidate	Votes	%	±%
Conservative	Tom Dawlings	876	42	
Liberal Democrats	Francis Rook	541	26	
UKIP	Simon Hilton	468	23	
Labour	Isobel Kerrigan	188	9	
Majority		335		
Turnout		2,063		
Liberal Democrats gain from Conservative		Swing		

=== Brenchley and Horsmonden ===
Brenchley and Horsmonden
Party	Candidate	Votes	%	±%
Conservative	Alan McDermott	930	65	
UKIP	David Weatherley	334	20	
Labour	Kevin Kerrigan	263	16	
Liberal Democrats	Nancy Warne	123	7	
Majority		596		
Turnout		1,645		
Conservative hold		Swing		

=== Broadwater ===
Broadwater
Party	Candidate	Votes	%	±%
Conservative	Chris Woodward	577	46	
UKIP	Alun Elder-Brown	393	31	
Labour	Clive Brewer	196	16	
Liberal Democrats	Christopher Jeffery	95	8	
Majority		184		
Turnout		1,256		
Conservative gain from Liberal Democrats		Swing		

=== Culverden ===
Culverden
Party	Candidate	Votes	%	±%
Conservative	Don Sloan	988	47	
UKIP	Patricia Underwood	390	19	
Liberal Democrats	Alan Bullion	267	13	
Green	Rick Leslie	229	11	
Labour	Veronica Wallace	218	10	
Majority		598		
Turnout		2,085		
Conservative hold		Swing		

=== Hawkhurst and Sandhurst ===
Hawkhurst and Sandhurst
Party	Candidate	Votes	%	±%
Conservative	Nathan Gray	940	51	
UKIP	John Austen	537	29	
Green	Marie Jones	139	8	
Labour	David Burgess	131	7	
Liberal Democrats	Tom Deacon	89	5	
Majority		403		
Turnout		1,832		
Conservative hold		Swing		

=== Paddock Wood East ===
Paddock Wood East
Party	Candidate	Votes	%	±%
Conservative	Bill Hills	562	44	
UKIP	Thomas Chetta	471	37	
Labour	Terry White	144	11	
Liberal Democrats	Mark Bicknell	93	7	
Majority		91		
Turnout		1,269		
Conservative hold		Swing		

=== Paddock Wood West ===
Paddock Wood West
Party	Candidate	Votes	%	±%
Conservative	Elizabeth Thomas	494	44	
UKIP	Bob Davison	350	31	
Labour	Ray Moon	219	19	
Liberal Democrats	Matthew Warne	71	6	
Majority		144		
Turnout		1,131		
Conservative hold		Swing		

=== Pantiles and St. Mark's ===
Pantiles and St. Mark's
Party	Candidate	Votes	%	±%
Conservative	James Scholes	1,137	56	
UKIP	Kit Read	326	16	
Labour	Lorna Blackmore	297	15	
Liberal Democrats	Geoffrey Bent	284	14	
Majority		811		
Turnout		2,033		
Conservative hold		Swing		

=== Park ===
Park
Party	Candidate	Votes	%	±%
Conservative	Catherine Mayhew	1,086	49	
UKIP	Andrew Osborne	488	22	
Labour	Mary Wilson	348	16	
Liberal Democrats	Jacqueline Prance	277	13	
Majority		598		
Turnout		2,186		
Conservative hold		Swing		

=== Pembury ===
Pembury
Party	Candidate	Votes	%	±%
Conservative	Paul Barrington-King	853	41	
UKIP	Colin Nicholson	572	27	
Independent	Terry Cload	445	21	
Labour	Margaret Morgan	130	6	
Liberal Democrats	Rachel Sadler	92	4	
Majority		281		
Turnout		2,088		
Conservative hold		Swing		

=== Sherwood ===
Sherwood
Party	Candidate	Votes	%	±%
Conservative	Bob Backhouse	813	47	
UKIP	Stephen Lukacs	578	33	
Labour	Nick Maltby	249	14	
Liberal Democrats	Victor Bethell	93	5	
Majority		235		
Turnout		1,726		
Conservative hold		Swing		

=== Southborough and High Brooms ===
Southborough and High Brooms
Party	Candidate	Votes	%	±%
Labour	Graham Munn	602	32	
Conservative	Peter Oakford	591	32	
UKIP	Richard Harrington	486	26	
Liberal Democrats	Marguerita Morton	190	10	
Majority		11		
Turnout		1,856		
Labour gain from Conservative		Swing		

=== Southborough North ===
Southborough North
Party	Candidate	Votes	%	±%
Conservative	Mike Rusbridge	790	56	
Labour	Nicholas Blackwell	233	16	
UKIP	Mark Nicholson	219	15	
Liberal Democrats	Jo Wright	181	13	
Majority		557		
Turnout		1,416		
Conservative hold		Swing		

=== Speldhurst and Bidborough ===
Speldhurst and Bidborough
Party	Candidate	Votes	%	±%
Conservative	Julia Soyke	1,255	61	
UKIP	Nick Frydas	396	19	
Liberal Democrats	Robert Baldock	201	10	
Labour	Ann Tyler	198	10	
Majority		859		
Turnout		2,038		
Conservative hold		Swing		

=== St. James' ===
St. James'
Party	Candidate	Votes	%	±%
Liberal Democrats	David Neve	751	53	
Conservative	Alex Lewis-Grey	247	17	
UKIP	Naz Mian	246	17	
Labour	Jaimi Lallu	184	13	
Majority		504		
Turnout		1,418		
Liberal Democrats hold		Swing		

=== St. John's ===
St. John's
Party	Candidate	Votes	%	±%
Conservative	Jamil Nasir	711	35	
Liberal Democrats	Trevor Poile	646	32	
UKIP	Simon Ford-Forrester	309	15	
Labour	Timothy Rich	187	9	
Green	Phyl Leslie	174	9	
Majority		65		
Turnout		2,018		
Conservative gain from Liberal Democrats		Swing		
