= 2014 Gateshead Metropolitan Borough Council election =

2014 UK local government election

Results of the 2014 Gateshead Metropolitan Borough Council election

Held on 22 May 2014 as part of the wider 2014 United Kingdom local elections, the Metropolitan Borough of Gateshead had 22 of its 66 seats up for election under the common one-thirds system. All of these councillors were elected for four year terms.

== Election Breakdown by Ward ==
=== Birtley ===
Birtley ward 2014
Party	Candidate	Votes	%	±%
Labour	Paul Foy	1,208	55.6	
Liberal	Kathy King	743	34.2	
Conservative	Andrea Gatiss	220	10.1	
Majority		465		
Turnout				

=== Blaydon ===
Blaydon ward 2014
Party	Candidate	Votes	%	±%
Labour	Kathryn Ferdinand	1,302	57.7	
UKIP	Glynis Legatt	620	27	
Conservative	Edward Ainscow	205	9.1	
Liberal Democrats	Stuart John McClurey	128	5.7	
Majority		682		
Turnout				

=== Bridges ===
Bridges ward 2014
Party	Candidate	Votes	%	±%
Labour	Angela Douglas	1,065	61.1	
UKIP	Tom Hall	404	23.2	
Conservative	John Gardiner	149	8.5	
Liberal Democrats	Phil Hunter	126	7.2	
Majority		661		
Turnout				

=== Chopwell and Rowlands Gill ===
Chopwell and Rowlands Gill ward 2014
Party	Candidate	Votes	%	±%
Labour	Lynn Caffrey	1,701	60.0	
UKIP	Dave Brothers	718	25.2	
Conservative	Karl Gatiss	254	8.9	
Liberal Democrats	Amelia Louise Lowery	167	5.9	
Majority		989		
Turnout				

=== Chowdene ===
Chowdene ward 2014
Party	Candidate	Votes	%	±%
Labour	Maureen Goldsworthy	1,697	65.5	
Conservative	John Callanan	483	18.7	
TUSC	Mark Robertson	249	9.6	
Liberal Democrats	Edna May Graham	160	6.2	
Majority		1,214		
Turnout				

=== Crawcrook and Greenside ===
Crawcrook and Greenside ward 2014
Party	Candidate	Votes	%	±%
Labour	Jack Graham	1,562	61.5	
Liberal Democrats	Tom David Hancock	356	14.0	
Green	Ralf Russow	319	12.6	
Conservative	Jeremy Peter Fry	301	11.9	
Majority		1,206		
Turnout				

=== Deckham ===
Deckham ward 2014
Party	Candidate	Votes	%	±%
Labour	Martin Gannon	1,323	64.9	
Conservative	May Ainscow	240	11.8	
TUSC	Corrina Helene Smith	178	8.7	
Liberal Democrats	Daniel Stephen Duggan	113	5.5	
Majority		1,083		
Turnout				

=== Dunston and Teams ===
Dunston and Teams ward 2014
Party	Candidate	Votes	%	±%
Labour	Pauline Dillon	1,053	58.4	
UKIP	Paul Innerd	468	26.0	
Green	Andy Blanchflower	104	5.8	
Liberal Democrats	David Lumsden	51	2.8	
Conservative	Christopher James MacAllister	127	7.0	
Majority		585		
Turnout				

=== Dunston Hill and Whickham East ===
Dunston Hill and Whickham East ward 2014
Party	Candidate	Votes	%	±%
Labour	Alison Elizabeth Chatto	1,046	37.1	
Liberal Democrats	Kevin Philip McClurey	968	34	34.4
UKIP	Dot Lynch	527	18.7	
Conservative	Jak Hocking	167	5.9	
Green	Mary Blanchflower	108	3.8	
Majority		78		
Turnout				

=== Felling ===
Felling ward 2014
Party	Candidate	Votes	%	±%
Labour	Bill Dick	1,111	59.4	
UKIP	Mick McGuire	501	26.8	
Conservative	Trevor Charles Murray	142	6.7	
Liberal Democrats	Ian Gill	61	3.3	
TUSC	Sam Neill	54	2.9	
Majority		610		
Turnout				

=== High Fell ===
High Fell ward 2014
Party	Candidate	Votes	%	±%
Labour	Doreen Davidson	1,107	58.9	
UKIP	Albert Mac	453	24.1	
Conservative	Edward Bohill	136	7.2	
TUSC	Elaine Brunskill	120	6.4	
Liberal Democrats	Norman Spours	63	3.4	
Majority		654		
Turnout				

=== Lamesley ===
Lamesley ward 2014
Party	Candidate	Votes	%	±%
Labour	Mary Foy (politician)	1,392	58.7	
Independent	Brian Weatherburn	449	18.9	
Conservative	Sheila Everatt	311	13.1	
Liberal	Betty Gallon	219	9.2	
Majority		943		
Turnout				

=== Lobley Hill and Bensham ===
Lobley Hill and Bensham ward 2014
Party	Candidate	Votes	%	±%
Labour	Kevin Michael Dodds	1,182	48.9	
UKIP	Jenny Colls-Kitchener	704	29.2	
Conservative	Valerie Bond	189	7.8	
Liberal Democrats	Dave G Fawcett	181	7.5	
Green	Andy Redfern	159	6.6	
Majority		478		
Turnout				

=== Low Fell ===
Low Fell ward 2014
Party	Candidate	Votes	%	±%
Liberal Democrats	Susan Craig	1,348	43.1	
Labour	Stephen Gibson	997	31.9	
UKIP	John Tennant	538	17.2	
Conservative	Paul Sterling	213	6.8	
People's Democratic Party	Lee Robert Holmes	30	1.0	
Majority		997		
Turnout				

=== Pelaw and Heworth ===
Pelaw and Heworth ward 2014
Party	Candidate	Votes	%	±%
Labour	Anne Adelaide Wheeler	1,096	48.0	
Liberal Democrats	Ian Patterson	652	28.5	
UKIP	Mark Douglas	442	19.3	
Conservative	Maureen Moor	95	4.2	
Majority				
Turnout				

=== Ryton, Crookhill and Stella ===
Ryton, Crookhill and Stella ward 2014
Party	Candidate	Votes	%	±%
Liberal Democrats	Christine Margaret McHatton	1,158	37.4	
Labour	Jon Comb	1,027	33.2	
UKIP	Alan Robert Craig	671	21.7	
Green	Sarah McKeown	149	4.8	
Conservative	Antoinette Margaret Sterling	90	2.9	
Majority		131		
Turnout				

=== Saltwell ===
Saltwell ward 2014
Party	Candidate	Votes	%	±%
Labour	John Frederick Adams	1,218	62.0	
UKIP	John Kitchener	414	21.1	
Conservative	Alan Bond	213	10.9	
Liberal Democrats	Robinson Geoffrey Stanaway	118	6.0	
Majority		804		
Turnout				

=== Wardley and Leam Lane ===
Wardley and leam lane ward 2014
Party	Candidate	Votes	%	±%
Labour	Peter James Mole	1,429	65.0	
Green	Stephen Watson	370	16.8	
Conservative	Elizabeth Alexandrina Parker	266	12.1	
Liberal Democrats	John Paul Diston	134	6.1	
Majority		1,059		
Turnout				

=== Whickham North ===
Whickham North ward 2014
Party	Candidate	Votes	%	±%
Liberal Democrats	Peter Thomas Craig	1,264	44.9	
Labour	Chris McHugh	963	34.2	
UKIP	Andrea Wright	445	15.8	
Conservative	Beryl Theresa Bennison	144	5.1	
Majority		301		
Turnout				

=== Whickham South and Sunniside ===
Whickham South and Sunniside ward 2014
Party	Candidate	Votes	%	±%
Liberal Democrats	Marilynn Ord	1,511	53.5	
Labour	Peter De-Vere	619	21.9	
UKIP	Mark Bell	430	15.2	
Conservative	Edward Gardner Parker	214	7.6	
TUSC	Joel Byers	50	1.8	
Majority		892		
Turnout				

=== Windy Nook and Whitehills ===
Windy Nook and Whitehills ward 2014
Party	Candidate	Votes	%	±%
Labour	Thomas Graham	1,364	58.9	
UKIP	Bill McCough	634	27.4	
Conservative	Kyle Murray	147	6.3	
Liberal Democrats	Karen Therese Crozier	105	4.5	
TUSC	Norman Hall	67	2.9	
Majority		730		
Turnout				

=== Winlaton and High Spen ===
Winlaton and High Spen ward 2014
Party	Candidate	Votes	%	±%
Labour	Marilyn Charlton	1,413	52.3	
UKIP	Ray Tolley	769	28.4	
Conservative	Diana Maria Moore	254	9.4	
Liberal Democrats	Sandra McClurey	139	5.1	
Green	Paul Martin Luke McNally	129	4.8	
Majority		644		
Turnout				
