= 2014 Purbeck District Council election =

2014 UK local government election

Map of the results of the 2014 Purbeck District Council election. Conservatives in blue and Liberal Democrats in yellow. Wards in grey were not contested.

The 2014 Purbeck District Council election took place on 22 May 2014 to elect members of Purbeck District Council in England. This was on the same day as other local elections.
