= 2014 Cherwell District Council election =

2014 UK local government election

Results of the 2014 Cherwell District Council election

The 2014 Cherwell District Council election took place on 22 May 2014 to elect members of Cherwell District Council in England. This was on the same day as other local elections.

== Election result ==
Cherwell election result 2014
Party	Seats	Gains	Losses	Net gain/loss	Seats %	Votes %	Votes	+/−
Conservative	13	1	2	▼1	76.5	42.1	11,020	▼10.4
Labour	3	2	0	▲2	17.6	23.2	6,073	▲7.3
UKIP	0	0	0	Steady	0.0	21.2	5,548	New
Liberal Democrats	1	0	1	▼1	5.9	6.9	1,801	▼24.7
Green	0	0	0	Steady	0.0	6.7	1,756	New

== Ward results ==
The Astons and Heyfords
Party	Candidate	Votes	%	±%
Conservative	James Macnamara	860	54.3	▼12.7
UKIP	Dickie Bird	296	18.7	New
Labour	Annette Murphy	180	11.4	New
Green	Jenny Tamblyn	169	10.7	New
Liberal Democrats	John Innes	79	5.0	▼28.0
Majority		564	35.6	▲1.6
Turnout		1,584		
Conservative hold		Swing		

Banbury Calthorpe
Party	Candidate	Votes	%	±%
Conservative	Colin Clarke	767	47.1	▼9.3
Labour	Sharon Derbe	395	24.3	▲3.7
UKIP	Christian Miller	337	20.7	New
Green	Christopher Manley	128	7.9	New
Majority		372	22.8	▼10.6
Turnout		1,627		
Conservative hold		Swing		

Banbury Easington
Party	Candidate	Votes	%	±%
Conservative	Kieron Mallon	1,209	49.0	▼7.9
UKIP	David Burton	553	22.4	New
Labour	Mary Evans	497	20.2	▼2.1
Green	Katherine Chandler	206	8.4	New
Majority		656	26.6	▼8.0
Turnout		2,465		
Conservative hold		Swing		

Banbury Grimsbury and Castle
Party	Candidate	Votes	%	±%
Labour	Claire Bell	950	41.0	▲11.2
Conservative	Tony Mepham	574	24.8	▼18.1
UKIP	Linda Wren	507	21.9	New
Green	John Haywood	184	7.9	New
Liberal Democrats	Kenneth Ashworth	103	4.4	▼22.9
Majority		376	16.2	N/A
Turnout		2,318		
Labour gain from Conservative		Swing		

Banbury Hardwick
Party	Candidate	Votes	%	±%
Conservative	Tony Ilott	624	32.9	▼15.5
UKIP	Ryan Wilkins	521	27.5	New
Labour	Keith Humphries	510	26.9	▲3.4
Green	Claire Peaman	138	7.3	New
Liberal Democrats	Anthony Burns	102	5.4	▼22.8
Majority		103	5.4	▼14.8
Turnout		1,895		
Conservative hold		Swing		

Banbury Neithrop
Party	Candidate	Votes	%	±%
Labour	Matt Johnstone	634	41.1	▲3.0
Conservative	Alyas Ahmed	433	28.1	▼10.7
UKIP	Jason Williams	363	23.5	New
Green	Andrew Aris	112	7.3	New
Majority		201	13.0	N/A
Turnout		1,542		
Labour gain from Conservative		Swing		

Banbury Ruscote
Party	Candidate	Votes	%	±%
Labour	Barry Richards	699	41.3	▼10.5
UKIP	Geordie Brown	552	32.6	New
Conservative	Nicola Smith	340	20.1	▼12.4
Green	Bernard Dod	100	5.9	New
Majority		147	8.7	▼10.6
Turnout		1,691		
Labour hold		Swing		

Bicester West
Party	Candidate	Votes	%	±%
Conservative	Norman Bolster	852	44.8	▼8.8
Labour	Polly Foster	543	28.6	▲3.7
UKIP	Darren Cain	505	26.6	New
Majority		309	16.2	▼12.5
Turnout		1,900		
Conservative hold		Swing		

Bloxham and Bodicote
Party	Candidate	Votes	%	±%
Conservative	Chris Heath	998	49.7	▼8.4
UKIP	Paul Tucker	364	18.1	New
Labour	Susan Christie	304	15.1	New
Green	Mary Franklin	185	9.2	New
Liberal Democrats	Peter Davis	158	7.9	▼34.0
Majority		634	31.6	▲15.4
Turnout		2,009		
Conservative hold		Swing		

Deddington
Party	Candidate	Votes	%	±%
Conservative	Bryn Williams	565	56.8	▼8.3
UKIP	Aubrey Ellis	144	14.5	New
Liberal Democrats	Ian Thomas	118	11.9	▼23.0
Green	Colin Clark	94	9.5	New
Labour	Christopher Farman	73	7.3	New
Majority		421	42.3	▲12.1
Turnout		994		
Conservative hold		Swing		

Fringford
Party	Candidate	Votes	%	±%
Conservative	Barry Wood	664	74.9	▼3.0
UKIP	Barbara Fairweather	130	14.7	New
Labour	Steven Uttley	92	10.4	New
Majority		534	60.2	▲4.4
Turnout		886		
Conservative hold		Swing		

Kidlington North
Party	Candidate	Votes	%	±%
Liberal Democrats	Douglas Williamson	584	34.3	▼19.3
Conservative	Sandra Rhodes	495	29.1	▼17.3
UKIP	Sara Corr	281	16.5	New
Labour	Chris Robins	236	13.9	New
Green	Fiona Mawson	106	6.2	New
Majority		89	5.2	▼2.0
Turnout		1,702		
Liberal Democrats hold		Swing		

Kidlington South
Party	Candidate	Votes	%	±%
Conservative	Carmen Griffiths	930	35.3	▼11.8
Liberal Democrats	Joe Claxton	596	22.6	▼30.3
UKIP	Alan Harris	520	19.7	New
Labour	David James	453	17.2	New
Green	Ian Middleton	138	5.2	New
Majority		334	12.7	N/A
Turnout		2,637		
Conservative gain from Liberal Democrats		Swing		

Kirtlington
Party	Candidate	Votes	%	±%
Conservative	Simon Holland	480	52.1	N/A
Labour	Andrew Hornsby-Smith	253	27.5	New
UKIP	Sebastian Fairweather	188	20.4	New
Majority		227	24.6	N/A
Turnout		921		
Conservative hold		Swing		

Otmoor
Party	Candidate	Votes	%	±%
Conservative	Timothy Hallchurch	Unopposed		
Conservative hold		Swing		

Sibford
Party	Candidate	Votes	%	±%
Conservative	George Reynolds	618	58.9	▼10.1
UKIP	Paul Clifton	146	13.9	New
Labour	Anne Davis	120	11.4	New
Green	John Batts	104	9.9	New
Liberal Democrats	Janice Johnson	61	5.8	▼25.2
Majority		472	45.0	▲7.0
Turnout		1,049		
Conservative hold		Swing		

Wroxton
Party	Candidate	Votes	%	±%
Conservative	Douglas Webb	611	62.5	▲2.9
UKIP	George Massingham	141	14.4	New
Labour	Derek Evans	134	13.7	New
Green	Rita White	92	9.4	New
Majority		470	48.1	▲28.9
Turnout		978		
Conservative hold		Swing		
