= 2014 Gosport Borough Council election =

2014 UK local government election

2014 Gosport Borough Council Election
- 22 May 2014

17 of 35 seats to Gosport Borough Council 18 seats needed for a majority
	First party	Second party
Party	Conservative	Liberal Democrats
Seats before	24	5
Seats won	9	4
Seats after	21	6
Seat change	▼3	▲1
Popular vote	9,651	2,688
Percentage	46.0%	12.8%
	Third party	Fourth party
Party	Labour	UKIP
Seats before	5	0
Seats won	3	1
Seats after	6	1
Seat change	▲1	▲1
Popular vote	5,040	3,426
Percentage	24.0%	16.3%
Council control before election
Conservative
Council control after election
Conservative

The 2014 Gosport Borough Council election took place on 22 May 2014 to elect members of Gosport Borough Council in England. This was on the same day as other local elections. UKIP gained its first representation on the council, with the Labour, the Liberal Democrats, and UKIP each gaining a seat from the Conservatives; whilst they had a reduced majority, the Conservatives remained in administration.

== Election result ==
Gosport local election result 2014
Party	Seats	Gains	Losses	Net gain/loss	Seats %	Votes %	Votes	+/−
Conservative	9	0	3	▼3		46.0	9,651	▼5.5
Liberal Democrats	4	1	0	▲1		12.8	2,688	▲
Labour	3	1	0	▲1		24.0	5,040	▼1.3
UKIP	1	1	0	▲1		16.3	3,426	
Green	Steady	0	0	Steady		0.5	111	▼0.5
Independent	Steady	0	0	Steady		0.4	82	

== Ward results ==
=== Alverstoke ===
Alverstoke
Party	Candidate	Votes	%	±%
Conservative	Peter Edgar	1,048	67.91	▲7.2
Labour	Jean Batterbury	495	32.08	▲15.2
Majority		553	35.83	
Turnout		1,543		
Conservative hold		Swing		

=== Anglesey ===
Anglesey
Party	Candidate	Votes	%	±%
Conservative	Alan Scard	1,059	81.83	▲3.4
Labour	Belinda Baker	235	18.16	▲6.9
Majority		824	63.67	
Turnout		1,294		
Conservative hold		Swing		

=== Bridgemary North ===
Bridgemary North
Party	Candidate	Votes	%	±%
Labour	Dennis Wright	829	71.46	▲8.6
Conservative	Lara Geddes	331	28.53	▼8.6
Majority		498	42.93	
Turnout		1,160		
Labour hold		Swing		

=== Bridgemary South ===
Bridgemary South
Party	Candidate	Votes	%	±%
Labour	Linda Batty	563	49.12	▲8.6
UKIP	Adrian Tomlinson	323	28.18	▲28.18
Conservative	Christopher Carter	260	22.68	▼55.7
Majority		240	20.94	
Turnout		1,146		
Labour gain from Conservative		Swing		

=== Brockhurst ===
Brockhurst
Party	Candidate	Votes	%	±%
Liberal Democrats	Austin Hicks	415	35.08	▼20.8
Conservative	Diane Furlong	292	24.68	▼3.3
UKIP	Scott Myers	283	23.92	▲23.9
Labour	Alan Durrant	111	9.38	▼6.7
Independent	Dale Fletcher	82	6.93	▲6.93
Majority		123	10.39	
Turnout		1183		
Liberal Democrats gain from Conservative		Swing		

=== Christchurch ===
Christchurch
Party	Candidate	Votes	%	±%
Conservative	Wayne Ronayne	423	34.14	▼4.7
Liberal Democrats	Dawn Kelly	407	32.84	▼0.7
UKIP	Catherine Andrews	273	22.03	▲10.1
Labour	Chris Noakes	137	11.05	▼4.8
Majority		16	1.29	
Turnout				
Conservative hold		Swing		

=== Elson ===
Elson
Party	Candidate	Votes	%	±%
Liberal Democrats	Susan Ballard	662	54.57	▲10.7
Conservative	Deborah Grant	273	22.5	▼21.4
UKIP	Megan Parks	218	18.0	▲18.0
Labour	Peter Batty	60	4.94	▼10.0
Majority		389	32.06	
Turnout		1,213		
Conservative hold		Swing		

=== Forton ===
Forton
Party	Candidate	Votes	%	±%
Liberal Democrats	Clive Foster-Reed	334	35.60	▲3.4
UKIP	Andrew Rice	251	26.75	▲14.7
Conservative	Philip Raffaelii	208	22.17	▲1.1
Labour	Luke Smith	145	15.45	▼19.1
Majority		83	8.84	
Turnout		938		
Liberal Democrats hold		Swing		

=== Grange ===
Grange
Party	Candidate	Votes	%	±%
Conservative	Anthony Jessop	359	48.18	▼1.5
Liberal Democrats	Eduardo Goncalves	280	37.58	▲16.6
Labour	David Smith	106	14.22	▼15.1
Majority		79	10.60	
Turnout		745		
Conservative hold		Swing		

=== Hardway ===
Hardway
Party	Candidate	Votes	%	±%
Conservative	Roger Allen	857	69.67	▲13.5
Labour	Robin Young	373	30.32	▲15.8
Majority		484	64.96	
Turnout		745		
Labour hold		Swing		

=== Lee East ===
Lee East
Party	Candidate	Votes	%	±%
Conservative	Richard Batemann	997	61.35	▼5.3
UKIP	Lavinia Seymour	362	22.27	▲22.27
Labour	James Fox	155	9.53	▼15.5
Green	Graham Smith	111	6.83	▲6.83
Majority		635	39.07	
Turnout		1,625		
Conservative hold		Swing		

=== Lee West ===
Lee West
Party	Candidate	Votes	%	±%
Conservative	Christopher Carter	1,251	67.76	▼14.6
UKIP	John Semour	373	20.20	▲20.20
Labour	Jill Whitcher	222	12.02	▼5.6
Majority		878	47.56	
Turnout		1,846		
Conservative hold		Swing		

=== Leesland ===
Leesland
Party	Candidate	Votes	%	±%
Liberal Democrats	Peter Chegwyn	590	54.12	▲4.2
Conservative	Zoe Chegwyn	367	33.66	▲4.9
Labour	Michael Madgwick	133	12.20	▲0.3
Majority		223	20.45	
Turnout		1,090		
Liberal Democrats hold		Swing		

=== Peel Common ===
Peel Common
Party	Candidate	Votes	%	±%
Conservative	Lynn Hook	689	50.08	▼13.6
UKIP	Paul Tomlinson	391	31.73	▲16.2
Labour	Martyn Davis	224	18.18	▼3.6
Majority		226	18.34	
Turnout		1,232		
Conservative hold		Swing		

=== Privett ===
Privett
Party	Candidate	Votes	%	±%
Conservative	Ingeborg Forder	725	57.08	▼6.3
UKIP	Timothy Apps	349	27.48	▲27.48
Labour	Terance Robbins	196	15.43	▼2.5
Majority		376	29.60	
Turnout		1,270		
Conservative hold		Swing		

=== Rowner and Holbrook ===
Rowner and Holbrook
Party	Candidate	Votes	%	±%
UKIP	Patrick Bergin	320	35.51	▲35.51
Conservative	Natasha Hook	317	35.18	▼6.9
Labour	Kyle Allen	264	29.30	▼0.4
Majority		3	0.33	
Turnout		901		
UKIP gain from Conservative		Swing		

=== Town ===
Town
Party	Candidate	Votes	%	±%
Labour	Jane Cully	792	59.01	▲6.0
UKIP	David Tinman	283	21.08	▼17.2
Conservative	George McAleese	267	19.89	▼18.4
Majority		509	37.92	
Turnout		1,342		
Labour hold		Swing		
