= 2014 Wolverhampton City Council election =

2014 UK local government election

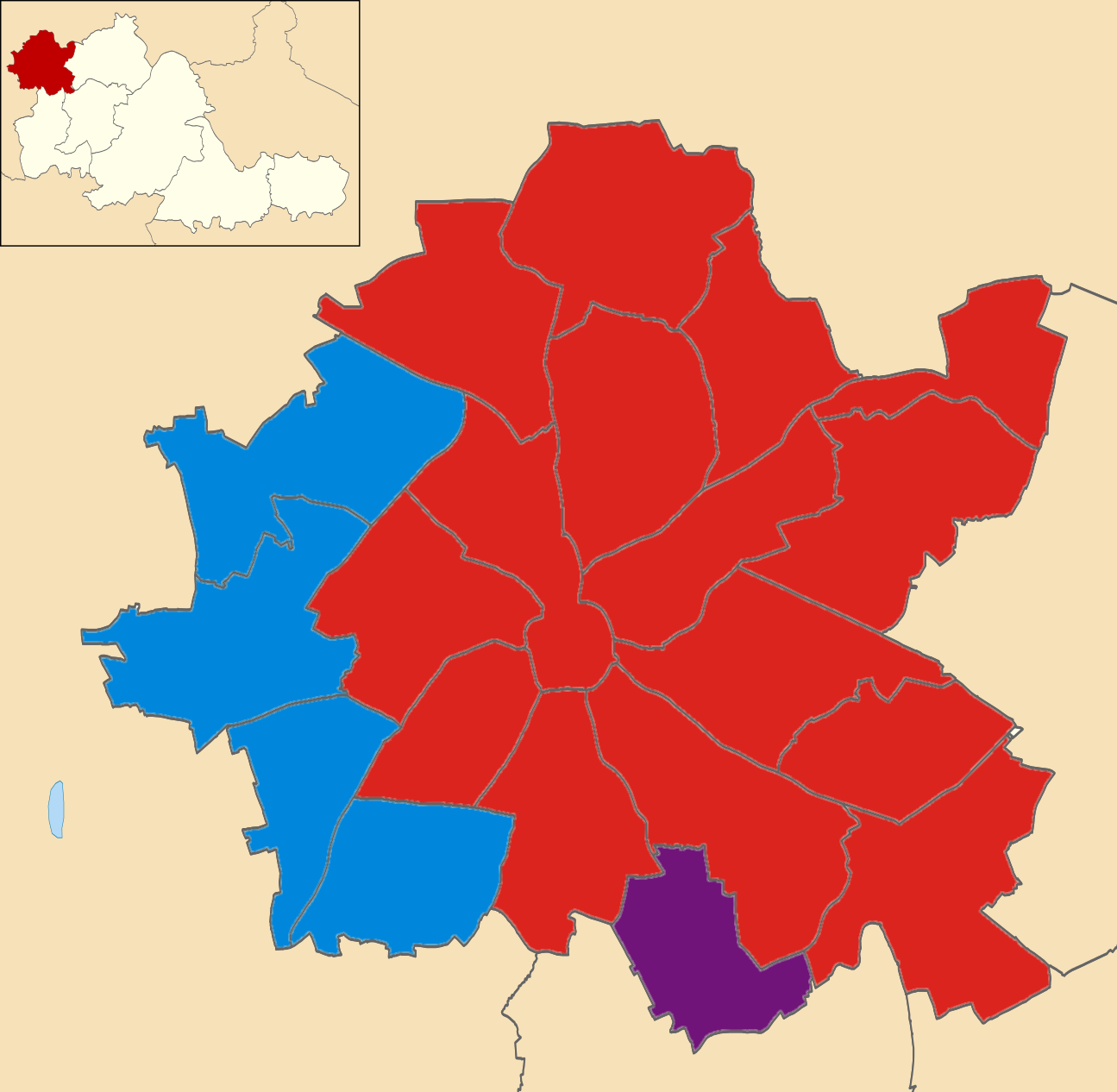
2014 local election results in Wolverhampton

The 2014 Wolverhampton City Council election took place on 22 May 2014 to elect members of Wolverhampton City Council in England. This was on the same day as other local elections.
