= 2014 Amber Valley Borough Council election =

2014 UK local government election

2014 local election results in Amber Valley

The 2014 Amber Valley Borough Council election took place on 22 May 2014 to elect members of Amber Valley Borough Council in England. This was on the same day as other local elections.

== Results summary ==
One third of the council was up for election.

Amber Valley Borough Council election results 2014
Party	Seats	Gains	Losses	Net gain/loss	Seats %	Votes %	Votes	+/−
Labour	11							
Conservative	5							
UKIP	0							
Liberal Democrats	0							
Other parties	0							

== Ward results ==
=== Alfreton ===
Alfreton (1 Seat)
Party	Candidate	Votes	%
Labour	John Walker (E)	1,113	54.6
UKIP	Stuart Bent	573	28.1
Conservative	Kat Moss	301	14.8
Liberal Democrats	Peter Jelf	49	2.4
Turnout			

=== Belper East ===
Belper East (1 Seat)
Party	Candidate	Votes	%
Conservative	Martin Tomlinson (E)	584	38.2
Labour	Alan Thomas Broughton	534	34.9
UKIP	Roy Wilford Snape	344	22.5
Liberal Democrats	Paul Smith	68	4.4
Turnout			

=== Belper South ===
Belper South (1 Seat)
Party	Candidate	Votes	%
Labour	Erik Johnsen (E)	629	37.4
Conservative	Daniel Joseph Booth	481	28.6
UKIP	David Edgar Fisher	445	26.5
Liberal Democrats	Jeremy Richard Benson	126	7.5
Turnout			

=== Codnor and Waingroves ===
Codnor and Waingroves (1 Seat)
Party	Candidate	Votes	%
Labour	Isobel Harry (E)	586	41.9
UKIP	Ann Fox	395	28.2
Conservative	Linda Edwards-Milsom	347	24.8
BNP	Alan Edwards	39	2.8
Liberal Democrats	Fay Whitehead	32	2.3
Turnout			

=== Duffield ===
Duffield (1 Seat)
Party	Candidate	Votes	%
Conservative	Chris Short (E)	930	51.2
Labour	Patrick William Mountain	424	23.4
UKIP	John William Young	298	16.4
Liberal Democrats	Richard Alan Salmon	164	9.0
Turnout			

=== Heage and Ambergate ===
Heage and Ambergate (1 Seat)
Party	Candidate	Votes	%
Labour	David Farrelly (E)	734	42.3
Conservative	Valerie Joan Taylor	561	32.3
UKIP	Julliette Nicola Stevens	371	21.4
Liberal Democrats	Chris Bradley	71	4.1
Turnout			

=== Heanor and Loscoe ===
Heanor and Loscoe (1 Seat)
Party	Candidate	Votes	%
Labour	Heather Longdon (E)	571	40.2
UKIP	Geoff Aldwinckle	487	34.3
Conservative	Julie Whitmore	319	22.5
Liberal Democrats	Ronald Welsby	43	3.0
Turnout			

=== Heanor East ===
Heanor East (1 Seat)
Party	Candidate	Votes	%
Labour	Barrie Roy Aistrop (E)	674	43.0
UKIP	Dave Patchett	440	28.1
Conservative	Steven Grainger	408	26.0
Liberal Democrats	Michael Bedford	46	2.9
Turnout			

=== Heanor West ===
Heanor West (1 Seat)
Party	Candidate	Votes	%
Labour	Paul Jones (E)	623	40.4
UKIP	Ken Clifford	501	32.5
Conservative	Mark Burrel	355	23.0
Liberal Democrats	Heather Whitworth	63	4.1
Turnout			

=== Ironville and Riddings ===
Ironville and Riddings (1 Seat)
Party	Candidate	Votes	%
Labour	Paul James Smith (E)	837	47.9
Conservative	Jack Watson Brown	557	31.9
UKIP	Pam Johnson	313	17.9
Liberal Democrats	Ollie Smith	40	2.3
Turnout			

=== Kilburn, Denby and Holbrook ===
Kilburn, Denby and Holbrook (1 Seat)
Party	Candidate	Votes	%
Conservative	Trevor Mark Ainsworth (E)	995	40.8
Labour	John Philip Banks	733	30.0
UKIP	Philip Sanders Rose	617	25.3
Liberal Democrats	Elsie Situnayake	97	4.0
Turnout			

=== Langley Mill and Aldercar ===
Langley Mill and Aldercar (1 Seat)
Party	Candidate	Votes	%
Labour	Eileen Hamilton (E)	529	43.6
UKIP	Kenneth William Chapman	366	30.2
Conservative	Stephen Peter Whitmore	289	23.8
Liberal Democrats	Margaret Tomkins	30	2.5
Turnout			

=== Ripley ===
Ripley (1 Seat)
Party	Candidate	Votes	%
Labour	Roland Emmas-Williams (E)	951	37.8
Conservative	Ron Ashton	783	31.1
UKIP	Gary Alan Smith	612	24.3
BNP	Ken Cooper	80	3.2
Liberal Democrats	Paul Robin Gibbons	70	2.8
Turnout			

=== Shipley Park, Horsley and Horsley Woodhouse ===
Shipley Park, Horsley and Horsley Woodhouse (1 Seat)
Party	Candidate	Votes	%
Conservative	Richard Henry Iliffe (E)	795	40.8
UKIP	Adrian William Nathan	525	28.2
Labour	Steve Holden	444	23.8
Liberal Democrats	Kate Smith	95	5.1
Turnout			

=== Somercotes ===
Somercotes (1 Seat)
Party	Candidate	Votes	%
Labour	Brian John Lyttle (E)	805	56.9
UKIP	Andrew Paul Maslin	348	24.6
Conservative	Ian Stewart Smith	214	15.1
Liberal Democrats	Rosemary Milward	47	3.3
Turnout			

=== Swanwick ===
(Election had been delayed until Thursday 26 June 2014)

Swanwick (1 Seat)
Party	Candidate	Votes	%
Conservative	David Wilson (E)	474	36.4
Labour	Antony Thomas Tester	298	22.9
Independent	George Soudah	252	19.4
UKIP	Allen Frederick King	245	18.8
Liberal Democrats	Joel Ross Hunt	32	2.5
Turnout			
