= 2014 Elmbridge Borough Council election =

2014 UK local government election

Results of the 2014 Elmbridge Borough Council election

Elections to Elmbridge Borough Council to elect one third of its council were held on 22 May 2014, the date of the 2014 United Kingdom local elections.

== Results summary ==
One seat changed hands: a Conservative candidate won a Molesey Residents' Association councillor's seat. The Conservative group thus slightly extended their overall majority which was gained after three years of No Overall Control in the 2008 local election. That administration succeeded a Walton Society/Residents' Association coalition who therefore grouped themselves under the Independent header which governed the borough from 2002 until 2005. The Liberal Democrats who form the other group on the council held their two seats up for re-election in this electoral year. As with all parties other than the Conservatives they did not field a candidate in every ward.

== Ward results ==
Claygate
Party	Candidate	Votes	%	±%
UKIP	Bernard Collignon	239	10	−2
Liberal Democrats	Mary Marshall	1276	51	−1
Conservative	Mark Sugden	956	38	+3
Majority		320	13	−3
Turnout		2491	46	+8
Liberal Democrats hold		Swing	-3	

Cobham and Downside
Party	Candidate	Votes	%	±%
Conservative	Margaret Mitchell	1072	60	
Liberal Democrats	Michael Smith	148	8	
Labour	Irene Threlkeld	174	10	
UKIP	Nicholas Wood	380	21	
Majority		692	39	
Turnout		1785	36	
Conservative hold		Swing		

Cobham Fairmile
Party	Candidate	Votes	%	±%
UKIP	Richard Atkins	197	21	
Liberal Democrats	David Bellchamber	101	11	
Labour	Hugh Bryant	78	8	
Conservative	Tim Grey	466	49	
Independent	Maria Odone	98	10	
Majority		269	29	
Turnout		943	30	
Conservative hold		Swing		

Esher
Party	Candidate	Votes	%	±%
Esher Residents' Association	David Bassett	907	49	
Conservative	Simon Waugh	941	51	
Majority		34	2	
Turnout		1858	37	
Conservative hold		Swing		

Hersham North
Party	Candidate	Votes	%	±%
Monster Raving Loony	Crazy Dave	43	3	
UKIP	Peter Field	357	22	
Labour	Irene Hamilton	399	25	
Conservative	Mary Sheldon	800	50	
Majority		401	25	
Turnout		1599	34	
Conservative hold		Swing		

Hersham South
Party	Candidate	Votes	%	±%
Labour	Mark Gower	342	19	
Conservative	Ruth Mitchell	1257	68	
Liberal Democrats	Andrew Sturgis	239	13	
Majority		915	50	
Turnout		1838	38	
Conservative hold		Swing		

Hinchley Wood
Party	Candidate	Votes	%	±%
UKIP	Sandra Field	138	9	
Hinchley Wood Residents' Association	Nigel Haig-Brown	1137	72	
Conservative	Xingang Wang	298	19	
Majority		999	64	
Turnout		1573	41	
Residents hold		Swing		

Long Ditton
Party	Candidate	Votes	%	±%
UKIP	Susannah Cunningham	259	12	
Conservative	Martin Fox	602	28	
Labour	Roger Hughes	158	7	
Liberal Democrats	Shweta Kapadia	1105	52	
Majority		503	24	
Turnout		2124	46	
Liberal Democrats hold		Swing		

Molesey East
Party	Candidate	Votes	%	±%
Conservative	Steve Bax	953	45	
Labour	Mark Doran	121	6	
UKIP	Trevor Marshall	125	6	
Liberal Democrats	Paul Nagle	71	3	
Molesey Residents' Association	(defeated Cllr.) Tony Popham	835	40	
Majority		118	6	
Turnout		2105	43	
Conservative gain from Residents		Swing		

Molesey North
Party	Candidate	Votes	%	±%
Labour	Ray Kelly	111	6	
Monster Raving Loony	Monkey the Drummer	22	1	
Molesey Residents' Association	Stuart Selleck	1105	58	
Liberal Democrats	Alastair Sturgis	70	4	
Conservative	Grahame Throm-Jones	364	19	
UKIP	Paul Wheatley	247	13	
Majority		741	39	
Turnout		1919	41	
Residents hold		Swing		

Molesey South
Party	Candidate	Votes	%	±%
Molesey Residents' Association	Ruby Ahmed	1157	66	
Labour	Jamal Ajjane	256	15	
Conservative	Christian Mahne	349	20	
Majority		808	46	
Turnout		1762	35	
Residents hold		Swing		

Oatlands Park
Party	Candidate	Votes	%	±%
Conservative	Lewis Brown	1266	74	
Labour	Martin Lister	227	13	
Liberal Democrats	John Smith	213	12	
Majority		1039	61	
Turnout		1706	36	
Conservative hold		Swing		

Oxshott & Stoke D'Abernon
Party	Candidate	Votes	%	±%
Labour	Mark Gower	342	19	
Conservative	Ruth Mitchell	1257	68	
Liberal Democrats	Andrew Sturgis	239	13	
Majority		915	50	
Turnout		1838	37	
Conservative hold		Swing		

St George's Hill
Party	Candidate	Votes	%	±%
Conservative	Simon Foale	811	47	
St George's Hill Independents	Kelvin MacKenzie	770	45	
Labour	Thomas Wicks	127	7	
Majority		41	2	
Turnout		1708	37	
Conservative hold		Swing		

Thames Ditton
Party	Candidate	Votes	%	±%
Thames Ditton and Weston Green Residents' Association	Tricia Bland	1339	69	
Labour	Francis Eldergill	180	9	
Conservative	Hugh Evans	297	15	
UKIP	Samantha Fry	138	7	
Majority		1042	53	
Turnout		1954	42	
Residents hold		Swing		

Walton Ambleside
Party	Candidate	Votes	%	±%
Labour	Peter Hawkes	234	22	
UKIP	David Ions	239	22	
Conservative	Andrew Kelly	603	56	
Majority		364	34	
Turnout		1076	34	
Conservative hold		Swing		

Walton Central
Party	Candidate	Votes	%	±%
Conservative	Malcolm Howard	731	36	
UKIP	David Humphreys	214	11	
The Walton Society	Alan Palmer	939	46	
Labour	Graham Smith	150	7	
Majority		208	10	
Turnout		2034	39	
The Walton Society hold		Swing		

Walton North
Party	Candidate	Votes	%	±%
Monster Raving Loony	Badger	71	3	
UKIP	Peter Jepsom	337	22	
Conservative	Rachael Lake	734	50	
Labour	Anita Wooldridge	397	25	
Majority		337	22	
Turnout		1539	31	
Conservative hold		Swing		

Weybridge South
Party	Candidate	Votes	%	±%
Liberal Democrats	Susann Bohane	231	20	
UKIP	Redvers Cunningham	178	15	
Labour	Elinor Jones	102	9	
Conservative	Richard Knight	646	56	
Majority		415	36	
Turnout		1157	35	
Conservative hold		Swing		
