= 2014 Redditch Borough Council election =

2014 UK local government election

Map of the results

The Redditch Borough Council elections of 2014 were held on Thursday 22 May 2014, on the same day as the European elections. One third of the Borough was up for re-election.

== Election results ==
Redditch local election result 2014
Party	Seats	Gains	Losses	Net gain/loss	Seats %	Votes %	Votes	+/−
Labour	17	2	0	+2	60.7%	35.83%	7,176	
Conservative	9	0	4	-4	32.1%	29.96%	6,000	
UKIP	2	2	0	+2	0%	21.04%	4,215	
Green	0	0	0	0	7.1%	6.52%	1,306	
Independent	0	0	0	0	0%	3.96%	794	
Liberal Democrats	0	0	0	0	0%	2.65%	531	
Patriotic Socialist Party	0	0	0	0	0%	0.03%	7	

== Results by Ward ==
=== Abbey ===
Abbey Ward
Party	Candidate	Votes	%	±%
Labour	Rachael Smith	642	36.85%	
UKIP	Scott Preston	510	29.27%	
Conservative	Kath Banks	505	28.98%	
Green	Fiona Whittaker	85	4.87%	
Majority		132		
Turnout		1,742	%	
Labour gain from Conservative		Swing		

=== Astwood Bank & Feckenham ===
Astwood Bank & Feckenham Ward
Party	Candidate	Votes	%	±%
Conservative	Jane Potter	827		
UKIP	Leonard Harris	532		
Labour	Dr. Gilly Cooper	486		
Green	Rosemary Kerry	95		
Majority		292		
Turnout		1,940	%	
Conservative hold		Swing		

=== Batchley & Brockhill ===
Batchley & Brockhill Ward
Party	Candidate	Votes	%	±%
Labour	Natalie Brookes	747		
Labour	John Witherspoon	718		
Conservative	Maureen Hudson	487		
Conservative	Brenda Quinney	484		
Independent	Jim Uphill	305		
Independent	Adrian Cullum	235		
Green	Steve Pound	155		
Green	Simon Venables	145		
Independent	Richard Armstrong	94		
Majority		260		
Majority		234		
Turnout		1,685	%	
Labour gain from Conservative		Swing		
Labour hold		Swing		

=== Central ===
Central Ward
Party	Candidate	Votes	%	±%
Labour	Debbie Taylor	815		
Conservative	Matt Dormer	454		
Independent	Isabel Armstrong	120		
Green	Yvonne Rhodes	112		
Liberal Democrats	Diane Thomas	75		
Majority		361		
Turnout		1,576	%	
Labour hold		Swing		

=== Church Hill ===
Church Hill Ward
Party	Candidate	Votes	%	±%
UKIP	Dave Small	665		
Labour	Nina Wood-Ford	615		
Conservative	Kathy Haslam	433		
Green	Lee Bradley	80		
Liberal Democrats	David Gee	79		
Independent	Maxine Shotbolt	26		
Independent	Agnieszka Wiecek	14		
Majority		60		
Turnout		1,902	%	
UKIP gain from Conservative		Swing		

=== Crabbs Cross ===
Crabbs Cross Ward
Party	Candidate	Votes	%	±%
Conservative	David Thain	669		
UKIP	Chris Harrison	554		
Labour	Monica Fry	327		
Green	Louise Deveney	128		
Majority		115		
Turnout		1,678	%	
Conservative hold		Swing		

=== Greenlands ===
Greenlands Ward
Party	Candidate	Votes	%	±%
Labour	Wanda King	883		
Conservative	Tom Baker-Price	525		
Green	Rylma White	254		
Liberal Democrats	Anthony Pitt	117		
Majority		358		
Turnout		1,779	%	
Labour hold		Swing		

=== Headless Cross & Oakenshaw ===
Headless Cross & Oakenshaw Ward
Party	Candidate	Votes	%	±%
Conservative	Gay Hopkins	805		
UKIP	Peter Bridle	743		
Labour	Chris Mowatt	732		
Green	Alistair Waugh	109		
Liberal Democrats	Rita Hindle	84		
Majority		62		
Turnout		2,473	%	
Conservative hold		Swing		

=== Lodge Park ===
Lodge Park Ward
Party	Candidate	Votes	%	±%
Labour	Andrew Fry	582		
UKIP	Paul White	377		
Conservative	Antonia Pulsford	206		
Liberal Democrats	Ian Webster	50		
Green	Kevin White	47		
Patriotic Socialist Party	Chris Griffiths	7		
Majority		205		
Turnout		1,269	%	
Labour hold		Swing		

=== Winyates ===
Winyates Ward
Party	Candidate	Votes	%	±%
UKIP	Paul Swansborough	834		
Labour	Clive Cheetham	629		
Conservative	Gareth Prosser	605		
Liberal Democrats	Simon Oliver	126		
Green	Emma Bradley	96		
Majority		205		
Turnout		2,290	%	
UKIP gain from Conservative		Swing		
