= 2012 Rugby Borough Council election =

2012 UK local government election

Map of the results

Elections to Rugby Borough Council took place on Thursday 3 May 2012.

All 42 seats were up for election. This is because a boundary review took place and reduced the size of the council and adjusted the ward boundaries. The Conservative Party retained their majority.

== New wards ==
- Admirals & Cawston Ward (3 councillors)
- Benn Ward (3 councillors)
- Bilton Ward (3 councillors)
- Clifton, Newton and Churchover Ward (1 councillor)
- Coton and Boughton Ward (3 councillors)
- Dunsmore Ward (3 councillors)
- Eastlands Ward (3 councillors)
- Hillmorton Ward (3 councillors)
- Leam Valley Ward (1 councillor)
- New Bilton Ward (3 councillors)
- Newbold and Brownsover Ward (3 councillors)
- Paddox Ward (3 councillors)
- Revel and Binley Woods Ward (3 councillors)
- Rokeby and Overslade Ward (3 councillors)
- Wolston and the Lawfords Ward (3 councillors)
- Wolvey and Shilton Ward (1 councillor)

== Election results ==
Rugby Borough Council election, 2012
Party	Seats	Gains	Losses	Net gain/loss	Seats %	Votes %	Votes	+/−
Conservative	25							
Labour	10							
Liberal Democrats	6							
Independent	1							
Green	0							
TUSC	0							

== Ward results ==
Note: Because of the boundary changes and the lack of any nominal results under the new boundaries, all results are listed as holds, even when seats have de facto changed hands. Percentage results are only shown for single-seat wards.

Admirals and Cawston Ward
Party	Candidate	Votes	%	±%
Conservative	Peter James Butlin	709		
Conservative	Michael Thomas Stokes	691		
Conservative	Mark Antony Williams	685		
Labour	Steve Birkett	641		
Labour	Marie Angela McNally	617		
Labour	Alan Charles Webb	571		
Green	Kate Crowley	179		
Liberal Democrats	Hilda Esme Fletcher	102		
Liberal Democrats	Richard John Allanach	100		
Liberal Democrats	Tom Hardgrave	91		
Majority				
Turnout			30.16%	
Conservative hold		Swing		
Conservative hold		Swing		
Conservative hold		Swing		

Benn Ward
Party	Candidate	Votes	%	±%
Labour	Maggie O'Rourke	824		
Labour	Tom Mahoney	820		
Labour	James Masih Shera	819		
Conservative	Lorna Lyttle	258		
Conservative	Nicola Williams	256		
Conservative	Ian James Picker	255		
Green	Steven Michael Wright	252		
Liberal Democrats	Ted Pallot	180		
TUSC	Bert Harris	177		
Liberal Democrats	Claire Louise Sandison	175		
Majority				
Turnout			26.53%	
Labour hold		Swing		
Labour hold		Swing		
Labour hold		Swing		

Bilton Ward
Party	Candidate	Votes	%	±%
Conservative	Craig Humphrey	1134		
Conservative	Lisa Anne Parker	1004		
Conservative	David Alan Wright	698		
Labour	Stephanie Jones	643		
Liberal Democrats	Lesley Mary Kennedy-George	397		
Liberal Democrats	Chris Holman	373		
TUSC	Stephen James Roberts	229		
Majority				
Turnout			38.77%	
Conservative hold		Swing		
Conservative hold		Swing		
Conservative hold		Swing		

Clifton, Newton and Churchover Ward
Party	Candidate	Votes	%	±%
Conservative	Leigh Simone Hunt	332	65.48%	
Labour	Steve Weston	175	34.52%	
Majority		157	30.97%	
Turnout			34.59%	
Conservative hold		Swing		

Coton and Boughton Ward
Party	Candidate	Votes	%	±%
Conservative	Carolyn Ann Robbins	647		
Conservative	Helen Barbara Walton	535		
Conservative	David Dick Cranham	512		
Labour	Mary Jean Webb	484		
Green	Adam William Bastock	287		
Majority				
Turnout			23.62%	
Conservative hold		Swing		
Conservative hold		Swing		
Conservative hold		Swing		

Dunsmore Ward
Party	Candidate	Votes	%	±%
Independent	Howard David Roberts	1281		
Conservative	Graham Lawrence Francis	1058		
Conservative	Ian Stanley Lowe	1033		
Conservative	Ian Spires	868		
Labour	Doreen Cox	460		
Liberal Democrats	Suzanne Louise Davies	324		
Liberal Democrats	Beatrice Josephine O'Dwyer	304		
Majority				
Turnout			39.48%	
Independent hold		Swing		
Conservative hold		Swing		
Conservative hold		Swing		

Eastlands Ward
Party	Candidate	Votes	%	±%
Liberal Democrats	Sue Roodhouse	810		
Liberal Democrats	Neil James Sandison	722		
Liberal Democrats	Dale Keeling	567		
Labour	Owen Keir Richards	497		
Conservative	Scott Oliver Whyment	340		
Conservative	Ian Graham Francis	326		
Green	Phil Godden	306		
Conservative	Paul Michael Samuel Newsom	300		
TUSC	Robert Johnson	223		
Majority				
Turnout			27.92%	
Liberal Democrats hold		Swing		
Liberal Democrats hold		Swing		
Liberal Democrats hold		Swing		

Hillmorton Ward
Party	Candidate	Votes	%	±%
Conservative	Bill Sewell	804		
Conservative	Kathryn Margaret Lawrence	706		
Conservative	Nigel David Allen	662		
Labour	Kieren Brown	534		
Labour	Maria Arungwa	451		
Labour	John Anthony Slinger	427		
Liberal Democrats	Jess Upstone	334		
Liberal Democrats	Dave Elson	255		
Liberal Democrats	Tim Douglas	207		
TUSC	David John Goodwin	119		
Majority				
Turnout			38.90%	
Conservative hold		Swing		
Conservative hold		Swing		
Conservative hold		Swing		

Leam Valley Ward
Party	Candidate	Votes	%	±%
Conservative	Robin Hazelton	Unopposed		
Majority				
Turnout				
Conservative hold		Swing		

New Bilton Ward
Party	Candidate	Votes	%	±%
Labour	Ish Mistry	709		
Labour	Tina Avis	683		
Labour	Rob McNally	630		
Conservative	Chris Cade	406		
Conservative	Emma Harrington	390		
Conservative	Charlie Hull	334		
Green	Roy Leonard Sandison	241		
Green	Peter Stephen Reynolds	195		
TUSC	Ally MacGregor	141		
Majority				
Turnout			25.52%	
Labour hold		Swing		
Labour hold		Swing		
Labour hold		Swing		

Newbold and Brownsover Ward
Party	Candidate	Votes	%	±%
Labour	Andy Coles	649		
Labour	Claire Edwards	628		
Labour	Ram Srivastava	576		
Conservative	Martin Walton	467		
Conservative	Rachel Elizabeth Watts	465		
Conservative	Yousef Dahmash	415		
Green	Lorna Beryl Dunleavy	173		
TUSC	Bill Smith	145		
Green	James Bryans	115		
Majority				
Turnout			25.53%	
Labour hold		Swing		
Labour hold		Swing		
Labour hold		Swing		

Paddox Ward
Party	Candidate	Votes	%	±%
Liberal Democrats	Richard James Dodd	1231		
Liberal Democrats	Jerry Roodhouse	1164		
Liberal Democrats	Noreen Coral Marion New	1077		
Labour	Nigel Edward Stanley	480		
Conservative	Stephen Anthony Tompsett	396		
Conservative	Hash Mistry	340		
Conservative	Marc James Pooler	299		
Green	David Wolfskehl	280		
Majority				
Turnout			37.69%	
Liberal Democrats hold		Swing		
Liberal Democrats hold		Swing		
Liberal Democrats hold		Swing		

Revel and Binley Woods Ward
Party	Candidate	Votes	%	±%
Conservative	Tony Gillias	1211		
Conservative	Heather Mary Timms	1132		
Conservative	Belinda Garcia	972		
Labour	Jo Watson	700		
Majority				
Turnout			35.51%	
Conservative hold		Swing		
Conservative hold		Swing		
Conservative hold		Swing		

Rokeby and Overslade Ward
Party	Candidate	Votes	%	±%
Labour	Howard Mark Avis	615		
Conservative	Matthew David Francis	613		
Conservative	Kam Kaur	612		
Labour	Emma Daynes	564		
Conservative	Teri Watts	557		
Liberal Democrats	Bill Lewis	504		
Labour	John Francis Wells	496		
Liberal Democrats	Gwen Hotten	491		
Liberal Democrats	Dave Merritt	372		
Green	Laurence Stephen Goodchild	205		
TUSC	Julie Weekes	125		
Majority				
Turnout			37.49%	
Labour hold		Swing		
Conservative hold		Swing		
Conservative hold		Swing		

Wolston and the Lawfords Ward
Party	Candidate	Votes	%	±%
Conservative	Sally Drayton Bragg	939		
Conservative	Derek Poole	894		
Conservative	Claire Watson	833		
Labour	Paul Castle	489		
Green	Ellie Roderick	361		
Independent	Pat Wyatt	324		
TUSC	Pete McLaren	289		
Majority				
Turnout			33.76%	
Conservative hold		Swing		
Conservative hold		Swing		
Conservative hold		Swing		

Wolvey and Shilton Ward
Party	Candidate	Votes	%	±%
Conservative	Chris Pacey-Day	465	67.39%	
Labour	Robert Charles Bevin	225	32.61%	
Majority		240	34.78%	
Turnout		690	36.18%	
Conservative hold		Swing		
