= Ravenscourt Park (ward) =

Coordinates: 51.495°N 0.240°W

- Former electoral ward for the Hammersmith and Fulham London Borough Council
- Ravenscourt Park ward boundaries
- Borough: Hammersmith and Fulham
- County: Greater London
- Population: 10,785 (2011)
- Electorate: 7,942 (2018)

Former electoral ward
- Created: 2002
- Abolished: 2022
- Councillors: 3
- Replaced by: Grove, Ravenscourt, Wendell Park
- GSS code: E05000261

Ravenscourt Park was an electoral ward of the London Borough of Hammersmith and Fulham from 2002 to 2022. It was first used in the 2002 elections and last used for the 2018 elections. It returned three councillors to Hammersmith and Fulham London Borough Council.

At the 2011 Census the population of the ward was 10,785.

== List of councillors ==
Term	Councillor	Party
2002–2006	Christopher Allen	Labour
2002–2005	Caroline Donald	Conservative
2002–2006	Fiona Evans-Lothian	Labour
2005–2018	Lucy Ivimy	Conservative
2006–2018	Harry Phibbs	Conservative
2006–2010	Eugenie White	Conservative
2010–2018	Charlie Dewhirst	Conservative
2018–2022	Jonathan Caleb-Landy	Labour
2018–2022	Bora Kwon	Labour
2018–2022	Asif Siddique	Labour

== Hammersmith and Fulham council elections ==
=== 2018 election ===
The election took place on 3 May 2018.

2018 Hammersmith and Fulham London Borough Council election: Ravenscourt Park (3)
Party	Candidate	Votes	%	±%
Labour	Jonathan Caleb-Landy	1,834	45.9	+6.1
Labour	Bora Kwon	1,768	44.2	+8.7
Labour	Asif Siddique	1,752	43.8	+8.8
Conservative	Harry Phibbs	1,405	35.1	−7.9
Conservative	Lucy Ivimy	1,351	33.8	−12.3
Conservative	Mark Higton	1,281	32.0	−11.4
Liberal Democrats	Henrietta Bewley	815	20.4	+11.8
Liberal Democrats	Irina Von Wiese	744	18.6	+12.5
Liberal Democrats	Alison Hancock	741	18.5	+12.5
Majority		347	8.7	
Turnout			50.44%	+1.1%
Labour gain from Conservative		Swing		
Labour gain from Conservative		Swing		
Labour gain from Conservative		Swing		

=== 2014 election ===
The election took place on 22 May 2014.

2014 Hammersmith and Fulham London Borough Council election: Ravenscourt Park (3)
Party	Candidate	Votes	%	±%
Conservative	Lucy Ivimy	1,724	46.1	
Conservative	Charlie Dewhirst	1,621	43.4	
Conservative	Harry Phibbs	1,608	43.0	
Labour	Jasmine Pilgrem	1489	39.8	
Labour	Alexandra Sanderson	1329	35.5	
Labour	Rowan Ree	1310	35.0	
Green	David Akan	523	14.0	
Liberal Democrats	Simon Bailey	322	8.6	
Liberal Democrats	Ian Harris	228	6.1	
Liberal Democrats	Thomas Miller	224	6.0	
UKIP	Jim Wainwright	192	5.1	
Majority		119	3.2	
Turnout			49.30%	
Conservative hold		Swing		
Conservative hold		Swing		
Conservative hold		Swing		

=== 2010 election ===
The election on 6 May 2010 took place on the same day as the United Kingdom general election.

2010 Hammersmith and Fulham London Borough Council election: Ravenscourt Park (3)
Party	Candidate	Votes	%	±%
Conservative	Lucy Ivimy	2,300	42.6%	
Conservative	Charlie Dewhirst	2,143		
Conservative	Harry Phibbs	2,107		
Labour	Olivia Bailey	1855	34.3%	
Labour	Nic Cobb	1609		
Labour	Felicity Dennistoun	1500		
Liberal Democrats	Michael Cook	1247	23.1%	
Liberal Democrats	Callum Goldstein	1151		
Liberal Democrats	Margaret Goldstein	1128		
Turnout				
Conservative hold		Swing		
Conservative hold		Swing		
Conservative hold		Swing		

=== 2006 election ===
The election took place on 4 May 2006.

2006 Hammersmith and Fulham London Borough Council election: Ravenscourt Park (3)
Party	Candidate	Votes	%	±%
Conservative	Lucy Ivimy	1,815	50.3	
Conservative	Harry Phibbs	1,725		
Conservative	Eugenie White	1,725		
Labour	Christopher Allen	1227	34.0	
Labour	Julian Hillman	1164		
Labour	Tony McMahon	1131		
Liberal Democrats	Margaret Goldstein	563	15.6	
Liberal Democrats	Lillian Eckersley	514		
Liberal Democrats	Ian Harris	499		
Turnout			48.8	
Conservative gain from Labour		Swing		
Conservative hold		Swing		
Conservative gain from Labour		Swing		

=== 2005 by-election ===
The by-election took place on 28 July 2005, following the death of Caroline Donald.

2005 Ravenscourt Park by-election
Party	Candidate	Votes	%	±%
Conservative	Lucy Ivimy	1,069		
Labour	Tony McMahon	757		
Liberal Democrats	Samuel Le Rougetel	585		
Turnout				
Conservative hold		Swing		

=== 2002 election ===
The election took place on 2 May 2002.

2002 Hammersmith and Fulham London Borough Council election: Ravenscourt Park (3)
Party	Candidate	Votes	%	±%
Labour	Christopher Allen	1,177	37.4%	
Conservative	Caroline Donald	1,131	36.0%	
Labour	Fiona Evans-Lothian	1,128		
Conservative	Huw Merriman	1107		
Labour	Gregory Jackson	1102		
Conservative	Joseph Miles	1087		
Liberal Democrats	Margaret Goldstein	838	26.6%	
Liberal Democrats	Jon Burden	832		
Liberal Democrats	Katharine Poll	828		
Turnout				
Labour win (new seat)				
Conservative win (new seat)				
Labour win (new seat)				
