= 2006 Hammersmith and Fulham London Borough Council election =

2006 local election in England

- 4 May 2006

All 46 seats to Hammersmith and Fulham London Borough Council 24 seats needed for a majority
- Turnout: 39.7% (▲7.7%)
	First party	Second party
Party	Conservative	Labour
Last election	18 seats, 41.7%	28 seats, 41.5%
Seats before	17	29
Seats won	33	13
Seat change	▲15	▼15
Popular vote	22,862	15,275
Percentage	48.2%	32.2%
Swing	▲6.5%	▼9.3%
- Map of the results of the 2006 Hammersmith and Fulham council election. Conservatives in blue and Labour in red.
Council control before election
Labour
Council control after election
Conservative

A map showing the wards of Hammersmith and Fulham since 2002

Elections to Hammersmith and Fulham Council were held on 4 May 2006. The whole council was up for election for the first time since the 2002 election.

== Election result ==
Hammersmith and Fulham local election result 2006
Party	Seats	Gains	Losses	Net gain/loss	Seats %	Votes %	Votes	+/−
Conservative	33	15	0	+15	72	48.7		+6.2%
Labour	13	0	15	-15	28	32.0		-9.0%
Liberal Democrats	0	0	0	0	0	14.0		-0.1%
Green	0	0	0	0	0			

At the Hammersmith and Fulham council election, 2006, the Conservative Party won a majority for the first time since 1968, taking 33 seats and forming the Administration for the London Borough of Hammersmith and Fulham . The Council leader was Cllr Stephen Greenhalgh. Labour formed the opposition on the Council, with 13 seats, and was led by Stephen Cowan.

The Conservative Party came close to losing the usually safe ward of Palace Riverside, after the sitting councillors were deselected, and ran as independents. One of the two rebels returned 12 years later as the Conservative candidate in the same ward, and was elected.

One notable loss for the Labour Party was one of the three seats in the Shepherds Bush Green ward – which only ever elected Labour councillors before or since. After alternating between Abu Khalad (1986, 1994 & 2002) and Jafar Khaled (1990 & 1998), Abu Khaled stood for re-election but lost by 4 votes in a ward where the Conservatives had previously been nowhere near winning a seat.

== Ward results ==
The borough is divided into 16 electoral wards, all bar two electing three councillors apiece.

=== Addison ===
Addison (3)
Party	Candidate	Votes	%	±%
Conservative	Helen Binmore	1,799	42.5	
Conservative	Belinda Donovan	1,682		
Conservative	Peter Tobias	1,664		
Labour	Siobhan Coughlan	1276	30.2	
Labour	Melanie Smallman	1238		
Labour	Andrew Ellard	1155		
Green	Dylan Clarence-Smith	597	14.1	
Liberal Democrats	Janet Burden	480	11.3	
Liberal Democrats	John Sutton	360		
CPA	Katherine Mills	80	1.9	
Turnout			45.0	
Conservative gain from Labour		Swing		
Conservative gain from Labour		Swing		
Conservative gain from Labour		Swing		

=== Askew ===
Askew (3)
Party	Candidate	Votes	%	±%
Labour	Gill Dickenson	1,186	39.0	
Labour	Rory Vaughan	1,086		
Labour	Lisa Homan	1,080		
Liberal Democrats	Henrietta Bewley	1052	34.6	
Liberal Democrats	Sophie Sainty	1002		
Liberal Democrats	Thoby Young	950		
Conservative	David Cann	806	26.5	
Conservative	William Oliver	769		
Conservative	Alexander Evans	760		
Turnout			36.8	
Labour hold		Swing		
Labour hold		Swing		
Labour hold		Swing		

=== Avonmore & Brook Green ===
Avonmore & Brook Green (3)
Party	Candidate	Votes	%	±%
Conservative	Alexandra Robson	1,747	55.9	
Conservative	Will Bethell*	1,717		
Conservative	Robert Iggulden	1,669		
Labour	Mujeer Khan	931	29.8	
Labour	Victoria Woodhatch	847		
Labour	Simon Risley	841		
Liberal Democrats	Thomas Cottam	447	14.3	
Liberal Democrats	Nicola Crawley	438		
Liberal Democrats	Adrian Whyatt	389		
Turnout			38.0	
Conservative hold		Swing		
Conservative hold		Swing		
Conservative hold		Swing		

=== College Park & Old Oak ===
College Park & Old Oak (2)
Party	Candidate	Votes	%	±%
Labour	Wesley Harcourt*	686	45.4	
Labour	Reg McLaughlin*	610		
Conservative	Alexandra de Lisle	308	20.4	
Liberal Democrats	Jon Burden	287	19.0	
Conservative	Gerald Spencer-Smith	252		
Independent	Stephen Brennan	231	15.3	
Liberal Democrats	Carsten Freisberg	231		
Turnout			31.5	
Labour hold		Swing		
Labour hold		Swing		

=== Fulham Broadway ===
Fulham Broadway (3)
Party	Candidate	Votes	%	±%
Conservative	Aidan Burley	1,682	49.3	
Conservative	Victoria Brocklebank-Fowler	1,644		
Conservative	Rachel Ford	1,610		
Labour	Andrew Jones	1191	34.9	
Labour	Charles Napier	1146		
Labour	Anthony Stephens	1111		
Liberal Democrats	Shaun Carr	305	8.9	
BNP	Stephen Tyler	236	6.9	
Liberal Democrats	Robert Falkner	235		
Liberal Democrats	Rowland Mynors	210		
Turnout			44.3	
Conservative gain from Labour		Swing		
Conservative gain from Labour		Swing		
Conservative gain from Labour		Swing		

=== Fulham Reach ===
Fulham Reach (3)
Party	Candidate	Votes	%	±%
Conservative	Gavin Donovan*	1,683	49.9	
Conservative	Paul Bristow	1,635		
Conservative	Andrew Johnson	1,573		
Labour	Stephen Burke	1284	38.1	
Labour	Oliver Cardigan	1222		
Labour	Matthew Turmaine	1207		
Liberal Democrats	Elizabeth Stephens	407	12.1	
Liberal Democrats	Marytka Jablkowska	341		
Turnout			44.1	
Conservative hold		Swing		
Conservative gain from Labour		Swing		
Conservative hold		Swing		

=== Hammersmith Broadway ===
Hammersmith Broadway (3)
Party	Candidate	Votes	%	±%
Labour	Michael Cartwright*	1,203	42.9	
Labour	Lisa Nandy	1,203		
Labour	Stephen Cowan*	1,161		
Conservative	Edward Clarke	1152	41.1	
Conservative	Elizabeth St Clair-Legge	1042		
Conservative	Oliver Craig	1038		
Liberal Democrats	Andrew Young	448	16.0	
Liberal Democrats	Samuel Le Rougetel	447		
Liberal Democrats	Meher Oliaji	366		
Turnout			36.8	
Labour hold		Swing		
Labour hold		Swing		
Labour hold		Swing		

=== Munster ===
Munster (3)
Party	Candidate	Votes	%	±%
Conservative	Michael Adam*	1,825	67.7	
Conservative	Adronie Alford*	1,762		
Conservative	Alex Karmel*	1,736		
Labour	Thomas Butler	508	18.9	
Labour	Joseph Moriah	454		
Labour	Simon Stanley	445		
Liberal Democrats	Sarah Carr	361	13.4	
Liberal Democrats	Alastair Brett	314		
Liberal Democrats	Stephen Morris	273		
Turnout			35.2	
Conservative hold		Swing		
Conservative hold		Swing		
Conservative hold		Swing		

=== North End ===
North End (3)
Party	Candidate	Votes	%	±%
Conservative	Caroline Ffiske	1,585	49.1	
Conservative	Sarah Gore	1,521		
Conservative	Lucy Gugen	1,492		
Labour	Iain Coleman	1295	40.1	
Labour	Daryl Brown	1250		
Labour	Charles Treloggan	1158		
Liberal Democrats	Suzanna Harris	349	10.8	
Liberal Democrats	Kishwer Falkner	337		
Liberal Democrats	Paul Ratcliffe	278		
Turnout			42.1	
Conservative gain from Labour		Swing		
Conservative gain from Labour		Swing		
Conservative gain from Labour		Swing		

=== Palace Riverside ===
Palace Riverside (2)
Party	Candidate	Votes	%	±%
Conservative	Donald Johnson	1,239	45.3	
Conservative	Melanie Scott Russell	1,183		
Independent	Emile Al-Uzaizi	1056	38.6	
Independent	Amanda Lloyd-Harris	1038		
Labour	Francis Lukey	278	10.2	
Labour	Barrington Stead	243		
Liberal Democrats	Hector Macdonald	163	6.0	
Liberal Democrats	Tamara Dragadze	152		
Turnout			50.5	
Conservative hold		Swing		
Conservative hold		Swing		

=== Parson's Green & Walham ===
Parson's Green & Walham (3)
Party	Candidate	Votes	%	±%
Conservative	Nicholas Botterill*	2,307	74.9	
Conservative	Frances Stainton*	2,307		
Conservative	Mark Loveday*	2,274		
Labour	Robin Homan	426	13.8	
Labour	Jenny Vaughan	402		
Labour	Colin Pavelin	392		
Liberal Democrats	Alice Meek	348	11.3	
Liberal Democrats	William Bagwell	337		
Liberal Democrats	Peter Hartwell	316		
Turnout			41.8	
Conservative hold		Swing		
Conservative hold		Swing		
Conservative hold		Swing		

=== Ravenscourt Park ===
Ravenscourt Park (3)
Party	Candidate	Votes	%	±%
Conservative	Lucy Ivimy	1,815	50.3	
Conservative	Harry Phibbs	1,725		
Conservative	Eugenie White	1,725		
Labour	Christopher Allen	1227	34.0	
Labour	Julian Hillman	1164		
Labour	Anthony McMahon	1131		
Liberal Democrats	Margaret Goldstein	563	15.6	
Liberal Democrats	Lillian Eckersley	514		
Liberal Democrats	Ian Harris	499		
Turnout			48.8	
Conservative gain from Labour		Swing		
Conservative hold		Swing		
Conservative gain from Labour		Swing		

=== Sands End ===
Sands End (3)
Party	Candidate	Votes	%	±%
Conservative	Steve Hamilton*	1,728	57.2	
Conservative	Jane Law	1,714		
Conservative	Jeanette Bentley	1,707		
Labour	Brendan Bird	1044	34.5	
Labour	Winifred Watson	869		
Labour	Mulat Haregot,	864		
Liberal Democrats	Lucia Graves	250	8.3	
Liberal Democrats	Allan McKelvie	215		
Liberal Democrats	Joan Harnett	195		
Turnout			41.1	
Conservative hold		Swing		
Conservative gain from Labour		Swing		
Conservative gain from Labour		Swing		

=== Shepherd's Bush Green ===
Shepherd's Bush Green (3)
Party	Candidate	Votes	%	±%
Labour	Ed Owen	909	38.6	
Labour	Mercy Umeh*	846		
Conservative	Alex Chalk	838	35.6	
Labour	Abu Khaled	834		
Conservative	John Goodall	735		
Conservative	Charles Dewhirst	704		
Liberal Democrats	Patricia Owen	608	25.8	
Liberal Democrats	George Collie	501		
Liberal Democrats	Jane Winn	449		
Turnout			31.2	
Labour hold		Swing		
Labour hold		Swing		
Conservative gain from Labour		Swing		

=== Town ===
Town (3)
Party	Candidate	Votes	%	±%
Conservative	Stephen Greenhalgh*	1,581	62.6	
Conservative	Greg Smith	1,570		
Conservative	Antony Lillis*	1,554		
Labour	Anthony Cash	539	21.3	
Labour	Dominic Church	462		
Labour	Krokhukoomaj Kadoo	429		
Liberal Democrats	Henry Braund	406	16.1	
Liberal Democrats	Paul Kennedy	397		
Liberal Democrats	Graham Muir	368		
Turnout			35.1	
Conservative hold		Swing		
Conservative hold		Swing		
Conservative hold		Swing		

=== Wormholt & White City ===
Wormholt & White City (3)
Party	Candidate	Votes	%	±%
Labour	Jean Campbell	1,292	48.1	
Labour	Colin Aherne*	1,278		
Labour	Sally Powell *	1,151		
Conservative	Terry Barnes	767	28.6	
Conservative	Edward Trehearne	623		
Conservative	Arunasalam Yogeswaram	519		
Liberal Democrats	Julie Perrin	442	16.5	
Liberal Democrats	Matthew Pocock	404		
Liberal Democrats	Rosemary Pettit	382		
Independent	Jagdeo Hauzaree	184	6.9	
Turnout			33.4	
Labour hold		Swing		
Labour hold		Swing		
Labour hold		Swing		
