= Nick Hillman =

English education policy adviser

Special adviser for David Willetts
- In office 2010–2013

Director of the Higher Education Policy Institute
- Incumbent
- Assumed office 2014

Personal details
- Born: April 1972 (age 54) Banbury, England
- Party: Conservatives
- Education: University of Manchester; Christ's College, Cambridge; Queen Mary University of London

Nicholas Piers Huxley Hillman OBE (born 21 April 1972 in Banbury, Oxfordshire) is an English higher education policy adviser, previously a school history teacher and special adviser for the Conservatives. He has been the director of the Higher Education Policy Institute since 2014.

== Education ==
Hillman studied as an undergraduate at the University of Manchester. He taught English at the University of Bucharest in Romania in 1992, then gained a PGCE in history at Christ's College, Cambridge before teaching history at St Paul's School, London from 1995 to 1998. He received a master's degree in contemporary British history at Queen Mary University of London.

== Career ==
Hillman worked for Conservative MP David Willetts, first as a Senior Research Officer from 2000 to 2003. Hillman stood for the Conservatives in the 2002 local elections in Hammersmith Broadway Ward, coming sixth in a three-seat election with 528 votes.

He worked on pensions policy for the Association of British Insurers from 2003 to 2007, before returning to politics. From 2007 to 2010, Hillman served as Willetts' chief of staff. He was the Conservative parliamentary candidate for Cambridge in 2010, selected from six candidates in an open primary in December 2009 after Richard Normington stepped down as candidate. A fundraising dinner was supported by Clarissa Dickson-Wright. He represented himself as a "liberal Tory", but The Independent reported he was "not getting much help from the party's big guns". Hillman came second behind the Liberal Democrat Julian Huppert with 12,829 votes.

From 2010 to 2013 he was a special adviser in the Department for Business, Innovation and Skills when Willets was Science Minister. As a special adviser Hillman helped introduce higher university tuition fees.

Since January 2014 he has been the director of a think tank, the Higher Education Policy Institute in Oxford. Since 2016 he has been on the board of governors of his alma mater, the University of Manchester, and he became a fellow of another alma mater, Queen Mary University of London, in 2016. From 2015 to 2018 he was a school governor at Haddenham St Mary's. He has been a trustee of the National Foundation for Educational Research since April 2018 and he is a member of the Higher Education Policy Development Group at the British Academy. He was previously a research fellow with Policy Exchange.

== Personal life ==
Hillman grew up in Banbury. He met his wife while they were undergraduates and they married in Cambridge. While a teacher in London he lived in Covent Garden. They have children and live in Haddenham, Buckingham.

== Works ==
- Adam Bogdanor, David Willetts MP, Nicholas Hillman, Left Out, Left Behind. Policy Exchange, 2003
- David Willetts and Nicholas Hillman, Tax Credits: Do They Add Up? Politeia, 2002
- Nicholas Hillman; Edited by Dr Oliver Marc Hartwich, Quelling the Pensions Storm: Lessons from the past, March 20, 2008
- The Guardian columnist
- Nicholas Hillman, "Public schools and the Fleming report of 1944: shunting the first-class carriage on to an immense siding?." History of Education 41#2 (2012): 235–255.
- Hillman, Nicholas (1 December 2010). "The Public Schools Commission: 'Impractical, Expensive and Harmful to Children'?". Contemporary British History. 24 (4): 511–531. doi:10.1080/13619462.2010.518413. ISSN 1361-9462. S2CID 154446106.
- Hillman, Nicholas (February 2008). "A 'chorus of execration'? Enoch Powell's 'rivers of blood' forty years on". Patterns of Prejudice. 42 (1): 83–104. doi:10.1080/00313220701805927. S2CID 143681971.
- Hillman, Nicholas (2013). "From Grants for All to Loans for All: Undergraduate Finance from the Implementation of the Anderson Report (1962) to the Implementation of the Browne Report (2012)". Contemporary British History. 27 (3): 249–270. doi:10.1080/13619462.2013.783418. S2CID 154321565.
- Hillman, Nicholas (2016). "The Coalition's higher education reforms in England". Oxford Review of Education. 42 (3): 330–345. doi:10.1080/03054985.2016.1184870.
- Hillman, Nicholas (2001). "'Tell me chum, in case I got it wrong. What was it we were fighting during the war?' The Re-emergence of British Fascism, 1945-58". Contemporary British History. 15 (4): 1–34. doi:10.1080/713999428. S2CID 143994809.
