= Matt Turmaine =

British politician (born 1969)

Matt Turmaine MP
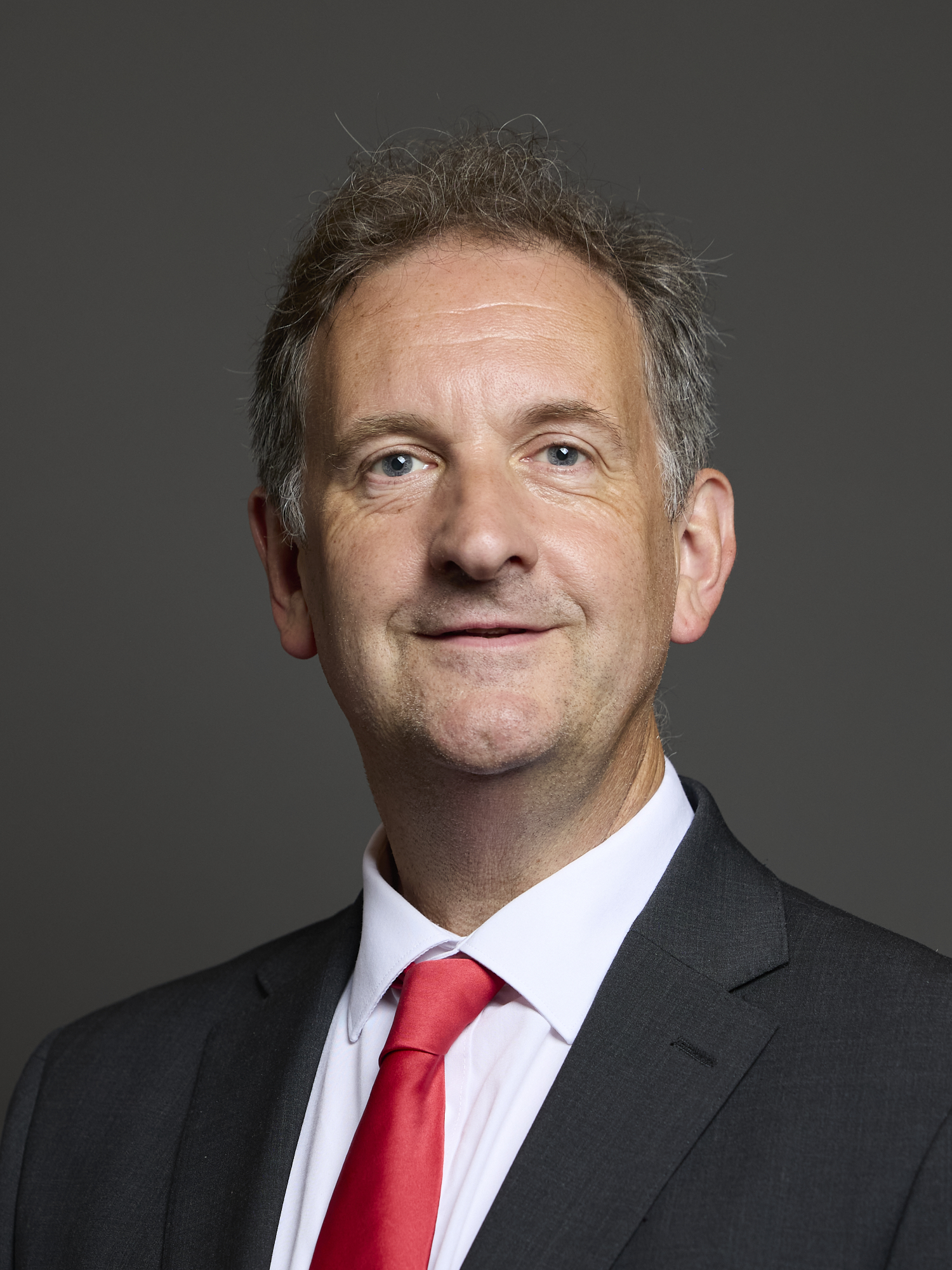
- Official portrait, 2024

Member of Parliament for Watford
- Incumbent
- Assumed office 4 July 2024
- Preceded by: Dean Russell
- Majority: 4,723 (10.62%)

Watford Borough Councillor for Holywell
- In office 7 May 2012 – 7 March 2025
- Preceded by: Emma Hines-Randall
- Succeeded by: Asma Suleman

Personal details
- Born: Matthew Robert Turmaine; 1969 (age 56–57) Amersham, Buckinghamshire, England
- Party: Labour
- Other political affiliations: Labour and Co-operative (2022–2024)
- Spouse: Jeanette
- Children: 2
- Education: St Clement Danes School
- Alma mater: University of Birmingham (BSc)
- Website: mattturmaine.co.uk

Matthew Robert Turmaine (born 1969) is a British Labour Party politician who has been the Member of Parliament (MP) for Watford since the 2024 general election. He was previously the Watford Borough Councillor for Holywell ward from 2012 until 2025.

== Early life and education ==
Turmaine was born in 1969 at Amersham Hospital in Amersham, Buckinghamshire. His father was a compositor and his mother was a dressmaker. Turmaine attended St Clement Danes School in Chorleywood and spent much of his childhood in Watford, before moving there permanently in 2011. In his 20s, he travelled around the United States, where he visited almost every state and slept rough in Los Angeles. He graduated with a degree in economics and modern history from the University of Birmingham.

== Political career ==
Turmaine joined the Labour Party in 2004, whilst living in London. He stood as the Labour Party candidate for one of the three Fulham Reach seats on the Hammersmith and Fulham Council in the 2006 election, where he received 1,207 votes and finished sixth out of eight candidates. In the 2010 Hammersmith and Fulham Council election, Turmaine stood as the Labour candidate for one of the three North End seats, receiving 1,679 votes and finishing sixth out of nine candidates. After moving to Watford in 2011, he stood as the Labour candidate for Holywell ward in the 2012 Watford Borough Council election, where he gained the seat from the Liberal Democrats with a majority of 710 votes. In the 2015 general election, Turmaine was selected as the Labour parliamentary candidate for Watford, a historical Bellwether seat, where he finished in second place below the incumbent Richard Harrington of the Conservative Party. In both the 2016 and 2018 council elections, he retained his Holywell seat with an increased majority.

In the 2019 general election, Turmaine was selected as the Labour parliamentary candidate for his home seat of Chesham and Amersham, where he finished third below the Liberal Democrat candidate and the Conservative incumbent Cheryl Gillan. He then held his Holywell seat in the 2022 council election with a reduced majority. In July 2022, Turmaine was again selected as the Labour parliamentary candidate for Watford. Throughout the 2024 election campaign, Turmaine pledged to reduce the tax burden on Watford families and waiting times at Watford General Hospital as well as recruiting more teachers to Watford schools, in line with the Labour Party manifesto. He was elected as the MP for Watford in the 2024 general election, defeating the Conservative incumbent Dean Russell with a majority of 4,723 votes. In his victory speech, Turmaine thanked the people of Watford for putting their trust in him.

== Political positions ==
=== Russia and Ukraine ===
Turmaine supported Ukraine following Russia's 2022 invasion. In November 2024, he asked defense secretary John Healey what the government was providing to support Ukraine in "their quest to preserve their freedom".

=== Israel and Palestine ===
In November 2023, Turmaine called the October 7 attacks "horrifying" and stated the situation in the Gaza Strip was a "humanitarian catastrophe". He stated his support for a ceasefire to alleviate the "suffering of Palestinian citizens" and called for Hamas to release their Israeli hostages. He also stated that it was "unacceptable" that Israel had not lifted siege conditions. In April 2024, Turmaine criticised attacks on World Central Kitchen aid workers in Gaza and called on the government to end British arms exports to Israel "in light of legal expertise and advice provided to [them]". In January 2025, he welcomed the ceasefire and stated that he hoped "with all that is good in the world, that peace will prevail and the violence is over".

== Personal life ==
Turmaine and his wife Jeanette have two children. He is a member of the Unison trade union. Turmaine is a member of the LGBT+ community. Before his election to Parliament, he worked in health and social care for Hertfordshire County Council. He had also previously worked in public relations for the BBC from November 1998 to January 2002. Turmaine supports Watford FC.

== Electoral performance ==
=== House of Commons ===
General election 2024: Watford
Party	Candidate	Votes	%	±%
Labour	Matt Turmaine	15,708	35.3	–4.0
Conservative	Dean Russell	10,985	24.7	–17.3
Liberal Democrats	Ian Stotesbury	7,577	17.0	–0.7
Reform	Gary Ling	4,930	11.1	New
Workers Party	Khalid Mahmood Chohan	2,659	6.0	New
Green	Arran Bowen-la Grange	2,428	5.5	+5.2
Heritage	Sarah Knott	168	0.4	New
Majority		4,723	10.62	+3.02
Turnout		44,455	61.0%	–7.50
Labour gain from Conservative		Swing		

General election 2019: Chesham and Amersham
Party	Candidate	Votes	%	±%
Conservative	Cheryl Gillan	30,850	55.4	–5.3
Liberal Democrats	Dan Gallagher	14,627	26.3	+13.3
Labour	Matt Turmaine	7,166	12.9	–7.7
Green	Alan Booth	3,042	5.5	+2.5
Majority		16,223	29.1	–11.0
Turnout		55,685	76.8	–0.3
Conservative hold		Swing		

General election 2015: Watford
Party	Candidate	Votes	%	±%
Conservative	Richard Harrington	24,400	43.5	+8.6
Labour	Matthew Turmaine	14,606	26.0	–0.7
Liberal Democrats	Dorothy Thornhill	10,152	18.1	–14.3
UKIP	Nick Lincoln	5,481	9.8	+7.6
Green	Aidan Cottrell-Boyce	1,332	2.4	+0.8
TUSC	Mark O'Connor	178	0.3	New
Majority		9,794	17.5	+15.0
Turnout		56,149	66.6	–1.7
Conservative hold		Swing	+4.6	

=== Watford Borough Council ===
2022 Watford Borough Council election: Holywell ward
Party	Candidate	Votes	%	±%
Labour Co-op	Matt Turmaine	949	53.2	–12.4
Conservative	Sanjaya Pant	426	23.9	+9.9
Liberal Democrats	Penelope Hill	360	20.2	–0.2
TUSC	Mark O'Connor	49	2.7	New
Majority		523	29.3	N/A
Turnout		1,784	27.4	
Labour Co-op hold		Swing	–11.1	

2018 Watford Borough Council election: Holywell ward
Party	Candidate	Votes	%	±%
Labour	Matt Turmaine	1,402	65.61	
Liberal Democrats	Syed Kazmi	436	20.40	
Conservative	Yasmin Goldsmith	299	13.99	
Majority		966	45.21	
Turnout		2137	33.38	
Labour hold		Swing		

2016 Watford Borough Council election: Holywell ward (3 seats)
Party	Candidate	Votes	%	±%
Labour	Nigel Bell	1,200		
Labour	Jackie Connal	924		
Labour	Matt Turmaine	917		
Liberal Democrats	Simonie Rose Jeffree	210		
Conservative	Penelope Anne Mortimer	208		
UKIP	Gavin Stephen Smith	199		
Liberal Democrats	Frances Kershaw	184		
Liberal Democrats	Qaiser Mahmood	172		
Conservative	Prasi Bhatt	144		
Conservative	Camilla Zaman Khawaja	134		
Green	Rhiannon Emma Louise Grant	133		
Green	Jim Grant	108		
Green	Anne Simpson	72		
TUSC	Clive Jones	39		
Turnout			26.15	
Labour hold		Swing		
Labour hold		Swing		
Labour hold		Swing		

2012 Watford Borough Council election: Holywell ward
Party	Candidate	Votes	%	±%
Labour	Matt Turmaine	1,016	62.9	–5.5
Liberal Democrats	Mohammed Umar	306	19.0	+3.1
Conservative	Neil John Punter	165	10.2	–1.5
Green	Nigel Anthony Filer	127	7.9	+3.9
Majority		710	42.9	
Turnout		1614	26.15	
Labour gain from Liberal Democrats		Swing		

=== Hammersmith and Fulham Council ===
2010 Hammersmith and Fulham Council election: North End ward (3 seats)
Party	Candidate	Votes	%	±%
Conservative	Georgie Cooney	2,125		
Labour	Daryl Brown	1,987		
Conservative	Tom Crofts	1,979		
Conservative	Caroline R. Ffiske	1,842		
Labour	Max Schmid	1,697		
Labour	Matt Turmaine	1,679		
Liberal Democrats	Robert Falkner	998		
Liberal Democrats	Patrick C. Mcveigh	810		
Liberal Democrats	Meher Oliaji	774		
Turnout				
Conservative hold		Swing		
Labour gain from Conservative		Swing		
Conservative hold		Swing		

2006 Hammersmith and Fulham Council election: Fulham Reach ward (3 seats)
Party	Candidate	Votes	%	±%
Conservative	Gavin Donovan	1,683		
Conservative	Paul Bristow	1,635		
Conservative	Andrew Johnson	1,573		
Labour	Stephen B. Burke	1,284		
Labour	Oliver P. Cardigan	1,222		
Labour	Matthew R. Turmaine	1,207		
Liberal Democrats	Elizabeth M. Stephens	407		
Liberal Democrats	Marytka K. Jablkowska	341		
Turnout			44.1	
Conservative hold		Swing		
Conservative gain from Labour		Swing		
Conservative hold		Swing		

Parliament of the United Kingdom
Preceded by Dean Russell	Member of Parliament for Watford; 2024–present	Incumbent
Political offices
Preceded by Emma Hines-Randall	Watford Borough Councillor for Holywell; 2012–2025	Succeeded by Asma Suleman
