= Nick Botterill =

British businessman

Nicholas Byron Botterill (born 14 September 1962) is a British businessman, company director, and Conservative politician.

He was Leader of the Hammersmith and Fulham London Borough Council from 2012 to 2014 and was a member of Wiltshire Council from 2021 to 2025.

== Early life ==
Botterill is the son of David Byron Botterill, senior partner of Byron Botterill & Son Limited, a Yorkshire company which made polishing materials. He was brought up in Sheffield and educated at Christ Church, Oxford, where he gained a Master of Science degree in chemistry.

== Business career ==
Botterill's first job was in the international corporate finance department of the Royal Bank of Canada. After that, he was a founding partner in Teddies Nurseries, a childcare provider which expanded to some forty sites around Britain and in the 1990s was among the ten fastest-growing British companies. In 2000, the business was sold to BUPA and went on to become one of the largest companies in its sector in the world. From 1998 to 2006, Botterill was a director of the Old Oak Housing Association. In 2005, he founded Active Learning, another childcare firm. He has also served on the boards of several other companies and trusts, including Palatinate Schools Ltd.

== Councillor ==

In 1986, Botterill moved to Hammersmith and soon became a Conservative activist there. From 1990 to 1993 he was chairman of the Hammersmith Conservative Association. In 1996 he was elected as a councillor of the London Borough of Hammersmith and Fulham in the Sulivan ward, and said he would fight for better living conditions in his ward. In May 1997, he became the Conservative group's housing spokesman, taking over from Mark Loveday. He remained in this role in 1999, under the new Conservative group leader Greg Hands. Following boundary changes, Botterill was re-elected in the Parsons Green and Walham ward. The Conservatives gained control of the council in May 2006. By 2011, Botterill was deputy leader of the council and was serving as its cabinet member for Environment.

== Leader of Hammersmith and Fulham ==
In May 2012, Botterill succeeded Stephen Greenhalgh as leader of the council, when Greenhalgh moved on to become Deputy Mayor of London for Policing and Crime under Boris Johnson.

In August 2012, Botterill and his cabinet agreed to sell the land on which two housing estates stood, at West Kensington and Gibbs Green, to a subsidiary of the developer Capco for £105m, and permission was also given for the Earls Court Exhibition Centre to be demolished, as part of a project to create a new 77-acre high-rise urban quarter. In 2013, Botterill continued to promote the £8 billion redevelopment of Earl's Court and welcomed the decision of Eric Pickles not to call the plans in for a Planning Inspectorate hearing.

In 2013, Hammersmith and Fulham LBC reduced its council tax charges by 3 per cent, and Botterill published an article in The Municipal Journal called "How to cut council tax and improve services".

Botterill proved to be the last Conservative leader of Hammersmith and Fulham, as his party lost control of the borough at the 2014 elections. He had expected to win narrowly and explained the loss by pointing to the Lib Dem vote collapsing to Labour and the fast-changing demographics of the borough. Botterill held his own seat and continued to serve as a borough councillor until the 2018 elections, when he stood again and lost in the Wormholt and White City ward.

== Later life ==
By 2019, Botterill was living in Wiltshire, and at the 2019 United Kingdom general election acted as election agent for James Gray, the Conservative member of parliament for North Wiltshire.

In March 2020, Botterill was selected as the Conservative candidate for a by-election in the Wiltshire Council By Brook division, following the resignation of Jane Scott, Baroness Scott of Bybrook, who had been appointed as a government whip in the House of Lords. However, the by-election was cancelled only a month later, due to COVID-19 lockdown guidance. Botterill commented to the Gazette and Herald that this was "completely the right decision under the circumstances".

Botterill was finally elected to Wiltshire Council at the four-yearly elections held on 6 May 2021. As of 2025, he was its Cabinet Member for Finance, Development Management, and Strategic Planning, but lost his seat at the elections on 1 May.

== Private life ==
In 2000, Botterill married Anna E. Lee in Devon. He is currently married with two children, Emma and Luke.
