= Greg Smith (British politician) =

British politician (born 1979)

Greg Smith MP
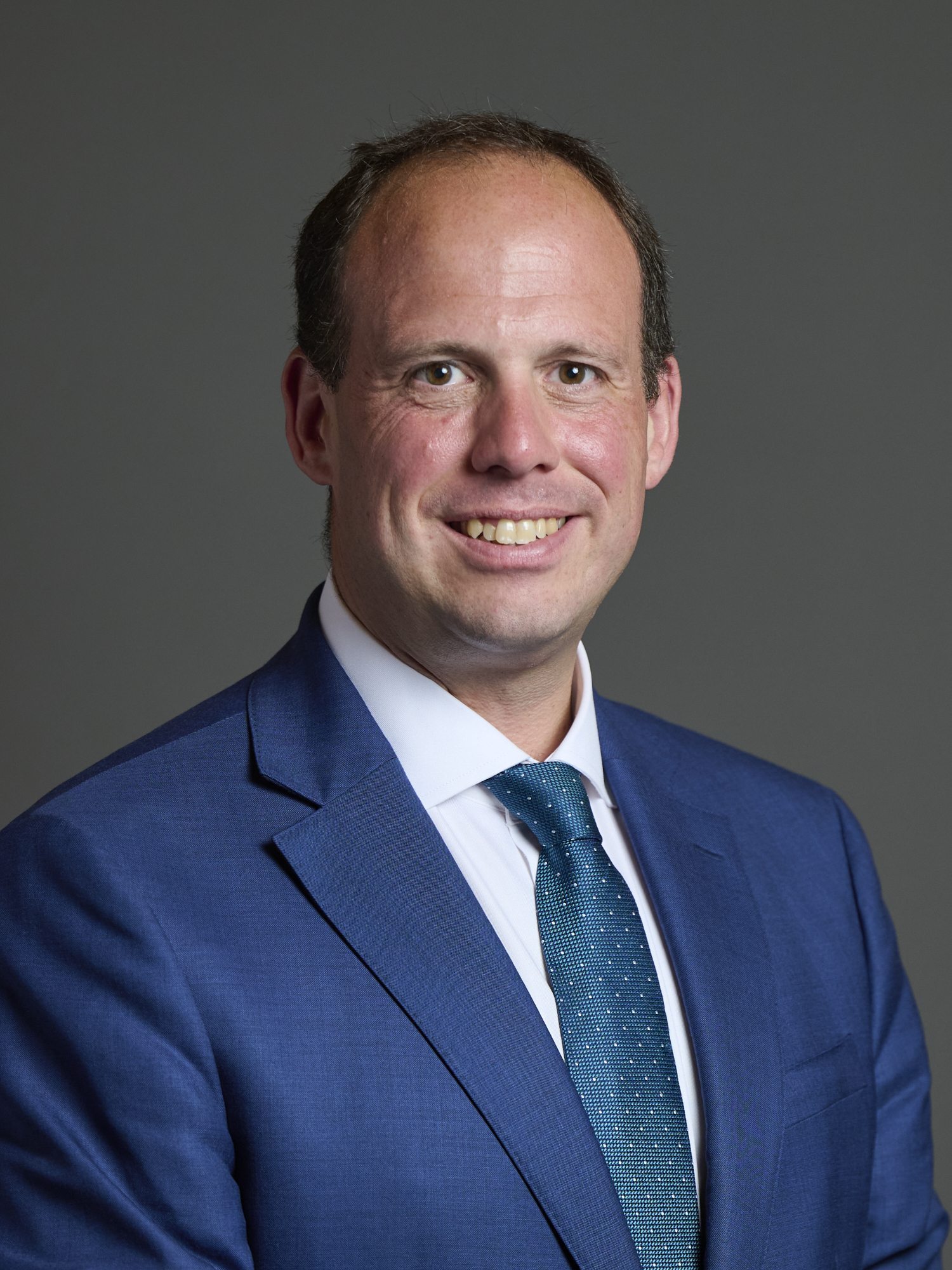
- Official portrait, 2024

Shadow Parliamentary Under-Secretary for Business and Trade
- In office 19 July 2024 – 23 July 2025
- Leader: Rishi Sunak; Kemi Badenoch
- Succeeded by: Gareth Davies

Commons Opposition Whip
- In office 20 November 2024 – 22 July 2025
- Leader: Kemi Badenoch

Member of Parliament for Mid Buckinghamshire Buckingham (2019–2024)
- Incumbent
- Assumed office 12 December 2019
- Preceded by: John Bercow
- Majority: 5,872 (10.8%)

Shadow Parliamentary Under-Secretary for Transport
- Incumbent
- Assumed office 22 July 2025
- Leader: Kemi Badenoch

Shadow Parliamentary Under-Secretary for Energy Security and Net Zero
- Incumbent
- Assumed office 22 July 2025
- Leader: Kemi Badenoch

Personal details
- Born: Gregory David Smith; 3 March 1979 (age 47) Bromsgrove, Worcestershire, England
- Party: Conservative
- Spouse: Annalise
- Education: University of Birmingham
- Website: www.gregsmith.co.uk

Gregory David Smith (born 3 March 1979) is a British politician who was elected as the Member of Parliament (MP) for the Mid Buckinghamshire constituency in the 2024 general election, having previously served as the MP for Buckingham from 2019. A member of the Conservative Party, Smith was previously deputy leader of Hammersmith and Fulham London Borough Council.

== Early life and education ==
Smith was privately educated at Bromsgrove School and then studied at the University of Birmingham. He has had a career in design and marketing. Smith was a trustee of Riverside Studios from 2008 to 2019.

== Political career ==
Smith was a councillor on Hammersmith and Fulham Council between May 2006 and May 2018, and was also deputy leader of the council. In 2014, the Conservatives lost control of the council to Labour in the local elections, and Smith was appointed as Leader of the Conservative group. He stood down from the council in the 2018 elections.

At the 2017 general election, Smith stood as the Conservative Party candidate in Hayes and Harlington, where he came second to the Labour Party incumbent John McDonnell with 28.6% of the vote.

In October 2019, Smith was announced as the Conservative prospective parliamentary candidate for Buckingham, following the announcement by the Speaker of the House of Commons John Bercow that he would stand down at the end of October. At the 2019 general election, Smith was elected as MP for Buckingham with 58.4% of the vote and a majority of 20,411.

In the 2024 general election Smith stood in the new constituency of Mid Buckinghamshire and was elected with 37.3% of the vote and a majority of 5,782.

Smith announced his opposition to HS2 and the East West Expressway as part of his campaign. He is a supporter of Brexit.

Smith opposes a Ministry of Justice plan to build a third prison in his constituency.

Smith was appointed as a member of the Transport Select Committee in February 2020. He is the co-chair of the Conservative rightwing Free-Market Forum. In May 2021 he became chairman of the Minimally Invasive Cancer Therapies all-party parliamentary group.

Smith is a member of the Conservative Friends of Israel group.

=== Controversies ===
In October 2020, following a national campaign by footballer Marcus Rashford, the Labour Party put down a House of Commons motion to extend the free school meals food vouchers to cover the October 2020 half-term break. Many local councils, individuals and businesses volunteered to offer assistance to FareShare to help them serve people in need. Despite Smith's vote against the motion, he applied to one such volunteer organisation (a cafe in his former constituency at Ivinghoe) for a photo opportunity to "help get the meals ready for distribution or help with delivery". The request was refused by the cafe owners with national publicity.

== Personal life ==
He moved to Wendover, Buckinghamshire, with his second wife, Annalise, in 2017.

In 2021, Smith and his family moved to the Buckinghamshire village of Chearsley.

Parliament of the United Kingdom
Preceded by John Bercow	Member of Parliament for Buckingham; 2019–2024	Constituency abolished
New constituency	Member of Parliament for Mid Buckinghamshire; 2024–present	Incumbent
