= 2012 Watford Borough Council election =

2012 UK local government election

2012 local election results in Watford

Elections to Watford Borough Council were held on 3 May 2012. Three years in every four, a third of the council (12 councillors) retires and elections are held (in the fourth year, elections are held for county councillors).

In this council election, the Labour Party gained two seats from the Liberal Democrats; the Liberal Democrats gained one from the Conservatives. However, the Liberal Democrats remained firmly in control of the council. Four parties, Liberal Democrats, Labour, Conservative and Green, all put up candidates in every seat. There were also three UKIP candidates.

In the year following this election there will not be elections to the Borough Council (apart from by-elections) and Hertfordshire County elections will be held in May 2013. In the years 2010 to 2012, although the Labour Party recovered from its worst position, in 2010, it has only won seats in its three strongest wards and has yet to challenge the Liberal Democrats grip on votes and power. Labour has, however, supplanted the Conservatives as the main opposition party (albeit still 15 seats short of the Liberal Democrats) and the Greens continue to hold their own in Callowland ward, pushing the Conservatives into the smallest party position.

After the election, the composition of the council was:

- Liberal Democrat: 23
- Labour: 8
- Green: 3
- Conservative: 2

== Council election result ==
Watford local election result 2012
Party	Seats	Gains	Losses	Net gain/loss	Seats %	Votes %	Votes	+/−
Liberal Democrats	8	1	2	-1	66.7	41.3	8378	
Labour	3	2	-	+2	25.0	28.6	5799	
Conservative	0	-	-1	-1		18.2	3699	
Green	1	-	-	-	8.3	10.2	2073	
UKIP						1.8	358	

== Ward results ==
Callowland
Party	Candidate	Votes	%	±%
Green	Ian Brandon	793	53.7	−4.9
Labour	Guru Awasthi	415	28.1	+5.6
Conservative	Sally Anne Punter	147	10.0	−2.1
Liberal Democrats	Patricia Gollop	121	8.2	+1.4
Majority		378	25.6	
Turnout		1476	26.50	
Green hold		Swing		

Central
Party	Candidate	Votes	%	±%
Liberal Democrats	Rabi Martins	816	47.6	+5.5
Labour	Fred Grindrod	532	31.0	−5.1
Conservative	Carole Ann Bamford	186	10.8	−2.2
Green	Su Murray	106	6.2	+0.7
UKIP	Renie Price	76	4.4	+1.1
Majority		284	16.6	
Turnout		1716	27.15	
Liberal Democrats hold		Swing		

Holywell
Party	Candidate	Votes	%	±%
Labour	Matt Turmaine	1016	62.9	−5.5
Liberal Democrats	Mohammed Umar	306	19.0	+3.1
Conservative	Neil John Punter	165	10.2	−1.5
Green	Nigel Anthony Filer	127	7.9	+3.9
Majority		710	42.9	
Turnout		1614	26.15	
Labour gain from Liberal Democrats		Swing		

Leggatts
Party	Candidate	Votes	%	±%
Labour	Anne Joynes	784	45.1	+9.8
Liberal Democrats	Dennis Wharton	536	30.8	+11.0
Green	Alison Jane Wiesner	239	13.8	−1.0
Conservative	Youseffe Fahmy	179	10.3	−19.8
Majority		248	14.3	
Turnout		1738	31.76	
Labour gain from Liberal Democrats		Swing		

Meriden
Party	Candidate	Votes	%	±%
Liberal Democrats	Jan Brown	690	43.0	−0.6
Labour	Seamus Williams	445	27.7	−0.8
UKIP	Nicholas Richard Lincoln	198	12.3	+12.3
Conservative	Penelope Anne Mortimer	196	12.2	−10.7
Green	Paula Mary Evelyn Brodhurst	75	4.7	−0.2
Majority		245	15.3	
Turnout		1604	27.51	
Liberal Democrats hold		Swing		

Nascot
Party	Candidate	Votes	%	±%
Liberal Democrats	Mark John Hofman	983	42.8	−2.6
Conservative	Andrew Graham Mortimer	931	40.5	+4.2
Labour	Michael Harry Barnes	217	9.4	−2.3
Green	Sally Rose Ivins	168	7.3	+0.7
Majority		52	2.3	
Turnout		2299	37.74	
Liberal Democrats gain from Conservative		Swing		

Oxhey
Party	Candidate	Votes	%	±%
Liberal Democrats	Peter Taylor	1058	63.2	+8.0
Conservative	Dick Bamford	301	18.0	−4.7
Labour	Sue Sleeman	244	14.6	−1.7
Green	Eric Weatherly	72	4.3	−1.6
Majority		757	45.2	
Turnout		1675	32.01	
Liberal Democrats hold		Swing		

Park
Party	Candidate	Votes	%	±%
Liberal Democrats	George Derbyshire	1168	47.7	+4.4
Conservative	Linda Ann Topping	863	35.3	−3.4
Labour	David Corbet Connal	234	9.6	−1.4
Green	Dorothy Mary Nixon	99	4.0	−0.4
UKIP	David Penn	84	3.4	+0.9
Majority		305	12.4	
Turnout		2448	40.47	
Liberal Democrats hold		Swing		

Stanborough
Party	Candidate	Votes	%	±%
Liberal Democrats	Tim Williams	885	58.6	+5.9
Labour	Mark John Nicholas	289	19.1	+2.0
Conservative	Chris Hawes	259	17.1	−8.0
Green	George Mathew Ryan	78	5.2	+0.1
Majority		596	39.5	
Turnout		1511	28.03	
Liberal Democrats hold		Swing		

Tudor
Party	Candidate	Votes	%	±%
Liberal Democrats	Darren Walford	709	48.6	+6.9
Labour	Geoffrey Pearce	326	22.3	+0.4
Conservative	Richard Lloyd Vaughan Southern	323	22.1	−0.9
Green	Clare Victoria Pitkin	101	6.9	−0.8
Majority		383	26.3	
Turnout		1459	30.71	
Liberal Democrats hold		Swing		

Vicarage
Party	Candidate	Votes	%	±%
Labour	Mo Mills	1044	59.4	+9.3
Liberal Democrats	Mehran Nawabi	438	24.9	−2.6
Conservative	Dave Ealey	171	9.7	+0.5
Green	Helen Elizabeth Wynne	105	6.0	+0.9
Majority		606	34.5	
Turnout		1758	29.95	
Labour hold		Swing		

Woodside
Party	Candidate	Votes	%	±%
Liberal Democrats	Ian Gordon Brown	668	44.6	+3.8
Conservative	Tony Rogers	466	31.1	+2.1
Labour	Omar Ismail	253	16.9	−6.5
Green	Christina Patricia Murphy	110	7.3	+0.6
Majority		202	13.5	
Turnout		1497	27.80	
Liberal Democrats hold		Swing		
