= 2018 Hammersmith and Fulham London Borough Council election =

2018 local election in England

2018 Hammersmith and Fulham Borough Council election
| ← 2014 | 3 May 2018 | 2022 → |

All 46 seats to Hammersmith and Fulham Council 24 seats needed for a majority
- Turnout: 39.0% (▲2.4%)

| | First party | Second party |
|---|---|---|
| Party | Labour | Conservative |
| Last election | 26 seats, 42.2% | 20 seats, 37.9% |
| Seats won | 35 | 11 |
| Seat change | ▲9 | ▼9 |
| Popular vote | 27,401 | 18,279 |
| Percentage | 52.0% | 34.7% |
| Swing | ▲9.8% | ▼3.2% |
- Map of the results of the 2018 Hammersmith and Fulham council election. Conservatives in blue and Labour in red.
Council control before election
Labour
Council control after election
Labour

A map showing the wards of Hammersmith and Fulham since 2002

The 2018 Hammersmith and Fulham Council election took place on 3 May 2018 to elect members of Hammersmith and Fulham Council in London.

== Overall results ==
Hammersmith and Fulham London Borough Council

Structure
- Seats: 46 councillors
- Political groups: Majority Party (35): Labour (35); Opposition (11): Conservative (11)

Hammersmith and Fulham Council election result 2018
| Party | Seats | Gains | Losses | Net gain/loss | Seats % | Votes % | Votes | +/− |
|---|---|---|---|---|---|---|---|---|
| Labour | 35 | 9 | 0 | +9 | 76.1 | 54.3 | 77,407 | +8.1 |
| Conservative | 11 | 0 | 9 | -9 | 23.9 | 33.8 | 48,192 | -7.4 |
| Liberal Democrats | 0 | 0 | 0 | 0 | | 11.2 | 15,937 | +3.5 |
| Green | 0 | 0 | 0 | 0 | | 0.5 | 660 | -2.0 |
| UKIP | 0 | 0 | 0 | 0 | | 0.1 | 183 | -1.4 |
| Independent | 0 | 0 | 0 | 0 | | 0.1 | 89 | +0.1 |

Labour consolidated control of the council by gaining 9 seats (in addition to the 11 they gained in 2014), winning 35 in all. The Conservatives lost 9 seats, winning 11 in all. This was the lowest number of Conservative councillors since 1986.

There were no wards with split party representation – for only the fourth time in the fifteen elections since the council was created in 1968. The previous occasions when this occurred was 1990, 1978 and the 1971 Labour landslide.

Another sign of the increased homogeneity was the number of wards where the winning party got less than 50% of the vote – just three wards this time. Ravenscourt Park with 46%, Town with 48% and Sands End with a fraction under 50%. This compares with the 2014 election when there were 6 wards including Sands End with 38%. In the 2010 election there were 10 wards including Addison with 39%. And in the 2006 election there were also 10 wards including Askew with 39%.

26 Councillors successfully retained their seats – 20 Labour and 6 Conservative. 5 sitting Councillors were defeated – all Conservative, including the previous opposition leader.

The ward with the highest percentage vote for one party was Wormholt and White City which saw a 76.5% vote share for the Labour Party. This is the highest percentage any party has achieved at the five elections since these wards were established in 2002. Vote share percentages by ward for previous elections are not currently available.

The largest percentage change was in the Shepherds Bush Green ward, where the Labour Party increased its vote share by 20.9 percentage points – as the Green Party did not stand a candidate this time round. The largest percentage decrease was in the Fulham Reach ward where the Conservative vote dropped by 14.6 percentage points.

The candidate with the largest individual tally was Lisa Homan with 2,577 votes in the Askew ward. This veteran councillor has been elected on all but one occasion since 1994 – losing out in 2002 by 44 votes.

One of the successful Conservative candidates in Palace Riverside had been deselected from the same ward in 2006, and had run as an independent candidate – coming within 146 votes of winning at that election.

The Liberal Democrats fielded a full slate of 46 candidates – in 2014 they put forward 39 candidates for election.

UKIP fielded 3 candidates – in 2014 they had 7 candidates.

The Green Party fielded 2 candidates – in 2014 they had 7 candidates.

There was 1 Independent candidate – the same number as in 2014, although a different individual. The 2018 independent had previously run in the same ward in the 2006 local election and in the Hammersmith constituency at the 2017 general election.

TUSC did not stand any candidates in the 2018 local elections – they had two candidates in Hammersmith and Fulham in 2014.

National Health Action Party did not field candidates in the 2018 local elections – they had a single candidate in Hammersmith and Fulham in 2014.

== Ward results ==
(*) represents a candidate seeking re-election in the same ward.

(~) represents a candidate seeking re-election in a different ward.

=== Addison ===
Addison (3)
| Party | Candidate | Votes | % | ±% |
|---|---|---|---|---|
| Labour | Sue Fennimore* | 1,902 | 54.5 | +7.5 |
| Labour | Adam Connell* | 1,849 | 52.9 | +5.1 |
| Labour | Rachel Leighton | 1,762 | 50.5 | +9.1 |
| Conservative | Clare Ambrosino | 1,153 | 33.0 | −11.4 |
| Conservative | James Colquhoun | 1,114 | 31.9 | −9.8 |
| Conservative | Al Lewis | 983 | 28.2 | −13.5 |
| Green | Liz Goad | 330 | 9.5 | N/A |
| Liberal Democrats | Laura Goeman | 322 | 9.2 | −4.7 |
| Liberal Democrats | Luke Blackett | 313 | 9.0 | N/A |
| Liberal Democrats | Andrew Leitch | 251 | 7.2 | N/A |
| UKIP | Maggie Casey | 62 | 1.8 | N/A |
| UKIP | Elizabeth Jones | 50 | 1.4 | N/A |
| Majority | | 609 | 17.5 | |
| Turnout | | | 41.66% | −1.3% |
| Labour hold | | Swing | | |
| Labour hold | | Swing | | |
| Labour gain from Conservative | | Swing | | |

=== Askew ===
Askew (3)
| Party | Candidate | Votes | % | ±% |
|---|---|---|---|---|
| Labour | Lisa Homan* | 2,577 | 68.9 | +15.1 |
| Labour | Rory Vaughan* | 2,515 | 67.3 | +16.0 |
| Labour | Rowan Ree | 2,466 | 66.0 | +5.8 |
| Conservative | Dominic Masters | 690 | 18.5 | −5.8 |
| Conservative | Paul Thomas | 658 | 17.6 | −3.6 |
| Conservative | Arunasalam Yogeswaran | 579 | 15.5 | −5.0 |
| Liberal Democrats | Catherine Remy | 504 | 13.5 | +6.3 |
| Liberal Democrats | Florian Chevoppe-Verdier | 468 | 12.5 | +2.8 |
| Liberal Democrats | Janet Burden | 463 | 12.4 | +5.8 |
| Majority | | 1776 | 47.5 | |
| Turnout | | | 37.06% | +0.1% |
| Labour hold | | Swing | | |
| Labour hold | | Swing | | |
| Labour hold | | Swing | | |

=== Avonmore and Brook Green ===
Avonmore and Brook Green (3)
| Party | Candidate | Votes | % | ±% |
|---|---|---|---|---|
| Labour | Rebecca Harvey | 1,807 | 52.0 | +8.4 |
| Labour | David Morton | 1,794 | 51.7 | +12.5 |
| Labour | Fiona Smith | 1,696 | 48.8 | +12.4 |
| Conservative | Caroline Ffiske* | 1,329 | 38.3 | −4.1 |
| Conservative | Joe Carlebach* | 1,299 | 37.4 | −7.1 |
| Conservative | Will Marshall | 1,170 | 33.7 | −7.2 |
| Liberal Democrats | Billy Dann | 348 | 10.0 | +0.5 |
| Liberal Democrats | Cecile Fossy | 338 | 9.7 | +0.3 |
| Liberal Democrats | Julie Perrin | 337 | 9.7 | +1.0 |
| Majority | | 367 | 10.5 | |
| Turnout | | | 42.48% | +5.6% |
| Labour gain from Conservative | | Swing | | |
| Labour hold | | Swing | | |
| Labour gain from Conservative | | Swing | | |

=== College Park and Old Oak ===
College Park and Old Oak (2)
| Party | Candidate | Votes | % | ±% |
|---|---|---|---|---|
| Labour | Wesley Harcourt* | 1,459 | 73.6 | +14.6 |
| Labour | Alexandra Sanderson | 1,360 | 68.6 | +5.0 |
| Conservative | Marie Higton | 372 | 18.9 | −1.9 |
| Conservative | Paul Keegan | 357 | 18.0 | +1.0 |
| Liberal Democrats | Niamh McCarthy | 119 | 6.0 | −1.4 |
| Liberal Democrats | Steve Baxter | 117 | 5.9 | N/A |
| Majority | | 988 | 49.7 | |
| Turnout | | | 33.02% | +1.3% |
| Labour hold | | Swing | | |
| Labour hold | | Swing | | |

=== Fulham Broadway ===
Fulham Broadway (3)
| Party | Candidate | Votes | % | ±% |
|---|---|---|---|---|
| Labour | Ben Coleman* | 1,720 | 56.2 | +5.9 |
| Labour | Alan de'Ath* | 1,611 | 52.6 | +3.8 |
| Labour | Sharon Holder* | 1,590 | 51.9 | +2.6 |
| Conservative | Adam Carew | 1,094 | 35.7 | −4.4 |
| Conservative | Aliya Afzal Khan | 1,045 | 34.1 | −5.3 |
| Conservative | Matt Fincham | 1,028 | 33.6 | −5.1 |
| Liberal Democrats | Natasha Farrant | 267 | 8.7 | +1.7 |
| Liberal Democrats | Penelope Stradling | 260 | 8.5 | +1.6 |
| Liberal Democrats | Michael Cook | 258 | 8.4 | +2.4 |
| Majority | | 496 | 16.2 | |
| Turnout | | | 37.69% | −1.7% |
| Labour hold | | Swing | | |
| Labour hold | | Swing | | |
| Labour hold | | Swing | | |

=== Fulham Reach ===
Fulham Reach (3)
| Party | Candidate | Votes | % | ±% |
|---|---|---|---|---|
| Labour | Christabel Cooper | 2,034 | 60.0 | +13.8 |
| Labour | Iain Cassidy* | 1,976 | 58.3 | +11.8 |
| Labour | Guy Vincent* | 1,903 | 56.2 | +13.0 |
| Conservative | Gabriel Gavin | 958 | 28.3 | −14.3 |
| Conservative | Rory Boden | 956 | 28.2 | −13.1 |
| Conservative | Dorinne Tin Ming Kaw | 892 | 26.3 | −14.5 |
| Green | Jimi Davies | 330 | 9.7 | N/A |
| Liberal Democrats | Jenny Beardmore | 320 | 9.4 | +1.9 |
| Liberal Democrats | Rutger Wip | 227 | 6.7 | +1.5 |
| Liberal Democrats | George Cotcher-Riley | 211 | 6.2 | +1.5 |
| Majority | | 945 | 27.9 | |
| Turnout | | | 41.38% | −0.3% |
| Labour hold | | Swing | | |
| Labour hold | | Swing | | |
| Labour hold | | Swing | | |

=== Hammersmith Broadway ===
Hammersmith Broadway (3)
| Party | Candidate | Votes | % | ±% |
|---|---|---|---|---|
| Labour | Stephen Cowan* | 2,255 | 68.6 | +15.0 |
| Labour | PJ Murphy* | 2,188 | 66.6 | +13.0 |
| Labour | Patricia Quigley | 2,126 | 64.7 | +11.6 |
| Conservative | Naomi Greaves | 658 | 20.0 | −9.3 |
| Conservative | David Rogers | 644 | 19.6 | −5.8 |
| Conservative | Younis Mageit | 579 | 17.6 | −7.4 |
| Liberal Democrats | David Burridge | 407 | 12.4 | +2.8 |
| Liberal Democrats | Jessie Venegas-Garcia | 373 | 11.4 | +2.7 |
| Liberal Democrats | Christine Longworth | 340 | 10.3 | +2.8 |
| Majority | | 1468 | 44.7 | |
| Turnout | | | 38.81% | +1.8% |
| Labour hold | | Swing | | |
| Labour hold | | Swing | | |
| Labour hold | | Swing | | |

=== Munster ===
Munster (3)
| Party | Candidate | Votes | % | ±% |
|---|---|---|---|---|
| Conservative | Adronie Alford* | 1,374 | 51.4 | −4.3 |
| Conservative | Alex Karmel* | 1,367 | 51.1 | −3.6 |
| Conservative | Dominic Stanton | 1,316 | 49.2 | −8.9 |
| Labour | Emma Cooper | 900 | 33.6 | +7.7 |
| Labour | Nikolaos Souslous | 800 | 29.9 | +6.6 |
| Labour | Leo Watson | 786 | 29.4 | +8.6 |
| Liberal Democrats | Philip Barton | 406 | 15.2 | +5.7 |
| Liberal Democrats | Ted Townsend | 385 | 14.4 | +5.3 |
| Liberal Democrats | Krystian Belliere | 378 | 14.1 | +6.1 |
| Majority | | 416 | 15.6 | |
| Turnout | | | 34.77% | +2.7% |
| Conservative hold | | Swing | | |
| Conservative hold | | Swing | | |
| Conservative hold | | Swing | | |

=== North End ===
North End (3)
| Party | Candidate | Votes | % | ±% |
|---|---|---|---|---|
| Labour | Daryl Brown* | 1,944 | 65.6 | +16.9 |
| Labour | Larry Culhane* | 1,815 | 61.3 | +16.2 |
| Labour | Zarar Qayyum | 1,741 | 58.8 | +14.4 |
| Conservative | Sophie Richards | 702 | 23.7 | −16.1 |
| Conservative | Chris Glenny | 683 | 23.1 | −14.7 |
| Conservative | Saif Lone | 678 | 22.9 | −11.9 |
| Liberal Democrats | Gillian Barnes | 346 | 11.7 | +2.3 |
| Liberal Democrats | Sarah Taylor | 330 | 11.1 | +3.2 |
| Liberal Democrats | Meher Oliaji | 243 | 8.2 | +2.1 |
| UKIP | John Lodge | 71 | 2.4 | −4.9 |
| Majority | | 1039 | 35.1 | |
| Turnout | | | 37.94% | −1.5% |
| Labour hold | | Swing | | |
| Labour hold | | Swing | | |
| Labour hold | | Swing | | |

=== Palace Riverside ===
Palace Riverside (2)
| Party | Candidate | Votes | % | ±% |
|---|---|---|---|---|
| Conservative | Amanda Lloyd-Harris | 1,576 | 61.3 | +0.1 |
| Conservative | Donald Johnson* | 1,565 | 60.9 | −4.1 |
| Labour | Clare Clifford | 631 | 24.5 | +3.8 |
| Labour | Jacolyn Daly | 569 | 22.1 | +5.3 |
| Liberal Democrats | Tamara Dragadze | 363 | 14.1 | +6.7 |
| Liberal Democrats | Alexander Bradford | 349 | 13.6 | +7.0 |
| Majority | | 934 | 36.4 | |
| Turnout | | | 47.01% | +2.7% |
| Conservative hold | | Swing | | |
| Conservative hold | | Swing | | |

=== Parsons Green and Walham ===
Parsons Green and Walham (3)
| Party | Candidate | Votes | % | ±% |
|---|---|---|---|---|
| Conservative | Frances Stainton* | 1,800 | 63.2 | −1.7 |
| Conservative | Mark Loveday* | 1,771 | 62.2 | −0.9 |
| Conservative | Matt Thorley | 1,755 | 61.6 | −6.4 |
| Labour | Mary Smith | 612 | 21.5 | +2.7 |
| Labour | Stephen Naulls | 591 | 20.7 | +0.4 |
| Labour | Mahdi Pour Nezami | 561 | 19.7 | +1.9 |
| Liberal Democrats | Eithne Buchanan-Barrow | 420 | 14.7 | +4.2 |
| Liberal Democrats | Caroline Mason | 409 | 14.4 | +5.8 |
| Liberal Democrats | Tony Couldrey | 377 | 13.2 | +6.0 |
| Majority | | 1143 | 40.1 | |
| Turnout | | | 38.26% | +2.7% |
| Conservative hold | | Swing | | |
| Conservative hold | | Swing | | |
| Conservative hold | | Swing | | |

=== Ravenscourt Park ===
Ravenscourt Park (3)
| Party | Candidate | Votes | % | ±% |
|---|---|---|---|---|
| Labour | Jonathan Caleb-Landy | 1,834 | 45.9 | +6.1 |
| Labour | Bora Kwon | 1,768 | 44.2 | +8.7 |
| Labour | Asif Siddique | 1,752 | 43.8 | +8.8 |
| Conservative | Harry Phibbs* | 1,405 | 35.1 | −7.9 |
| Conservative | Lucy Ivimy* | 1,351 | 33.8 | −12.3 |
| Conservative | Mark Higton | 1,281 | 32.0 | −11.4 |
| Liberal Democrats | Henrietta Bewley | 815 | 20.4 | +11.8 |
| Liberal Democrats | Irina Von Wiese | 744 | 18.6 | +12.5 |
| Liberal Democrats | Alison Hancock | 741 | 18.5 | +12.5 |
| Majority | | 347 | 8.7 | |
| Turnout | | | 50.44% | +1.1% |
| Labour gain from Conservative | | Swing | | |
| Labour gain from Conservative | | Swing | | |
| Labour gain from Conservative | | Swing | | |

=== Sands End ===
Sands End (3)
| Party | Candidate | Votes | % | ±% |
|---|---|---|---|---|
| Labour | Lucy Richardson | 1,829 | 49.0 | +10.1 |
| Labour | Ann Rosenberg | 1,818 | 48.8 | +16.7 |
| Labour | Matt Uberoi | 1,714 | 46.0 | +14.5 |
| Conservative | Jackie Borland | 1,585 | 42.5 | +0.7 |
| Conservative | Steve Hamilton* | 1,500 | 40.2 | −2.4 |
| Conservative | Tom Martin | 1,484 | 39.8 | −0.8 |
| Liberal Democrats | Raymond Burnet | 342 | 9.2 | +2.1 |
| Liberal Democrats | Gerald Milch | 288 | 7.7 | +1.5 |
| Liberal Democrats | Justin Kandiah | 279 | 7.5 | +0.7 |
| Majority | | 129 | 3.5 | |
| Turnout | | | 39.41% | +6.8% |
| Labour gain from Conservative | | Swing | | |
| Labour gain from Conservative | | Swing | | |
| Labour gain from Conservative | | Swing | | |

=== Shepherds Bush Green ===
Shepherds Bush Green (3)
| Party | Candidate | Votes | % | ±% |
|---|---|---|---|---|
| Labour | Andrew Jones* | 2,050 | 68.4 | +9.2 |
| Labour | Natalie Perez* | 2,023 | 67.5 | +8.6 |
| Labour | Mercy Umeh* | 1,981 | 66.1 | +10.1 |
| Conservative | Charlotte Duthie | 555 | 18.5 | −3.0 |
| Conservative | Simon Hewitt | 533 | 17.8 | −2.4 |
| Conservative | Liane Pibworth | 471 | 15.7 | −2.8 |
| Liberal Democrats | Ralph Redfern | 319 | 10.6 | +2.0 |
| Liberal Democrats | Thomas Naylor | 307 | 10.2 | N/A |
| Liberal Democrats | Paul Buchanan-Barrow | 273 | 9.1 | N/A |
| Majority | | 1426 | 47.6 | |
| Turnout | | | 35.35% | +0.4% |
| Labour hold | | Swing | | |
| Labour hold | | Swing | | |
| Labour hold | | Swing | | |

=== Town ===
Town (3)
| Party | Candidate | Votes | % | ±% |
|---|---|---|---|---|
| Conservative | Victoria Brocklebank-Fowler | 1,567 | 48.0 | −4.4 |
| Conservative | Belinda Donovan~ | 1,508 | 46.2 | +0.1 |
| Conservative | Andrew Brown* | 1,480 | 45.3 | −5.5 |
| Labour | Nick Buckley | 1,354 | 41.5 | +17.2 |
| Labour | Helen Rowbottom | 1,339 | 41.0 | +17.1 |
| Labour | James Doheny | 1,255 | 38.4 | +16.5 |
| Liberal Democrats | Azi Ahmed | 328 | 10.0 | −10.1 |
| Liberal Democrats | Henry Bagwell | 328 | 10.0 | −9.2 |
| Liberal Democrats | Graham Muir | 323 | 9.9 | −4.7 |
| Majority | | 126 | 3.8 | |
| Turnout | | | 41.70% | +9.4% |
| Conservative hold | | Swing | | |
| Conservative hold | | Swing | | |
| Conservative hold | | Swing | | |

=== Wormholt and White City ===
Wormholt and White City (3)
| Party | Candidate | Votes | % | ±% |
|---|---|---|---|---|
| Labour | Colin Aherne* | 2,493 | 77.7 | +9.3 |
| Labour | Sue Macmillan* | 2,396 | 74.7 | +12.7 |
| Labour | Max Schmid* | 2,261 | 70.5 | +13.7 |
| Conservative | Nick Botterill | 473 | 14.7 | −2.8 |
| Conservative | James O'Donohoe | 450 | 14.0 | −2.4 |
| Conservative | Amir Sadjady | 404 | 12.6 | −3.0 |
| Liberal Democrats | Oscar Tapper | 242 | 7.5 | +2.2 |
| Liberal Democrats | Mark Anderson | 187 | 5.8 | N/A |
| Liberal Democrats | Stephen Morris | 172 | 5.4 | N/A |
| Independent | Jagdeo Hauzaree | 89 | 2.8 | N/A |
| Majority | | 1788 | 55.8 | |
| Turnout | | | 35.11% | −1.9% |
| Labour hold | | Swing | | |
| Labour hold | | Swing | | |
| Labour hold | | Swing | | |

== By-elections ==
=== Fulham Broadway ===
A by-election was held in Fulham Broadway after the resignation of Councillor Alan de'Ath on 19 September 2019.

Fulham Broadway: 19 September 2019
| Party | Candidate | Votes | % | ±% |
|---|---|---|---|---|
| Labour | Helen Rowbottom | 1,097 | 44.2 | −8.4 |
| Liberal Democrats | Jessie Venegas | 755 | 30.4 | +21.7 |
| Conservative | Aliya Afzal Khan | 628 | 25.3 | −8.8 |
| Majority | | 342 | 13.8 | |
| Turnout | | 2,480 | 31.7 | −6.0 |
| Labour hold | | Swing | | |

=== Wormholt & White City ===
A by-election was held in Wormholt & White City following the death of Councillor Colin Aherne on 11 July 2021.

Wormholt & White City: 23 September 2021
| Party | Candidate | Votes | % | ±% |
|---|---|---|---|---|
| Labour | Frances Umeh | 1,462 | 70.0 | −5.6 |
| Conservative | Constance Campbell | 431 | 20.6 | +6.3 |
| Green | Naranee Ruthra-Rajan | 110 | 5.3 | N/A |
| Liberal Democrats | Michael Illingworth | 86 | 4.1 | −3.2 |
| Majority | | 1,031 | 49.4 | |
| Turnout | | 2,089 | 22.6 | |
| Labour hold | | Swing | ▼6.0 | |
