= 2010 Hammersmith and Fulham London Borough Council election =

2010 local election in England

- 6 May 2010

All 46 seats to Hammersmith and Fulham London Borough Council 24 seats needed for a majority
- Turnout: 61.9% (▲22.2%)
	First party	Second party
Party	Conservative	Labour
Last election	33 seats, 48.2%	13 seats, 32.2%
Seats won	31	15
Seat change	▼2	▲2
Popular vote	34,229	27,118
Percentage	42.9%	34.0%
Swing	▼5.3%	▲1.8%
- Map of the results of the 2010 Hammersmith and Fulham council election. Conservatives in blue and Labour in red.
Council control before election
Conservative
Council control after election
Conservative

A map showing the wards of Hammersmith and Fulham since 2002

Elections for Hammersmith and Fulham Council in London were held on 6 May 2010. The 2010 United Kingdom General Election and other local elections took place on the same day.

In London council elections the entire council is elected every four years, as opposed to some local elections where one councillor is elected every year in three of the four years.

== Results ==
Hammersmith and Fulham Council election result 2010
Party	Seats	Gains	Losses	Net gain/loss	Seats %	Votes %	Votes	+/−
Conservative	31	0	2	-2	67%	44.6%	94,246	-5.8%
Labour	15	2	0	+2	33%	34.5%	72,896	+1.4%
Liberal Democrats	0	0	0	0	0%	20.0%	42229	+6.1%
Green	0	0	0	0	0%	0.7%	1500	+0.2%

After taking control four years previously at the last election, the Conservative Party maintained control – with just two seats changing hands.

== Ward results ==
The borough is divided into 16 electoral wards, all bar two electing three councillors apiece.

=== Addison ===
Addison (3)
Party	Candidate	Votes	%	±%
Conservative	Alex Chalk	2,320	42.6	
Conservative	Belinda Donovan *	2,226	40.9	
Conservative	Peter Tobias*	2,027	37.2	
Labour	Andrew Ellard	1,657	30.4	
Labour	Elizabeth Jones	1,632	30.0	
Labour	Melanie Smallman	1,572	28.8	
Liberal Democrats	Janet Burden	1,251	23.0	
Liberal Democrats	Sally Empson	1,169	21.5	
Liberal Democrats	John Sutton	829	15.2	
Green	Gareth Faull	653	12.0	
Turnout		5,449	64.1	
Conservative hold		Swing		
Conservative hold		Swing		
Conservative hold		Swing		

=== Askew ===
Askew (3)
Party	Candidate	Votes	%	±%
Labour	Caroline Needham	2,616	45.3	
Labour	Rory Vaughan *	2,346	40.6	
Labour	Lisa Homan *	2,304	39.9	
Liberal Democrats	Nathalie Bristow	1,749	30.3	
Liberal Democrats	Henrietta Bewley	1,675	29.0	
Conservative	John Howard	1,591	27.5	
Conservative	David Cann	1,570	27.2	
Liberal Democrats	Rob Easthope	1,362	23.6	
Conservative	Kayser Izard	1,302	22.5	
Turnout		5,775	62.9	
Labour hold		Swing		
Labour hold		Swing		
Labour hold		Swing		

=== Avonmore & Brook Green ===
Avonmore & Brook Green (3)
Party	Candidate	Votes	%	±%
Conservative	Helen Binmore	2,505	48.5	
Conservative	Joe Carlebach	2,243	43.4	
Conservative	Robert Iggulden *	2,192	42.4	
Labour	Chris Allen	1,534	29.7	
Labour	Dan Power	1,424	27.6	
Labour	Stephen Burke	1,402	27.1	
Liberal Democrats	Suzanna Harris	1,279	24.8	
Liberal Democrats	Rufus Impey	955	18.5	
Liberal Democrats	Thomas Miller	921	17.8	
Independent	Seraphina Gillard-Marshall	200	3.9	
Turnout		5,164	59.8	
Conservative hold		Swing		
Conservative hold		Swing		
Conservative hold		Swing		

=== College Park & Old Oak ===
College Park & Old Oak (2)
Party	Candidate	Votes	%	±%
Labour	Elaine Chumnery	1,718	53.9	
Labour	Wes Harcourt *	1,694	53.1	
Conservative	Tony Hennessy	716	22.5	
Conservative	Mark Higton	639	20.0	
Liberal Democrats	Meghan Jones	462	14.5	
Liberal Democrats	Dinti Batstone	411	12.9	
Green	Rollo Miles	267	8.4	
Independent	Stephen Brennan	102	3.2	
Turnout		3,189	58.2	
Labour hold		Swing		
Labour hold		Swing		

=== Fulham Broadway ===
Fulham Broadway (3)
Party	Candidate	Votes	%	±%
Conservative	Victoria Brocklebank-Fowler *	2,178	47.0	
Conservative	Rachel Ford *	2,131	46.0	
Conservative	Matt Thorley	2,007	43.3	
Labour	Tom Butler	1,369	29.6	
Labour	Tony Cash	1,311	28.3	
Labour	Charlie Napier	1,138	24.6	
Liberal Democrats	Laura Kennedy	876	18.9	
Liberal Democrats	Daniel Bassford	874	18.9	
Liberal Democrats	Brynn Binnell	813	17.7	
Turnout		4,632	59.3	
Conservative hold		Swing		
Conservative hold		Swing		
Conservative hold		Swing		

=== Fulham Reach ===
Fulham Reach (3)
Party	Candidate	Votes	%	±%
Conservative	Gavin Donovan *	2,177	43.7	
Conservative	Peter Graham	2,146	43.0	
Conservative	Andrew Johnson *	2,030	40.7	
Labour	Vivienne Lukey	1,806	36.2	
Labour	James Mills	1,790	35.9	
Labour	Jill Rathbone	1,679	33.7	
Liberal Democrats	Gillian Barnes	1,014	20.3	
Liberal Democrats	Lee Clements	817	16.4	
Liberal Democrats	Julie Perrin	772	15.5	
Turnout		4,985	62.3	
Conservative hold		Swing		
Conservative hold		Swing		
Conservative hold		Swing		

=== Hammersmith Broadway ===
Hammersmith Broadway (3)
Party	Candidate	Votes	%	±%
Labour	Stephen Cowan *	2,186	43.5	
Labour	Michael Cartwright *	2,177	43.3	
Labour	P Murphy	2,129	42.4	
Conservative	Chris Glenny	1,792	35.7	
Conservative	Robert Largan	1,665	33.1	
Conservative	Dan Large	1,614	32.1	
Liberal Democrats	Emma Defries	1,035	20.6	
Liberal Democrats	Ian Harris	953	19.0	
Liberal Democrats	Jonathan Thomas	783	15.6	
Turnout		5,024	61.0	
Labour hold		Swing		
Labour hold		Swing		
Labour hold		Swing		

=== Munster ===
Munster (3)
Party	Candidate	Votes	%	±%
Conservative	Michael Adam *	2,924	60.0	
Conservative	Adronie Alford *	2,792	57.3	
Conservative	Alex Karmel *	2,647	54.3	
Labour	William Hunter	902	18.5	
Liberal Democrats	Ian Priestner	890	18.3	
Liberal Democrats	Robert Smith	781	16.0	
Labour	Kadoo	747	15.3	
Labour	Simon Stanley	681	14.0	
Liberal Democrats	James Studd	663	13.6	
Green	Rupert Baker	580	11.9	
Turnout		4,874	61.4	
Conservative hold		Swing		
Conservative hold		Swing		
Conservative hold		Swing		

=== North End ===
North End (3)
Party	Candidate	Votes	%	±%
Conservative	Georgie Cooney	2,125	43.3	
Labour	Daryl Brown	1,987	40.5	
Conservative	Tom Crofts	1,979	40.4	
Conservative	Caroline Ffiske *	1,842	37.6	
Labour	Max Schmid	1,697	34.6	
Labour	Matt Turmaine	1,679	34.2	
Liberal Democrats	Robert Falkner	998	20.4	
Liberal Democrats	Patrick Mcveigh	810	16.5	
Liberal Democrats	Meher Oliaji	774	15.8	
Turnout		4,903	61.4	
Conservative hold		Swing		
Labour gain from Conservative		Swing		
Conservative hold		Swing		

=== Palace Riverside ===
Palace Riverside (2)
Party	Candidate	Votes	%	±%
Conservative	Donald Johnson *	2,459	62.5	
Conservative	Marcus Ginn	2,285	58.1	
Liberal Democrats	Rachel Buchan	856	21.8	
Liberal Democrats	Tamara Dragadze	758	19.3	
Labour	Frank Lukey	645	16.4	
Labour	Charlie Treloggan	530	13.5	
Turnout		3,935	69.4	
Conservative hold		Swing		
Conservative hold		Swing		

=== Parson's Green & Walham ===
Parson's Green & Walham (3)
Party	Candidate	Votes	%	±%
Conservative	Nick Botterill *	3,320	67.0	
Conservative	Frances Stainton *	3,036	61.3	
Conservative	Mark Loveday *	3,003	60.6	
Labour	Rob Homan	816	16.5	
Liberal Democrats	William Bagwell	766	15.5	
Liberal Democrats	Delia Gerson	763	15.4	
Liberal Democrats	Paul Buchanan-Barrow	682	13.8	
Labour	Joan Liburd	676	13.6	
Labour	Barrie Stead	561	11.3	
Turnout		4,955	64.1	
Conservative hold		Swing		
Conservative hold		Swing		
Conservative hold		Swing		

=== Ravenscourt Park ===
Ravenscourt Park (3)
Party	Candidate	Votes	%	±%
Conservative	Lucy Ivimy *	2,300	43.7	
Conservative	Charlie Dewhirst	2,143	40.7	
Conservative	Harry Phibbs *	2,107	40.0	
Labour	Olivia Bailey	1,855	35.3	
Labour	Nic Cobb	1,609	30.6	
Labour	Felicity Dennistoun	1,500	28.5	
Liberal Democrats	Michael Cook	1,247	23.7	
Liberal Democrats	Callum Goldstein	1,151	21.9	
Liberal Democrats	Margaret Goldstein	1,128	21.4	
Turnout		5,261	67.7	
Conservative hold		Swing		
Conservative hold		Swing		
Conservative hold		Swing		

=== Sands End ===
Sands End (3)
Party	Candidate	Votes	%	±%
Conservative	Ali De Lisle	2,547	49.9	
Conservative	Stephen Hamilton *	2,409	47.2	
Conservative	Jane Law*	2,361	46.3	
Labour	Brendan Bird	1,626	31.9	
Labour	Ron Lawrence	1,410	27.6	
Labour	Bryanna Patterson	1,290	25.3	
Liberal Democrats	Eithne Buchanan-Barrow	957	18.8	
Liberal Democrats	Reuben Gibbons	889	17.4	
Liberal Democrats	Allan Mckelvie	830	16.3	
Turnout		5,103	58.9	
Conservative hold		Swing		
Conservative hold		Swing		
Conservative hold		Swing		

=== Shepherd's Bush Green ===
Shepherd's Bush Green (3)
Party	Candidate	Votes	%	±%
Labour	Iain Coleman	2,389	47.0	
Labour	Andrew Jones	2,277	44.8	
Labour	Mercy Umeh *	2,275	44.8	
Conservative	Alex Evans	1,450	28.6	
Conservative	Andrew Macdonald	1,267	25.0	
Conservative	Liz St. Clair	1,184	23.3	
Liberal Democrats	Robert Lastman	1,113	21.9	
Liberal Democrats	Patricia Owen	1,023	20.1	
Liberal Democrats	Annik Lidou	900	17.7	
UKIP	Vanessa Crichton	192	3.8	
Turnout		5,078	59.7	
Labour hold		Swing		
Labour hold		Swing		
Labour gain from Conservative		Swing		

=== Town ===
Town (3)
Party	Candidate	Votes	%	±%
Conservative	Oliver Craig *	2,639	56.3	
Conservative	Stephen Greenhalgh*	2,548	54.4	
Conservative	Greg Smith *	2,399	51.2	
Liberal Democrats	Paul Kennedy	1,117	23.8	
Liberal Democrats	Henry Braund	989	21.1	
Labour	Ben Coleman	960	20.5	
Liberal Democrats	Graham Muir	886	18.9	
Labour	Oliver Cardigan	882	18.8	
Labour	Natalia Shepherd	837	17.9	
Turnout		4,688	61.0	
Conservative hold		Swing		
Conservative hold		Swing		
Conservative hold		Swing		

=== Wormholt & White City ===
Wormholt & White City (3)
Party	Candidate	Votes	%	±%
Labour	Jean Campbell *	3,052	58.4	
Labour	Colin Aherne *	2,971	56.8	
Labour	Sally Powell *	2,813	53.8	
Conservative	Robert Frew	1,186	22.7	
Conservative	Nini Adetuberu	1,152	22.0	
Conservative	Evan Cranfield	1,071	20.5	
Liberal Democrats	Mary Handover	843	16.1	
Liberal Democrats	Stephen Morris	727	13.9	
Liberal Democrats	Catherine Remy	723	13.8	
Turnout		5,229	61.0	
Labour hold		Swing		
Labour hold		Swing		
Labour hold		Swing		
