= Dean Russell =

British politician (born 1976)

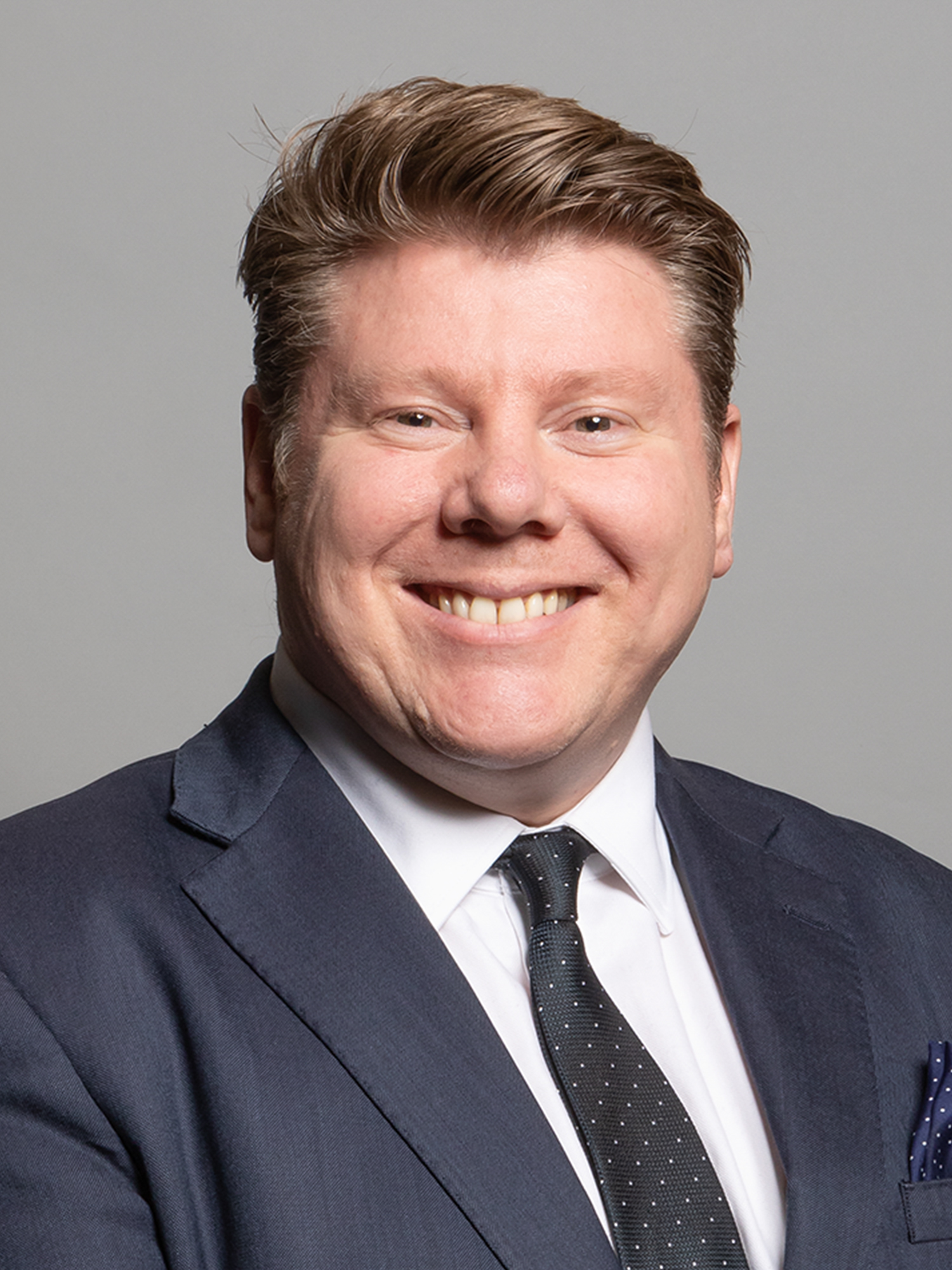
- Official portrait, 2020

Parliamentary Under-Secretary of State for Enterprise and Markets
- In office 20 September 2022 – 27 October 2022
- Prime Minister: Liz Truss
- Preceded by: Jane Hunt
- Succeeded by: Kevin Hollinrake

Member of Parliament for Watford
- In office 12 December 2019 – 30 May 2024
- Preceded by: Richard Harrington
- Succeeded by: Matt Turmaine

Personal details
- Born: 8 May 1976 (age 50) Birmingham, West Midlands, England
- Party: Conservative
- Education: De Montfort University
- Website: www.deanrussell.co.uk

Dean Russell FRSA (born 8 May 1976) is a British politician and author who was the Member of Parliament (MP) for Watford from the 2019 general election until the 2024 general election. A member of the Conservative Party, he served as Parliamentary Under-Secretary of State for Enterprise and Markets for 37 days in 2022.

== Early life and professional career ==
Dean Russell was born on 8 May 1976 in Birmingham and attended Park Hall School in Castle Bromwich. He later graduated with a BSc in Physics and Business Studies and an MPhil in Physics and Material Science at the former polytechnic De Montfort University. He then worked in marketing with Bluewave.

== Political career ==
At the 2015 general election, Russell stood in Luton North, coming second with 29.9% of the vote behind the incumbent Labour MP Kelvin Hopkins. He stood in Luton South at the snap 2017 general election, coming second with 32.3% of the vote behind the incumbent Labour MP Gavin Shuker.

Russell was elected to Parliament as MP for Watford at the 2019 general election with 45.5% of the vote and a majority of 4,433.

Since being elected, Russell has become a member of the Health & Social Care Select Committee and the Joint Committee on Human Rights. In October 2021, the Speaker of the House Sir Lindsay Hoyle appointed Russell as the Chair of the Speaker's Advisory Committee on Works of Art. In November 2021, he was appointed as Parliamentary Private Secretary (PPS) to the Foreign, Commonwealth & Development Office.

In June 2021, Russell presented the Tips Bill to Parliament. This bill would prohibit employers retaining tips and gratuities intended for staff and make provision about the division of tips and gratuities between staff. The bill was withdrawn before its Second Reading. In June 2022, after the Business Minister, Paul Scully, reassured Russell in Parliament that the UK Government would still support his bill, Russell presented the Employment (Allocation of Tips) Bill to Parliament. The bill was immediately granted a second reading in the House of Commons on 15 July 2022.

Between 2019 and 2021, Russell sat on the public committee during the committee stage of the Telecommunications (Security) Bill on its passage through the House of Commons. The Telecommunications (Security) Act 2021 was given royal assent on 17 November 2021.

On two separate occasions (March 2021 and January 2023) Russell has introduced a First-Aid (Mental Health) Bill under the Ten Minute Rule to make mental health first-aid part of first-aid training requirements in workplaces.

In the 2024 UK General Election, Russell was defeated by Labour's Matt Turmaine by 4,723 votes.

== Post-parliamentary career ==
Following his defeat at the 2024 UK General Election, Russell has worked as a freelance public speaker and Strategy & communications consultant.

== Personal life ==
He married Michelle in 2004 with whom he has a daughter.

In Prime Ministers Questions in January 2024, Russell shared how he had experienced a heart attack at the age of 47. He claims he recognised the symptoms due to his experience campaigning for the British Heart Foundation in 2009.

== Bibliography ==
Russell has written five books.

Year	Title	Publisher	ISBN
2013	Mouse and the Moon Made of Cheese	Far Far Away Books and Media	978-1-9087-8670-8
2013	So Frog	Far Far Away Books and Media	978-1-9087-8668-5
2013	So Gorilla	Far Far Away Books and Media	978-1-9087-8681-4
2013	Is Daddy Home Yet?	Far Far Away Books and Media	978-1-9087-8678-4
2019	How to Win: The Ultimate Professional Pitch Guide	Epifny Consulting	978-1-9996-0240-6

Parliament of the United Kingdom
Preceded by Richard Harrington	Member of Parliament for Watford; 2019–2024	Succeeded by Matt Turmaine
