= 2002 Hammersmith and Fulham London Borough Council election =

2002 local election in England

2002 Hammersmith and Fulham Borough Council election
- 2 May 2002

All 46 seats to Hammersmith and Fulham London Borough Council 24 seats needed for a majority
- Turnout: 32.0% (▼2.2%)

	First party	Second party
Party	Labour	Conservative
Last election	36 seats, 50.1%	14 seats, 36.8%
Seats won	28	18
Seat change	▼8	▲4
Popular vote	15,199	15,245
Percentage	41.5%	41.7%
Swing	▼8.6%	▲4.9%
- Map of the results of the 2002 Hammersmith and Fulham council election. Conservatives in blue and Labour in red.
Council control before election
Labour
Council control after election
Labour

A map showing the wards of Hammersmith and Fulham since 2002

The 2002 Hammersmith and Fulham Council election took place on 2 May 2002 to elect members of Hammersmith and Fulham London Borough Council in London, England. The whole council was up for election and the Labour party stayed in overall control of the council, despite winning fewer votes than the Conservative party.

== Background ==
This was the first set of council election using new ward boundaries - a majority of which were three seaters. The total number of council seats was reduced from 50 to 46.

== Election result ==
The Labour Party won 28 seats (on a 41.0% share of the vote) - 8 fewer seats than at previous election (on a loss of 8.7% of the vote), and maintained control of the council. The Conservative Party won 18 seats (with 42.5% of the vote) - 4 more seats than their previous result (increasing their vote share by 4.9%) The Liberal Democrats did not win any seats, and polled 14.1% of the votes cast - an increase of 1.5%.

== Ward results ==
=== Addison ===
Addison (3)
Party	Candidate	Votes	%	±%
Labour	Siobhan Coughlan	1,058	45.3%	
Labour	Ghassan Karian	946		
Labour	Melanie Smallman	937		
Conservative	Belinda Donovan	911	39.0%	
Conservative	James Browne	897		
Conservative	Donal Blaney	886		
Liberal Democrats	Rosemary Pettit	369	15.8%	
Liberal Democrats	Lucien Bowater	341		
Liberal Democrats	John Sutton	309		

=== Askew ===
Askew (3)
Party	Candidate	Votes	%	±%
Labour	Christine Graham	1,246	52.6%	
Labour	Josephine Wicks	1,056		
Labour	Timothy Stanley	1,021		
Liberal Democrats	Julie Perrin	465	19.6%	
Conservative	Sally Roberts	420	17.7%	
Conservative	Dowglass Cardale	391		
Conservative	Robert Watson	371		
Liberal Democrats	Graham Broomfield	369		
Liberal Democrats	Timothy Ocock	350		
Socialist Alliance	Fionntan Macdermott	130	5.5%	
Independent	Herbert Schouwenburg	108	4.6%	

=== Avonmore and Brook Green ===
Avonmore and Brook Green (3)
Party	Candidate	Votes	%	±%
Conservative	William Bethell	1,240	40.6%	
Conservative	Sian Dawson	1,214		
Conservative	Jolyon Neubert	1,151		
Labour	Daryl Brown	1112	36.4%	
Labour	Julian Hillman	964		
Labour	Simon Stanley	952		
Liberal Democrats	Norsheen Bhatti	375	12.3%	
Liberal Democrats	Anthony Wattsvotes= 349			
Independent	Keith Mallinson	327	10.7%	

=== College Park and Old Oak ===
College Park and Old Oak (2)
Party	Candidate	Votes	%	±%
Labour	Wes Harcourt	726	65.9%	
Labour	Reginald McLaughlin	715		
Liberal Democrats	Ian Halliday	206	18.7%	
Conservative	Emma Farquharson	170	15.4%	
Liberal Democrats	Tomothy Pollard	170		
Conservative	Gerald Spencer-Smith	158		

=== Fulham Broadway ===
Fulham Broadway (3)
Party	Candidate	Votes	%	±%
Labour	Andrew Jones	1,276	47.4%	
Labour	Dominic Church	1,253		
Labour	Charles Napier	1,217		
Conservative	Jonathan Collett	1183	43.9%	
Conservative	Emma Swann	1169		
Conservative	Thomas Kenyon	1166		
Liberal Democrats	Margaret Miller	233	8.7%	
Liberal Democrats	Robert Falkner	188		
Liberal Democrats	Rowland Mynors	165		

=== Fulham Reach ===
Fulham Reach (3)
Party	Candidate	Votes	%	±%
Conservative	Charles Boyle	1,102	42.7%	
Labour	Araminta Birdsey	1,095	42.4%	
Conservative	Charles Donovan	1,094		
Conservative	Victoria Harper	1069		
Labour	Lisa Homan	1051		
Labour	Rory Vaughan	1011		
Liberal Democrats	Duncan Campbell	285	11.0%	
Liberal Democrats	Marytka Jablkowska	269		
Liberal Democrats	Martin Ruston	228		
Independent	Christian Braun	99	3.8%	

=== Hammersmith Broadway ===
Hammersmith Broadway (3)
Party	Candidate	Votes	%	±%
Labour	Huw Davies	1,061	51.3%	
Labour	Kenneth Cartwright	1,041		
Labour	Stephen Cowan	1,016		
Conservative	Tara Douglas-Home	562	27.2%	
Conservative	Hannah Parker	531		
Conservative	Nick Hillman	528		
Liberal Democrats	Sophie Sainty	380	18.4%	
Liberal Democrats	George Collie	373		
Liberal Democrats	Samuel Le Rougetel	318		
UKIP	Andrew Lawrie	64	3.1%	
UKIP	Gerald Roberts	52		

=== Munster ===
Munster (3)
Party	Candidate	Votes	%	±%
Conservative	Michael Adam	1,232	61.4%	
Conservative	Adronie Alford	1,197		
Conservative	Alexander Karmel	1,168		
Labour	Andreene Eaton	535	26.7%	
Labour	Simon Pearson	532		
Labour	John Grigg	518		
Liberal Democrats	Diane Muir	239	11.9%	
Liberal Democrats	Alastair Brett	231		
Liberal Democrats	Gary Mann	193		

=== North End ===
North End (3)
Party	Candidate	Votes	%	±%
Labour	David Williams	1,159	45.2%	
Labour	Charles Treloggan	1,136		
Labour	Andy Slaughter	1,127		
Conservative	Nick Boys Smith	1013	39.5%	
Conservative	Mark Vickers	993		
Conservative	Michael Woods	964		
Liberal Democrats	Kishwer Falkner	264	10.3%	
Liberal Democrats	Suzanna Harris	262		
Liberal Democrats	Pepita Diamand-Levy	217		
Socialist Alliance	George Colerick	63	2.5%	
Socialist Labour	Linda Sheridan	63	2.5%	

=== Palace Riverside ===
Palace Riverside (2)
Party	Candidate	Votes	%	±%
Conservative	Amanda Lloyd-Harris	1,455	66.5%	
Conservative	Emile Al-Uzaizi	1,416		
Labour	John Leaver	443	20.3%	
Labour	Winifred Watson	393		
Liberal Democrats	Hector Macdonald	289	13.2%	
Liberal Democrats	Stephen Morris	219		

=== Parsons Green and Walham ===
Parsons Green and Walham (3)
Party	Candidate	Votes	%	±%
Conservative	Mark Loveday	1,710	71.3%	
Conservative	Nicholas Botterill	1,704		
Conservative	Frances Stainton	1,696		
Labour	Katherine Dunne	409	17.0%	
Labour	Michele Carlisle	403		
Labour	Francis Lukey	389		
Liberal Democrats	William Bagwell	280	11.7%	
Liberal Democrats	Shahina McKelvie	272		
Liberal Democrats	Jonathan Brock	257		

=== Ravenscourt Park ===
Ravenscourt Park (3)
Party	Candidate	Votes	%	±%
Labour	Christopher Allen	1,177	37.4%	
Conservative	Caroline Donald	1,131	36.0%	
Labour	Fiona Evans-Lothian	1,128		
Conservative	Huw Merriman	1107		
Labour	Gregory Jackson	1102		
Conservative	Joseph Miles	1087		
Liberal Democrats	Margaret Goldstein	838	26.6%	
Liberal Democrats	Jon Burden	832		
Liberal Democrats	Katharine Poll	828		

=== Sands End ===
Sands End (3)
Party	Candidate	Votes	%	±%
Labour	Brendan Bird	1,257	49.2%	
Labour	Jenny Vaughan	1,130		
Conservative	Stephen Hamilton	1,114	43.6%	
Labour	Colin Pavelin	1111		
Conservative	Mark Holdsworth	1061		
Conservative	Karen Woods	1058		
Liberal Democrats	Peter Hartwell	182	7.1%	
Liberal Democrats	Thierry Mercadier	174		
Liberal Democrats	Allan McKelvie	158		

=== Shepherds Bush Green ===
Shepherds Bush Green (3)
Party	Candidate	Votes	%	±%
Labour	Ivan Gibbons	985	54.0%	
Labour	Abu Khaled	908		
Labour	Mercy Umeh	785		
Conservative	Nicola Burns-Thomson	475	26.0%	
Conservative	Anna Harvey	467		
Conservative	Bob Seely	447		
Liberal Democrats	Particia Owen	365	20.0%	
Liberal Democrats	Michael Andrew	342		
Liberal Democrats	Colquitto McDonnell	322		

=== Town ===
Town (3)
Party	Candidate	Votes	%	±%
Conservative	Greg Hands	1,161	60.3%	
Conservative	Stephen Greenhalgh	1,155		
Conservative	Antony Lillis	1,108		
Labour	Jeremy Fordham	519	27.0%	
Labour	Howard Dawber	468		
Labour	John Rham	396		
Liberal Democrats	Henry Braund	245	12.7%	
Liberal Democrats	Michael Cloney	242		
Liberal Democrats	Graham Muir	225		

=== Wormholt and White City ===
Wormholt and White City (3)
Party	Candidate	Votes	%	±%
Labour	Colin Aherne	1,141	63.5%	
Labour	Sally Powell	1,084		
Labour	Stephen Burke	1,082		
Conservative	Sean Donovan-Smith	366	20.4%	
Conservative	Grace Oliver	337		
Liberal Democrats	Paul Morrison	289	16.1%	
Liberal Democrats	David Spencer	279		
Conservative	Arunasalam Yogeswaran	272		
Liberal Democrats	Richard Eze	242		
