= 2014 Hammersmith and Fulham London Borough Council election =

2014 local election in England

2014 Hammersmith and Fulham Borough Council election
- 22 May 2014

All 46 seats to Hammersmith and Fulham London Borough Council 24 seats needed for a majority
- Turnout: 37.6% (▼24.3%

	First party	Second party
Party	Labour	Conservative
Last election	15 seats, 34.0%	31 seats, 42.9%
Seats won	26	20
Seat change	▲11	▼11
Popular vote	22,025	19,763
Percentage	42.2%	37.9%
Swing	▲8.2%	▼5.0%
- Map of the results of the 2014 Hammersmith and Fulham council election. Conservatives in blue and Labour in red.
Council control before election
Conservative
Council control after election
Labour

A map showing the wards of Hammersmith and Fulham since 2002

The 2014 Hammersmith and Fulham Council election took place on 22 May 2014 to elect members of Hammersmith and Fulham Council in England. This was on the same day as other local elections.

== Overall Results ==
Hammersmith and Fulham London Borough Council

Structure
- Seats: 46 councillors
- Political groups: Majority Party (26): Labour (26); Opposition (20): Conservative (20)

After eight years of Conservative administration, the Labour Party took back control of the council.

Hammersmith and Fulham Council election result 2014
Party	Seats	Gains	Losses	Net gain/loss	Seats %	Votes %	Votes	+/−
Labour	26			▲11		41.9	60,651	▲7.8
Conservative	20		▼11			38.1	54,737	▼5.3
Liberal Democrats	0	0	0	0		8.4		▼11.4
Green	0	0	0	0		6.6		
UKIP	0	0	0	0		3.9		

== Ward results ==
=== Addison ===
Addison (3)
Party	Candidate	Votes	%	±%
Labour	Adam Connell	1,731	47.8	+17.4
Labour	Sue Fennimore	1,702	47.0	+17.0
Conservative	Belinda Donovan	1,609	44.4	+3.5
Conservative	Joe Cawley	1,511	41.7	−0.9
Conservative	Charles Forsyth	1,511	41.7	+4.5
Labour	Khafi Khareem	1,499	41.4	+12.6
Liberal Democrats	Janet Burden	504	13.9	−9.1
Majority		98	2.7	
Turnout			42.9	−21.2
Labour gain from Conservative		Swing		
Labour gain from Conservative		Swing		
Conservative hold		Swing		

=== Askew ===
Askew (3)
Party	Candidate	Votes	%	±%
Labour	Caroline Needham	2,208	60.2	+14.9
Labour	Lisa Homan	1,976	53.8	+13.9
Labour	Rory Vaughan	1,884	51.3	+10.7
Conservative	Mark Higton	891	24.3	−3.2
Conservative	George Pender	778	21.2	−6.0
Green	Helene Albrecht	765	20.8	N/A
Conservative	Harry Spencer Smith	752	20.5	−2.0
Liberal Democrats	Penny Coates	357	9.7	−20.6
Liberal Democrats	Catherine Remy	264	7.2	−21.8
Liberal Democrats	Julie Perrin	244	6.6	−17.0
Independent	Bozidar Zabavnik	58	1.6	N/A
Majority		993	27.0	
Turnout			36.97	
Labour hold		Swing		
Labour hold		Swing		
Labour hold		Swing		

=== Avonmore and Brook Green ===
Avonmore and Brook Green (3)
Party	Candidate	Votes	%	±%
Conservative	Joe Carlebach	1,403	44.5	+1.1
Labour	Hannah Barlow	1,375	43.6	+13.9
Conservative	Caroline Ffiske	1,337	42.4	−6.1
Conservative	Henrietta Malet	1,289	40.9	−1.5
Labour	Michael O'Sullivan	1,237	39.2	+11.6
Labour	Zarar Qayyum	1,148	36.4	+9.3
Liberal Democrats	Poppy Swallow	299	9.5	−15.3
Liberal Democrats	Jon Burden	297	9.4	−9.1
Liberal Democrats	Billy Dann	274	8.7	−9.1
UKIP	Dominic Spencer	220	7.0	N/A
Majority		48	1.5	
Turnout			36.89	
Conservative hold		Swing		
Labour gain from Conservative		Swing		
Conservative hold		Swing		

=== College Park and Old Oak ===
College Park and Old Oak (2)
Party	Candidate	Votes	%	±%
Labour	Elaine Chumnery	1,245	63.6	+9.7
Labour	Wesley Harcourt	1,155	59.0	+5.9
Conservative	Gavin Donovan	407	20.8	−1.7
Green	Jurgen Huber	345	17.6	+9.2
Conservative	Maria Sturdy-Morton	333	17.0	−3.0
Liberal Democrats	Visuddha Bowatte	145	7.4	−7.1
Majority		748	38.2	
Turnout			31.74	
Labour hold		Swing		
Labour hold		Swing		

=== Fulham Broadway ===
Fulham Broadway (3)
Party	Candidate	Votes	%	±%
Labour	Ben Coleman	1,571	50.3	+20.7
Labour	Sharon Holder	1,540	49.3	+21.0
Labour	Alan De'Ath	1,524	48.8	+24.2
Conservative	Victoria Brocklebank-Fowler	1,252	40.1	−6.9
Conservative	Rachel Ford	1,232	39.4	−6.6
Conservative	Matt Thorley	1,211	38.7	−4.6
Liberal Democrats	Laura Kennedy	218	7.0	−11.9
Liberal Democrats	Harry Braund	217	6.9	−12.0
Liberal Democrats	Molly Waiting	188	6.0	−11.7
Majority		272	8.7	
Turnout			39.36	
Labour gain from Conservative		Swing		
Labour gain from Conservative		Swing		
Labour gain from Conservative		Swing		

=== Fulham Reach ===
Fulham Reach (3)
Party	Candidate	Votes	%	±%
Labour	Iain Cassidy	1,633	46.5	+10.6
Labour	Vivienne Lukey	1,623	46.2	+10.0
Labour	Guy Vincent	1,517	43.2	+9.5
Conservative	Peter Graham	1,496	42.6	−0.4
Conservative	Andrew Johnson	1,453	41.3	+0.6
Conservative	Tish Glossop	1,434	40.8	−2.9
UKIP	John Lodge	275	7.8	N/A
Liberal Democrats	Christine Longworth	265	7.5	−12.8
Liberal Democrats	Allan McKelvie	182	5.2	−11.2
Liberal Democrats	Chris Waiting	164	4.7	−10.8
Majority		21	0.6	
Turnout			41.73	
Labour gain from Conservative		Swing		
Labour gain from Conservative		Swing		
Labour gain from Conservative		Swing		

=== Hammersmith Broadway ===
Hammersmith Broadway (3)
Party	Candidate	Votes	%	±%
Labour	PJ Murphy	1,710	53.6	+11.2
Labour	Stephen Cowan	1,709	53.6	+10.1
Labour	Michael Cartwright	1,695	53.1	+9.8
Conservative	Jackie Borland	935	29.3	−6.4
Conservative	Azi Ahmed	810	25.4	−7.7
Conservative	Jamie McKittrick	799	25.0	−7.1
UKIP	David Broad	339	10.6	N/A
Liberal Democrats	Nigel Orchard	307	9.6	−11.0
Liberal Democrats	Paul Hinds	279	8.7	−10.3
Liberal Democrats	Barry Sutton	240	7.5	−8.1
TUSC	Roy Carey	107	3.4	N/A
Majority		760	23.8	
Turnout			37.00	
Labour hold		Swing		
Labour hold		Swing		
Labour hold		Swing		

=== Munster ===
Munster (3)
Party	Candidate	Votes	%	±%
Conservative	Michael Adam	1,498	58.1	−1.9
Conservative	Adronie Alford	1,436	55.7	−1.6
Conservative	Alex Karmel	1,412	54.7	+0.4
Labour	Rachel Leighton	667	25.9	+7.4
Labour	Frank Lukey	601	23.3	+8.0
Labour	Matt Parsons	536	20.8	+6.8
NHA	Dede Wilson	301	11.7	N/A
Liberal Democrats	Kathy Kennedy	244	9.5	−8.8
Liberal Democrats	Sabine Adotevi	235	9.1	−6.9
Liberal Democrats	Simone Orlean	207	8.0	−5.6
Majority		755	28.8	
Turnout			32.09	
Conservative hold		Swing		
Conservative hold		Swing		
Conservative hold		Swing		

=== North End ===
North End (3)
Party	Candidate	Votes	%	±%
Labour	Daryl Brown	1,573	48.7	+8.2
Labour	Larry Culhane	1,456	45.1	+10.5
Labour	Ali Hashem	1,434	44.4	+10.2
Conservative	Tom Crofts	1,285	39.8	−0.6
Conservative	Tamara Jackson	1,219	37.8	−5.5
Conservative	Nabil Najjar	1,123	34.8	−2.8
Liberal Democrats	Gillian Barnes	302	9.4	−11.0
Liberal Democrats	Sarah Taylor	254	7.9	−8.6
UKIP	Andy Elston	235	7.3	N/A
Liberal Democrats	Robert Falkner	197	6.1	−9.7
Majority		149	4.6	
Turnout			39.40	
Labour gain from Conservative		Swing		
Labour hold		Swing		
Labour gain from Conservative		Swing		

=== Palace Riverside ===
Palace Riverside (2)
Party	Candidate	Votes	%	±%
Conservative	Donald Johnson	1,593	65.0	+2.5
Conservative	Marcus Ginn	1,500	61.2	+3.1
Labour	Debbie Domb	507	20.7	+4.3
Labour	Sean Morris	412	16.8	+3.3
Green	Amanda Burton	324	13.2	N/A
Liberal Democrats	Tamara Dragadze	182	7.4	−11.9
Liberal Democrats	Dan Bassford	163	6.6	−15.2
Majority		993	40.5	
Turnout			44.28	
Conservative hold		Swing		
Conservative hold		Swing		

=== Parsons Green and Walham ===
Parsons Green and Walham (3)
Party	Candidate	Votes	%	±%
Conservative	Nick Botterill	1,853	68.0	+1.0
Conservative	Frances Stainton	1,767	64.9	+3.6
Conservative	Mark Loveday	1,719	63.1	+2.5
Labour	Alan Aitken	553	20.3	+3.8
Labour	Mary Smith	511	18.8	+5.2
Labour	Sid Sidu	486	17.8	+6.5
Liberal Democrats	Alexandra Kennedy	287	10.5	−5.0
Liberal Democrats	Paul Buchanan-Barrow	233	8.6	−5.2
Liberal Democrats	Alun Smith	197	7.2	−8.2
Majority		1,166	42.8	
Turnout			35.48	
Conservative hold		Swing		
Conservative hold		Swing		
Conservative hold		Swing		

=== Ravenscourt Park ===
Ravenscourt Park (3)
Party	Candidate	Votes	%	±%
Conservative	Lucy Ivimy	1,724	46.1	+2.4
Conservative	Charlie Dewhirst	1,621	43.4	+2.7
Conservative	Harry Phibbs	1,608	43.0	+3.0
Labour	Jasmine Pilgrem	1,489	39.8	+4.5
Labour	Alexandra Sanderson	1,329	35.5	+4.9
Labour	Rowan Ree	1,310	35.0	+6.5
Green	David Akan	523	14.0	N/A
Liberal Democrats	Simon Bailey	322	8.6	−15.1
Liberal Democrats	Ian Harris	228	6.1	−15.8
Liberal Democrats	Thomas Miller	224	6.0	−15.4
UKIP	Jim Wainwright	192	5.1	N/A
Majority		119	3.2	
Turnout			49.30	
Conservative hold		Swing		
Conservative hold		Swing		
Conservative hold		Swing		

=== Sands End ===
Sands End (3)
Party	Candidate	Votes	%	±%
Conservative	Steve Hamilton	1,263	42.6	−4.6
Conservative	Jane Law	1,239	41.8	−4.5
Conservative	Robert Largan	1,206	40.6	−9.3
Labour	Brendan Bird	1,153	38.9	+7.0
Labour	Dan Murphy	951	32.1	+4.5
Labour	Izzy Westbury	934	31.5	+6.2
UKIP	Christopher Bick	383	12.9	N/A
Green	Max Lock	344	11.6	N/A
Liberal Democrats	Joel Kenrick	210	7.1	−10.3
Liberal Democrats	Eithne Buchanan-Barrow	202	6.8	−12.0
Liberal Democrats	Gerald Milch	183	6.2	−10.1
Majority		53	1.7	
Turnout			32.59	
Conservative hold		Swing		
Conservative hold		Swing		
Conservative hold		Swing		

=== Shepherds Bush Green ===
Shepherds Bush Green (3)
Party	Candidate	Votes	%	±%
Labour	Andrew Jones	1,765	59.2	+14.4
Labour	Natalie Perez Shepherd	1,756	58.9	+11.9
Labour	Mercy Umeh	1,669	56.0	+11.2
Conservative	Daniela Becher	642	21.5	−7.1
Conservative	William Marshall	602	20.2	−4.8
Green	Archie Thomas	578	19.4	N/A
Conservative	Dominic Stanton	552	18.5	−4.8
UKIP	Vanessa Crichton	282	9.5	+5.7
Liberal Democrats	Meher Oliaji	256	8.6	−13.3
Majority		1,027	34.5	
Turnout			34.93	
Labour hold		Swing		
Labour hold		Swing		
Labour hold		Swing		

=== Town ===
Town (3)
Party	Candidate	Votes	%	±%
Conservative	Greg Smith	1,342	52.4	+1.2
Conservative	Andrew Brown	1,301	50.8	−5.5
Conservative	Viya Nsumbu	1,181	46.1	−8.3
Labour	Nicholas Cobb	623	24.3	+3.8
Labour	Sara Ibrahim	611	23.9	+5.1
Labour	John Grigg	562	21.9	+4.0
Liberal Democrats	Paul Kennedy	516	20.1	−3.7
Liberal Democrats	Elizabeth Daly	492	19.2	−1.9
Liberal Democrats	Graham Muir	373	14.6	−4.3
TUSC	Joanne Harris	118	4.6	N/A
Majority		558	21.8	
Turnout			32.33	
Conservative hold		Swing		
Conservative hold		Swing		
Conservative hold		Swing		

=== Wormholt and White City ===
Wormholt and White City (3)
Party	Candidate	Votes	%	±%
Labour	Colin Aherne	2,222	68.4	+11.6
Labour	Sue Macmillan	2,014	62.0	+3.6
Labour	Max Schmid	1,845	56.8	+3.0
Conservative	Robert Flint	570	17.5	−5.2
Conservative	Tim Hughes	532	16.4	−5.6
Conservative	Louisa Townson	506	15.6	−4.9
Green	Antony Fox	370	11.4	N/A
Liberal Democrats	David Burridge	171	5.3	−10.8
Majority		1,275	39.3	
Turnout			36.96	
Labour hold		Swing		
Labour hold		Swing		
Labour hold		Swing		
