= Robert Falkner =

British political scientist (born 1967)

Robert Falkner (born 6 April 1967) is Professor of International Relations at the London School of Economics and Political Science (LSE). He is the Academic Dean of the TRIUM Global Executive MBA, an executive MBA programme jointly run by NYU Stern School of Business, HEC Paris and LSE. He is a Distinguished Fellow of the Munk School of Global Affairs and Public Policy at the University of Toronto.

== Early life and education ==
Falkner was born in Germany and read for a double degree in political science and economics at LMU Munich. After moving to the UK, he received his doctorate in international relations at Nuffield College, University of Oxford.

== Career ==
Before joining LSE in 2002, he held academic positions at the universities of Oxford, Kent and Essex. From 2000 to 2020, he was an Associate Fellow of the Energy, Environment & Development Programme at Chatham House. From 2006 to 2007, he was a visiting scholar at Harvard University's Minda de Gunzburg Center for European Studies. From 2008 to 2009, he led an international research consortium that produced a major comparative study of nanotechnologies regulation in Europe and the US. From 2015 to 2017, he was the Academic Co-Director of the Dahrendorf Forum, a joint research and public engagement programme between LSE, Hertie School of Governance and Stiftung Mercator. From 2017 to 2022, he was the Research Director of the Grantham Research Institute on Climate Change and the Environment at LSE. In 2023, he was a Simone Veil Fellow at LMU Munich.

== Research ==
His research and teaching focuses on global environmental politics and international political economy. He has published widely on international climate policy, business power in international relations, emerging technologies and their regulation, and the role of international norms and institutions in global governance. In an interview with E-International Relations, he explained his engagement with English School theory as part of his recent focus on "broader questions of how environmental change and the long-term development of international society are interconnected."

He was an associate editor of the European Journal of International Relations from 2004 to 2008. He now serves on the editorial boards of the journals Earth System Governance, Global Environmental Politics and Global Policy.

His article "Private Environmental Governance and International Relations: exploring the links" (Global Environmental Politics 3:2, 2003), was included in the list of 50 influential journal articles published in MIT Press journals, in honour of the Press’ 50th anniversary in 2012. His paper (co-authored with Barry Buzan) "The Emergence of Environmental Stewardship as a Primary Institution of Global International Society", which was first presented at the ISA 2017 conference, won the ISA English School Section’s Outstanding Research Paper in the ‘Senior Scholar’ category.

On 9 June 2025, he gave the Martin Wight Memorial Lecture on "Economic Nationalism and Global (Dis)Order" at LSE.

He has given evidence to the UK Parliament on questions of international climate policy and nanotechnologies regulation, and frequently comments on international environmental policy in international media.

== Personal life ==
He is married to Kishwer Falkner, who is a member of the House of Lords.

== Publications ==
- Green Political Economy (Polity Press, 2026).
- The Market and Global International Society. An English School Approach to International Political Economy (Oxford University Press, 2025), with Barry Buzan.
- Great Powers, Climate Change and Global Environmental Responsibilities (Oxford University Press, 2022), co-edited with Barry Buzan.
- Environmentalism and Global International Society (Cambridge University Press, 2021).
- The Handbook of Global Climate and Environment Policy (Wiley-Blackwell, 2013), edited.
- Business Power and Conflict in International Environmental Politics (Palgrave Macmillan, 2008).
- The International Politics of Genetically Modified Food: Diplomacy, Trade and Law (Palgrave Macmillan, 2007), edited.
- The Cartagena Protocol on Biosafety: Reconciling Trade in Biotechnology with Environment and Development? (Chatham House/Earthscan), co-edited with Christoph Bail and Helen Marquard.
