= Hammersmith and Fulham London Borough Council elections =

English local election

A map showing the wards of Hammersmith and Fulham from 2002 until 2022

Hammersmith and Fulham London Borough Council is the local authority for the London Borough of Hammersmith and Fulham in London, England. The council is elected every four years.

== Council elections ==
Year	Labour	Conservative	Liberal Democrats (Note: Liberal Party, 1964–1978; SDP–Liberal Alliance, 1982–1986.)	Council control after election
Local government reorganisation; council established (60 seats)
1964	53	7	0	Labour
1968	6	54	0	Conservative
1971	58	2	0	Labour
1974	48	10	2	Labour
New division boundaries; seats decreased from 60 to 50
1978	24	24	2	No overall control
1982	25	23	2	No overall control
1986	40	9	1	Labour
1990	28	22	0	Labour
New division boundaries; seat count remains at 50 (Note: The Ealing, Hammersmith and Fulham, and Hounslow (London Borough Boundaries) Order 1993)
1994	33	15	2	Labour
New division boundaries; seat count remains at 50 (Note: The Kensington and Chelsea and Hammersmith and Fulham (London Borough Boundaries) Order 1995)
1998	36	14	0	Labour
New division boundaries; seats decreased from 50 to 46
2002	28	18	0	Labour
2006	13	33	0	Conservative
2010	15	31	0	Conservative
2014	26	20	0	Labour
2018	35	11	0	Labour
New division boundaries; seats increased from 46 to 50
2022	40	10	0	Labour
2026	38	12	0	Labour

=== Result maps ===
1978 results map

1982 results map

1986 results map

1990 results map

1994 results map

1998 results map

2002 results map

2006 results map

2010 results map

2014 results map

2018 results map

2022 results map

2026 results map

== By-election results ==
=== 1964-1968 ===
There were no by-elections.

=== 1968-1971 ===
Starch Green by-election, 27 June 1968
Party	Candidate	Votes	%	±%
Conservative	V. C. Dessimone	1018		
Labour	R. Johnson	651		
Turnout			26.5%	

White City by-election, 7 November 1968
Party	Candidate	Votes	%	±%
Labour	C. J. Liardet	908		
Conservative	G. W. Brierley	350		
Liberal	V. E. K. Coombes	258		
Independent	A. A. Ingram	72		
Communist	J. Gould	54		
Turnout			26.3%	

St Stephens by-election, 6 February 1969
Party	Candidate	Votes	%	±%
Conservative	W. H. Wearmouth	698		
Labour	L. S. A. Jones	558		
Turnout			25.3%	

=== 1971-1974 ===
There were no by-elections.

=== 1974-1978 ===
Colehill by-election, 12 September 1974
Party	Candidate	Votes	%	±%
Labour	William J. Stephens	963		
Conservative	Desmond J. Colling	573		
Liberal	George K. Williams	264		
Turnout			45.6	

Sandford by-election, 2 October 1975
Party	Candidate	Votes	%	±%
Labour	Joseph U. Feely	945		
Conservative	Reginald D. Lapham	622		
Liberal	Helen I. Bird	179		
Turnout			28.4	

Wormholt by-election, 20 November 1975
Party	Candidate	Votes	%	±%
Labour	Mary S. Best	735		
Conservative	John Barnes	608		
Liberal	Margaret A. Connaughton	530		
Turnout			34.4	

Addison by-election, 1 April 1976
Party	Candidate	Votes	%	±%
Labour	Edward D. Cunningham	999		
Conservative	Frances E. Belsham	969		
Conservative	Christopher G. Thorne	920		
Labour	John H. Gorter	915		
Liberal	Robert C. Bowles	192		
Liberal	Angela T. Rooney	148		
Turnout			41.0	

Town by-election, 13 May 1976
Party	Candidate	Votes	%	±%
Conservative	Fiona A. McGregor	1,550		
Labour	Rosemary A. Radcliffe	1,054		
Liberal	Anthony Hulse	110		
Turnout			52.4	

=== 1990-1994 ===
Eel Brook by-election, 9 April 1992
Party	Candidate	Votes	%	±%
Conservative	Alexander P. Karmel	1,387	48.6	
Labour	Valerie A. E. Barker	944	33.1	
Lib Dem Focus Team	Alexandra E. Sugden	426	14.9	
Green	Gervase J. Thorpe	95	3.3	
Turnout			77.1	
Conservative hold		Swing		

The by-election was called following the resignation of Cllr Andrew Robathan.

Broadway by-election, 16 July 1992
Party	Candidate	Votes	%	±%
Labour	Kenneth M. Cartwright	668	42.4	
Conservative	Toby N. Vintcent	558	35.4	
Liberal Democrats	Andrew G. Dickson	332	21.1	
Green	Cherry A. Puddicombe	19	1.2	
Turnout			43.4	
Labour hold		Swing		

The by-election was called following the resignation of Cllr Kenneth Burlton.

Palace by-election, 27 August 1992
Party	Candidate	Votes	%	±%
Conservative	Andrew P. Ground	1,280	79.7	
Labour	David J. Dunwoody	215	13.4	
Liberal Democrats	David L. Jacques	111	6.9	
Turnout			41.1	
Conservative hold		Swing		

The by-election was called following the death of Cllr Rosemary Belhaven.

Addison by-election, 24 September 1992
Party	Candidate	Votes	%	±%
Labour	Jane Hackworth-Young	1,014	56.9	
Conservative	Roderick J. Corrie	659	37.0	
Liberal Democrats	Angus J. McIntosh	78	4.4	
Green	Roger S. Crosskey	30	1.7	
Turnout			40.2	
Labour hold		Swing		

The by-election was called following the resignation of Cllr Bridget Prentice.

Grove by-election, 3 December 1992
Party	Candidate	Votes	%	±%
Labour	Jane E. Morris	906	60.2	
Conservative	Paul J. Jones	493	32.8	
Liberal Democrats	Nicholas M. Hopkins	106	7.0	
Turnout			36.0	
Labour hold		Swing		

The by-election was called following the resignation of Cllr Vivienne Lukey.

Town by-election, 28 January 1993
Party	Candidate	Votes	%	±%
Conservative	Antony C. Glover	904	61.3	
Labour	Lisa F. Homan	468	31.7	
Liberal Democrats	Paul G. Kennedy	103	7.0	
Turnout			35.9	
Conservative hold		Swing		

The by-election was called following the resignation of Cllr Terence McGrath.

College Park & Old Oak by-election, 8 July 1993
Party	Candidate	Votes	%	±%
Labour	Patricia M. Migdal	1,035	72.7	
Conservative	Tim Davie	290	20.4	
Liberal Democrats	Terence M. Frisby	98	6.9	
Turnout			26.9	
Labour hold		Swing		

The by-election was called following the resignation of Cllr Hilda McCafferty.

=== 1994-1998 ===
Town by-election, 25 January 1996
Party	Candidate	Votes	%	±%
Conservative	Stephen J. Greenhalgh	670	53.0	−2.1
Labour	Christopher M. Allan	435	34.4	+3.1
Liberal Democrats	Nathaniel J. Green	160	12.6	−1.0
Majority		235	18.6	
Turnout			29.4	
Conservative hold		Swing		

The by-election was called following the resignation of Cllr Antony Glover.

Crabtree by-election, 27 June 1996
Party	Candidate	Votes	%	±%
Labour	Melanie L. Smallman	832	49.0	
Conservative	Alexander P. Karmel	766	45.2	
Liberal Democrats	Brian Gallagher	98	5.8	
Majority		66	3.8	
Turnout		1,696	41.3	
Labour gain from Conservative		Swing		

The by-election was called following the resignation of Cllr Guy Mortimer.

Sulivan by-election, 25 July 1996
Party	Candidate	Votes	%	±%
Conservative	Nicholas B. Botterill	806	51.5	
Labour	Ronald Burns	609	38.9	
Liberal Democrats	Richard Patterson	121	7.7	
UKIP	Gerald Roberts	29	1.8	
Majority		197	12.6	
Turnout		1,565	37.2	
Conservative hold		Swing		

The by-election was called following the death of Cllr Jonathan Maiden.

Gibbs Green by-election, 10 July 1997
Party	Candidate	Votes	%	±%
Labour	Charles W. Treloggan	768	74.4	+19.2
Conservative	James W. Browne	208	20.2	−11.2
Liberal Democrats	Tamara Dragadze	56	5.4	−8.1
Majority		560	54.2	
Turnout		1,032	20.2	
Labour hold		Swing		

The by-election was called following the resignation of Cllr Iain Coleman.

=== 1998-2002 ===
Crabtree by-election, 10 June 1999
Party	Candidate	Votes	%	±%
Conservative	Amanda J. Lloyd-Harris	884	47.6	+2.7
Labour	Rory J. Vaughan	872	47.0	−1.4
Liberal Democrats	Jon Burden	99	5.4	−1.3
Majority		12	0.6	
Turnout		1,855	44.5	
Conservative hold		Swing		

The by-election was called following the resignation of Cllr Mark Simonds.

=== 2002-2006 ===
Sands End by-election, 12 September 2002
Party	Candidate	Votes	%	±%
Labour	Colin Pavelin	1,021	45.1	−2.9
Conservative	Stephen Hamilton	1,017	44.9	−0.1
Liberal Democrats	Dugald MacInnes	225	9.9	+2.9
Majority		4	0.2	
Turnout		2,263	33.9	
Labour gain from Conservative		Swing		

The by-election was called following the disqualification of Cllr Stephen Hamilton.

Ravenscourt Park by-election, 28 July 2005
Party	Candidate	Votes	%	±%
Conservative	Lucy V. Ivimy	1,069	44.3	+8.3
Labour	Anthony R. McMahon	757	31.4	−6.0
Liberal Democrats	Samuel R. Le Rougetel	585	24.3	−2.3
Majority		312	12.9	
Turnout		2,411	33.1	
Conservative hold		Swing		

The by-election was called following the death of Cllr Caroline Donald.

=== 2006-2010 ===
Sands End by-election, 1 May 2008
Party	Candidate	Votes	%	±%
Conservative	Ali De Lisle	2,257	57.5	+0.3
Labour	John B. Bird	1,147	29.2	−5.3
Liberal Democrats	Dugald MacInnes	518	13.2	+4.9
Majority		1,110	28.3	
Turnout		3,922		
Conservative hold		Swing		

The by-election was called following the resignation of Cllr Jeanette Bentley.

Town by-election, 15 October 2009
Party	Candidate	Votes	%	±%
Conservative	Oliver Craig	970	63.4	+0.8
Liberal Democrats	Paul Kennedy	289	18.9	+2.8
Labour	Andrew Jones	271	17.7	−3.6
Majority		681	44.5	
Turnout		1,530	20.3	
Conservative hold		Swing		

The by-election was called following the death of Cllr Antony Lillis.

=== 2010-2014 ===
Town by-election, 12 July 2012
Party	Candidate	Votes	%	±%
Conservative	Andrew R. Brown	768		
Labour	Ben Coleman	416		
Liberal Democrats	Paul Kennedy	331		
UKIP	Andrew Elston	39		
Turnout			20.5%	
Conservative hold		Swing		

The by-election was called following the resignation of Cllr Stephen Greenhalgh.

Wormholt & White City by-election, 7 February 2013
Party	Candidate	Votes	%	±%
Labour	Max Schmid	1,419	66.90	
Conservative	James McKittrick	251	11.83	
Liberal Democrats	Chris Whittaker	209	9.85	
UKIP	Andrew Elston	122	5.75	
no party label	Jeffrey Boateng	75	3.53	
BNP	Andrew Donald	45	2.12	
Majority		1,168	55.06	
Turnout		2,121	24.77	
Labour hold		Swing		

The by-election was called following the death of Cllr Jean Campbell.

=== 2014-2018 ===
Avonmore & Brook Green ward by-election, 8 June 2017
Party	Candidate	Votes	%	±%
Labour	David Morton	2,795	52.77	
Conservative	William Marshall	1,849	34.91	
Liberal Democrats	Irina von Wiese	653	8.37	
Majority		946	17.86	
Turnout		5,297	63.07	
Labour hold		Swing		

Sands End ward by-election, 8 June 2017
Party	Candidate	Votes	%	±%
Conservative	Jacqueline Borland	2,845	48.67	
Labour	Ann Rosenberg	2,669	45.66	
Liberal Democrats	Raymond Burnet	331	3.74%	
Majority		176	3.01	
Turnout		5,845	63.54	
Conservative hold		Swing		

=== 2018-2022 ===
Fulham Broadway ward by-election, 19 September 2019
Party	Candidate	Votes	%	±%
Labour	Helen Rowbottom	1,097	44.2	−11.3
Liberal Democrats	Jessie Venegas	755	30.4	+21.6
Conservative	Aliya Khan	628	25.3	−10.4
Majority		342	13.8	−6.0
Turnout		2,498	31.7	−6.0
Labour hold		Swing	-16.5	

The by-election was called following the resignation of Cllr Alan de'Ath, after taking up a politically restricted job.

Wormholt and White City ward by-election, 23 September 2021
Party	Candidate	Votes	%	±%
Labour	Frances Umeh	1,462	70.0	−8.0
Conservative	Constance Campbell	431	20.6	+6.2
Green	Naranee Ruthra-Rajan	110	5.3	+5.3
Liberal Democrats	Michael Illingworth	86	4.1	−2.4
Majority		1,031	49.4	
Turnout		2,089	22.6	−12.5
Labour hold		Swing		

The by-election was called following the death of Cllr Colin Aherne.

=== 2022-2026 ===
Hammersmith Broadway ward by-election, 20 February 2025
Party	Candidate	Votes	%	±%
Labour	Callum Nimmo	578	53.4	−18.2
Reform	Anthony Goodwin	148	13.7	+13.7
Conservative	Nora Farah	144	13.3	−5.5
Liberal Democrats	Meerav Shah	135	12.5	+2.9
Green	Colin Murphy	77	7.1	+7.1
Majority		430	39.7	
Turnout		1,082		
Labour hold		Swing		

The by-election was called following the resignation of Cllr Emma Apthorp.

Lillie ward by-election, 20 February 2025
Party	Candidate	Votes	%	±%
Labour	Lydia Paynter	466	40.4	−22.5
Conservative	Matt Sinclair	352	30.5	+4.9
Liberal Democrats	Conor Campbell	212	18.4	+6.9
Reform	Peter Hunter	123	10.7	+10.7
Majority		114	9.9	
Turnout		1,153		
Labour hold		Swing		

The by-election was called following the resignation of Cllr Ben Coleman MP.

Fulham Town ward by-election, 3 July 2025
Party	Candidate	Votes	%	±%
Conservative	Liam Downer-Sanderson	647	43.3	−1.7
Liberal Democrats	Roy Pounsford	345	18.4	−4.5
Labour	Sam Kelly	251	16.8	−10.6
Reform	Chris Clowes	187	12.5	+12.5
Green	Aidan Chisholm	63	4.2	+4.2
Majority		302	20.2	
Turnout		1,493		
Conservative hold		Swing		

The by-election was called following the resignation of Cllr Andrew Dinsmore.
