= Grove (Hammersmith and Fulham ward) =

Electoral ward in London, England

- Electoral ward for the Hammersmith and Fulham London Borough Council
- Grove ward boundaries since 2022
- Borough: Hammersmith and Fulham
- County: Greater London
- Population: 7,250 (2021) (Note: 2021 Census data reported for 2022 ward boundaries)
- Electorate: 5,203 (2022)
- Major settlements: Hammersmith
- Area: 0.4790 km²

Current electoral ward
- Created: 2022
- Councillors: 2; 3 (1964-1978)

Grove is an electoral ward in the London Borough of Hammersmith and Fulham. The ward was first used in the 2022 elections and elects two councillors to Hammersmith and Fulham London Borough Council. It previously existed between 1965 and 2002.

== List of councillors ==
Seat	Councillor	Took office	Left office	Party	Election
1	Stephen Cowan	2022	Incumbent	Labour	2022
2	Helen Rowbottom	2022	Incumbent	Labour	2022

== Hammersmith and Fulham council election since 2022 ==
There was a revision of ward boundaries in Hammersmith and Fulham in 2022 and the Grove ward was recreated.

=== 2022 election ===
The election took place on 5 May 2022.

2022 Hammersmith and Fulham London Borough Council election: Grove (2)
Party	Candidate	Votes	%	±%
Labour	Stephen Cowan	1,412	70.8	
Labour	Helen Rowbottom	1,372	68.8	
Conservative	Oliver Briscoe	360	18.1	
Liberal Democrats	Megan Roper	353	17.7	
Conservative	Donald Johnson	340	17.1	
Turnout		1,994	38.5	
Labour win (new seat)				
Labour win (new seat)				

== 1978–2002 Hammersmith and Fulham council elections ==
There was a revision of ward boundaries in Hammersmith in 1978. The borough and council were renamed Hammersmith and Fulham in 1979.

=== 1998 election ===
The election on 7 May 1998 took place on the same day as the 1998 Greater London Authority referendum.

1998 Hammersmith and Fulham London Borough Council election: Grove (2)
Party	Candidate	Votes	%	±%
Labour	Christopher Allen	992	56.62	▲2.50
Labour	Stephen Cowan	860		
Conservative	Amand Lloyd-Harris	487	28.55	▼3.95
Conservative	Edward Wilson	447		
Liberal Democrats	Michael Andrew	249	14.83	▲1.45
Liberal Democrats	Sophie Emmerson	236		
Registered electors		4,680		▲411
Turnout		1,747	37.33	▼10.20
Rejected ballots		15	0.86	▲0.66
Labour hold		Swing		
Labour hold		Swing		

=== 1994 election ===
The election took place on 5 May 1994.

=== 1992 by-election ===
The by-election took place on 3 December 1992, following the resignation of Vivienne Lukey.

1992 Grove by-election
Party	Candidate	Votes	%	±%
Labour	Jane Morris	906	60.2	
Conservative	Paul Jones	493	32.8	
Liberal Democrats	Nicholas Hopkins	106	7.0	
Turnout			36.0	
Labour hold		Swing		

=== 1990 election ===
The election took place on 3 May 1990.

=== 1986 election ===
The election took place on 8 May 1986.

=== 1982 election ===
The election took place on 6 May 1982.

=== 1978 election ===
The election took place on 4 May 1978.

== 1964–1978 Hammersmith council elections ==
=== 1974 election ===
The election took place on 2 May 1974.

=== 1971 election ===
The election took place on 13 May 1971.

=== 1968 election ===
The election took place on 9 May 1968.

1968 Hammersmith London Borough Council election: Grove (3)
Party	Candidate	Votes	%	±%
Conservative	Christopher Gibbons	1,433	58.4	
Conservative	George Boyce	1,422		
Conservative	Stuart Godwin	1,420		
Labour	E. Gosling	1,026	41.6	
Labour	F. Keppel	1,012		
Labour	T. Morris	1,010		
Turnout			34.4	
Conservative gain from Labour		Swing		
Conservative gain from Labour		Swing		
Conservative gain from Labour		Swing		

=== 1964 election ===
The election took place on 7 May 1964.

1964 Hammersmith London Borough Council election: Grove (3)
Party	Candidate	Votes	%	±%
Labour	T. Morris	1,409		
Labour	D. Murray	1,407		
Labour	E. Gosling	1,387		
Conservative	W. Sutton	847		
Conservative	H. Zander	826		
Conservative	C. Virando	823		
Turnout		2,221	30.8	
Labour win (new seat)				
Labour win (new seat)				
Labour win (new seat)				
