= 1982 Hammersmith and Fulham London Borough Council election =

1982 local election in England

1982 Hammersmith and Fulham Borough Council election
← 1978	6 May 1982	1986 →

All 50 seats to Hammersmith and Fulham London Borough Council 26 seats needed for a majority
- Turnout: 50.0% (▲2.4%

	First party	Second party	Third party
Party	Labour	Conservative	Alliance
Seats before	24	24	2
Seats won	25	23	2
Seat change	▲1	▼1	Steady
Popular vote	18,565	19,616	10,357
Percentage	37.0%	39.1%	20.6%
- Map of the results of the 1982 Hammersmith and Fulham council election. Conservatives in blue, Labour in red and the SDP–Liberal Alliance in yellow.
Council control before election
No overall control
Council control after election
No overall control

The 1982 Hammersmith and Fulham Council election took place on 6 May 1982 to elect members of Hammersmith and Fulham London Borough Council in London, England. The whole council was up for election and the council stayed in no overall control.

== Background ==
Both Labour and the Conservatives fielded a full slate of 50 candidates.

The SDP Liberal Alliance also ran a full 50 candidates - an increase from the 20 candidates they fielded in 1978. On the ballot paper the candidates were listed alternatively as 'SDP-Liberal Alliance' and 'Liberal Alliance-SDP'.

The Ecology Party ran a single candidate in four wards - Brook Green, Coningham, Grove and Walham.

A single candidate in seven wards declared themselves to be representing the Residents' Association - Addison, Broadway, Coningham, Eel Brook, Gibbs Green, Margravine and Sands End.

Three candidates in Addison ward, two in Brook Green ward and one each in Grove and Margravine wards listed themselves as Independents.

Two candidates in Broadway ward and one in Sherbrooke ward used the 'Save London Action Group' banner. This compared to 18 candidates in the 1978 election who listed themselves as part of the 'Save London Alliance'. Across London at this election a further 46 candidates used the SLAG banner.

The Workers Revolutionary Party fielded two candidate - one each in Margravine and White City & Shepherds Bush wards. This was up from the single candidate at the previous election. Across London the party fielded a further 13 candidates at this election.

The National Front fielded 2 candidates in the Wormholt ward - down from the 14 candidates they ran at the 1978 election in Hammersmith. Across London the National Front fielded a further 55 candidates at this election.

A total of 175 candidates put themselves forward for the 50 available seats - an increase from the 159 candidates who contested the previous election.

== Election result ==
The Labour Party won 25 seats (a gain of one seat), the Conservative Party 23 seats (a loss of one seat), and the SDP Liberal Alliance two seats (unchanged from the Liberal Party result in 1978). No party had overall control.

The Conservatives maintained control of the Council with the support of the two Liberal Alliance councillors - Kim Howe was elected Council Leader.

== Ward results ==
=== Addison ===
Addison (2)
Party	Candidate	Votes	%	±%
Conservative	Frances E.J. Belsham	763		
Conservative	Simon G. Chase	727		
Labour	Jennifer M. Litherland	722		
Labour	Terence N. Tucker	722		
Alliance	RaIson J. Davies	383		
Alliance	David R. Drabble	368		
Residents' Association	Arthur W. Blackmum	176		
Independent	Richard F. Clark	120		
Independent	Gwendoline N. Marsh	76		
Independent	John A.T. Rodd	69		
Turnout			%	%
Conservative hold		Swing		
Conservative hold		Swing		

=== Avonmore ===
Avonmore (2)
Party	Candidate	Votes	%	±%
Conservative	John C. Putnam	1,043		
Conservative	Dominic C.R. Grieve	1,001		
Labour	Peter Conway	524		
Labour	Diana Basterfield	493		
Alliance	Patricia F. Pearson	331		
Alliance	Michael W.M. Orr	313		
Turnout			%	%
Conservative hold		Swing		
Conservative hold		Swing		

=== Broadway ===
Broadway (2)
Party	Candidate	Votes	%	±%
Alliance	Simon H.J.A. Knott	939		
Alliance	Robert Mulcahy	694		
Labour	John H. Gorter	636		
Labour	Bridget T. Prentice	618		
Conservative	Richard J. Caswell	273		
Conservative	Peter S. Seward	250		
Residents' Association	Anthony Horgan	146		
Save London Action Group	Derek N. Hulme	146		
Save London Action Group	Brett Woods	10		
Turnout			%	%
Alliance hold		Swing		
Alliance hold		Swing		

=== Brook Green ===
Brook Green (2)
Party	Candidate	Votes	%	±%
Conservative	John A. Hennessy	1,032		
Conservative	Peter C. Prince	939		
Labour	Louanne Tranchell	513		
Labour	John A. Bullock	477		
Alliance	Dominic C.A. Simon	429		
Alliance	Edward M. Wilson	398		
Independent	David A. Constable	133		
Independent	Anthony B.P. Mockler	132		
Ecology	Deborah M. Sutherland	65		
Turnout			%	%
Conservative hold		Swing		
Conservative hold		Swing		

=== Colehill ===
Colehill (2)
Party	Candidate	Votes	%	±%
Conservative	Martin R.T. Howe	1,053		
Conservative	Michael R. Lingens	981		
Labour	Jennifer A. Clark	745		
Labour	Alan C. Tennock	722		
Alliance	Ian S.H. Franks	341		
Alliance	Gerald Arthur Dowden	288		
Turnout			%	%
Conservative hold		Swing		
Conservative hold		Swing		

=== College Park & Old Oak ===
College Park & Old Oak (3)
Party	Candidate	Votes	%	±%
Labour	Melvyn Silverman	900		
Labour	Petra Luxton	844		
Labour	Margaret Fenelon	817		
Conservative	Frederick P.A. Herbert	569		
Conservative	Gwenyth Herbert	556		
Alliance	Trevor K. Harrison	489		
Alliance	Fiona Wilson	459		
Conservative	Khalil A. Khan	449		
Alliance	Josephine Knott	428		
Turnout			%	%
Labour hold		Swing		
Labour hold		Swing		
Labour hold		Swing		

=== Coningham ===
Coningham (3)
Party	Candidate	Votes	%	±%
Labour	James Bull	1,232		
Labour	Daniel A. Filson	1,152		
Labour	Joseph S. Mirwitch	1,020		
Conservative	Ian Clarke	623		
Conservative	William J.S. Hodgson	559		
Conservative	Richard J. Clarke	542		
Alliance	David A. Bennett	448		
Alliance	John T. Dowdalls	409		
Alliance	Angela Kelly	392		
Residents' Association	Albert J. Harte	302		
Ecology	Jane N. Shepherd	72		
Turnout			%	%
Labour hold		Swing		
Labour hold		Swing		
Labour hold		Swing		

=== Crabtree ===
Crabtree (2)
Party	Candidate	Votes	%	±%
Conservative	Kim G.F.B. Howe	1,055		
Conservative	Patricia A. Fitzgerald	1,030		
Labour	Michael Gannon	715		
Labour	Francis J. Lukey	704		
Alliance	Hugh D. Duff	364		
Alliance	Suzan L.M. St Maur	308		
Turnout			%	%
Conservative hold		Swing		
Conservative hold		Swing		

=== Eel Brook ===
Eel Brook (2)
Party	Candidate	Votes	%	±%
Labour	Edward D. Cunningham	932		
Labour	Ian J. Harrison	925		
Conservative	Peter N.J. Bryant	881		
Conservative	Garry Jones	836		
Alliance	Sally E.M. O'Brien	297		
Alliance	Ina J.G. Howells	261		
Residents' Association	Thomas A. Davies	141		
Turnout			%	%
Labour gain from Conservative		Swing		
Labour gain from Conservative		Swing		

=== Gibbs Green ===
Gibbs Green (2)
Party	Candidate	Votes	%	±%
Labour	Frances D. Kelly	843		
Labour	Gordon Prentice	750		
Conservative	Michael Fallon	730		
Conservative	Neil C. Morgan	674		
Alliance	Simon D.P. Pellew	357		
Alliance	Ian R. Hetherington	327		
Residents' Association	Geoffrey A.W. Dove	167		
Turnout			%	%
Labour hold		Swing		
Labour hold		Swing		

=== Grove ===
Grove (2)
Party	Candidate	Votes	%	±%
Labour	Stephen P. Clark	887		
Labour	Hugh Thomson	844		
Conservative	Howard D. Harries	818		
Conservative	David Ellis	770		
Alliance	Anthony M. Halmos	448		
Alliance	Ian McCourt	438		
Independent	Geoffrey H. Kane	64		
Ecology	Stanley E.G. Jones	58		
Turnout			%	%
Labour hold		Swing		
Labour hold		Swing		

=== Margravine ===
Margravine (2)
Party	Candidate	Votes	%	±%
Labour	David B. Jordan	856		
Labour	William C. Spiers	855		
Conservative	Ernest C. Ibbott	527		
Conservative	Anthony L. Stacpoole	491		
Alliance	Frederick T. Brent	181		
Alliance	Leonard T. Bonser	170		
Independent	Joseph C. Keats	39		
Residents' Association	Peter F. Cleverly	32		
Workers Revolutionary	Lorna Rhone	15		
Turnout			%	%
Labour hold		Swing		
Labour hold		Swing		

=== Normand ===
Normand (2)
Party	Candidate	Votes	%	±%
Labour	Eleanor J. Caruana	1,057		
Labour	Margaret J. Sondergaard	965		
Conservative	Edgar G.A. Rabbets	839		
Conservative	Kenneth M. Walker	804		
Alliance	Richard C. Pratt	466		
Alliance	Joan Bonser	370		
Turnout			%	%
Labour hold		Swing		
Labour hold		Swing		

=== Palace ===
Palace (2)
Party	Candidate	Votes	%	±%
Conservative	Richard G. Hoddinott	1,585		
Conservative	Stuart N.B. Leishman	1,559		
Labour	George W. Dimmick	363		
Labour	Julia L. Steinhart	348		
Alliance	Susan E.H. Rendel	344		
Alliance	Gillian M. Franks	340		
Turnout			%	%
Conservative hold		Swing		
Conservative hold		Swing		

=== Ravenscourt ===
Ravenscourt (2)
Party	Candidate	Votes	%	±%
Conservative	Angela Clarke	990		
Conservative	Rosemary Belhaven	977		
Labour	Paul R. Fiander	570		
Alliance	Edward C.R. Fawcett			
Labour	Ian Willmore	507		
Alliance	Simon J.B. Knott	432		
Turnout			%	%
Conservative hold		Swing		
Conservative hold		Swing		

=== Sands End ===
Sands End (2)
Party	Candidate	Votes	%	±%
Labour	Anthony F.W. Powell	1,019		
Labour	Clive A. Wisbey	929		
Conservative	Aidan J.M. Gibbs	628		
Conservative	James L. Malthouse	625		
Alliance	Malcolm J. Austin	294		
Alliance	Jennifer M. Huebner	274		
Residents' Association	John H. Garcka	33		
Turnout			%	%
Labour hold		Swing		
Labour hold		Swing		

=== Sherbrooke ===
Sherbrooke (2)
Party	Candidate	Votes	%	±%
Conservative	David A.D. Tweedie	823		
Labour	Ian Gray	817		
Labour	Margaret E. Ingram	738		
Conservative	Henrietta M.B. Varley	717		
Alliance	Hector I. McDonald	299		
Alliance	Henry C.Q. Brownrigg	289		
Save London Action Group	Jonathan Raimes	29		
Turnout			%	%
Conservative gain from Labour		Swing		
Labour hold		Swing		

=== Starch Green ===
Starch Green (2)
Party	Candidate	Votes	%	±%
Labour	Leslie S.A. Jones	742		
Conservative	Patricia J. Ward	727		
Conservative	Eric J. Hutson	716		
Labour	Michael R. Phipps	705		
Alliance	Michael J. Starks	504		
Alliance	Matthew J. Roche	455		
Turnout			%	%
Labour gain from Conservative		Swing		
Conservative hold		Swing		

=== Sulivan ===
Sulivan (2)
Party	Candidate	Votes	%	±%
Conservative	Gerald A. Wombwell	1,146		
Conservative	Nicholas N. Browne	1,138		
Alliance	David D. Rendel	979		
Alliance	Peter M. Crystal	890		
Labour	Valerie A. Gorter	617		
Labour	Thomas Lipscomb	602		
Turnout			%	%
Conservative hold		Swing		
Conservative hold		Swing		

=== Town ===
Town (2)
Party	Candidate	Votes	%	±%
Conservative	David W. Clark	1,245		
Conservative	Fiona A.R. McGregor	1,242		
Labour	Leslie H. Hilliard	610		
Labour	Colyn W. Davies	594		
Alliance	Stephen W. Unwin	453		
Alliance	Peter J. Somerville	413		
Turnout			%	%
Conservative hold		Swing		
Conservative hold		Swing		

=== Walham ===
Walham (2)
Party	Candidate	Votes	%	±%
Conservative	Diana P.A. Chiesman	869		
Conservative	Julian N. Rampton	850		
Labour	Richard W. Rayner	844		
Labour	Brian E. Vaughan	773		
Alliance	John R.W.F. Graham	510		
Alliance	Regene Nissan	384		
Ecology	Cheryl R. Worsley	22		
Turnout			%	%
Conservative hold		Swing		
Conservative hold		Swing		

=== White City & Shepherds Bush ===
White City & Shepherds Bush (3)
Party	Candidate	Votes	%	±%
Labour	Ivan A. Gibbons	1,315		
Labour	Peter D. De Gory	1,256		
Labour	Gwendoline Braggins	1,118		
Conservative	Susan G. Gale	376		
Alliance	Sean P.G. Cullen	370		
Alliance	Raymond A. London	350		
Alliance	Malcolm A. Turner	289		
Conservative	Vida Zabavnik	271		
Conservative	Muhammad Sharif	268		
Workers Revolutionary	Calvin M. Stewart	84		
Turnout			%	%
Labour hold		Swing		
Labour hold		Swing		
Labour hold		Swing		

=== Wormholt ===
Wormholt (3)
Party	Candidate	Votes	%	±%
Labour	Mary S. Best	1,106		
Labour	Alan G. Breeze	1,104		
Conservative	William C. Smith	1,021		
Conservative	Peter R.H. Hardy	955		
Labour	Josephine A. Wicks	933		
Conservative	Brian I. Maze	932		
Alliance	Margaret A. Connaughton	569		
Alliance	David Ash	560		
Alliance	Norma M. Hare	503		
National Front	Alistair I. Cameron	63		
National Front	Robert L.J. Pearse	61		
Turnout			%	%
Labour hold		Swing		
Labour hold		Swing		
Conservative gain from Labour		Swing		
