= 1974 Hammersmith London Borough Council election =

George Eli Clarke Simpson(1919-1992)

1974 Hammersmith Council election
← 1971	2 May 1974	1978 →

All 60 seats to Hammersmith and Fulham London Borough Council 31 seats needed for a majority
- Turnout: 41.3% (▼6.3%)

	First party	Second party	Third party
Party	Labour	Conservative	Liberal
Last election	58 seats, 61.6%	2 seats, 36.5%	0 seats, 1.8%
Seats won	48	10	2
Seat change	▼10	▲8	▲2
Popular vote	25,143	15,930	3,125
Percentage	56.0%	35.5%	7.0%
Swing	▼5.6%	▼1.0%	▲5.2%
Council control before election
Labour
Council control after election
Labour

The 1974 Hammersmith Council election took place on 2 May 1974 to elect members of Hammersmith London Borough Council in London, England. The whole council was up for election and the Labour Party stayed in overall control of the council.

== Background ==
Both Labour and the Conservatives fielded a full slate of 60 candidates, as usual.

The Liberal Party ran 19 candidates across seven wards - an increase on the seven candidates across three wards which they ran in 1971.

In an era when candidates could choose their party designation without reference to an officially registered entity - two candidates in the Avonmore ward ran under the 'Powellite Conservative' banner. These were the only candidates across the whole of the London local elections to use this designation.

Whilst 125 people across London stood as Communist Party candidates - there was just one in Hammersmith. Mr J Gould stood again in the White City ward.

Across London 72 people stood under the 'Save London Action Group' banner - but in Hammersmith there was a single such candidate, in the Crabtree ward.

Two independent candidates stood for election - one each in Crabtree ward and St Stephen's ward.

A total of 145 candidates put themselves forward for the 60 seats.

== Election result ==
The Labour Party won 48 seats - a loss of 10 seats from the previous election, but remained firmly in control. The Conservative Party won 10 seats - a gain of 8 seats from their previous result. The Liberal Party won 2 seats - a gain of two from the last election, and the first time that any party other than Labour and the Conservatives won a seat on this council. One of the newly elected Liberal councillors (Simon Knott) previously stood as a candidate at all three elections for the same ward.

== Ward results ==
=== Addison ===
Addison (3)
Party	Candidate	Votes	%	±%
Labour	Hammond, Mrs C. J.	999		
Labour	Hanscomb, L.	934		
Labour	Perlin, P. S.	908		
Conservative	Belsham Mrs F. E. J.	832		
Conservative	Fleetwood-Hesketh, Miss E. D.	817		
Conservative	Prior, C. C. L.	795		
Turnout			%	%
Labour hold		Swing		
Labour hold		Swing		
Labour hold		Swing		

=== Avonmore ===
Avonmore (2)
Party	Candidate	Votes	%	±%
Conservative	Putnam, J. C.	982		
Conservative	Wylie, J.C.	965		
Labour	Whalley, Miss A.	701		
Labour	Hall, M. A.	677		
Liberal	Dyer, Mrs C. M.	233		
Liberal	Davis, B.	204		
Powellite Conservative	Simmerson, R. E. G.	65		
Powellite Conservative	Stokes, M. R.	50		
Turnout			%	%
Conservative hold		Swing		
Conservative hold		Swing		

=== Broadway ===
Broadway (3)
Party	Candidate	Votes	%	±%
Liberal	Knott, S. H. J. A.	1,370		
Labour	Simpson, G. E. C.	1,054		
Liberal	Stratton, Miss C. E.	997		
Labour	Mason, Mrs A. E.	988		
Labour	Harris, Mrs S. H.	954		
Liberal	Allen, H. V.	925		
Conservative	Bryce-Smith, N.	599		
Conservative	Hogan, Miss G. C.	560		
Conservative	Cohen, I.	550		
Turnout			%	%
Liberal gain from Labour		Swing		
Labour hold		Swing		
Liberal gain from Labour		Swing		

=== Brook Green ===
Brook Green (3)
Party	Candidate	Votes	%	±%
Conservative	Smith, W. C.	1,097		
Conservative	Field, R. G.	1,090		
Conservative	Waterson, N. C.	1,072		
Labour	Stanley, L. W.	773		
Labour	Wicks, Mrs J. A.	726		
Labour	Bamford, Mrs M. J.	720		
Liberal	Chase, S. G.	357		
Liberal	Holt, B.	339		
Liberal	Holt, Mrs M. M.	339		
Turnout			%	%
Conservative gain from Labour		Swing		
Conservative gain from Labour		Swing		
Conservative gain from Labour		Swing		

=== Colehill ===
Colehill (2)
Party	Candidate	Votes	%	±%
Labour	O'Neill, L. C.	940		
Labour	Dimmick, Mrs G. I.	872		
Conservative	Maxwell, P. B.	423		
Conservative	Akerman, J. F. S.	417		
Liberal	George, K.	264		
Liberal	Strickland, Mrs H.	249		
Turnout			%	%
Labour hold		Swing		
Labour hold		Swing		

=== College Park & Old Oak ===
College Park & Old Oak (3)
Party	Candidate	Votes	%	±%
Labour	Fenelon, Miss M.	1,756		
Labour	Ing, F. W.	1,756		
Labour	Breeze, A. G.	1,749		
Conservative	Gellately-Smith, Mrs K. E.	285		
Conservative	Patterson, Mrs C. G.	262		
Conservative	Wright, B. L. D.	250		
Turnout			%	%
Labour hold		Swing		
Labour hold		Swing		
Labour hold		Swing		

=== Coningham ===
Coningham (3)
Party	Candidate	Votes	%	±%
Labour	Bull, J.	914		
Labour	Crawford, Mrs E.	899		
Labour	Martin, A. J.	873		
Conservative	Harris, R. M.	376		
Conservative	Hutson, Mrs C. J.	374		
Conservative	Barnard, Miss M. W.	361		
Turnout			%	%
Labour hold		Swing		
Labour hold		Swing		
Labour hold		Swing		

=== Crabtree ===
Crabtree (3)
Party	Candidate	Votes	%	±%
Labour	Banfield, Mrs D. J.	1,340		
Conservative	Howe, K. G. F. B.	1,297		
Labour	Evans, J. G.	1,295		
Labour	Hewitt, J. J. A.	1285		
Conservative	Tickler, G. R. G. C.	1267		
Conservative	Fitzgerald, Miss P. A.	1263		
Save London Action Group	de Maupeou, Mrs V. M.	132		
Independent	Ashworth, M. S.	124		
Turnout			%	%
Labour hold		Swing		
Conservative gain from Labour		Swing		
Labour hold		Swing		

=== Gibbs Green ===
Gibbs Green (3)
Party	Candidate	Votes	%	±%
Labour	Clarke, Mrs M. L.	1,388		
Labour	Kelly, Miss F. D.	1,340		
Labour	Norridge, A. M.	1,308		
Conservative	James, S.	1018		
Conservative	Browne, N. N.	1017		
Conservative	Lengyel, P. I. S.	984		
Liberal	Lyon, C.	311		
Liberal	Cox, Mrs C.	308		
Liberal	Barrington-Ward, Miss C.	250		
Turnout			%	%
Labour hold		Swing		
Labour hold		Swing		
Labour hold		Swing		

=== Grove ===
Grove (3)
Party	Candidate	Votes	%	±%
Labour	Jackson, Mrs M.	1,286		
Labour	Jacobs, P. S.	1,281		
Labour	Jowett, Mrs D.	1,244		
Conservative	Phillips, P. M.	920		
Conservative	O'Connor, C.	909		
Conservative	Thomas, D. E. G.	878		
Turnout			%	%
Labour hold		Swing		
Labour hold		Swing		
Labour hold		Swing		

=== Halford ===
Halford (3)
Party	Candidate	Votes	%	±%
Labour	Green, A.	1,136		
Labour	O'Neill, Mrs S. M.	1,104		
Labour	McCourt, I.	1,103		
Conservative	Jarvis, Mrs M. M.	641		
Conservative	Cox, W. D. S.	629		
Conservative	Osmond, A. J.	612		
Turnout			%	%
Labour hold		Swing		
Labour hold		Swing		
Labour hold		Swing		

=== Margravine ===
Margravine (3)
Party	Candidate	Votes	%	±%
Labour	Champion, T. H.	1,317		
Labour	Rayner, R. W.	1,286		
Labour	Soley, C. S.	1,275		
Conservative	Osmond, Mrs C. M.	436		
Conservative	Wooster, Mrs B. E	416		
Conservative	Becker, R. A	411		
Turnout			%	%
Labour hold		Swing		
Labour hold		Swing		
Labour hold		Swing		

=== Parsons Green ===
Parsons Green (3)
Party	Candidate	Votes	%	±%
Conservative	Jackson, A. R.	1,448		
Conservative	Leishman, Mrs B. M.	1,420		
Conservative	Leishman, S. N. B.	1,400		
Labour	Duff, H. D.	1335		
Labour	Hammocks, J.	1287		
Labour	Dimmick, G. W.	1252		
Turnout			%	%
Conservative gain from Labour		Swing		
Conservative gain from Labour		Swing		
Conservative gain from Labour		Swing		

=== St Stephen's ===
St Stephen's (3)
Party	Candidate	Votes	%	±%
Labour	Jones, L. S.	936		
Labour	Braggins, Mrs G.	927		
Labour	Degory, P. D.	923		
Liberal	Griffith, Mrs E.	286		
Conservative	Cohen, Mrs R.	265		
Liberal	Turner, M. A.	265		
Liberal	Coombes, Mrs V. E. K.	249		
Conservative	Webb, F. W. Miss	221		
Independent	Sugrue, M. J.	215		
Conservative	Sharif, M.	206		
Turnout			%	%
Labour hold		Swing		
Labour hold		Swing		
Labour hold		Swing		

=== Sandford ===
Sandford (3)
Party	Candidate	Votes	%	±%
Labour	Ireland, J.	1,744		
Labour	Raynsford, W. R. N.	1,709		
Labour	Finn, M.	1,670		
Conservative	Hayes, F. G.	839		
Conservative	Hammond, S. T.	833		
Conservative	Lapham, R. D.	815		
Turnout			%	%
Labour hold		Swing		
Labour hold		Swing		
Labour hold		Swing		

=== Sherbrooke ===
Sherbrooke (2)
Party	Candidate	Votes	%	±%
Labour	Chapman, Mrs J.	1,174		
Labour	Gray, I.	1,108		
Conservative	De Chair, H. G. D.	327		
Conservative	Barrow, B. P.	321		
Turnout			%	%
Labour hold		Swing		
Labour hold		Swing		

=== Starch Green ===
Starch Green (3)
Party	Candidate	Votes	%	±%
Labour	Freeman, L. W.	1,086		
Labour	Johnson, Mrs R. M.	1,069		
Labour	Wicks, L. J.	1,011		
Conservative	Lewis, C. A.	995		
Conservative	Hutson, E. J.	992		
Conservative	Radmore, C. D.	980		
Liberal	Cook, Miss S. C.	304		
Liberal	Quinn, S.	278		
Liberal	Beger-Spayne, Mrs E. C.	258		
Turnout			%	%
Labour hold		Swing		
Labour hold		Swing		
Labour hold		Swing		

=== Sulivan ===
Sulivan (3)
Party	Candidate	Votes	%	±%
Labour	Powell, A. F. W.	1,598		
Labour	Godden, Mrs V.	1,577		
Labour	Liardet, Mrs C. J.	1,556		
Conservative	Ibbott, E. C.	1101		
Conservative	Kingham, B.	1101		
Conservative	Colegrave, W. R. B.	1081		
Turnout			%	%
Labour hold		Swing		
Labour hold		Swing		
Labour hold		Swing		

=== Town ===
Town (3)
Party	Candidate	Votes	%	±%
Labour	Hilliard, L. H.	1,245		
Labour	Unwin, S. W.	1,239		
Conservative	Clarke, Mrs E. L. L.	1,237		
Conservative	Colling, D. J.	1234		
Conservative	Tweedie, D. A. O.	1220		
Labour	Widdowson, R.	1217		
Turnout			%	%
Labour hold		Swing		
Labour hold		Swing		
Conservative gain from Labour		Swing		

=== White City ===
White City (3)
Party	Candidate	Votes	%	±%
Labour	Hathaway, Miss J. M.	1,237		
Labour	Stead, B. J.	1,084		
Labour	Beresford, R.	1,068		
Conservative	Gellately-Smith, R.	238		
Conservative	Lewis, Mrs C. H.	232		
Conservative	Rolfe, Mrs P. F.	217		
Communist	Gould, J.	176		
Turnout			%	%
Labour hold		Swing		
Labour hold		Swing		
Labour hold		Swing		

=== Wormholt ===
Wormholt (3)
Party	Candidate	Votes	%	±%
Labour	Ingram, A. A.	1,184		
Labour	Donoghue, O.	1,164		
Labour	Ingram, Mrs M. E.	1,153		
Conservative	Barnes, J. M.	574		
Conservative	Darwin, Mrs J. M.	544		
Conservative	Lesniowski, J. J.	534		
Turnout			%	%
Labour hold		Swing		
Labour hold		Swing		
Labour hold		Swing		
