= 1971 Hammersmith London Borough Council election =

1971 local election in England

1971 Hammersmith Borough Council election
← 1968	13 May 1971	1974 →

All 60 seats to Hammersmith and Fulham London Borough Council 31 seats needed for a majority
- Turnout: 47.6% (▲8.5%)

	First party	Second party	Third party
Party	Labour	Conservative	Liberal
Seats before	6	54	0
Seats won	58	2	0
Seat change	▲52	▼52	Steady
Percentage	61.6%	36.5%	1.8%
Swing	▲22.6%	▼21.5%	▼0.6%
Council control before election
Conservative
Council control after election
Labour

The 1971 Hammersmith Council election took place on 13 May 1971 to elect members of Hammersmith London Borough Council in London, England. The whole council was up for election and the Labour Party gained overall control of the council.

== Election result ==
The Labour Party won 58 seats - a gain of 52 seats from the previous election, taking control of the council. The Conservative Party won 2 seats (the Avonmore ward) - a loss of 52 seats from their previous result, and lost control of the council.

The Liberal Party stood candidates in three wards, and a single candidate stood for the Communist Party, but none of these won a seat.

== Ward results ==
=== Addison ===
Addison (3)
Party	Candidate	Votes	%	±%
Labour	Bamford M. J. Mrs	1,257		
Labour	O'Neill L. C.	1,254		
Labour	Stanley L. W.	1,245		
Conservative	Belsham F. E. J. Mrs	1,014		
Conservative	Barker H. O. A.	997		
Conservative	Berend A. P.	976		
Turnout			%	%
Labour gain from Conservative		Swing		
Labour gain from Conservative		Swing		
Labour gain from Conservative		Swing		

=== Avonmore ===
Avonmore (2)
Party	Candidate	Votes	%	±%
Conservative	Dwyer P. G.	1,234		
Conservative	Simmerson R. E.	1,211		
Labour	Dimmick R. S.	886		
Labour	House M.	848		
Turnout			%	%
Conservative hold		Swing		
Conservative hold		Swing		

=== Broadway ===
Broadway (3)
Party	Candidate	Votes	%	±%
Labour	Simpson G. E. C.	1,364		
Labour	Clarke M. L. Mrs	1,358		
Labour	Harris S. Mrs	1,304		
Liberal	Knott S. H. J. A.	1,022		
Conservative	Chapman J. C.	909		
Conservative	Goodden E. S. Mrs	901		
Conservative	Honeybourne C. T.	887		
Liberal	Groves R. J.	670		
Liberal	Abrahams F. Mrs	662		
Turnout			%	%
Labour gain from Conservative		Swing		
Labour gain from Conservative		Swing		
Labour gain from Conservative		Swing		

=== Brook Green ===
Brook Green (3)
Party	Candidate	Votes	%	±%
Labour	Hudson M.	1,372		
Labour	Taylor J.	1,352		
Labour	Rayner R. W.	1,348		
Conservative	Tait G. N.	1,327		
Conservative	Field R. G.	1,313		
Conservative	Ford T. G.	1,312		
Turnout			%	%
Labour gain from Conservative		Swing		
Labour gain from Conservative		Swing		
Labour gain from Conservative		Swing		

=== Colehill ===
Colehill (2)
Party	Candidate	Votes	%	±%
Labour	Dimmick G. I. Mrs	1,381		
Labour	Worboys D. K.	1,353		
Conservative	Skalla L.	716		
Conservative	Porter M. Mrs	711		
Turnout			%	%
Labour gain from Conservative		Swing		
Labour gain from Conservative		Swing		

=== College Park & Old Oak ===
College Park & Old Oak (3)
Party	Candidate	Votes	%	±%
Labour	Powell A. F. W.	1,884		
Labour	Fenelon M. Miss	1,862		
Labour	Ing F. W.	1,854		
Conservative	Whittaker E. M. Miss	631		
Conservative	Hutson C. J. Mrs	608		
Conservative	Bowler R. W.	601		
Turnout			%	%
Labour gain from Conservative		Swing		
Labour gain from Conservative		Swing		
Labour gain from Conservative		Swing		

=== Coningham ===
Coningham (3)
Party	Candidate	Votes	%	±%
Labour	Hathaway J. M. Miss	1,392		
Labour	Bull J.	1,368		
Labour	Martin A. J.	1,335		
Conservative	Hammond H. R.	786		
Conservative	York I. D. Mrs	710		
Conservative	Hutson E. J.	709		
Turnout			%	%
Labour gain from Conservative		Swing		
Labour gain from Conservative		Swing		
Labour gain from Conservative		Swing		

=== Crabtree ===
Crabtree (3)
Party	Candidate	Votes	%	±%
Labour	Banfield D. Mrs	1,864		
Labour	Evans J. G.	1,844		
Labour	Little B. Mrs	1,795		
Conservative	Horne C. F.	1,707		
Conservative	Ashby D. G.	1,694		
Conservative	Joseph D. M. L. Mrs	1,689		
Turnout			%	%
Labour gain from Conservative		Swing		
Labour gain from Conservative		Swing		
Labour gain from Conservative		Swing		

=== Gibbs Green ===
Gibbs Green (3)
Party	Candidate	Votes	%	±%
Labour	Norridge A. M.	1,568		
Labour	Perlin H. H.	1,529		
Labour	Perlin P. Mrs	1,487		
Conservative	Patterson G. B.	1,361		
Conservative	Lengyel P. I. S.	1,349		
Conservative	Arnold C. E.	1,345		
Turnout			%	%
Labour gain from Conservative		Swing		
Labour gain from Conservative		Swing		
Labour gain from Conservative		Swing		

=== Grove ===
Grove (3)
Party	Candidate	Votes	%	±%
Labour	Gosling E. R.	1,793		
Labour	Keppel F. E.	1,757		
Labour	Morris T.	1,752		
Conservative	Jones R. A.	984		
Conservative	Boyce G. A.	974		
Conservative	Woodfield A. M. Miss	960		
Turnout			%	%
Labour gain from Conservative		Swing		
Labour gain from Conservative		Swing		
Labour gain from Conservative		Swing		

=== Halford ===
Halford (3)
Party	Candidate	Votes	%	±%
Labour	Green A.	1,652		
Labour	Hedger S. M. Miss	1,606		
Labour	McCourt I.	1,604		
Conservative	Hardman J.	772		
Conservative	Jarvis M. M. Mrs	750		
Conservative	Cox W. D. S.	733		
Liberal	Dowden Gerald Arthur	155		
Liberal	Stratton C. E. Miss	126		
Liberal	Hodgkinson B. J.	122		
Turnout			%	%
Labour gain from Conservative		Swing		
Labour gain from Conservative		Swing		
Labour gain from Conservative		Swing		

=== Margravine ===
Margravine (3)
Party	Candidate	Votes	%	±%
Labour	Hill E. L.	1,824		
Labour	Champion T. H.	1,810		
Labour	Matthews S. A.	1,786		
Conservative	List W.	606		
Conservative	Fitzgerald P. A. Miss	599		
Conservative	Beckett V. E. Mrs	587		
Turnout			%	%
Labour hold		Swing		
Labour hold		Swing		
Labour gain from Conservative		Swing		

=== Parsons Green ===
Parsons Green (3)
Party	Candidate	Votes	%	±%
Labour	Dimmick G. W.	1,961		
Labour	Duff H. D.	1,936		
Labour	Hall S. E. Miss	1,902		
Conservative	Ground R. P.	1,591		
Conservative	Ackerman J. F. S.	1,577		
Conservative	Howe K. G. F. B.	1,542		
Liberal	House W. J.	168		
Turnout			%	%
Labour gain from Conservative		Swing		
Labour gain from Conservative		Swing		
Labour gain from Conservative		Swing		

=== St Stephen's ===
St Stephen's (3)
Party	Candidate	Votes	%	±%
Labour	Braggins G. Mrs	1,652		
Labour	Degory P. D.	1,650		
Labour	Jones L. S. A.	1,640		
Conservative	Cohen R. Mrs	559		
Conservative	Stephens E. G. Miss	529		
Conservative	Wearmouth W. H.	507		
Turnout			%	%
Labour gain from Conservative		Swing		
Labour gain from Conservative		Swing		
Labour gain from Conservative		Swing		

=== Sandford ===
Sandford (3)
Party	Candidate	Votes	%	±%
Labour	Ireland J. J.	2,362		
Labour	Little A. H.	2,276		
Labour	Raynesford W. R. N.	2,234		
Conservative	Ibbott E.	932		
Conservative	Moody T.	924		
Conservative	O'Brien D. A.	917		
Turnout			%	%
Labour gain from Conservative		Swing		
Labour gain from Conservative		Swing		
Labour gain from Conservative		Swing		

=== Sherbrooke ===
Sherbrooke (2)
Party	Candidate	Votes	%	±%
Labour	Morgan R. G.	1,671		
Labour	Chapman J. Mrs	1,637		
Conservative	Tomlinson I. M. Mrs	439		
Conservative	De Voghelaere S. E. Mrs	421		
Turnout			%	%
Labour gain from Conservative		Swing		
Labour hold		Swing		

=== Starch Green ===
Starch Green (3)
Party	Candidate	Votes	%	±%
Labour	Freeman L. W.	1,529		
Labour	Johnson R. Mrs	1,493		
Labour	Wicks L. J.	1,451		
Conservative	Ward D. G.	1,281		
Conservative	Sexton M. E. Mrs	1,277		
Conservative	Dessimone V. C.	1,271		
Turnout			%	%
Labour gain from Conservative		Swing		
Labour gain from Conservative		Swing		
Labour gain from Conservative		Swing		

=== Sulivan ===
Sulivan (3)
Party	Candidate	Votes	%	±%
Labour	Hall M. A.	2,307		
Labour	Liardet C. J. Mrs	2,289		
Labour	Unwin S. W.	2,273		
Conservative	Wagner C. M. Miss	1,357		
Conservative	Ground C. Mrs	1,339		
Conservative	Burland W. J.	1,320		
Turnout			%	%
Labour gain from Conservative		Swing		
Labour gain from Conservative		Swing		
Labour gain from Conservative		Swing		

=== Town ===
Town (3)
Party	Candidate	Votes	%	±%
Labour	Gray I.	1,622		
Labour	Hilliard L. H.	1,616		
Labour	Boswell J. S.	1,612		
Conservative	Phillips P. M.	1,386		
Conservative	Falkiner G. Mrs	1,380		
Conservative	Vincent J. A.	1,363		
Turnout			%	%
Labour gain from Conservative		Swing		
Labour gain from Conservative		Swing		
Labour gain from Conservative		Swing		

=== White City ===
White City (3)
Party	Candidate	Votes	%	±%
Labour	Murray D. R. P.	2,049		
Labour	Stead B. J.	2,024		
Labour	Beresford R.	2,014		
Conservative	Rolfe P. F. Mrs	398		
Conservative	Stimpson M. A.	379		
Conservative	Jankovich V. M.	370		
Communist	Gould J.	136		
Turnout			%	%
Labour hold		Swing		
Labour hold		Swing		
Labour hold		Swing		

=== Wormholt ===
Wormholt (3)
Party	Candidate	Votes	%	±%
Labour	Breeze A. G.	1,760		
Labour	Donoghue O.	1,744		
Labour	Ingram M. E. Mrs	1,730		
Conservative	Rose J. H. Dr	884		
Conservative	Cohen I.	883		
Conservative	Tait Z. M. Mrs	832		
Turnout			%	%
Labour gain from Conservative		Swing		
Labour gain from Conservative		Swing		
Labour gain from Conservative		Swing		
