= 1964 Hammersmith London Borough Council election =

1964 local election in England

1964 Hammersmith Borough Council election
7 May 1964	1968 →

All 60 seats to Hammersmith and Fulham London Borough Council 31 seats needed for a majority
- Turnout: 32.0%

	First party	Second party	Third party
Party	Labour	Conservative	Liberal
Seats won	53	7	0
Percentage	62.7%	33.9%	2.7%
Council control after election
Labour

The 1964 Hammersmith Council election took place on 7 May 1964 to elect members of Hammersmith London Borough Council in London, England. The whole council was up for election and the Labour party gained control of the council with almost 63% of the vote.

== Background ==
These elections were the first to the newly formed borough. Previously elections had taken place in the Metropolitan Borough of Hammersmith and Metropolitan Borough of Fulham. These boroughs were joined to form the new London Borough of Hammersmith by the London Government Act 1963.

A total of 134 candidates stood in the election for the 60 seats being contested across 21 wards. These included a full slate from the Conservative and Labour parties, while the Liberals stood 9 candidates. Other candidates included 5 from the Communist party. There were 18 three-seat wards and 3 two-seat wards.

This election had aldermen as well as directly elected councillors. Labour got 9 aldermen and the Conservatives 1.

The Council was elected in 1964 as a "shadow authority" but did not start operations until 1 April 1965.

== Election result ==
The results saw Labour gain the new council with a majority of 46 after winning 53 of the 60 seats. Overall turnout in the election was 32.0%. This turnout included 696 postal votes.

== Ward results ==
=== Addison ===
Addison (3)
Party	Candidate	Votes	%	±%
Labour	C. Parsons	1,025		
Labour	B. Sawbridge	1,021		
Labour	S. Ward	990		
Conservative	I. J. Lawrence	802		
Conservative	B. Walter	777		
Conservative	D. Fearn	768		
Communist	H. T. Goulding	118		
Turnout		1,880	27.3	
Labour win (new seat)				
Labour win (new seat)				
Labour win (new seat)				

=== Avonmore ===
Avonmore (2)
Party	Candidate	Votes	%	±%
Conservative	H. E. B. Brightley	1,122		
Conservative	J. A. Tagg	1,112		
Labour	S. R. Chriss	720		
Labour	J. C. Beckett	705		
Turnout		1,848	34.7	
Conservative win (new seat)				
Conservative win (new seat)				

=== Broadway ===
Broadway (3)
Party	Candidate	Votes	%	±%
Labour	G. E. Simpson	1,255		
Labour	C. W. Howard	1,250		
Labour	Miss J. Henry	1,170		
Liberal	S. H. J. A. Knott	1,004		
Liberal	R. J. Groves	820		
Liberal	C. Hildred-Goode	788		
Conservative	J. Brook	623		
Conservative	A. Belsham	595		
Conservative	Mrs. A. Hall	580		
Turnout		2,766	42.7	
Labour win (new seat)				
Labour win (new seat)				
Labour win (new seat)				

=== Brook Green ===
Brook Green (3)
Party	Candidate	Votes	%	±%
Conservative	A. Belsham	1,243		
Conservative	R. G. Field	1,200		
Conservative	L. W. Heading	1,183		
Labour	Mrs. M. Bamford	1,168		
Labour	G. Bunyan	1,155		
Labour	L. Stanley	1,145		
Turnout		2,409	36.1	
Conservative win (new seat)				
Conservative win (new seat)				
Conservative win (new seat)				

=== Colehill ===
Colehill (2)
Party	Candidate	Votes	%	±%
Labour	Mrs. G. I. Dimmick	1,257		
Labour	G. W. Dimmick	1,256		
Conservative	P. Dunphy	669		
Conservative	W. R. Hallam	646		
Turnout		1,946	38.3	
Labour win (new seat)				
Labour win (new seat)				

=== College Park & Old Oak ===
College Park & Old Oak (3)
Party	Candidate	Votes	%	±%
Labour	F. W. Ing	1,352		
Labour	R. Oak	1,351		
Labour	M. Silverman	1,342		
Conservative	Miss P. Oxley	191		
Conservative	R. Claxton	173		
Conservative	W. Simpson	168		
Turnout		1,557	22.2	
Labour win (new seat)				
Labour win (new seat)				
Labour win (new seat)				

=== Coningham ===
Coningham (3)
Party	Candidate	Votes	%	±%
Labour	L. W. Freeman	1,044		
Labour	Miss V. Grant	1,037		
Labour	Mrs. E. D. Freeman	1,035		
Conservative	J. Williams	306		
Conservative	C. Hagger	303		
Conservative	J. Wharram	292		
Turnout		1,380	22.3	
Labour win (new seat)				
Labour win (new seat)				
Labour win (new seat)				

=== Crabtree ===
Crabtree (3)
Party	Candidate	Votes	%	±%
Labour	Mrs. B. Little	1,703		
Labour	Mrs. E. F. Sears	1,702		
Labour	D. A. S. Noel	1,684		
Conservative	S. G. Peyton	1,383		
Conservative	Mrs. D. M. Joseph	1,381		
Conservative	D. A. Smith	1,349		
Liberal	F. C. Scrivener	184		
Liberal	Mrs. R. Black	181		
Liberal	H. Tucker	166		
Turnout		3,281	42.7	
Labour win (new seat)				
Labour win (new seat)				
Labour win (new seat)				

=== Gibbs Green ===
Gibbs Green (3)
Party	Candidate	Votes	%	±%
Labour	L. B. F. Jones	1,386		
Labour	H. H. Perlin	1,352		
Labour	Miss B. Boothroyd	1,347		
Conservative	L. Giovene	1,219		
Conservative	P. M. Longmore	1,218		
Conservative	G. Shell	1,193		
Communist	J. Edwards	99		
Communist	Mrs. J. Secker	71		
Turnout		2,666	35.2	
Labour win (new seat)				
Labour win (new seat)				
Labour win (new seat)				

=== Grove ===
Grove (3)
Party	Candidate	Votes	%	±%
Labour	T. Morris	1,409		
Labour	D. Murray	1,407		
Labour	E. R. Gosling	1,387		
Conservative	W. Sutton	847		
Conservative	H. Zander	826		
Conservative	C. Virando	823		
Turnout		2,221	30.8	
Labour win (new seat)				
Labour win (new seat)				
Labour win (new seat)				

=== Halford ===
Halford (3)
Party	Candidate	Votes	%	±%
Labour	J. H. Clark	1,512		
Labour	T. M. Cox	1,504		
Labour	H. R. Babstock	1,492		
Conservative	G. T. E. Grey	604		
Conservative	N. Parkinson	601		
Conservative	Dr. Sylvia Waters	598		
Turnout		2,129	32.7	
Labour win (new seat)				
Labour win (new seat)				
Labour win (new seat)				

=== Margravine ===
Margravine (3)
Party	Candidate	Votes	%	±%
Labour	F. W. Banfield	1,836		
Labour	Mrs. F. C. Pusey	1,826		
Labour	W. J. Molloy	1,816		
Conservative	J. C. Chapman	482		
Conservative	Mrs. M. M. Jarvis	480		
Conservative	B. A. Glister	467		
Turnout		2,339	35.0	
Labour win (new seat)				
Labour win (new seat)				
Labour win (new seat)				

=== Parsons Green ===
Parsons Green (3)
Party	Candidate	Votes	%	±%
Labour	D. T. King	1,610		
Labour	I. M. Jordan	1,608		
Labour	H. D. Duff	1,606		
Conservative	A. C. Hatton	1,204		
Conservative	K. G. F. Howe	1,204		
Conservative	Mrs. H. Hart	1,202		
Turnout		2,850	37.4	
Labour win (new seat)				
Labour win (new seat)				
Labour win (new seat)				

=== St Stephen's ===
St Stephen's (3)
Party	Candidate	Votes	%	±%
Labour	L. S. Jones	840		
Labour	J. Bull	836		
Labour	F. E. Keppel	830		
Conservative	H. Garner	352		
Conservative	Miss H. Ellis	348		
Conservative	Miss M. Gilling	342		
Turnout		1,218	19.1	
Labour win (new seat)				
Labour win (new seat)				
Labour win (new seat)				

=== Sandford ===
Sandford (3)
Party	Candidate	Votes	%	±%
Labour	J. M. Browning	1,808		
Labour	Miss P. M. Cooper	1,802		
Labour	P. J. Barton	1,751		
Conservative	Mrs. D. Fish	408		
Conservative	P. G. Humphreys	407		
Conservative	R. C. Trayhorn	402		
Communist	V. I. Boulton	217		
Turnout		2,303	29.1	
Labour win (new seat)				
Labour win (new seat)				
Labour win (new seat)				

=== Sherbrooke ===
Sherbrooke (2)
Party	Candidate	Votes	%	±%
Labour	S. A. Matthews	1,363		
Labour	Mrs. M. J. Noyes	1,346		
Conservative	A. S. Clarke	336		
Conservative	Miss J. Phillips	326		
Turnout		1,716	32.7	
Labour win (new seat)				
Labour win (new seat)				

=== Starch Green ===
Starch Green (3)
Party	Candidate	Votes	%	±%
Labour	A. G. Breeze	1,187		
Labour	Mrs. M. A. Havelka	1,161		
Conservative	J. Collins	1,154		
Labour	D. Horton	1,146		
Conservative	C. E. Arnold	1,122		
Conservative	Miss G. Powers	1,115		
Turnout		2,334	33.8	
Labour win (new seat)				
Labour win (new seat)				
Conservative win (new seat)				

=== Sulivan ===
Sulivan (3)
Party	Candidate	Votes	%	±%
Labour	M. A. Hall	1,630		
Labour	A. R. L. Chapman	1,605		
Labour	Mrs. C. J. Liardet	1,600		
Conservative	S. N. B. Leishman	803		
Conservative	Mrs. H. Curtis	799		
Conservative	Miss J. Whyman	772		
Turnout		2,425	32.9	
Labour win (new seat)				
Labour win (new seat)				
Labour win (new seat)				

=== Town ===
Town (3)
Party	Candidate	Votes	%	±%
Labour	I. Gray	1,396		
Labour	M. House	1,356		
Conservative	B. J. Hill	1,324		
Labour	E. L. Hill	924		
Conservative	C. J. Clarke	908		
Conservative	C. Bland	877		
Liberal	M. Ridd	129		
Liberal	G. H. Stevens	124		
Liberal	Mrs. J. M. Stevens	110		
Turnout		2,420	34.7	
Labour win (new seat)				
Labour win (new seat)				
Conservative win (new seat)				

=== White City ===
White City (3)
Party	Candidate	Votes	%	±%
Labour	R. Beresford	1,480		
Labour	Mrs. D. Heakes	1,470		
Labour	F. Williams	1,453		
Conservative	Miss J. Beattie	243		
Conservative	Mrs. K. Walter	240		
Conservative	Miss R. Palompo	235		
Communist	W. Massey	130		
Turnout		1,783	25.7	
Labour win (new seat)				
Labour win (new seat)				
Labour win (new seat)				

=== Wormholt ===
Wormholt (3)
Party	Candidate	Votes	%	±%
Labour	Mrs. V. Freeman	1,228		
Labour	Mrs. R. Hounsome	1,222		
Labour	C. Van Gelderen	1,206		
Conservative	Miss H. Lewis	427		
Conservative	C. Sands	423		
Conservative	Miss P. Walker	410		
Turnout		1,673	26.9	
Labour win (new seat)				
Labour win (new seat)				
Labour win (new seat)				
