= 1986 Hammersmith and Fulham London Borough Council election =

1986 local election in England

1986 Hammersmith and Fulham Borough Council election
- 8 May 1986

All 50 seats to Hammersmith and Fulham London Borough Council 26 seats needed for a majority
- Turnout: 51.8% (▲1.8%)

	First party	Second party	Third party
Party	Labour	Conservative	Alliance
Last election	25 seats, 37.0%	23 seats, 39.1%	2 seats, 20.6%
Seats won	40	9	1
Seat change	▲15	▼14	▼1
Popular vote	25,545	17,123	6,939
Percentage	50.4%	33.8%	13.7%
Swing	▲13.4%	▼5.3%	▼6.9%
- Map of the results of the 1986 Hammersmith and Fulham council election. Conservatives in blue and Labour in red.
Council control before election
No overall control
Council control after election
Labour

The 1986 Hammersmith and Fulham Council election took place on 8 May 1986 to elect members of Hammersmith and Fulham London Borough Council in London, England. The whole council was up for election and the Labour party gained overall control of the council.

== Background ==
Labour, the Conservatives and the SDP Liberal Alliance all fielded a full slate of 50 candidates. On the ballot paper the third-party candidates were listed alternatively as 'SDP-Liberal Alliance' and 'Liberal Alliance-SDP'.

The Humanist Party ran seven candidates - two each in Gibbs Green, Normand and Avonmore wards and a further one in Margravine. Across London the party ran a further 11 candidates at this election - averaging 43 votes per candidate.

The Green Party ran a single candidate in six wards - Colehill, Crabtree, Palace, Sherbrooke, Town, White City & Shepherds Bush. At the previous election the Ecology Party had fielded four candidates in different wards. Across London at this election the Green Party ran a further 161 candidates.

Four candidates listed themselves under the 'Village Independent' banner - two each in Addison and Brook Green wards.

The Revolutionary Communist Party ran a single candidate - in White City & Shepherds Bush ward. Across London they ran a further 10 candidates - averaging 68 votes per person.

No candidates listed themselves as representing the Residents Association - down from seven at the previous election.

The Workers Revolutionary Party didn't field any candidates - down from two at the previous election.

The National Front didn't field any candidates - down from two at the previous election.

A total of 168 candidates put themselves forward for the 50 available seats - a decrease from the 175 candidates who contested the previous election.

== Election result ==
The Labour Party won 40 seats - a gain of 15 seats from the 1982 result, and took control of the council. The Conservative Party won 9 seats - a loss of 14 seats from their 1982 result.

The SDP Liberal Alliance retained 1 seat and lost 1 seat. This was the seventh and final election for the Liberal candidate Simon Knott - and his fourth victory. He also stood as a candidate for the House of Commons four times for the Barons Court constituency, three times for the Hammersmith North constituency and twice for the Hammersmith constituency, without success.

== Ward results ==
=== Addison ===
Addison (2)
Party	Candidate	Votes	%	±%
Labour	Jeffrey Kenner	1,300	55.6%	
Labour	Bridget T Prentice	1,255		
Conservative	Belsham, Frances EJ.	730	30.3%	
Conservative	McCraith, David C.	664		
Alliance	Wilson, Christine A.	238	10.3%	
Alliance	Cullen, Sean P.G.	237		
Village Independent	Constable, David A.	93	3.7%	
Village Independent	Mockler, Anthony P.	78		
Turnout			59.6%	%
Labour gain from Conservative		Swing		
Labour gain from Conservative		Swing		

=== Avonmore ===
Avonmore (2)
Party	Candidate	Votes	%	±%
Labour	Sally A.V. Powell	831	47.4%	
Labour	Iain Coleman	800		
Conservative	Putnam, John C.	742	42.0%	
Conservative	Burns, Simon H.M.	704		
Alliance	Harrison, Trevor K.	173	10.0%	
Alliance	Orr, Michael W.M.	170		
Humanist	Adjina, Leith H.	14	0.7%	
Humanist	Mohamed, Ali	10		
Turnout			46.2%	%
Labour gain from Conservative		Swing		
Labour gain from Conservative		Swing		

=== Broadway ===
Broadway (2)
Party	Candidate	Votes	%	±%
Alliance	Simon H.J.A. Knott	908	41.7%	
Labour	John H. Gorter	867	43.9%	
Labour	Parry, Stephen W.	852		
Alliance	Mulcahy, Robert	724		
Conservative	Carswell, Richard J.	286	14.4%	
Conservative	Portham, Richard J.R.	280		
Turnout			55.8%	%
Alliance hold		Swing		
Labour gain from Alliance		Swing		

=== Brook Green ===
Brook Green (2)
Party	Candidate	Votes	%	±%
Conservative	John A. Hennessy	886	39.3%	
Conservative	Peter C. Prince	803		
Labour	Jones, Leslie S.	704	32.7%	
Labour	Tranchell, Louanne	701		
Alliance	Barnett, Gerald D.G.	421	19.6%	
Alliance	Sutherland, Deborah M.	421		
Village Independent	Logue, Anne	185	8.3%	
Village Independent	Marsh, Gwendoline M.	173		
Turnout			52.4%	%
Conservative hold		Swing		
Conservative hold		Swing		

=== Colehill ===
Colehill (2)
Party	Candidate	Votes	%	±%
Labour	Susan P. Brown	1,006	43.3%	
Labour	Lipscomb, Thomas	962		
Conservative	McGrath, Terence T.	926	40.5%	
Conservative	Pickthorn, James P.M.	916		
Alliance	Dowden, Gerald Arthur	195	8.3%	
Alliance	Killick, Robert C.	182		
Green	Burgess, Oliver	178	7.8%	
Turnout			54.2%	%
Labour gain from Conservative		Swing		
Labour gain from Conservative		Swing		

=== College Park & Old Oak ===
College Park & Old Oak (3)
Party	Candidate	Votes	%	±%
Labour	Melvyn Silverman	1,488	69.6%	
Labour	Diana Basterfield	1,467		
Labour	Gordon Prentice	1,421		
Conservative	Clarke, Ian C.	477	21.8%	
Conservative	Chichester, Giles B.	470		
Conservative	Maze, Brian I.	426		
Alliance	Bruce Douglas-Mann	201	8.5%	
Alliance	Knott, Josephine	179		
Alliance	Swaby, Suzanne	156		
Turnout			41.9%	%
Labour hold		Swing		
Labour hold		Swing		
Labour hold		Swing		

=== Coningham ===
Coningham (3)
Party	Candidate	Votes	%	±%
Labour	James Bull	1,784	67.5%	
Labour	Joseph S. Mirwitch	1,696		
Labour	Conrad G. Rubin	1,667		
Conservative	Hardy, Peter R.H.	507	19.0%	
Conservative	Collings, Matthew G.B.	497		
Conservative	Waterson, Nigel C.	447		
Alliance	Douglas-Mann, Susanna	370	13.4%	
Alliance	Shuttleworth, Sheila J.	352		
Alliance	Allen, Harold V.	300		
Turnout			44.1%	%
Labour hold		Swing		
Labour hold		Swing		
Labour hold		Swing		

=== Crabtree ===
Crabtree (2)
Party	Candidate	Votes	%	±%
Labour	Marilyn M. Naden	1,025	46.1%	
Labour	Sally L. Whitman	972		
Conservative	Brierley, Andrew D.	944	43.4%	
Conservative	Fitzgerald, Patricia A.	935		
Alliance	Macdonald, Hector I.	180	7.6%	
Alliance	Klimiashvilly, Tamara	150		
Green	Jones, Antony	64	3.0%	
Turnout			56.9%	%
Labour gain from Conservative		Swing		
Labour gain from Conservative		Swing		

=== Eel Brook ===
Eel Brook (2)
Party	Candidate	Votes	%	±%
Labour	Ian J. Harrison	1,096	50.4%	
Labour	Judith A. Atkinson	1,083		
Conservative	Killick, Marcus C.	927	41.7%	
Conservative	Windridge, Michael H.	877		
Alliance	Piper, Ian J.	182	7.8%	
Alliance	Wilson, Edward M.	156		
Turnout			58.2%	%
Labour hold		Swing		
Labour hold		Swing		

=== Gibbs Green ===
Gibbs Green (2)
Party	Candidate	Votes	%	±%
Labour	Syed Kabir	1,172	63.1%	
Labour	Andrew F. Slaughter	1,131		
Conservative	Hawkins, Nigel B.S.	487	26.5%	
Conservative	Gray, Ashley J.R.	481		
Alliance	Bewley, Alexandra M.	173	9.3%	
Alliance	Martin, Russell N.D.	168		
Humanist	Dredge, Julie H.	24	1.1%	
Humanist	McDonald, Paul W.	16		
Turnout			48.1%	%
Labour hold		Swing		
Labour hold		Swing		

=== Grove ===
Grove (2)
Party	Candidate	Votes	%	±%
Labour	Vivienne J. Lukey	1,003	50.3%	
Labour	Hugh Thomson	1,000		
Conservative	Manson, Cole	675	31.7%	
Conservative	Sharif, Muhammad	589		
Alliance	Hayhoe, Thomas E.G.	372	18.0%	
Alliance	Davies, Angela T.	344		
Turnout			53.7%	%
Labour hold		Swing		
Labour hold		Swing		

=== Margravine ===
Margravine (2)
Party	Candidate	Votes	%	±%
Labour	David J. Dunwoody	1,288	66.9%	
Labour	Margaret E. Ingram	1,179		
Conservative	Gibson, Andrew G.	454	24.1%	
Conservative	Green, Robert O.M.	434		
Alliance	Hall, Phillip	158	8.3%	
Alliance	Bonser, Leonard T.	148		
Humanist	Abou Zied, Alha	12	0.7%	
Turnout			49.8%	%
Labour hold		Swing		
Labour hold		Swing		

=== Normand ===
Normand (2)
Party	Candidate	Votes	%	±%
Labour	Eleanor J. Caruana	1,328	59.6%	
Labour	Brian E. Vaughan	1,271		
Conservative	Roberts, Peter W.	600	26.6%	
Conservative	Thorp, David A.R.	560		
Alliance	Davies, Rolson J.	287	12.8%	
Alliance	Howells, Ina J.G.	269		
Humanist	Carrick, Lana Q.Y.	27	1.0%	
Humanist	Hicks, Paul L.	18		
Turnout			53.7%	%
Labour hold		Swing		
Labour hold		Swing		

=== Palace ===
Palace (2)
Party	Candidate	Votes	%	±%
Conservative	Richard G. Hoddinott	1,370	63.2%	
Conservative	Emile P. Al-Uzaizi	1,369		
Labour	Hammocks, James	488	22.1%	
Labour	Payne, Charles	469		
Alliance	Frisby, Terence P.M.	216	9.8%	
Alliance	Jacques, David L.	210		
Green	Grimes, Janet	106	4.9%	
Turnout			57.5%	%
Conservative hold		Swing		
Conservative hold		Swing		

=== Ravenscourt ===
Ravenscourt (2)
Party	Candidate	Votes	%	±%
Conservative	Angela Clarke	824	39.4%	
Labour	Patricia M. Migdal	758	37.7%	
Conservative	McCrone, Michael	740		
Labour	Abbott, Jacqueline	739		
Alliance	Wilson, Fiona	456	22.9%	
Alliance	Mallinson, Keith A.	455		
Turnout			52.8%	%
Conservative hold		Swing		
Labour gain from Conservative		Swing		

=== Sands End ===
Sands End (2)
Party	Candidate	Votes	%	±%
Labour	Anthony F.W. Powell	1,106	52.2%	
Labour	Michael N. Goodman	1,096		
Conservative	Bell, Robert	569	26.2%	
Conservative	Johnson, Celia	537		
Alliance	Bonser, Joan	462	21.6%	
Alliance	McNamee, Mary	449		
Turnout			50.7%	%
Labour hold		Swing		
Labour hold		Swing		

=== Sherbrooke ===
Sherbrooke (2)
Party	Candidate	Votes	%	±%
Labour	Ian Gray	946	53.9%	
Labour	Nicholas P. Moore	920		
Conservative	Searson, Arthur G.	631	36.0%	
Conservative	Sibley, Elizabeth A.	615		
Alliance	Slingsby, Sally A.	151	8.5%	
Alliance	Brownrigg, Henry C.Q.	144		
Green	Warner, Jacqueline	29	1.7%	
Turnout			51.0%	%
Labour gain from Conservative		Swing		
Labour hold		Swing		

=== Starch Green ===
Starch Green (2)
Party	Candidate	Votes	%	±%
Labour	Janet O. Adegoke	993	46.4%	
Labour	Timothy R. Sedgwick-Jell	983		
Conservative	Ward, Patricia J.	640	29.6%	
Conservative	Moss, Philip J.	622		
Alliance	McCourt, Ian	514	24.0%	
Alliance	Dewey, Clive G.	510		
Turnout			57.2%	%
Labour hold		Swing		
Labour gain from Conservative		Swing		

=== Sulivan ===
Sulivan (2)
Party	Candidate	Votes	%	±%
Conservative	Guy F.C. Roberts	1,034	46.9%	
Conservative	Gerald A Wombwell	1,032		
Labour	Bird, Brendan J.	934	41.7%	
Labour	Bates, Francine L.	903		
Alliance	Baker, Ellen R.	258	11.5%	
Alliance	Duff, Hugh D.	247		
Turnout			56.6%	%
Conservative hold		Swing		
Conservative hold		Swing		

=== Town ===
Town (2)
Party	Candidate	Votes	%	±%
Conservative	Diana J. Fawcett	1,069	49.1%	
Conservative	Fiona A.R. McGregor	1,027		
Labour	Bureau, Janet H.	822	37.5%	
Labour	Fenyoe, Raymond H.	782		
Alliance	Brett, Alastair J.	208	9.5%	
Alliance	Elton, Jacqueline S.	197		
Green	Jenkins, Jennifer M.	84	3.9%	
Turnout			51.3%	%
Conservative hold		Swing		
Conservative hold		Swing		

=== Walham ===
Walham (2)
Party	Candidate	Votes	%	±%
Labour	Valerie A.E. Barker	1,117	48.7%	
Labour	Daniel A. Filson	1,089		
Conservative	Chiesman, Diana P.A.	1022	43.8%	
Conservative	Rudge, Robert M.	960		
Alliance	Graham, John R.	175	7.5%	
Alliance	Davies, Peter J.	164		
Turnout			50.8%	%
Labour gain from Conservative		Swing		
Labour gain from Conservative		Swing		

=== White City & Shepherds Bush ===
White City & Shepherds Bush (3)
Party	Candidate	Votes	%	±%
Labour	Ivan A. Gibbons	1,941	71.3%	
Labour	Ronald E. Browne	1,880		
Labour	Abu S. Khalad	1,671		
Conservative	Bradley, John C.B.	328	11.4%	
Conservative	Green, Damian H.	312		
Alliance	Carlisle, Hamish M.	249	8.3%	
Conservative	Malhotra, Manohar L.	238		
Alliance	Curran, Patricia	205		
Alliance	Duignan, Mary	188		
Green	Kirk, Dav.	150	5.8%	
Revolutionary Communist	Foster, Fiona B.	82	3.2%	
Turnout			47.0%	%
Labour hold		Swing		
Labour hold		Swing		
Labour hold		Swing		

=== Wormholt ===
Wormholt (3)
Party	Candidate	Votes	%	±%
Labour	Rohan Collier	1,548	54.7%	
Labour	Colin Aherne	1,542		
Labour	Kenneth G. Martindale	1,534		
Conservative	Smith, William C.	995	32.9%	
Conservative	Roberts, Sally A.E.	913		
Conservative	Sehgal, Suraj P.	870		
Alliance	Connaughton, Margaret A.	392	12.4%	
Alliance	Bymell, Victoria H.	332		
Alliance	Bryant, Martin W.	326		
Turnout			52.1%	%
Labour hold		Swing		
Labour hold		Swing		
Labour gain from Conservative		Swing		
