= 1978 Hammersmith London Borough Council election =

1978 local election in England

1978 Hammersmith Borough Council election
- 4 May 1978

All 50 seats to Hammersmith and Fulham London Borough Council 26 seats needed for a majority
- Turnout: 47.6% (▲6.3%)

	First party	Second party	Third party
Party	Conservative	Labour	Liberal
Last election	10 seats, 35.5%	48 seats, 56.0%	2 seats, 7.0%
Seats won	24	24	2
Seat change	▲14	▼24	Steady
Popular vote	24,048	22,296	2,521
Percentage	47.6%	45.6%	3.9%
Swing	▲11.1%	▼11.0%	▼3.1%
- Map of the results of the 1978 Hammersmith council election. Conservatives in blue and Labour in red.
Council control before election
Labour
Council control after election
No overall control

The 1978 Hammersmith Council election took place on 4 May 1978 to elect members of Hammersmith London Borough Council in London, England. The whole council was up for election, with an extra two wards and 10 fewer councillors - and the council went in no overall control.

== Background ==
The number of council seats was reduced from 60 to 50 - with the new council comprising 19 two seat wards, and 4 three seat wards.

Both Labour and the Conservatives fielded a full slate of 50 candidates.

The Liberal Party ran 20 candidates across 15 wards - an increase from the 19 candidates they fielded in 1974.

The National Front fielded 14 candidates across 7 wards - gaining an average of 81 votes each. Across London the National Front ran 602 candidates - pulling in an average of 151 votes each.

The 'Save London Alliance' ran 18 candidates across 12 wards in a variety of alliances with 'West Kensington Environment' (9 candidates), 'Ratepayers Association' (2 candidates), 'Glenthorne Road Campaign' (1 candidate) and without additional alliance (6 candidates). Across London 80 other candidates stood under the 'Save London Alliance' banner.

In the White City & Shepherd's Bush ward three candidates stood for 'Socialist Unity' - a further 9 candidates across London stood for the same party.

In the same ward a single candidate stood for the Workers Revolutionary Party - the party fielded a further 15 candidates across London.

In an era when candidates could choose their party designation without reference to an officially registered entity - one person in the Broadway ward ran under the 'Retired Garage Proprietor' banner. He finished just ahead of the National Front and Save London Alliance candidates.

One candidate in the Coleshill ward stood as an 'Independent Conservative' - across London, four other candidates used the same party name.

In the Wormholt ward a single candidate stood for the 'British United Party' - two other candidates across London used the same banner.

Whilst Communist Party fielded 97 candidates across London at these elections - none stood in Hammersmith.

No candidates in Hammersmith listed themselves as 'Independent' at this election.

A total of 159 candidates put themselves forward for the 50 available seats - an increase from the 145 candidates who contested the 60 seats in 1974.

== Election result ==
The Conservative Party won 24 seats and the Labour Party also won 24 seats. With just two seats, the Liberal Party held the balance of power with no party in overall control.

The two Liberal councillors voted with the Conservatives and removed Labour, after 8 years in control of Hammersmith.

== Ward results ==
=== Addison ===
Addison (2)
Party	Candidate	Votes	%	±%
Conservative	Belsham, Frances E.J	1,095		
Conservative	Chase, Simon G.	1,062		
Labour	Cunningham, Edward D.	1,037		
Labour	Moriarty, Denis E.H.	918		
National Front	Cresswell, Jocelyn	60		
National Front	Cox, Albert L.	51		
Save London Alliance	Fogarty, Michael J.E.	46		
Turnout			%	%

=== Avonmore ===
Avonmore (2)
Party	Candidate	Votes	%	±%
Conservative	Putnam, John C.	1,222		
Conservative	Wylie, John C.	1,139		
Labour	Basterfield, Diana	627		
Labour	Norridge, Adrian M.	608		
West Kensington Environment/ Save London Alliance	Powell, Isobel	130		
Liberal	Orr, Michael W.M.	106		
Turnout			%	%

=== Broadway ===
Broadway (2)
Party	Candidate	Votes	%	±%
Liberal	Knott, Simon H.J.A.	916		
Liberal	Mulcahy, Robert	693		
Labour	Hanscomb, Louis	566		
Labour	Wicks, Josephine A.	509		
Conservative	Martin, Elizabeth A.	428		
Conservative	Robertson, David J.	402		
Retired Garage Proprietor	Keats, Joseph C.	58		
National Front	Chambers, Eamon M	50		
National Front	Sturman, David	49		
West Kensington Environment/ Save London Alliance	Patriotis, Costas	26		
Turnout			%	%

=== Brook Green ===
Brook Green (2)
Party	Candidate	Votes	%	±%
Conservative	Hennessy, John A.	1,416		
Conservative	Smith, William C.	1,384		
Labour	Young, John A.	758		
Labour	Burke, Patrick	754		
West Kensington Environment/ Save London Alliance	Copplestone, Frederick T.	89		
West Kensington Environment/ Save London Alliance	Molony, John F.	88		
Turnout			%	%

=== Colehill ===
Colehill (2)
Party	Candidate	Votes	%	±%
Conservative	Hitchings, Ann M	1,177		
Conservative	Killick, Robert C.	1,175		
Labour	Prentice, Gordon	1,089		
Labour	Widdowson, Robert	977		
Ind. Conservative	Perrin, Raymond A.	228		
Liberal	Carroll, Moira	89		
Turnout			%	%

=== College Park & Old Oak ===
College Park & Old Oak (3)
Party	Candidate	Votes	%	±%
Labour	Ing, Frank W	1,117		
Labour	Fenelon, Margaret	1,065		
Labour	Silverman, Melvyn	1,038		
Conservative	Herbert, Fredrick P.A.	950		
Conservative	Gordon, Helen T.	935		
Conservative	Maze, Brian I.	901		
National Front	Morris, Eric A.	135		
National Front	Mullett, Horace	113		
Turnout			%	%

=== Coningham ===
Coningham (3)
Party	Candidate	Votes	%	±%
Labour	Crawford, Ethel F.	1,235		
Labour	Bull, James	1,205		
Labour	Wicks, Leslie J.	1,136		
Conservative	Thorne, Brenda	932		
Conservative	Clarke, Richard J.	915		
Conservative	Thorne, Christopher G.	915		
Turnout			%	%

=== Crabtree ===
Crabtree (2)
Party	Candidate	Votes	%	±%
Conservative	Howe, Kim G.F.B.	1,211		
Conservative	Pearce, John	1,185		
Labour	Evans, John G.	830		
Labour	Banfield, Dorothy J.	829		
Liberal	Bevan, David G.	122		
Turnout			%	%

=== Eel Brook ===
Eel Brook (2)
Party	Candidate	Votes	%	±%
Conservative	Sandeman, Phillipa M.	1,083		
Conservative	Lazarus, Richard S.	1,067		
Labour	Rayner, Richard W.	1,055		
Labour	Radcliffe, Rosemary A.	1,052		
Liberal	Simpson, David J.	93		
National Front	Merrick, John W.	78		
Turnout			%	%

=== Gibbs Green ===
Gibbs Green (2)
Party	Candidate	Votes	%	±%
Labour	Kelly, Frances D.	986		
Labour	Taylor, Geoffrey	968		
Conservative	Corbet-Millward, John G.	852		
Conservative	Wethered, Simon R.	807		
Ratepayers Association/ Save London Alliance	Dove, Geoffrey A.W.	113		
West Kensington Environment/ Save London Alliance	Dunnet, Sylvia J.	100		
Liberal	Bonser, Joan	68		
Turnout			%	%

=== Grove ===
Grove (2)
Party	Candidate	Votes	%	±%
Labour	Clark, Stephen P.	984		
Labour	Clark, Jennifer A.	957		
Conservative	Claxton, Angela F.I.	937		
Conservative	Lyons, Raymond M.	856		
Glenthorne Road Campaign/ Save London Alliance	Kane, Geoffrey H.	215		
Turnout			%	%

=== Margravine ===
Margravine (2)
Party	Candidate	Votes	%	±%
Labour	Champion, Thomas H.	958		
Labour	Spiers, William C.	878		
Conservative	Bell, Andrew R.M.	530		
Conservative	Moies, Faraj	487		
Liberal	Bonser, Leonard T.	53		
National Front	Crane, David W.	51		
West Kensington Environment/ Save London Alliance	Hampton, Rosamund	34		
West Kensington Environment/ Save London Alliance	Rowe, Michael R.	26		
Turnout			%	%

=== Normand ===
Normand (2)
Party	Candidate	Votes	%	±%
Labour	Caruana, Eleanor J.	1,103		
Labour	Unwin, Stephen W.	1,095		
Conservative	Harben, John B.	1,013		
Conservative	Walsh, Adrian N.	1,007		
National Front	Gadd, James J.	98		
National Front	Richards, Brian G.	87		
West Kensington Environment/ Save London Alliance	Burnaby, Charles D.K.	48		
Liberal	Oxford, Diana C.	43		
West Kensington Environment/ Save London Alliance	Lamden, Derek	40		
Turnout			%	%

=== Palace ===
Palace (2)
Party	Candidate	Votes	%	±%
Conservative	Jackson, Andrew R	1,746		
Conservative	Leishman, Stuart N.B.	1,746		
Labour	Dimmick, George W.	547		
Labour	Steinhart, Julia L.	522		
Liberal	Dowden, Gerald Arthur	126		
Liberal	Kent, Richard M.	118		
Save London Alliance	Flower, Sibylla J.	42		
Save London Alliance	Eliot, Teresa A.	39		
Turnout			%	%

=== Ravenscourt ===
Ravenscourt (2)
Party	Candidate	Votes	%	±%
Conservative	Christopher, Michael B.	1,270		
Conservative	Jarvis, Clement W.	1,270		
Labour	Gosling, Eric R.	634		
Labour	Browne, Ronald E.	588		
National Front	Pearse, Robert L.J.	41		
Turnout			%	%

=== Sands End ===
Sands End (2)
Party	Candidate	Votes	%	±%
Labour	Powell, Anthony F.W.	1,134		
Labour	Feely, Joseph U.	1,129		
Conservative	Miller, Marjorie C.	678		
Conservative	Lumsden, Charles J.	670		
Liberal	Merrall, Robert W.	69		
Save London Alliance	Hobbs, Linda	53		
Turnout			%	%

=== Sherbrooke ===
Sherbrooke (2)
Party	Candidate	Votes	%	±%
Labour	Duff, Hugh D.	1,001		
Labour	Gray, Ian	989		
Conservative	Hardwick, Geoffrey H.E.	798		
Conservative	McWilliams, James	726		
Ratepayers Association/ Save London Alliance	Blackmun, Arthur W.	97		
Liberal	Allen, Carol M.	63		
Save London Alliance	Cunningham, Joseph C.	59		
Turnout			%	%

=== Starch Green ===
Starch Green (2)
Party	Candidate	Votes	%	±%
Conservative	Hutson, Eric J.	1,061		
Conservative	Ward, Patricia J.	1,053		
Labour	Johnson, Rosina M.	934		
Labour	Jones, Leslie S.A.	894		
Turnout			%	%

=== Sulivan ===
Sulivan (2)
Party	Candidate	Votes	%	±%
Conservative	Roche, Sir David O'G.	1,264		
Conservative	Ibbott, Ernest C.	1,257		
Labour	Gorter, Hendrick J.	947		
Labour	Godden, Vera	944		
Liberal	Rendel, David D.	305		
Liberal	Roberts, Nia L.	234		
Turnout			%	%

=== Town ===
Town (2)
Party	Candidate	Votes	%	±%
Conservative	McGregor, Fiona A.R.	1,508		
Conservative	Warner, Courtney F	1,415		
Labour	Hilliard, Leslie H.	961		
Labour	Lock, Andrew R.	912		
Liberal	Carroll, Vincent	103		
Save London Alliance	Carter, Aurea J.	94		
Turnout			%	%

=== Walham ===
Walham (2)
Party	Candidate	Votes	%	±%
Conservative	Chiesman, Diana P.A.	1,149		
Conservative	Browne, Nicholas N.	1,121		
Labour	Start, David A.	947		
Labour	Sondergaard, Margaret J.N.	924		
Liberal	Rahman, Shaiki A.	60		
Turnout			%	%

=== White City & Shepherds Bush ===
White City & Shepherds Bush (3)
Party	Candidate	Votes	%	±%
Labour	Beresford, Randolph	1,593		
Labour	Braggins, Gwendoline	1,493		
Labour	De Gory, Peter D.	1,415		
Conservative	Barnard, Marjorie	607		
Conservative	Mooney, Susan G.	596		
Conservative	Sharif, Muhammad	526		
Workers Revolutionary	Stewart, Calvin L.M.	114		
Socialist Unity	Hill, Virginia J.M.	96		
Socialist Unity	Truscott, Catherine	57		
Socialist Unity	Van Gelderen, Charles	50		
Turnout			%	%

=== Wormholt ===
Wormholt (3)
Party	Candidate	Votes	%	±%
Labour	Breeze, Alan G.	1,253		
Labour	Best, Mary S.	1,231		
Labour	Ingram, Margaret E.	1,137		
Conservative	Booth, Sydney J.P.	1,121		
Conservative	Learmouth, Alan R.	974		
Conservative	Khan, Khalil A.K.	887		
Liberal	Knott, Josephine	305		
Liberal	Connaughton, Margaret A.	300		
Liberal	Cullen, Sean G.	261		
National Front	Cameron, Alistair I.S.	126		
National Front	Heale, Martyn C.	108		
National Front	Sawyer, James	84		
British United Party	Edwards, Robert H.	54		
Turnout			%	%
