= 1968 Hammersmith London Borough Council election =

1968 local election in England

1968 Hammersmith Borough Council election
- 9 May 1968

All 60 seats to Hammersmith and Fulham London Borough Council 31 seats needed for a majority
- Turnout: 39.1% (▲7.1%)

	First party	Second party	Third party
Party	Conservative	Labour	Liberal
Seats before	6	54	0
Seats won	54	6	0
Seat change	▲48	▼48	0
Percentage	58.2%	38.9%	2.3%
Swing	▲24.3%	▼23.8%	▼0.4%
Council control before election
Labour
Council control after election
Conservative

The 1968 Hammersmith Council election took place on 9 May 1968 to elect members of Hammersmith London Borough Council in London, England. The whole council was up for election and the Conservative Party gained overall control of the council.

== Background ==
These took place at the height of the unpopularity of the Labour Government. In Hammersmith from 52 Labour, 7 Conservative and 1 Liberal councillors at the commencement of the election the Conservatives, masterminded by John Putnam and Seton Forbes-Cockell (both of whom were elected Aldermen), won in every ward except White City, with two sitting Labour Councillors in Margravine and one in Sherbrooke elected in split votes.

It is generally accepted that the Conservative Party in Hammersmith have never had as talented a group as in 1968. Of the newly elected councillors David Ashby and Patrick Ground went on to Parliament, Ben Patterson to the European Parliament, Christopher Horne fought and lost twice. Jack Rose, a popular local GP, was for many years the Chairman of the British branch of Gamblers Anonymous. The business experience of Stuart Leishman, Kim Howe, John Akerman, Paul Dwyer, Peter Fane and Sir George Bull, together with the above mentioned Aldermen led to a business renaissance in the borough, which was cut short by Ted Heath's appalling unpopularity in 1971, and the excellent organisation of Labour agent Leslie Hilliard CBE, which led to all but two - one of whom Reg Simmerson promptly resigned from the party - being defeated.

Sir Samuel Salmon, the Chairman of J Lyons and Co., then a major local employer, Seton Forbes-Cockell and Gordon Field - the last after an abrasive and divisive election - served as Mayors from 1968 to 1971; William Smith and John Putman subsequently returned to the Council and were also elected Mayors.

Others were not so successful; bankrupt builder John Duff disappeared within months of the election; ILEA representative Simon de Voghelaere faced similar financial trouble, and Nick Bryce-Smith subsequently became involved in the Bradstock Insurance scandal.

In April 1987 Joan Caruana, Mayor of Hammersmith, hosted a gathering attended by 44 former members, officers and others connected with the 1968-71 council; it was the last public appearance of Lord Stewart of Fulham.

== Election result ==
The Conservatives reversed the 1964 result winning 54 of the 60 seats, with 58% of the votes cast.

== Ward results ==
=== Addison ===
Addison (3)
Party	Candidate	Votes	%	±%
Conservative	Arthur Belsham	1,244	62.7%	
Conservative	Eleanor Belsham	1,223		
Conservative	Douglas Ward	1,192		
Labour	Ms P Alsten	708	35.7%	
Labour	P Martin	693		
Labour	A Braggins	693		
Communist	H Goulding	96	1.6%	
Turnout			35.9%	
Conservative gain from Labour		Swing		
Conservative gain from Labour		Swing		
Conservative gain from Labour		Swing		

=== Avonmore ===
Avonmore (2)
Party	Candidate	Votes	%	±%
Conservative	Harold Branton Brightley	1,622	78.6%	
Conservative	Reg Simmerson	1,609		
Labour	I McCourt	443	21.4%	
Labour	F Foes	435		
Turnout			39.9%	
Conservative hold		Swing		
Conservative hold		Swing		

=== Broadway ===
Broadway (3)
Party	Candidate	Votes	%	±%
Conservative	Sir George Bull	1,128	40.9%	
Conservative	Elizabeth Goodden	1,038		
Conservative	John Pearce Gould	1,020		
Liberal	Simon Knott	962	29.5%	
Labour	George Simpson	793	29.6%	
Labour	Mrs M Clarke	780		
Labour	C Howard	736		
Liberal	E Warren	683		
Liberal	R Groves	656		
Turnout			44.5%	
Conservative gain from Liberal		Swing		
Conservative gain from Labour		Swing		
Conservative gain from Labour		Swing		

=== Brook Green ===
Brook Green (3)
Party	Candidate	Votes	%	±%
Conservative	Gavin Tait	1,533	64.7%	
Conservative	Gordon Field	1,521		
Conservative	Leslie Heading	1,520		
Labour	J Headington	845	35.3%	
Labour	R Philpot	845		
Labour	R Bowles	821		
Turnout			39.6%	
Conservative hold		Swing		
Conservative hold		Swing		
Conservative hold		Swing		

=== Colehill ===
Colehill (2)
Party	Candidate	Votes	%	±%
Conservative	Kim Howe	1,056	58.4%	
Conservative	Molly Porter	1,021		
Labour	Mrs George Dimmick	705	39.4%	
Labour	George Dimmick	696		
Communist	G Hicks	78	2.2%	
Turnout			40.3%	
Conservative gain from Labour		Swing		
Conservative gain from Labour		Swing		

=== College Park & Old Oak ===
College Park & Old Oak (3)
Party	Candidate	Votes	%	±%
Conservative	Rodney Bowler	937	53.6%	
Conservative	Francis Cherry	934		
Conservative	Kathy Boughton	911		
Labour	Frank Ing	818	46.4%	
Labour	M Silverman	799		
Labour	H Perlin	790		
Turnout			30.2%	
Conservative gain from Labour		Swing		
Conservative gain from Labour		Swing		
Conservative gain from Labour		Swing		

=== Coningham ===
Coningham (3)
Party	Candidate	Votes	%	±%
Conservative	Irene York	852	55.5%	
Conservative	Henry Hammond	848		
Conservative	Tony Barker	840		
Labour	E Freeman	683	44.5%	
Labour	L Freeman	679		
Labour	M Havelka	676		
Turnout			33.5%	
Conservative gain from Labour		Swing		
Conservative gain from Labour		Swing		
Conservative gain from Labour		Swing		

=== Crabtree ===
Crabtree (3)
Party	Candidate	Votes	%	±%
Conservative	Christopher Horne	2,223	64.7%	
Conservative	David Ashby	2,216		
Conservative	Delphine Joseph	2,209		
Labour	Frank Banfield	1,235	35.3%	
Labour	Elizabeth Sears	1,197		
Labour	J Evans	1,190		
Turnout			44.8%	
Conservative gain from Labour		Swing		
Conservative gain from Labour		Swing		
Conservative gain from Labour		Swing		

=== Gibbs Green ===
Gibbs Green (3)
Party	Candidate	Votes	%	±%
Conservative	Margot James	1,769	69.9%	
Conservative	Cyril Arnold	1,760		
Conservative	Ben Patterson	1,760		
Labour	Collinson G.A.	780	30.1%	
Labour	Moodie E. Mrs	762		
Labour	Perlin p. Mrs	735		
Turnout			38.3%	
Conservative gain from Labour		Swing		
Conservative gain from Labour		Swing		
Conservative gain from Labour		Swing		

=== Grove ===
Grove (3)
Party	Candidate	Votes	%	±%
Conservative	Christopher Gibbons	1,433	58.4%	
Conservative	George Boyce	1,422		
Conservative	Stuart Godwin	1,420		
Labour	Gosling E. R	1,026	41.6%	
Labour	Keppel F. E.	1,012		
Labour	Morris T.	1,010		
Turnout			34.4%	
Conservative gain from Labour		Swing		
Conservative gain from Labour		Swing		
Conservative gain from Labour		Swing		

=== Halford ===
Halford (3)
Party	Candidate	Votes	%	±%
Conservative	Griffin W. E	1,197	54.9%	
Conservative	Jarvis M, M. Mrs	1,163		
Conservative	Commander Nigel Parkinson	1,154		
Labour	Dyer H. E.	942	43.2%	
Labour	Beckett J. C.	916		
Labour	Lashley R. T.	907		
Communist	Robson P. T.	117	1.8%	
Turnout			38.0%	
Conservative gain from Labour		Swing		
Conservative gain from Labour		Swing		
Conservative gain from Labour		Swing		

=== Margravine ===
Margravine (3)
Party	Candidate	Votes	%	±%
Labour	Jack Ireland	1,099	50.6%	
Labour	Eric Hill	1,087		
Conservative	Roger Holroyd	1,067	49.4%	
Conservative	Wearmouth W. H.	1,041		
Labour	Stanley L. W.	1,040		
Conservative	Emanuel I. M. Miss	1,039		
Turnout			37.5%	
Labour hold		Swing		
Labour hold		Swing		
Conservative gain from Labour		Swing		

=== Parsons Green ===
Parsons Green (3)
Party	Candidate	Votes	%	±%
Conservative	John Akerman	1,865	63.7%	
Conservative	Patrick Ground	1,858		
Conservative	Ann Paltridge	1,846		
Labour	Duff H.D.	1,028	34.7%	
Labour	King D. T.	1,012		
Labour	Little B. Mrs	995		
Communist	Birch C.B.	145	1.7%	
Turnout			43.0%	
Conservative gain from Labour		Swing		
Conservative gain from Labour		Swing		
Conservative gain from Labour		Swing		

=== St Stephen's ===
St Stephen's (3)
Party	Candidate	Votes	%	±%
Conservative	Nick Bryce-Smith	970	59.5%	
Conservative	John Duff	942		
Conservative	Gabrielle Falkiner	931		
Labour	Jones L.S.	653	40.5%	
Labour	Brooker D, P,	646		
Labour	Hunt E.R.	634		
Turnout			34.3%	
Conservative gain from Labour		Swing		
Conservative gain from Labour		Swing		
Conservative gain from Labour		Swing		

=== Sandford ===
Sandford (3)
Party	Candidate	Votes	%	±%
Conservative	Ernie Ibbott	1,282	50.8%	
Conservative	Terence Moody	1,238		
Conservative	Sheira Trehearne	1,224		
Labour	Browning J. M.	1,148	45.9%	
Labour	Cooper P. M. Miss	1,127		
Labour	Barton P.J.	1,109		
Communist	Boulton V. I.	238	3.2%	
Turnout			38.0%	
Conservative gain from Labour		Swing		
Conservative gain from Labour		Swing		
Conservative gain from Labour		Swing		

=== Sherbrooke ===
Sherbrooke (2)
Party	Candidate	Votes	%	±%
Conservative	Jennifer Jane Godwin-Austen	830	49.5%	
Labour	Matthews S. A.	816	49.2%	
Labour	Hall M.A.	810		
Conservative	Burland W. J.	807		
Communist	Ritchie T.A. Mrs	42	1.3%	
Turnout			38.6%	
Conservative gain from Labour		Swing		
Labour hold		Swing		

=== Starch Green ===
Starch Green (3)
Party	Candidate	Votes	%	±%
Conservative	William Smith	1,849	68.7%	
Conservative	Perry P.C	1,841		
Conservative	Myra Sexton	1,832		
Labour	Johnson R. M. Mrs	850	31.3%	
Labour	Bull J.C.	834		
Labour	Coventry W. A.	834		
Turnout			44.4%	
Conservative gain from Labour		Swing		
Conservative gain from Labour		Swing		
Conservative hold		Swing		

=== Sulivan ===
Sulivan (3)
Party	Candidate	Votes	%	±%
Conservative	Christine Wagner	1,681	56.0%	
Conservative	Caroline Ground	1,664		
Conservative	Simon De Voghelaere	1,650		
Labour	Liardet C. J. Mrs	1,334	44.0%	
Labour	Powell A. F.	1,316		
Labour	Wheeler T.	1,271		
Turnout			43.2%	
Conservative gain from Labour		Swing		
Conservative gain from Labour		Swing		
Conservative gain from Labour		Swing		

=== Town ===
Town (3)
Party	Candidate	Votes	%	±%
Conservative	Paul Dwyer	1,735	61.5%	
Conservative	Peter Lilley	1,696		
Conservative	Peter Fane	1,688		
Labour	Gray I.	1,107	38.5%	
Labour	Cox T.M.	1,085		
Labour	Champion T. H.	1,019		
Turnout			46.5%	
Conservative gain from Labour		Swing		
Conservative gain from Labour		Swing		
Conservative gain from Labour		Swing		

=== White City ===
White City (3)
Party	Candidate	Votes	%	±%
Labour	Powell B. T.	850	46.3%	
Labour	Dr David Murrey	821		
Labour	Randolph Beresford	805		
Conservative	Sands C. T.	610	34.1%	
Conservative	Puckle A. C.	607		
Conservative	Lockey R.S.	604		
Liberal	Clark R.J.	330	18.1%	
Liberal	Coombes V. E. Mrs	323		
Liberal	Playle J.	316		
Communist	Gould J.	81	1.5%	
Turnout			30.5%	
Labour hold		Swing		
Labour hold		Swing		
Labour hold		Swing		

=== Wormholt ===
Wormholt (3)
Party	Candidate	Votes	%	±%
Conservative	Dr Jack Rose	1,141	53.9%	
Conservative	Derek Carter	1,126		
Conservative	Arthur Simpson	1,060		
Labour	Ingram A.A.	973	46.1%	
Labour	Breeze A. G.	943		
Labour	Martin A. J.	933		
Turnout			38.0%	
Conservative gain from Labour		Swing		
Conservative gain from Labour		Swing		
Conservative gain from Labour		Swing		
