= 2014 Watford Borough Council election =

2014 UK local government election

- 22 May 2014

13 out of 36 seats to Watford Borough Council (Note: 13 seats were contested rather than the usual 12 due to a by-election in Callowland.) 19 seats needed for a majority

	First party	Second party	Third party
Leader	Iain Sharpe	Nigel Bell	Ian Brandon
Party	Liberal Democrats	Labour	Green
Leader's seat	Oxhey	Holywell	Callowland
Last election	23 seats, 41.3%	8 seats, 28.6%	3 seats, 10.2%
Seats before	23	8	3
Seats won	7	5	0
Seats after	23	11	1
Seat change	Steady	▲3	▼2
Popular vote	8,863	6,922	950
Percentage	34.2%	26.7%	3.7%
Swing	▼7.1 pp	▼1.9 pp	▼6.5 pp
- 2014 local election results in Watford
Mayor before election
Dorothy Thornhill
Liberal Democrats
Elected Mayor
Dorothy Thornhill
Liberal Democrats

The 2014 Watford Borough Council election took place on 22 May 2014 to elect members to Watford Borough Council in England. This was on the same day as other local elections.

== Results by ward ==
=== Callowland ===
Callowland (2 seats) (Note: Two seats were contested in Callowland due to the resignation of incumbent councillor Steve Rackett.)
Party	Candidate	Votes	%	±%
Labour	Sohail Bashir	653		
Labour	Seamus Williams	511		
Liberal Democrats	Dennis Wharton	459		
Green	Su Murray	424		
Liberal Democrats	Zaheer Ahmed	411		
Green	John Dowdle	364		
UKIP	Ian Green	288		
Conservative	Sally Punter	183		
Conservative	Len Kerswill	178		
Turnout				
Labour gain from Green				
Labour gain from Green				

=== Central ===
Central
Party	Candidate	Votes	%	±%
Liberal Democrats	Stephen Bolton	813		
Labour	Avril Haley	698		
Conservative	Joanne Norwood	252		
UKIP	Renie Price	243		
TUSC	Mark O'Connor	50		
Majority		115		
Turnout			30.9	
Liberal Democrats hold				

=== Holywell ===
Holywell
Party	Candidate	Votes	%	±%
Labour	Jackie Connal	1,164		
UKIP	Caroline Penn	346		
Liberal Democrats	Simonie Jeffree	231		
Conservative	Anne Sander	221		
TUSC	Sajith Attepuram	33		
Majority		818		
Turnout			30.8	
Labour hold				

=== Leggatts ===
Leggatts
Party	Candidate	Votes	%	±%
Labour	Bilqees Mauthoor	855		
Liberal Democrats	Bobby Amin	433		
UKIP	Logan Browne	420		
Conservative	Neil Punter	289		
Green	Alison Wiesner	151		
TUSC	Thineshkumar Balasingam	35		
Majority		422		
Turnout			36.8	
Labour gain from Conservative				

=== Meriden ===
Meriden
Party	Candidate	Votes	%	±%
Liberal Democrats	Kareen Hastrick	826		
UKIP	Nicholas Lincoln	532		
Labour	Favour Ewudo	452		
Conservative	Mark Whitman	288		
Majority		294		
Turnout			34.5	
Liberal Democrats hold				

=== Nascot ===
Nascot
Party	Candidate	Votes	%	±%
Liberal Democrats	Mark Watkin	1,260		
Conservative	Camilla Khawaja	647		
UKIP	David Penn	315		
Labour	Daniel Kerry	272		
Green	Sally Ivins	164		
Majority		613		
Turnout			40.5	
Liberal Democrats hold				

=== Oxhey ===
Oxhey
Party	Candidate	Votes	%	±%
Liberal Democrats	Iain Sharpe	1,236		
Labour	Sue Sleeman	289		
Conservative	Penelope Mortimer	276		
UKIP	Joyce Burrows	268		
TUSC	Sharon Belsham-Wray	32		
Majority		947		
Turnout			39.8	
Liberal Democrats hold				

=== Park ===
Park
Party	Candidate	Votes	%	±%
Conservative	Binita Mehta	939		
Liberal Democrats	Anne Rindl	906		
Independent	Malcolm Meerabux	518		
UKIP	Peter Blogg	258		
Labour	David Connal	247		
Green	Dorothy Nixon	117		
Majority		33		
Turnout			49.6	
Conservative hold				

=== Stanborough ===
Stanborough
Party	Candidate	Votes	%	±%
Liberal Democrats	Keith Crout	898		
UKIP	Penny Barefoot	400		
Conservative	Christopher Hawes	305		
Labour	Benson Obasogie	249		
TUSC	John McShane	33		
Majority		498		
Turnout			34.3	
Liberal Democrats hold				

=== Tudor ===
Tudor
Party	Candidate	Votes	%	±%
Liberal Democrats	Stephen Johnson	730		
UKIP	Dan Channing	397		
Labour	Diana Ivory	348		
Conservative	Amanda Norwood	348		
Green	Martin Wiesner	94		
Majority		333		
Turnout			40.1	
Liberal Democrats hold				

=== Vicarage ===
Vicarage
Party	Candidate	Votes	%	±%
Labour	Jagtar Dhindsa	1,403		
Liberal Democrats	Joe Fahmy	346		
UKIP	Robert Carter	234		
Conservative	Dave Ealey	207		
TUSC	James O'Connor	56		
Majority		1,057		
Turnout			38.3	
Labour hold				

=== Woodside ===
Woodside
Party	Candidate	Votes	%	±%
Liberal Democrats	Karen Collett	725		
UKIP	Andrew Cox	441		
Conservative	Tony Rogers	348		
Labour	Steven Palmer	292		
Majority		284		
Turnout			32.6	
Liberal Democrats hold				

== Mayoral election ==
2014 Watford mayoral election
- 22 May 2014
- Turnout: 36.95%
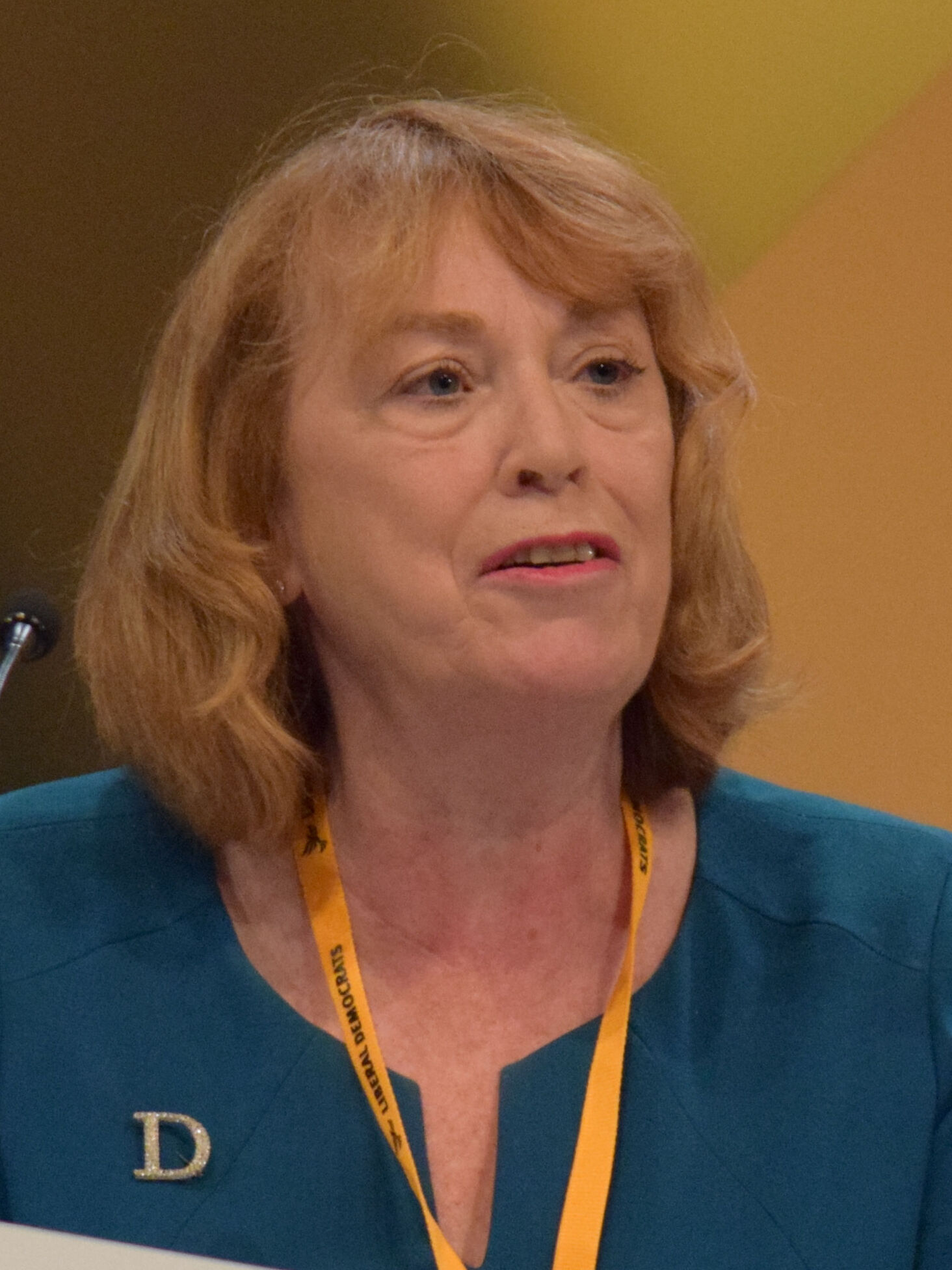
	First party	Second party
Candidate	Dorothy Thornhill	Jagtar Dhindsa
Party	Liberal Democrats	Labour
First round	11,741 (45.9%)	6,577 (25.7%)
Final round	14,193 (65.4%)	7,504 (34.6%)
	Third party	Fourth party
Candidate	Phil Cox	Linda Topping
Party	UKIP	Conservative
First round	3,789 (14.8%)	3,470 (13.6%)
Final round	Eliminated	Eliminated
Mayor before election
Dorothy Thornhill
Liberal Democrat
Elected Mayor
Dorothy Thornhill
Liberal Democrat

In September 2013, incumbent mayor Dorothy Thornhill of the Liberal Democrats announced that she would be running for her fourth term in 2014 after serving as mayor since 2002. That same month, the Labour Party announced Vicarage councillor Jagtar Dhindsa as their candidate. In January 2014, the UK Independence Party (UKIP) announced businessman Phil Cox as their candidate. In April 2014, the Conservative Party selected Linda Topping as their mayoral candidate.

2014 Watford mayoral election
Party	Candidate	1st round		2nd round			1st round votesTransfer votes, 2nd round
Party	Candidate	Total	Of round	Transfers	Total	Of round	1st round votesTransfer votes, 2nd round
Liberal Democrats	Dorothy Thornhill	11,741	45.9%	2,452	14,193	65.4%	
Labour	Jagtar Dhindsa	6,577	25.7%	927	7,504	34.6%	
UKIP	Phil Cox	3,789	14.8%				
Conservative	Linda Topping	3,470	13.6%				
