= Waverley Borough Council elections =

Local government elections in Surrey, England

Waverley Borough Council is the local authority for the Borough of Waverley, Surrey. The council was elected every four years. The council is due to be abolished on 1 April 2027 following structural changes to local government in Surrey.

== Council elections ==
Composition of the council
Year	Conservative	Liberal Democrats (Note: Includes totals for the predecessors of the Liberal Democrats, the Liberal Party and SDP (both of which participated in the Alliance).)	Labour	Green (Note: Includes totals for the predecessors of the Green Party of England and Wales, the Ecology Party and Green Party UK.)	Farnham Residents	Independents & Others	Council control after election
Local government reorganisation; council established (61 seats)
1973	27	25	2	–	–	7	No overall control
1976	42	6	3	0	–	10	Conservative
1979	47	6	2	0	–	6	Conservative
New ward boundares (57 seats)
1983	46	4	2	0	–	5	Conservative
1987	42	13	0	0	–	2	Conservative
1991	28	27	2	0	–	0	No overall control
1995	17	37	2	0	–	1	Liberal Democrats
1999	31	24	2	0	–	0	Conservative
New ward boundares (57 seats)
2003	27	30	0	0	–	0	Liberal Democrats
2007	51	3	0	0	–	3	Conservative
2011	56	0	0	0	–	1	Conservative
2015	53	0	0	0	3	1	Conservative
2019	23	14	2	2	15	1	No overall control
New ward boundaries (50 seats)
2023	10	22	2	1	13	2	No overall control

== Results maps ==
2003 results map

2007 results map

2011 results map

2015 results map

2019 results map

2023 results map

== By-election results ==
=== 1995-1999 ===
Farnham Waverley By-Election 21 November 1996
Party	Candidate	Votes	%	±%
Conservative		685	50.8	
Liberal Democrats		550	40.8	
Labour		113	8.4	
Majority		135	10.0	
Turnout		1,348		
Conservative gain from Liberal Democrats		Swing		

Milford By-Election 11 December 1997
Party	Candidate	Votes	%	±%
Conservative		587	53.9	+25.3
Liberal Democrats		460	42.2	−29.2
Labour		42	3.9	+3.9
Majority		127	11.7	
Turnout		1,089	36.1	
Conservative gain from Liberal Democrats		Swing		

=== 1999-2003 ===
Godalming North West By-Election 30 September 1999
Party	Candidate	Votes	%	±%
Liberal Democrats		670	57.9	+12.0
Conservative		428	37.0	−4.3
Labour		60	5.2	−7.7
Majority		242	20.9	
Turnout		1,158	28.6	
Liberal Democrats hold		Swing		

Farnham Bourne By-Election 7 June 2001
Party	Candidate	Votes	%	±%
Conservative		1,660	50.0	−12.4
Liberal Democrats		1,471	44.3	+6.6
Labour		191	5.8	+5.8
Majority		189	5.7	
Turnout		3,322		
Conservative hold		Swing		

Farnham Weybourne and Badshot Lea By-Election 8 December 2001
Party	Candidate	Votes	%	±%
Liberal Democrats		507	49.3	+2.2
Conservative		478	46.5	+26.4
Labour		43	4.2	−5.0
Majority		29	2.8	
Turnout		1,028	29.3	
Liberal Democrats hold		Swing		

=== 2003-2007 ===
Farnham Firgrove By-Election 22 April 2004
Party	Candidate	Votes	%	±%
Conservative	Bob Frost	693	47.0	+14.8
Liberal Democrats	Joan Clark	668	45.3	−12.6
UKIP	Alastair Murdoch	80	5.4	−4.5
Labour	Andrew Jones	34	2.3	+2.3
Majority		25	1.7	
Turnout		1,475	46.0	
Conservative gain from Liberal Democrats		Swing		

Cranleigh East By-Election 22 July 2004
Party	Candidate	Votes	%	±%
Liberal Democrats	Ken Reed	936	48.1	+0.7
Conservative		855	43.9	+1.8
Labour		156	8.0	−2.5
Majority		81	4.2	
Turnout		1,947	39.6	
Liberal Democrats gain from Conservative		Swing		

Haslemere Critchmere and Shottermill By-Election 5 May 2005
Party	Candidate	Votes	%	±%
Liberal Democrats		1,421	50.6	
Conservative		1,386	49.4	
Majority		35	1.2	
Turnout		2,807		
Liberal Democrats hold		Swing		

Godalming Holloway By-Election 15 September 2005
Party	Candidate	Votes	%	±%
Conservative	Peter Martin	833	58.9	+7.0
Liberal Democrats	Simon Cordon	555	39.2	−8.9
Labour		27	1.9	+1.9
Majority		278	19.7	
Turnout		1,415	44.2	
Conservative hold		Swing		

Ewhurst By-Election 23 March 2006
Party	Candidate	Votes	%	±%
Independent	Diane James	372	38.4	+38.4
Conservative	Richard Cleaves	360	37.2	−16.1
Liberal Democrats	Ruth Reed	230	23.8	−22.9
Labour	Richard Chaundy	6	0.6	+0.6
Majority		12	1.2	
Turnout		968	58.6	
Independent gain from Conservative		Swing		

Alfold, Cranleigh Rural and Ellens Green By-Election 23 April 2009
Party	Candidate	Votes	%	±%
Conservative		429	64.3	−6.0
Liberal Democrats	Richard Cole	238	35.7	+13.5
Majority		191	28.6	
Turnout		667		
Conservative hold		Swing		

=== 2011-2015 ===
Farnham Wrecclesham and Rowledge By-Election 2 May 2013
Party	Candidate	Votes	%	±%
Conservative	Wyatt Ramsdale	545	46.1	−15.0
Independent	David Beaman	294	24.9	+24.9
UKIP	Richard Dancy	252	21.3	+21.3
Labour	Andrew Jones	91	7.7	−8.0
Majority		251	21.2	
Turnout		1,182		
Conservative hold		Swing		

=== 2015-2019 ===
Farnham Castle By-Election 18 August 2016
Party	Candidate	Votes	%	±%
Farnham Residents	Jerry Hyman	386	40.6	+6.0
Liberal Democrats	Stewart Edge	292	30.7	+6.3
Conservative	Nicholas Le Gal	229	24.1	−2.3
UKIP	George Hesse	43	4.5	N/A
Majority		94	9.9	
Turnout		953	30.17	
Farnham Residents gain from Conservative		Swing		

Farnham Shortheath and Boundstone By-Election 18 August 2016
Party	Candidate	Votes	%	±%
Farnham Residents	John Ward	356	47.6	+7.0
Conservative	Donal O'Neill	233	31.1	−14.0
Liberal Democrats	Sylvia Jacobs	90	12.0	N/A
Independent	Andrew Jones	43	3.4	N/A
UKIP	Jim Burroughs	26	3.5	N/A
Majority		123	16.5	
Turnout		753	23.01	
Farnham Residents gain from Conservative		Swing		

Cranleigh West By-Election 21 December 2016
Party	Candidate	Votes	%	±%
Conservative	Liz Townsend	377	58.7	+2.9
Liberal Democrats	Richard Cole	187	29.1	−1.0
UKIP	Rosaleen Egan	78	12.1	+12.1
Majority		190	29.6	
Turnout		642		
Conservative hold		Swing		

Godalming Central and Ockford By-Election 13 December 2017
Party	Candidate	Votes	%	±%
Liberal Democrats	Paul Follows	266	37.8	+37.8
Conservative	Stella Andersen-Payne	246	35.0	−6.5
Labour	Richard Ashworth	151	21.5	−4.6
Green	Susan Ryland	40	5.7	+5.7
Majority		20	2.8	
Turnout		703		
Liberal Democrats gain from Conservative		Swing		

Farnham Castle By-Election 24 May 2018
Party	Candidate	Votes	%	±%
Farnham Residents	David Beaman	354	37.9	+3.3
Liberal Democrats	Jo Aylwin	338	36.1	+11.7
Conservative	Rashida Nasir	175	18.7	−7.7
Labour	Rebecca Kaye	42	4.5	−10.0
Independent	Mark Westcott	26	2.8	+2.8
Majority		16	1.7	
Turnout		935		
Farnham Residents hold		Swing		

=== 2019-2023 ===
Milford By-Election 13 February 2020
Party	Candidate	Votes	%	±%
Independent	Maxine Gale	452	50.6	+50.6
Conservative	Carmel Oates	328	36.7	+17.3
Independent	Rosaleen Egan	113	12.7	+12.7
Majority		124	13.9	
Turnout		893		
Independent hold		Swing		

Cranleigh East By-Election 7 October 2021
Party	Candidate	Votes	%	±%
Liberal Democrats	Philip Townsend	903	56.8	+12.0
Conservative	Rosemary Burbridge	686	43.2	+4.2
Majority		217	13.7	
Turnout		1,589		
Liberal Democrats hold		Swing		

Frensham, Dockenfield and Tilford By-Election 12 May 2022
Party	Candidate	Votes	%	±%
Independent	David Munro	492	42.1	+42.1
Green	Susan Ryland	354	30.3	−3.0
Conservative	Nabeel Nasir	323	27.6	−22.4
Majority		138	11.8	
Turnout		1,169		
Independent gain from Conservative		Swing		

Hindhead By-Election 23 June 2022
Party	Candidate	Votes	%	±%
Liberal Democrats	Julian Spence	537	54.6	+7.9
Conservative	Ged Hall	446	45.4	−1.1
Majority		91	9.3	
Turnout		983		
Liberal Democrats gain from Conservative		Swing		

Chiddingfold and Dunsfold By-Election 1 December 2022
Party	Candidate	Votes	%	±%
Liberal Democrats	Dave Busby	652	66.6	+43.5
Conservative	Ian Mitchell	297	30.3	−11.2
Labour	Rebecca Aitken	30	3.1	−5.0
Majority		355	36.3	
Turnout		979		
Liberal Democrats gain from Conservative		Swing		

=== 2023-2027 ===
Farnham Castle By-Election 18 April 2024
Party	Candidate	Votes	%	±%
Farnham Residents	Alan Earwaker	307	32.5	−17.6
Liberal Democrats	Theresa Meredith-Hardy	279	29.6	+29.6
Labour	John Gaskell	217	23.0	−11.7
Conservative	Aly Fitch	141	14.9	−0.2
Majority		28	2.9	N/A
Turnout		944	25.0	−4.8
Farnham Residents hold		Swing	N/A	

Witley and Milford By-Election 2 May 2024
Party	Candidate	Votes	%	±%
Liberal Democrats	Laura Cavaliere	1,152	44.7	+20.5
Conservative	Gary Hudson	902	35.0	+11.0
Independent	Tony Sollars	526	20.4	+20.4
Majority		250	9.9	
Turnout		2,580		
Liberal Democrats hold		Swing		

Godalming Binscombe and Charterhouse by-election 24 September 2024
Party	Candidate	Votes	%	±%
Conservative	Daniel Husseini	725	40.6	+19.7
Liberal Democrats	James Barratt	714	40.0	+10.7
Green	David Faraday	195	10.9	−16.3
Labour	Ben Knight	151	8.5	−14.1
Majority		11	0.6	
Turnout		1,785		
Conservative gain from Labour		Swing		

Haslemere West by-election 7 July 2026
Party	Candidate	Votes	%	±%
Liberal Democrats	Oli Leach	551	58.6	−5.7
Green	Thomas Shrive	164	17.4	+17.4
Conservative	Toby Byfield	141	15.0	−7.0
Reform	Barb Witt	84	8.9	+8.9
Majority		387	41.2	
Turnout		940		
Liberal Democrats hold		Swing		
