= Runnymede Borough Council =

Non-metropolitan district council in Surrey, England

Type
- Type: Non-metropolitan district

History
- Founded: 1 April 1974

Leadership
- Mayor: Steve Ringham, Green since 20 May 2026
- Co-leaders: Robert King (Lab); Don Whyte (Lib Dem); Linda Gillham (RIRG) since 15 May 2024
- Chief Executive: Andrew Pritchard since 1 August 2023

Structure
- Seats: 41 councillors
- Political groups: Administration (21): Labour (8); Liberal Democrats (7); RIRG (5); Independent (1); Other parties (19): Conservative (12); Reform (3); Green (2); Independent (2); Casual Vacancy (1): Vacant (1)
- Length of term: 4 years
- Salary: No salary, but an annual taxable basic allowance of £5,778

Elections
- First election: 7 June 1973
- Last election: 2 May 2024

Meeting place
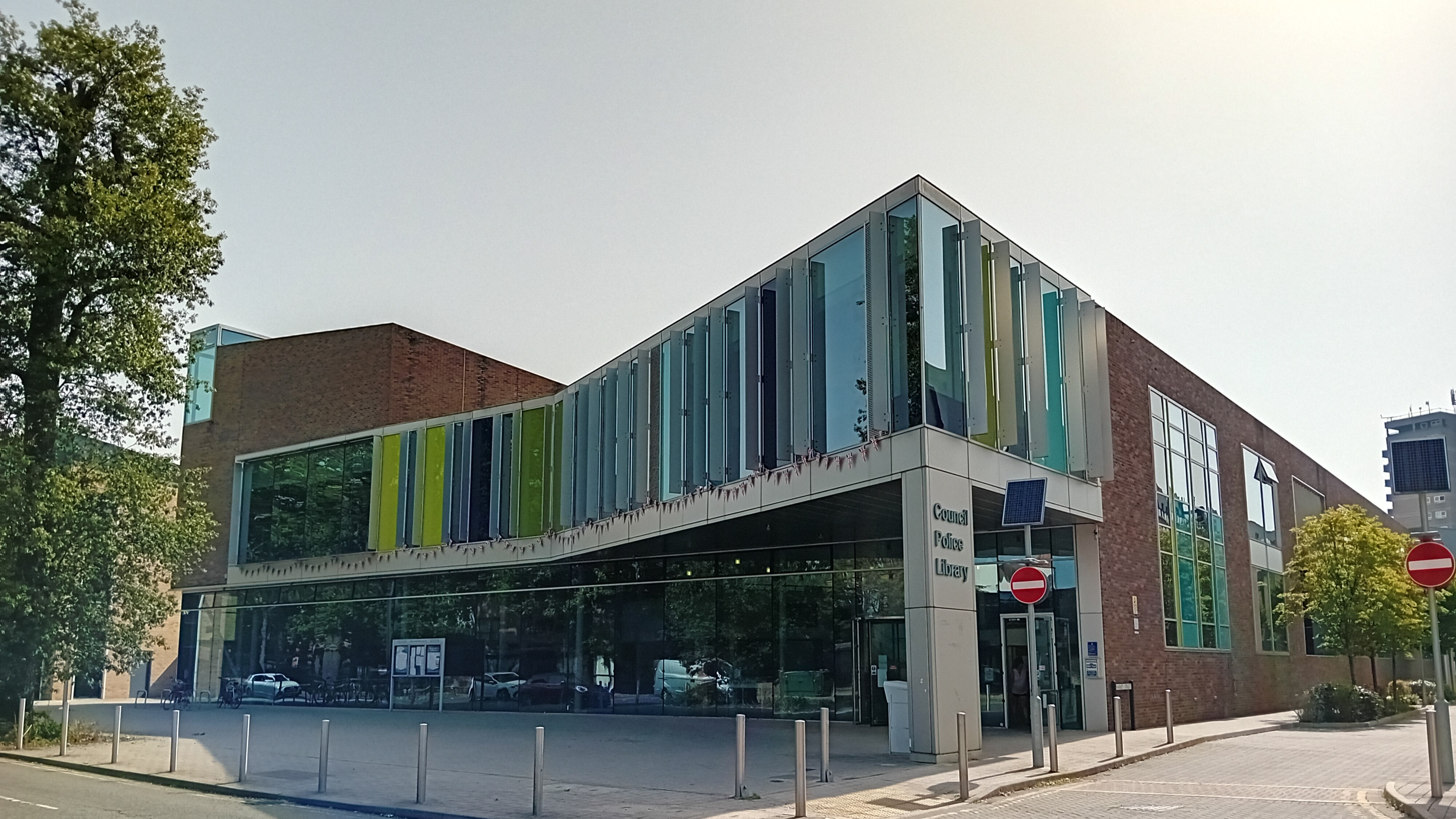
- Runnymede Civic Centre, Station Road, Addlestone, KT15 2AH

Website
- www.runnymede.gov.uk

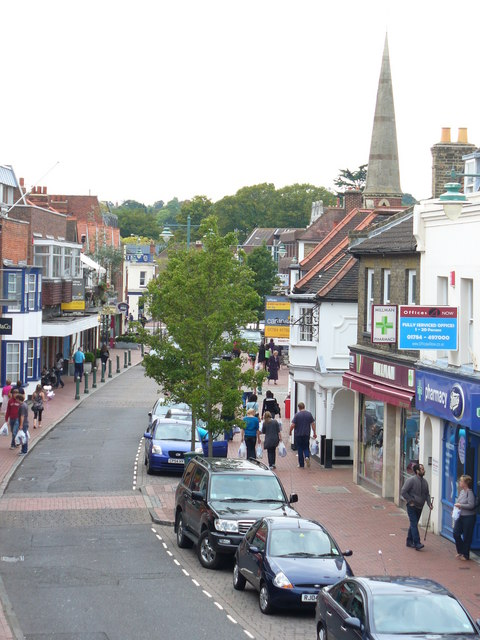
High Street in Egham

Runnymede Borough Council is the local authority for the Borough of Runnymede, a non-metropolitan district in Surrey, England. County-level services are provided by Surrey County Council. There are no civil parishes in the borough, which is an unparished area. The council has been under no overall control since 2023, being run since 2024 by a coalition of Labour, Liberal Democrat, Residents Group, and Independent councillors, along with Green councillors until October 2026.

Runnymede Borough Council, along with all Surrey district councils and Surrey County Council will be abolished in 2027 as part of ongoing local government restructuring, with the area of Runnymedge to become part of West Surrey, administered by West Surrey Council.

== Political control ==
The council has been under no overall control since 2023. Following the 2024 election an Alliance of Labour, Liberal Democrats, Greens and independent councillors formed to run the council.

The first elections to the council were held in 1973, initially operating as a shadow authority alongside the outgoing authorities until the new arrangements came into effect on 1 April 1974. Political control of the council since 1974 has been as follows:

Party in control	Years
Conservative	1974–1996
No overall control	1996–1998
Conservative	1998–2023
No overall control	2023–present

== Leadership ==
The role of mayor is largely ceremonial in Runnymede. Political leadership is instead provided by the leader or co-leaders of the council. The leaders (or co-leaders) since 1984 have been:

Councillor	Party	From	To	Notes
Denis Clarke	Conservative	1984	1986	
Michael Wheaton	Conservative	1986	1991	
Howard Langley	Conservative	1991	14 May 1997	
Chris Norman	Conservative	14 May 1997	2000	
Geoffrey Woodger	Conservative	2000	15 May 2003	
Roger Habgood	Conservative	15 May 2003	May 2005	
Geoffrey Woodger	Conservative	May 2005	May 2006	
John Furey	Conservative	2006	2011	
Patrick Roberts	Conservative	2011	May 2016	
Peter Waddell	Conservative	18 May 2016	May 2017	
Nick Prescot	Conservative	17 May 2017	May 2022	
Tom Gracey	Conservative	18 May 2022	May 2024	
Steve Ringham	Green	15 May 2024	20 May 2026	Co-leaders
Robert King	Labour	15 May 2024		Co-leaders
Don Whyte	Liberal Democrats	15 May 2024		Co-leaders
Linda Gillham	RIRG	15 May 2024		Co-leaders

== Composition ==
Following the 2024 election, and subsequent changes of allegiance, the composition of the council is:

Party	Seats
Conservative	12
Labour	8
Liberal Democrats	7
Runnymede Independent Residents Group	5
Independent	3
Reform	3
Green	2
Total	41

Of the independent councillors, two (both representing Ottershaw ward) form the "Independent Group", which informally supported the Conservative minority administration between 2023 and 2024. The remaining independent, representing Englefield Green East forms part of the majority administration group.

== Elections ==
Since the last boundary changes in 2019 the council has comprised 41 councillors representing 14 wards with each ward electing three councillors except Englefield Green East which elects two. Elections were held three years out of every four, with roughly a third of the council elected each time for a four-year term of office. Surrey County Council elections were held in the fourth year of the cycle when there were no borough council elections.

Further borough council elections were cancelled in 2026, and an election for the new West Surrey Council was held instead. West Surrey Council will formally come into being and take over local government functions in the area on 1 April 2027, at which point Runnymede Borough Council and the borough of Runnymede will be abolished.

== Premises ==
The council is based at Runnymede Civic Centre on Station Road in Addlestone. The new building cost a reported £12.6m and opened in May 2008. The council's former offices were on the adjoining site and were subsequently demolished to make way for a retail development.
