= 2011 Waverley Borough Council election =

Local election in Surrey, UK

Results of the 2011 Waverley Borough Council election

Elections to Waverley Borough Council were held on 5 May 2011, alongside other local elections across the United Kingdom. All 57 seats on the council were up for election. Following the election the council remained under Conservative control.

== Results summary ==
2011 Waverley Borough Council election
Party	Seats	Change
Conservative Party	56	▲6
Liberal Democrats	0	▼3
Other	1	▼3

== See also ==
- Waverley Borough Council elections
