= 2019 Waverley Borough Council election =

2019 UK local government election

- 2 May 2019

All 57 seats to Waverley Borough Council 29 seats needed for a majority
- Turnout: 37.8%

	First party	Second party	Third party
Party	Conservative	Residents	Liberal Democrats
Last election	53 seats, 52.0%	3 seats, 5.2%	0 seats, 15.0%
Seats before	53	3	0
Seats won	23	15	14
Seat change	▼30	▲12	▲14
Popular vote	25,749	12,734	17,150
Percentage	39.7%	19.6%	26.5%
Swing	▼12.3%	▲14.4%	▲11.5%
	Fourth party	Fifth party	Sixth party
Party	Labour	Green	Independent
Last election	0 seats, 12.5%	0 seats, 3.1%	1 seat, 7.1%
Seats before	0	0	1
Seats won	2	2	1
Seat change	▲2	▲2	Steady
Popular vote	4,362	3,205	1,230
Percentage	6.7%	4.9%	1.9%
Swing	▼5.8%	▲1.8%	▼5.2%
- Winner of each seat at the 2019 Waverley Borough Council election
Council control before election
Conservative
Council control after election
John Ward
No overall control

The 2019 Waverley Borough Council election took place on 2 May 2019 to elect members of Waverley Borough Council in England as one of the 2019 local elections.

== Results ==
In the 2015 elections the Conservatives won 53 seats, the Farnham Residents Party won 3 and an independent won the remaining seat. However, before the 2019 election the composition of the council had changed through by-elections to 50 Conservatives, 6 Farnham Residents and 1 Liberal Democrat.

2019 Waverley Borough Council election
Party	Candidates	Seats	Gains	Losses	Net gain/loss	Seats %	Votes %	Votes	+/−
Conservative	57	23	0	30	▼30	40.4	39.7	25,749	–12.3
Residents	17	15	12	0	▲12	26.3	19.6	12,734	+14.4
Liberal Democrats	27	14	14	0	▲14	24.6	26.5	17,150	+11.5
Labour	20	2	2	0	▲2	3.5	6.7	4,362	–5.8
Green	6	2	2	0	▲2	3.5	4.9	3,205	+1.8
Independent	2	1	0	0	Steady	1.8	1.9	1,230	–5.2

Following the election, a Farnham Residents Association - Liberal Democrat - Labour - Green coalition was formed, replacing the previous Conservative administration. Cllr John Ward (Farnham Residents Association) was elected leader of the council on 21 May 2019, with Cllr Paul Follows (Liberal Democrat) elected as his deputy.

== Ward results ==
=== Alford, Cranleigh Rural and Ellens Green ===
Alford, Cranleigh Rural and Ellens Green (1 seat)
Party	Candidate	Votes	%	±%
Conservative	Kevin Deanus	Unopposed	N/A	−62.9
Turnout		N/A	N/A	
Registered electors		1,545		
Conservative hold		Swing		

=== Blackheath and Wonersh ===
Blackheath and Wonersh (1 seat)
Party	Candidate	Votes	%	±%
Conservative	Michael Goodridge	387	58.1	+58.1
Liberal Democrats	Robert Ellis	163	24.5	N/A
Green	Richard Goldsmith	90	13.5	N/A
Labour	Simon Hall	26	3.9	N/A
Turnout		666	45.2	+45.2
Registered electors		1,488		
Rejected ballots		7	1.0	
Conservative hold		Swing		

=== Bramley, Busbridge and Hascombe ===
Bramley, Busbridge and Hascombe (2 seats)
Party	Candidate	Votes	%	±%
Conservative	Richard Seaborne	774	62.5	−5.0
Green	Martin D'Arcy	590	47.7	N/A
Conservative	Stewart Stennett	538	43.5	−31.3
Turnout		1,238	34.9	
Registered electors		3,586		
Rejected ballots		14	1.1	
Conservative hold		Swing		
Green gain from Conservative		Swing		

=== Chiddingfold and Dunsfold ===
Chiddingfold and Dunsfold (2 seats)
Party	Candidate	Votes	%	±%
Conservative	John Gray	617	55.0	−3.6
Conservative	Anna James	606	54.0	−10.9
Green	Lou Whyte	406	36.2	N/A
Liberal Democrats	John Leston	344	30.7	N/A
Labour	Tony Johnson	121	10.8	−9.9
Turnout		1,122	37.3	
Registered electors		3,051		
Rejected ballots		15	1.3	
Conservative hold		Swing		
Conservative hold		Swing		

=== Cranleigh East ===
Cranleigh East (3 seats)
Party	Candidate	Votes	%	±%
Liberal Democrats	Richard Cole	779	46.5	+22.0
Liberal Democrats	Ruth Reed	702	41.9	+18.8
Conservative	Mary Foryszewski	678	40.4	−5.6
Liberal Democrats	Ken Reed	664	39.6	+14.5
Conservative	Angela Richardson	648	38.6	−6.0
Conservative	Andrew Blurton	610	36.4	−7.3
Labour	Mark West	280	16.7	+2.5
Turnout		1,677	33.3	
Registered electors		5,148		
Rejected ballots		39	2.3	
Liberal Democrats gain from Conservative		Swing		
Liberal Democrats gain from Conservative		Swing		
Conservative hold		Swing		

=== Cranleigh West ===
Cranleigh West (2 seats)
Party	Candidate	Votes	%	±%
Conservative	Liz Townsend	669	60.8	+9.5
Conservative	Patricia Ellis	560	50.9	−5.4
Liberal Democrats	Nigel Sanctuary	431	39.1	+8.7
Liberal Democrats	Fabian Cole	369	33.5	+10.6
Turnout		1,101	35.9	
Registered electors		3,131		
Rejected ballots		24	2.1	
Conservative hold		Swing		
Conservative hold		Swing		

=== Elstead and Thursley ===
Elstead and Thursley (2 seats)
Party	Candidate	Votes	%	±%
Conservative	Jenny Else	819	78.5	+11.4
Conservative	David Else	744	71.3	+13.4
Labour	Jessica Webster	272	26.1	N/A
Turnout		1,043	35.5	
Registered electors		3,052		
Rejected ballots		40	3.7	
Conservative hold		Swing		
Conservative hold		Swing		

=== Ewhurst ===
Ewhurst (1 seat)
Party	Candidate	Votes	%	±%
Conservative	Val Henry	461	76.3	+19.9
Labour	James Mitchell	143	23.7	N/A
Turnout		604	38.6	
Registered electors		1,621		
Rejected ballots		21	3.4	
Conservative hold		Swing		

=== Farnham Bourne ===
Farnham Bourne (2 seats)
Party	Candidate	Votes	%	±%
Residents	Roger Blishen	749	58.7	N/A
Conservative	Carole Cockburn	679	53.2	+53.2
Liberal Democrats	Cosmo Lupton	380	29.8	N/A
Conservative	Martin Lear	379	29.7	+29.7
Turnout		1,277	40.7	
Registered electors		3,144		
Rejected ballots		3	0.2	
Residents gain from Conservative		Swing		
Conservative hold		Swing		

=== Farnham Castle ===
Farnham Castle (2 seats)
Party	Candidate	Votes	%	±%
Residents	David Beaman	885	70.6	+22.6
Residents	George Hesse	813	64.8	N/A
Liberal Democrats	Peter Telford	290	23.1	−10.8
Conservative	Sarah Anson	193	15.4	−21.3
Conservative	Liz Wheatley	124	9.9	−19.6
Turnout		1,254	39.8	
Registered electors		3,172		
Rejected ballots		8	0.6	
Residents hold		Swing		
Residents gain from Conservative		Swing		

=== Farnham Firgrove ===
Farnham Firgrove (2 seats)
Party	Candidate	Votes	%	±%
Residents	Jerry Hyman	853	63.0	N/A
Residents	John Neale	767	56.6	N/A
Liberal Democrats	Adam Chambers	310	22.9	−6.5
Conservative	Simon Foale	272	20.1	−31.7
Conservative	Sam Pritchard	256	18.9	−19.5
Labour	Anthony Watts	87	6.4	−11.1
Turnout		1,355	42.0	
Registered electors		3,244		
Rejected ballots		7	0.5	
Residents gain from Conservative		Swing		
Residents gain from Conservative		Swing		

=== Farnham Hale and Heath End ===
Farnham Hale and Heath End (2 seats)
Party	Candidate	Votes	%	±%
Residents	Sally Dickson	821	72.2	N/A
Residents	Michaela Gray	709	62.4	N/A
Conservative	Mike Hodge	266	23.4	−26.7
Conservative	Denise Le Gal	215	18.9	−20.3
Labour	Rebecca Kaye	128	11.3	−10.1
Turnout		1,137	34.5	
Registered electors		3,317		
Rejected ballots		6	0.5	
Residents gain from Conservative		Swing		
Residents gain from Conservative		Swing		

=== Farnham Moor Park ===
Farnham Moor Park (2 seats)
Party	Candidate	Votes	%	±%
Residents	Andy MacLeod*	992	74.9	+35.2
Residents	Michaela Martin	899	67.8	N/A
Liberal Democrats	Richard Soper	260	19.6	−5.6
Conservative	Pat Frost	246	18.6	−24.3
Conservative	Rashida Nasir	148	11.2	−25.0
Turnout		1,325	36.2	
Registered electors		3,675		
Rejected ballots		7	0.5	
Residents gain from Independent		Swing		
Residents gain from Conservative		Swing		

- Andy MacLeod was elected in 2015 as an independent.

=== Farnham Shortheath and Boundstone ===
Farnham Shortheath and Boundstone (2 seats)
Party	Candidate	Votes	%	±%
Residents	John Ward	814	71.0	+37.6
Residents	Kika Mirylees	790	68.9	+18.0
Conservative	Adrian Waller	225	19.6	−25.9
Conservative	Tom van den Broek	217	18.9	−15.5
Labour	Andrew Jones	118	10.3	−4.1
Turnout		1,146	35.4	
Registered electors		3,261		
Rejected ballots		10	0.9	
Residents gain from Conservative		Swing		
Residents hold		Swing		

=== Farnham Upper Hale ===
Farnham Upper Hale (2 seats)
Party	Candidate	Votes	%	±%
Residents	Penny Marriott	813	75.7	+27.0
Residents	Peter Marriott	690	64.2	+26.6
Labour	Howard Kaye	186	17.3	+2.3
Conservative	Owen Barry	173	16.1	−26.4
Conservative	Stephen Barr	121	11.3	−21.9
Turnout		1,074	33.8	
Registered electors		3,201		
Rejected ballots		7	0.6	
Residents hold		Swing		
Residents gain from Conservative		Swing		

=== Farnham Weybourne and Badshot Lea ===
Farnham Weybourne and Badshot Lea (2 seats)
Party	Candidate	Votes	%	±%
Liberal Democrats	Daniel Hunt	701	50.7	+17.0
Liberal Democrats	Mark Merryweather	604	43.6	N/A
Residents	Bob Blower	456	32.9	N/A
Residents	David Quick	388	28.0	N/A
Conservative	Chris Storey	209	15.1	−25.6
Conservative	Nabeel Nasir	161	11.6	−28.2
Labour	Joan Anniballi	65	4.7	−14.0
Turnout		1,384	41.1	
Registered electors		3,399		
Rejected ballots		12	0.9	
Liberal Democrats gain from Conservative		Swing		
Liberal Democrats gain from Conservative		Swing		

=== Farnham Wrecclesham and Rowledge ===
Farnham Wrecclesham and Rowledge (2 seats)
Party	Candidate	Votes	%	±%
Residents	Brian Edmonds	675	52.1	N/A
Residents	Peter Clark	620	47.8	N/A
Conservative	Robert Ramsdale	390	30.1	−20.0
Conservative	Lynley Griffiths	315	24.3	−31.6
Liberal Democrats	Rosamund Lupton	265	20.4	N/A
Labour	Tim Corry	119	9.2	−12.5
Turnout		1,296	38.8	
Registered electors		3,363		
Rejected ballots		9	0.7	
Residents gain from Conservative		Swing		
Residents gain from Conservative		Swing		

=== Frensham, Dockenfield and Tilford ===
Frensham, Dockenfield and Tilford (2 seats)
Party	Candidate	Votes	%	±%
Conservative	Brian Adams	683	60.7	+60.7
Conservative	Julia Potts	590	52.4	+52.4
Green	Susan Ryland	454	40.3	N/A
Labour	Natasha Fletcher	228	20.2	N/A
Turnout		1,126	37.5	
Registered electors		3,052		
Rejected ballots		20	1.7	
Conservative hold		Swing		
Conservative hold		Swing		

=== Godalming Binscombe ===
Godalming Binscombe (2 seats)
Party	Candidate	Votes	%	±%
Liberal Democrats	Paul Rivers	729	63.9	+28.3
Labour	Nick Palmer	467	40.9	+7.9
Conservative	Anne Gray	375	32.9	−10.8
Conservative	David Hunter	302	26.5	−22.2
Turnout		1,141	38.0	
Registered electors		3,062		
Rejected ballots		23	2.0	
Liberal Democrats gain from Conservative		Swing		
Labour gain from Conservative		Swing		

=== Godalming Central and Ockford ===
Godalming Central and Ockford (2 seats)
Party	Candidate	Votes	%	±%
Liberal Democrats	Paul Follows	1,073	74.1	N/A
Liberal Democrats	Anne-Marie Rosoman	878	60.6	N/A
Conservative	Kirsty Walden	292	20.2	−31.1
Conservative	Tristan Hopper	275	19.0	−25.5
Labour	Richard Ashworth	179	12.4	−19.9
Turnout		1,449	39.8	
Registered electors		3,666		
Rejected ballots		10	0.7	
Liberal Democrats gain from Conservative		Swing		
Liberal Democrats gain from Conservative		Swing		

=== Godalming Charterhouse ===
Godalming Charterhouse (2 seats)
Party	Candidate	Votes	%	±%
Green	Steve Williams	865	67.6	+34.1
Conservative	Steve Cosser	504	39.4	−20.1
Labour	Kate Cooney	446	34.8	+8.9
Conservative	Andrew Bolton	422	33.0	−17.4
Turnout		1,280	47.3	
Registered electors		2,731		
Rejected ballots		12	0.9	
Green gain from Conservative		Swing		
Conservative hold		Swing		

=== Godalming Farncombe and Catteshall ===
Godalming Farncombe and Catteshall (2 seats)
Party	Candidate	Votes	%	±%
Liberal Democrats	Penny Rivers	1,012	73.7	+46.1
Labour	George Wilson	484	35.3	+17.3
Conservative	Nicholas Williams	395	28.8	−11.1
Conservative	Ross Welland	317	23.1	−21.6
Turnout		1,373	38.3	
Registered electors		3,649		
Rejected ballots		23	1.6	
Liberal Democrats gain from Conservative		Swing		
Labour gain from Conservative		Swing		

=== Godalming Holloway ===
Godalming Holloway (2 seats)
Party	Candidate	Votes	%	±%
Liberal Democrats	Joan Heagin	1,034	61.6	N/A
Conservative	Peter Martin	737	43.9	−27.0
Conservative	Tom Martin	642	38.3	−26.6
Labour	Toby Westcott-White	465	27.7	−1.9
Turnout		1,678	50.8	
Registered electors		3,342		
Rejected ballots		20	1.2	
Liberal Democrats gain from Conservative		Swing		
Conservative hold		Swing		

=== Haslemere Critchmere and Shottermill ===
Haslemere Critchmere and Shottermill (3 seats)
Party	Candidate	Votes	%	±%
Liberal Democrats	Jacqueline Robini	1,034	57.1	+23.0
Liberal Democrats	Peter Nicholson	894	49.4	+24.2
Liberal Democrats	John Robini	887	49.0	+24.8
Conservative	James Edwards	619	34.2	−18.4
Conservative	Carole King	566	31.3	−16.5
Conservative	Phoebe Sullivan	472	26.1	−18.9
UKIP	Adam Wade	184	10.2	N/A
Turnout		1,811	41.6	
Registered electors		4,418		
Rejected ballots		26	1.4	
Liberal Democrats gain from Conservative		Swing		
Liberal Democrats gain from Conservative		Swing		
Liberal Democrats gain from Conservative		Swing		

=== Haslemere East and Grayswood ===
Haslemere East and Grayswood (3 seats)
Party	Candidate	Votes	%	±%
Conservative	Simon Dear	1,001	45.2	−1.6
Conservative	Stephen Mulliner	999	45.1	−7.8
Conservative	Robert Knowles	976	44.1	−6.5
Liberal Democrats	Terry Weldon	819	37.0	N/A
Green	Gary Lloyd	800	36.1	N/A
Liberal Democrats	Elizabeth Pamplin	796	35.9	+13.3
Labour	Adrian La Porta	202	9.1	−6.5
Turnout		2,215	44.5	
Registered electors		5,126		
Rejected ballots		64	2.8	
Conservative hold		Swing		
Conservative hold		Swing		
Conservative hold		Swing		

=== Hindhead ===
Hindhead (2 seats)
Party	Candidate	Votes	%	±%
Liberal Democrats	Jerome Davidson	544	48.6	+32.7
Conservative	Peter Isherwood	542	48.4	−12.0
Liberal Democrats	Geoffrey Whitby	542	48.4	+34.5
Conservative	Gerrard Hall	437	39.0	−19.8
Labour	David Irwin	79	7.1	N/A
Turnout		1,120	35.6	
Registered electors		3,259		
Rejected ballots		40	3.4	
Liberal Democrats gain from Conservative		Swing		
Conservative hold		Swing		

=== Milford ===
Milford (2 seats)
Party	Candidate	Votes	%	±%
Liberal Democrats	Christine Baker	646	50.7	N/A
Independent	John Lee	629	49.3	+13.6
Conservative	Simon Drake	356	27.9	−35.5
Conservative	Adam Taylor-Smith	315	24.7	−12.6
UKIP	Rosaleen Egan	203	15.9	−7.1
Turnout		1,275	41.0	
Registered electors		3,130		
Rejected ballots		7	0.5	
Liberal Democrats gain from Conservative		Swing		
Independent gain from Conservative		Swing		

=== Shamley Green and Cranleigh North ===
Shamley Green and Cranleigh North (1 seat)
Party	Candidate	Votes	%	±%
Conservative	Chris Howard	Unopposed	N/A	−79.5
Turnout		N/A	N/A	
Registered electors		1,378		
Conservative hold		Swing		

=== Witley and Hambledon ===
Witley and Hambledon (2 seats)
Party	Candidate	Votes	%	±%
Conservative	Jan Floyd-Douglass	617	51.0	−11.7
Conservative	Trevor Sadler	615	50.9	−2.5
Independent	Maxine Gale	601	49.7	N/A
Labour	George Davies	267	22.1	+5.0
Turnout		1,209	40.7	
Registered electors		3,008		
Rejected ballots		16	1.3	
Conservative hold		Swing		
Conservative hold		Swing		

== Changes 2019–2023 ==
- Following the Annual Council meeting on 27 April 2021, Cllr Paul Follows (Liberal Democrat) was elected leader of the council, succeeding Cllr John Ward (Farnham Residents Association), with Cllr Peter Clark (Farnham Residents Association) becoming his deputy.

=== By-elections ===
==== Milford ====
The by-election was triggered by the sudden death of Independent councillor Jack Lee, who had been elected in May 2019.

Milford: 13 February 2020
Party	Candidate	Votes	%	±%
Independent	Maxine Gale	452	50.6	N/A
Conservative	Carmel Oates	328	36.7	+8.8
Independent	Rosaleen Egan	113	12.7	−3.2
Majority		124	13.9	
Turnout		893	28.1	−12.9
Registered electors		3,182		
Rejected ballots		2	0.2	
Independent gain from Independent		Swing	N/A	

==== Cranleigh East ====
The by-election was triggered by the resignation of Liberal Democrat councillor Richard Cole, who moved away from the ward to Devon.

Cranleigh East: 7 October 2021
Party	Candidate	Votes	%	±%
Liberal Democrats	Philip Townsend	903	56.8	+10.3
Conservative	Rosemary Burbridge	686	43.2	+4.6
Majority		217	13.6	
Turnout		1,589	30.6	−2.7
Registered electors		5,205		
Rejected ballots		5	0.3	
Liberal Democrats hold		Swing	+2.8	

==== Frensham, Dockenfield & Tilford ====
The by-election was triggered by the death of Conservative councillor Brian Adams in February 2022.

Frensham, Dockenfield & Tilford: 12 May 2022
Party	Candidate	Votes	%	±%
Independent	David Munro	492	42.1	N/A
Green	Susan Ryland	354	30.3	−10.0
Conservative	Nabeel Nasir	323	27.6	−33.1
Majority		138	11.8	
Turnout		1,169	35.9	−1.6
Registered electors		3,262		
Rejected ballots		2	0.2	
Independent gain from Conservative		Swing	N/A	

==== Hindhead ====
The by-election was triggered by the death of Conservative councillor Peter Isherwood in April 2022, who had represented Hindhead since 1999.

Hindhead: 23 June 2022
Party	Candidate	Votes	%	±%
Liberal Democrats	Julian Spence	537	54.6	+6.2
Conservative	Ged Hall	446	45.4	−3.0
Majority		91	9.2	
Turnout		983	29.8	−5.8
Registered electors		3,331		
Rejected ballots		8	0.8	
Liberal Democrats gain from Conservative		Swing	+4.6	

==== Chiddingfold and Dunsfold ====
The by-election was triggered by the death of long-standing Conservative councillor John Gray.

Chiddingfold and Dunsfold: 1 December 2022
Party	Candidate	Votes	%	±%
Liberal Democrats	Dave Busby	652	66.6	
Conservative	Ian Mitchell	297	30.3	
Labour	Rebecca Aitken	30	3.1	
Majority		355	36.3	
Turnout		979		
Rejected ballots		9	0.9	
Liberal Democrats gain from Conservative		Swing		
