= List of settlements and parishes in Waverley =

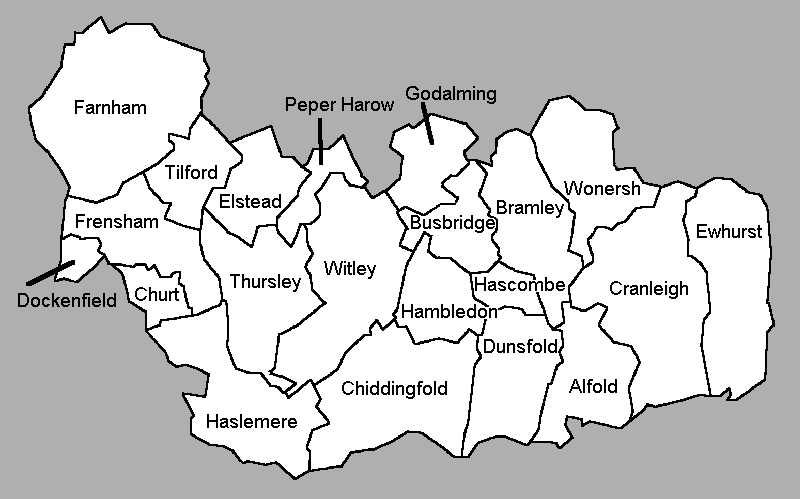

Civil parishes in Waverley are depicted and alphabetically are:

Civil Parish	Villages with a separate article from their parish (not localities) (Note: Apart from Witley, each civil parish is named after the largest settlement in its area.) (Note: Per Wikipedia Guidelines of How to Write About UK Settlements WP:UKTOWNS now expanded to WP:UKVILLAGES, Villages (with a church) and large, distinct and to an extent self-sufficient settlements are worthy of their own article as opposed to sections with the potential of making "Good or Featured Articles"; these so-called "villages" and are shown in the right hand column of the table.)
Alfold
Bramley
Busbridge
Chiddingfold
Churt
Cranleigh
Dockenfield
Dunsfold
Elstead
Ewhurst
Farnham (Note: Settlements in bold are towns)	Badshot Lea, Wrecclesham, Rowledge and Hale
Frensham
Godalming	Farncombe
Hambledon
Hascombe
Haslemere	Hindhead
Peper Harow
Thursley
Tilford
Witley	Milford, that has a much larger population than Witley in Witley
Wonersh

== Notes and references ==
Notes
