= Runnymede Civic Centre =

Municipal building in Addlestone, Surrey, England

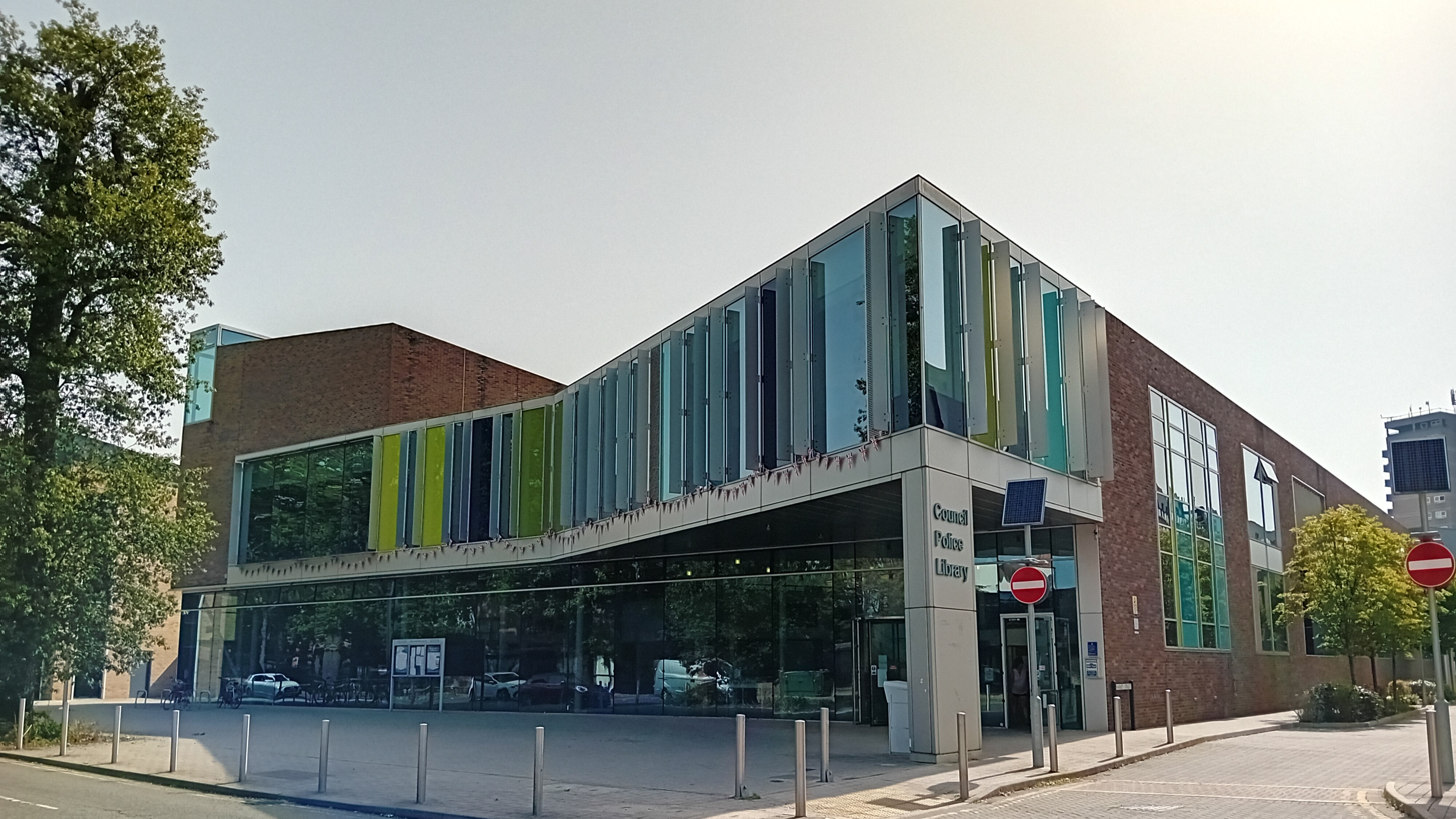
- The building in 2023

- Shown in Surrey
- 51.3706°N 0.4908°W
- Location: Station Road, Addlestone

History
- Built: 2008

Site notes
- Architect: Feilden Clegg Bradley Studios
- Architectural style: Modern style

Runnymede Civic Centre is a municipal building located on Station Road in Addlestone, a town in Surrey, England. It serves as the administrative headquarters and meeting place of the Runnymede Borough Council, and also houses a public library and a police station.

== History ==
In the 19th century, Addlestone was a chapelry within the parish of Chertsey. After Chertsey Urban District Council was established in 1894, the new council was initially based in offices on Guildford Street in Chertsey. However, in the late 1950s, the council decided to commission new offices. The site they selected was on open land on the south side of Station Road in Addlestone.

The council offices were designed in the modern style, built in dark brick, and were completed in 1962. The rear part of the building, which had a rather dull appearance on account of the dark colour of the bricks, was supported on stilts and it featured a landscaped garden. The council offices continued to serve as the offices of Chertsey Urban District Council for another 12 years and then became the headquarters of the enlarged Runnymede Borough Council when it was formed in 1974. In the 1980s, during the Cold War, a bunker was established under the building for use in the event of a nuclear attack.

In the early 2000s, the council decided to relocate to a new civic centre, which would incorporate a library and police station, in addition to the council headquarters. Although it was originally planned to sell the old building, the Great Recession of 2008/2009 reduced demand and so the council decided to demolish the structure instead. The site was later occupied by a Waitrose Supermarket and a Premier Inn.

Meanwhile, the council proceeded with the development of its new civic centre on a site immediately to the east of the previous council offices. The new three-storey building was designed by Feilden Clegg Bradley Studios in the modern style, built by Willmott Dixon in brick and glass at a cost £12.6 million and was officially opened in 2008. In October 2023, it was announced the roof was leaking and would require replacement.

== Architecture ==
The ground floor of the facade is fenestrated in plate glass, to make the building's functions visible from the outside. The right-hand section of the first floor is canted forward and supported by a pier at the north west corner: it is clad in alternating sections of clear and coloured glass. Inside, there is a double-height space housing the library and help desks, with consultation rooms behind, and a wide staircase leading to the upper floors. There is a mezzanine floor with a staff cafe, while the first floor contains the council chamber, a drum-shaped space with desks for councillors in three horseshoes. It is lit by a skylight, with a lantern above which, shines a red light when the council is in session on the second floor and remainder of the first floor house offices, as well as the police control room. The design was one of the regional winners for the 2009 RIBA Awards.
