= West Surrey =

- Future unitary authority area
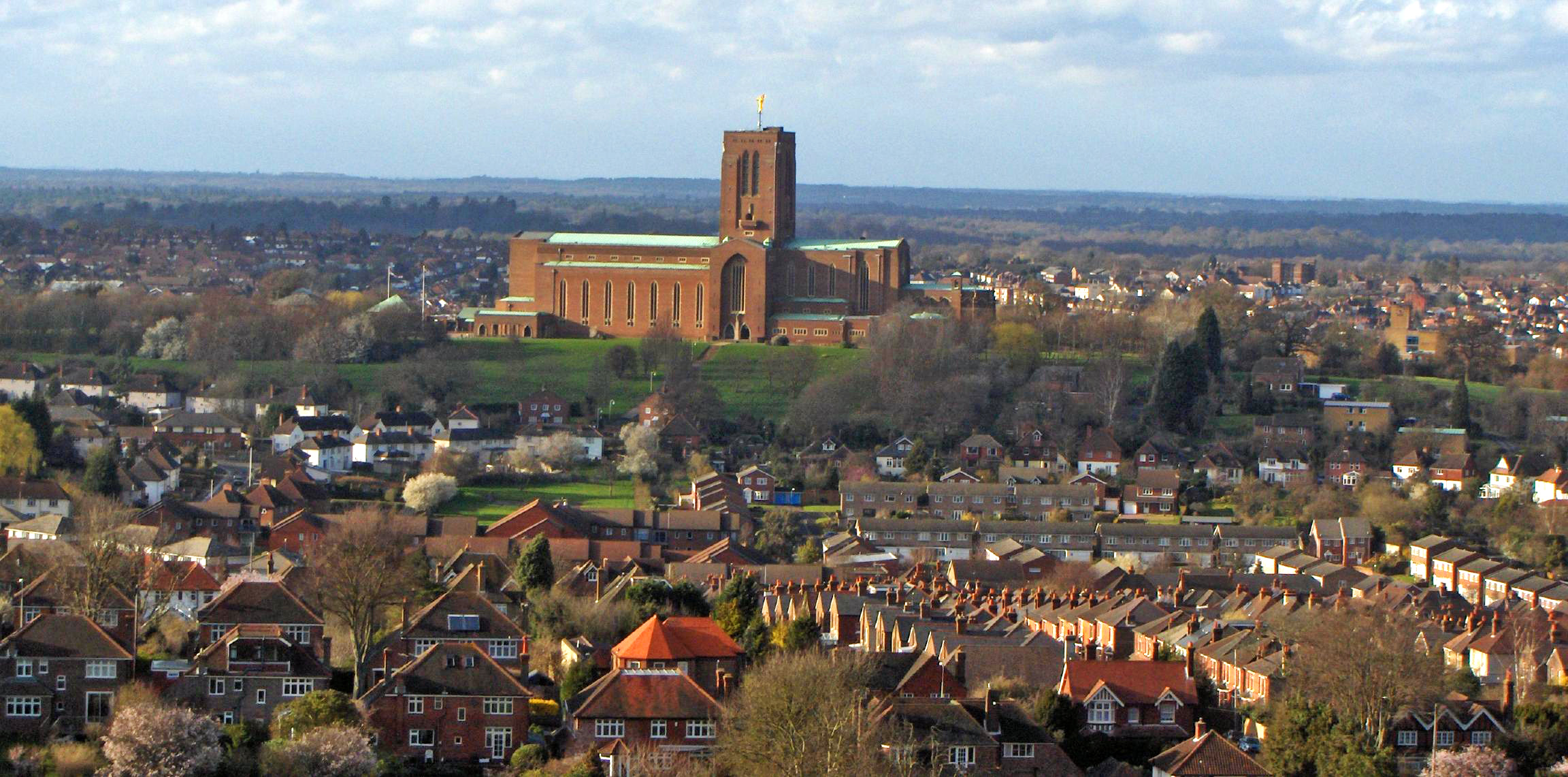
- Guildford and its cathedral

- West Surrey shown within Surrey
- Interactive map of West Surrey
- Coordinates: 51.246°N 0.552°W
- Sovereign state: United Kingdom
- Country: England
- Region: South East
- Ceremonial county: Surrey
- Incorporated: 1 April 2027
- Administrative HQ: Guildford

Government
  - Type: Unitary authority
  - Body: West Surrey Council

Population (2024 estimate)
  - Total: 685,006
- Time zone: UTC+0 (GMT)
  - Summer (DST): UTC+1 (BST)
- GSS code: E06000068

West Surrey is a unitary authority area that will be created on 1 April 2027. It covers the western portion of the ceremonial county of Surrey, including the county town of Guildford. It will replace six districts. In March 2026, secondary legislation was made confirming the new unitary authority area as part of ongoing local government reform. The local authority will be West Surrey Council. On 30 July 2026, the shadow West Surrey Council passed a motion to adopt the name West Surrey and South Middlesex for the area, due to Spelthorne's position in the historic county of Middlesex. The Ministry of Housing, Communities and Local Government has to approve the change of name before it is adopted officially.

== Name ==
Secondary legislation was made on 9 March 2026 for the council to come into operation on 1 April 2027 with the name "West Surrey". Due to the Spelthorne area of the new authority having been part of the historic county of Middlesex, campaigner Russell Grant called for the authority to instead have the name "West Surrey and South Middlesex". On 17 March 2026, Surrey County Council voted to support using the longer name.

Power to rename the unitary authority under the Local Government Act 1972 is held by the newly-elected West Surrey Council that was first elected in May 2026. The proposal to rename the authority was discussed at West Surrey Council's meeting on 30 July 2026, and passed with 58 votes in favour, 15 votes against, and 9 abstentions.

The Ministry of Housing, Communities and Local Government (MHCLG) would have to approve any change of legal name occurring before the council comes into place. Once established, a council has the power to change its legal name with a vote of 2/3 of councillors; councils are also able to use a name other than their legal name for branding. MHCLG stated they would not amend the legislation creating West Surrey to alter its name, meaning a name change would have to occur of the council's own accord.

== Formation ==
Since local government reorganisation in 1974, the area of West Surrey has been divided into the six districts (from north to south) of Spelthorne, Runnymede, Surrey Heath, Woking, Guildford and Waverley.

Following public consultation, creation of West Surrey and West Surrey Council in April 2027 was announced by Steve Reed, the Secretary of State for Housing, Communities and Local Government, in October 2025. He announced that Surrey County Council and its eleven district councils would be abolished and replaced with two unitary authorities to better the financial sustainability of Surrey's local authorities and to improve public service delivery.

In the lowest tier of local government, a lack of this, so unparished areas cover most of the northern half of the area, as well as Guildford town. Guildford's civil organisations are considering the creation of a civil parish for Guildford which would give it a Town Council in line with many towns with a strong tourism sector or identity.

== Governance ==
The governing body for West Surrey will be West Surrey Council, which is due to be established on 1 April 2027. The first councillors were elected in the 2026 West Surrey Council election.

== Geography ==
West Surrey comprises the western part of Surrey and the southernmost part of Middlesex, both historic counties in southeastern England.

The two counties, Middlesex and (greater) Surrey, indirectly administrative predecessors of West Surrey, were substantially reduced by the 1965 creation of Greater London (debated and enacted by the London Government Act 1963. This left Surrey as a rump county, and the most-wooded county in England, at 22.4% wooded. Surrey comprises mixture of rural, suburban and to a lesser extent urban land in the form of many towns and major village centres. Spelthorne/South Middlesex (in common with Thorpe, Surrey) adjacent in the county, had more urban land, balanced with more small parks, and has more land covered in or associated with water including the River Thames, former gravel pits landscaped as lakes and attractions, waterworks, and three large reservoirs. This rump county within 20 years saw the M25 motorway completed and some other motorways built, as well a growth in housing. To prevent over-development and preserve nature, between-settlement and ribbon development constraints by national planning policies and conventions of even longer standing, including the Metropolitan Green Belt and recognitions of existing landscape character are maintained, re-assessed regularly in local plans and National Planning Policy Frameworks determined by Housing and Communities Ministers.

Natural England classifies England into distinct National Character Areas, each defined by landscape, biodiversity and cultural attributes. The southeasternmost portion of West Surrey lies within the Low Weald (NCA 121), transitioning northward to Weald Grassland (NCA 120), followed by a narrow band of the North Downs (NCA 119). Much but not all of these areas falls within the Surrey Hills National Landscape (or AONB). North of the Downs is the Thames Basin, including the Thames Basin Lowlands (NCA 114) around Guildford and the Thames Basin Heaths (NCA 129) further north. Finally, about a dozen settlements, the northernmost, including Staines and Chertsey, are within the Thames Valley (NCA 115).

== See also ==
- East Surrey
