= 2023 Waverley Borough Council election =

2023 English local election

- 4 May 2023

All 50 seats to Waverley Borough Council 26 seats needed for a majority
- Turnout: 39.1%

	First party	Second party	Third party
Leader	Paul Follows	John Ward	Stephen Mulliner (defeated)
Party	Liberal Democrats	Farnham Residents	Conservative
Last election	14 seats, 26.5%	15 seats, 19.6%	23 seats, 39.7%
Seats before	16	14	18
Seats won	22	13	10
Seat change	▲8	▼2	▼13
Popular vote	23,058	10,469	29,116
Percentage	30.1%	13.7%	38.0%
Swing	▲3.6%	▼5.9%	▼1.7%
	Fourth party	Fifth party	Sixth party
Leader	Nick Palmer		Steve Williams
Party	Labour	Independent	Green
Last election	2 seats, 6.7%	1 seat, 1.9%	2 seats, 4.9%
Seats before	2	3	2
Seats won	2	2	1
Seat change	Steady	▲1	▼1
Popular vote	4,488	2,986	6,381
Percentage	5.9%	3.9%	8.3%
Swing	▼0.8%	▲2.0%	▲3.4%
- Winner of each seat at the 2023 Waverley Borough Council election
Leader before election
Paul Follows
Liberal Democrat
No overall control
Leader after election
Paul Follows
Liberal Democrat
No overall control

The 2023 Waverley Borough Council election took place on 4 May 2023 to elect members of Waverley Borough Council in Surrey, England. This was on the same day as other local elections across England.

== Summary ==
New ward boundaries took effect for this election, reducing the number of seats from 57 to 50.

The council was under no overall control prior to the election. The council remained under no overall control afterwards, being run by a coalition of the Liberal Democrats, Farnham Residents, Labour and the Green Party. The leader of the Conservative group, Stephen Mulliner, lost his seat.

=== Election result ===
The overall results were:

2023 Waverley Borough Council election
Party	Candidates	Seats	Gains	Losses	Net gain/loss	Seats %	Votes %	Votes	+/−
Liberal Democrats	25	22	0	0	▲8	44.0	30.1	23,058	+3.6
Farnham Residents	14	13	0	0	▼2	26.0	13.7	10,469	–5.9
Conservative	50	10	0	0	▼13	20.0	38.0	29,116	–1.7
Labour	13	2	0	0	Steady	4.0	5.9	4,488	–0.8
Independent	4	2	0	0	▲1	4.0	3.9	2,986	+2.0
Green	9	1	0	0	▼1	2.0	8.3	6,381	+3.4
Reform	2	0	0	0	Steady	0.0	0.2	115	N/A
TUSC	2	0	0	0	Steady	0.0	<0.1	28	N/A

== Ward results ==
The Statement of Persons Nominated, which details the candidates standing in each ward, was released by Waverley Borough Council following the close of nominations on 4 April 2023. The results for each ward were as follows, with an asterisk (*) indicating a sitting councillor standing for re-election:

=== Alfold, Dunsfold & Hascombe ===
Alfold, Dunsfold & Hascombe (2 seats)
Party	Candidate	Votes	%	±%
Conservative	Kevin Deanus*	572	60.3	
Conservative	Connor Relleen	394	41.6	
Liberal Democrats	Guy Palmer	377	39.8	
Green	Amanda Sampson	257	27.1	
Labour	Zahid Naqvi	94	9.9	
Majority				
Turnout		948	46.3	
Registered electors		2,055		
Rejected ballots		3	0.3	
Conservative win (new seat)				
Conservative win (new seat)				

=== Bramley & Wonersh ===
Bramley & Wonersh (3 seats)
Party	Candidate	Votes	%	±%
Conservative	Jane Austin	1,673	57.7	
Conservative	Lauren Atkins	1,450	50.0	
Conservative	Michael Goodridge*	1,390	47.9	
Liberal Democrats	Mark Vivian	1,077	37.1	
Liberal Democrats	Paul Wright	1,073	37.0	
Green	Martin D'Arcy*	903	31.1	
Labour	Simon Hall	271	9.3	
Labour	Christopher Hard	203	7.0	
Majority				
Turnout		2,901	43.7	
Registered electors		6,673		
Rejected ballots		18	0.6	
Conservative win (new seat)				
Conservative win (new seat)				
Conservative win (new seat)				

=== Chiddingfold ===
Chiddingfold
Party	Candidate	Votes	%	±%
Liberal Democrats	Dave Busby*	668	75.1	
Conservative	Kathleen Thompson	221	24.9	
Majority				
Turnout		889	41.6	
Registered electors		2,146		
Rejected ballots		4	0.4	
Liberal Democrats win (new seat)				

=== Cranleigh East ===
Cranleigh East (3 seats)
Party	Candidate	Votes	%	±%
Liberal Democrats	Philip Townsend*	1,351	64.0	
Liberal Democrats	Ruth Reed*	1,316	62.3	
Liberal Democrats	Ken Reed	1,207	57.1	
Conservative	Stephanie Kelly	666	31.5	
Conservative	Simon Chatfield	617	29.2	
Conservative	Dennis Davidson	597	28.3	
Labour	Mark West	246	11.6	
Majority				
Turnout		2,112	39.4	
Registered electors		5,386		
Rejected ballots		10	0.5	
Liberal Democrats win (new seat)				
Liberal Democrats win (new seat)				
Liberal Democrats win (new seat)				

=== Cranleigh West ===
Cranleigh West (2 seats)
Party	Candidate	Votes	%	±%
Liberal Democrats	Liz Townsend*	1,110	59.9	
Liberal Democrats	Alan Morrison	836	45.1	
Conservative	Christopher Pierce	682	36.8	
Conservative	Thomas Cox	622	33.6	
Labour	Joseph Davies	113	6.1	
Reform	Arthur Barringer	81	4.4	
TUSC	Laurence Dunn	22	1.2	
TUSC	Ellie Waple	6	0.3	
Majority				
Turnout		1,852	40.7	
Registered electors		4,599		
Rejected ballots		18	1.0	
Liberal Democrats win (new seat)				
Liberal Democrats win (new seat)				

=== Elstead & Peper Harow ===
Elstead & Peper Harow
Party	Candidate	Votes	%	±%
Liberal Democrats	Gemma Long	649	60.9	
Conservative	Sheila Dowell	416	39.1	
Majority				
Turnout		1,065	48.2	
Registered electors		2,226		
Rejected ballots		7	0.7	
Liberal Democrats win (new seat)				

=== Ewhurst & Ellens Green ===
Ewhurst & Ellens Green
Party	Candidate	Votes	%	±%
Liberal Democrats	Michael Higgins	462	51.2	
Conservative	Nigel Clowes	377	41.8	
Reform	Keith Nisbet	34	3.8	
Labour	James Mitchell	29	3.2	
Majority				
Turnout		902	47.4	
Registered electors		1,909		
Rejected ballots		2	0.2	
Liberal Democrats win (new seat)				

=== Farnham Bourne ===
Farnham Bourne (2 seats)
Party	Candidate	Votes	%	±%
Conservative	Carole Cockburn*	776	50.8	
Farnham Residents	Christopher Murray	621	40.6	
Farnham Residents	Michaela Martin*	614	40.2	
Conservative	Aly Fitch	533	34.9	
Green	George Wilson	357	23.3	
Majority				
Turnout		1,529	36.3	
Registered electors		4,230		
Rejected ballots		5	0.3	
Conservative win (new seat)				
Farnham Residents win (new seat)				

=== Farnham Castle ===
Farnham Castle (2 seats)
Party	Candidate	Votes	%	±%
Farnham Residents	Heather McClean	621	56.0	
Farnham Residents	George Hesse*	575	51.8	
Labour Co-op	John Gaskell	429	38.7	
Conservative	Clare Ovens	188	17.0	
Conservative	Anthony Watson	172	15.5	
Majority				
Turnout		1,109	29.8	
Registered electors		3,744		
Rejected ballots		6	0.5	
Farnham Residents win (new seat)				
Farnham Residents win (new seat)				

=== Farnham Firgrove ===
Farnham Firgrove (2 seats)
Party	Candidate	Votes	%	±%
Farnham Residents	Kika Mirylees	851	59.6	
Farnham Residents	Jerry Hyman	841	58.9	
Labour	Rebecca Birchwood	454	31.8	
Conservative	Arthur Forrest	239	16.7	
Conservative	William Page	213	14.9	
Majority				
Turnout		1,428	33.4	
Registered electors		4,302		
Rejected ballots		7	0.5	
Farnham Residents win (new seat)				
Farnham Residents win (new seat)				

=== Farnham Heath End ===
Farnham Heath End (2 seats)
Party	Candidate	Votes	%	±%
Farnham Residents	Michaela Wicks*	837	61.7	
Farnham Residents	Tony Fairclough	834	61.5	
Labour	Andrew Jones	360	26.5	
Conservative	Rosamund Croft	233	17.2	
Conservative	Timothy Stacey	214	15.8	
Majority				
Turnout		1,357	32.5	
Registered electors		4,212		
Rejected ballots		10	0.7	
Farnham Residents win (new seat)				
Farnham Residents win (new seat)				

=== Farnham Moor Park ===
Farnham Moor Park (2 seats)
Party	Candidate	Votes	%	±%
Farnham Residents	Andy MacLeod*	981	73.2	
Liberal Democrats	Mark Merryweather*	696	51.9	
Conservative	Sarah Austin	397	29.6	
Conservative	Sean Donovan-Smith	273	20.4	
Majority				
Turnout		1,340	35.5	
Registered electors		3,811		
Rejected ballots		12	0.9	
Farnham Residents win (new seat)				
Liberal Democrats win (new seat)				

=== Farnham North West ===
Farnham North West (2 seats)
Party	Candidate	Votes	%	±%
Farnham Residents	David Beaman*	668	68.1	
Farnham Residents	Graham White	578	58.9	
Green	Natasha Fletcher	261	26.6	
Conservative	Pat Frost	218	22.2	
Conservative	James Pressly	138	14.1	
Majority				
Turnout		981	31.4	
Registered electors		3,146		
Rejected ballots		8	0.8	
Farnham Residents win (new seat)				
Farnham Residents win (new seat)				

=== Farnham Rowledge ===
Farnham Rowledge (2 seats)
Party	Candidate	Votes	%	±%
Farnham Residents	John Ward*	893	58.7	
Farnham Residents	Peter Clark*	818	53.8	
Conservative	David Dearsley	425	27.9	
Conservative	Christopher Storey	379	24.9	
Independent	Mark Westcott	343	22.6	
Majority				
Turnout		1,521	34.9	
Registered electors		4,416		
Rejected ballots		22	1.4	
Farnham Residents win (new seat)				
Farnham Residents win (new seat)				

=== Farnham Weybourne ===
Farnham Weybourne (2 seats)
Party	Candidate	Votes	%	±%
Farnham Residents	Andrew Laughton	737	67.9	
Liberal Democrats	Richard Steijger	632	58.2	
Conservative	Ian Sampson	211	19.4	
Conservative	Anthony Lewis	187	17.2	
Majority				
Turnout		1,085	31.8	
Registered electors		3,428		
Rejected ballots		5	0.5	
Farnham Residents win (new seat)				
Liberal Democrats win (new seat)				

=== Godalming Binscombe & Charterhouse ===
Godalming Binscombe & Charterhouse (3 seats)
Party	Candidate	Votes	%	±%
Liberal Democrats	Paul Rivers*	1,377	55.2	
Green	Stephen Williams*	1,280	51.3	
Labour	Nick Palmer*	1,061	42.5	
Conservative	Steve Cosser*	984	39.5	
Conservative	Ed Holliday	954	38.3	
Conservative	Daniel Husseini	860	34.5	
Majority				
Turnout		2,494	42.7	
Registered electors		5,864		
Rejected ballots		7	0.3	
Liberal Democrats win (new seat)				
Green win (new seat)				
Labour win (new seat)				

=== Godalming Central & Ockford ===
Godalming Central & Ockford (2 seats)
Party	Candidate	Votes	%	±%
Liberal Democrats	Paul Follows*	897	71.4	−2.7
Liberal Democrats	Victoria Kiehl	839	66.8	+6.2
Conservative	Andrew Bolton	374	29.8	+9.6
Conservative	Daren Howell	297	23.6	+4.6
Majority				
Turnout		1,256	37.1	
Registered electors		3,418		
Rejected ballots		12	0.9	
Liberal Democrats win (new seat)				
Liberal Democrats win (new seat)				

=== Godalming Farncombe & Catteshall ===
Godalming Farncombe & Catteshall (2 seats)
Party	Candidate	Votes	%	±%
Liberal Democrats	Penny Rivers*	1,074	70.0	−3.7
Labour	Janet Crowe	718	46.8	+11.5
Conservative	Nick Williams	473	30.8	+2.0
Conservative	Robert Wells	327	21.3	−1.8
Majority				
Turnout		1,535	39.3	
Registered electors		3,933		
Rejected ballots		10	0.6	
Liberal Democrats win (new seat)				
Labour win (new seat)				

=== Godalming Holloway ===
Godalming Holloway (2 seats)
Party	Candidate	Votes	%	±%
Conservative	Peter Martin*	900	44.3	+0.4
Liberal Democrats	Adam Duce	899	44.3	−17.3
Green	Clare Weightman	871	42.9	New
Conservative	Margaret Gray	788	38.8	+0.5
Independent	Adam Clark	310	15.3	New
Majority				
Turnout		2,030	52.8	
Registered electors		3,864		
Rejected ballots		11	0.5	
Conservative win (new seat)				
Liberal Democrats win (new seat)				

=== Haslemere East ===
Haslemere East (3 seats)
Party	Candidate	Votes	%	±%
Liberal Democrats	Peter Nicholson*	1,169	49.2	
Liberal Democrats	Terry Weldon	1,122	47.2	
Conservative	Zoe Barker-Lomax	1,030	43.4	
Conservative	Stephen Mulliner*	976	41.1	
Conservative	Graham Betts	938	39.5	
Green	Claire Matthes	905	38.1	
Labour	Shirley Lewis	327	13.8	
Majority				
Turnout		2,375	42.6	
Registered electors		5,610		
Rejected ballots		13	0.5	
Liberal Democrats win (new seat)				
Liberal Democrats win (new seat)				
Conservative win (new seat)				

=== Haslemere West ===
Haselmere West (2 seats)
Party	Candidate	Votes	%	±%
Liberal Democrats	Jacqueline Keen*	856	68.6	
Liberal Democrats	John Robini*	761	61.0	
Conservative	Stephen Fry	293	23.5	
Conservative	Tom Bridge	257	20.6	
Labour	Toby Westcott-White	183	14.7	
Majority				
Turnout		1,247	35.3	
Registered electors		3,577		
Rejected ballots		14	1.1	
Liberal Democrats win (new seat)				
Liberal Democrats win (new seat)				

=== Hindhead & Beacon Hill ===
Hindhead & Beacon Hill (2 seats)
Party	Candidate	Votes	%	±%
Liberal Democrats	Jerome Davidson*	801	55.9	
Liberal Democrats	Julian Spence*	745	52.0	
Conservative	Malcolm Carter	653	45.6	
Conservative	Ged Hall	559	39.0	
Majority				
Turnout		1,432	37.2	
Registered electors		3,865		
Rejected ballots		7	0.5	
Liberal Democrats win (new seat)				
Liberal Democrats win (new seat)				

=== Western Commons ===
Western Commons (2 seats)
Party	Candidate	Votes	%	±%
Independent	David Munro*	997	67.4	
Conservative	James Staunton	605	40.9	
Green	Susan Ryland	601	40.6	
Conservative	Nabeel Nasir	368	24.9	
Majority				
Turnout		1,479	39.0	
Registered electors		3,800		
Rejected ballots		4	0.3	
Independent win (new seat)				
Conservative win (new seat)				

=== Witley & Milford ===
Witley & Milford (3 seats)
Party	Candidate	Votes	%	±%
Independent	Maxine Gale*	1,336	53.7	
Liberal Democrats	Andrew Law	1,064	42.7	
Conservative	Phoebe Sullivan	1,058	42.5	
Conservative	Gary Hudson	1,057	42.4	
Green	Mark Bray-Parry	946	38.0	
Conservative	Trevor Sadler*	892	35.8	
Majority				
Turnout		2,490	41.7	
Registered electors		5,972		
Rejected ballots		3	0.1	
Independent win (new seat)				
Liberal Democrats win (new seat)				
Conservative win (new seat)				

== Changes 2023–2027 ==
=== By-elections ===
==== Farnham Castle ====
The by-election was triggered by the resignation of Farnham Residents councillor Heather McLean, who cited the pressures of a new job in London.

Farnham Castle: 18 April 2024
Party	Candidate	Votes	%	±%
Farnham Residents	Alan Earwaker	307	32.5	−17.6
Liberal Democrats	Theresa Meredith-Hardy	279	29.6	New
Labour	John Gaskell	217	23.0	−11.7
Conservative	Aly Fitch	141	14.9	−0.2
Majority		28	2.9	
Turnout		944	25.0	−4.8
Registered electors		3,774		
Rejected ballots		1	0.1	
Farnham Residents hold		Swing		

==== Witley and Milford ====
The by-election was triggered by the death of Liberal Democrat councillor Andrew Law in January 2024.

Witley and Milford: 2 May 2024
Party	Candidate	Votes	%	±%
Liberal Democrats	Laura Cavaliere	1,152	44.7	+2.0
Conservative	Gary Hudson	902	35.0	−7.4
Independent	Tony Sollars	526	20.4	New
Majority		250	9.9	
Turnout		2,580		
Rejected ballots		11	0.4	
Liberal Democrats hold		Swing		

==== Godalming Binscombe & Charterhouse ====
The by-election was triggered by the resignation of Labour councillor Nick Palmer, who moved away from the ward.

Godalming Binscombe & Charterhouse: 24 September 2024
Party	Candidate	Votes	%	±%
Conservative	Daniel Husseini	725	40.6	+6.1
Liberal Democrats	James Barratt	714	40.0	−15.2
Green	David Faraday	195	10.9	−40.4
Labour	Ben Knight	151	8.5	−34.0
Majority		11	0.6	
Turnout		1,785		
Registered electors		6,076		
Rejected ballots		3	0.2	
Conservative gain from Labour		Swing		
