= Dockenfield =

Village and parish in Surrey, England

Coordinates: 51.158498°N 0.816035°W

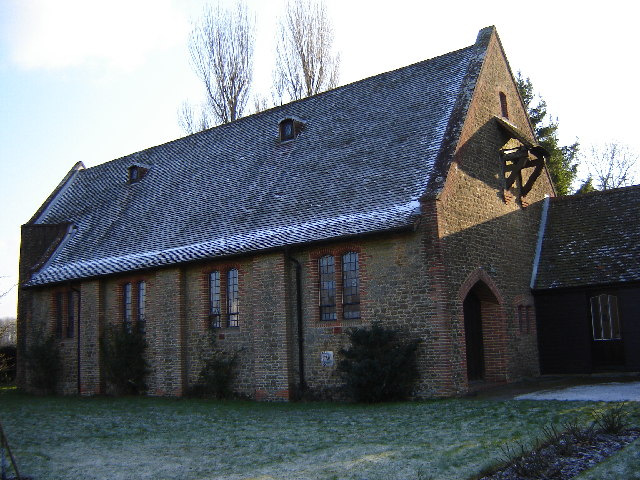
- Church of the Good Shepherd, built in 1910 by William Curtis Green

- Location within Surrey
- Area: 2.73 km^{2} (1.05 sq mi)
- Population: 399 (Civil Parish 2011)
  - Density: 146/km^{2} (380/sq mi)
- OS grid reference: SU8340
- Civil parish: Dockenfield
- District: Waverley
- Shire county: Surrey
- Region: South East
- Country: England
- Sovereign state: United Kingdom
- Post town: Farnham
- Postcode district: GU10
- Dialling code: 01252
- Police: Surrey
- Fire: Surrey
- Ambulance: South East Coast
- UK Parliament: Farnham and Bordon

Dockenfield is a village and civil parish in the borough of Waverley in Surrey, England. The parish is undulating, has a number of sources of the River Wey and borders the Alice Holt Forest. Dockenfield was historically part of Hampshire, being transferred to Surrey in 1895.

== History ==
Dockenfield was one of the unnamed tythings of Farnham owned by the Bishop of Winchester at the time of the Domesday Book in 1086. It was recorded in the Calendar of the Close Rolls of Edward III (reigned 1327–1377) as "Dockenfield, Dokkenfeld, co. Southampton".

Dockenfield formed part of the ancient parish of Frensham, and still belongs to that ecclesiastical parish. The parish formerly straddled the county boundary between Surrey and Hampshire. In 1866 the part of Frensham parish within Hampshire, being the tything of Dockenfield, was made a separate civil parish.

In 1887 John Bartholomew's Gazetteer of the British Isles described Dockenfield as a parish in North Hants. 3.5 miles (5.6 km) south-west of Farnham railway station covering 578 acres (234 ha) with a population of 209. This area remained constant from 1881 to 1961.

In 1881, at the time of its census, 43% of men were employed in agriculture, 6% were employed in domestic or furnishing occupations; various other categories follow, ended by the smallest percentages 2% were in each of the categories of transport and communications, 2% were 'professionals'. 15% of men did not specify an occupation. At that time the greatest percentage of employment for women was unknown (27%) followed by domestic service or similar, however only 4% of women of the parish were in that category. By the 2001 census, its area had fallen to 273 acres (110 ha).

When elected parish and district councils were created in 1894, Dockenfield was included in the Farnham Rural District; the rest of the district apart from Dockenfield was in Surrey and the district had to be given special dispensation to allow it to straddle Surrey and Hampshire temporarily. The anomaly was resolved with effect from 30 September 1895 when the parish of Dockenfield was transferred to Surrey.

== Geography ==
The west of the parish adjoins Alice Holt Forest, part of the South Downs National Park.

The east of the parish is marked by the River Wey (south branch) middle of the parish forms a ridge crowned by two small knolls; all of the parish drains into this watercourse, but in the south of the parish the land slopes to the south, whereas in the north an east–west stream rising in the parish drains the main settled part of the village, which is in terms of its housing, a linear settlement with four settled cul-de-sacs.

== Landmarks ==
Dockenfield has no listed buildings or parks (public or private). The Church of the Good Shepherd, built 1910, by the English architect William Curtis Green, village hall and war memorial on The Street connect religious and secular occasions to the village's established community.

== Demography and housing ==
Historic

The population in 2001 of 421 decreased in the ten years to the 2011 United Kingdom census by 22. The percentage of residents in 2011 who responded that they were in very good health, 58.9% was above the average for the district, region and country – 11.7% higher than the country as a whole.

The number of homes rose, following a slight decrease at the end of the Victorian period from 59 in 1901 to 98 in 1961. The population gradually rose to reach a peak of 519 in 1951 living in only 97 homes and decreased to 406 over the following ten years.

Current

2011 Census Homes
Output area	Detached	Semi-detached	Terraced	Flats and apartments	Caravans/temporary/mobile homes	shared between households
(Civil Parish)	99	43	6	10	0	0

The average level of accommodation in the region composed of detached houses was 28%, the average that was apartments was 22.6%.

2011 Census Key Statistics
Output area	Population	Households	% Owned outright	% Owned with a loan	hectares
(Civil Parish)	399	158	45.6%	40.5%	273

The proportion of households in the civil parish who owned their home outright compares to the regional average of 35.1%. The proportion who owned their home with a loan compares to the regional average of 32.5%. The remaining % is made up of rented dwellings (plus a negligible % of households living rent-free).

== Governance ==
There are three tiers of local government covering Dockenfield, at parish, district (borough) and county level: Dockenfield Parish Council, Waverley Borough Council and Surrey County Council.
