= 2015 Waverley Borough Council election =

2015 UK local government election

Results of the 2015 Waverley Borough Council election

The 2015 Waverley Borough Council election took place on 7 May 2015 to elect members of Waverley Borough Council in England as one of the 2015 local elections, held simultaneously with the General Election.

== Results ==
In 2011 Conservatives won all seats except one won by an independent, but saw in the four years three defections of councillors opposed to the group's intra-borough priorities.

Defections considered, the 2015 result saw the same number of Conservatives returned to the council, with areas of politically standing residents associations winning three seats compensating, as the bulk of opposition, for the loss of three Independent seats across the borough to Conservatives. There was only one other party represented, UKIP, in the form of Diane James, MEP, who lost her majority in single-seat Elstead to a Conservative, her winning denomination in the last election. An independent picked up a seat to balance the majority, Conservative, grouping as the same as immediately before the election.

Waverley Borough Council Election, 2015
Party	Seats	Gains	Losses	Net gain/loss	Seats %	Votes %	Votes	+/−
Conservative	53	4	4	0	93	52	47004	
Residents	3	3	0	+3	5	5	4662	
Independent	1	1	3	-2	2	7	6396	
Liberal Democrats	0	0	0	0	0	15	13591	
Labour	0	0	0	0	0	13	11341	
UKIP	0	0	1	-1	0	5	4142	
Green	0	0	0	0	0	3	2760	
Something Else	0	0	0	0	0	0.5	485	

=== Ward by ward ===
Alfold, Cranleigh Rural and Ellens Green (1 seat)
Party	Candidate	Votes	%	±%
Conservative	Kevin Deanus	678		
UKIP	John Armstrong	178		
Labour	Connor Carey	113		
Independent	Peter Hartley	109		
Majority				
Turnout				
Conservative hold		Swing		

Blackheath & Wonersh (1 seat) (uncontested)
Party	Candidate	Votes	%	±%
Conservative	Michael Goodridge	0		
Majority				
Conservative hold		Swing		

Bramley, Busbridge and Hascombe (2 seats)
Party	Candidate	Votes	%	±%
Conservative	Maurice Byham	1893		
Conservative	Thomas Seaborne	1707		
Labour	Carles Martinez	555		
Majority				
Turnout				
Conservative hold		Swing		
Conservative hold		Swing		

Chiddingfold and Dunsfold (2 seats)
Party	Candidate	Votes	%	±%
Conservative	Simon Inchbald	1445		
Conservative	John Gray	1306		
Labour	Tony Johnson	460		
UKIP	Ian Mitchell	418		
Majority				
Turnout				
Conservative hold		Swing		
Conservative hold		Swing		

Cranleigh East (3 seats)
Party	Candidate	Votes	%	±%
Conservative	Mary Foryszewski	1652		
Conservative	Jeanette Stennett	1600		
Conservative	Stewart Stennett	1570		
Lib Dems	Ken Reed	901		
Lib Dems	Richard Cole	879		
Lib Dems	Ruth Reed	831		
Independent	David Inman	600		
Labour	Mark West	509		
Labour	Mark Liversedge	490		
Majority				
Turnout				
Conservative gain from Independent		Swing		
Conservative hold		Swing		
Conservative hold		Swing		

Cranleigh West (2 seats)
Party	Candidate	Votes	%	±%
Conservative	Patricia Ellis	1269		
Conservative	Brian Ellis	1155		
Lib Dems	Louise Jones	685		
Lib Dems	Chris Tew	515		
Labour	Lynda Macdermott	321		
Labour	Daniel Nunn	192		
Majority				
Turnout				
Conservative hold		Swing		
Conservative hold		Swing		

Dockenfield & Tilford (2 seats) (uncontested)
Party	Candidate	Votes	%	±%
Conservative	Brian Adams	0		
Conservative	Ged Hall	0		
Majority				
Turnout				
Conservative hold		Swing		
Conservative hold		Swing		

Elstead and Thursley (2 seats)
Party	Candidate	Votes	%	±%
Conservative	Jennifer Else	1593		
Conservative	David Else	1376		
Independent	Bryn Morgan	846		
Majority				
Turnout				
Conservative gain from Independent		Swing		
Conservative hold		Swing		

Ewhurst (1 seat)
Party	Candidate	Votes	%	±%
Conservative	Val Henry	703		
UKIP	Diane James	406		
Lib Dems	Gus Reed	137		
Majority				
Turnout				
Conservative gain from UKIP		Swing		

Farnham Bourne (2 seats) (uncontested)
Party	Candidate	Votes	%	±%
Conservative	Carole Cockburn	N/A		
Conservative	Martin Lear	N/A		
Majority				
Turnout				
Conservative hold		Swing		
Conservative hold		Swing		

Farnham Castle (2 seats)
Party	Candidate	Votes	%	±%
Farnham Residents	John Williamson	1043		
Conservative	Paddy Blagden	797		
Lib Dems	Stewart Edge	736		
Conservative	Geoffrey Swann	641		
Labour	Celia Sandars	458		
Majority				
Turnout				
Conservative hold		Swing		
Residents gain from Conservative		Swing		

Farnham Firgrove (2 seats)
Party	Candidate	Votes	%	±%
Conservative	Jill Hargreaves	1260		
Conservative	Sam Pritchard	934		
Green	Jon Austen	733		
Lib Dems	Sylvia Jacobs	716		
Labour	David Savage	426		
Majority				
Turnout				
Conservative gain from Independent		Swing		
Conservative hold		Swing		

Farnham Hale & Heath End (2 seats)
Party	Candidate	Votes	%	±%
Conservative	Mike Hodge	1170		
Conservative	Denise Le Gal	917		
Independent	David Beaman	696		
Lib Dems	Mary Hunt	523		
Labour	Rebecca Kaye	501		
Majority				
Turnout				
Conservative hold		Swing		
Conservative hold		Swing		

Farnham Moor Park (2 seats)
Party	Candidate	Votes	%	±%
Conservative	Stephen Hill	1086		
Independent	Andy Macleod	1006		
Conservative	Rachel Morris	918		
Lib Dems	Judith Edge	638		
Labour	David Watts	437		
Majority				
Turnout				
Independent hold		Swing		
Conservative hold		Swing		

Farnham Shortheath & Boundstone (2 seats)
Party	Candidate	Votes	%	±%
Conservative	David Munro	1064		
Farnham Residents	Kika Mirylees	958		
Conservative	John Ward	806		
Farnham Residents	Jane Sinclair	781		
Labour	Joan Anniballi	337		
Majority				
Turnout				
Conservative hold		Swing		
Residents gain from Conservative		Swing		

Farnham Upper Hale (2 seats)
Party	Candidate	Votes	%	±%
Farnham Residents	John Fraser	1061		
Conservative	Julia Potts	927		
Farnham Residents	Jerry Hyman	819		
Conservative	Donal O'Neill	724		
Labour	Carole Thomas	328		
Majority				
Turnout				
Conservative hold		Swing		
Residents gain from Conservative		Swing		

Farnham Weybourne and Badshot Lea (2 seats)
Party	Candidate	Votes	%	±%
Conservative	Christopher Storey	985		
Conservative	Nabeel Nasir	964		
Lib Dems	William Marshall	816		
UKIP	Mike Bryan	748		
Labour	Andrew Jones	453		
Majority				
Turnout				
Conservative hold		Swing		
Conservative hold		Swing		

Farnham Wrecclesham and Rowledge (2 seats)
Party	Candidate	Votes	%	±%
Conservative	Pat Frost	1429		
Conservative	Robert Ramsdale	1281		
Independent	Mark Wescott	688		
Labour	Anthony Watts	555		
UKIP	Jim Burroughs	517		
Majority				
Turnout				
Conservative hold		Swing		
Conservative hold		Swing		

Godalming Binscombe (2 seats)
Party	Candidate	Votes	%	±%
Conservative	David Hunter	999		
Conservative	Liz Wheatley	898		
Lib Dems	Paul Rivers	738		
Labour	Stephen Williams	677		
Majority				
Turnout				
Conservative hold		Swing		
Conservative hold		Swing		

Godalming Central and Ockford (2 seats)
Party	Candidate	Votes	%	±%
Conservative	Andrew Bolton	1180		
Conservative	Simon Thornton	1024		
Labour	George Davies	743		
Something New	Paul Robinson	485		
UKIP	Brian Egan	437		
Majority				
Turnout				
Conservative hold		Swing		
Conservative hold		Swing		

Godalming Charterhouse (2 seats)
Party	Candidate	Votes	%	±%
Conservative	Tony Gordon-Smith	1260		
Conservative	Stefan Reynolds	1067		
Green	James Coope	708		
Labour	Eleanor Griffiths	549		
Majority				
Turnout				
Conservative hold		Swing		
Conservative hold		Swing		

Godalming Farncombe and Catteshall (2 seats)
Party	Candidate	Votes	%	±%
Conservative	Ross Welland	1152		
Conservative	Nick Williams	1030		
Lib Dems	Penny Rivers	712		
Green	Shirley Wardell	518		
Labour	Robert Park	465		
Labour	Michael Williams	448		
Lib Dems	Patrick Haveron	345		
Majority				
Turnout				
Conservative hold		Swing		
Conservative hold		Swing		

Godalming Holloway (2 seats)
Party	Candidate	Votes	%	±%
Conservative	Peter Martin	1844		
Conservative	Tom Martin	1688		
Labour	Luis Pullen	770		
Majority				
Turnout				
Conservative hold		Swing		
Conservative hold		Swing		

Haslemere Critchmere and Shottermill (3 seats)
Party	Candidate	Votes	%	±%
Conservative	Jim Edwards	1658		
Conservative	Carole King	1508		
Conservative	Libby Piper	1417		
Lib Dems	Jacqueline Keen	1075		
Lib Dems	Peter Nicholson	794		
Lib Dems	John Robini	762		
Labour	Shaf Hansraj	563		
Majority				
Turnout				
Conservative hold		Swing		
Conservative hold		Swing		
Conservative hold		Swing		

Haslemere East and Grayswood (3 seats)
Party	Candidate	Votes	%	±%
Conservative	Stephen Mulliner	2052		
Conservative	Robert Knowles	1966		
Conservative	David Round	1818		
Independent	Lesley Banfield	1128		
Lib Dems	Elizabeth Pamplin	879		
Labour	Paul Croshaw	605		
UKIP	Gail Weingartner	543		
Majority				
Conservative hold		Swing		
Turnout				
Conservative hold		Swing		
Conservative hold		Swing		

Hindhead (2 seats)
Party	Candidate	Votes	%	±%
Conservative	Peter Isherwood	1416		
Conservative	Christiaan Hesse	1380		
Green	Sasha Brooks	408		
Green	Susan Ryland	393		
Lib Dems	Jerome Davidson	373		
Lib Dems	Geoffrey Whitby	325		
Majority				
Turnout				
Conservative hold		Swing		
Conservative hold		Swing		

Milford (2 seats)
Party	Candidate	Votes	%	±%
Conservative	Denis Leigh	1436		
Conservative	Bob Upton	845		
Independent	Jack Lee	808		
UKIP	Guy Jones	521		
Majority				
Turnout				
Conservative hold		Swing		
Conservative hold		Swing		

Shamley Green and Cranleigh North (1 seat)
Party	Candidate	Votes	%	±%
Conservative	Mike Band	819		
Lib Dems	Fabian Cole	211		
Majority				
Turnout				
Conservative hold		Swing		

Witley and Hambledon (2 seats)
Party	Candidate	Votes	%	±%
Conservative	Nick Holder	1440		
Conservative	Anna James	1204		
Independent	David Hall	515		
Labour	Yvonne Manning	386		
UKIP	Rosaleen Egan	374		
Majority				
Turnout				
Conservative hold		Swing		
Conservative hold		Swing		
