= Borough of Waverley =

Coordinates: 51°11′3.45″N 0°37′3.29″W

- Non-metropolitan district and Borough
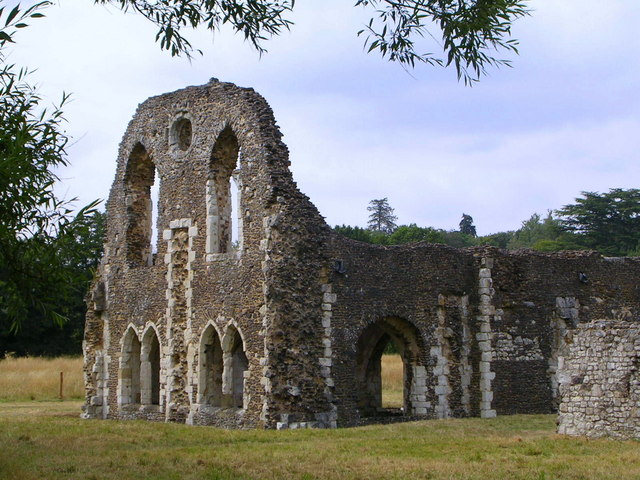
- Waverley Abbey, after which the borough is named.
- Motto: Oppida Rusque Una (Latin: Town and countryside in unity)
- Waverley shown within Surrey
- Sovereign state: United Kingdom
- Constituent country: England
- Region: South East England
- Non-metropolitan county: Surrey
- Status: Non-metropolitan district
- Admin HQ: Godalming
- Incorporated: 1 April 1974

Government
  - Type: Non-metropolitan district council
  - Body: Waverley Borough Council
  - Leadership: Leader & Cabinet
  - MPs: Jeremy Hunt; Greg Stafford

Area
  - Total: 133.3 sq mi (345.2 km^{2})
  - Rank: 104th (of 296)

Population (2024)
  - Total: 134,284
  - Rank: 183rd (of 296)
  - Density: 1,008/sq mi (389.0/km^{2})

Ethnicity (2021)
  - Ethnic groups: List: 93.7% White; 2.8% Asian; 2.2% Mixed; 0.7% Black; 0.6% other

Religion (2021)
  - Religion: List: 51.9% Christianity; 39% no religion; 6.3% not stated; 1.2% Islam; 0.6% Buddhism; 0.6% Hinduism; 0.5% other; 0.2% Judaism; 0.1% Sikhism
- Time zone: UTC0 (GMT)
  - Summer (DST): UTC+1 (BSTa)
- ONS code: 43UL (ONS); E07000216 (GSS)
- OS grid reference: SU9660743750

The Borough of Waverley is a local government district with borough status in Surrey, England. The borough contains the towns of Godalming, Farnham and Haslemere, as well as numerous villages, including the large village of Cranleigh, and surrounding rural areas. At the 2021 Census, the population of the borough was 128,200. The borough is named after Waverley Abbey, near Farnham. Large parts of the borough are within the Surrey Hills National Landscape. Its council, Waverley Borough Council, is based in Godalming.

The neighbouring districts are Guildford, Mole Valley, Horsham, Chichester, East Hampshire, Hart and Rushmoor.

== History ==
The district was formed on 1 April 1974 under the Local Government Act 1972. The new district covered the area of four former districts, which were all abolished at the same time:

- Farnham Urban District
- Godalming Municipal Borough
- Haslemere Urban District
- Hambledon Rural District

The new district was named after Waverley Abbey in the parish of Farnham, which was the earliest Cistercian monastery in Britain.

For the first six years of its existence, the council was based outside the district at the former Hambledon Rural District Council's offices at Bury Fields in Guildford. In April 1980, the council moved to purpose-built headquarters at The Burys in Godalming, behind Godalming Borough Hall. The district was awarded borough status on 21 February 1984, allowing the chair of the council to take the title of mayor.

The Borough of Waverley and its council, along with all Surrey districts will be abolished in 2027 as part of ongoing local government restructuring, with the area of Waverley to become part of West Surrey, administered by West Surrey Council.

== Governance ==
Waverley Borough Council

Type
- Type: Non-metropolitan district

Leadership
- Mayor: David Munro, Independent since 19 May 2026
- Leader: Paul Follows, Liberal Democrat since 27 April 2021
- Chief Executive: Pedro Wrobel since 8 April 2024

Structure
- Seats: 50 councillors
- Political groups: Administration (25) Liberal Democrats (24) Green (1) Other parties (25) Conservative (11) Farnham Residents (10) Independent (4)

Elections
- Voting system: First past the post
- First election: 7 June 1973
- Last election: 4 May 2023

Meeting place
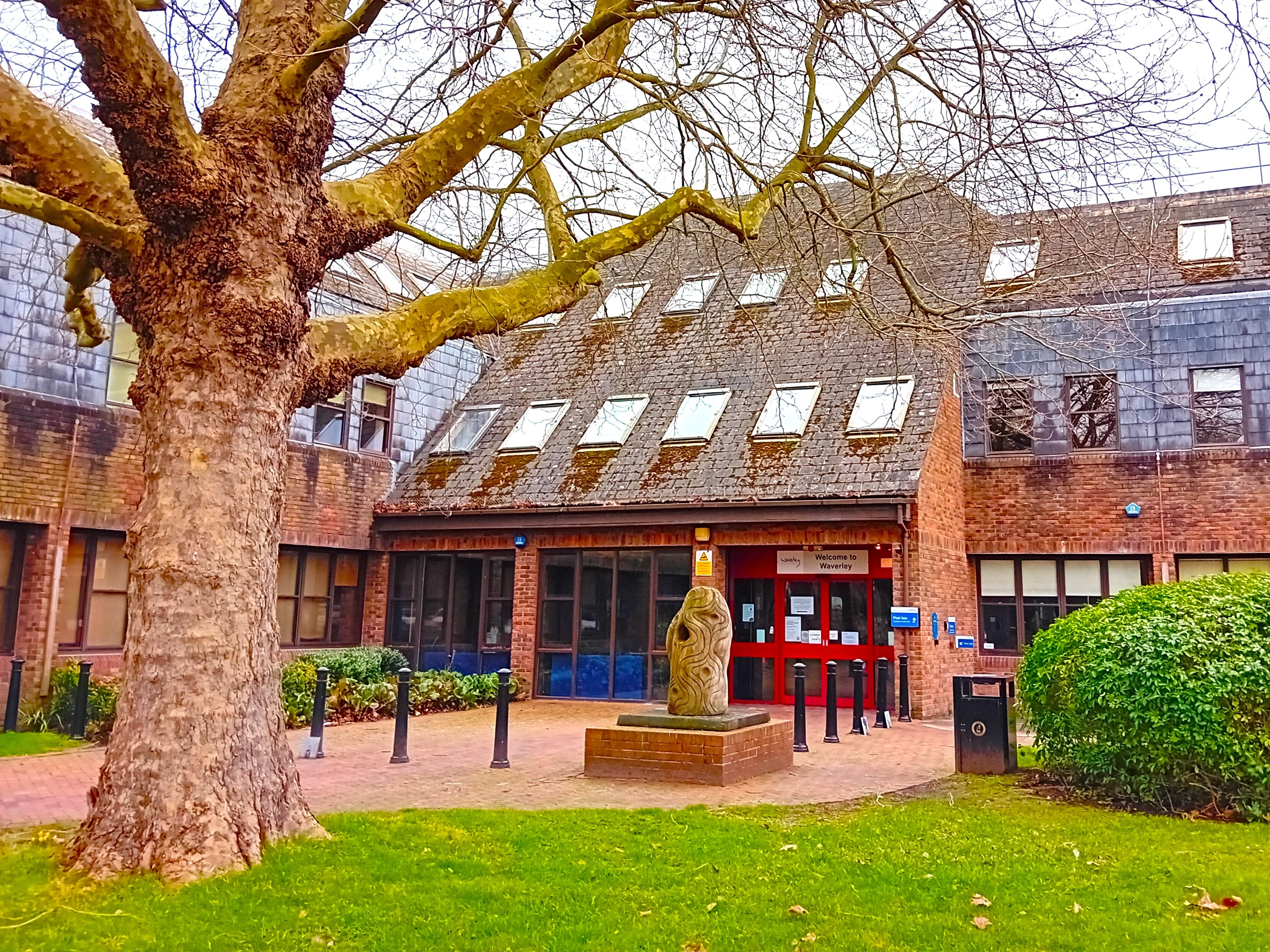
- Council Offices, The Burys, Godalming, GU7 1HR

Website
- www.waverley.gov.uk

Waverley Borough Council provides district-level services. County-level services are provided by Surrey County Council. The whole borough is also covered by civil parishes, which form a third tier of local government.

The council has shared a chief executive with neighbouring Guildford Borough Council since 2021.

=== Political control ===
The council has been under no overall control since 2019. A coalition then formed to run the council, comprising the Liberal Democrats, Farnham Residents, Labour and Greens. The same coalition continued to run the council following the 2023 election. In February 2026, the Farnham Residents withdrew from the coalition.

The first election to the council was held in 1973, initially operating as a shadow authority alongside the outgoing authorities until the new arrangements took effect on 1 April 1974. Political control of the council since 1974 has been as follows:

Party in control	Years
No overall control	1974–1976
Conservative	1976–1991
No overall control	1991–1995
Liberal Democrats	1995–1999
Conservative	1999–2003
Liberal Democrats	2003–2004
No overall control	2004–2007
Conservative	2007–2019
No overall control	2019–present

=== Leadership ===
The role of mayor is largely ceremonial in Waverley. Political leadership is instead provided by the leader of the council. The leaders since 2003 have been:

Councillor	Party	From	To
Chris Slyfield	Liberal Democrats	2003	Feb 2005
Gillian Ferguson	Liberal Democrats	22 Feb 2005	May 2007
Richard Gates	Conservative	May 2007	May 2010
Robert Knowles	Conservative	11 May 2010	10 May 2016
Julia Potts	Conservative	10 May 2016	May 2019
John Ward	Farnham Residents	21 May 2019	27 Apr 2021
Paul Follows	Liberal Democrats	27 Apr 2021	

Paul Follows was additionally appointed as the leader of the shadow authority for the new West Surrey Council at its inaugural meeting in Guildford on 21 May 2026.

=== Composition ===
Following the 2023 election, and subsequent changes up to July 2026, the composition of the council was:

Party	Councillors
Liberal Democrats	24
Farnham Residents	10
Conservative	11
Green	1
Independent	4
Total	50

Two of the independent councillors sit with local party the Farnham Residents as the "Farnham Residents and Aligned Independents" group. The other two independent councillors do not belong to a group.

=== Elections ===
Since the last boundary changes in 2023 the council has comprised 50 councillors representing 24 wards, with each ward electing one, two or three councillors. Elections were held every four years.

Further borough council elections were cancelled in 2026, and an election for the new West Surrey Council was held instead. West Surrey Council will formally come into being and take over local government functions in the area on 1 April 2027, at which point Waverley Borough Council and the borough of Waverley will be abolished.

== Geography ==
Waverley's landscape is influenced by its position within the landform of the Weald. It contains parts of the North Downs and the Greensand Ridge and large parts of the borough are within the Surrey Hills AONB. It has the most green space in absolute terms in Surrey at 293.1 km^{2} (113.2 sq mi) according to the central government-compiled Generalised Land Use database of January 2005, approximately half of which is woodland.

Blackheath Common, in the north of the borough, is a Site of Special Scientific Interest, as is the Devil's Punch Bowl in the south of the district.

== Demography ==
A Legatum Prosperity Index published by the Legatum Institute in October 2016 showed Waverley as the most prosperous council area in the United Kingdom.

== Twinning ==
- Mayen-Koblenz in Germany dates from 1977.

== Civil parishes ==
Waverley is entirely divided into civil parishes. The parish councils for Farnham, Godalming and Haslemere take the style "town council".

- Alfold
- Bramley
- Chiddingfold
- Churt
- Cranleigh
- Dockenfield
- Dunsfold
- Elstead
- Ewhurst
- Farnham (town)
- Frensham
- Godalming (town)
- Hambledon
- Hascombe
- Haslemere (town)
- Peper Harow
- Thursley
- Tilford
- Tuesley and Munstead
- Witley and Milford
- Wonersh

See List of settlements and parishes in Waverley

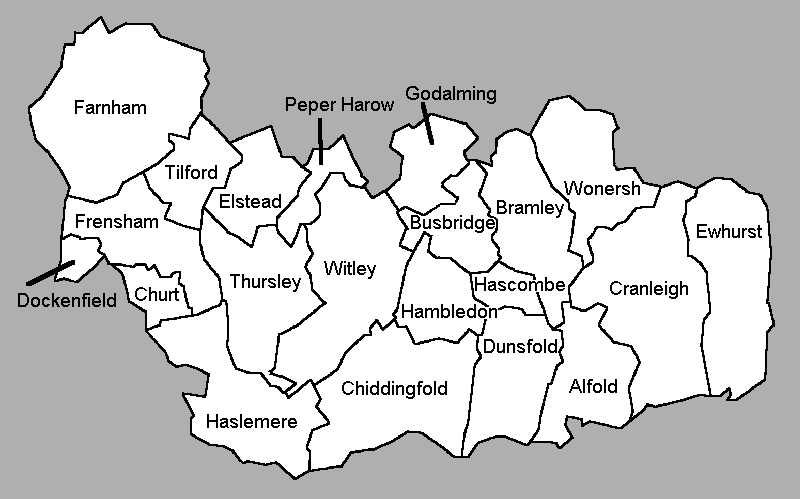

== See also ==
- List of places of worship in Waverley (borough)
- Waverley Borough Council elections
