= West Surrey Council =

Planned unitary authority in Surrey, England

- Council logo

Type
- Type: Unitary authority of West Surrey

History
- Founded: 1 April 2027
- Preceded by: Surrey County Council

Leadership
- Chair: Penny Rivers, Liberal Democrats since 21 May 2026
- Leader: Paul Follows, Liberal Democrats since 21 May 2026

Structure
- Political groups: Administration (56) Liberal Democrats (56) Other parties (34) Conservative (20) Reform UK (8) Indepedents' Group (5) (Note: Farnham Residents (2); RIRG (1); R4GV (1); Independent (1)) Independent (1)
- Length of term: 4 years
- Salary: No salary, but an annual taxable basic allowance of £12,072

Elections
- Voting system: First past the post
- First election: 7 May 2026

Meeting place
- Millmead House, Millmead, Guildford

Website
- West Surrey Shadow Authority

West Surrey Council is a shadow English unitary authority for the local government district of West Surrey.

== History ==
As part of the Starmer ministry's planned local government reform (as set out by the English Devolution White Paper), a goal of "simpler local government structures", was set out by the government, including a commitment to phase out two tier local government structures. Surrey County Council applied to be part of the Devolution Priority Programme in 2025, which would fast-track the transition to a new local government arrangement. Surrey County Council, Mole Valley District Council, and Elmbridge Borough Council proposed a setup with two unitary authorities, whilst Epsom and Ewell, Guildford, Reigate and Banstead, Runnymede, Spelthorne, Surrey Heath, Waverley, Woking Borough Councils, and Tandridge District Council proposed a setup with three unitary authorities.

On 28 October 2025, the government announced its decision for two authorities to cover Surrey, though this raised concerns amongst local leaders around the financial position of the new West Surrey Council

A spokesperson for Surrey Liberal Democrat MPs Zöe Franklin, Will Forster, and Al Pinkerton said that the party had concerns that the council would be "bankrupt from day one", with BBC figures showing that the districts forming West Surrey have a combined £4.5 billion in debt.

== Governance ==
The 2026 West Surrey Council election took place on 7 May 2026. The authority will take over local government responsibilities on 1 April 2027, and will operate as a shadow authority before then.

=== Control ===
The inaugural election in 2026 saw the Liberal Democrats win a majority of the seats on the new authority.

Party in control	Years
Liberal Democrats	May 2026–present

=== Leadership ===
Political leadership is provided by the leader of the council. Paul Follows of the Liberal Democrats, leader of the outgoing Waverley Borough Council, was formally appointed as the leader of the shadow authority at its inaugural meeting in Guildford on 21 May 2026.

Councillor	Party	From	To
Paul Follows	Liberal Democrats	May 2026	

== Name ==
In March 2026, Surrey County Council voted for a motion to support changing the council name to "West Surrey and South Middlesex". The power to rename the council is held by the new West Surrey Council and would need to be approved by the Secretary of State for Housing, Communities and Local Government. The shadow council voted to approve the West Surrey and South Middlesex name on 30 July 2026 with the move supported by the Liberal Democrat group and opposed by the Conservative group. In October 2026, the government rejected the route for the name change that the shadow authority had suggested, saying that the a more direct route under the Local Government Act 1972 or using a brand name without a formal legal change of name would be more appropriate.

== See also ==
- 2024–present structural changes to local government in England
- East Surrey Council
