= 2026 West Surrey Council election =

2026 English local government election

- 7 May 2026

All 90 seats to West Surrey Council 46 seats needed for a majority
- Registered: 488,899
- Turnout: 225,203 (46%)

	First party	Second party	Third party
Leader	Paul Follows (Note: Elected group leader after the election.)	Jane Austin	Jim McIlroy
Party	Liberal Democrats	Conservative	Reform
Seats before	11 (22)	25 (50)	0
Seats won	56	20	9
Seat change	▲34	▼30	▲9
Popular vote	155,500	108,519	89,866
Percentage	35.92%	25.07%	20.76%
	Fourth party	Fifth party	Sixth party
Leader	Catherine Powell
Party	Farnham Residents	Independent	R4GV
Seats before	3 (6)	2 (4)	2 (4)
Seats won	2	1	1
Seat change	▼4	▼3	▼3
Popular vote	8,470	13,684	3,221
Percentage	1.96%	3.16%	0.74%
	Seventh party	Eighth party	Ninth party
Party	RIRG	Green	Labour
Seats before	0	0	2 (4)
Seats won	1	0	0
Seat change	▲1	Steady	▼4
Popular vote	2,061	37,611	13,466
Percentage	0.48%	8.69%	3.11%
- Map of wards coloured by party won.

- Composition of the council following the election
Leader after election
Paul Follows
Liberal Democrats

The 2026 West Surrey Council election took place on 7 May 2026, electing members of the new West Surrey Council in Surrey, England. This was on the same day as other local elections.

This was the inaugural election to West Surrey Council, following its creation from the merger of Guildford, Runnymede, Spelthorne, Surrey Heath, Waverley, and Woking, along with the coterminus area of Surrey County Council following its confirmed abolition. The council will initially operate as a "shadow authority", with the transition to the council's full powers on 1 April 2027.

90 seats, from 45 two-member wards, were contested at the election, a sharp reduction in the number of councillors covering the West Surrey area (287 pre-reorganisation (Note: District, borough, and county councillors.) vs. 90 post-reorganisation, a reduction of 67%). The ward boundaries used were the revised Surrey County Council boundaries for the cancelled 2025 elections.

The Liberal Democrats won a majority at this election, taking 56 of the 90 seats. After the election, they chose Paul Follows, leader of Waverley Borough Council, to be their group leader. He was formally confirmed as leader of the shadow authority at its inaugural meeting in Guildford on 21 May 2026.

== Background ==
This election was the first to the planned authority of West Surrey Council, which will now operate as a "shadow" authority until 2027.

The Conservative Party won a majority of seats at the 2021 Surrey County Council election. Of the County Council seats in West Surrey, in 2021 the Conservatives won 25, the Liberal Democrats won 11, residents’ groups and independent candidates won 7, and the Labour Party won 2.

With two councillors being elected for West Surrey in 2026 in each of the equivalent 45 Surrey Council electoral wards (as revised by a recent local government boundary review), the 2021 totals should effectively be doubled for comparison’s sake. ie. in 2021 the Conservatives can be estimated to have won 50 seats in West Surrey, the LibDems 22, Residents and Independents 14, and Labour 4.

(The Liberal Democrats hold a majority in three of the six district councils that make up the area of the West Surrey unitary authority, with the other three councils currently being under no overall control. These six district authorities will be abolished on 1 April 2027).

2021 Surrey County Council Result in West Surrey Divisions
Party	Seats	Votes	%
Conservative	25	77,184	42.2
Liberal Democrats	11	47,059	25.7
Residents	5	17,046	9.3
Labour	2	21,859	11.9
Independent	2	10,020	5.5
Green	0	8,012	4.4
Heritage	0	541	0.3
UKIP	0	441	0.2
Reform UK	0	291	0.2
TUSC	0	255	0.1
Peace Party	0	140	0.1
Workers Party	0	86	0.1
Total	45	182,934	

== Opinion polling ==
Pollster	Date(s) conducted	Sample size	Con	Lab	Lib Dem	Green	Reform	Ind/Other	Lead
2025 election	7 May 2026	–	24.90%	3.09%	35.68%	8.63%	20.62%	3.14%	11
JL Partners (MRP)	31 March – 13 April 2026	4,089 (England)	24.0%	6.6%	32.1%	8.3%	25.1%	3.9%	7

== Results overview ==
Seats won (outer ring) versus total number of votes (inner ring) Liberal Democrats Conservative Party Reform UK Independent Green Labour Party

Party	Councillors				Votes	
Party	Candidates	Elected	%	Change (Note: Notional changes from the 2021 Surrey County Council election, as reported by the BBC)		%
Liberal Democrats	90	56	62.2%	▲34	155,500	35.92%
Conservative Party	90	20	22.2%	▼30	108,519	25.07%
Reform UK	90	9	10.0%	▲9	89,866	20.76%
Farnham Residents	6	2	2.2%	▼4	8,470	1.96%
Independent	22	1	1.1%	▼3	13,684	3.16%
R4GV	2	1	1.1%	▼3	3,221	0.74%
RIRG	2	1	1.1%	▲1	2,061	0.48%
Green Party	78	0	0%	Steady	37,611	8.69%
Labour Party (Note: Includes Labour Co-op.)	65	0	0%	▼4	13,466	3.11%
Heritage Party	3	0	0%	Steady	236	0.05%
Peace Party	1	0	0%	Steady	100	0.02%
TUSC	3	0	0%	Steady	90	0.02%
Monster Raving Loony Party	1	0	0%	Steady	87	0.02%

The Liberal Democrats secured a comfortable overall majority on the new council. The Liberal Democrats came out of the election with a majority of 36 seats over the second-placed Conservatives, and of 22 seats over all the other parties on the council (including Residents/Independents) combined.

The Liberal Democrats won 56 seats, the Conservatives won 20 seats, Reform won 9 seats, Residents' Groups won 4 seats and 1 independent candidate was elected. No Labour Party or Green Party candidates won a seat.

After the election, the Liberal Democrats formed a majority administration and elected Cllr Paul Follows as Leader of their Group and as the Leader of the new Council. The Conservative Group became the official opposition on the Council and chose Cllr Jane Austin (concurrently the Leader of the Opposition on Waverley Borough Council) to be their Leader.

== Results by ward ==
=== Guildford ===
Ash (2 seats)
Party	Candidate	Votes	%	±%
Liberal Democrats	Carla Morson	2,088	40.8	
Liberal Democrats	Phil Bellamy	1,805	35.2	
Conservative	John Tonks	1,422	27.8	
Reform	Patrick Kelley	1,204	23.5	
Reform	Laurence Hodge	1,178	23.0	
Conservative	Andrew Bolton	1,005	19.6	
Green	Freya Grondinger	483	9.4	
Green	Josh Sharum-Smith	287	5.6	
Independent	Nigel Manning	243	4.7	
Labour	Lewis Jewell	221	4.3	
Registered electors		12,401		
Turnout		5,123	41.3	
Rejected ballots		24	0.5	
Liberal Democrats hold		Swing		
Liberal Democrats hold		Swing		

Guildford East (2 seats)
Party	Candidate	Votes	%	±%
Liberal Democrats	George Potter	2,818	52.2	
Liberal Democrats	Jo Shaw	2,541	47.1	
Conservative	David Humphries	1,243	23.0	
Conservative	Adam Heilbron	1,154	21.4	
Reform	Robert Abrams	817	15.1	
Reform	Dennis Paul	782	14.5	
Green	Lisa McKeown	490	9.1	
Green	Luis MacHado	446	8.3	
Labour	Moira Noble	234	4.3	
Registered electors		11,134		
Turnout		5,400	48.5	
Rejected ballots		26	0.5	
Liberal Democrats hold		Swing		
Liberal Democrats hold		Swing		

Guildford North (2 seats)
Party	Candidate	Votes	%	±%
Liberal Democrats	Katie Steel	1,696	41.6	
Liberal Democrats	Masuk Miah	1,590	39.0	
Reform	Ben Bispham	909	22.3	
Reform	Aidan Sallis	813	20.0	
Green	Marco Crosta	727	17.8	
Green	Stuart McAlpine	620	15.2	
Conservative	Adrian Chandler	596	14.6	
Conservative	Neil O'Brien	528	13.0	
Labour Co-op	Anne Rouse	332	8.1	
Registered electors		10,435		
Turnout		4,075	39.1	
Rejected ballots		20	0.5	
Liberal Democrats hold		Swing		
Liberal Democrats hold		Swing		

Guildford South East (2 seats)
Party	Candidate	Votes	%	±%
Liberal Democrats	Vanessa King	2,325	47.0	
Liberal Democrats	James Thornton	2,236	45.2	
Conservative	Thom Van Every	1,394	28.2	
Conservative	Alex Fiuza	1,336	27.0	
Green	Charlie Parker	579	11.7	
Reform	Veronica Hurst	533	10.8	
Green	Matt Price	496	10.0	
Reform	Claire Partridge-Waymouth	460	9.3	
Labour	Sean Sussex	166	3.4	
Independent	Tim Wolfenden	126	2.5	
Registered electors		10,523		
Turnout		4,948	47.0	
Rejected ballots		12	0.2	
Liberal Democrats gain from R4GV		Swing		
Liberal Democrats gain from R4GV		Swing		

Guildford South West (2 seats)
Party	Candidate	Votes	%	±%
Liberal Democrats	Angela Goodwin	2,595	55.2	
Liberal Democrats	Steve Hives	1,989	42.3	
Green	Claire Whitehouse	1,157	24.6	
Green	Matt Fray	983	20.9	
Conservative	Honor Brooker	649	13.8	
Conservative	Andre Hester	562	12.0	
Reform	Charles Whiting	491	10.5	
Reform	John Le Cheminant	485	10.3	
Labour	Vlad Stoiana-Mois	200	4.3	
Registered electors		10,445		
Turnout		4,698	45.0	
Rejected ballots		20	0.4	
Liberal Democrats hold		Swing		
Liberal Democrats hold		Swing		

Guildford West (2 seats)
Party	Candidate	Votes	%	±%
Liberal Democrats	Julia McShane	1,534	42.1	
Liberal Democrats	James Steel	1,227	33.7	
Reform	Sophie Evans	801	22.0	
Reform	Dale Layman	792	21.7	
Green	Jack Whitehouse	788	21.6	
Green	Jack Mountford	686	18.8	
Conservative	Christopher Jay	414	11.4	
Labour	Howard Smith	407	11.2	
Conservative	Malachy Ujam	294	8.1	
Peace	John Morris	100	2.7	
Registered electors		10,270		
Turnout		3,645	35.5	
Rejected ballots		14	0.4	
Liberal Democrats hold		Swing		
Liberal Democrats hold		Swing		

Horsleys (2 seats)
Party	Candidate	Votes	%	±%
R4GV	Catherine Young	1,845	34.2	
Conservative	David Evans	1,446	26.8	
Conservative	Sam Tough	1,415	26.3	
R4GV	Dennis Booth	1,376	25.5	
Liberal Democrats	Merel Rehorst-Smith	1,181	21.9	
Liberal Democrats	Olly Kekwick	952	17.7	
Reform	Martin Sargeant	915	17.0	
Reform	Henry Walter	744	13.8	
Green	Elena Daniilidou	306	5.7	
Green	Isaac Short	226	4.2	
Labour	John Barnes	138	2.6	
Registered electors		10,235		
Turnout		5,389	52.7	
Rejected ballots		10	0.2	
R4GV hold		Swing		
Conservative gain from R4GV		Swing		

Shalford (2 seats)
Party	Candidate	Votes	%	±%
Conservative	Matt Furniss	2,062	42.1	
Conservative	Sallie Barker	1,889	38.6	
Liberal Democrats	Stephen Mallet	1,375	28.1	
Liberal Democrats	Dominique Williams	1,364	27.9	
Reform	Neil Crossley	933	19.1	
Reform	Gary Jackson	878	17.9	
Green	Adrian Barbrooke	443	9.0	
Green	Christopher Wade	381	7.8	
Labour	Peter Lockhart	161	3.3	
Registered electors		10,332		
Turnout		4,897	47.4	
Rejected ballots		14	0.3	
Conservative hold		Swing		
Conservative hold		Swing		

Shere (2 seats)
Party	Candidate	Votes	%	±%
Conservative	Robert Hughes	2,297	44.1	
Conservative	Victoria Sena	2,130	40.9	
Liberal Democrats	Jane Tyson	1,308	25.1	
Liberal Democrats	James Markey	1,294	24.9	
Reform	Chris Jellard	1,067	20.5	
Reform	Denis Podany	953	18.3	
Green	Cynthia Page	463	8.9	
Green	Martyn Turner	378	7.3	
Labour Co-op	James Muller	174	3.3	
Registered electors		10,412		
Turnout		5,206	50.0	
Rejected ballots		15	0.3	
Conservative hold		Swing		
Conservative hold		Swing		

Worplesdon (2 seats)
Party	Candidate	Votes	%	±%
Conservative	Bilal Akhtar	1,775	36.7	
Conservative	Jonathan Lord	1,705	35.2	
Liberal Democrats	Matt Felgate	1,458	30.1	
Liberal Democrats	Jason Martin	1,234	25.5	
Reform	Andrew Berry	1,087	22.5	
Reform	Kate Broadhurst	1,062	22.0	
Green	Alex McElduff	456	9.4	
Green	Jayden Sarma	401	8.3	
Labour	Brian Creese	196	4.1	
Registered electors		10,401		
Turnout		4,837	46.5	
Rejected ballots		15	0.3	
Conservative hold		Swing		
Conservative hold		Swing		

=== Runnymede ===
Addlestone (2 seats)
Party	Candidate	Votes	%	±%
Reform	Scott Kelly	1,254	32.1	
Reform	Vinny Mitchell	1,195	30.6	
Conservative	George Callaghan	962	24.6	
Conservative	Marilyn Swinney	864	22.1	
Green	Paul Richens	820	21.0	
Green	Tobin Steele	693	17.7	
Liberal Democrats	Jenny Coulon	617	15.8	
Liberal Democrats	Stuart Lawrence	547	14.0	
Labour Co-op	Arran Neathy	281	7.2	
Labour Co-op	Elaine Percival	265	6.8	
Invalid or blank votes		14	0.4	
Registered electors		10,080		
Turnout		3,910	38.8	
Reform gain from Conservative		Swing		
Reform gain from Conservative		Swing		

Chertsey (2 seats)
Party	Candidate	Votes	%	±%
Conservative	Mark Nuti	1,717	40.1	
Conservative	Shannon Saise-Marshall	1,303	30.5	
Reform	Dan Caruso	1,174	27.4	
Reform	Sam Newman	1,168	27.3	
Liberal Democrats	Kevin Lee	585	13.7	
Green	Julie Gibbs	512	12.0	
Liberal Democrats	Richard Grills	472	11.0	
Labour	Helen Ryder-Smith	464	10.8	
Green	Matthew Axbey	460	10.8	
Labour	Bernie Stacey	377	8.8	
Invalid or blank votes		7	0.2	
Registered electors		10,234		
Turnout		4,277	41.8	
Conservative hold		Swing		
Conservative hold		Swing		

Egham (2 seats)
Party	Candidate	Votes	%	±%
RIRG	Isabel Mullens	1,113	26.6	
Reform	George Gladstone-New	1,014	24.2	
RIRG	Gren Elliot	948	22.6	
Reform	Lewis Kitt	831	19.8	
Labour Co-op	Jack Nayak	709	16.9	
Green	Danni Batt	701	16.7	
Labour Co-op	Cai Parry	676	16.1	
Conservative	Rahul Joglekar	663	15.8	
Conservative	John Osborn	648	15.5	
Liberal Democrats	Ian Heath	265	6.3	
Liberal Democrats	Annabel Jones	204	4.9	
Independent	Damien Biggs	188	4.5	
Invalid or blank votes		9	0.2	
Registered electors		9,655		
Turnout		4,190	43.4	
RIRG gain from Labour Co-op		Swing		
Reform gain from Labour Co-op		Swing		

Englefield Green & Virginia Water (2 seats)
Party	Candidate	Votes	%	±%
Conservative	Marisa Heath	1,858	45.4	
Conservative	Chris Howorth	1,683	41.1	
Liberal Democrats	Karin Rowsell	1,146	28.0	
Liberal Democrats	Guy Russo	752	18.4	
Reform	Graham Kimber	638	15.6	
Reform	Geoff Read	525	12.8	
Green	Rosalie Turner	357	8.7	
Green	Tom Lagden	354	8.6	
Labour Co-op	Abby King	287	7.0	
Labour Co-op	Paul Gahir	188	4.6	
Registered electors		9,302		
Turnout		4,097	44.0	
Rejected ballots		18	0.4	
Conservative hold		Swing		
Conservative hold		Swing		

Thorpe, Longcross & Ottershaw (2 seats)
Party	Candidate	Votes	%	±%
Reform	Carl Mann	1,729	32.4	
Conservative	Jonathan Hulley	1,623	30.4	
Reform	Miles Morris	1,416	26.6	
Conservative	Roberto Buono	1,403	26.3	
Liberal Democrats	Don Whyte	1,380	25.9	
Liberal Democrats	Sylvia Whyte	1,343	25.2	
Independent	Michael Cressey	426	8.0	
Green	Zoe Smith	347	6.5	
Green	John Kelly	315	5.9	
Labour	Jocelyn Boxall	231	4.3	
Labour	Ben Niblett	161	3.0	
Invalid or blank votes		20	0.4	
Registered electors		11,424		
Turnout		5,332	46.7	
Reform gain from Conservative		Swing		
Conservative hold		Swing		

Woodham & New Haw (2 seats)
Party	Candidate	Votes	%	±%
Conservative	Scott Lewis	2,212	41.5	
Conservative	Josh Brown	1,792	33.7	
Liberal Democrats	Ronan McCaughey	1,718	32.3	
Liberal Democrats	Chelsea Whyte	1,498	28.1	
Reform	Ian Betteridge	1,151	21.6	
Reform	Paul Dimarco	971	18.2	
Green	Martin Robson	422	7.9	
Labour	Martina Hunter	186	3.5	
Labour	Ricky Milstead	163	3.1	
Invalid or blank votes		4	0.1	
Turnout		5,325	48.7	
Registered electors		10,938		
Conservative hold		Swing		
Conservative hold		Swing		

=== Spelthorne ===
Ashford (2 seats)
Party	Candidate	Votes	%	±%
Independent	Joanne Sexton	1,870	36.3	
Reform	Richard Barratt	1,465	28.4	
Reform	Chris Beresford	1,435	27.9	
Independent	Sean Freeman	1,209	23.5	
Conservative	Rose Chandler	849	16.5	
Conservative	Paul Woodward	839	16.3	
Liberal Democrats	Manu Singh	628	12.2	
Liberal Democrats	Satpal Thethy	561	10.9	
Green	Peter Hughes	474	9.2	
Labour	Mark Appleyard	375	7.3	
Labour	Sharon Linsell	319	6.2	
Registered electors		11,427		
Turnout		5,151	45.1	
Rejected ballots		10	0.2	
Independent hold		Swing		
Reform gain from Independent		Swing		

Laleham & Shepperton (2 seats)
Party	Candidate	Votes	%	±%
Conservative	Maureen Attewell	2,702	49.3	
Conservative	Sinead Mooney	2,046	37.3	
Reform	Jason Gelver	1,520	27.7	
Reform	Amar Brar	1,293	23.6	
Green	Stuart Whitmore	764	13.9	
Green	Steve Ringham	688	12.6	
Liberal Democrats	Matt Lindon	622	11.3	
Liberal Democrats	Michael Alexiou	584	10.7	
Labour	William Kerr	273	5.0	
Labour	Kiri Kankhwende	239	4.4	
Registered electors		10,252		
Turnout		5,482	53.5	
Rejected ballots		9	0.2	
Conservative hold		Swing		
Conservative hold		Swing		

Lower Sunbury & Halliford (2 seats)
Party	Candidate	Votes	%	±%
Liberal Democrats	Richard Herman	1,731	33.4	
Liberal Democrats	Paul Vanni	1,682	32.4	
Conservative	Buddhi Weerasinghe	1,586	30.6	
Conservative	Matthew Lee	1,581	30.5	
Reform	Daniel Holland	1,291	24.9	
Reform	Ritu Parihar	1,054	20.3	
Green	Simon Appleby	388	7.5	
Green	Asbjorn Appleby	360	6.9	
Labour	Gerald Dare	251	4.8	
Labour	Costas Loizou	199	3.8	
Registered electors		10,767		
Turnout		5,186	48.2	
Rejected ballots		13	0.3	
Liberal Democrats gain from Conservative		Swing		
Liberal Democrats gain from Conservative		Swing		

Staines (2 seats)
Party	Candidate	Votes	%	±%
Liberal Democrats	Laura Barker	1,989	39.5	
Liberal Democrats	Chris Bateson	1,641	32.6	
Reform	Stuart Boyle	1,200	23.8	
Reform	Jean-Marc Peter France	1,052	20.9	
Conservative	Denise Saliagopoulos	924	18.3	
Conservative	John Boughtflower	818	16.2	
Independent	Howard Williams	661	13.1	
Green	Steven Goatman	466	9.2	
Green	Darren Bernard	464	9.2	
Labour	Loukas Christou	276	5.5	
Labour	Ian Gordon Jenkins	250	5.0	
Monster Raving Loony	Miss Applied Malarkey	87	1.7	
Registered electors		11,413		
Turnout		5,040	44.2	
Rejected ballots		3	0.1	
Liberal Democrats gain from Conservative		Swing		
Liberal Democrats gain from Conservative		Swing		

Staines South & Ashford West (2 seats)
Party	Candidate	Votes	%	±%
Reform	Phil Basey	1,481	30.0	
Liberal Democrats	Harleen Boparai	1,448	29.3	
Reform	Ian Brooks	1,428	28.9	
Liberal Democrats	Cara Mackley	1,360	27.5	
Conservative	Denise Turner-Stewart	1,176	23.8	
Conservative	Darren Clarke	1,062	21.5	
Green	Andrea Short	417	8.4	
Labour	Tony Burrell	361	7.3	
Independent	Philip Baldock	330	6.7	
Labour	Jared Kidd	281	5.7	
Independent	Ali Lee	277	5.6	
Registered electors		10,779		
Turnout		4,937	45.8	
Rejected ballots		6	0.1	
Reform gain from Conservative		Swing		
Liberal Democrats gain from Conservative		Swing		

Stanwell, Stanwell Moor & Ashford North (2 seats)
Party	Candidate	Votes	%	±%
Reform	Jim McIlroy	1,478	38.7	
Reform	Harry Phillips	1,427	37.4	
Conservative	Med Buck	976	25.6	
Conservative	Karen Howkins	773	20.2	
Labour	Sean Beatty	752	19.7	
Labour	Rebecca Geach	703	18.4	
Green	Arshid Bashir	428	11.2	
Green	Helen Laws	385	10.1	
Liberal Democrats	Gerald Gravett	213	5.6	
Liberal Democrats	Malgorzata Kut	178	4.7	
Registered electors		10,708		
Turnout		3,818	35.7	
Rejected ballots		13	0.3	
Reform gain from Labour		Swing		
Reform gain from Labour		Swing		

Sunbury Common & Ashford Common (2 seats)
Party	Candidate	Votes	%	±%
Liberal Democrats	Harry Boparai	1,896	40.9	
Reform	Rory O'Brien	1,428	30.8	
Liberal Democrats	Suraj Gyawali	1,352	29.2	
Reform	Anil Khedkar	1,217	26.2	
Conservative	Simon Bhadye	746	16.1	
Conservative	Naz Islam	534	11.5	
Green	Emma Jones	463	10.0	
Independent	Mary Bing Dong	407	8.8	
Labour	Mark Kluth	290	6.3	
Independent	Jacqueline Stanton	284	6.1	
Labour	Akash Ruparelia	222	4.8	
TUSC	Helen Couchman	35	0.8	
TUSC	Paul Couchman	30	0.6	
Registered electors		11,640		
Turnout		4,638	39.8	
Rejected ballots		8	0.2	
Liberal Democrats gain from Conservative		Swing		
Reform gain from Conservative		Swing		

=== Surrey Heath ===
Bagshot, Windlesham & Chobham (2 seats)
Party	Candidate	Votes	%	±%
Liberal Democrats	Simon Browne	2,105	40.5	
Liberal Democrats	Richard Wilson*	2,097	40.4	
Reform	Richard Barker	1,397	26.9	
Conservative	Valerie White*	1,383	26.6	
Conservative	Catherine Gomme	1,217	23.4	
Reform	Steed Hayllar-Bennett	1,201	23.1	
Green	Emma-Laura James	275	5.3	
Green	Laura Mae Perkins	208	4.0	
Labour	Matthew Clarke	84	1.6	
Labour	Archie Langdon	73	1.4	
Registered electors		11,434		
Turnout		5,195	45.4	
Rejected ballots		9	0.2	
Liberal Democrats gain from Conservative		Swing		
Liberal Democrats gain from Conservative		Swing		

Richard Wilson is a sitting parish and borough councillor, Valerie White is a sitting parish councillor.

Camberley East (2 seats)
Party	Candidate	Votes	%	±%
Liberal Democrats	Jamie Calder	1,880	37.7	
Liberal Democrats	Ying Perrett	1,604	32.1	
Conservative	Trefor Hogg*	1,593	31.9	
Conservative	Shaun Garrett*	1,461	29.3	
Reform	Anatoly Belnik	1,185	23.7	
Reform	Sam Goggin	1,159	23.2	
Green	Becky-Lulu Dartnell	354	7.1	
Green	Jack Rice	267	5.3	
Labour	Christopher Jarvis	138	2.8	
Labour	Simon Schofield	100	2.0	
Registered electors		12,037		
Turnout		4,991	41.5	
Rejected ballots		8	0.2	
Liberal Democrats gain from Conservative		Swing		
Liberal Democrats gain from Conservative		Swing		

Trefor Hogg is a sitting county councillor, Shaun Garrett is a sitting borough councillor.

Camberley West & Frimley (2 seats)
Party	Candidate	Votes	%	±%
Liberal Democrats	Alan Ashbery	1,824	47.0	
Liberal Democrats	Sarbie Kang	1,599	41.2	
Reform	Colin Montague	1,084	27.9	
Reform	Darryl Ratiram	962	24.8	
Conservative	Toni Hourahane	530	13.7	
Conservative	Adisa-Maria Manole	463	11.9	
Green	Linda Allard	390	10.1	
Green	Gary Marsh	279	7.2	
Labour	Mackenzie Bird	161	4.1	
Labour	Charlotte Viola	102	2.6	
Registered electors		10,305		
Turnout		3,880	37.7	
Rejected ballots		6	0.2	
Liberal Democrats gain from Conservative		Swing		
Liberal Democrats gain from Conservative		Swing		

Alan Ashbery is a sitting county and borough councillor, Sarbie Kang is a sitting borough councillor.

Frimley Green & Mytchett (2 seats)
Party	Candidate	Votes	%	±%
Conservative	Paul Deach*	2,027	37.9	
Liberal Democrats	Jacques Olmo*	1,911	35.8	
Liberal Democrats	Morgan Rise*	1,669	31.2	
Conservative	Attieh Fard	1,437	26.9	
Reform	Will Lyons	1,295	24.2	
Reform	Ron Whitcher	1,261	23.6	
Green	Tahir Ahmad	313	5.9	
Green	Charlie Wilson	273	5.1	
Labour	Harry Hurst	86	1.6	
Labour	Indiannah Hilson-Gregory	84	1.6	
Registered electors		11,180		
Turnout		5,345	47.8	
Rejected ballots		8	0.1	
Conservative hold		Swing		
Liberal Democrats gain from Conservative		Swing		

Paul Deach is a sitting County Councillor, Jacques Olmo is a sitting borough councillor, Morgan Rise is a sitting borough councillor.

Heatherside & Parkside (2 seats)
Party	Candidate	Votes	%	±%
Liberal Democrats	Rob Lee*	2,912	50.1	
Liberal Democrats	Dr Nirmal Kang*	2,791	48.0	
Reform	Matt Davies	1,565	26.9	
Reform	Max Nelson	1,251	21.5	
Conservative	Neeraj Shah	847	14.6	
Conservative	Leo Pargeter	749	12.9	
Green	John Skipper*	649	11.2	
Green	Bill Dixon	369	6.3	
Labour	Massimo Ferrara	104	1.8	
Registered electors		11,727		
Turnout		5,817	49.6	
Rejected ballots		10	0.2	
Liberal Democrats gain from Conservative		Swing		
Liberal Democrats gain from Conservative		Swing		

Rob Lee, Dr Nirmal Kang and John Skipper are sitting borough councillors.

Lightwater, West End & Bisley (2 seats)
Party	Candidate	Votes	%	±%
Liberal Democrats	Julie Hoad*	2,656	45.4	
Liberal Democrats	Shaun Macdonald*	2,270	38.8	
Reform	Peter Appleford	1,462	25.0	
Conservative	Rebecca Jennings-Evans*	1,269	21.7	
Conservative	Tony Henderson*	1,224	20.9	
Reform	Malcolm Newbury	1,206	20.6	
Independent	Graham Alleway*	288	4.9	
Green	Sopha Hodgson	288	4.9	
Green	Ian Gibbs	282	4.8	
Independent	Adrian Page*	177	3.0	
Labour	Richard Claridge	128	2.2	
Independent	Wendy Evans	96	1.6	
Registered electors		12,232		
Turnout		5,844	47.8	
Rejected ballots		3	0.1	
Liberal Democrats gain from Conservative		Swing		
Liberal Democrats gain from Conservative		Swing		

Julie Hoad and Shaun Macdonald are sitting borough councillors. Rebecca Jennings-Evans is a sitting County and Parish councillor. Tony Henderson, Graham Alleway and Adrian Page are sitting Parish councillors.

=== Waverley ===
Cranleigh & Ewhurst (2 seats)
Party	Candidate	Votes	%	±%
Liberal Democrats	Liz Townsend	3,440	52.8	
Liberal Democrats	Brian Steel	2,681	41.2	
Conservative	Sean Donovan-Smith	1,590	24.4	
Conservative	Philip Brooker	1,540	23.6	
Reform	Diane James	1,288	19.8	
Reform	Ian Hemmingway	1,274	19.6	
Green	Samantha Young	329	5.0	
Green	Rafael Fischer	318	4.9	
Labour	James Mitchell	159	2.4	
Registered electors		12,420		
Turnout		6,515	52.5	
Rejected ballots		14	0.2	
Liberal Democrats hold		Swing		
Liberal Democrats hold		Swing		

Farnham Central (2 seats)
Party	Candidate	Votes	%	±%
Liberal Democrats	Tony Fairclough	1,710	34.7	
Liberal Democrats	Richard Steijger	1,509	30.6	
Farnham Residents	Andrew Macleod	1,295	26.3	
Farnham Residents	David Bearman	1,237	25.1	
Conservative	Patrick Stephens	747	15.2	
Reform	Sandra Johnson	714	14.5	
Conservative	Chris Storey	654	13.3	
Reform	Timothy Visser	630	12.8	
Green	Lewis Richardson	514	10.4	
Green	Robert Ellis	500	10.2	
Labour	John Gaskell	172	3.5	
Registered electors		10,882		
Turnout		4,924	45.2	
Rejected ballots		14	0.3	
Liberal Democrats gain from Farnham Residents		Swing		
Liberal Democrats gain from Farnham Residents		Swing		

Farnham North (2 seats)
Party	Candidate	Votes	%	±%
Farnham Residents	Catherine Powell	1,987	42.1	
Farnham Residents	Sally Dickson	1,690	35.8	
Reform	Ed Cowley	1,037	22.0	
Reform	James Macey	958	20.3	
Liberal Democrats	Mat Brown	854	18.1	
Conservative	Pat Frost	540	11.4	
Green	Chris Brooks	510	10.8	
Green	Natasha Fletcher	500	10.6	
Liberal Democrats	Matthew Simon	498	10.6	
Conservative	Joseph Kay	427	9.1	
Labour	Howard Kaye	220	4.7	
TUSC	Huw James	25	0.5	
Registered electors		10,519		
Turnout		4,718	44.9	
Rejected ballots		8	0.2	
Farnham Residents hold		Swing		
Farnham Residents hold		Swing		

Farnham South (2 seats)
Party	Candidate	Votes	%	±%
Liberal Democrats	Ben Bristow	1,492	30.7	
Liberal Democrats	Sally Shorthose	1,305	26.9	
Farnham Residents	George Murray	1,197	24.6	
Conservative	Paul Stiff	1,103	22.7	
Conservative	Tam Traynor	1,072	22.1	
Farnham Residents	Michaela Martin	1,064	21.9	
Reform	Dean Boyce	694	14.3	
Reform	Christine Fisher	570	11.7	
Green	David Baines	417	8.6	
Green	George Wilson	269	5.5	
Independent	Mark Westcott	172	3.5	
Labour	Sam Pritchard	156	3.2	
Registered electors		10,180		
Turnout		4,858	47.7	
Rejected ballots		10	0.2	
Liberal Democrats gain from Farnham Residents		Swing		
Liberal Democrats gain from Farnham Residents		Swing		

Godalming North (2 seats)
Party	Candidate	Votes	%	±%
Liberal Democrats	Penny Rivers	2,818	47.6	
Liberal Democrats	Ruth Thompson	2,291	38.7	
Conservative	Ed Holliday	1,608	27.2	
Conservative	Daniel Husseini	1,443	24.4	
Green	David Faraday	1,001	16.9	
Green	Steve Williams	968	16.3	
Reform	Jon Davies	701	11.8	
Reform	George Devereux	672	11.3	
Labour	John Stolliday	143	2.4	
Registered electors		11,420		
Turnout		5,921	51.8	
Rejected ballots		28	0.5	
Liberal Democrats hold		Swing		
Liberal Democrats hold		Swing		

Godalming South, Milford & Witley (2 seats)
Party	Candidate	Votes	%	±%
Liberal Democrats	Paul Follows	2,809	47.3	
Liberal Democrats	Victoria Kiehl	2,287	38.5	
Conservative	John Hemmings	1,503	25.3	
Conservative	Ian Lewer	1,313	22.1	
Independent	Maxine Gale	1,155	19.4	
Reform	Alex Roebuck	666	11.2	
Reform	Alfie Treasure	548	9.2	
Green	Joey Ashworth	531	8.9	
Independent	Steve Dally	382	6.4	
Green	Morgan Thrift	298	5.0	
Labour	Daphne Balde	114	1.9	
Registered electors		11,002		
Turnout		5,940	54.0	
Rejected ballots		14	0.2	
Liberal Democrats hold		Swing		
Liberal Democrats hold		Swing		

Haslemere (2 seats)
Party	Candidate	Votes	%	±%
Liberal Democrats	Oli Leach	2,441	48.7	
Liberal Democrats	Terry Weldon	1,814	36.2	
Conservative	Toby Byfield	1,214	24.2	
Conservative	Graham Betts	1,177	23.5	
Reform	Jonathan Ashworth	857	17.1	
Green	Claire Matthes	803	16.0	
Reform	Barb Witt	735	14.7	
Green	Alistair Bayliss	638	12.7	
Labour	Alex Howey	115	2.3	
Registered electors		9,956		
Turnout		5,010	50.3	
Rejected ballots		10	0.2	
Liberal Democrats hold		Swing		
Liberal Democrats hold		Swing		

Waverley Eastern Villages (2 seats)
Party	Candidate	Votes	%	±%
Conservative	Jane Austin	3,359	56.1	
Conservative	Kevin Deanus	2,893	48.4	
Liberal Democrats	Dave Busby	1,696	28.3	
Liberal Democrats	Paul Wright	1,488	24.9	
Reform	Graham Ellwood	703	11.7	
Reform	Dominique Crapart	666	11.1	
Green	Ingrid Curnock	342	5.7	
Green	Martin D'Arcy	295	4.9	
Labour	Sarah Davey	130	2.2	
Registered electors		11,171		
Turnout		5,983	53.6	
Rejected ballots		18	0.3	
Conservative hold		Swing		
Conservative hold		Swing		

Waverley Western Villages (2 seats)
Party	Candidate	Votes	%	±%
Conservative	Pheobe Sullivan	1,961	35.3	
Liberal Democrats	Keith Buchanan	1,941	35.0	
Liberal Democrats	Mark Merryweather	1,853	33.4	
Conservative	Jean Arrick	1,815	32.7	
Independent	David Munro	990	17.8	
Reform	Ged Hall	829	14.9	
Reform	Christopher Olive	644	11.6	
Green	Clare Weightman	329	5.9	
Green	Simon Lightman	310	5.6	
Labour	Andrew Jones	108	1.9	
Registered electors		10,428		
Turnout		5,552	53.2	
Rejected ballots		8	0.1	
Conservative hold		Swing		
Liberal Democrats gain from Conservative		Swing		

=== Woking ===
Goldsworth East & Horsell Village (2 seats)
Party	Candidate	Votes	%	±%
Liberal Democrats	John Morley	3,029	60.4	
Liberal Democrats	Lance Spencer	2,746	54.7	
Reform	Cheryl Bloomer	798	15.9	
Conservative	Jim Armitage	733	14.6	
Reform	Robert Lloyd	731	14.6	
Green	Christine Murphy	626	12.5	
Conservative	Martin Benstead	576	11.5	
Labour	Samar Chaudhary	219	4.4	
Labour	Usman Tahir	184	3.7	
Registered electors		10,841		
Turnout		5,019	46.3	
Rejected ballots		12	0.2	
Liberal Democrats hold		Swing		
Liberal Democrats hold		Swing		

Knaphill & Goldsworth West (2 seats)
Party	Candidate	Votes	%	±%
Liberal Democrats	Anne-Marie Barker	2,556	50.0	
Liberal Democrats	Steve Greentree	2,190	42.9	
Independent	Hassan Akberali	1,122	22.0	
Reform	Emma Mulder	1,039	20.3	
Reform	Carmel Ardrey	997	19.5	
Conservative	Debbie Harlow	713	14.0	
Green	Lewis Ashton	705	13.8	
Conservative	Abid Kayani	387	7.6	
Registered electors		11,798		
Turnout		5,108	43.3	
Rejected ballots		10	0.2	
Liberal Democrats gain from Conservative		Swing		
Liberal Democrats gain from Conservative		Swing		

The Byfleets (2 seats)
Party	Candidate	Votes	%	±%
Liberal Democrats	Liam Lyons	1,743	36.2	
Liberal Democrats	Ian Richardson	1,453	30.2	
Independent	Steve Howes	1,413	29.4	
Independent	Neil James Willetts	1,274	26.5	
Reform	Sean Flude	972	20.2	
Reform	Mark Hunter	945	19.6	
Conservative	Colin Kemp	546	11.3	
Conservative	Trevor Leek	490	10.2	
Labour	Oliver Lester	152	3.2	
Labour	Mohammed Sakhawat Khan	137	2.8	
Registered electors		10,663		
Turnout		4,813	45.1	
Rejected ballots		19	0.4	
Liberal Democrats gain from Independent		Swing		
Liberal Democrats gain from Independent		Swing		

Woking North (2 seats)
Party	Candidate	Votes	%	±%
Liberal Democrats	Attia Aslam	2,356	46.6	
Liberal Democrats	Zaf Rasab	2,222	43.9	
Labour	Tahir Aziz	981	19.4	
Labour	Anila Javaid	810	16.0	
Reform	Trevor Jones	731	14.5	
Conservative	Muzaffar Ali	658	13.0	
Reform	Jake Ventham	598	11.8	
Conservative	Shabana Sheikh	586	11.6	
Independent	Riasat Khan	574	11.3	
Heritage	Judith Squire	118	2.3	
Registered electors		11,124		
Turnout		5,058	45.5	
Rejected ballots		24	0.5	
Liberal Democrats gain from Conservative		Swing		
Liberal Democrats gain from Conservative		Swing		

Woking South (2 seats)
Party	Candidate	Votes	%	±%
Liberal Democrats	Ian Johnson	2,489	55.4	
Liberal Democrats	Louise Morales	2,480	55.2	
Reform	Alice Gurr	799	17.8	
Reform	John Petrie	741	16.5	
Green	Harrison Getz	600	13.3	
Green	Paul Hoekstra	570	12.7	
Conservative	John Lawrence	471	10.5	
Conservative	Colin Scott	403	9.0	
Heritage	Peter Squire	52	1.2	
Registered electors		10,618		
Turnout		4,495	42.3	
Rejected ballots		14	0.3	
Liberal Democrats hold		Swing		
Liberal Democrats hold		Swing		

Woking South East (2 seats)
Party	Candidate	Votes	%	±%
Liberal Democrats	Peter Graves	2,859	57.2	
Liberal Democrats	Ellen Nicholson	2,713	54.3	
Conservative	Steve Dorsett	913	18.3	
Reform	Stephen Aries	903	18.1	
Reform	Christopher Stone	785	15.7	
Conservative	Ben Maynard	782	15.6	
Green	Anastacia Shchybun	398	8.0	
Labour	Sabir Hussain	146	2.9	
Labour	Simona Popa	135	2.7	
Registered electors		10,358		
Turnout		5,000	48.3	
Rejected ballots		9	0.2	
Liberal Democrats gain from Conservative		Swing		
Liberal Democrats gain from Conservative		Swing		

Woking South West (2 seats)
Party	Candidate	Votes	%	±%
Liberal Democrats	Leslie Rice	2,820	50.2	
Liberal Democrats	Dale Roberts	2,588	46.1	
Conservative	Ayesha Azad	1,478	26.3	
Reform	Gavin Browning	1,024	18.2	
Conservative	Robert Kwiatkowski	954	17.0	
Reform	Charles Wilmot	852	15.2	
Green	Helen Kingstone	499	8.9	
Green	Mahil Vasanth	321	5.7	
Labour	Sean O'Malley	143	2.5	
Labour	Zamzam Ilyas	104	1.9	
Heritage	Tim Read	66	1.2	
Registered electors		11,397		
Turnout		5,616	49.3	
Rejected ballots		13	0.2	
Liberal Democrats gain from Conservative		Swing		
Liberal Democrats gain from Conservative		Swing		

== See also ==
- 2026 East Surrey Council election
- Surrey County Council elections
