= Runnymede Borough Council elections =

Local government elections in Surrey, England

One-third of Runnymede Borough Council in Surrey, England, was elected each year, followed by one year where there is an election to Surrey County Council instead. The council was divided into 14 wards, electing 41 councillors, since the last boundary changes in 2019. The council is due to be abolished on 1 April 2027 following structural changes to local government in Surrey.

== Council elections ==
- 1973 Runnymede District Council election
- 1976 Runnymede District Council election (New ward boundaries)
- 1978 Runnymede Borough Council election
- 1979 Runnymede Borough Council election (Borough boundary changes took place but the number of seats remained the same)
- 1980 Runnymede Borough Council election
- 1982 Runnymede Borough Council election
- 1983 Runnymede Borough Council election
- 1984 Runnymede Borough Council election
- 1986 Runnymede Borough Council election
- 1987 Runnymede Borough Council election
- 1988 Runnymede Borough Council election
- 1990 Runnymede Borough Council election
- 1991 Runnymede Borough Council election (Borough boundary changes took place but the number of seats remained the same)
- 1992 Runnymede Borough Council election
- 1994 Runnymede Borough Council election
- 1995 Runnymede Borough Council election
- 1996 Runnymede Borough Council election
- 1998 Runnymede Borough Council election (Borough boundary changes took place but the number of seats remained the same)
- 1999 Runnymede Borough Council election
- 2000 Runnymede Borough Council election (New ward boundaries)
- 2002 Runnymede Borough Council election
- 2003 Runnymede Borough Council election
- 2004 Runnymede Borough Council election
- 2006 Runnymede Borough Council election
- 2007 Runnymede Borough Council election
- 2008 Runnymede Borough Council election
- 2010 Runnymede Borough Council election
- 2011 Runnymede Borough Council election
- 2012 Runnymede Borough Council election
- 2014 Runnymede Borough Council election
- 2015 Runnymede Borough Council election
- 2016 Runnymede Borough Council election
- 2018 Runnymede Borough Council election
- 2019 Runnymede Borough Council election (New ward boundaries)
- 2021 Runnymede Borough Council election
- 2022 Runnymede Borough Council election
- 2023 Runnymede Borough Council election
- 2024 Runnymede Borough Council election

== Results maps ==
2002 results map

2003 results map

2004 results map

2006 results map

2007 results map

2008 results map

2010 results map

2011 results map

2012 results map

2014 results map

2015 results map

2016 results map

2018 results map

2019 results map

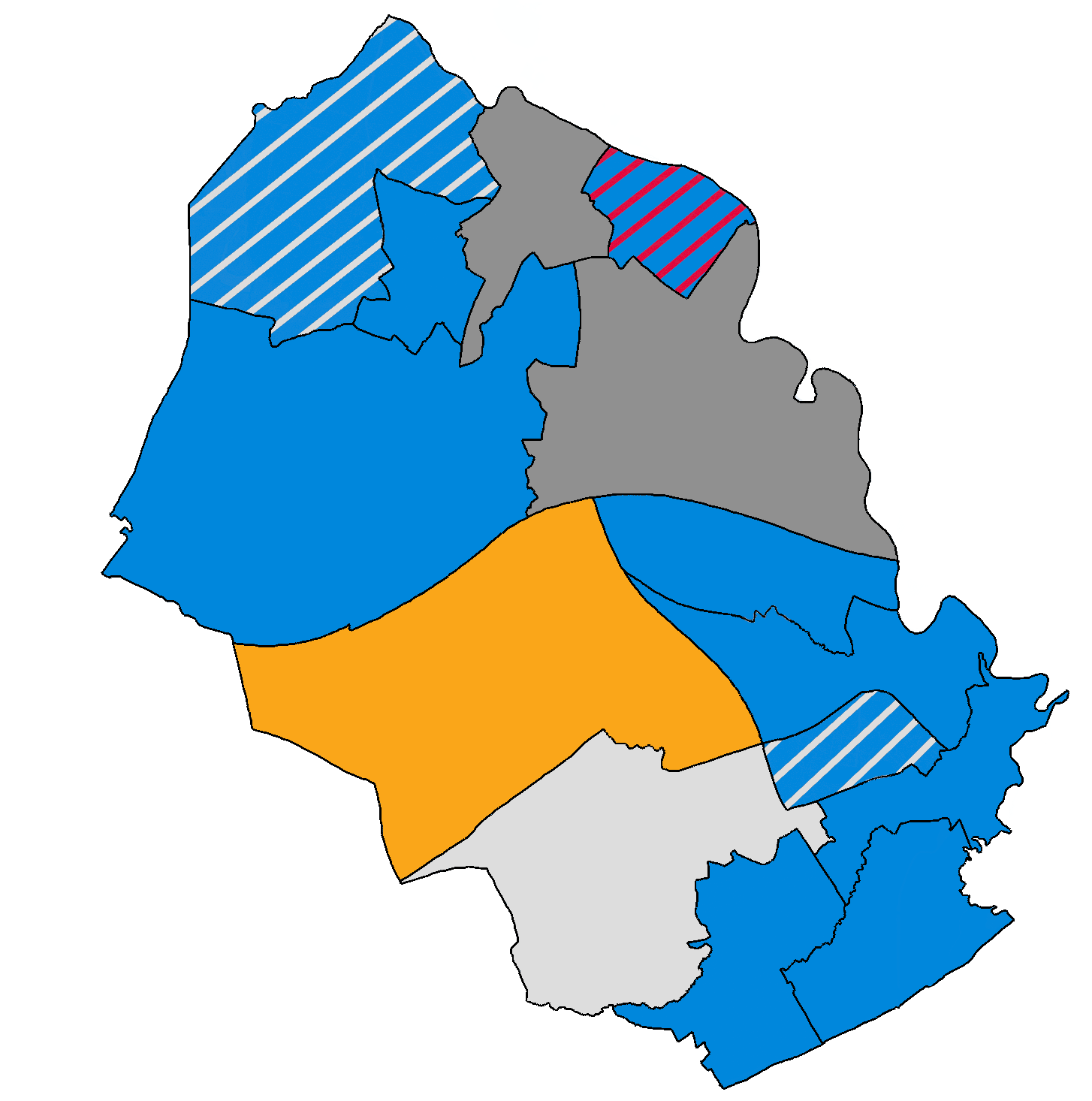
2021 results map

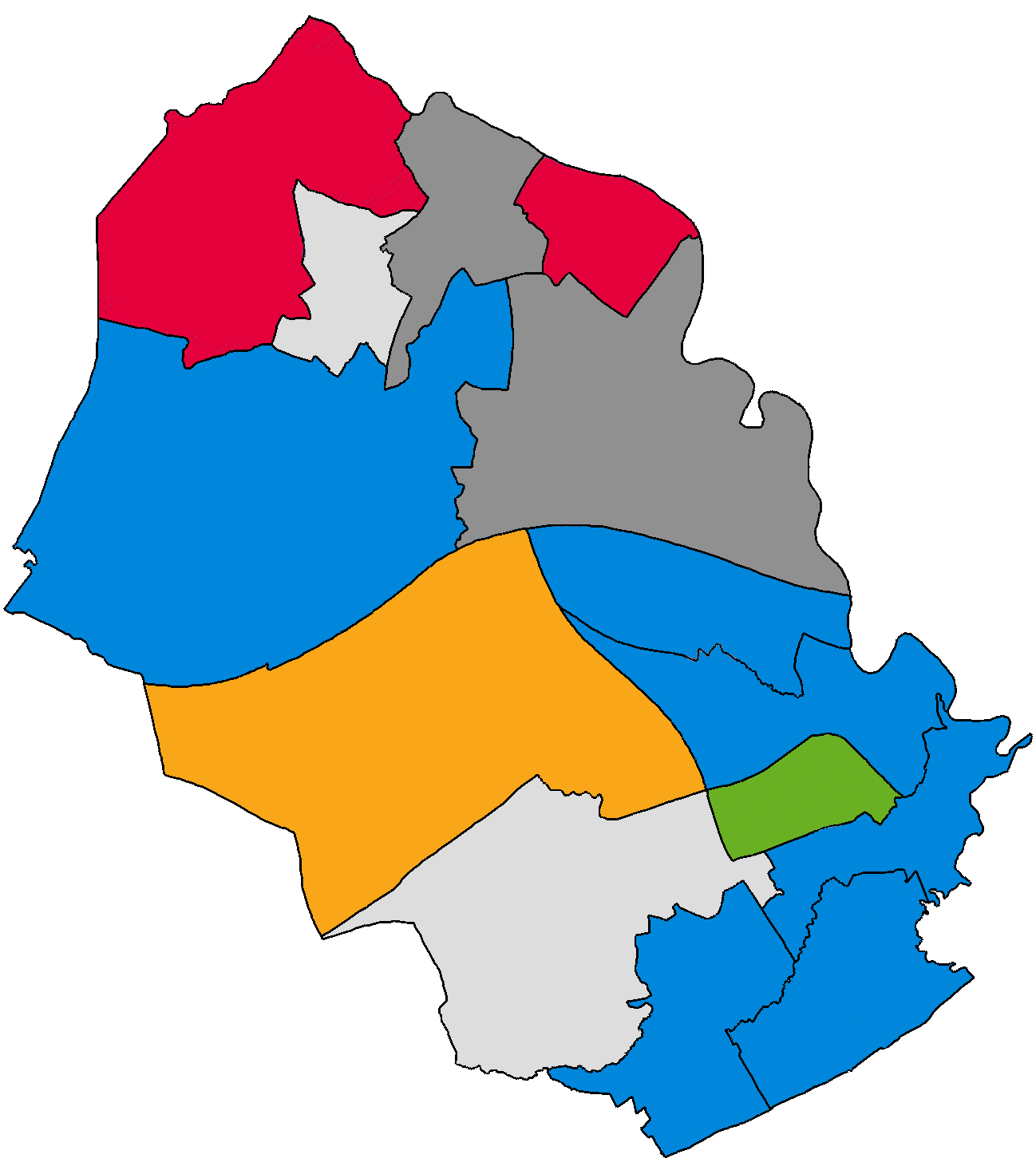
2022 results map

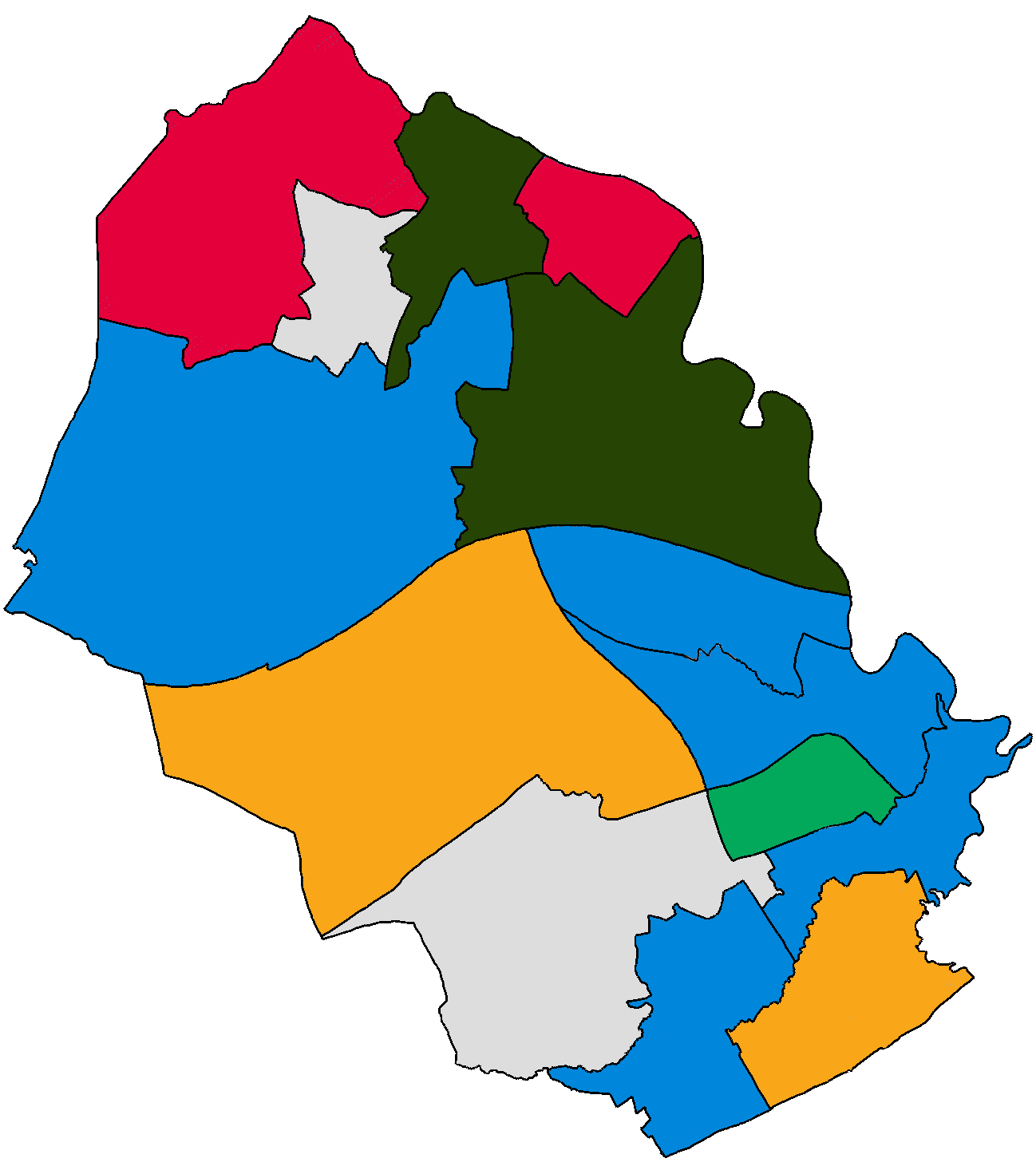
2023 results map

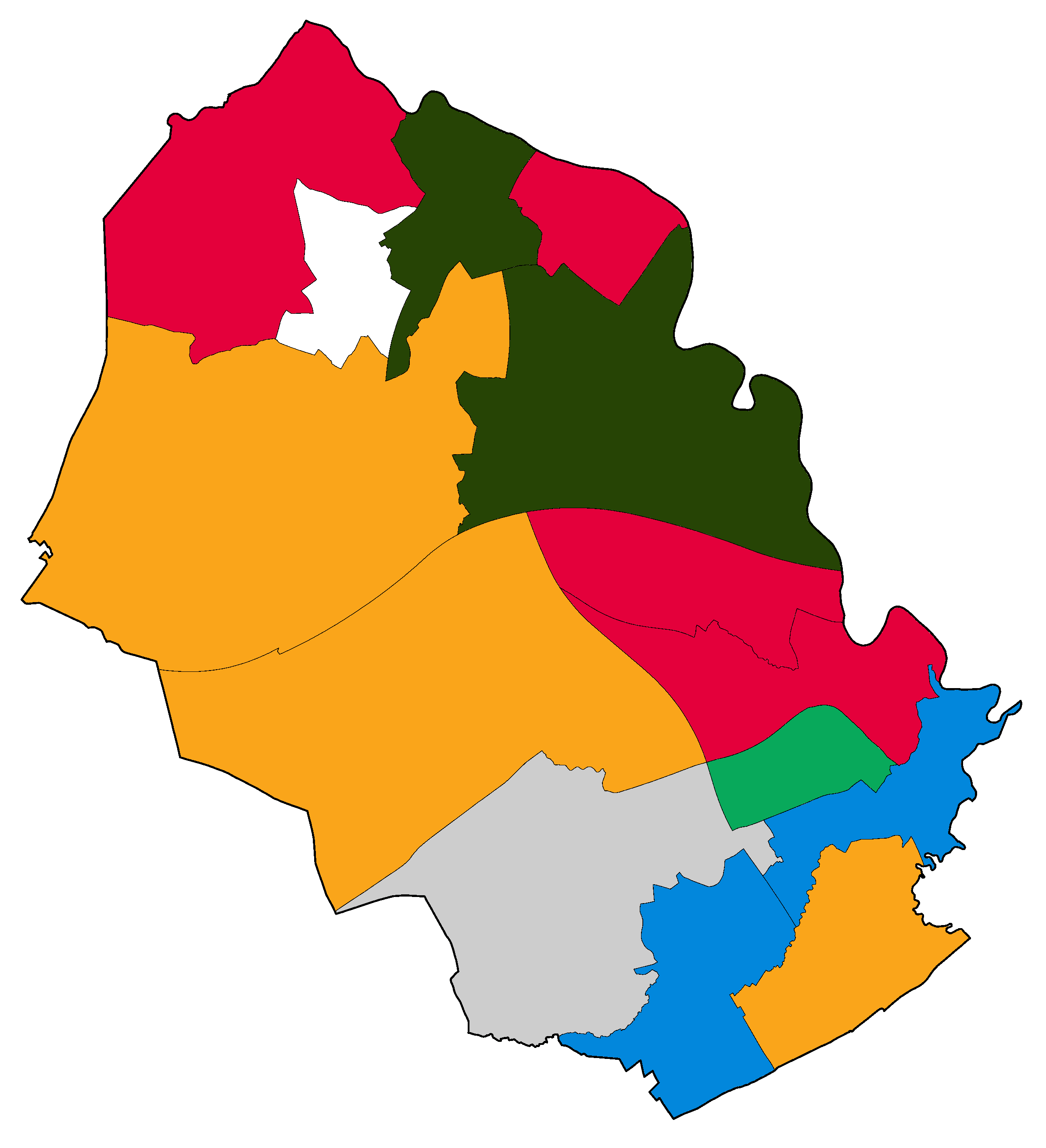
2024 results map

== By-elections ==
=== 1994-1998 ===
Addlestone Bourneside By-Election 6 March 1997
Party	Candidate	Votes	%	±%
Conservative		1,010	50.2	
Labour		835	41.5	
Liberal Democrats		165	8.2	
Majority		175	8.7	
Turnout		2,010	47.0	
Conservative hold		Swing		

=== 1998-2002 ===
Englefield Green East By-Election 7 June 2001
Party	Candidate	Votes	%	±%
Conservative	Virginia Lenton-Smith	924	51.0	−7.0
Liberal Democrats	Peter Key	484	26.7	+1.4
Labour	Martin Rudd	405	22.3	+5.7
Majority		440	24.3	
Turnout		1,813	43.7	
Conservative hold		Swing		

Englefield Green West By-Election 7 June 2001
Party	Candidate	Votes	%	±%
Conservative	Jeffrey Haas	913	45.5	−11.5
Labour	James Walsh	647	33.5	−9.5
Liberal Democrats	Ian Heath	422	21.0	+21.0
Majority		239	12.0	
Turnout		1,982	47.3	
Conservative hold		Swing		

Woodham By-Election 7 June 2001
Party	Candidate	Votes	%	±%
Conservative	Terence McGrath	1,387	51.8	−1.4
Liberal Democrats	Kenneth Graham	739	27.6	−1.5
Labour	Peter Anderson	554	20.7	+2.9
Majority		648	24.2	
Turnout		2,680	62.4	
Conservative hold		Swing		

=== 2002-2006 ===
Englefield Green East By-Election 6 November 2003
Party	Candidate	Votes	%	±%
Conservative	Marisa Heath	350	80.5	+20.2
Labour	Richard Messingham	85	19.5	+8.7
Majority		265	61.0	
Turnout		435	10.8	
Conservative hold		Swing		

=== 2006-2010 ===
Egham Hythe By-Election 4 June 2009
Party	Candidate	Votes	%	±%
Conservative	Gill Warner	720	46.3	−5.5
Independent	Brian Perry	315	20.3	+20.3
Liberal Democrats	Dorian Mead	285	18.3	+3.3
Labour	Paul Greenwood	235	15.1	−7.0
Majority		405	26.0	
Turnout		1,555	33.6	
Conservative hold		Swing		

Englefield Green West By-Election 4 June 2009
Party	Candidate	Votes	%	±%
Conservative	Peter Taylor	485	39.5	−5.0
UKIP	Toby Micklethwait	357	29.1	+3.8
Labour	Sebastian Michnowicz	150	12.2	−0.2
Green	Jenny Gould	128	10.4	+10.4
Liberal Democrats	Ian Heath	108	8.8	+1.4
Majority		128	10.4	
Turnout		1,228	36.1	
Conservative hold		Swing		

Virginia Water By-Election 4 June 2009
Party	Candidate	Votes	%	±%
Conservative	Anthony Ridge-Newman	1,080	64.6	−7.7
Liberal Democrats	Alan Whiteley	376	22.5	+6.5
UKIP	Steve Gynn	216	12.9	+1.3
Majority		704	42.1	
Turnout		1,672	40.8	
Conservative hold		Swing		

Woodham By-Election 4 June 2009
Party	Candidate	Votes	%	±%
Conservative	Gail Kingerley	1,111	65.0	=16.3
Liberal Democrats	Jennifer Coulon	337	19.7	+19.7
Labour	George Blair	177	10.4	−8.4
Equal Parenting Alliance	Keith Collett	84	4.9	+4.9
Majority		774	45.3	
Turnout		1,709	41.2	
Conservative hold		Swing		

=== 2010-2014 ===
Chertsey Meads By-Election 27 September 2012
Party	Candidate	Votes	%	±%
Conservative	Peter Boast	450	40.3	−10.0
UKIP	Chris Browne	312	27.9	+5.2
Labour	Doug Scott	312	27.9	+8.6
Liberal Democrats	Andy Watson	34	3.0	−4.7
Monster Raving Loony	Crazy Crab	10	0.9	+0.9
Majority		138	12.3	
Turnout		1,118		
Conservative hold		Swing		

New Haw By-Election 27 September 2012
Party	Candidate	Votes	%	±%
Conservative	Mark Maddox	346	51.5	−1.4
Labour	David Bell	148	22.0	+2.0
UKIP	Graham Wood	124	18.5	+2.4
Liberal Democrats	Jennifer Coulon	54	8.0	−3.0
Majority		198	29.5	
Turnout		672		
Conservative hold		Swing		

Foxhills By-Election 14 March 2013
Party	Candidate	Votes	%	±%
UKIP	Chris Browne	336	40.2	+17.4
Conservative	Barry Pitt	318	38.1	−8.5
Labour	John Gurney	181	21.7	−0.3
Majority		18	2.2	
Turnout		835		
UKIP gain from Conservative		Swing		

Chertsey South and Row Town By-Election 2 May 2013
Party	Candidate	Votes	%	±%
Independent	Gillian Ellis	525	34.9	−5.3
Conservative	Mark Nuti	476	31.6	−8.7
UKIP	Paul Stevens	361	24.0	+24.0
Labour	Arran Neathey	143	9.5	−5.0
Majority		49	3.3	
Turnout		1,505		
Independent gain from Conservative		Swing		

Chertsey Meads By-Election 13 March 2014
Party	Candidate	Votes	%	±%
Conservative	Mark Nuti	489	42.2	−8.1
Labour	David Bell	329	28.4	+9.1
UKIP	Grahame Leon-Smith	327	28.2	+5.5
Monster Raving Loony	Crazy Crab	15	1.3	+1.3
Majority		160	13.8	
Turnout		1,160		
Conservative hold		Swing		

=== 2014-2018 ===
Foxhills By-Election 4 May 2017
Party	Candidate	Votes	%	±%
Conservative	Emma Bancroft	893	57.8	+3.8
Liberal Democrats	Don Whyte	243	15.7	+15.7
Labour	Peter Kingham	188	12.2	−4.2
UKIP	Valerie Woodhouse	173	11.2	−18.5
Green	Lee-Anne Lawrence	49	3.2	+3.2
Majority		650	42.0	
Turnout		1,546		
Conservative hold		Swing		

=== 2022-2026 ===
Addlestone South By-Election 10 October 2024
Party	Candidate	Votes	%	±%
Conservative	Steve Eldridge	520	55.9	+13.9
Labour	Elaine Percival	262	28.2	−13.2
Liberal Democrats	Jenny Coulon	85	9.1	−7.6
Green	Jess Ward	63	6.8	+6.8
Majority		258	27.7	
Turnout		930		
Conservative hold		Swing		

Ottershaw By-Election 12 December 2024
Party	Candidate	Votes	%	±%
Independent	Robert Day	440	41.6	
Conservative	Mike Kusneraitis	221	20.9	
Liberal Democrats	Ronan McCaughey	190	18.0	
Reform	Mayuran Senthilnathan	113	10.7	
Labour	Anne Emerson-Miller	52	4.9	
Green	Peter Chiverton	42	4.0	
Majority		219	20.7	
Turnout		1,058		
Independent hold		Swing		

Addlestone South By-Election 21 August 2025 (2 seats)
Party	Candidate	Votes	%	±%
Reform	Scott Kelly	467		
Reform	Sam Newman	414		
Liberal Democrats	Jenny Coulon	356		
Liberal Democrats	Ronan McCaughey	352		
Conservative	Howard Freeman	329		
Conservative	Mike Kusneraitis	273		
Labour	Elaine Percival	146		
Green	Izabela Wawryszuk	145		
Labour	Arran Neathey	129		
Reform gain from Conservative		Swing		
Reform gain from Conservative		Swing		
