= 2010 Runnymede Borough Council election =

Local election in Surrey, UK

Results of the 2010 Runnymede Borough Council election

Elections to Runnymede Borough Council were held on 6 May 2010, alongside other local elections across England as well as the 2010 United Kingdom general election. 16 seats (one third) of the council were up for election. The previous council election took place in 2008 and the following election was held in 2011. Following the election the council remained under Conservative control.

== Results summary ==
2010 Elmbridge Borough Council election
Party	Seats Before	Change	Seats After
Conservative Party	32	Steady	33
Residents Association	18	Steady	18

== See also ==
- Runnymede Borough Council elections
