= 2012 Runnymede Borough Council election =

2012 UK local government election

Results of the 2012 Runnymede Borough Council election

The 2012 Runnymede Borough Council election took place on 3 May 2012 to elect members of the Runnymede Borough District Council. The Conservative Party won 12 of the seats and the local Runnymede Independent Residents' Group won 2; both parties held onto their seats from the 2011 elections.

== Election result ==
Runnymede Borough Election, 2012
Party	Seats	Gains	Losses	Net gain/loss	Seats %	Votes %	Votes	+/−
Conservative	12				85.7%	48.6%	7,806	
RIRG	2				14.3%	11.0%	1,766	
Labour	0				0%	19.8%	3,177	
UKIP	0				0%	8.8%	1,413	
Liberal Democrats	0				0%	7.0%	1,126	
Independent	0				0%	3.1%	503	
Green	0				0%	1.1%	184	
Monster Raving Loony	0				0%	0.6%	99	

== Ward results ==
Addlestone Bourneside (1 Councillor)
Party	Candidate	Votes	%	±%
Labour	Gavin Morrison	396	32.02%	+4.21%
Liberal Democrats	Cleo Saise	124	12.03%	+1.12%
Conservative	Cherith Simmons	717	57.97%	
Majority		717	57.97%	−3.33%
Turnout		1,237	28.20%	−11.10%

Addlestone North (1 Councillor)
Party	Candidate	Votes	%	±%
Monster Raving Loony	Keith Collett	99	9.14%	+6.24%
Labour	Anne Emerson-Miller	366	33.78%	+5.95%
Liberal Democrats	Geoff Pyle	134	12.37%	+1.18%
Conservative	Nick Wase-Rogers	485	44.75%	
Majority		485	44.75%	−13.35%
Turnout		1,084	23.80%	−11.30%

Chertsey Meads (1 Councillor)
Party	Candidate	Votes	%	±%
UKIP	Christopher Browne	281	22.67%	+4.28%
Conservative	Diana Cotty	624	50.33%	
Liberal Democrats	Peter Key	96	7.75%	−0.64%
Labour	Doug Scott	239	19.28%	+0.29%
Majority		624	50.33%	−3.95%
Turnout		1,240	27.10%	−11.40%

Chertsey South & Row Town (1 Councillor)
Party	Candidate	Votes	%	±%
Labour	Ken Denyer	181	14.47%	−2.49%
Conservative	John Edwards	504	40.29%	
Independent	Gillian Ellis	503	40.21%	+21.55%
Liberal Democrats	Derek Weston	63	5.04%	−4.93%
Majority		504	40.29%	−14.15%
Turnout		1,251	40.50%	−4.30%

Chertsey St. Anns (1 Councillor)
Party	Candidate	Votes	%	±%
Labour	Paul Greenwood	496	37.13%	+4.85%
UKIP	Angela Shepperdson	318	23.81%	+2.21%
Conservative	Shannon Saise-Marshall	522	39.08%	
Majority		522	39.08%	−7.05%
Turnout		1,336	26.90%	−8.10%

Egham Hythe (1 Councillor)
Party	Candidate	Votes	%	±%
Conservative	Yvonna Lay	524	51.28%	
Liberal Democrats	Dorian Meade	166	16.25%	−4.99%
Labour	Bernie Stacey	332	32.49%	
Majority		524	51.28%	−0.11%
Turnout		1,022	21%	−12.20%

Egham Town (1 Councillor)
Party	Candidate	Votes	%	±%
Liberal Democrats	Lawrence Gillies	71	6.44%	
RIRG	David Knight	815	73.83%	
Conservative	Barry Pitt	218	19.75%	
Majority		815	73.83%	+20.41%
Turnout		1,104	26.10%	−13.30%

Englefield Green East (1 Councillor)
Party	Candidate	Votes	%	±%
Labour	Debs Greenwood	132	17.33%	
Conservative	Marisa Heath	424	55.65%	
UKIP	Ben Lyon	110	14.44%	+2.11%
Liberal Democrats	Andy Watson	96	12.60%	−17.75%
Majority		424	55.65%	−1.69%
Turnout		762	18%	−11%

Englefield Green West (1 Councillor)
Party	Candidate	Votes	%	±%
UKIP	Steve Gynn	244	29.19%	
Green	Rustam Majainah	184	22.01%	
Conservative	Hugh Meares	408	48.81%	
Majority		408	48.81%	−18.17%
Turnout		836	23.70%	−9.40%

Foxhills (1 Councillor)
Party	Candidate	Votes	%	±%
Conservative	Iftikhar Chaudhri	581	46.63%	
Liberal Democrats	Andrew Falconer	107	8.59%	
Labour	John Gurney	274	22%	+4.29%
UKIP	Graham Wood	284	22.80%	
Majority		581	46.63%	−8.85%
Turnout		1,246	29.30%	−12.80%

New Haw (1 Councillor)
Party	Candidate	Votes	%	±%
Labour	David Bell	218	19.99%	+3.25%
Liberal Democrats	Jennifer Coulon	120	11%	−2.93%
UKIP	Leon Mullet	176	16.14%	+2.87%
Conservative	Adrian Tollett	577	52.89%	
Majority		577	52.89%	−3.18%
Turnout		1,091	24.40%	−13.70%

Thorpe (1 Councillor)
Party	Candidate	Votes	%	±%
RIRG	Elaine Gill	951	68.77%	
Labour	James Hale	104	7.52%	+0.92%
Conservative	Geoff Roberts	328	23.72%	
Majority		951	68.77%	+10.29%
Turnout		1,383	32%	−11.70%

Virginia Water (1 Councillor)
Party	Candidate	Votes	%	±%
Liberal Democrats	Ian Heath	149	12.62%	+1.10%
Labour	Peter Kingham	149	12.62%	+0.47%
Conservative	Margaret Roberts	883	74.77%	−1.58%
Majority		883	74.77%	−1.58%
Turnout		1,181	30.50%	−9.80%

Woodham (1 Councillor)
Party	Candidate	Votes	%	±%
Conservative	Valerie Dunster	1,011	77.71%	
Labour	Brenda Head	290	22.29%	+0.70%
Majority		1,011	77.71%	+11.14%
Turnout		1,301	30.50%	−15.20%
