= 2000 Runnymede Borough Council election =

2000 UK local government election

Elections to Runnymede Council were held on 4 May 2000. The whole council was up for election with boundary changes since the last election in 1999. The Conservative Party stayed in overall control of the council.

== Election result ==
Runnymede local election result 2000
| Party | Seats | Gains | Losses | Net gain/loss | Seats % | Votes % | Votes | +/− |
|---|---|---|---|---|---|---|---|---|
| Conservative | 33 | | | +8 | 78.6 | 59.3 | 27,891 | +8.8% |
| Independent Residents | 6 | | | 0 | 14.3 | 9.8 | 4,609 | -0.4% |
| Labour | 3 | | | -6 | 7.1 | 21.2 | 9,949 | -6.2% |
| Liberal Democrats | 0 | | | -2 | 0 | 8.9 | 4,163 | -2.9% |
| Independent | 0 | | | 0 | 0 | 0.9 | 400 | +0.9% |

== Ward results ==
Addlestone Bourneside (3)
| Party | Candidate | Votes | % | ±% |
|---|---|---|---|---|
| Conservative | Patricia Broadhead | 957 | | |
| Conservative | Peter Waddell | 916 | | |
| Conservative | John Furey | 887 | | |
| Labour | Peter Wren | 415 | | |
| Labour | Godfrey Jenkins | 387 | | |
| Turnout | | 3,562 | 32.6 | |

Addlestone North (3)
| Party | Candidate | Votes | % | ±% |
|---|---|---|---|---|
| Conservative | Cherith Simmons | 754 | | |
| Conservative | David Parr | 747 | | |
| Conservative | Graham Thomas | 721 | | |
| Labour | Paul Greenwood | 538 | | |
| Labour | Adrian Elston | 517 | | |
| Labour | Michael Pear | 493 | | |
| Liberal Democrats | Geoffrey Pyle | 173 | | |
| Turnout | | 3,943 | 32.4 | |

Chertsey Mead (3)
| Party | Candidate | Votes | % | ±% |
|---|---|---|---|---|
| Conservative | Christopher Norman | 760 | | |
| Conservative | Sarah Jacobs | 703 | | |
| Conservative | Edwin Pattington | 679 | | |
| Labour | Mary Lowther | 555 | | |
| Labour | James Walsh | 481 | | |
| Labour | Richelle Colwill | 479 | | |
| Turnout | | 3,657 | 30.0 | |

Chertsey St. Ann's (3)
| Party | Candidate | Votes | % | ±% |
|---|---|---|---|---|
| Conservative | Judith Norman | 558 | | |
| Conservative | Victor Barker | 541 | | |
| Conservative | Dolsie Clarke | 536 | | |
| Labour | Peter Anderson | 512 | | |
| Labour | Steven Jenkins | 512 | | |
| Labour | Peter Kingham | 470 | | |
| Turnout | | 3,129 | 25.4 | |

Chertsey South and Row Town (3)
| Party | Candidate | Votes | % | ±% |
|---|---|---|---|---|
| Conservative | Kenneth Clark | 914 | | |
| Conservative | Terry Dicks | 901 | | |
| Conservative | John Edwards | 891 | | |
| Liberal Democrats | Alan Graham | 390 | | |
| Labour | Kenneth Denyer | 369 | | |
| Turnout | | 3,465 | 34.6 | |

Egham (3)
| Party | Candidate | Votes | % | ±% |
|---|---|---|---|---|
| Independent Residents | Anthony Moore | 784 | | |
| Independent Residents | John Ashmore | 774 | | |
| Independent Residents | Brian Clarke | 690 | | |
| Conservative | Ian Angell | 267 | | |
| Conservative | Nigel Saul | 241 | | |
| Conservative | David Seager | 216 | | |
| Labour | Monica Dowling | 157 | | |
| Turnout | | 3,129 | 27.3 | |

Englefield Green East (3)
| Party | Candidate | Votes | % | ±% |
|---|---|---|---|---|
| Conservative | Alec Collins | 523 | | |
| Conservative | Kevin Walmsley | 518 | | |
| Conservative | Timothy Stones | 505 | | |
| Liberal Democrats | Peter Russell | 250 | | |
| Liberal Democrats | Ian Heath | 218 | | |
| Liberal Democrats | Peter Key | 206 | | |
| Labour | Martin Rudd | 148 | | |
| Turnout | | 2,368 | 20.2 | |

Englefield Green West (3)
| Party | Candidate | Votes | % | ±% |
|---|---|---|---|---|
| Conservative | Hugh Meares | 640 | | |
| Conservative | Anthony Richardson | 604 | | |
| Conservative | Carole Jones | 573 | | |
| Labour | Alan Clark | 483 | | |
| Labour | James Swindlehurst | 410 | | |
| Labour | Keith Thompson | 407 | | |
| Turnout | | 3,117 | 27.3 | |

Foxhills (3)
| Party | Candidate | Votes | % | ±% |
|---|---|---|---|---|
| Conservative | David Easton | 866 | | |
| Conservative | Frances Barden | 844 | | |
| Conservative | Roger Habgood | 844 | | |
| Labour | Bernie Stacey | 293 | | |
| Turnout | | 2,847 | 27.0 | |

Hythe (3)
| Party | Candidate | Votes | % | ±% |
|---|---|---|---|---|
| Labour | Edward Barrett | 527 | | |
| Labour | Rodney Pate | 459 | | |
| Labour | Joan Barrett | 433 | | |
| Conservative | Gemma Edwards | 294 | | |
| Liberal Democrats | Dorian Mead | 277 | | |
| Conservative | Mark Seager | 276 | | |
| Conservative | Janet Walsh | 276 | | |
| Turnout | | 2,542 | 19.7 | |

New Haw (3)
| Party | Candidate | Votes | % | ±% |
|---|---|---|---|---|
| Conservative | Adrian Tollett | 722 | | |
| Conservative | Paul Elding | 695 | | |
| Conservative | Paul Tuley | 688 | | |
| Liberal Democrats | Kenneth Graham | 667 | | |
| Liberal Democrats | Terence Gibbons | 565 | | |
| Liberal Democrats | Annie Miller | 561 | | |
| Labour | Victor Kirk | 147 | | |
| Turnout | | 4,045 | 32.3 | |

Thorpe (3)
| Party | Candidate | Votes | % | ±% |
|---|---|---|---|---|
| Independent Residents | Eiry Price | 820 | | |
| Independent Residents | Linda Gillham | 791 | | |
| Independent Residents | Francis Tourlamain | 750 | | |
| Conservative | Pamela Burridge | 365 | | |
| Conservative | Edith Speakman | 350 | | |
| Conservative | Elise Whiteley | 336 | | |
| Labour | Robert Findlay | 129 | | |
| Labour | Robert Ray | 124 | | |
| Turnout | | 3,665 | 30.3 | |

Virginia Water (3)
| Party | Candidate | Votes | % | ±% |
|---|---|---|---|---|
| Conservative | Peter Poole | 954 | | |
| Conservative | Geoffrey Woodger | 943 | | |
| Conservative | John Whiteley | 868 | | |
| Independent | Peter Gaskin | 400 | | |
| Liberal Democrats | Thomas Palm | 264 | | |
| Labour | William Heal | 142 | | |
| Turnout | | 3,571 | 32.0 | |

Woodham (3)
| Party | Candidate | Votes | % | ±% |
|---|---|---|---|---|
| Conservative | Valerie Smallman | 1,083 | | |
| Conservative | Florence Angell | 1,028 | | |
| Conservative | Dennis Dormer | 907 | | |
| Liberal Democrats | Janet Cockle | 592 | | |
| Labour | Angela Gould | 362 | | |
| Turnout | | 3,972 | 36.8 | |
