= 2004 Runnymede Borough Council election =

2004 UK local government election

Results of the 2004 Runnymede Borough Council election

Elections to Runnymede Council were held on 10 June 2004. One third of the council was up for election and the Conservative Party stayed in overall control of the council.

After the election, the composition of the council was:

- Conservative 33
- Runnymede Residents Association 6
- Labour 3

== Election result ==
Runnymede local election result 2004
Party	Seats	Gains	Losses	Net gain/loss	Seats %	Votes %	Votes	+/−
Conservative	12	1	0	+1	85.7	51.7	10,440	-4.1%
RIRG	2	0	0	0	14.3	10.3	2,080	+0.1%
Labour	0	0	1	-1	0	17.7	3,577	-4.0%
Liberal Democrats	0	0	0	0	0	12.7	2,569	+3.0%
UKIP	0	0	0	0	0	6.6	1,336	+4.5%
Independent	0	0	0	0	0	0.9	190	+0.9%

== Ward results ==
Addlestone Bourneside
Party	Candidate	Votes	%	±%
Conservative	Patricia Broadhead	920	64.4	−6.5
Labour	Keith Cliff	319	22.3	−6.8
Independent	Colin Stephens	190	13.3	+13.3
Majority		601	42.1	+0.3
Turnout		1,429	35.2	+8.7
Conservative hold		Swing		

Addlestone North
Party	Candidate	Votes	%	±%
Conservative	Cherith Simmons	819	60.8	
Labour	Brenda Head	317	23.5	
Liberal Democrats	Peter Key	212	15.7	
Majority		502	37.3	
Turnout		1,348	32.6	+8.1
Conservative hold		Swing		

Chertsey Meads
Party	Candidate	Votes	%	±%
Conservative	Christopher Norman	725	48.4	+1.3
UKIP	Christopher Browne	300	20.0	+7.6
Labour	Bernie Stacey	247	16.5	−3.5
Liberal Democrats	Prue Horne	225	15.0	−5.5
Majority		425	28.4	+1.8
Turnout		1,497	35.8	+8.8
Conservative hold		Swing		

Chertsey St.Ann's
Party	Candidate	Votes	%	±%
Conservative	Judith Norman	903	59.2	+11.3
Labour	James Walsh	623	40.8	−2.2
Majority		280	18.4	+13.5
Turnout		1,526	36.3	+10.8
Conservative hold		Swing		

Chertsey South and Row Town
Party	Candidate	Votes	%	±%
Conservative	John Edwards	1,034	65.6	−14.0
Liberal Democrats	Aileen Owen Davies	304	19.3	+19.3
Labour	Kenneth Denyer	239	15.2	−5.2
Majority		730	46.3	−12.9
Turnout		1,577	40.0	+8.5
Conservative hold		Swing		

Egham Town
Party	Candidate	Votes	%	±%
RIRG	Anthony Moore	975	65.1	−3.7
Conservative	Rebecca Nixey	330	22.0	+3.5
Labour	Keith Thompson	193	12.9	+0.2
Majority		645	43.1	−7.2
Turnout		1,498	35.7	+9.8
RIRG hold		Swing		

Englefield Green East
Party	Candidate	Votes	%	±%
Conservative	Marisa Heath	493	52.2	−8.1
Liberal Democrats	Peter Russell	230	24.3	−4.6
UKIP	Toby Micklethwait	126	13.3	+13.3
Labour	Peter Kingham	96	10.2	−0.6
Majority		263	27.9	−3.5
Turnout		945	23.8	+6.6
Conservative hold		Swing		

Englefield Green West
Party	Candidate	Votes	%	±%
Conservative	Hugh Meares	574	50.2	−4.3
Labour	Richard Messingham	229	20.0	+2.7
UKIP	Harold Pearce	188	16.4	+3.9
Liberal Democrats	Ian Heath	152	13.3	−2.4
Majority		345	30.2	−7.0
Turnout		1,143	28.4	+7.3
Conservative hold		Swing		

Foxhills
Party	Candidate	Votes	%	±%
Conservative	Ruth Haylor	806	52.9	−9.6
UKIP	Leon Mullett	270	17.7	+9.9
Liberal Democrats	Terence Gibbons	233	15.3	+0.6
Labour	John Gurney	216	14.2	−0.9
Majority		536	35.2	−12.2
Turnout		1,525	36.7	+7.2
Conservative hold		Swing		

Hythe
Party	Candidate	Votes	%	±%
Conservative	Yvonna Lay	519	36.8	−4.7
Labour	Edward Barrett	447	31.7	−11.4
UKIP	Derek Sheppard	254	18.0	+18.0
Liberal Democrats	Dorian Mead	192	13.6	−1.8
Majority		72	5.1	
Turnout		1,412	29.9	+6.8
Conservative gain from Labour		Swing		

New Haw
Party	Candidate	Votes	%	±%
Conservative	Adrian Tollett	853	59.5	−2.0
Liberal Democrats	Jennifer Coulon	359	25.1	+1.3
Labour	Angela Gould	221	15.4	+0.6
Majority		494	34.4	−3.3
Turnout		1,433	33.5	+8.3
Conservative hold		Swing		

Thorpe
Party	Candidate	Votes	%	±%
RIRG	Elaine Gill	1,105	66.1	−2.4
Conservative	Janet Dicks	442	26.4	+3.4
Labour	Michael Fuller	125	7.5	−1.1
Majority		663	39.7	−5.8
Turnout		1,672	39.0	+8.6
RIRG hold		Swing		

Virginia Water
Party	Candidate	Votes	%	±%
Conservative	Margaret Roberts	975	63.6	−14.3
Liberal Democrats	Thomas Palm	254	16.6	+2.7
UKIP	Steve Gynn	198	12.9	+12.9
Labour	Monica Dowling	106	6.9	−1.3
Majority		721	47.0	−17.0
Turnout		1,533	36.8	+10.3
Conservative hold		Swing		

Woodham
Party	Candidate	Votes	%	±%
Conservative	Christopher Ruane	1,047	63.3	−2.1
Liberal Democrats	Janet Cockle	408	24.7	+4.9
Labour	Adrian Elston	199	12.0	−2.8
Majority		839	38.6	−7.0
Turnout		1,654	39.3	+8.0
Conservative hold		Swing		
