= 2021 Runnymede Borough Council election =

2021 UK local government election

- 6 May 2021

13 of the 41 seats in the Runnymede Borough Council 21 seats needed for a majority
- Registered: 59,426
- Turnout: 33.6% (▲2.6 pp)
	First party	Second party
	Con	Res
Leader	Nick Prescot	Linda Gillham
Party	Conservative	RIRG
Leader since	2017	2018
Leader's seat	Englefield Green West	Thorpe
Last election	26	6
Seats before	25	6
Seats won	9	2
Seats after	26	6
Seat change	▲1	Steady
Popular vote	8,893	1,809
Percentage	44.5%	9.1%
	Third party	Fourth party
	LD	Lab
Leader	Don Whyte	Robert King
Party	Liberal Democrats	Labour Co-op
Leader since	2019	2021
Leader's seat	Longcross, Lyne and Chertsey South	Egham Hythe
Last election	3	2
Seats before	3	2
Seats won	1	0
Seats after	3	1
Seat change	Steady	▼1
Popular vote	2,759	3,331
Percentage	13.8%	16.7%
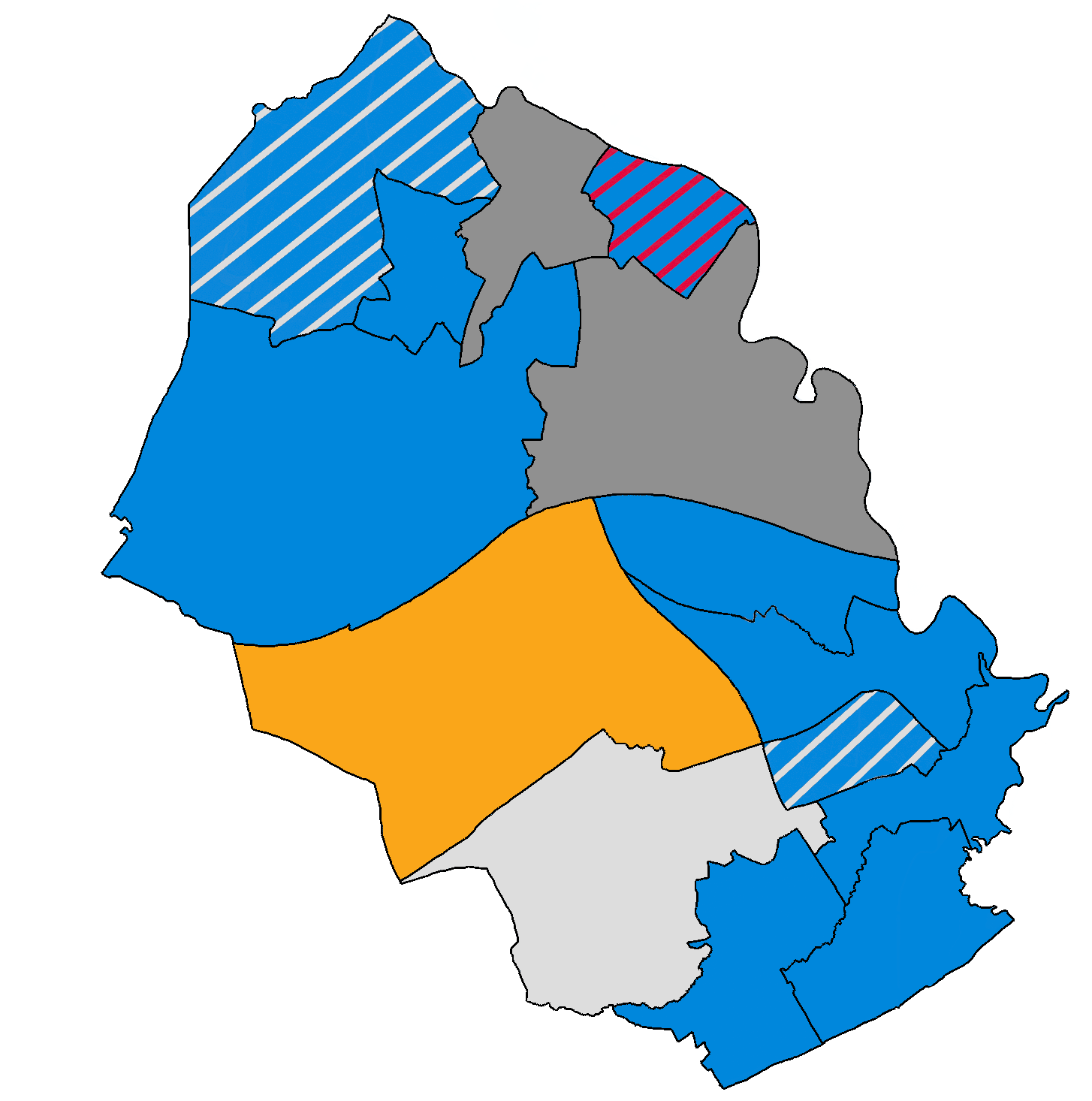
- Map of the parties of the councillors representing each of the wards following the election. Colours denote the party, as shown in the main table of results.
Council control before election
Conservative
Council control after election
Conservative

The 2021 Runnymede Borough Council election was held on 6 May 2021 to elect members of Runnymede Borough Council in England. This was on the same day as other local elections, and was the second election on new electoral boundaries, following the 2019 Runnymede Borough Council election. The elections were postponed from May 2020 due to the COVID-19 pandemic Englefield Green East was not contested.

The Conservatives retained control of the council, increasing their total number of seats by one. Following the election, the party held 26 of the 41 seats on the council, compared with 6 for the Runnymede Independent Residents Group, 5 Independents, 3 Liberal Democrats and 1 seat for the Labour Party.

The political changeover of seats is as follows: Conservative candidate Alex Balkan gained Egham Hythe Ward from the Labour Party, Conservative candidate Bob Bromley gained Addlestone North from the Green Party, independent candidate Carl Mann gained Ottershaw from the Conservative Party.

== Results summary ==
Runnymede Borough Council Election 2021
Party	This election				Full council			This election		
Party	Candidates	Seats	Net	Seats %	Other	Total	Total %	Votes	Votes %	+/−
Conservative	{{{candidates}}}	9	▲1	69.2	17	26	63.4	8,893	44.5	
Labour	{{{candidates}}}	0	▼1	0.0	1	1	2.4	3,331	16.7	
Liberal Democrats	{{{candidates}}}	1	Steady	7.7	2	3	7.3	2,759	13.8	
Independent	{{{candidates}}}	1	▲1	7.7	4	5	12.2	2,226	11.1	
RIRG	{{{candidates}}}	2	Steady	15.4	4	6	14.6	1,809	9.1	
Green	{{{candidates}}}	0	▼1	0.0	0	0	0.0	714	3.6	
TUSC	{{{candidates}}}	0	Steady	0.0	0	0	0.0	35	0.2	

== Ward results ==
=== Addlestone North ===
Addlestone North
Party	Candidate	Votes	%	±%
Conservative	Bob Bromley	625	46.92	+15.09
Green	Steve Ringham	310	23.27	−10.20
Labour Co-op	Adrian Elston	251	18.84	−1.83
Liberal Democrats	Rudi Dikty-Daudiyan	111	8.33	−13.25
TUSC	Lisa Allen	35	2.63	N/A
Rejected ballots		22		
Turnout		1,354	30.53	
Conservative gain from Green		Swing		

=== Addlestone South ===
Addlestone South
Party	Candidate	Votes	%	±%
Conservative	John Furey	845	57.56	+11.98
Labour Co-op	Michael Scott	394	26.84	−5.52
Liberal Democrats	Raymond Williamson	229	15.60	N/A
Rejected ballots		25		
Turnout		1,310	28.98	
Conservative hold		Swing		

=== Chertsey Riverside ===
Chertsey Riverside
Party	Candidate	Votes	%	±%
Conservative	Stephen Dennett	710	54.70	+6.76
Labour Co-op	Wrenna Robson	302	23.27	−6.71
Liberal Democrats	Kevin Lee	193	14.87	−17.09
Independent	Tommy Traylen	93	7.16	N/A
Rejected ballots		12		
Turnout		1,310	28.98	
Conservative hold		Swing		

=== Chertsey St. Ann's ===
Chertsey St. Ann's
Party	Candidate	Votes	%	±%
Conservative	Myles Willingale	761	52.63	+10.80
Labour Co-op	Phillip Martin	270	18.67	−10.38
Green	Amanda Hamer	208	14.38	N/A
Liberal Democrats	Annabel Jones	207	14.32	−13.14
Rejected ballots		24		
Turnout		1,470	29.80	
Conservative hold		Swing		

=== Egham Hythe ===
Egham Hythe
Party	Candidate	Votes	%	±%
Conservative	Alex Balkan	694	42.60	−1.15
Labour Co-op	Arran Neathey	666	40.88	−3.41
Independent	Robert Hall	269	16.51	N/A
Rejected ballots		14		
Turnout		1,643	32.11	
Conservative gain from Labour		Swing		

=== Egham Town ===
Egham Town
Party	Candidate	Votes	%	±%
RIRG	Sian Williams	917	52.91	−5.34
Conservative	Max Darby	372	21.47	−2.70
Labour Co-op	Keith Heal	355	20.48	+7.21
Liberal Democrats	Ian Heath	89	5.14	N/A
Rejected ballots		15		
Turnout		1,748	35.56	
RIRG hold		Swing		

=== Englefield Green West ===
Englefield Green West
Party	Candidate	Votes	%	±%
Conservative	Nick Prescot	548	47.65	+8.87
Labour	Dominic Breen	242	21.04	−8.86
Green	Udo Kleinitz	196	17.04	−18.90
Independent	Jay Myles	164	14.26	−3.49
Rejected ballots		14		
Turnout		1,164	27.06	
Conservative hold		Swing		

=== Longcross, Lyne and Chertsey South ===
Longcross, Lyne and Chertsey South
Party	Candidate	Votes	%	±%
Liberal Democrats	Theresa Burton	473	45.66	+12.86
Conservative	Shannon Saise-Marshall	420	40.54	+9.05
Independent	Lynette Cressey	143	13.80	N/A
Rejected ballots		15		
Turnout		1,051	39.35	
Liberal Democrats hold		Swing		

=== New Haw ===
New Haw
Party	Candidate	Votes	%	±%
Conservative	Stephen Walsh	834	56.39	+7.08
Liberal Democrats	Kevin Decruz	645	43.61	+3.60
Rejected ballots		25		
Turnout		1,504	30.47	
Conservative hold		Swing		

=== Ottershaw ===
Ottershaw
Party	Candidate	Votes	%	±%
Independent	Carl Mann	855	45.00	N/A
Conservative	Neill Rubidge	675	35.53	+7.40
Labour Co-op	Anne Emerson-Miller	250	13.16	−2.11
Liberal Democrats	Stuart Lawrence	120	6.32	−13.70
Rejected ballots		10		
Turnout		1,910	39.01	
Independent gain from Conservative		Swing		

=== Thorpe ===
Thorpe
Party	Candidate	Votes	%	±%
RIRG	Margaret Harnden	892	51.03	−6.29
Conservative	Nick Wase-Rogers	591	33.81	+13.44
Labour Co-op	Abby King	192	10.98	+1.20
Liberal Democrats	Cheryl Smith-Wright	73	4.18	N/A
Rejected ballots		18		
Turnout		1,766	40.15	
RIRG hold		Swing		

=== Virginia Water ===
Virginia Water
Party	Candidate	Votes	%	±%
Conservative	David Coen	709	42.08	−18.67
Independent	Karin Rowsell	411	24.39	N/A
Liberal Democrats	Roz Abery-Maree	403	23.92	N/A
Labour Co-op	Karen Mickinlay-Gunn	162	9.61	−13.94
Rejected ballots		10		
Turnout		1,695	38.58	
Conservative hold		Swing		

=== Woodham and Rowtown ===
Woodham and Rowtown
Party	Candidate	Votes	%	±%
Conservative	Scott Lewis	1,109	59.53	+6.88
Independent	Robert Day	291	15.62	N/A
Labour Co-op	Jack Stokes	247	13.26	−7.88
Liberal Democrats	Jennifer Coulon	216	11.59	N/A
Rejected ballots		12		
Turnout		1,875	37.94	
Conservative hold		Swing		
