= 2003 Runnymede Borough Council election =

2003 UK local government election

Results of the 2003 Runnymede Borough Council election

Elections to Runnymede Council were held on 1 May 2003. One third of the council was up for election and the Conservative Party stayed in overall control of the council.

After the election, the composition of the council was:

- Conservative 32
- Runnymede Residents Association 6
- Labour 4

== Election result ==
Runnymede local election result 2003
Party	Seats	Gains	Losses	Net gain/loss	Seats %	Votes %	Votes	+/−
Conservative	12	0	0	0	80.0	55.8	9,253	-4.0%
RIRG	2	0	0	0	13.3	10.2	1,689	+1.4%
Labour	1	0	0	0	6.7	21.7	3,597	-1.0%
Liberal Democrats	0	0	0	0	0	9.7	1,606	+1.5%
UKIP	0	0	0	0	0	2.1	347	+2.1%
Monster Raving Loony	0	0	0	0	0	0.6	103	+0.6%

== Ward results ==
Addlestone Bourneside
Party	Candidate	Votes	%	±%
Conservative	Peter Waddell	772	70.9	+5.5
Labour	Keith Cliff	317	29.1	+1.9
Majority		455	41.8	+3.6
Turnout		1,089	26.5	−5.2
Conservative hold		Swing		

Addlestone North (2 seats)
Party	Candidate	Votes	%	±%
Conservative	James Broadhead	675		
Conservative	David Parr	649		
Labour	Louise Lavelle	366		
Labour	John Gurney	347		
Turnout		2,037	24.5	−4.2
Conservative hold		Swing		
Conservative hold		Swing		

Chertsey Meads
Party	Candidate	Votes	%	±%
Conservative	Sarah Jacobs	522	47.1	−8.6
Liberal Democrats	Prudence Horne	227	20.5	+4.8
Labour	Bernie Stacey	222	20.0	−8.6
UKIP	Christopher Browne	138	12.4	+12.4
Majority		300	26.6	−0.5
Turnout		1,109	27.0	−1.3
Conservative hold		Swing		

Chertsey St. Ann's
Party	Candidate	Votes	%	±%
Conservative	Dolsie Clarke	544	47.9	−0.2
Labour	Peter Anderson	489	43.0	−8.9
Monster Raving Loony	Keith Collett	103	9.1	+9.1
Majority		55	4.9	
Turnout		1,136	25.5	−2.6
Conservative hold		Swing		

Chertsey South and Row Town
Party	Candidate	Votes	%	±%
Conservative	Claire Grant	997	79.6	
Labour	Kenneth Denyer	255	20.4	
Majority		742	59.2	
Turnout		1,252	31.5	−3.6
Conservative hold		Swing		

Egham Town
Party	Candidate	Votes	%	±%
RIRG	John Ashmore	777	68.8	+10.8
Conservative	Terence McGrath	209	18.5	−9.7
Labour	Keith Thompson	143	12.7	−1.2
Majority		568	50.3	+20.5
Turnout		1,129	25.9	−3.2
RIRG hold		Swing		

Englefield Green East
Party	Candidate	Votes	%	±%
Conservative	Kevin Walmsley	425	60.3	−4.6
Liberal Democrats	Peter Russell	204	28.9	+7.7
Labour	Martin Rudd	76	10.8	−3.2
Majority		221	31.4	−12.3
Turnout		705	17.2	−0.1
Conservative hold		Swing		

Englefield Green West
Party	Candidate	Votes	%	±%
Conservative	Jeffrey Haas	482	54.5	−15.4
Labour	Alexander Beck	153	17.3	−12.8
Liberal Democrats	Ian Heath	139	15.7	+15.7
UKIP	Harold Pearce	111	12.5	+12.5
Majority		329	37.2	−2.6
Turnout		885	21.1	+0.2
Conservative hold		Swing		

Foxhills
Party	Candidate	Votes	%	±%
Conservative	Frances Barden	784	62.5	−12.8
Labour	Peter Kingham	189	15.1	−9.6
Liberal Democrats	Terence Gibbons	184	14.7	+14.7
UKIP	Anthony Micklethwait	98	7.8	+7.8
Majority		595	47.4	−3.2
Turnout		1,255	29.5	−1.0
Conservative hold		Swing		

Hythe
Party	Candidate	Votes	%	±%
Labour	Rodney Pate	475	43.1	−2.0
Conservative	Yvonna Lay	458	41.5	+3.8
Liberal Democrats	Dorian Mead	170	15.4	−1.7
Majority		17	1.6	−5.8
Turnout		1,103	23.1	+4.1
Labour hold		Swing		

New Haw
Party	Candidate	Votes	%	±%
Conservative	John Dean	670	61.5	+3.1
Liberal Democrats	Annie Miller	259	23.8	−4.6
Labour	Angela Gould	161	14.8	+1.6
Majority		411	37.7	+7.7
Turnout		1,090	25.2	−5.7
Conservative hold		Swing		

Thorpe
Party	Candidate	Votes	%	±%
RIRG	Linda Gillham	912	68.5	−3.3
Conservative	Ian Angell	306	23.0	−5.2
Labour	Brenda Head	114	8.6	+8.6
Majority		606	45.5	+1.9
Turnout		1,332	30.4	−0.4
RIRG hold		Swing		

Virginia Water
Party	Candidate	Votes	%	±%
Conservative	Geoffrey Woodger	894	77.9	+1.4
Liberal Democrats	Peter Key	160	13.9	−1.2
Labour	Monica Dowling	94	8.2	−0.2
Majority		734	64.0	+2.6
Turnout		1,148	26.5	−2.6
Conservative hold		Swing		

Woodham
Party	Candidate	Votes	%	±%
Conservative	Florence Angell	866	65.4	−1.9
Liberal Democrats	Janet Cockle	263	19.8	0.0
Labour	George Blair	196	14.8	+1.9
Majority		603	45.6	−1.9
Turnout		1,325	31.3	+0.4
Conservative hold		Swing		
