= 2007 Runnymede Borough Council election =

2007 UK local government election

Results of the 2007 Runnymede Borough Council election

Elections to Runnymede Council were held on 3 May 2007. One third of the council was up for election and the Conservative Party stayed in overall control of the council.

After the election, the composition of the council was:

- Conservative 36
- Runnymede Residents Association 6

== Election result ==
Runnymede local election result 2007
Party	Seats	Gains	Losses	Net gain/loss	Seats %	Votes %	Votes	+/−
Conservative	14	0	0	0	87.5	58.1	12,283	+2.7%
RIRG	2	0	0	0	12.5	9.8	2,075	+1.1%
Labour	0	0	0	0	0	12.4	2,615	-2.9%
Liberal Democrats	0	0	0	0	0	9.9	2,085	-3.8%
UKIP	0	0	0	0	0	8.8	1,863	+3.6%
Independent	0	0	0	0	0	0.9	190	+0.9%
Equal Parenting Alliance	0	0	0	0	0	0.1	17	+0.1%

== Ward results ==
Addlestone Bourneside
Party	Candidate	Votes	%	±%
Conservative	Peter Waddell	965	76.2	+5.1
Labour	Adrian Elston	302	23.8	−5.1
Majority		663	52.4	+10.2
Turnout		1,267	31.3	−2.7
Conservative hold		Swing		

Addlestone North
Party	Candidate	Votes	%	±%
Conservative	James Broadhead	715	59.5	−0.3
Labour	Deborah Greenwood	187	15.6	−6.8
Liberal Democrats	Peter Key	157	13.1	−4.8
UKIP	Diana Bannister	126	10.5	+10.5
Equal Parenting Alliance	Keith Collett	17	1.4	+1.4
Majority		528	43.9	+6.5
Turnout		1,202	28.7	−2.6
Conservative hold		Swing		

Chertsey Meads
Party	Candidate	Votes	%	±%
Conservative	Derek Cotty	809	57.8	+4.4
UKIP	Christopher Browne	249	17.8	−0.4
Labour	Bernie Stacey	208	14.9	−0.8
Liberal Democrats	Ross Belson	134	9.6	−3.1
Majority		560	40.0	+4.8
Turnout		1,400	33.4	−0.1
Conservative hold		Swing		

Chertsey St.Ann's
Party	Candidate	Votes	%	±%
Conservative	Dolsie Clarke	708	49.4	−10.1
Labour	Paul Greenwood	511	35.7	−4.8
UKIP	Robert Belobaba	214	14.9	+14.9
Majority		197	13.7	−5.3
Turnout		1,433	31.4	−0.9
Conservative hold		Swing		

Chertsey South and Row Town
Party	Candidate	Votes	%	±%
Conservative	Claire Gant	907	63.9	−4.3
UKIP	Gillian Ellis	282	19.9	+19.9
Labour	Peter Kingham	230	16.2	+2.5
Majority		625	44.0	−6.1
Turnout		1,419	35.5	−2.7
Conservative hold		Swing		

Egham Town
Party	Candidate	Votes	%	±%
RIRG	John Ashmore	720	54.4	−9.3
Conservative	Christopher Chapman	468	35.3	+10.2
Labour	Keith Thompson	136	10.3	−0.9
Majority		252	19.1	−19.5
Turnout		1,324	32.9	+0.4
RIRG hold		Swing		

Englefield Green East
Party	Candidate	Votes	%	±%
Conservative	Daniel Hamilton	492	54.1	
Liberal Democrats	James Whiteley	324	35.6	
UKIP	Rosemary Browne	93	10.2	
Majority		168	18.5	
Turnout		909	23.9	−1.2
Conservative hold		Swing		

Englefield Green West
Party	Candidate	Votes	%	±%
Conservative	Jack Perschke	450	42.5	−14.2
UKIP	Anthony Micklethwaite	272	25.7	+14.1
Independent	Jenny Gould	190	17.9	+17.9
Liberal Democrats	Ian Heath	147	13.9	−3.8
Majority		178	16.8	−22.2
Turnout		1,059	32.6	+1.0
Conservative hold		Swing		

Foxhills
Party	Candidate	Votes	%	±%
Conservative	Frances Barden	859	60.8	+7.0
UKIP	Leon Mullett	195	13.8	+3.0
Liberal Democrats	Nancy Palm	191	13.5	+0.8
Labour	John Gurney	167	11.8	−3.3
Majority		664	47.0	+8.3
Turnout		1,412	35.2	−1.5
Conservative hold		Swing		

Hythe
Party	Candidate	Votes	%	±%
Conservative	Ian Angell	672	53.9	
Labour	David Bell	359	28.8	
UKIP	Guy Leven-Torres	216	17.3	
Majority		323	25.1	
Turnout		1,247	27.1	−2.8
Conservative hold		Swing		

New Haw
Party	Candidate	Votes	%	±%
Conservative	Nik Stewart	852	63.9	−15.5
Liberal Democrats	Jennifer Coulon	482	36.1	+15.5
Majority		370	27.8	−31.0
Turnout		1,334	31.7	+0.4
Conservative hold		Swing		

Thorpe
Party	Candidate	Votes	%	±%
RIRG	Linda Gillham	1,068	67.9	+3.7
Conservative	Nicholas Wase-Rogers	400	25.4	−2.0
Labour	Peter Moore	104	6.6	−1.8
Majority		668	42.5	+5.7
Turnout		1,572	36.8	−1.4
RIRG hold		Swing		

Virginia Water (2)
Party	Candidate	Votes	%	±%
Conservative	Geoffrey Woodger	1,006		
Conservative	Andrew Mills	1,002		
RIRG	Margaret Harnden	287		
Liberal Democrats	Christine Key	261		
UKIP	John Gynn	216		
Turnout		2,772	35.7	−2.1
Conservative hold		Swing		
Conservative hold		Swing		

Woodham (2)
Party	Candidate	Votes	%	±%
Conservative	Florence Angell	1,030		
Conservative	Robert Jones	948		
Liberal Democrats	Janet Cockle	389		
Labour	George Blair	215		
Labour	Brenda Head	196		
Turnout		2,778	36.3	−2.3
Conservative hold		Swing		
Conservative hold		Swing		
