= Senior Citizens Party =

Former political party in the United Kingdom

- Abbreviation: SCP
- Leader: Grahame Leon-Smith
- Founder: Grahame Leon-Smith; Terry Pattinson
- Founded: 22 January 2004; 22 years ago
- Dissolved: 5 March 2014; 12 years ago
- Merged into: UKIP
- Headquarters: Ottershaw, Surrey
- Membership (2009): 4,000
- Colors: Maroon; Yellow

Website
- Archived Website

The Senior Citizens Party was a political party in the United Kingdom that operated from its foundation in 2004 until it merged with UKIP in 2014. It focused on the rights of senior citizens (people over the age of 50).

== History ==
=== Foundation ===
The party was founded in January 2004 by Grahame Leon-Smith and Terry Pattinson. They claim that they had previously been lifelong Conservative and Labour Party members respectively, with Leon-Smith serving as a councillor for 6 years, but had become disillusioned by the breaking of the link between pensions and average earnings by the Conservatives and Labour's failure to restore it. They also campaigned against council tax, proposing a local income tax, and campaign for free personal care for the elderly, free off-peak travel, and free television licences.

=== Electoral Activity ===
The party won 42,861 votes in the South East in the 2004 European Parliament election.

The party originally endorsed a "yes" vote in the 2004 North East England devolution referendum, but switched to endorsing "no" due to the plan to abolish two-tier local government in County Durham and Northumberland if the referendum succeeded.

They stood candidates against Tony Blair and Michael Howard in the 2005 UK general election. Leon-Smith received 151 votes (0.3%) in Folkestone and Hythe, and Pattinson received 97 votes (0.2%) in Sedgefield. In the run up to the 2005 General Election the Senior Citizens Party had meetings discussing an electoral alliance with the English Democrats.

Leon-Smith and Pattinson stood for the party in the 2006 Runnymede Borough Council election. They both came last, receiving 7.6% and 9% of the vote respectively.

=== Deregistration and Merger with UKIP ===
The party was deregistered with the Electoral Commission on 20 April 2010.

The accounts filed for their final year as a registered party, 2009, indicate that they had "approximately 4,000 members and associate members". The annual membership fee was £12, but associate members did not pay anything. The ratio of full to associate members was not specified.

The Senior Citizens Party merged with UKIP in March 2014, as announced by Leon-Smith at the UKIP conference.

== See also ==
- Scottish Senior Citizens Unity Party
