= 2019 Runnymede Borough Council election =

2019 UK local government election

← 2018	2 May 2019	2021 →

All 41 seats in the Runnymede Borough Council 21 seats needed for a majority
- Registered: 60,686
- Turnout: 31.0%
	First party	Second party	Third party
Leader	Nick Prescot	Linda Gillham	Don Whyte
Party	Conservative	RIRG	Liberal Democrats
Leader since	2017		2019
Leader's seat	Englefield Green West	Thorpe	Longcross, Lyne and Chertsey South
Last election	33	6	0
Seats won	26	6	3
Seat change	▼7	Steady	▲3
Popular vote	22,395	5,814	3,590
Percentage	47.0%	12.2%	7.6%
	Fourth party	Fifth party
Leader	Arran Neathey	Michael Brierley
Party	Labour	Green
Leader since	2019	2019
Leader's seat	Egham Hythe	Addlestone North
Last election	1	0
Seats won	2	1
Seat change	▲1	▲1
Popular vote	9,482	1,623
Percentage	19.9%	3.4%
- Results of the 2019 Runnymede Borough Council election
Council control before election
Conservative
Council control after election
Conservative

Elections for Runnymede Borough Council took place on 2 May 2019 alongside nationwide local elections. Due to changes to the ward boundaries, all 41 seats on the Council were up for election. The Conservative Party lost seats, but retained its majority on the council.

== Results summary ==
Runnymede Borough Council Election 2019
Party	Candidates						Votes		
Party	Stood	Elected	Gained	Unseated	Net	% of total	%	No.	Net %
Conservative	41	26	0	7	▼7	63.4	47.0	22,395	
Labour Co-op	30	2	1	0	▲1	4.9	19.9	9,482	
RIRG	6	6	0	0	Steady	14.6	12.2	5,814	
Liberal Democrats	9	3	3	0	▲3	7.3	7.6	3,590	
Independent	5	3	2	0	▲2	7.3	6.4	3,029	
UKIP	7	0	0	0	Steady	0.0	3.7	1,743	
Green	4	1	1	0	▲1	2.4	3.4	1,623	

== Ward results ==
=== Addlestone North ===
Addlestone North
Party	Candidate	Votes	%	±%
Conservative	James Broadhead	414	33.96	
Green	Michael Robert Brierley	408	33.47	
Independent	Stewart Mark Mackay	408	33.47	
Conservative	David William Parr	388	31.83	
Conservative	Peter James Waddell	330	27.07	
Labour Co-op	Anne Emerson-Miller	278	22.81	
Independent	Keith David Collett	274	22.48	
Liberal Democrats	Stuart Andrew Lawrence	263	21.58	
Labour Co-op	Adrian Anthony Elston	252	20.67	
Labour Co-op	Michael William Scott	205	16.82	
Turnout				
Conservative hold		Swing		
Green gain from Conservative		Swing		
Independent gain from Conservative		Swing		

=== Addlestone South ===
Addlestone South
Party	Candidate	Votes	%	±%
Conservative	Peter Snow	690	48.02	
Conservative	Jonathan James Wilson	658	45.79	
Conservative	John Raymond Furey	655	45.58	
Labour Co-op	June Patricia Tilbury	465	32.36	
Labour Co-op	Noel Martin Daniels	416	28.95	
Labour Co-op	Gavin Tennent Morrison	411	28.60	
UKIP	James Turner	313	21.78	
Turnout				
Conservative hold		Swing		
Conservative hold		Swing		
Conservative hold		Swing		

=== Chertsey Riverside ===
Chertsey Riverside
Party	Candidate	Votes	%	±%
Conservative	Derek Alban Cotty	543	48.74	
Conservative	Dolsie Vaughan Clarke	540	48.47	
Conservative	Stephen Luke Dennett	534	47.94	
Liberal Democrats	Annabel Mary Jones	356	31.96	
Labour Co-op	Tina Miranda Jenkins	334	29.98	
Labour Co-op	Joseph Vincent Blake	288	25.85	
Labour Co-op	Peter Kingham	263	23.61	
Turnout				
Conservative hold		Swing		
Conservative hold		Swing		
Conservative hold		Swing		

=== Chertsey St Ann's ===
Chertsey St Ann's
Party	Candidate	Votes	%	±%
Conservative	Mark Gordon Nuti	675	51.06	
Conservative	Richard Joseph Edis	601	45.46	
Conservative	Myles Lee Willingale	553	41.83	
Labour Co-op	Phillip James Martin	384	29.05	
Liberal Democrats	Kevin Thomas Lee	363	27.46	
Labour Co-op	Edmund Alan Moore	333	25.19	
Labour Co-op	Bernie Charles Stacey	324	24.51	
Turnout				
Conservative hold		Swing		
Conservative hold		Swing		
Conservative hold		Swing		

=== Egham Hythe ===
Egham Hythe
Party	Candidate	Votes	%	±%
Labour Co-op	Robert Ashley King	598	46.14	
Conservative	Mark Raymond Adams	585	45.14	
Labour Co-op	Arran Richard Neathey	574	44.29	
Conservative	Yvonna Pia Lay	567	43.75	
Conservative	Gillian Warner	563	43.44	
Labour Co-op	Adam Feroze Manzoor Abbas	557	42.98	
Turnout				
Labour Co-op hold		Swing		
Conservative hold		Swing		
Labour Co-op gain from Conservative		Swing		

=== Egham Town ===
Egham Town
Party	Candidate	Votes	%	±%
RIRG	Isabel Alice Mullens	1,031	66.73	
RIRG	Alan Alderson	1,027	66.47	
RIRG	Brian Anthony Clarke	900	58.25	
Conservative	David Coen	358	23.17	
Conservative	Maureen Catherine Elizabeth Furey	258	16.70	
Labour Co-op	Jacqueline Mary Fletcher	232	15.02	
Conservative	David Calum James MacPhee	218	14.11	
Labour Co-op	Katie Violet Regardsoe	207	13.40	
Labour Co-op	William Keith Heal	205	13.27	
Turnout				
RIRG hold		Swing		
RIRG hold		Swing		
RIRG hold		Swing		

=== Englefield Green East ===
Englefield Green East
Party	Candidate	Votes	%	±%
Conservative	Marisa Natalia Heath	455	50.56	
Conservative	Japneet Kaur Sohi	346	38.44	
Independent	David John Knight	254	28.22	
Liberal Democrats	Ian David Heath	215	23.89	
Labour Co-op	Dominic John Breen	200	22.22	
Labour Co-op	William Christopher Ian Hayes	197	21.89	
Turnout				
Conservative hold		Swing		
Conservative hold		Swing		

=== Englefield Green West ===
Englefield Green West
Party	Candidate	Votes	%	±%
Conservative	Nigel Michael King	497	44.10	
Conservative	Michael Touros Kusneraitis	481	42.68	
Conservative	Nicholas Hugh Prescot	437	38.78	
Green	Andrea Berardi	405	35.94	
Labour Co-op	Abby Louise King	337	29.90	
Labour Co-op	James Rhys Davies	299	26.53	
Labour Co-op	Jack Eugeniusz Stokes	203	18.01	
UKIP	Jason Doig Myles	200	17.75	
Turnout				
Conservative hold		Swing		
Conservative hold		Swing		
Conservative hold		Swing		

=== Longcross, Lyne and Chertsey South ===
Longcross, Lyne and Chertsey South
Party	Candidate	Votes	%	±%
Liberal Democrats	Donald James Whyte	539	53.21	
Liberal Democrats	Sylvia Jane Whyte	526	41.36	
Liberal Democrats	Theresa Lois Burton	419	32.80	
Conservative	Robert Ian Bromley	319	31.49	
Conservative	Angela Shepperdson	290	28.63	
Conservative	John Gerard Kavanagh	254	25.07	
Green	Benjamin Timothy George Smith	171	16.88	
UKIP	Anthony Robert Micklethwait	155	15.30	
UKIP	Christopher David Butcher	150	14.81	
Turnout				
Liberal Democrats gain from Conservative		Swing		
Liberal Democrats gain from Conservative		Swing		
Liberal Democrats gain from Conservative		Swing		

=== New Haw ===
New Haw
Party	Candidate	Votes	%	±%
Conservative	Jacqueline Mary Gracey	777	56.43	
Conservative	Mark James Maddox	737	53.52	
Conservative	Stephen David Walsh	679	49.31	
Liberal Democrats	Jennifer Jane Coulon	551	40.01	
Labour Co-op	James Richard Mullett	362	26.29	
Turnout				
Conservative hold		Swing		
Conservative hold		Swing		
Conservative hold		Swing		

=== Ottershaw ===
Ottershaw
Party	Candidate	Votes	%	±%
Independent	John Olorenshaw	1,047	58.56	
Independent	Malcolm David Cressey	1,046	58.50	
Conservative	Iftikhar Chaudhri	517	28.91	
Conservative	Neill William Rubidge	503	28.13	
Conservative	Shannon Kerry Niomi Saise-Marshall	494	27.63	
UKIP	Graham Frank Wood	387	21.46	
Liberal Democrats	Liberal Democrats	358	20.02	
Labour	John Colin Gurney	273	15.27	
Turnout				
Independent hold		Swing		
Independent gain from Conservative		Swing		
Conservative hold		Swing		

=== Thorpe ===
Thorpe
Party	Candidate	Votes	%	±%
RIRG	Elaine Gill	990	61.68	
RIRG	Linda Mary Gillham	946	58.94	
RIRG	Margaret Theresa Harnden	920	57.32	
Conservative	Nicholas John Wase-Rogers	327	20.37	
Conservative	Charles Michael Collins	325	20.25	
Conservative	June Dorothy Seager	301	18.75	
UKIP	William Albert Bruno	216	13.46	
Labour Co-op	Nayier Latif Ahmad	157	9.78	
Labour Co-op	Joseph William Harry Royal	156	9.72	
Turnout				
RIRG hold		Swing		
RIRG hold		Swing		
RIRG hold		Swing		

=== Virginia Water ===
Virginia Water
Party	Candidate	Votes	%	±%
Conservative	Christopher Paul Howorth	937	68.75	
Conservative	Jonathan Hulley	927	68.01	
Conservative	Parshotam Singh Sohi	828	60.75	
Labour Co-op	James Lloyd Neal	321	23.55	
Labour Co-op	Maliha Malika Reza	284	20.84	
Turnout				
Conservative hold		Swing		
Conservative hold		Swing		
Conservative hold		Swing		

=== Woodham and Rowtown ===
Woodham and Rowtown
Party	Candidate	Votes	%	±%
Conservative	Thomas James Francis Gracey	981	56.51	
Conservative	David Ewan Anderson-Bassey	939	54.09	
Conservative	Scott Alderson Lewis	914	52.65	
Green	Gordon George William Matthews	639	36.81	
Labour Co-op	Jessica Abigail Weeds	367	21.14	
UKIP	Valerie Ann Woodhouse	322	18.55	
Turnout				
Conservative hold		Swing		
Conservative hold		Swing		
Conservative hold		Swing		
