= 2018 Runnymede Borough Council election =

2018 UK local government election

← 2016	3 May 2018	2019 →

16 of the 42 seats for the Runnymede Borough Council 22 seats needed for a majority
	First party	Second party
	Con	Res
Leader	Nick Prescot	Linda Gillham
Party	Conservative	RIRG
Leader since	2017	2018
Leader's seat	Englefield Green West	Thorpe
Last election	26	6
Seats before	36	6
Seats won	11	2
Seats after	33	6
Seat change	▼3	Steady
Popular vote	8,893	1,954
Percentage	49.3%	9.4%
	Third party	Fourth party
	Ind	Lab
Leader	Malcolm Cressey	Fiona Dent
Party	Independent	Labour
Leader since	2018	2018
Leader's seat	Foxhills	Egham Hythe
Last election	0	0
Seats before	0	0
Seats won	2	1
Seats after	2	1
Seat change	▲2	▲1
Popular vote	1,350	4,580
Percentage	6.5%	22.0%
- Map of the parties of the councillors representing each of the wards following the election. Colours denote the party, as shown in the main table of results.
Leader before election
Nick Prescot
Conservative
Leader after election
Nick Prescot
Conservative

Elections for Runnymede Borough Council took place on 3 May 2018 alongside nationwide local elections. A third of the council was up for election, and the Conservatives retained control. Labour won their first seat on the council for over 20 years.

== Election results ==
Runnymede Borough Council Election 2018
Party	This election			Full council			This election		
Party	Seats	Net	Seats %	Other	Total	Total %	Votes	Votes %	+/−
Conservative	11	▼3	68.8	22	33	78.6	10,266	49.3	
RIRG	2	Steady	12.5	4	6	14.3	1,954	9.4	
Independent	2	▲2	12.5	0	2	4.8	1,783	8.6	
Labour	1	▲1	6.3	0	1	2.4	4,580	22.0	
Liberal Democrats	0	Steady	7.1	0	0	7.3	1,328	6.4	
UKIP	0	Steady	0	0	0	0	582	2.8	
Green	1	▲1	7.1	0	1	2.4	345	1.7	

== Ward results ==
=== Addlestone Bourneside ===
Addlestone Bourneside
Party	Candidate	Votes	%	±%
Conservative	John Raymond Furey	739	52.60	−4.76
Labour	June Patricia Tilbury	498	35.44	+5.20
Liberal Democrats	Chelsea Katherine Whyte	168	11.96	+0.97
Turnout		1,414	32.68	
Conservative hold		Swing		

=== Addlestone North ===
Addlestone North
Party	Candidate	Votes	%	±%
Conservative	David William Parr	779	63.80	+3.98
Labour	Michael William Scott	442	36.20	−3.98
Turnout		1,236	26.03	
Conservative hold		Swing		

=== Chertsey Meads ===
Chertsey Meads
Party	Candidate	Votes	%	±%
Conservative	Stephen Luke Dennett	900	66.08	+13.80
Labour	Philip Martin	462	33.92	+11.19
Turnout		1,386	30.09	
Conservative hold		Swing		

=== Chertsey South and Row Town ===
Chertsey South and Row Town
Party	Candidate	Votes	%	±%
Conservative	Peter Snow	723	48.56	−7.91
Conservative	Neil William Rubidge	719	48.29	−8.18
Green	Richard George Miller	345	23.17	−1.65
Labour	James Douglas Scott	249	16.82	−1.09
Liberal Democrats	Sylvia Jane Whyte	246	16.52	N/A
UKIP	Graham Frank Wood	144	9.67	N/A
Turnout		1,493	32.13	
Conservative hold		Swing		
Conservative hold		Swing		

=== Chertsey St Ann's ===
Chertsey St Ann's
Party	Candidate	Votes	%	±%
Conservative	Richard Joseph Edis	736	49.10	+7.17
Labour	Arran Richard Neathey	481	32.09	+4.14
Liberal Democrats	Kevin Thomas Lee	158	10.54	+2.92
UKIP	William Albert Bruno	124	8.27	−13.74
Turnout		1,513	31.27	
Conservative hold		Swing		

=== Egham Hythe ===
Egham Hythe
Party	Candidate	Votes	%	±%
Labour	Fiona Robertson Dent	682	53.12	+23.13
Conservative	Jonathan James Wilson	602	46.88	+7.97
Turnout		1,299	27.50	
Labour gain from Conservative		Swing		

=== Egham Town ===
Egham Town
Party	Candidate	Votes	%	±%
RIRG	Alan Alderson	674	56.21	−5.86
Conservative	Charles Stewart Prescott	269	22.44	−0.08
Labour	William Keith Heal	256	21.35	+6.26
Turnout		1,202	30.48	
RIRG hold		Swing		

=== Englefield Green East ===
Englefield Green East
Party	Candidate	Votes	%	±%
Conservative	Peter John Taylor	411	53.59	−11.60
Labour	Robert Ashley King	199	25.95	+5.04
Liberal Democrats	Nina Immink	157	20.47	+7.30
Turnout		770	34.09	
Conservative hold		Swing		

=== Englefield Green West ===
Englefield Green West
Party	Candidate	Votes	%	±%
Conservative	Michael Touros Kusneraitis	389	41.25	−0.95
Labour	Abby Louise King	306	32.45	+2.62
RIRG	Annabel Rose Tresilian Clarke	168	17.82	N/A
UKIP	David Charles Hunt	80	8.48	−18.92
Turnout		946	29.70	
Conservative hold		Swing		

=== Foxhills ===
Foxhills
Party	Candidate	Votes	%	±%
Independent	Malcolm David Cressey	725	42.30	N/A
Independent	Angela Shepperdson	625	36.46	N/A
Conservative	Emma Georgina Bancroft	564	32.91	−20.91
Conservative	David Calum James MacPhee	489	28.53	−25.29
Liberal Democrats	Don Whyte	402	23.45	N/A
Labour	John Colin Gurney	204	11.90	−4.42
UKIP	Toby Micklethwait	134	7.82	−21.76
Turnout		1,716	41.72	
Independent gain from Conservative		Swing		
Independent gain from Conservative		Swing		

=== New Haw ===
New Haw
Party	Candidate	Votes	%	±%
Conservative	Mark James Maddox	725	62.61	+0.98
Labour	James Richard Mullett	236	20.38	+1.48
Liberal Democrats	Jennifer Jane Coulon	197	17.01	−1.40
Turnout		1,166	26.78	
Conservative hold		Swing		

=== Thorpe ===
Thorpe
Party	Candidate	Votes	%	±%
RIRG	Margaret Theresa Harnden	827	59.80	+3.63
Conservative	Christian Thomas Jepson Egglishaw	396	28.63	+17.59
Labour	Jack Eugeniusz Stokes	160	11.57	+3.59
Turnout		1,389	32.86	
RIRG hold		Swing		

=== Virginia Water ===
Virginia Water
Party	Candidate	Votes	%	±%
Conservative	Parshotam Singh Sohi	738	47.31	−9.07
Independent	Alex Balkan	433	27.76	N/A
RIRG	Brian Anthony Clarke	285	18.27	−11.68
Labour	James Lloyd Neal	104	6.67	N/A
Turnout		1,563	36.85	
Conservative hold		Swing		

=== Woodham ===
Woodham
Party	Candidate	Votes	%	±%
Conservative	David Ewan Anderson-Bassey	1,087	73.05	+5.41
Labour	Anne Marie Emerson-Miller	301	20.23	N/A
UKIP	Valerie Ann Woodhouse	100	6.72	−17.45
Turnout		1,502	35.32	
Conservative hold		Swing		
