= 2002 Runnymede Borough Council election =

2002 UK local government election

Results of the 2002 Runnymede Borough Council election

Elections to Runnymede Council were held on 2 May 2002. One third of the council was up for election and the Conservative Party stayed in overall control of the council.

After the election, the composition of the council was:

- Conservative: 32
- Runnymede Independent Residents Group: 6
- Labour: 4

== Election result ==
Runnymede local election result 2002
| Party | Seats | Gains | Losses | Net gain/loss | Seats % | Votes % | Votes | +/− |
|---|---|---|---|---|---|---|---|---|
| Conservative | 12 | 0 | 1 | -1 | 75.0 | 59.8 | 11,619 | +0.5% |
| Labour | 2 | 1 | 0 | +1 | 12.5 | 22.7 | 4,414 | +1.5% |
| RIRG | 2 | 0 | 0 | 0 | 12.5 | 8.8 | 1,707 | -1.0% |
| Liberal Democrats | 0 | 0 | 0 | 0 | 0 | 8.2 | 1,589 | -0.7% |
| Independent | 0 | 0 | 0 | 0 | 0 | 0.5 | 98 | -0.4% |

== Ward results ==
Addlestone Bourneside
| Party | Candidate | Votes | % | ±% |
|---|---|---|---|---|
| Conservative | John Furey | 877 | 65.4 | |
| Labour | Bernie Stacey | 365 | 27.2 | |
| Independent | Colin Stephens | 98 | 7.3 | |
| Majority | | 512 | 38.2 | |
| Turnout | | 1,340 | 31.7 | −0.9 |
| Conservative hold | | Swing | | |

Addlestone North
| Party | Candidate | Votes | % | ±% |
|---|---|---|---|---|
| Conservative | Graham Thomas | 780 | 62.6 | |
| Labour | Michael Pear | 466 | 37.4 | |
| Majority | | 314 | 25.2 | |
| Turnout | | 1,246 | 28.7 | −3.7 |
| Conservative hold | | Swing | | |

Chertsey Meads
| Party | Candidate | Votes | % | ±% |
|---|---|---|---|---|
| Conservative | Paul Tuley | 672 | 55.7 | |
| Labour | Peter Anderson | 345 | 28.6 | |
| Liberal Democrats | Derek Weston | 189 | 15.7 | |
| Majority | | 327 | 27.1 | |
| Turnout | | 1,206 | 28.3 | −1.7 |
| Conservative hold | | Swing | | |

Chertsey St.Ann's
| Party | Candidate | Votes | % | ±% |
|---|---|---|---|---|
| Labour | Paul Greenwood | 632 | 51.9 | |
| Conservative | Dolsie Clarke | 586 | 48.1 | |
| Majority | | 46 | 3.8 | |
| Turnout | | 1,218 | 28.1 | +2.7 |
| Labour gain from Conservative | | Swing | | |

Chertsey South and Row Town (3)
| Party | Candidate | Votes | % | ±% |
|---|---|---|---|---|
| Conservative | Anthony Davis | 974 | | |
| Conservative | John Edwards | 961 | | |
| Conservative | Claire Grant | 957 | | |
| Labour | Kenneth Denyer | 330 | | |
| Labour | Sheila Pear | 289 | | |
| Liberal Democrats | Geoffrey Pyle | 249 | | |
| Labour | Ian Warner | 236 | | |
| Turnout | | 3,996 | 35.1 | +0.5 |
| Conservative hold | | Swing | | |
| Conservative hold | | Swing | | |
| Conservative hold | | Swing | | |

Egham Town
| Party | Candidate | Votes | % | ±% |
|---|---|---|---|---|
| RIRG | Alan Alderson | 745 | 58.0 | |
| Conservative | Andrew Sissons | 362 | 28.2 | |
| Labour | Monica Dowling | 178 | 13.9 | |
| Majority | | 383 | 29.8 | |
| Turnout | | 1,285 | 29.1 | +1.8 |
| RIRG hold | | Swing | | |

Englefield Green East
| Party | Candidate | Votes | % | ±% |
|---|---|---|---|---|
| Conservative | Niall Thewlis | 506 | 64.9 | |
| Liberal Democrats | Ian Heath | 165 | 21.2 | |
| Labour | Martin Rudd | 109 | 14.0 | |
| Majority | | 341 | 43.7 | |
| Turnout | | 780 | 17.3 | −2.9 |
| Conservative hold | | Swing | | |

Englefield Green West
| Party | Candidate | Votes | % | ±% |
|---|---|---|---|---|
| Conservative | Carole Jones | 631 | 69.9 | |
| Labour | Peter Kingham | 272 | 30.1 | |
| Majority | | 359 | 39.8 | |
| Turnout | | 903 | 20.9 | −6.4 |
| Conservative hold | | Swing | | |

Foxhills
| Party | Candidate | Votes | % | ±% |
|---|---|---|---|---|
| Conservative | Roger Habgood | 999 | 75.3 | |
| Labour | Adrian Elston | 327 | 24.7 | |
| Majority | | 672 | 50.6 | |
| Turnout | | 1,326 | 30.5 | +3.5 |
| Conservative hold | | Swing | | |

Hythe
| Party | Candidate | Votes | % | ±% |
|---|---|---|---|---|
| Labour | Robert Ray | 414 | 45.1 | |
| Conservative | Nigel Saul | 346 | 37.7 | |
| Liberal Democrats | Dorian Mead | 157 | 17.1 | |
| Majority | | 68 | 7.4 | |
| Turnout | | 917 | 19.0 | −0.7 |
| Labour hold | | Swing | | |

New Haw
| Party | Candidate | Votes | % | ±% |
|---|---|---|---|---|
| Conservative | Christopher Knight | 799 | 58.4 | |
| Liberal Democrats | Kenneth Graham | 388 | 28.4 | |
| Labour | Angela Gould | 181 | 13.2 | |
| Majority | | 411 | 30.0 | |
| Turnout | | 1,368 | 30.9 | −1.4 |
| Conservative hold | | Swing | | |

Thorpe
| Party | Candidate | Votes | % | ±% |
|---|---|---|---|---|
| RIRG | Brian Relph | 962 | 71.8 | |
| Conservative | Ian Angell | 377 | 28.2 | |
| Majority | | 585 | 43.6 | |
| Turnout | | 1,339 | 30.8 | +0.5 |
| RIRG hold | | Swing | | |

Virginia Water
| Party | Candidate | Votes | % | ±% |
|---|---|---|---|---|
| Conservative | John Whiteley | 900 | 76.5 | |
| Liberal Democrats | Peter Key | 178 | 15.1 | |
| Labour | William Heal | 99 | 8.4 | |
| Majority | | 722 | 61.4 | |
| Turnout | | 1,177 | 28.1 | −3.9 |
| Conservative hold | | Swing | | |

Woodham
| Party | Candidate | Votes | % | ±% |
|---|---|---|---|---|
| Conservative | Michael Brown | 892 | 67.3 | |
| Liberal Democrats | Annie Miller | 263 | 19.8 | |
| Labour | John Gurney | 171 | 12.9 | |
| Majority | | 629 | 47.5 | |
| Turnout | | 1,326 | 30.9 | −5.9 |
| Conservative hold | | Swing | | |
