= 2015 Runnymede Borough Council election =

2015 UK local government election

Results of the 2015 Runnymede Borough Council election

The 2015 Runnymede Borough Council election took place on 7 May 2015 to elect one third of members to Runnymede Borough Council in England. The election coincided with other local elections held simultaneously with a General Election and resulted in increased turnout compared to the election four years before. In Addlestone North a by-election added to seats vacant. All currently drawn wards of the United Kingdom in this area are three-member, with the different members' seats contested three years out of four.

== Results ==
Conservatives gained a seat, adding to councillors within the group with overall control of the Council.

Runnymede Borough Council Election, 2015
Party	Seats	Gains	Losses	Net gain/loss	Seats %	Votes %	Votes	+/−
Conservative	36	1	0	+1	86	52	21860	
RIRG	6	0	0	0	14	7	2886	
Labour	0	0	0	0	0	20	8313	
UKIP	0	0	1	-1	0	17	7490	
Green	0	0	0	0	0	2	909	
Liberal Democrats	0	0	0	0	0	1	220	

=== Ward by ward ===
Addlestone Bourneside
Party	Candidate	Votes	%	±%
Conservative	Peter Waddell	1424		
UKIP	Paul Stevens	581		
Labour	June Tilbury	570		
Green	Susie Maguire	245		
Majority				
Turnout				
Conservative hold		Swing		

Addlestone North (two seats)
Party	Candidate	Votes	%	±%
Conservative	Jim Broadhead	1683		
Conservative	Stewart Mackay	1193		
Labour	David Bell	819		
UKIP	Grahame Leon-Smith	746		
Labour	Doug Scott	652		
Majority				
Turnout				
Conservative hold		Swing		
Conservative hold		Swing		

Chertsey Meads
Party	Candidate	Votes	%	±%
Conservative	Derek Cotty	1681		
Labour	Bernie Stacey	667		
UKIP	Chris Butcher	624		
Majority				
Turnout				
Conservative hold		Swing		

Chertsey South and Row Town
Party	Candidate	Votes	%	±%
Conservative	Terry Dicks	1652		
UKIP	Graham Wood	685		
Labour	Martin Philip	612		
Majority				
Turnout				
Conservative hold		Swing		

Chertsey St Ann's
Party	Candidate	Votes	%	±%
Conservative	Dolsie Clarke	1516		
Labour	Arran Neathey	782		
UKIP	Bill Bruno	709		
Majority				
Turnout				
Conservative hold		Swing		

Egham Hythe
Party	Candidate	Votes	%	±%
Conservative	Gill Warner	1498		
Labour	Robert King	820		
UKIP	Luke Smith	627		
Majority				
Turnout				
Conservative hold		Swing		

Egham Town
Party	Candidate	Votes	%	±%
RIRG	John Ashmore	1291		
Conservative	Sam Walker	977		
Labour	Tae Kim	512		
Majority				
Turnout				
RIRG hold		Swing		

Englefield Green East
Party	Candidate	Votes	%	±%
Conservative	Japneet Sohi	1087		
Green	Frederick Hoareau	396		
Labour	Benjamin Tozer	382		
UKIP	Adrian Girling	195		
Majority				
Turnout				
Conservative hold		Swing		

Englefield Green West
Party	Candidate	Votes	%	±%
Conservative	Nicholas Prescot	1038		
UKIP	David Hunt	477		
Labour	Helen Jewell	421		
Green	Glenn Mealing	268		
Majority				
Turnout				
Conservative hold		Swing		

Foxhills
Party	Candidate	Votes	%	±%
Conservative	Dannielle Khalique	1612		
UKIP	Christopher Browne	753		
Labour	John Gurney	586		
Majority				
Turnout				
Conservative gain from UKIP		Swing		

New Haw Foxhills
Party	Candidate	Votes	%	±%
Conservative	Jacqui Gracey	1725		
UKIP	Delphine Palmowski	623		
Labour	Anne Emerson	380		
Liberal Democrats	Jennifer Coulon	220		
Majority				
Turnout				
Conservative hold		Swing		

Thorpe
Party	Candidate	Votes	%	±%
RIRG	Linda Gillham	1192		
Conservative	Mark Peace	917		
UKIP	Steve Gynn	615		
Labour	James Hale	295		
Majority				
Turnout				
RIRG hold		Swing		

Virginia Water
Party	Candidate	Votes	%	±%
Conservative	Nicholas Wase-Rogers	1880		
RIRG	Brian Clarke	403		
UKIP	Ross Thompson	321		
Labour	Keith Heal	280		
Majority				
Turnout				
Conservative hold		Swing		

Woodham
Party	Candidate	Votes	%	±%
Conservative	Gail Kingerley	1977		
Labour	Scott Carmen	535		
UKIP	Val Woodhouse	534		
Majority				
Turnout				
Conservative hold		Swing		
