= 2024 Runnymede Borough Council election =

2024 English Local election

- 2 May 2024

14 out of 41 seats to Runnymede Borough Council 21 seats needed for a majority
- Registered: 57,518
- Turnout: 18,320 (31.9%, ▼0.8 pp)

	First party	Second party	Third party
Leader	Robert King	Tom Gracey	Don Whyte
Party	Labour	Conservative	Liberal Democrats
Leader since	2021	2022	2019
Leader's seat	Egham Hythe	Egham Hythe	Longcross, Lyne and Chertsey South
Last election	2 seats, 21.7%	5 seats, 36.9%	2 seats, 19.2%
Seats before	4	19	4
Seats won	4	3	3
Seats after	8	13	6
Seat change	▲4	▼7	▲2
Popular vote	4,298	7,173	3,962
Percentage	21.7%	36.3%	20.0%
Swing	0.0 pp	▼0.6 pp	▲0.8 pp
	Fourth party	Fifth party	Sixth party
Leader	Linda Gillham	Steve Ringham	Bob Bromley
Party	RIRG	Green	Reform
Leader since	2023	2022	2024
Leader's seat	Thorpe	Addlestone North	Addlestone North (Defeated standing in Englefield Green West)
Last election	2 seats, 8.5%	1 seat, 6.5%	0 seats, 0.4%
Seats before	6	2	1
Seats won	2	1	0
Seats after	6	3	0
Seat change	0	▲1	0
Popular vote	1,400	1,438	252
Percentage	7.1%	7.3%	1.3%
Swing	▼1.4 pp	▲0.8 pp	▲0.9 pp
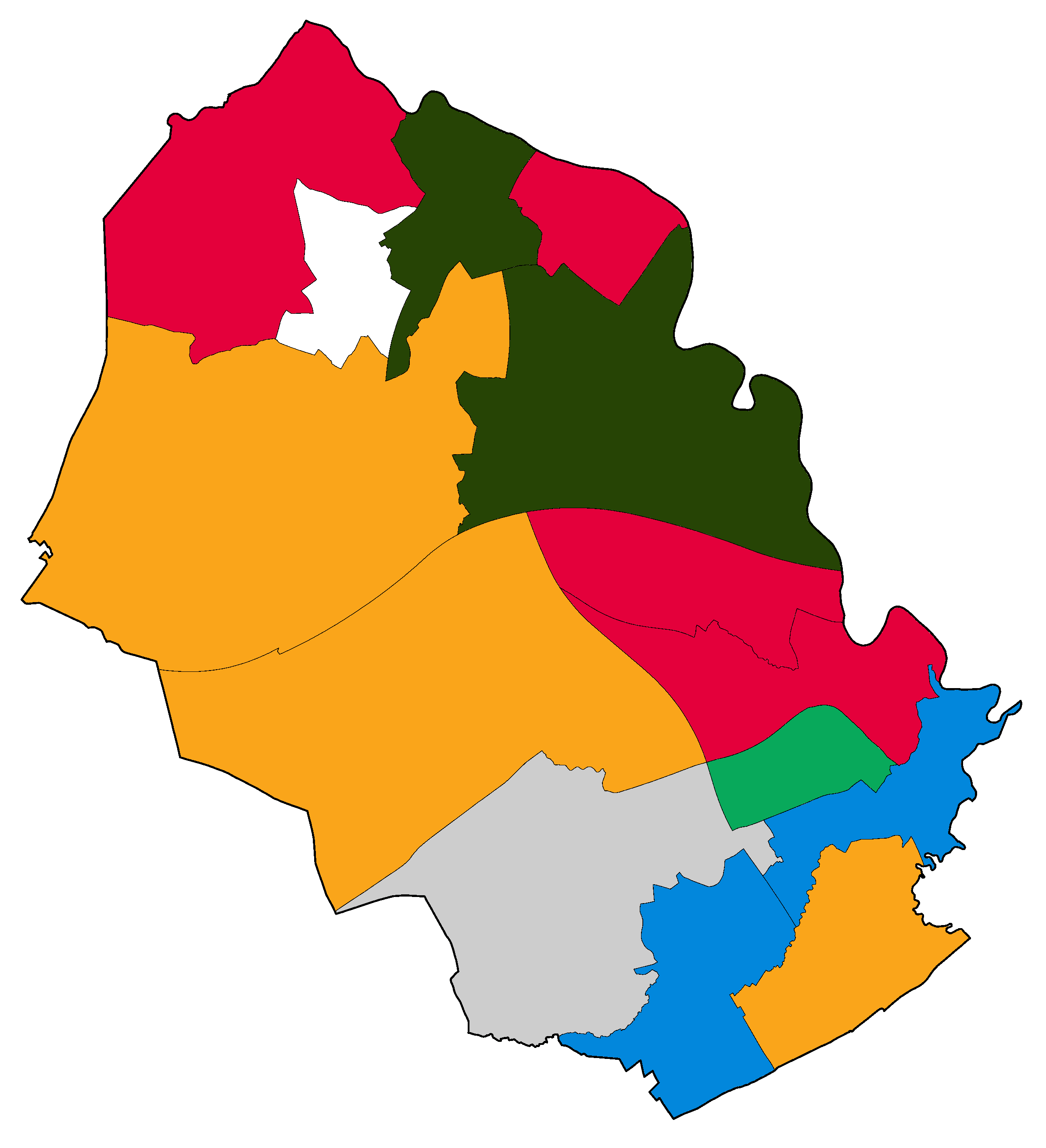
- A map presenting the results of the election, by party of the councillor elected from each ward.
Leader before election
Tom Gracey
Conservative
No overall control
Co-leaders after election
Robert King (Lab Co-op)
Don Whyte (Lib Dem)
Linda Gillham (RIRG)
Steve Ringham (Green)
No overall control

The 2024 Runnymede Borough Council election took place on 2 May 2024 to elect one-third of members of the Runnymede Borough Council in Surrey, England. This was on the same day as other local elections in England and police and crime commissioner elections.

The election saw the Conservatives lose all but three of the ten seats they were defending. Notable losses include Chertsey St. Ann's, where the incumbent council deputy leader lost his seat to Labour, and New Haw where the Liberal Democrats saw the largest majority in the borough, gaining from the Conservatives.

Following the resignation of the Conservative Party Councillor Max Darby, who represented the Ward of Woodham and Rowtown, there was a by-election to fill the vacancy held on the same day.

The council remained under no overall control. Following the election a coalition of Labour, the Liberal Democrats, the Runnymede Independent Residents' Group, the Green Party and three of the independent councillors formed to run the council, calling themselves the Runnymede Council Alliance group. At the subsequent annual council meeting on 15 May 2024 the four party leaders within the alliance were jointly appointed as co-leaders of the council.

== Results summary ==
2024 Runnymede Borough Council election
Party	This election				Full council			This election		
Party	Candidates	Seats	Net	Seats %	Other	Total	Total %	Votes	Votes %	+/−
Labour Co-op	{{{candidates}}}	4	▲4	28.6	4	8	19.5	4,298	21.7	+0.0
Conservative	{{{candidates}}}	3	▼7	21.4	10	13	31.7	7,173	36.3	−0.6
Liberal Democrats	{{{candidates}}}	3	▲2	21.4	3	6	14.6	3,962	20.0	+0.8
RIRG	{{{candidates}}}	2	0	14.3	4	6	14.6	1,400	7.1	−1.4
Green	{{{candidates}}}	1	▲1	7.1	2	3	7.3	1,438	7.3	+0.8
Independent	{{{candidates}}}	1	0	7.1	4	5	12.2	1,166	5.9	−0.4
Reform	{{{candidates}}}	0	0	0.0	0	0	0.0	252	1.3	+0.9
Heritage	{{{candidates}}}	0	0	0.0	0	0	0.0	95	0.5	+0.4

== Ward results ==
=== Addlestone North ===
Addlestone North
Party	Candidate	Votes	%	±%
Green	Priya Mehta	496	40.0	+0.3
Conservative	Tommy Traylen	321	25.8	−11.7
Labour Co-op	June Tilbury	188	15.1	−1.5
Reform	Stewart Mackay	151	12.1	New
Liberal Democrats	Stuart Lawrence	89	7.1	+0.8
Majority		175	14.1	
Rejected ballots		7		
Turnout		1245	28.2	−3.3
Green gain from Conservative		Swing	+6.0	

=== Addlestone South ===
Addlestone South
Party	Candidate	Votes	%	±%
Conservative	John Furey	605	42.0	+0.3
Labour Co-op	Elaine Percival	596	41.4	+5.1
Liberal Democrats	Theresa Burton	240	16.7	+4.5
Majority		9	0.6	
Rejected ballots		27		
Turnout		1441	30.0	−0.3
Conservative hold		Swing	−2.4	

=== Chertsey Riverside ===
Chertsey Riverside
Party	Candidate	Votes	%	±%
Labour Co-op	Cai Parry	653	45.9	+7.4
Conservative	John Osborn	538	37.8	−4.1
Green	Elaine Brindley	122	8.6	+0.7
Liberal Democrats	Liam Elvish	110	7.7	−4.0
Majority		115	8.1	
Rejected ballots		12		
Turnout		1423	31.2	+1.2
Labour Co-op gain from Conservative		Swing	+5.8	

=== Chertsey St. Ann's ===
Chertsey St. Ann's
Party	Candidate	Votes	%	±%
Labour Co-op	Mark Williams	654	47.2	+10.7
Conservative	Myles Willingale	480	34.7	−10.4
Liberal Democrats	Annabel Jones	150	10.8	−0.8
Green	Vicky Flynn	101	7.3	+0.6
Majority		174	12.6	
Rejected ballots		19		
Turnout		1385	29.5	−0.6
Labour Co-op gain from Conservative		Swing	+10.6	

=== Egham Hythe ===
Egham Hythe
Party	Candidate	Votes	%	±%
Labour Co-op	Ricky Milstead	758	53.8	+4.0
Conservative	Tanya Solomon	624	44.3	+2.8
Independent	Deshveen Mangat	117	8.3	New
Majority		134	9.5	
Rejected ballots		11		
Turnout		1410	29.0	−1.8
Labour Co-op gain from Conservative		Swing	+0.6	

=== Egham Town ===
Egham Town
Party	Candidate	Votes	%	±%
RIRG	Geeta Moudgil	735	50.6	−14.0
Conservative	Mark Adams	303	20.9	+6.1
Labour	Jocelyn Boxall	251	17.3	+1.4
Liberal Democrats	Ian Heath	112	7.7	+2.0
Green	Timothy Hayes	52	3.6	New
Majority		432	29.7	
Rejected ballots		3		
Turnout		1453	31.6	−1.2
RIRG hold		Swing	−10.1	

=== Englefield Green West ===
Englefield Green West
Party	Candidate	Votes	%	±%
Labour	Paul Gahir	370	32.9	−21.0
Conservative	Wendy Locker	332	29.5	−16.6
Independent	Amanda Willis	322	28.6	New
Reform	Bob Bromley	101	9.0	New
Majority		38	3.4	
Rejected ballots		4		
Turnout		1125	30.4	+0.4
Labour gain from Conservative		Swing	−2.2	

=== Longcross, Lyne and Chertsey South ===
Longcross, Lyne and Chertsey South
Party	Candidate	Votes	%	±%
Liberal Democrats	Kevin Lee	645	70.0	−3.2
Conservative	Steve Vise	276	30.0	+3.2
Majority		369	40.0	
Rejected ballots		21		
Turnout		921	31.6	−2.0
Liberal Democrats hold		Swing	−3.2	

=== New Haw ===
New Haw
Party	Candidate	Votes	%	±%
Liberal Democrats	Ken Graham	1,223	72.7	+8.0
Conservative	Howard Freeman	347	20.6	−10.0
Green	Martin Robson	85	5.1	+1.2
Heritage	Gian Palermiti	28	1.7	+0.8
Majority		876	52.0	
Rejected ballots		16		
Turnout		1683	35.6	−1.4
Liberal Democrats gain from Conservative		Swing	+9.0	

=== Ottershaw ===
Ottershaw
Party	Candidate	Votes	%	±%
Independent	Carl Mann	727	46.1	+0.7
Conservative	George Callaghan	384	24.4	−1.8
Labour Co-op	Anne Emerson-Miller	274	17.4	+4.3
Green	Peter Chiverton	99	6.3	−0.9
Liberal Democrats	David Charlton	92	5.8	−2.3
Majority		343	21.8	
Rejected ballots		10		
Turnout		1576	32.4	−1.6
Independent hold		Swing	+1.3	

=== Thorpe ===
Thorpe
Party	Candidate	Votes	%	±%
RIRG	Margaret Harnden	665	47.4	−6.1
Conservative	Roberto Bueno	491	35.0	+6.4
Labour Co-op	Benjamin Niblett	189	13.5	+0.6
Liberal Democrats	Cheryl Smith-Wright	58	4.1	−1.0
Majority		174	12.4	
Rejected ballots		4		
Turnout		1403	33.3	
RIRG hold		Swing	−6.3	

=== Virginia Water ===
Virginia Water
Party	Candidate	Votes	%	±%
Liberal Democrats	Karin Rowsell	808	50.8	+11.9
Conservative	Lewis Virgo	699	43.9	−3.6
Green	Maciej Pawlik	84	5.3	+2.4
Majority		109	6.7	
Rejected ballots		18		
Turnout		1591	37.4	−1.3
Liberal Democrats gain from Conservative		Swing	+7.8	

=== Woodham and Rowtown (2 seats) ===
Two seats are up for election due to the resignation of Councillor Max Darby, elected in 2022.

Woodham and Rowtown
Party	Candidate	Votes	%	±%
Conservative	Scott Lewis	919	55.2	
Conservative	Pippa Tucker-Brown	854	51.3	
Liberal Democrats	Jennifer Coulon	435	26.1	
Labour Co-op	Harry Hurst	365	21.9	
Green	Deborah Hepburn	253	15.2	
Green	Richard Miller	146	8.8	
Heritage	Rachel Bear	67	4.0	New
Rejected ballots		5		
Turnout		1,664	34.3	−0.1
Conservative hold		Swing		
Conservative hold		Swing		

== Committee Chairs Following Election ==
Party key	Conservative
Party key	Green
Party key	Labour
Party key	Liberal Democrat
Party key	RIRG

Chairs of Committees
Committee	Councillor	Term
The Worshipful; Mayor of Runnymede	Cllr Elaine Gill	2024-25
The Worshipful; Mayor of Runnymede	Cllr Margaret Harnden	2025-26
The Worshipful; Mayor of Runnymede	Cllr Steve Ringham	2026-27
Co-leader of the Council; Chair of Corporate Management Committee	Cllr Robert King	2024-
Co-leader of the Council; Chair of Environment & Sustainability Committee	Cllr Don Whyte	2024-
Chair of Housing Committee	Cllr Mike Smith	2024-
Chair of Community Services Committee	Cllr Abby King	2024-
Chair of Planning Committee	Cllr Sylvia Whyte	2024-
Chair of Licensing Committee	Cllr Eliza Kettle	2024-
Chair of Regulatory Committee	Cllr Eliza Kettle	2025-
Chair of Regulatory Committee	Cllr Margaret Harnden	2024-25
Chair of Standards & Audit Committee	Cllr Sam Jenkins	2024-25
Chair of Standards & Audit Committee	Cllr Manu Singh	2025-26
Chair of Standards & Audit Committee	Cllr Cai Parry	2026-
Chair of Englefield Green Committee	Cllr Paul Gahir	2024-
Chair of Overview & Scrutiny Select Committee; Chair of Crime & Disorder Committee	Cllr Shannon Saise-Marshall	2024-
Co-leaders not chairs of committees
Co-leader of the Council; Vice-Chair of Corporate Management Committee	Cllr Linda Gillham	2024-
Co-leader of the Council; Vice-Chair of Environment & Sustainability Committee	Cllr Steve Ringham	2024-26

== By-elections ==
=== Addlestone South, 10 October 2024 ===
A by-election took place on 10 October 2024 for Addlestone South ward following the death of Councillor Jonathan Wilson.

Addlestone South by-election, 10 October 2024
Party	Candidate	Votes	%	±%
Conservative	Steve Eldridge	520	55.9	+13.9
Labour Co-op	Elaine Percival	262	28.2	−13.2
Liberal Democrats	Jenny Coulon	85	9.1	−7.6
Green	Jess Ward	63	6.8	New
Majority		258	27.7	
Rejected ballots		8		
Turnout		930	19.0	−11.0
Conservative hold		Swing	+13.6	

=== Ottershaw, 12 December 2024 ===
A by-election will take place in Ottershaw on the 12th of December 2024 following the death of Councillor Malcolm Cressey.

Ottershaw by-election, 12 December 2024
Party	Candidate	Votes	%	±%
Independent	Robert Day	440	41.6	−4.5
Conservative	Mike Kusneraitis	221	20.9	−3.5
Liberal Democrats	Ronan McCaughey	190	18.0	+12.2
Reform	Mayuran Senthilnathan	113	10.7	New
Labour Co-op	Anne Emerson-Miller	52	4.9	−12.5
Green	Peter Chiverton	42	4.0	−2.3
Majority		219	20.7	
Rejected ballots		1		
Turnout		1058	21.5	−10.9
Independent hold		Swing	-0.5	

=== Addlestone South, 21 August 2025 ===
Further by-elections took place on the 21st August 2025 following the death of Cllr John Furey and the resignation of Conservative Leader Peter Snow. As such two seats were filled along with a concurrent by-election for the Addlestone County Division

Addlestone South by-election, 21 August 2025
Party	Candidate	Votes	%	±%
Reform	Scott Kelly	467	35.8	N/A
Reform	Sam Newman	414	31.7	N/A
Liberal Democrats	Jenny Coulon	356	27.3	+10.6
Liberal Democrats	Ronan McCaughey	352	27.0	+10.3
Conservative	Howard Freeman	329	25.2	–16.8
Conservative	Mike Kusneraitis	273	20.9	–21.1
Labour Co-op	Elaine Percival	146	11.2	–30.2
Green	Izabela Wawryszuk	145	11.1	N/A
Labour Co-op	Arran Neathy	129	9.9	–31.5
Turnout		1,376	28.3	–1.7
Registered electors		4,861		
Reform gain from Conservative				
Reform gain from Conservative				

== Progression of administration majority and party totals ==
Date	Event	Working majority	Administration					Other parties				Vacant
Date	Event	Working majority	Lab	LD	RIRG	Grn	Ind	Con	Ref	Grn	Ind	Vacant
6 May 2024	Election	9	8	6	6	3	2	13	0		3	0
4 August 2024	Wilson (Con) dies	10	8	6	6	3	2	12	0		3	1
30 September 2024	MC Cressey (Ind) dies	11	8	6	6	3	2	12	0		2	2
10 October 2024	Eldridge (Con) elected in Addlestone South	10	8	6	6	3	2	13	0		2	1
12 December 2024	Day (Ind) elected in Ottershaw	9	8	6	6	3	2	13	0		3	0
15 February 2025	Jenkins expelled from RIRG	7	8	6	5	3	2	13	0		4	0
23 February 2025	Jenkins joins the Conservatives	7	8	6	5	3	2	14	0		3	0
10 June 2025	Furey (Con) dies	8	8	6	5	3	2	13	0		3	1
10 July 2025	Snow (Con) resigns	9	8	6	5	3	2	12	0		3	2
21 August 2025	Kelly and Newman (both Ref) elected in Addlestone South	7	8	6	5	3	2	12	2		3	0
5 January 2026	Mann (Ind) joins Reform	7	8	6	5	3	2	12	3		2	0
2 February 2026	Singh (Grn) defects to the Liberal Democrats	7	8	7	5	2	2	12	3		2	0
23 September 2026	Berardi (Ind) resigns	6	8	7	5	2	1	12	3		2	1
22 October 2026	Greens leave administration	2	8	7	5		1	12	3	2	2	1
