= 2008 Runnymede Borough Council election =

2008 UK local government election

Results of the 2008 Runnymede Borough Council election

Elections to Runnymede Borough Council were held on 1 May 2008. One third of the council was up for election and the Conservative Party stayed in overall control of the council.

Three councillors had resigned from the council before the election and a further two did not stand for re-election. No seats changed hands with the Conservative Party remaining dominant on the council.

After the election, the composition of the council was:

- Conservative 36
- Runnymede Residents Association 6

== Election result ==
Runnymede local election result 2008
Party	Seats	Gains	Losses	Net gain/loss	Seats %	Votes %	Votes	+/−
Conservative	14	0	0	0	82.4	57.1	12,402	-1.0
RIRG	3	0	0	0	17.6	12.3	2,678	+2.5
Labour	0	0	0	0	0.0	14.6	3,160	+2.2
UKIP	0	0	0	0	0.0	8.3	1,808	-0.5
Liberal Democrats	0	0	0	0	0.0	6.5	1,408	-3.4
Independent	0	0	0	0	0.0	0.6	141	-0.3
Green	0	0	0	0	0.0	0.5	109	+0.5

== Ward results ==
Addlestone Bourneside
Party	Candidate	Votes	%	±%
Conservative	Patricia Broadhead	975	72.4	−3.8
Labour	Gavin Morrison	230	17.1	−6.7
Independent	Colin Stephens	141	10.5	+10.5
Majority		745	55.3	+2.9
Turnout		1,346	33.2	+1.9
Conservative hold		Swing		

Addlestone North
Party	Candidate	Votes	%	±%
Conservative	Rebecca Denby	731	65.0	+5.5
Labour	Deborah Greenwood	185	16.4	+0.8
Liberal Democrats	Peter Key	132	11.7	−1.4
UKIP	Tarun Comar	77	6.8	−3.7
Majority		546	48.6	+4.7
Turnout		1,125	27.6	−1.1
Conservative hold		Swing		

Chertsey Meads
Party	Candidate	Votes	%	±%
Conservative	Christopher Norman	826	60.4	+2.6
UKIP	Christopher Browne	294	21.5	+3.7
Labour	Bernie Stacey	247	18.1	+3.2
Majority		532	38.9	−1.1
Turnout		1,367	32.7	−0.7
Conservative hold		Swing		

Chertsey St.Ann's (2)
Party	Candidate	Votes	%	±%
Conservative	Christopher Chapman	755		
Conservative	Louis Pouyanne	698		
Labour	Paul Greenwood	461		
Labour	Kenneth Denyer	395		
UKIP	Robert Belobaba	191		
UKIP	Ileana Nguyen	142		
Turnout		2,642	31.2	−0.2
Conservative hold		Swing		
Conservative hold		Swing		

Chertsey South and Row Town
Party	Candidate	Votes	%	±%
Conservative	John Edwards	947	67.2	+3.3
UKIP	Gillian Ellis	262	18.6	−1.3
Labour	Peter Kingham	201	14.3	−1.9
Majority		685	48.6	+4.6
Turnout		1,410	35.2	−0.3
Conservative hold		Swing		

Egham Town
Party	Candidate	Votes	%	±%
RIRG	Anthony Moore	719	59.5	+5.1
Conservative	Andrew Sheldon	358	29.6	−5.7
Labour	Keith Thompson	132	10.9	+0.6
Majority		361	29.9	+10.8
Turnout		1,209	31.0	−1.9
RIRG hold		Swing		

Englefield Green East
Party	Candidate	Votes	%	±%
Conservative	Marisa Heath	493	51.9	−2.2
Liberal Democrats	James Whiteley	264	27.8	−7.8
Labour	Sebastian Michnowicz	101	10.6	+10.6
UKIP	Rosemary Browne	91	9.6	−0.6
Majority		229	24.1	+5.6
Turnout		949	23.3	−0.6
Conservative hold		Swing		

Englefield Green West
Party	Candidate	Votes	%	±%
Conservative	Hugh Meares	464	44.5	+2.0
UKIP	Anthony Micklethwait	264	25.3	−0.4
Labour	Roxanne Mashari	129	12.4	+12.4
Green	Jenny Gould	109	10.5	+10.5
Liberal Democrats	Ian Heath	77	7.4	−6.5
Majority		200	19.2	+2.4
Turnout		1,043	32.9	+0.3
Conservative hold		Swing		

Foxhills
Party	Candidate	Votes	%	±%
Conservative	Paul Francis	975	70.2	+9.4
Labour	John Gurney	227	16.3	+4.5
UKIP	Leon Mullett	187	13.5	−0.3
Majority		748	53.9	+6.9
Turnout		1,389	34.5	−0.7
Conservative hold		Swing		

Hythe (2)
Party	Candidate	Votes	%	±%
Conservative	Yvonna Lay	659		
Conservative	Jonathan Wilson	600		
Labour	David Bell	299		
Labour	Antonio Dorileo	281		
Liberal Democrats	Andrew Watson	191		
Liberal Democrats	Alexander Harrowell	187		
UKIP	Guy Leven-Torres	141		
Turnout		2,358	27.4	+0.3
Conservative hold		Swing		
Conservative hold		Swing		

New Haw
Party	Candidate	Votes	%	±%
Conservative	Adrian Tollett	895	72.5	+8.6
Liberal Democrats	Jennifer Coulon	339	27.5	−8.6
Majority		556	45.0	+17.2
Turnout		1,234	29.4	−2.3
Conservative hold		Swing		

Thorpe (2)
Party	Candidate	Votes	%	±%
RIRG	Elaine Gill	1,024		
RIRG	Margaret Harnden	935		
Conservative	William Roberts	485		
Conservative	Nicholas Wase-Rogers	373		
Turnout		2,817	34.1	−2.7
RIRG hold		Swing		
RIRG hold		Swing		

Virginia Water
Party	Candidate	Votes	%	±%
Conservative	Margaret Roberts	986	72.3	
Liberal Democrats	Christine Key	218	16.0	
UKIP	Steve Gynn	159	11.7	
Majority		768	56.3	
Turnout		1,363	33.6	−2.1
Conservative hold		Swing		

Woodham
Party	Candidate	Votes	%	±%
Conservative	Robert Jones	1,182	81.3	
Labour	George Blair	272	18.7	
Majority		910	62.6	
Turnout		1,454	35.2	−1.1
Conservative hold		Swing		
