= 2016 Runnymede Borough Council election =

2016 UK local government election

- 5 May 2016

15 seats to Runnymede Borough Council 22 seats needed for a majority
	First party	Second party
	Con	Res
Party	Conservative	RIRG
Last election	36	6
Seats won	36	6
- Map of the results of the election. Colours denote the winning party, as shown in the main table of results.
Council control before election
Conservative
Council control after election
Conservative

The 2016 Runnymede Borough Council election took place on 5 May 2016 to elect 15 members of Runnymede Borough Council in Surrey, England. This was on the same day as other local elections.

== Election result ==
After the election, the composition of the council was:

- Conservative: 36
- Runnymede Independent Residents' Group: 6

== Ward results ==
=== Addlestone Bourneside ===
Addlestone Bourneside
Party	Candidate	Votes	%	±%
Conservative	Cherith Mary Simmons	772	57.36	
Labour	June Patricia Tilbury	407	30.24	
Liberal Democrats	Donald James Whyte	148	10.99	
Turnout		1346	31.33	
Conservative hold		Swing		

=== Addlestone North ===
Addlestone North
Party	Candidate	Votes	%	±%
Conservative	Stewart Mark Mackay	722	59.82	
Labour	Anne Emerson-Miller	485	40.18	
Turnout		1225	26.93	
Conservative hold		Swing		

=== Chertsey Meads ===
Chertsey Meads
Party	Candidate	Votes	%	±%
Conservative	Mark Gordon Nuti	616	48.28	
Labour	Judith Elizabeth Middleton	290	22.73	
UKIP	Christopher David Butcher	271	21.24	
Green	Lee-Anne Josephine Collett Lawrance	91	7.13	
Turnout		1276	28.16	
Conservative hold		Swing		

=== Chertsey South and Row Town ===
Chertsey South and Row Town
Party	Candidate	Votes	%	±%
Conservative	Scott Alderson Lewis	785	56.47	
Green	Richard George Miller	345	24.82	
Labour	Philip Martin	249	17.91	
Turnout		1390	31.21	
Conservative hold		Swing		

=== Chertsey St Ann's ===
Chertsey St Ann's
Party	Candidate	Votes	%	±%
Conservative	Myles Lee Willingale	600	41.93	
Labour	Arran Richard Neathey	400	27.95	
UKIP	William Albert Bruno	315	22.01	
Liberal Democrats	Sylvia Jane Whyte	109	7.62	
Turnout		1431	29.38	
Conservative hold		Swing		

=== Egham Hythe ===
Egham Hythe
Party	Candidate	Votes	%	±%
Conservative	Yvonna Pia Lay	493	38.91	
Labour	Robert Ashley King	380	29.99	
UKIP	Alex Ali Balkan	269	21.23	
Liberal Democrats	Aidan Peter Leonard Watson	121	9.55	
Turnout		1267	26.24	
Conservative hold		Swing		

=== Egham Town ===
Egham Town
Party	Candidate	Votes	%	±%
RIRG	David John Knight	769	62.07	
Conservative	Liane Gibson	279	22.52	
Labour	Helen Elizabeth Jewell	187	15.09	
Turnout		1239	29.21	
RIRG hold		Swing		

=== Englefield Green East ===
Englefield Green East
Party	Candidate	Votes	%	±%
Conservative	Marisa Natalia Heath	502	65.19	
Labour	Benjamin James Tozer	161	20.91	
Liberal Democrats	Catherine Elizabeth Watson	101	13.17	
Turnout		770	31.36	
Conservative hold		Swing		

=== Englefield Green West ===
Englefield Green West
Party	Candidate	Votes	%	±%
Conservative	Nigel Michael King	365	42.20	
Labour	Abby Louise King	258	29.83	
UKIP	David Charles Hunt	237	27.40	
Turnout		865	25.44	
Conservative hold		Swing		

=== Foxhills ===
Foxhills
Party	Candidate	Votes	%	±%
Conservative	Iftikhar Ahmad Chaudhri	775	53.82	
UKIP	Christopher Alan Browne	426	29.58	
Labour	Fiona Robertson Dent	235	16.32	
Turnout		1440	34.20	
Conservative hold		Swing		

=== New Haw ===
New Haw
Party	Candidate	Votes	%	±%
Conservative	Adrian Peter Tollett	750	61.63	
Labour	James Richard Mullett	230	18.90	
Liberal Democrats	Jennifer Jane Coulon	224	18.41	
Turnout		1217	27.77	
Conservative hold		Swing		

=== Thorpe ===
Thorpe
Party	Candidate	Votes	%	±%
RIRG	Elaine Gill	790	56.27	
UKIP	John Stephen Gynn	342	24.36	
Conservative	Mark David Pearce	155	11.04	
Labour	Jacqueline Mary Fletcher	112	7.98	
Turnout		1404	33.03	
RIRG hold		Swing		

=== Virginia Water ===
Virginia Water
Party	Candidate	Votes	%	±%
Conservative	Carol Susan Sant Manduca	689	56.38	
RIRG	Brian Anthony Clarke	366	29.95	
UKIP	Ross Thompson	154	12.60	
Turnout		1222	29.32	
Conservative hold		Swing		

=== Woodham ===
Woodham
Party	Candidate	Votes	%	±%
Conservative	Thomas James Francis Gracey	961	72.15	
Conservative	David Ewan Anderson-Bassey	901	67.64	
UKIP	Valerie Ann Woodhouse	322	24.17	
Turnout		1410	33.11	
Conservative hold		Swing		
Conservative hold		Swing		
