= 2006 Runnymede Borough Council election =

2006 UK local government election

Results of the 2006 Runnymede Borough Council election

Elections to Runnymede Council were held on 4 May 2006. One third of the council was up for election and the Conservative Party stayed in overall control of the council.

After the election, the composition of the council was:

- Conservative 36
- Runnymede Residents Association 6

== Election result ==
Runnymede local election result 2006
| Party | Seats | Gains | Losses | Net gain/loss | Seats % | Votes % | Votes | +/− |
|---|---|---|---|---|---|---|---|---|
| Conservative | 14 | 3 | 0 | +3 | 87.5 | 55.4 | 11,881 | +3.7% |
| RIRG | 2 | 0 | 0 | 0 | 12.5 | 8.7 | 1,869 | -1.6% |
| Labour | 0 | 0 | 3 | -3 | 0 | 15.3 | 3,288 | -2.4% |
| Liberal Democrats | 0 | 0 | 0 | 0 | 0 | 13.7 | 2,932 | +1.0% |
| UKIP | 0 | 0 | 0 | 0 | 0 | 5.2 | 1,113 | -1.4% |
| Senior Citizens | 0 | 0 | 0 | 0 | 0 | 1.2 | 261 | +1.2% |
| Monster Raving Loony | 0 | 0 | 0 | 0 | 0 | 0.4 | 84 | +0.4% |

== Ward results ==
Addlestone Bourneside
| Party | Candidate | Votes | % | ±% |
|---|---|---|---|---|
| Conservative | John Furey | 977 | 71.1 | +6.7 |
| Labour | Gavin Morrison | 397 | 28.9 | +6.6 |
| Majority | | 580 | 42.2 | +0.1 |
| Turnout | | 1,374 | 34.0 | −1.2 |
| Conservative hold | | Swing | | |

Addlestone North
| Party | Candidate | Votes | % | ±% |
|---|---|---|---|---|
| Conservative | David Parr | 756 | 59.8 | −1.0 |
| Labour | David Bell | 283 | 22.4 | −1.1 |
| Liberal Democrats | Peter Key | 226 | 17.9 | +2.2 |
| Majority | | 473 | 37.4 | +0.1 |
| Turnout | | 1,265 | 31.3 | −1.3 |
| Conservative hold | | Swing | | |

Chertsey Meads
| Party | Candidate | Votes | % | ±% |
|---|---|---|---|---|
| Conservative | Paul Tuley | 750 | 53.4 | +5.0 |
| UKIP | Christopher Browne | 256 | 18.2 | −1.8 |
| Labour | Bernie Stacey | 221 | 15.7 | −0.8 |
| Liberal Democrats | Ross Belson | 178 | 12.7 | −2.3 |
| Majority | | 494 | 35.2 | +6.8 |
| Turnout | | 1,405 | 33.5 | −2.3 |
| Conservative hold | | Swing | | |

Chertsey St.Ann's
| Party | Candidate | Votes | % | ±% |
|---|---|---|---|---|
| Conservative | Richard Edis | 838 | 59.5 | +0.3 |
| Labour | Paul Greenwood | 571 | 40.5 | −0.3 |
| Majority | | 267 | 19.0 | +0.6 |
| Turnout | | 1,409 | 32.3 | −4.0 |
| Conservative gain from Labour | | Swing | | |

Chertsey South and Row Town
| Party | Candidate | Votes | % | ±% |
|---|---|---|---|---|
| Conservative | Anthony Davis | 1,026 | 68.2 | +2.6 |
| Liberal Democrats | James Whiteley | 272 | 18.1 | −1.2 |
| Labour | Peter Kingham | 206 | 13.7 | −1.5 |
| Majority | | 754 | 50.1 | +3.8 |
| Turnout | | 1,504 | 38.2 | −1.8 |
| Conservative hold | | Swing | | |

Egham Town
| Party | Candidate | Votes | % | ±% |
|---|---|---|---|---|
| RIRG | Alan Alderson | 827 | 63.7 | −1.4 |
| Conservative | Terence McGrath | 326 | 25.1 | +3.1 |
| Labour | Keith Thompson | 146 | 11.2 | −1.7 |
| Majority | | 501 | 38.6 | −4.5 |
| Turnout | | 1,299 | 32.5 | −3.2 |
| RIRG hold | | Swing | | |

Englefield Green East (2)
| Party | Candidate | Votes | % | ±% |
|---|---|---|---|---|
| Conservative | Patrick Roberts | 591 | | |
| Conservative | Niall Thewlis | 471 | | |
| Liberal Democrats | Peter Russell | 324 | | |
| Liberal Democrats | Alexander Harrowell | 282 | | |
| UKIP | Anthony Micklethwait | 124 | | |
| Monster Raving Loony | Keith Collett | 84 | | |
| Turnout | | 1,876 | 25.1 | +1.3 |
| Conservative hold | | Swing | | |
| Conservative hold | | Swing | | |

Englefield Green West
| Party | Candidate | Votes | % | ±% |
|---|---|---|---|---|
| Conservative | Michael Kusneraitis | 591 | 56.7 | +6.5 |
| Liberal Democrats | Ian Heath | 185 | 17.7 | +4.4 |
| Labour | Adrian Elston | 146 | 14.0 | −6.0 |
| UKIP | Harold Pearce | 121 | 11.6 | −4.8 |
| Majority | | 406 | 39.0 | +8.8 |
| Turnout | | 1,043 | 31.6 | +3.2 |
| Conservative hold | | Swing | | |

Foxhills
| Party | Candidate | Votes | % | ±% |
|---|---|---|---|---|
| Conservative | Howard Butterfield | 819 | 53.8 | +0.9 |
| Labour | John Gurney | 230 | 15.1 | +0.9 |
| Liberal Democrats | Nancy Palm | 194 | 12.7 | −2.6 |
| UKIP | Leon Mullett | 165 | 10.8 | −6.9 |
| Senior Citizens | Grahame Leon-Smith | 115 | 7.6 | +7.6 |
| Majority | | 589 | 38.7 | +3.5 |
| Turnout | | 1,523 | 36.7 | 0.0 |
| Conservative hold | | Swing | | |

Hythe (2)
| Party | Candidate | Votes | % | ±% |
|---|---|---|---|---|
| Conservative | Rebecca Nixey | 649 | | |
| Conservative | Nik Stewart | 549 | | |
| Labour | Robert Ray | 463 | | |
| Liberal Democrats | Dorian Mead | 352 | | |
| Labour | Benjamin Rose | 319 | | |
| UKIP | Guy Leven-Torres | 252 | | |
| Turnout | | 2,584 | 29.9 | 0.0 |
| Conservative gain from Labour | | Swing | | |
| Conservative gain from Labour | | Swing | | |

New Haw
| Party | Candidate | Votes | % | ±% |
|---|---|---|---|---|
| Conservative | Christopher Knight | 1,067 | 79.4 | +19.9 |
| Liberal Democrats | Jennifer Coulon | 277 | 20.6 | −4.5 |
| Majority | | 790 | 58.8 | +24.4 |
| Turnout | | 1,344 | 31.3 | −2.2 |
| Conservative hold | | Swing | | |

Thorpe
| Party | Candidate | Votes | % | ±% |
|---|---|---|---|---|
| RIRG | Brian Relph | 1,042 | 64.2 | −1.9 |
| Conservative | Nicholas Wase-Rogers | 444 | 27.4 | +1.0 |
| Labour | Michael Fuller | 136 | 8.4 | +0.9 |
| Majority | | 598 | 36.8 | −2.9 |
| Turnout | | 1,622 | 38.2 | −0.8 |
| RIRG hold | | Swing | | |

Virginia Water
| Party | Candidate | Votes | % | ±% |
|---|---|---|---|---|
| Conservative | Gillian Switalski | 1,035 | 66.2 | +2.6 |
| Liberal Democrats | Christine Key | 333 | 21.3 | +4.7 |
| UKIP | John Gynn | 195 | 12.5 | −0.4 |
| Majority | | 702 | 44.9 | −2.1 |
| Turnout | | 1,563 | 37.8 | +1.0 |
| Conservative hold | | Swing | | |

Woodham
| Party | Candidate | Votes | % | ±% |
|---|---|---|---|---|
| Conservative | Michael Brown | 992 | 61.3 | −2.0 |
| Liberal Democrats | Janet Cockle | 309 | 19.1 | −5.6 |
| Labour | George Blair | 170 | 10.5 | −1.5 |
| Senior Citizens | Terence Pattinson | 146 | 9.0 | +9.0 |
| Majority | | 683 | 42.2 | +3.6 |
| Turnout | | 1,617 | 38.6 | −0.7 |
| Conservative hold | | Swing | | |
