= 1999 Runnymede Borough Council election =

1999 UK local government election

Elections to Runnymede Council were held on 6 May 1999. One third of the council was up for election and the Conservative party stayed in overall control of the council.

After the election, the composition of the council was

- Conservative 25
- Labour 9
- Independent 6
- Liberal Democrat 2

== Election result ==
Runnymede local election result 1999
Party	Seats	Gains	Losses	Net gain/loss	Seats %	Votes %	Votes	+/−
Conservative	9			+2	64.3	50.5	8,687	+3.4%
Labour	2			-3	14.3	27.4	4,707	-1.3%
Independent	2			0	14.3	10.2	1,761	+1.5%
Liberal Democrats	1			+1	7.1	11.8	2,030	-3.8%

== Ward results ==
Addlestone Bourneside
Party	Candidate	Votes	%	±%
Conservative	Peter Waddell	902	58.4	+5.2
Labour	Adrian Elston	642	41.6	−5.2
Majority		260	16.8	+10.4
Turnout		1,544	36.1	−2.5

Addlestone North
Party	Candidate	Votes	%	±%
Conservative	Graham Thomas	702	53.5	+7.4
Labour	Bernie Stacey	609	46.5	−7.4
Majority		93	7.0	
Turnout		1,311	31.9	−2.5

Addlestone St. Paul's
Party	Candidate	Votes	%	±%
Conservative	Kenneth Clark	816	63.8	+2.3
Labour	Kenneth Denyer	314	24.5	+1.7
Liberal Democrats	Geoffrey Pyle	150	11.7	−4.0
Majority		502	39.3	+0.6
Turnout		1,280	28.9	−0.8

Chertsey Meads
Party	Candidate	Votes	%	±%
Conservative	Christopher Norman	859	49.2	+3.7
Labour	Peter Kingham	727	41.6	−2.9
Liberal Democrats	Derek Weston	161	9.2	−0.8
Majority		132	7.6	+6.6
Turnout		1,747	33.1	−1.5

Chertsey St. Ann's
Party	Candidate	Votes	%	±%
Labour	Peter Anderson	636	57.0	−0.6
Conservative	Judith Norman	480	43.0	+7.7
Majority		156	14.0	−8.3
Turnout		1,116	28.2	−6.1

Egham
Party	Candidate	Votes	%	±%
Independent	John Ashmore	981	68.2	+5.1
Conservative	Ian Angell	248	17.2	−1.7
Labour	Monica Dowling	210	14.6	−3.4
Majority		733	51.0	+6.8
Turnout		1,439	26.9	−1.6

Englefield Green East
Party	Candidate	Votes	%	±%
Conservative	Timothy Stones	485	66.3	+10.4
Labour	James Swindlehurst	144	19.7	−3.6
Liberal Democrats	Peter Key	103	14.1	−6.7
Majority		341	46.6	+14.0
Turnout		732	17.1	−3.4

Englefield Green West
Party	Candidate	Votes	%	±%
Conservative	Anthony Richardson	609	53.9	+10.4
Labour	Martin Rudd	520	46.1	−1.6
Majority		89	7.8	
Turnout		1,129	28.3	−2.8

Foxhills
Party	Candidate	Votes	%	±%
Conservative	Frances Barden	716	64.7	+4.7
Liberal Democrats	Carl Boyde	390	35.3	−4.7
Majority		326	29.4	+9.4
Turnout		1,106	25.3	−4.9

Hythe
Party	Candidate	Votes	%	±%
Labour	Rodney Pate	536	49.1	−5.7
Conservative	Dennis Dormer	372	34.1	−0.5
Liberal Democrats	Dorian Mead	184	16.8	+6.2
Majority		164	15.0	−5.2
Turnout		1,092	22.8	−1.7

New Haw
Party	Candidate	Votes	%	±%
Liberal Democrats	Terence Gibbons	695	52.8	−7.6
Conservative	Colin Richardson	621	47.2	+7.6
Majority		74	5.6	−15.2
Turnout		1,316	33.2	−1.2

Thorpe
Party	Candidate	Votes	%	±%
Independent	Eiry Price	780	66.7	+35
Conservative	Mark Pearce	275	23.5	−0.8
Labour	Robert Findlay	115	9.8	−2.7
Majority		505	43.2	+4.3
Turnout		1,170	27.5	−1.6

Virginia Water
Party	Candidate	Votes	%	±%
Conservative	Geoffrey Woodger	730	79.3	+2.8
Liberal Democrats	Thomas Palm	112	12.2	+0.5
Labour	William Heal	78	8.5	−3.3
Majority		618	67.1	+2.4
Turnout		920	30.2	−2.1

Woodham
Party	Candidate	Votes	%	±%
Conservative	Valerie Smallman	872	68.0	
Liberal Democrats	David Castleton	235	18.3	
Labour	Angela Gould	176	13.7	
Majority		637	49.7	
Turnout		1,283	34.4	−5.3
