= 2011 Runnymede Borough Council election =

2011 UK local government election

Results of the 2011 Runnymede Borough Council election

The 2011 Runnymede Borough Council election took place on 5 May 2011 to fill 14 open seats on the Runnymede Borough District Council. The Conservative Party swept the elections, earning nearly 86% of the seats with only 54% of votes cast.

== Election result ==
Runnymede Borough Election, 2011
Party	Seats	Gains	Losses	Net gain/loss	Seats %	Votes %	Votes	+/−
Conservative	12				85.72	53.73	12,373	
RIRG	2				14.28	8.64	1,990	
Labour	0				0.00	17.66	4,068	
UKIP	0				0.00	11.21	2,581	
Liberal Democrats	0				0.00	8.56	1,972	
Monster Raving Loony	0				0.00	0.19	44	

== Ward results ==
Addlestone Bourneside (1 Councillor)
Party	Candidate	Votes	%	±%
Labour	Gavin Morrison	474	27.81%	
Liberal Democrats	Cleo Saise	186	10.91%	
Conservative	Peter Waddell	1,045	61.30%	
Majority		1,045	61.30%	
Turnout		1,705	39.30%	

Addlestone North (1 Councillor)
Party	Candidate	Votes	%	±%
Conservative	Jim Broadhead	883	58.10%	
Monster Raving Loony	Keith Collett	44	2.90%	
Labour	Anne Emerson	423	27.83%	
Liberal Democrats	Geoff Pyle	170	11.19%	
Majority		883	58.10%	
Turnout		1,520	35.10%	

Chertsey Meads (1 Councillor)
Party	Candidate	Votes	%	±%
UKIP	Christopher Browne	320	18.39%	
Conservative	Derek Cotty	945	54.28%	
Liberal Democrats	Peter Key	146	8.39%	
Labour	Doug Scott	330	18.99%	
Majority		945	54.28%	
Turnout		1,741	38.50%	

Chertsey South & Row Town (1 Councillor)
Party	Candidate	Votes	%	±%
Labour	Ken Denyer	308	16.96%	
Conservative	Terry Dicks	989	54.44%	
UKIP	Gillian Ellis	339	18.66%	
Liberal Democrats	Derek Weston	181	9.97%	
Majority		989	54.44%	
Turnout		1,817	44.80%	

Chertsey St. Anns (1 Councillor)
Party	Candidate	Votes	%	±%
Conservative	Dolsie Clarke	786	46.13%	
Labour	Paul Greenwood	550	32.28%	
UKIP	Angela Shepperdson	368	21.60%	
Majority		786	46.13%	
Turnout		1,704	35%	

Egham Hythe (1 Councillor)
Party	Candidate	Votes	%	±%
Liberal Democrats	Dorian Meade	338	21.24%	
Labour	Andreea Scott	436	27.39%	
Conservative	Gill Warner	818	51.39%	
Majority		818	51.39%	
Turnout		1,592	33.20%	

Egham Town (1 Councillor)
Party	Candidate	Votes	%	±%
RIRG	John Ashmore	900	53.42%	
UKIP	Rosemary Browne	104	6.18%	
Conservative	Ifti Chaudhri	481	28.55%	
Labour	Deb Greenwood	200	11.87%	
Majority		900	53.42%	
Turnout		1,685	39.40%	

Englefield Green East (1 Councillor)
Party	Candidate	Votes	%	±%
UKIP	Ben Lyon	147	12.33%	
Conservative	Peter Taylor	684	57.34%	
Liberal Democrats	Andy Watson	362	30.35%	
Majority		684	57.34%	
Turnout		1,193	29%	

Englefield Green West (1 Councillor)
Party	Candidate	Votes	%	±%
UKIP	Brenda Lyon	355	33.02%	
Conservative	Nick Prescot	720	66.98%	
Majority		720	66.98%	
Turnout		1,075	33.10%	

Foxhills (1 Councillor)
Party	Candidate	Votes	%	±%
Conservative	Frances Barden	993	55.48%	
Liberal Democrats	Lawrence Gillies	155	8.66%	
Labour	John Gurney	317	17.71%	
UKIP	Toby Micklethwait	325	18.16%	
Majority		993	55.48%	
Turnout		1,790	42.10%	

New Haw (1 Councillor)
Party	Candidate	Votes	%	±%
Labour	David Bell	280	16.74%	
Liberal Democrats	Jennifer Coulon	233	13.93%	
UKIP	Leon Mullet	222	13.27%	
Conservative	Damian Sorgiovanni	938	56.07%	
Majority		938	56.07%	
Turnout		1,673	38.10%	

Thorpe (1 Councillor)
Party	Candidate	Votes	%	±%
RIRG	Linda Gillham	1,090	58.48%	
UKIP	Steve Gynn	173	9.29%	
Labour	James Hale	123	6.60%	
Conservative	Nicholas Wase-Rogers	478	25.65%	
Majority		1,090	58.48%	
Turnout		1,864	43.70%	

Virginia Water (1 Councillor)
Party	Candidate	Votes	%	±%
Liberal Democrats	Ian Heath	201	11.52%	
Labour	Bernie Stacey	212	12.15%	
Conservative	Geoffrey Woodger	1,333	76.35%	
Majority		1,333	76.35%	
Turnout		1,746	40.30%	

Woodham (1 Councillor)
Party	Candidate	Votes	%	±%
Labour	Brenda Head	415	21.59%	
Conservative	Gail Kingerley	1,280	66.57%	
UKIP	Graham Wood	228	11.86%	
Majority		1,280	66.57%	
Turnout		1,923	45.70%	
