= Runnymede Independent Residents' Group =

UK political party

- Abbreviation: RIRG
- Leader: Siân Williams
- Runnymede Group Leader: Linda Gillham
- Founded: 29 October 2001; 24 years ago
- Headquarters: Egham
- Ideology: Localism
- West Surrey Council: 1 / 90
- Surrey County Council: 0 / 81
- Runnymede Borough Council: 5 / 41

Runnymede Independent Residents' Group (RIRG) is a residents association and political party based in the Borough of Runnymede. It currently forms part of the administration of Runnymede Borough Council with Labour, Liberal Democrats and independents; one of its councillors, Linda Gillham, serves as co-leader of the council.

== History ==
The group was founded in 2001. They have consistently held six seats on the borough council since then.

The group has campaigned on issues including recycling and the building of an incinerator.

RIRG was the sole opposition to the Conservative administration on the borough council from 2006 to 2013, when Ukip and an independent both won by-elections. This was the case again from 2015 to 2018, when Labour and Independent councillors were elected.

After the 2024 Runnymede Borough Council election, the party had six seats and the council was under no overall control. RIRG joined Labour, the Liberal Democrats, Greens, and three independents to form the Runnymede Council Alliance and control the council, with the four party leaders all serving as co-leader of the council. They said that this was the first arrangement of its kind in England. It also marked the first time since the council's creation in 1974, that it was not led by the Conservatives.

In February 2025, one of the party's councillors, Sam Jenkins, was expelled from the RIRG after abstaining on a vote and subsequently joined the Conservatives. This left RIRG with five remaining councillors.

At the 2026 West Surrey Council elections, the RIRG faced almost total wipeout, with just one Councillor, Isabel Mullens, elected to the shadow authority. Mullens was also the only member of the Runnymede Council Alliance administration to be elected to West Surrey Council. All of the other West Surrey seats covering the geographical areas previously represented at Runnymede by the RIRG went to either the Conservatives or Reform.
