= Equal Parenting Alliance =

- Leader: Ray Barry
- Founded: 22 February 2006; 20 years ago
- Dissolved: 6 November 2020; 5 years ago
- Split from: Fathers 4 Justice; New Fathers 4 Justice
- Headquarters: Manchester
- Membership (2019): 82
- Ideology: Fathers' rights movement

The Equal Parenting Alliance was a minor political party in the United Kingdom. It campaigned around issues of fathers' rights.

== History ==
The party was founded in February 2006 by former members of Fathers 4 Justice and New Fathers 4 Justice. It aimed to bring about reform of English family law.

The party was led by retired Birmingham civil servant and trained priest Ray Barry, who claimed he had not been allowed to see two of his three children for years. He stated his desire for there to be "a presumption that separated parents remain jointly responsible for their children" and that he would "dearly love to see the churches more involved".

In the 2007 Scottish Parliament election, Barry stood as a candidate in the Carrick, Cumnock and Doon Valley constituency. He came last out of six candidates, with 0.4% of the vote.

In the 2007 Runnymede Borough Council election, the party stood a candidate in Addlestone North ward. He came last out of five candidates, receiving 17 votes (1.4%).

In the 2008 Wolverhampton City Council election, the party Barry ran in the Tettenhall Wightwick ward. He came last out of four candidates, with 2.4% of the vote.

The party ran a candidate in the June 2009 by-election for the Woodham ward on Runnymede Borough Council. He came last out of four candidates, with 4.9% of the vote.

In the 2010 United Kingdom general election, Barry ran as a candidate in Wolverhampton South West and Roger Crawford stood for the party in Oxford East. Barry came last out of five candidates with 0.6% of the vote and Crawford came last out of seven candidates with 0.1% of the vote.

On 6 November 2020, the party was deregistered with the Electoral Commission. It had 82 members in its final year of existence.

== Policies ==
The party's policies included:

- Legal presumption of reasonable parenting time for both parents in the event of parental separation.
- Shared residence should be normal when there are two fit, capable parents.
- All contact and parenting time arrangements will be governed by the Good Reason Principle.
- The introduction of the Early Interventions Pilot Project to replace the Family Resolutions Project.
- Compulsory mediation for both parents after separation and before entering into the court system.
- Open Family Courts, with all reporting to be anonymised to protect children from publicity
- Court orders for contact, parenting time and shared or joint residence, must be enforced by the courts unless there is good reason to do otherwise.
- All allegations of domestic violence or child abuse made during a child contact case should be made under oath, and dealt with quickly by a criminal court capable of delivering a clear verdict.
- Any parent who deliberately harms a child's relationship with either parent, without good reason, should be treated as being guilty of emotional and psychological abuse of the child.
- All fathers, regardless of marital status or naming on the birth certificate, to be given parental responsibility. Where paternity is in doubt, a DNA test must be used.
- Both parents must have access to a child's medical and educational records, and full involvement in school activities.
- Grandparents should have a legal right to apply for contact with their grandchildren.
- Custody being split equally for both parents and a non-residing parent should be able to spend up to 100 days and nights with their child.
