= Oval Mansions =

Housing blocks in Kennington, London

Coordinates: 51.4849°N 0.1153°W

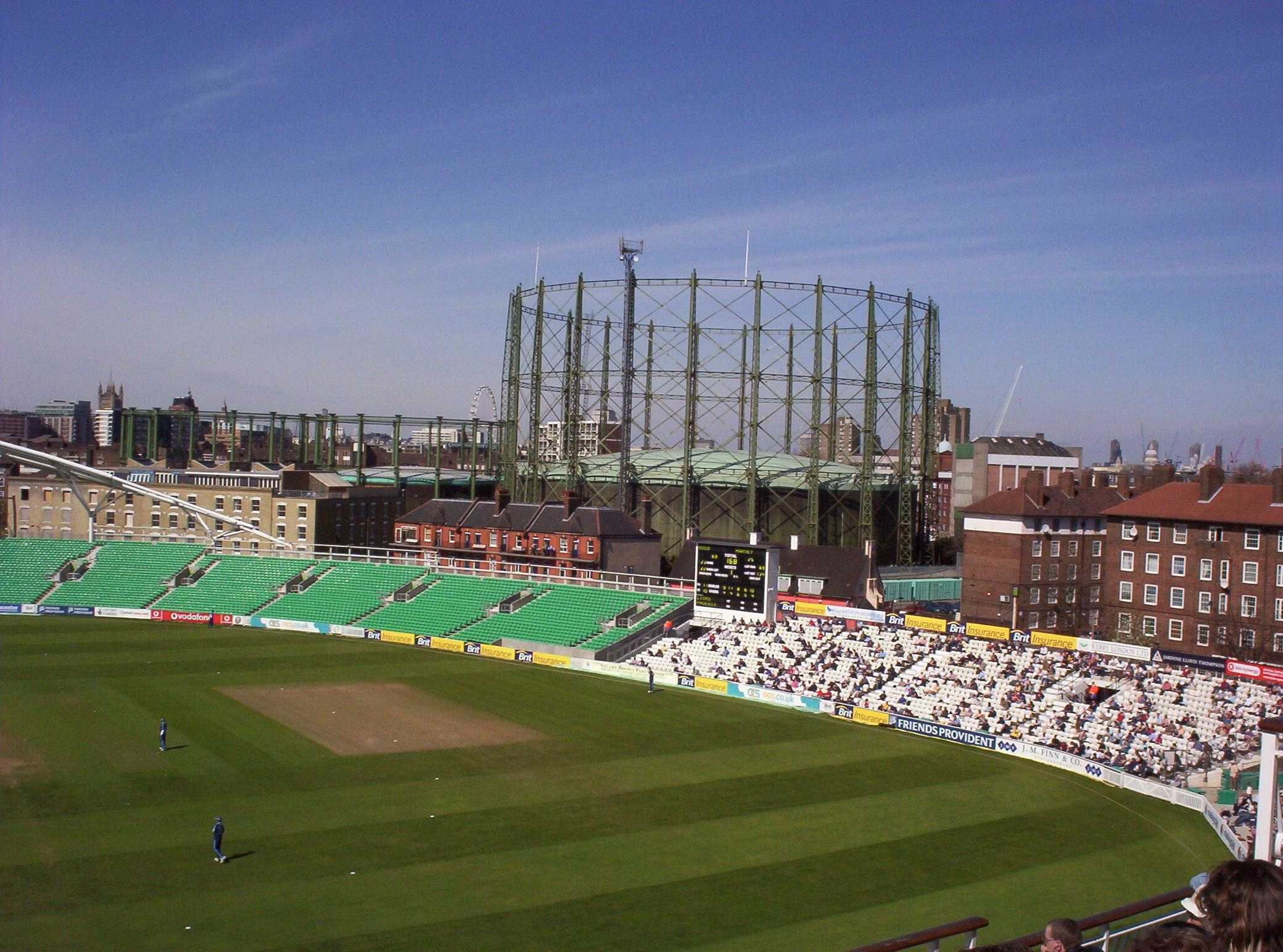
A four storey cream-coloured block of the complex is pictured in 2005 to the left of the photograph, above the cricket ground

Oval Mansions are eight separate blocks of tenement housing in Kennington, south London. The blocks stand between the Oval cricket ground and the Oval Gasholders. After being occupied by 100 squatters from 1983 until 2000 (notable residents including Ian Dury, Gillian Wearing, Michael Barrymore, Matthew Corbett and Ben Myers), the buildings were sold off by Lambeth Council in the early 2000s.

== Construction ==
The eight blocks of the Oval Mansions were built as tenement housing in the 1890s. The original inhabitants were nurses and employees at the nearby gasworks. Some of four-storey blocks overlook the Oval cricket ground, and it is possible to watch cricket from the roof.

The blocks were closed in 1979 by order of the new owner, Lambeth Council, since they were becoming unsafe; they had wooden stairs and no fire escapes. The council had bought the mainly uninhabited site from the Greater London Council.

== Squatted ==
Most of the empty buildings were squatted from January 1983 onwards. Blocks 1, 3 and 4 were occupied in 1983, blocks 2 and 7 in 1984 and blocks 6 and 8 in 1985. The council having forgotten about them, the squatters renovated and repaired the apartments, living there in a community of approximately 100 people. Notable residents included the singer Ian Dury (pre 1979), artists Gillian Wearing and Fiona Banner, writer Ben Myers and musicians Pan Sonic.

Between 1988 and 1998, squatters set up and ran the City Racing art gallery in a former betting shop on the ground floor. The gallery exhibited the work of Young British Artists such as Sarah Lucas and Gillian Wearing, selling three Lucas artworks to Charles Saatchi. The community also ran a film club and tended shared gardens.

== Eviction ==
By the late 1990s, Lambeth Council had realised the increasing monetary value of the apartments and issued eviction proceedings in 1997. The squatters were offered social housing elsewhere, which some took, but others contested the eviction process, arguing that they were entitled to adverse possession since they had lived there as a community for over twelve years. Thirty-two squatters made their case in court, and six apartments successfully gained ownership. Judge Cooke decided that another 53 squats had not proven their case, with one extra still in dispute. The squatters took their case to the Court of Appeal, claiming that they had acquired title by virtue of joint possession. The appeal was rejected in December 2000.

By 2003, Lambeth Council had sold the majority of the Oval Mansions for £5.1 million. As of 2015, a penthouse apartment could be rented for £500 per week and in 2017, a two-bed apartment sold for £730,000.

== See also ==
- Bonnington Square, another famous squat in Lambeth
- Frestonia, a squat in the London Borough of Kensington and Chelsea
- Wrigley Rooftops, a sports venue vantage point in Chicago
