= Bonnington Square =

Square in Vauxhall, south London, built in 1890s, squatted in 1980s

Coordinates: 51.4843°N 0.12°W

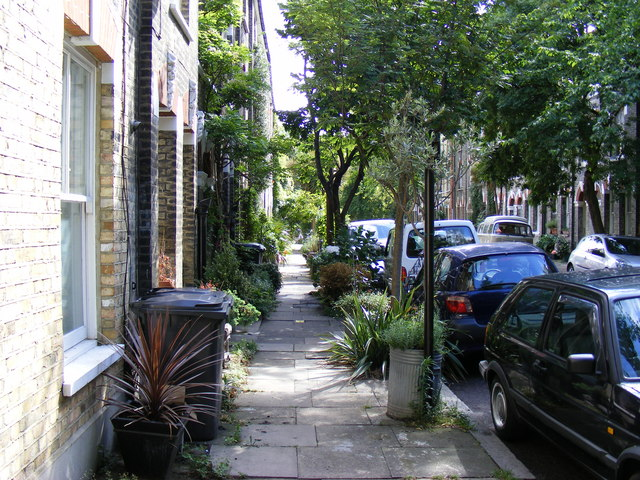
Bonnington Square

Bonnington Square is a square in Vauxhall, south London, which was built in the 1870s. It became famous in the 1980s when all the houses in it, vacant and awaiting demolition, were squatted, and the community formed continues to the present day.

== History ==
Bonnington Square was constructed in the 1870s in order to house railway workers. By the late 1970s, Bonnington Square was compulsorily purchased by the Greater London Council (GLC) for the Inner London Education Authority (ILEA), which intended to demolish it in order to build a new school. A Turkish shopkeeper in one of the buildings managed to prevent the demolition through legal means during the period in which all the houses' occupants were departing, and shortly afterward squatters began moving into the vacated buildings.

== Squatted ==
In the 1980s, the square was almost completely occupied. The squatters established a volunteer-run vegetarian cafė, a community garden on part of the square that had been bombed during the Second World War, a bar, a nightclub and a wholefoods shop. The squatters subsequently formed a housing cooperative and successfully negotiated with ILEA for the right to lease the buildings. The café and garden continue into the present.

== The Pleasure Garden ==
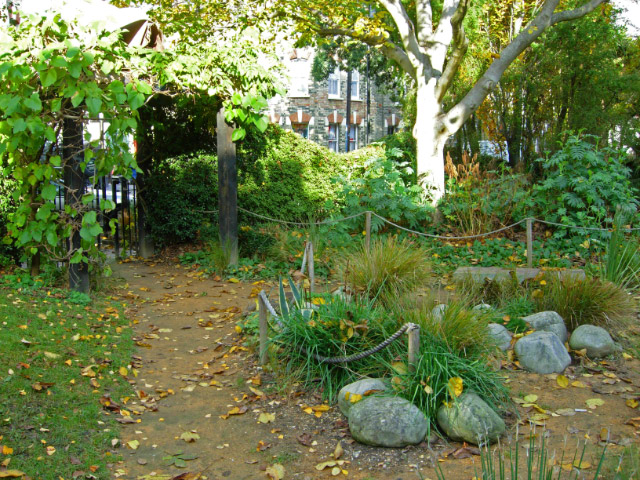
Inside the garden

The residents of the square undertook a project in 1990 to change the garden into a "Pleasure Garden" (named in homage to the nearby Vauxhall Pleasure Gardens), and in the process formed the Bonnington Square Garden Association. The garden occupies the space left by seven buildings bombed out in World War II. In 1998, the housing cooperative was permitted by the London Borough of Lambeth to purchase the buildings.

The garden includes many tropical plants, including palm trees.

In June 2018, two performances of Twelfth Night by Flute Theatre were held in the gardens in a production directed by actress Kelly Hunter.

== See also ==
- Oval Mansions, another famous squat in Lambeth
- Harleyford Road Community Garden, accessible from Bonnington Square
