= Bobby Smith (activist) =

British activist

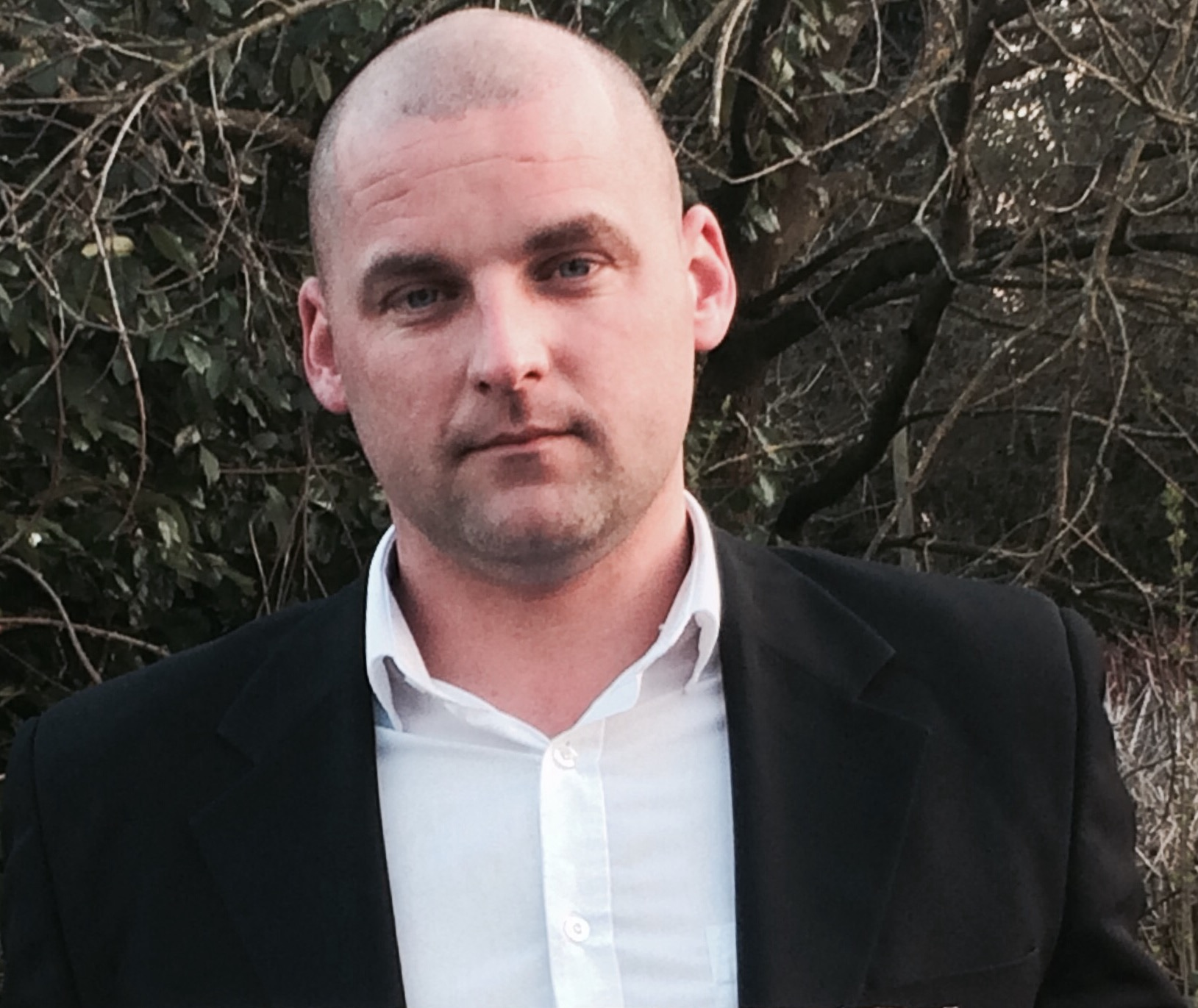
- Born: February 1982 (age 44); Enfield, London, England
- Occupation: Activist
- Office: Leader of Give Me Back Elmo (since 2015)
- Political party: Give Me Back Elmo

Bobby Smith (born February 1982) is a British political and fathers' rights activist. He is the founder and leader of the Give Me Back Elmo party which he set up to seek to change the law in family courts after his own experiences.

== Political activity ==
Smith stood in the Witney constituency for the Give Me Back Elmo Party in the 2015 general election. He and the party received media coverage as Smith and two other members of the party waited with placards to greet the Prime Minister, David Cameron, at the polling station where he cast his vote on election day (7 May 2015), and Smith appeared while dressed as the Sesame Street character Elmo at the vote count in numerous photos with the Prime Minister and behind him on the stage. Smith ultimately finished tenth of twelve candidates, with 37 votes (0.1%).

Smith stood in the Chells ward at the 2016 Stevenage Borough Council election, receiving 23 votes and finishing in last place in a field of six candidates.

After the death of Harry Harpham MP, Smith was a candidate in the 2016 Sheffield Brightside and Hillsborough by-election, receiving 58 votes (0.2%) and finishing in last place in a field of seven candidates.

After the resignation of Sadiq Khan MP, Smith stood in the 2016 Tooting by-election and received nine votes, finishing second-last of fourteen candidates.

He received just three votes, finishing last out of thirteen candidates, in the general election in June 2017, standing in the Maidenhead constituency, where Prime Minister Theresa May was re-elected.

After the recall of Fiona Onasanya MP, Smith was an unaffiliated candidate in the 2019 Peterborough by-election, receiving five votes (0.01%) and again coming last, this time out of fifteen candidates.

He stood against the Prime Minister Boris Johnson in Uxbridge and South Ruislip in the 2019 General Election as an independent, receiving eight votes and finishing eleventh of twelve candidates.

He stood against the Labour Party leader Keir Starmer in Holborn and St. Pancras in the 2024 General Election, finishing last out of twelve candidates with 19 votes.

== Activism ==
In August 2014, Smith camped outside the holiday home of Prime Minister David Cameron, in Daymer Bay, Cornwall. Smith was briefly arrested after using a megaphone in an attempt to speak to Cameron the previous day.

In September 2014, Smith and fellow activist Carol Wheeler protested outside the home of Charles Walker, the MP for Broxbourne. Smith said, "My children are growing up without a father, I want a review of my case, or for someone to bring it up for debate – to give fathers equal rights, ending secrecy in Family Courts and judgements on balance of probability." Walker spoke of the protest in Parliament as a point of order, saying, "I recognise the right to protest, but the use of a loud-hailer made it almost impossible to hold a conversation with those visiting my surgeries."

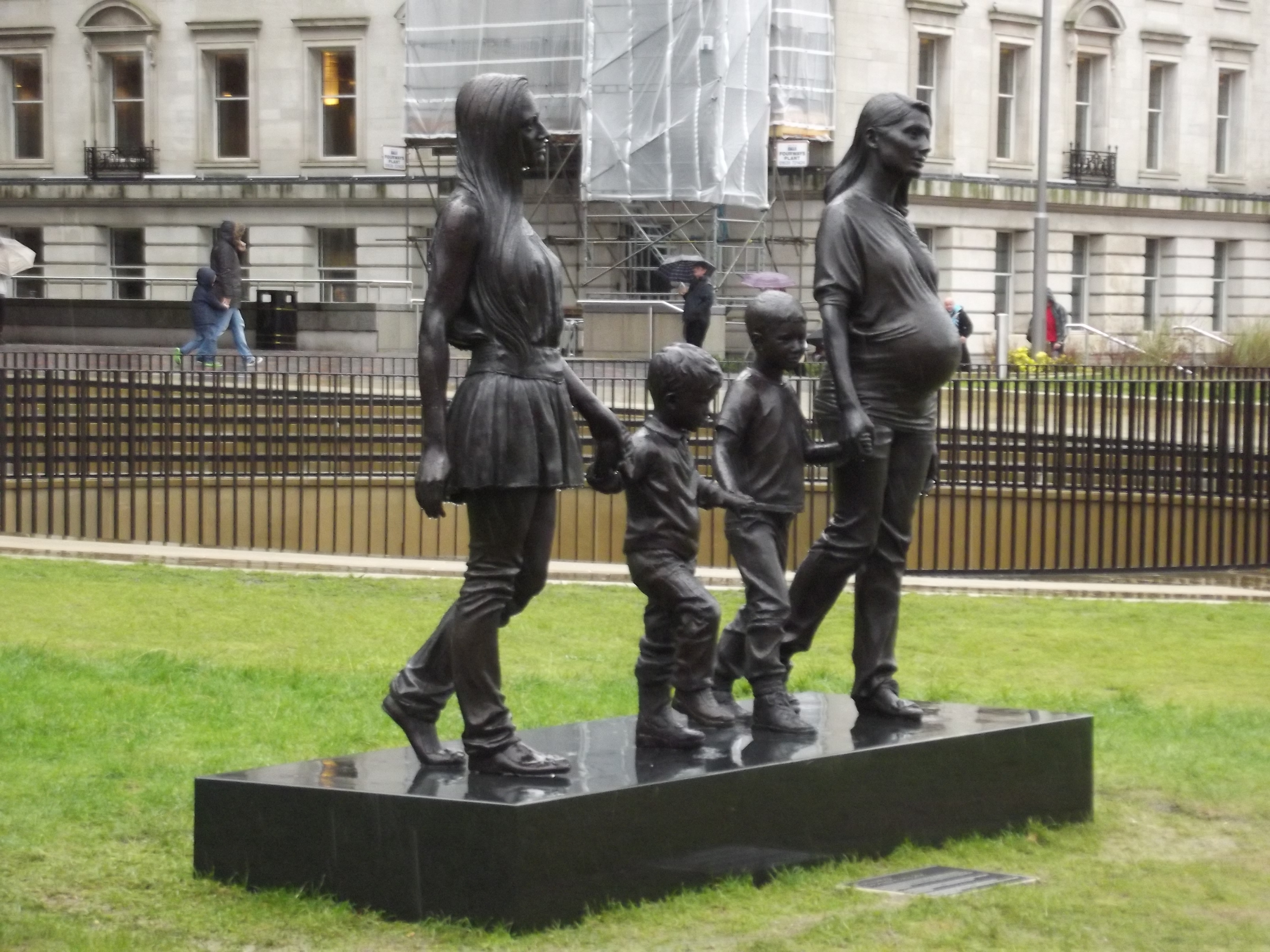
A Real Birmingham Family by Gillian Wearing

In November 2014, Smith, accompanied by Wheeler, covered the A Real Birmingham Family statue with a white sheet and pictures of his own two daughters in protest at no father being included in the statue. Smith said "They've depicted the normal family with no fathers. There's nothing wrong with single mothers, but this statue is saying one person can do both jobs, and I believe kids are always better off with both parents in their lives." The director of the Ikon Gallery, Jonathan Watkins, said of Smith's protest after meeting with him, "We had a good exchange of ideas, he has his take on things, and I have my take on things. I think it's great that somebody has the freedom to express themselves. It's all good, it's part of this democratic society that we cherish."

In December 2014, Smith, along with other protesters from New Fathers 4 Justice, carried out a protest at the Witney constituency home of Prime Minister David Cameron, that resulted in Smith and the other protesters being issued with an harassment order. In a video taken by the protesters, Cameron told the group, "I really think you've made your point and you can go now. You are frightening my children and the neighbours and that's not fair." Smith said, "We have been protesting within the law, we haven't been using a loud hailer and were within our rights to be there" and "I'm not going to give up".

In February and March 2015, Smith carried out several protests alone and with others aimed at longserving Labour MP Harriet Harman and the Labour pink bus campaign. Starting in Stevenage at the launch of the campaign, Smith first confronted Harman in Asda and then again later in the day whilst wearing a T-shirt bearing the slogan "This is what a victim of feminism looks like". Smith said, "You're dividing up men and women ... you're making it them versus us. Are you thinking of getting blue van?" Smith also confronted Harman in Croydon, Cambridge and Gloucester where Smith said, "Fathers in this country falsely accused of domestic violence are lower down the scale when it comes to rights than a convicted paedophile. I haven't seen my children for four years. I have tried everything else so I have to protest like this." When asked whether she would take the time to listen to Smith's story, Harman said: "I have talked to fathers' groups over the years and I know what they are protesting about. He [Smith] is protesting about his own family situation and that is not something that should be decided by politics. That is something for the family court."

In March 2015, after asking Labour leader Ed Miliband a question at a question-and-answer session in Rotherhithe, Smith along with other New Fathers 4 Justice protesters were involved in an altercation outside. It was originally alleged that Miliband was "punched and shoved". New Fathers 4 Justice later released a video showing Miliband getting in the car unimpeded and smiling throughout. Smith told BuzzFeed News: "We were there because he didn't answer my question on shared parenting. I think as long as you don't block his path and he's not scared, it's OK to raise your voice and be heard."

On Father's Day 2015, Smith and another protester climbed Westminster Abbey and unfurled banners to highlight fathers' rights.

In October 2015, Smith climbed onto the roof of the home of Chris Grayling, the leader of the House of Commons.

On 30 November 2015, Smith climbed onto the roof of the Queen's Gallery at Buckingham Palace along with fellow campaigner Martin Mathews and remained on the roof for several hours before giving themselves up.
