= Harleyford Road Community Garden =

Urban garden in Vauxhall, London

Coordinates: 51.4846°N 0.1189°W

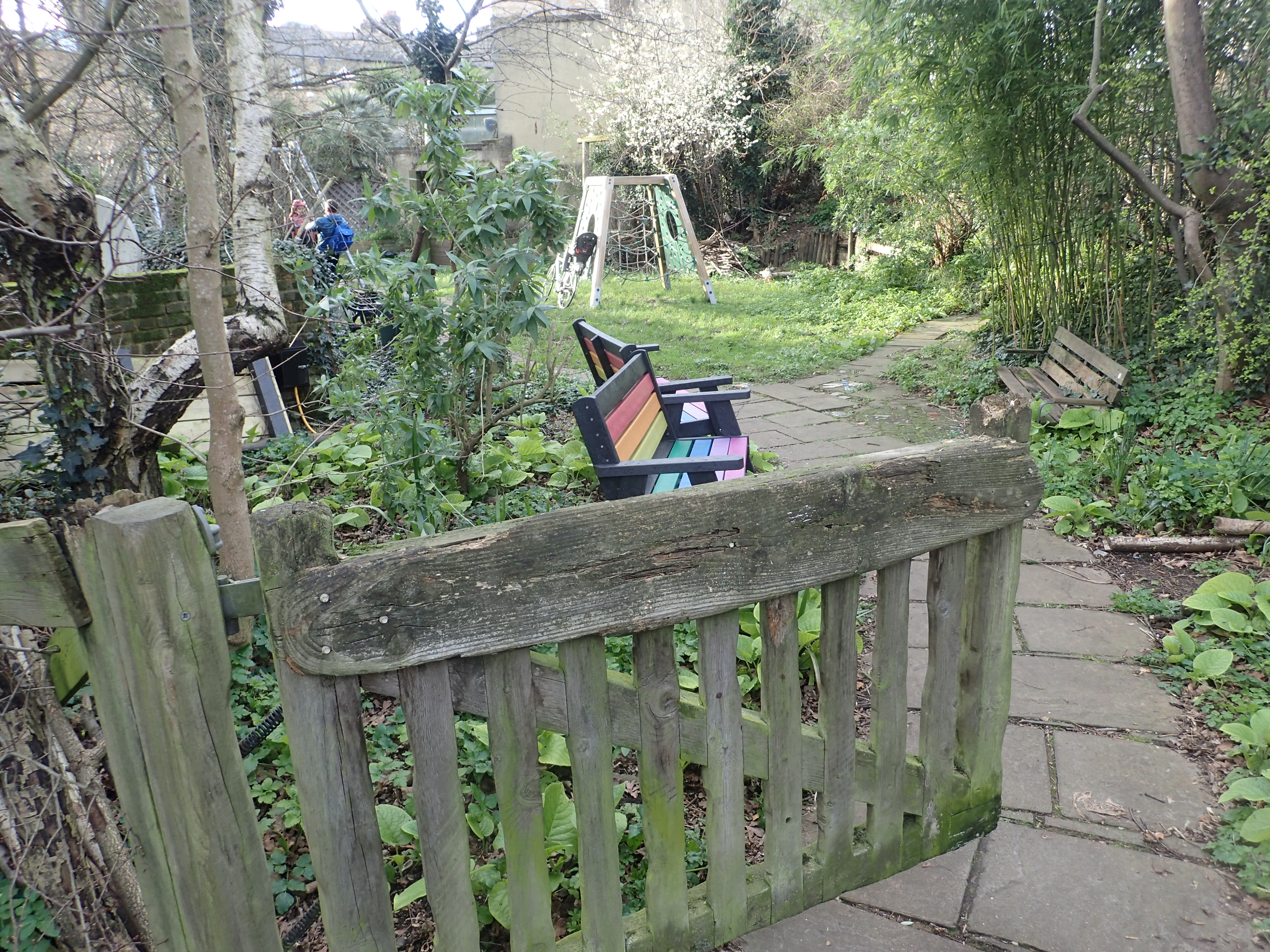
A pathway within the garden

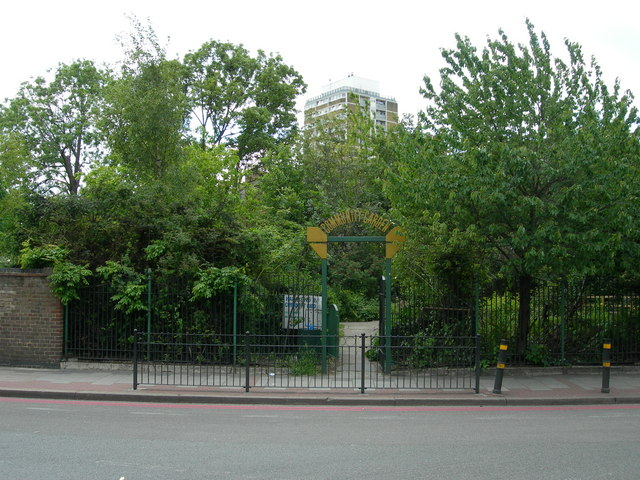
Street entrance to the garden from Harleyford Road

Harleyford Road Community Garden is a community garden in Vauxhall, London. It was created in 1986 on a derelict site, developed from an earlier vegetable garden created by residents.

It is adjacent to, and can be accessed from, Bonnington Square, which also has its own community garden.
