= Roger Crawford (activist) =

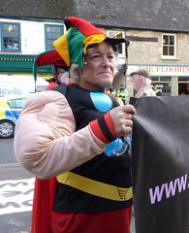
- Crawford dressed as a jester.
- Born: 1948 (age 77–78); Greenford, London, England
- Organization: New Fathers 4 Justice
- Notable work: Rebel Without A Clue, The Jester's Tale
- Political party: Equal Parenting Alliance
- Movement: Fathers' rights
- Website: rogercrawford.blogspot.com

Roger 'The Court Jester' Crawford is a British author and fathers' rights activist. Born in the autumn of 1948, he was adopted as a baby and given up by his birth parents who were not married and extremely poor.

After many years fighting to see his daughter though the Family Court System Roger became a fathers' rights activist with New Fathers 4 Justice.

In 2014 he wrote his first book Rebel Without A Clue published in 2015. The book details his life, his experiences in Oxford Family Court which led him into protesting on various roofs with New Fathers 4 Justice and his election campaign for the Equal Parenting Alliance.

== Political activity ==
In the 2010 General Election, Crawford stood as a candidate for the Equal Parenting Alliance in the Oxford East constituency. Prior to election day Crawford put a half-page advert in the Oxford Mail which read 'Now for Something Completely Different – Don't Vote for Me (if you want a Politician)’. He polled 73 votes (0.1%).

== Activism ==
In June 2009, Roger Crawford and Paul Smith held a protest at Oxford's Carfax Tower dressed as a superhero and a court jester to campaign for fathers' rights.

In April 2010, Denis the Menace, Bananaman and Captain Equality were among the superheroes who travelled through Oxfordshire as part of a New Fathers for Justice demonstration. About 40 fathers – and some mothers – from across the country gathered in the centre of Oxford. Activists travelled the streets in two battle buses before heading to Witney to Conservative Party leader David Cameron's constituency office, where they met Henry Bellingham, Conservative shadow spokesman for justice, who spoke to them for thirty minutes.

In June 2010, Crawford demonstrated with other fathers outside Justice Secretary and Rushcliffe MP Ken Clarke's home in West Bridgford. Dressed as superheroes they demanded a more transparent legal system.

In July 2010, a protest, dubbed 'Witney’s Glastonbury Festival of Fatherhood', thirty activists including Roger camped on Wood Green, in Woodstock Road, Witney for the weekend.

In August 2010, Roger Crawford, dressed as a court jester, Archi Ssan, as the Incredible Hulk, and Jeremy Pogue as Superman scaled David Cameron's constituency office roof in Witney.

In July 2011, for the second time Roger and two other members of the New Fathers 4 Justice dressed as superheroes scaled the Prime Ministers constituency office in Witney. The protesters were Roger Crawford, Jeremy Pogue, of Cefn Hengoed, South Wales, and Archit Ssan of London. The protest marked the start of the group's "CON-DEM(N) CAMERON" campaign" to change family law to give fathers equal status to see their children on separation or divorce.
