= Flute Theatre =

Touring theatre company in London, England

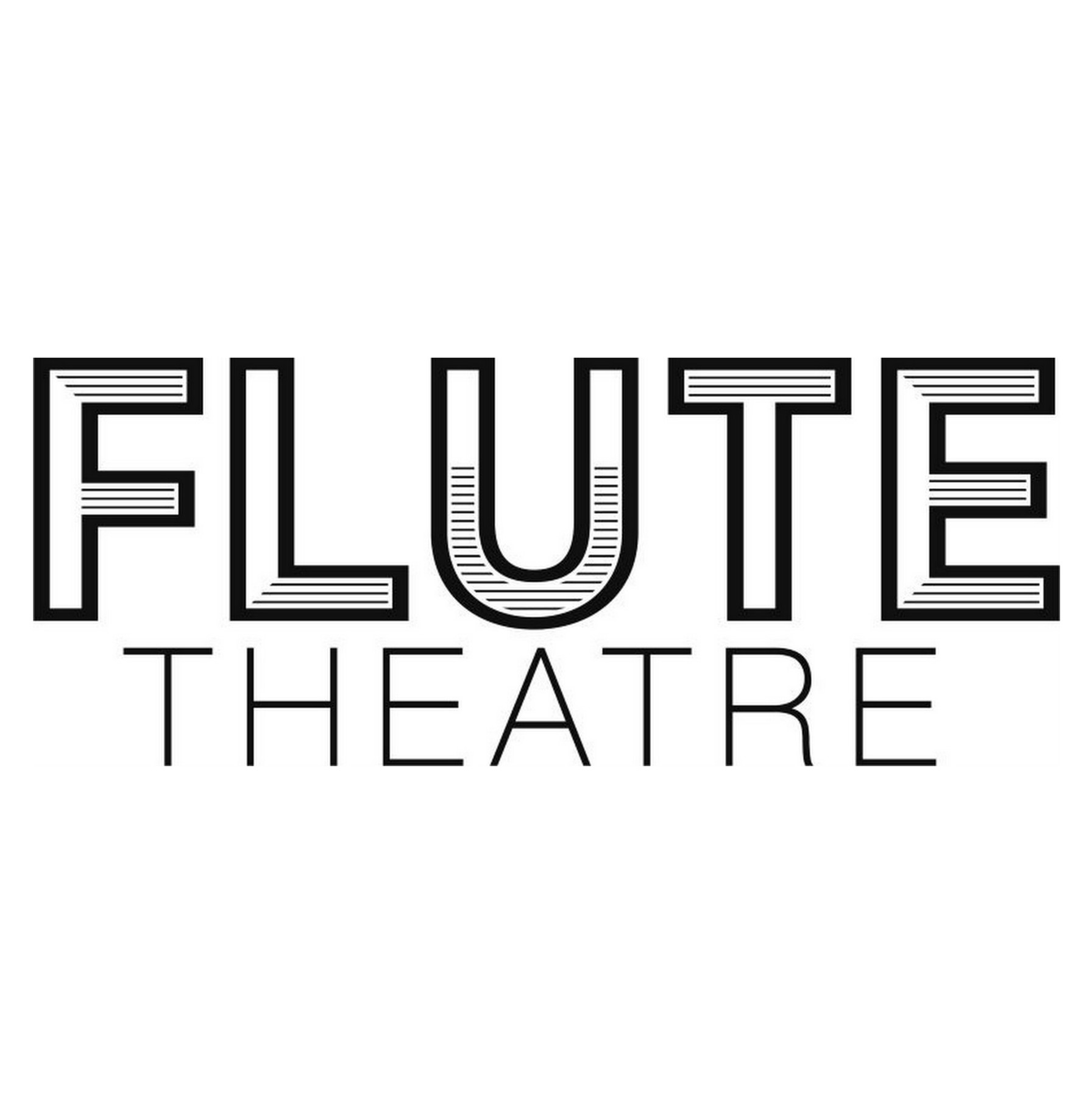
Flute Theatre logo

Flute Theatre is a touring theatre company which performs the works of William Shakespeare to international interactive audiences mainly composed of people who could not ordinarily access the performing arts such as children with autism and their families. The company was founded by Emma Richards and the actress Kelly Hunter MBE, the latter also being the Artistic Director and a performer in the company.

== Origins ==
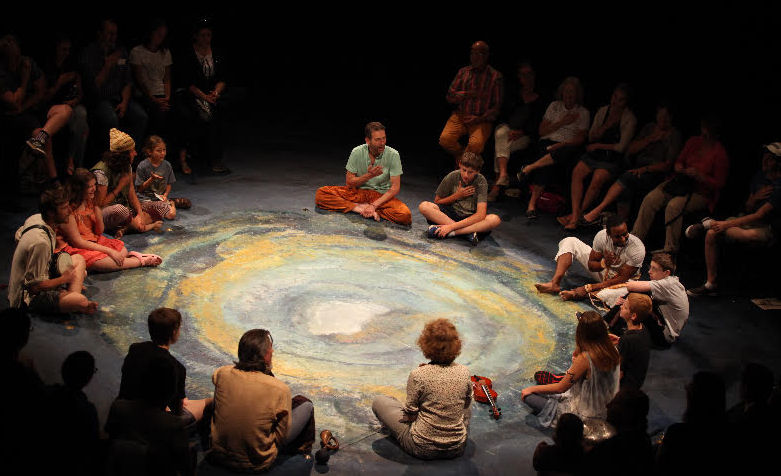
Flute Theatre performing The Tempest for children with autism (2016)

Flute Theatre grew from Hunter's work with children with autism during her time with the Royal Shakespeare Company in 2002, when she set up her own company, Touchstone Shakespeare Theatre (2002-2006), in order to work with children, some with autism, who had little if any access to the Arts. Through this work she created and developed The Hunter Heartbeat Method, a distinctive methodology which uses Shakespeare's rhythmic language and physical gesture to release communicative blocks within children with all levels of autism, including children who are non-verbal.

Hunter said of her work in Flute Theatre:

"I set up Flute to continue my work with children and young people on the autistic spectrum, but also to create performances of Shakespeare for audiences with no access to the arts. I wanted to take away the pomp and ceremony to reveal the essence of the plays... It all started about 15 years ago when I was working at the Royal Shakespeare Company and saw something else in the power of Shakespeare's language. That's when I began working in special schools. At first I was told I wasn't allowed to work with specific children but eventually I convinced them to give it a try and the results were astounding. Now incredibly it's part of a longer study taking place in America, which is incredibly exciting."

The company is produced by Kelly Hunter and Paula Salmon, while Karen Calamaro, Jane Claire, Michael Dobson and Talia Rodgers are the company's trustees.

== Productions ==
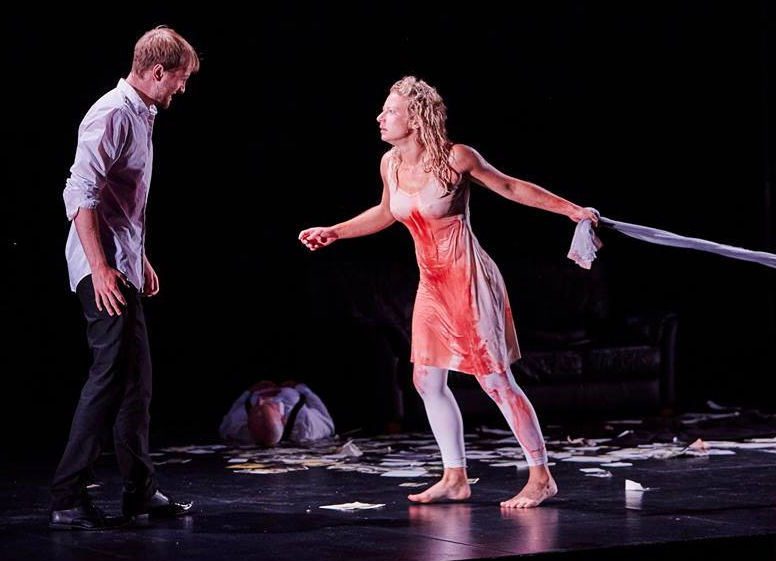
Flute Theatre performing Hamlet, who's there? at Elsinore Castle (2016)

Flute Theatre performing Twelfth Night in Bonnington Square in June 2018

To date Flute has created three productions; The Tempest, for children with autism; Hamlet, who's there?, and a new version of Twelfth Night. The Tempest was first performed in June 2014 in Stratford-upon-Avon and in Columbus, Ohio as a co-production between the Royal Shakespeare Company and Ohio State University. The production had its London premiere in October 2015 as part of the Bloomsbury Festival. The cast includes Royal Shakespeare Company members Kelly Hunter and Greg Hicks.

The company's acclaimed production Hamlet, who's there? began as an exploration of the divided self and the transference of grief originally intended for audiences who had suffered trauma. It premiered at the Gdańsk Shakespeare Festival on 4 August 2015 and is produced in conjunction with English Touring Theatre; it features Kelly Hunter as Gertrude and Greg Hicks as Claudius in an intimate and contemporary production which condenses the action of Hamlet into one evening in a 90-minute play featuring just six actors. Adapted from the original by Hunter, in 2016 the play was performed during an international tour which included the Mercury Theatre, Colchester, the International Shakespeare Festival in Craiova, the Park Theatre in London, Clasicos en Alcala in Spain, the Globe Neuss in Germany and Elsinore Castle. The script is published by Bloomsbury Publishing and is available from Samuel French.

Hamlet, who's there? made its West End premiere at Trafalgar Studios 2 in December 2016 in a co-production with English Touring Theatre.

The company's production of Twelfth Night was directed and adapted by Kelly Hunter with music by Tom Chapman; played with six actors, it premiered in Spain at The Festival de Teatro Clasico de Almagro in 2017 and toured the European Shakespeare festivals during the Spring and Summer of 2018 including the International Shakespeare Festival in Craiova and the Shakespeare im Globe Neuss Festival.
