= Woman to Woman (campaign) =

2015 British political campaign

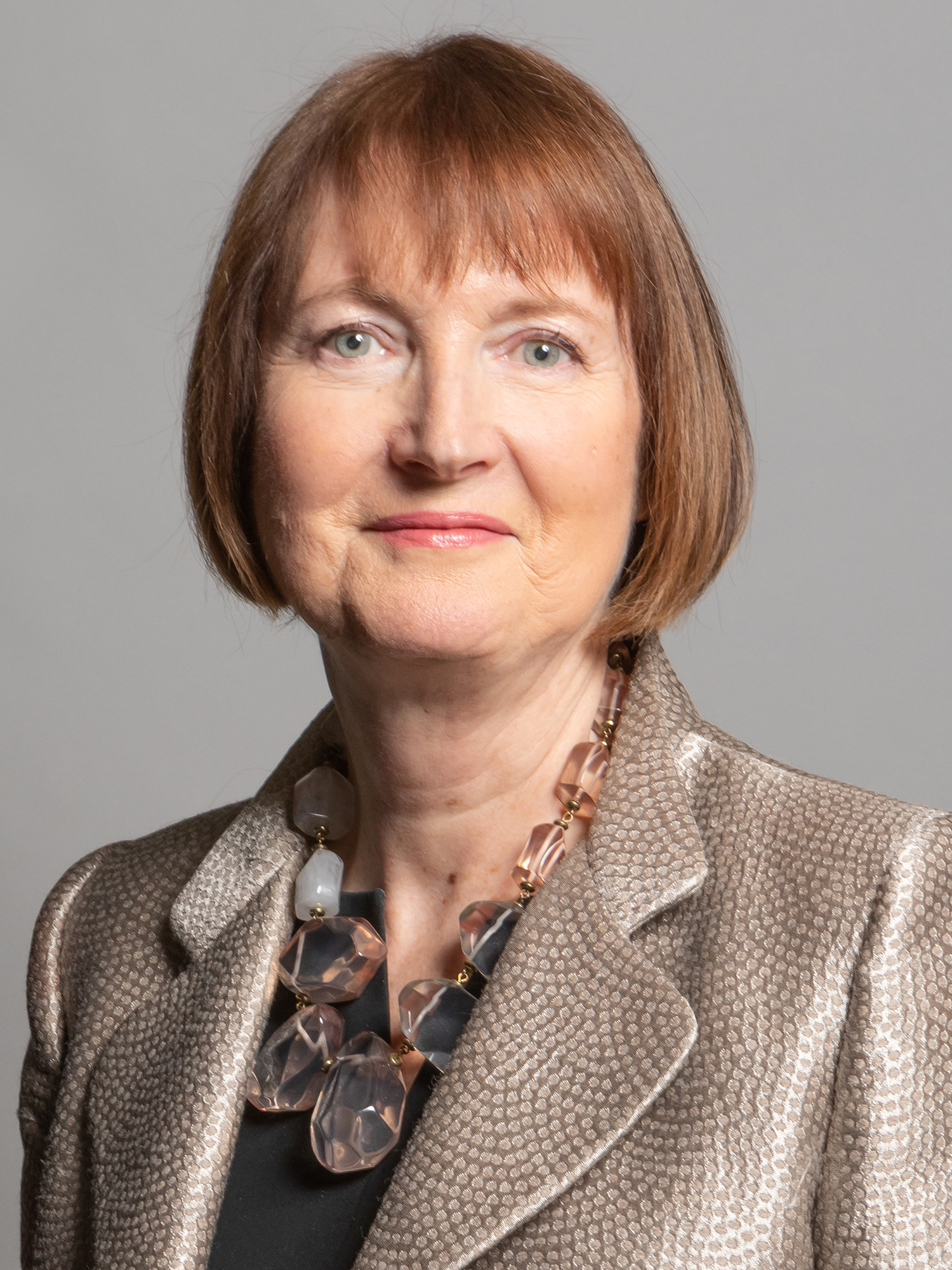
Harriet Harman led her own general election campaign to the main one fronted by Ed Miliband.

Woman to Woman, known in the media as Harriet Harman's Pink Bus, was a political campaign in the United Kingdom for the Labour Party at the 2015 general election. It was led by Deputy Leader of the Labour Party Harriet Harman, and involved a pink battle bus visiting marginal constituencies, promoting Labour policies and rallying support among female voters. It was described by Labour as the party's "biggest ever women's campaign". The Pink Bus was criticised in the media as "sexist and patronising".

The campaign was regarded a failure for the Labour Party, which polled well below expectations in the general election, winning 30.4 per cent of the vote and 232 seats, 24 fewer than its previous result in 2010. Despite this, the voter turnout was 1 per cent higher than 2010, and the overall number of female Labour MPs increased from 81 to 99.

Following the election Harman announced she would stand down from the role once a leadership election had taken place.

== Background ==
Ed Miliband was elected to replace Gordon Brown as Labour leader in 2010 while Harriet Harman remained deputy leader.

== Events ==
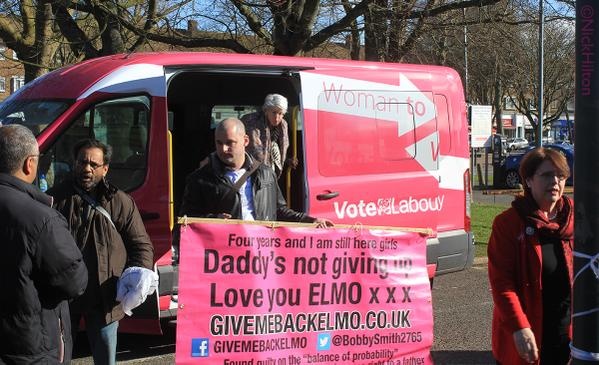
Fathers 4 Justice protesting the Pink Bus

The campaign visited 70 constituencies promoting Labour's "women's manifesto", which focused on five areas the party identified as being important to female voters: childcare, social care, domestic violence, equal pay and political representation. Harman campaigned on enabling voter engagement with the nine million women who did not vote in 2010. The campaign involved a pink 16-seater Ford Transit travelling Britain with female members of Ed Miliband's Shadow Cabinet supporting Labour prospective parliamentary candidates around the country. Another goal of the campaign was to achieve a 50:50 Parliament, an equal split of men and women in the 650-seat House of Commons. There was some debate amongst the media over whether the bus was magenta or fuchsia, before Harman later admitted the colour was pink, a colour commonly regarded as a gender stereotype.

The campaign was launched on 11 February 2015 in Stevenage, a marginal constituency in Hertfordshire. The first stop was an Asda supermarket in the town, where Harriet Harman and Shadow Culture Secretary Gloria De Piero talked to shoppers and store employees. The same day during Prime Minister's Questions, David Cameron said the campaign was evidence that Labour "can't talk to women because they've got a pink bus touring the country". Harman appeared on Channel 4 News and debated The Guardian columnist Zoe Williams about the election campaign. Other constituencies visited in February included Bedford and Cambridge.

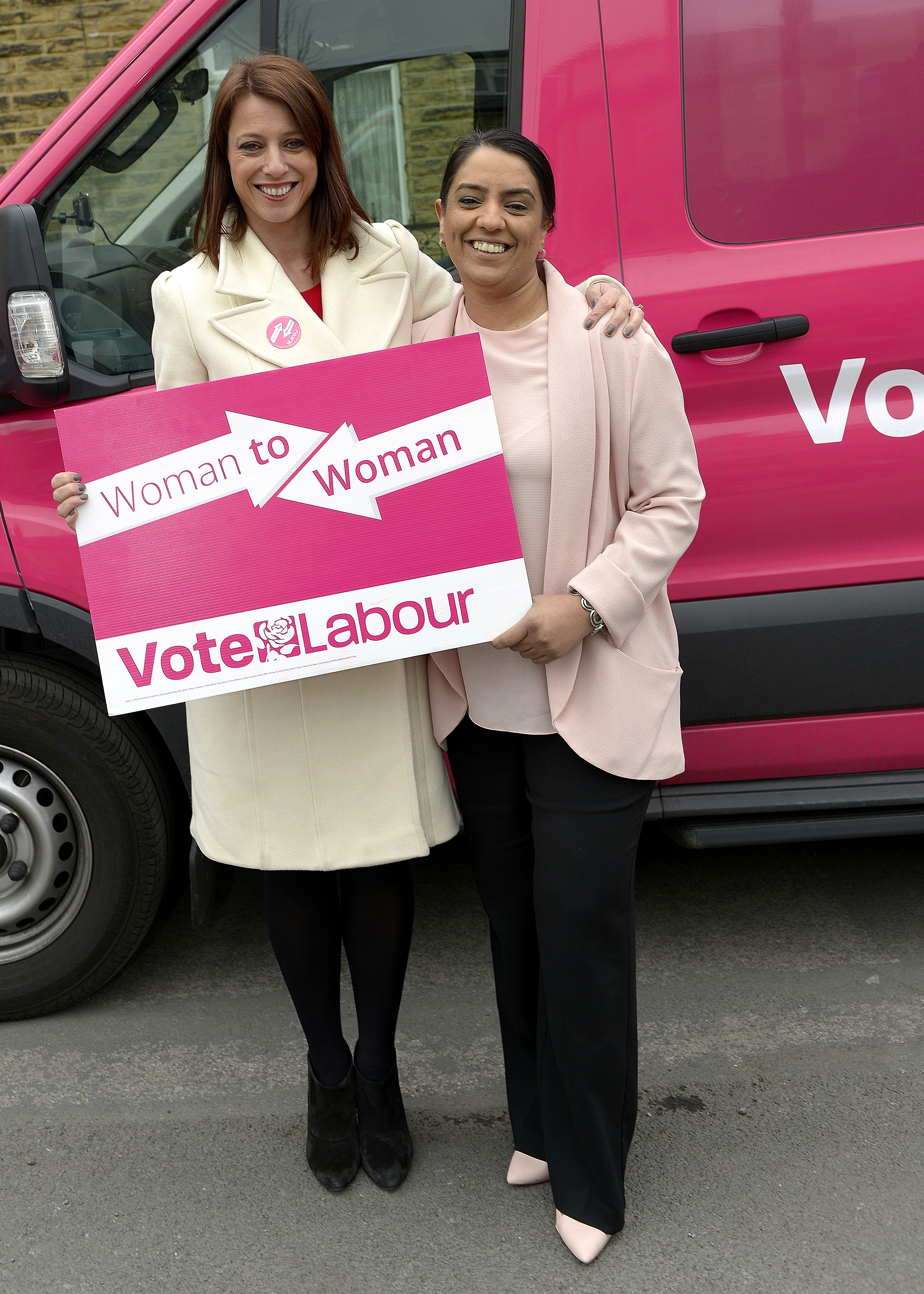
Labour MPs Gloria De Piero and Naz Shah campaigning in Bradford

In March, the campaign made a stop at a Morrisons supermarket in Rothwell in West Yorkshire, another marginal constituency.

In April the campaign stopped in Stockton South. The same month, Alexandra Topping from The Guardian spent a day on the bus with the campaign.

== Protests ==
The campaign was protested by activists from New Fathers 4 Justice. Fathers' rights activist Bobby Smith first confronted Harman in Asda in Stevenage and then again later in the day whilst wearing a T-shirt that had "This is what a victim of feminism looks like" written on it. Smith said, "You're dividing up men and women ... you're making it them versus us. Are you thinking of getting blue van?" Smith also confronted Harman in Croydon, Cambridge and Gloucester where Smith said, "Fathers in this country falsely accused of domestic violence are lower down the scale when it comes to rights than a convicted paedophile. I haven't seen my children for four years. I have tried everything else so I have to protest like this." When asked whether she would take the time to listen to Smith's story, Harman said: "I have talked to fathers' groups over the years and I know what they are protesting about. He [Smith] is protesting about his own family situation and that is not something that should be decided by politics. That is something for the family court." Gloucestershire Constabulary intervened when the situation became heated.

== Election results ==
The campaign was not very successful as the Conservatives held many of their marginal seats. Constituencies that the bus visited which saw an increased Conservative majority included Bedford, Elmet and Rothwell, Stevenage and Stockton South, but Labour did take many seats from the Liberal Democrats such as Birmingham Yardley and Cambridge. Despite this, the voter turnout was 1 per cent higher than 2010, and the overall number of female Labour MPs increased from 81 to 99.

== Reception ==
The colour pink has connotations to the Mattel doll brand Barbie.

The campaign was mocked as "patronising" by journalists Sophy Ridge and Julia Hartley-Brewer. Former Conservative MP Edwina Currie also criticised the campaign. Ella Whelan wrote in Spiked that the "Barbie bus" was sexist and patronizing. Deputy Prime Minister Nick Clegg also mocked the vehicle as a "Barbie bus" and Conservative MP Caroline Dinenage mockingly said "the wheels have come off the Labour bus". The bus was mocked by the Labour-supporting newspaper Daily Mirror by Fleet Street Fox. The pink bus also spurred online memes, with one referencing the character Elle Woods from the film Legally Blonde. The campaign was covered comedically on Last Week Tonight with John Oliver.

Harman defended the campaign saying, "it's an eye-catching colour. It's identifiable". She also said regarding the colour that the party wanted it to "look conspicuous and therefore a white van was not going to do the job".

== See also ==
- EdStone, another part of the Labour election campaign in 2015
