= A Real Birmingham Family =

Sculpture by Gilliam Wearing

Coordinates: 52.479113°N 1.908175°W

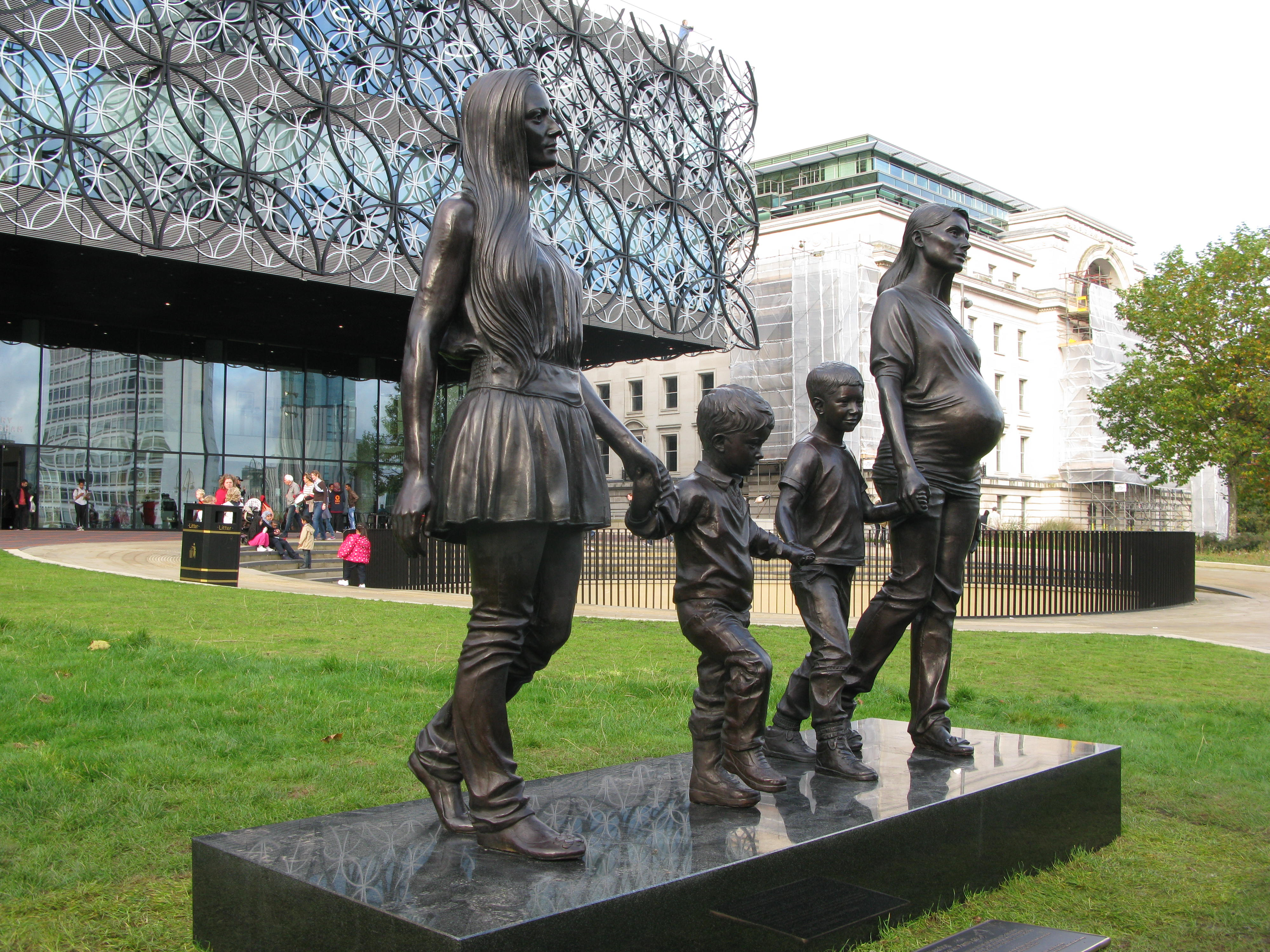
The artwork, with the Library of Birmingham (left) and Baskerville House in the background

A Real Birmingham Family is a public artwork and sculpture by Gillian Wearing, cast in bronze, and erected in Centenary Square, outside the Library of Birmingham, England, on 30 October 2014.

It depicts two local sisters, each single mothers called Roma and Emma Jones, with their two children; Roma's son Kyan and Emma's son Shaye. Emma is depicted as pregnant with a second son, Isaac, who was born before the sculpture was unveiled. A small plaque laid on the ground in front of the work describes it.

In a process begun in 2011, and coordinated by the city's Ikon Gallery, nominations for a "real" local family to model for the sculpture were invited. The Joneses were selected from a shortlist, by an independent panel, in August 2013.

Wearing said:

I really liked how Roma and Emma Jones spoke of their closeness as sisters and how they supported each other. It seemed a very strong bond, one of friendship and family, and the sculpture puts across that connectedness between them. A nuclear family is one reality but it is one of many and this work celebrates the idea that what constitutes a family should not be fixed.

The £100,000 cost of the work was covered by a combination of public money and private donations. The casting was carried out in China. The project follows Wearing's 2008 work, A Typical Trentino Family.

In November 2014 shortly after being unveiled, New Fathers 4 Justice activist Bobby Smith covered the statue with a white sheet and pictures of his two daughters. Smith commented, "They’ve depicted the normal family with no fathers... I believe kids are always better off with both parents in their lives."

The statue went into storage in May 2017, to allow work for the redevelopment of Centenary Square to begin.

== See also ==
- 2014 in art
