= Jolly Stanesby =

British fathers' rights activist

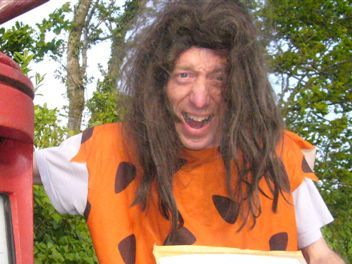

Personal details
- Born: November 1967 (age 58)
- Website: http://jollystanesby.blogspot.co.uk/

Jonathan 'Jolly' Stanesby is a British fathers' rights activist.

== Activism ==
On 21 October 2003, Jonathan "Jolly" Stanesby along with fellow campaigner Eddie "Goldtooth" Gorecki scaled the Royal Courts of Justice, dressed respectively as Batman and Robin. The following day, the group's members protested through London in a military tank in support of Goreckwi and Stanesby.

In September 2003 Jolly climbed 120 feet (36 metres) to the top of a crane in Exeter and stayed up there for three days. During his protest, he told reporters he was a registered child-minder with no criminal record but was not permitted sufficient access to his daughter.

On the morning of 22 December 2003, four campaigners – Eddie Gorecki, Jolly Stanesby, Michael Sadeh and Steve Battlershill – dressed as Father Christmas and climbed Tower Bridge in London. They hung up a banner calling for the resignation of the Minister for Children Margaret Hodge, whom they held responsible for perceived inequalities in family law. The four were charged with conspiracy, but the charge was dropped at the start of the trial a year later.

On 23 January 2004 long tailbacks resulted on both the Devon and Cornwall sides of the Tamar Bridge when Jolly Stanesby and other protesters climbed onto a 20 ft-high gantry. He spent a week camped above the Tamar Bridge but walked free from court.

In February 2004 he demonstrated with another Fathers 4 Justice activist on a gantry at the entrance of the Blackwall tunnel. Both were arrested and Scotland Yard said they had been brought down as it was feared they presented a danger to traffic. Blackwall Tunnel in east London was closed for several hours.

In 2004 Stanesby carried out a "citizen's arrest" of Hodge at a conference, handcuffing himself to her and stating "Margaret Hodge, I'm arresting you for covering up child abuse." Both Stanseby and Jason Hatch (who had also attempted to handcuff himself to Hodge) were later cleared by a jury of charges of false imprisonment.

Dressed as Spider-Man and Batman, Jolly Stanesby, and Gary Swain, climbed onto the top of Plymouth's Crown and County Court in May 2004. The two men unfurled a banner on top of the court reading: "Still the UK's worst family court."

On 29 October 2004 Jolly and other Fathers 4 Justice protestors overpowered police and stormed a conference on family law, setting off smoke bombs and flares and forcing the evacuation of the building. The conference was due to be addressed by Dame Elizabeth Butler-Sloss, the head of the family division at the high court.

The M4 was closed both ways during a five-hour protest on 28 November 2004. Elaine Risk, Michael Downes, Jolly Stanesby, and Darryl Westell, scaled a gantry on the Second Severn Crossing dressed as Santa Claus.

In May 2006 Jolly and five other fathers rights activists protested during the showing of the BBC lottery show "The National Lottery: Jet Set". The show was taken off-air for several minutes after protesters ran from the audience onto the stage displaying posters. The protesters were soon removed from the studio and the lottery draws were hurriedly finished in order to start coverage of the 2006 Eurovision Song Contest.

In June 2006 Jolly Stanesby admitted he was "lucky" to escape with only a fine after trying to disrupt the Queen's birthday celebrations. Stanesby and Tony Ashby another Fathers 4 Justice activist, were arrested at the Trooping the Colour after trying to halt the Queen's carriage as it made its way down The Mall, London.

On 28 November 2006 Judge David Tyzack confronted Jolly Stanesby with a loaded shotgun after Jolly Stanesby climbed onto the roof of his Devon home dressed as Father Christmas. He was threatened by the judge as he unsuccessfully ordered him off the £1 million property. The Judicial Communications Office said the judge "Thought the noise was of a bird trapped on top of his roof and that he did get his shotgun and he did load it and took it outside. When he got outside and looked on the roof he recognised immediately the man and realised he was a protester."

In February 2007 Richard West, Dave White and Jolly Stanesby dressed as cartoon caveman Fred Flintstone climbed on top of Stonehenge to protest about Tory leader David Cameron's comments on absent fathers. The trio, from Fathers 4 Justice, scaled the ancient stones on Salisbury Plain in response to Mr Cameron's remarks that attitudes to gun carrying and absentee fathers had to be altered in the same way attitudes to drink-driving had changed. Once on the monument they unfurled a banner with the message "Drag the family courts out of the Stone Age."

In August 2007 Jolly Stanesby was arrested at gunpoint by a SWAT team after climbing the Lincoln Memorial in Washington, USA. Jolly and Mike Downes scaled the statue wearing Captain America and Batman costumes. Tourists who had gathered around were warned to put their cameras down and stop "encouraging them".

On 8 June 2008, Jolly Stanesby and Mark Harris climbed onto the roof of Labour Party deputy leader Harriet Harman's house wearing superhero-style costumes and calling themselves "Captain Conception" and "Cash Gordon". One of the pair, Mark Harris, said he wanted fathers to have the same right as their mothers' new partners. He also said they would not come down unless Harman read his book, "Family Court Hell". Harris later received a conditional discharge whilst Jolly Stanesby was jailed for two months.

In September 2008 Stanesby dismissed reports that future campaigning will cease after the founder of Fathers 4 Justice (F4J) announced it would close this month. He said "A new organisation has now been launched called New Fathers 4 Justice. We will most definitely keep the organisation going for as long as there's the demand. At the moment there's no way it will end. We're as keen as ever and working on some campaigns for later this year."

On Fathers Day in June 2014 Jolly Stanesby, and Archi Ssan climbed up the face of Exeter Cathedral onto the balcony where they unfurled a banner which read "Family courts do evil". Later in the day Archi Ssan abseiled down the front of the cathedral.

In May 2015 the two protesters who scaled Exeter Cathedral in a protest about equal rights for parents walked away from court after being found not guilty. They appeared at Exeter Magistrates' Court on Thursday (28 May) where two charges of criminal damage against them were dismissed, meaning no fines or punishment were brought against them. Stanesby said his protest in Exeter had been his daughter's idea. However, he said he didn't "think it was a good idea" for her to carry it out, so held the direct action "to support her. My daughter still wants answers and she has written to a number of different organisations, and the judge in our case, but nobody wants to know,". He then accused the Crown Prosecution Service of "clutching at straws" in its attempt to prosecute him for last year's protest.
