= The longest suicide note in history =

Epithet for 1983 UK Labour Party manifesto

"The longest suicide note in history" is an epithet originally used by the British Labour Party member of Parliament Gerald Kaufman to describe his party's 1983 general election manifesto, which emphasised socialist policies in a more profound manner than previous such documents—and which Kaufman felt would ensure that the Labour Party (then in opposition) would lose the election, which it ultimately did.

== Document ==
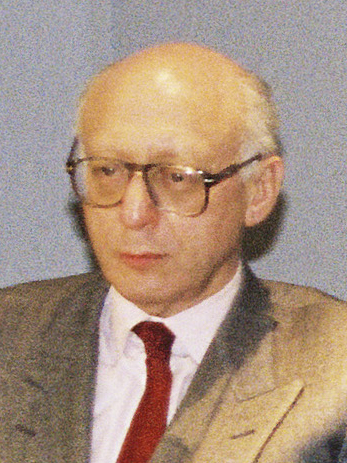
Gerald Kaufman, shown in 1995, coined the phrase.

The New Hope for Britain was a 39-page booklet which called for unilateral nuclear disarmament; higher personal taxation for the rich; withdrawal from the European Economic Community; abolition of the House of Lords; and the re-nationalisation of recently privatised industries such as British Aerospace and the British Shipbuilders Corporation. The manifesto was based on an earlier and much longer policy paper with a similar title, Labour's Plan: The New Hope for Britain.

The epithet referred not only to the orientation of the policies, but also to their marketing. Labour leader Michael Foot decided as a statement on internal democracy that the manifesto would consist of all resolutions arrived at in its party conference.

The document's more left-wing policy proposals, along with the popularity gained by the Conservative prime minister, Margaret Thatcher, over the successful outcome of the Falklands War and the division of the opposition vote between the left-wing Labour Party and the centrist Social Democratic Party – Liberal Alliance, dominated by breakaway Labour MPs on the right wing of the party, contributed to a victory with a substantial majority in Parliament for the right-wing Conservative Party Government. The defeat, Labour's worst result since the 1918 general election, led to a turning point in the history of the party: Foot retired as leader and it subsequently moved towards the centre under the leaderships of Neil Kinnock and John Smith. Then, under the leadership of Tony Blair in the 1990s, it rebranded itself as "New Labour" and Third Way. Blair led Labour back to government in a landslide victory at the 1997 general election, fourteen years and two general election defeats later.

== Other uses of the phrase ==
It has subsequently been used by Peter Gutmann in his paper "A Cost Analysis of Windows Vista Content Protection" to describe the digital rights management schemes in the Windows Vista operating system.

The Dutch People’s Party for Freedom and Democracy politician Mark Rutte used the phrase in reference to the election programme of the Dutch Labour Party, during the May 2010 parliamentary election campaign, deliberately echoing Kaufman.

In the United States The Washington Post columnist Charles Krauthammer compared the Republican Party's 2012 budget in the House of Representatives to the manifesto (in terms of comparable unpopularity) and then remarked of the American House Budget, "At 37 footnotes, it might be the most annotated suicide note in history." The neoconservative writer David Frum compared The Path to Prosperity, proposed by the American congressman Paul Ryan, in a similar light, saying: "This is how a great political party was impelled to base a presidential campaign on the Ryan plan—a plan that has now replaced the 1983 manifesto of the British Labour Party as "the longest suicide note in history."

Labour's decision in 2015 to engrave election promises for the upcoming election on a large stone monument nicknamed the "EdStone" (after its leader at the time, Ed Miliband) was within hours dubbed the "heaviest suicide note in history". During the 2017 election campaign, George Eaton wrote that Labour's 128-page manifesto for the election would be dismissed as "the new 'longest suicide note in history'".

In 2025, The Atlantic published an essay by Anne Applebaum titled “The Longest Suicide Note in American History,” applying the phrase to the Trump administration’s National Security Strategy.

== See also ==
- List of Labour Party (UK) general election manifestos
