= Greg Hicks =

English actor (born 1953)

- Born: 27 May 1953 (age 73); Leicester, England, U.K.
- Education: Rose Bruford College
- Occupation: Actor

Greg Hicks (born 27 May 1953) is an English actor. He completed theatrical training at Rose Bruford College and joined The Royal Shakespeare Company in 1976. He was nominated for a 2004 Laurence Olivier Theatre Award in the category "Best Actor of 2003" for his performance in Coriolanus at the Old Vic and was awarded the 2003 Critics' Circle Theatre Awards (Drama) for Best Shakespearian Performance in the same role.

Hicks has practised the Brazilian hybrid of martial arts and dance capoeira, as well as the Japanese dance-theatre form butoh. He has said that he started to explore the physicality associated with these disciplines in a masked production of Oresteia (1981), directed by his mentor at the National Theatre, Peter Hall. In 2016, he toured with Flute Theatre as Claudius in a production of Hamlet, who's there? written for interactive audiences.

== Selected stage performances ==
- Royal Shakespeare Company:
  - Julius Caesar (2001) as Brutus
  - Merry Wives of Windsor (2002) as Dr Caius
  - Coriolanus (2002) as Coriolanus
  - Hamlet (2004) as Ghost/Player King/Gravedigger
  - Macbeth (2004) as Macbeth
  - Julius Caesar (2009) as Julius Caesar
  - The Winter's Tale (2009) as Leontes
  - King Lear (2010) as King Lear
  - Hamlet (2013) as Claudius/Ghost
  - All's Well That Ends Well (2013) as King of France
- Other:
  - Acastos at the National Theatre (1980)
  - The Romans in Britain, as Marban, a druid, at the National Theatre (1980)
  - The Oresteia, as Orestes, at the National Theatre and Epidavros, Greece (1982) and Channel 4 (1983)
  - Coriolanus, as Tullus Aufidius, National Theatre, (1984)
  - The Homecoming, as Teddy, at the Comedy Theatre, London (1991)
  - Messiah at the Old Vic (2002) as Christ
  - Bacchai, as Dionysus, at the National Theatre (2003)
  - Missing Persons: Four Tragedies and Roy Keane by Colin Teevan at the Jermyn Street Theatre (2006) as various characters
  - Tamburlaine at the Barbican (2005) as Tamburlaine
  - An Enemy of the People at the Arcola Theatre (2008) as Dr Thomas Stockmann
  - In Blood: The Bacchae at the Arcola Theatre (2009)
  - Clarion, Arcola Theatre, (2015)
  - Hamlet, who's there? as Claudius, with Flute Theatre (2016)
  - Richard III (title role) Arcola (2017)
  - Ghosts at the Sam Wanamaker Playhouse (2023) as Jacob Engstrand
  - The Dream of a Ridiculous Man at the Marylebone Theatre (2024) solo performance adapted from the Fyodor Dostoevsky short story

== Partial filmography ==
- Northanger Abbey 1987 (TV)
- Fortunes of War 1987 (TV)
- Bergerac (TV)
- Maigret 1992 (TV)
- Agatha Christie's Marple 2006 (TV)
- Waking the Dead 2007 (TV)
- Midsomer Murders 2011 (TV)
- Snow White & the Huntsman 2012
- The Bible 2013 (TV)
- Son of God 2014
