= New Fathers 4 Justice =

New Fathers 4 Justice (NF4J)
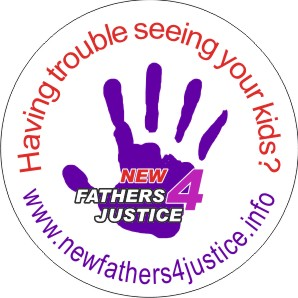
- Founded: 2008
- Purpose: Non profit organisation/Protest group
- Location: UK
- Method: Direct Action
- Website: http://newfathers4justice.co.uk/

New Fathers 4 Justice is a UK-based direct action fathers' rights group campaigning for the rights of fathers to see their children. It is a splinter group of Fathers 4 Justice, founded in September 2008 by activists who were left awaiting trial when Fathers 4 Justice was shut down by Matt O'Connor. Like Fathers 4 Justice, members of New Fathers 4 Justice often protest while wearing superhero costumes.

== Activities ==
=== 2008 to April 2010 ===
The group's first protest was held on 19 September 2008 in Bristol, at the constituency office of Labour MP and Health Minister Dawn Primarolo. The protest was motivated by Primarolo's support of the Human Fertilisation and Embryology Act of 2008.

In February 2009 Richard West climbed on Pylon at Exeter Racecourse where Ben Bradshaw was hosting an equality meeting. In June, Roger Crawford and Paul Smith held a protest at Oxford's Carfax Tower.

In April 2010, about 40 fathers – and some mothers – from across the country gathered in the centre of Oxford as part of an NF4J demonstration. Participants travelled the streets in two battle buses before heading to Witney to Conservative Party leader David Cameron's constituency office, where they met Henry Bellingham, Conservative shadow spokesman for justice, who spoke to them for 30 minutes.

=== May 2010 to July 2016 ===
Soon after David Cameron was elected PM in May 2010, protesters rallied outside the home of David Laws, the Chief Secretary to the Treasury, asking him to support their campaign to open up the family courts, a move which would save taxpayers millions of pounds.

In June, the group demonstrated outside the home of Ken Clarke, the Justice Secretary, demanding a more transparent family court system. In July, thirty activists camped on Wood Green, in Woodstock Road, Witney for the weekend, and dubbed it "Witney's Glastonbury Festival of Fatherhood". In August, Roger Crawford, Archi Ssan, and Jeremy Pogue scaled David Cameron's constituency office roof in Witney.

In July 2011, NF4J member Garry Roe confronted Ken Clarke outside his home, using a megaphone to question Clarke about the Family Justice Review while he and his wife unloaded shopping from their car. Roe, who was dressed as the vigilante crime-fighter Batman, also tried to "Dad arrest" Clarke. Later that month, three members of NF4J scaled David Cameron's constituency office in Witney for the second time. The protesters were Roger Crawford, Jeremy Pogue, and Archit Ssan. The protest marked the start of the group's "CON-DEM(N) CAMERON campaign" to change family law to give fathers equal status to see their children on separation or divorce.

In September, Marines on a mission in Afghanistan brandished placards supporting NF4J, calling themselves Commandos4Justice.

In February 2012, NF4J members protested outside the home of Huntingdon MP and Justice Minister Jonathan Djanogly in Alconbury.

On Fathers Day in June 2014, Jolly Stanesby and Archi Ssan climbed up the face of Exeter Cathedral onto the balcony where they unfurled a banner which read "Family courts do evil". Later in the day, Archi Ssan abseiled down the front of the cathedral.

In August, Bobby Smith camped outside the holiday home of the UK Prime Minister David Cameron in Daymer Bay Cornwall; Smith was briefly arrested for using a megaphone after speaking to Cameron the previous day.

In August, Martin Matthews staged a one-man protest on the roof of Justice Secretary Chris Grayling's home. He scaled the roof using a ladder before unfurling a banner reading: "No rights? Go MAD. Mums and Dads United." Later that month, six demonstrators climbed on the Apsley Gate entrance to Hyde Park, central London's biggest, which is adjacent to Apsley House, once the home of the dukes of Wellington. Humanworth activists Steve Dawe and Archi Ssan spent more than a week on top of the arch sleeping inside the monument.

In September, Bobby Smith and fellow activist Carol Wheeler protested outside the home of Broxbourne MP Charles Walker. Smith said he wanted his case reviewed, and an end to "secrecy in Family Courts and judgements on balance of probability."

In October 2014, Dragons RFC rugby player Ian Gough wore a customised Spider-Man scrum cap with NF4J and his son's initials printed on it during a televised match, following claims that he only had limited access to his son.

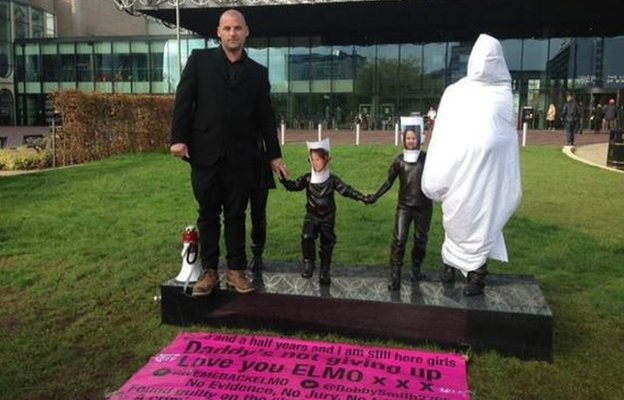
Bobby Smith at Real Family Statue Birmingham

In November 2014, Bobby Smith accompanied by Carol Wheeler covered the A Real Birmingham Family statue with a white sheet and pictures of his own two daughters in protest at no father being included in the statue. Smith said, "They've depicted the normal family with no fathers. There's nothing wrong with single mothers, but this statue is saying one person can do both jobs, and I believe kids are always better off with both parents in their lives."

In December 2014, Bobby Smith and others were issued a harassment order after protesting outside David Cameron's home in Witney. In a video taken by the protesters, David Cameron told the group, "I really think you've made your point and you can go now. You are frightening my children and the neighbours and that's not fair."

In January 2015, protesters seeking extra rights for fathers in family courts set up camp outside the home of MP Chris Grayling, the Secretary of State for Justice. Headed by longtime campaigner Martin Matthews, the group of four lit fires and asked passing motorists for support.

In February and March 2015, Bobby Smith carried out a number of protests alone and with others aimed at Harriet Harman and the Labour pink bus campaign. Starting in Stevenage at the launch of the campaign Smith first confronted Harman in Asda and then again later in the day whilst wearing a T-shirt that had "This is what a victim of feminism looks like" written on it. Smith said 'You're dividing up men and women...you're making it them versus us. Are you thinking of getting blue van?"

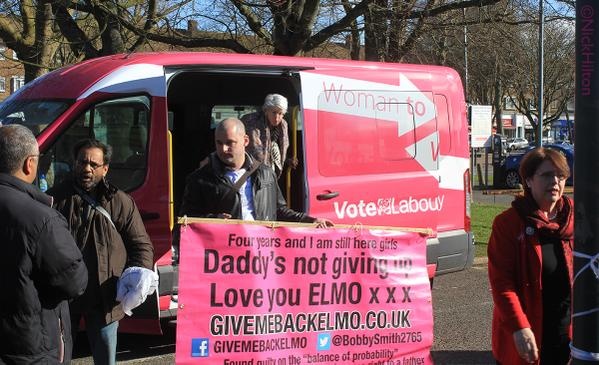
New Fathers 4 Justice confront Harriet Harman's Pink Bus

Smith and Archi Ssan also confronted Harman in Croydon, Cambridge, and Gloucester.

In March, after asking Ed Miliband a question at a Q and A session in Rotherhithe, Smith along with other protesters were involved in an altercation outside. It was originally alleged that Miliband was "punched and shoved". New Fathers for Justice later released a video showing Miliband getting in the car unimpeded and smiling throughout.

In January 2016, while Bobby Smith was appearing at the magistrates' court in Stevenage, three activists climbed onto the roof of the court building to support him. The three were arrested and charged with aggravated trespass. Smith was found guilty of breaching a restraining order by putting photographs of his daughters on Facebook, and found not guilty of two charges of violating a non-molestation order.

=== After July 2016 ===
Theresa May became the Prime Minister in July 2016. In August, Bobby Smith and Martin Mathews staged a protest on the roof of Labour leader Jeremy Corbyn's Islington home.

== See also ==
- Child custody
- Fathers' rights movement in the UK
- Parental alienation
- Parental alienation syndrome
- Pressure groups in the United Kingdom
- Shared parenting
