= Resort to Murder =

1991 British television crime drama series

- Genre: Crime drama
- Created by: Tony McHale
- Directed by: Bruce MacDonald
- Starring: Ben Chaplin; Steven Waddington; Kelly Hunter; Peter Firth; John Stahl; Sean Gilder; David Daker; Brett Fancy
- Composer: Bill Connor
- Country of origin: United Kingdom
- Original language: English
- No. of series: 1
- No. of episodes: 5

Production
- Executive producers: Johan Eliasch; Michael Wearing
- Producer: Barry Hanson
- Cinematography: Graham Frake
- Editor: Angus Newton
- Running time: 50 minutes
- Production company: London Film Productions

Original release
- Network: BBC1
- Release: 27 July – 24 August 1995

Resort to Murder is a five-part British television crime drama series, written and created by Tony McHale, first broadcast on BBC1 on 27 July 1995. The series, directed by Bruce MacDonald, follows Joshua Penny (Ben Chaplin), a post-graduate student whose mother, Harriet, is herself murdered after having been the sole eyewitness to another murder. The series is set in and around Brighton.

Resort to Murder was first commissioned as an eight-part series in 1991 under the working title of Brighton Boy, and took over two years for writer Tony McHale to complete. In 1993, then-head of drama at the BBC, Charles Denton, green-lighted the series and awarded it a £4.5 million budget. The series was filmed over the course of 17 weeks from September to December 1993. Several members of the cast were hand-picked by McHale. After shooting completed, producer Barry Hanson arranged a viewing of all eight episodes for executive producer Michael Wearing, and both concluded following the viewing that "the series just didn't work." Then controller of BBC1, Alan Yentob, was later invited to a viewing of a director's cut of the first three episodes, heavily reworked by Wearing and Hanson. Yentob reportedly told them "he did not want such rubbish on his channel".

Director Bruce MacDonald was then sacked from the project by Yentob, and the series was re-worked into five episodes, with writer McHale heavily involved in the editing process. More than eighteen months after completion, the series was finally listed for transmission on 27 July 1995, with episodes airing at 10pm on Thursdays. The series has never been released on VHS or DVD, although a soundtrack to the series was released via Debonair Records on 7 August 1995.

== Cast ==
- Ben Chaplin as Joshua Penny
- Steven Waddington as Neville Ilingworth
- Kelly Hunter as Lucy Chapman
- Mairead McKinley as Tracey/Adrienne Saunders
- Peter Firth as Peter Dennigan
- Robert Pugh as Danny McCrae
- David Daker as Sam Penny
- Neil Stuke as Lee “Skins” Skinner
- Nigel Terry as Kepler
- Brett Fancy as The Leveller
- John Gillett as David Rossler
- John Stahl as DI Reed
- Sean Gilder as PC/DC Graham
- Eileen Nicholas as Harriet Penny

== Episodes ==
No. overall	No. in series	Title	Directed by	Written by	Original release date	Viewers (millions)
1	1	"Episode 1"	Bruce MacDonald	Tony McHale	27 July 1995	N/A
On the derelict West Pier in Brighton, Harriet Penny witnesses a man dumping a young girl’s body in the water below. Pursued by the killer, she too plummets to her death. The only witness is her husband Sam: the problem is, the police don’t believe his story about a masked man, and suspect he killed his wife. He too is unaware of what Harriet witnessed prior to her death. Joshua, his son, a post-graduate student, returns home to find his father in turmoil, and begins his own investigation. Then, the body of a young girl, foreign language student Anna Lapinski, washes ashore. For the first time, it appears the two cases are linked. Speaking to locals, Joshua manages to identify a witness, Tracey Saunders, who claims to have seen the mysterious man on the night of the murder. But before he can convince her to speak to the police, she is run out of town.
2	2	"Episode 2"	Bruce MacDonald	Tony McHale	3 August 1995	N/A
Joshua's investigations into his mother's murder continue, as he tries to track down Tracey Saunders, who has fled to London to escape from the Leveller. Her sister, Adrienne, comes under pressure from both Joshua and the Boss to provide information on Tracey’s whereabouts. As Joshua begins to dig into his father’s finances, Bailiffs repossess the family flat. As Joshua prepares to leave Brighton to go in search of Tracey, he is pursued.
3	3	"Episode 3"	Bruce MacDonald	Tony McHale	10 August 1995	N/A
Joshua recovers from his beating, and heads to London, where finds himself dragged into the world of Camden's Goth scene in search for Tracey. Neville tries to find Anna Lapinski’s roommate, Sylvana. As Sam’s trial continues, Skins gives a false witness statement on the stand which looks set to confirm Sam’s fate. Tracey decides to return to Brighton to stand as a witness, but is murdered on her return by the Leveller. Joshua decides to investigate Peter Dennigan.
4	4	"Episode 4"	Bruce MacDonald	Tony McHale	17 August 1995	N/A
Joshua interrogates Peter Dennigan, who claims to know who Anna was with on the night of her death. Joshua and Neville are kidnapped by McCrae, but rescued by a timely Customs and Excise raid. Joshua discovers a video which shows Anna being run over shortly before her body was dumped. Skins manages to escape, killing the Leveller in the process. Joshua and Neville pay a visit to Kepler’s shop, where they find a body hidden in a broken freezer.
5	5	"Episode 5"	Bruce MacDonald	Tony McHale	24 August 1995	N/A
With the police firmly on his tail, Kepler decides to cut and run, leaving his girlfriend to spill the tea to Lucy. The video of the hit and run is delivered to the police, but not before Lucy is kidnapped. Neville is hospitalised, leaving Joshua on his own to piece together the final parts of the mystery, to identify and track down the killer.
