= EdStone =

Stone used by UK Labour Party in 2015

The "EdStone" was a large limestone tablet that was commissioned by the Labour Party during the 2015 United Kingdom general election campaign. It was 2.6 metres (8 ft 6 in) tall and featured six election pledges carved into it, together with the Labour logo and a copy of the signature of party leader Ed Miliband. It was much mocked; for example, John Rentoul, a biographer of the former Labour prime minister Tony Blair, described it as the "most absurd, ugly, embarrassing, childish, silly, patronising, idiotic, insane, ridiculous gimmick I have ever seen".

The Labour Party failed to declare the cost of the stone in its election finances report, which led to an investigation by the Electoral Commission that uncovered £150,000 of undisclosed payments by the party during the election. The commission reported that the treasurer had committed two offences and the party was fined.

== Unveiling and reaction ==
The tablet was produced by stoneCIRCLE, a Basingstoke-based stonemasonry company; the firm signed a confidentiality clause. It was rumoured to have cost £30,000, but invoices later showed the cost was £7,614.

The tablet was unveiled on 3 May 2015 in a car park in the marginal constituency of Hastings and Rye, which Labour hoped to take from the Conservative Party. The purpose of the stone was to illustrate Labour's commitment to its promises, contrasting this with the failure of the Liberal Democrats to keep their pledge made during the 2010 general election campaign to abolish tuition fees.

The six pledges written on the stone were:

1. A strong economic foundation
2. Higher living standards for working families
3. An NHS with the time to care
4. Controls on immigration
5. A country where the next generation can do better than the last
6. Homes to buy and action on rents

Miliband had pledged that if Labour won the election the stone would stand in the Downing Street Rose Garden "as a reminder of our duty to keep Labour's promises".

The stone became a source of near universal ridicule. It was unfavourably compared to the stone tablets in the story of Moses and the Ten Commandments, and to a headstone. In a matter of hours users on Twitter had dubbed it the "EdStone".

Boris Johnson, then Mayor of London and the Conservative candidate in Uxbridge and South Ruislip, called it "some weird commie slab", whilst the shadow transport minister Michael Dugher later admitted it was a "12ft, granite, marble, cock-up" (though the tablet was actually limestone). Dan Hodges reported that while watching Miliband unveil the tablet on television, a Labour press officer "started screaming. He stood in the office, just screaming over and over again at the screen. It was so bad they thought he was having a breakdown". A party adviser said after the election that "The only reason it got through 10 planning meetings was because we were all distracted, looking for a way to punch through on the SNP". By the evening it had also been called the "heaviest suicide note in history", a reference to a famous description of Labour's manifesto for the 1983 general election as "the longest suicide note in history".

Lucy Powell, the Labour campaign's vice-chair, was widely thought to have committed a gaffe about the stone, when she said on BBC Radio 5 Live: "I don't think anyone is suggesting that the fact that he's carved [the election pledges] in stone means he's absolutely not going to break them or anything like that".

== Election aftermath and location ==
Labour reportedly had two plans for the tablet's break-up and destruction if the party lost the election: throw the rubble away, or sell Berlin Wall-like chunks to party members to raise money. After Labour performed worse than expected, and the Conservatives won a surprise overall majority, the location of the stone became the subject of widespread speculation. Labour officials refused to disclose its location, for which various newspapers offered rewards. The Daily Telegraph contacted 50 masonry firms in an attempt to find it, whilst the Daily Mail offered a reward of a case of champagne for its location, and The Sun set up a hotline for information.

The disappearance of the EdStone led to joking comparisons in the media with the Ark of the Covenant as portrayed in Raiders of the Lost Ark, in which the Ark is stored in secret in a large warehouse, its location undisclosed.

The Conservatives held the seat in which the stone was unveiled, Hastings and Rye. The sitting MP, Amber Rudd, increased her majority to 4,796, 5.4% greater than her majority in 2010.

As at 15 May 2015 the EdStone was reported to be in storage inside a garage in South London. "There are claims it has been destroyed", The Guardian reported in early June 2015, "but even Miliband's close advisers cannot confirm its fate." In January 2016 two party officials, speaking on condition of anonymity, told Bloomberg News that the stone had been destroyed in the weeks following 7 May 2015, putting an end to eight months of speculation about its whereabouts.

Replicas have been produced. One is at Nevill Holt Hall, the home of the Conservative donor David Ross. In May 2017 it was reported that an EdStone had become a decoration in the Ivy Chelsea Garden restaurant on the King's Road in West London. The restaurant's owners said that it had been bought two years earlier in a charity auction because it would be "fun" to have an "iconic image of the election" in the garden. Steve Vanhinsbergh, co-owner of stoneCIRCLE, doubted this was the authentic stone, for practical reasons and the fact that he was "99% sure" it had been demolished.

Initial enquiries aimed to determine why spending incurred on the stone tablet was missing from the Labour Party's campaign spending return. It was established that these payments, totalling £7,614, were missing from the party's return and the Electoral Commission launched an investigation which uncovered other undeclared expenses. The Commission concluded that the party's spending return was incomplete, as it omitted 74 payments totalling £123,748, along with 33 separate invoices totalling £34,392. The registered treasurer of the party, Iain McNicol, was charged with two offences under the Political Parties, Elections and Referendums Act 2000 and the Labour Party was fined £20,000. At the time, this was the largest fine the commission had imposed since it began operations in 2001.

== See also ==
- Woman to Woman (campaign), another part of the Labour election campaign in 2015
