= Campaign bus =

Bus used during political campaigns

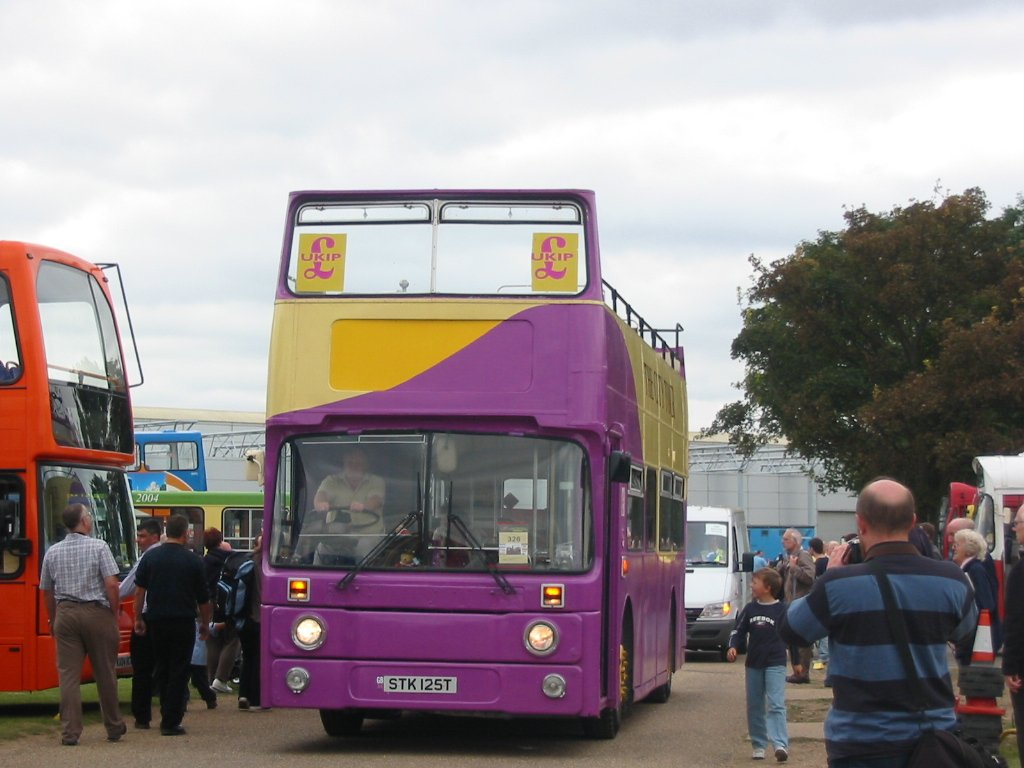
A campaign bus for UKIP

A campaign bus (also referred to as a battle bus in the UK) is a bus used as both a vehicle and a center of operations during a political campaign, whether for a specific candidate, a political party, or a political cause. A campaign bus can also transport members of the press covering a candidate's campaign. In the UK, they are shared by reporters, political commentators and a politician, usually a party leader, to give them all access to each other as they traverse the country making speeches and other engagements during a general election campaign. In theory, the mutual advantage is that journalists get close access to politicians, and politicians can convey their message more directly to those reporting them. The modern use of campaign buses is often calculated to bring to mind whistle stop train tours that political candidates had historically used to reach large numbers of voters while campaigning by train.

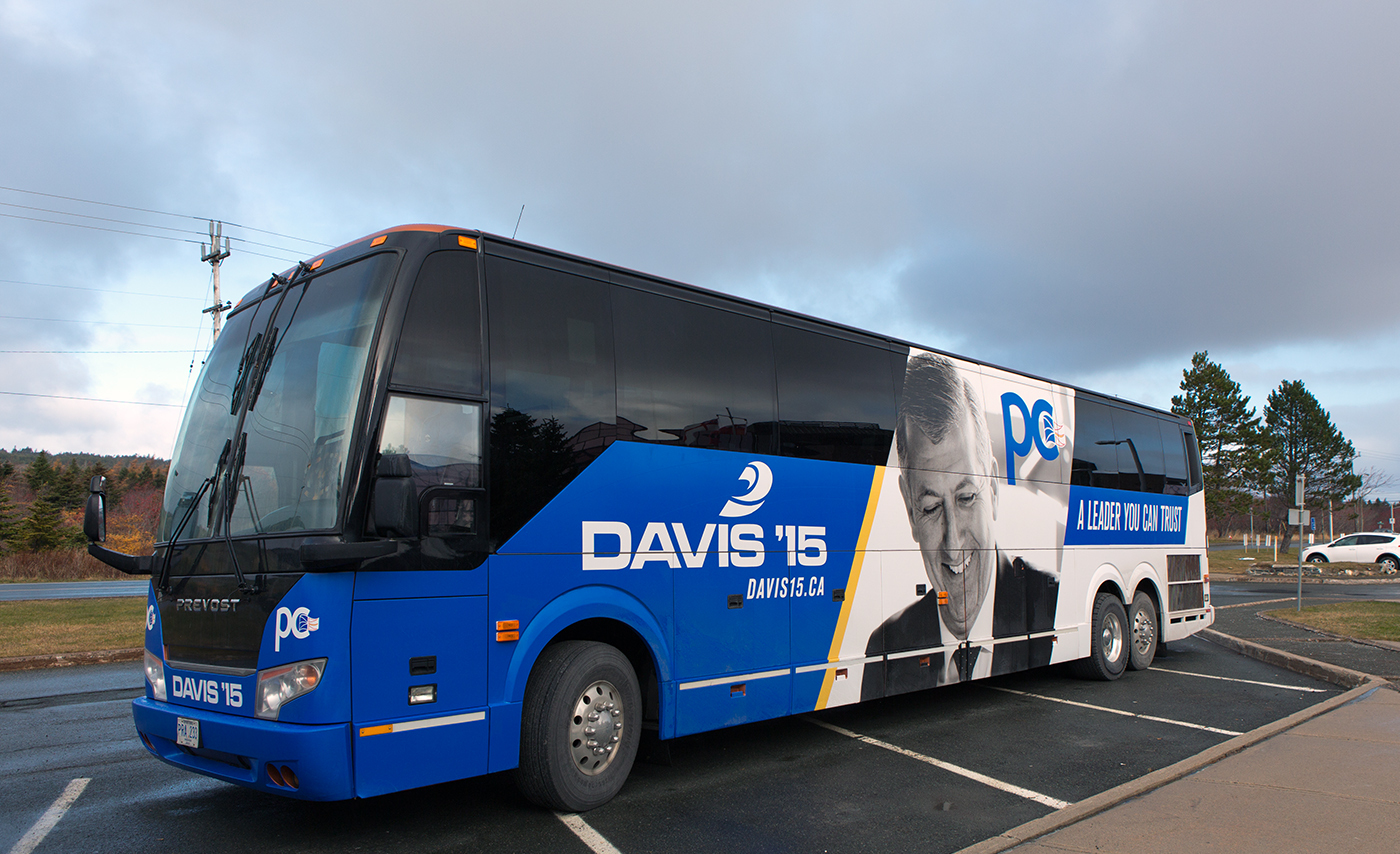
Campaign bus depicting Newfoundland and Labrador Premier Paul Davis

The use of the campaign bus began at least as early as the 1940s, when The New Republic reported that 1948 presidential contender Thomas E. Dewey was "waylaid... in his campaign bus" by a charmed female admirer who "told him she would vote for him because he was 'so pink and pretty'". John F. Kennedy's "Alliance for Progress" theme was coined on board a campaign bus travelling through Texas in 1960. Candidates may provide interviews to the press or relax on the campaign bus. In 1972, the presidential campaign of Senator Ed Muskie was damaged when a reporter wrote that Muskie's wife, Jane Muskie, "tried to cheer up a campaign bus with the flippant suggestion that everybody swap risque stories".

"Battle buses" were first seen in the UK in the late 1970s. Before that, reporters followed party leaders in separate cars. The battle bus was a significant feature of the 1987 general election as David Owen and David Steel of the SDP–Liberal Alliance each crisscrossed the country in matching battle buses, each painted bright yellow. In the 2015 general election, Harriet Harman's Woman to Woman campaign was notable for its bright pink battle bus.

Some buses may have names relating to the general theme of the campaign; John McCain traveled aboard a campaign bus named the "Straight Talk Express" during his 2000 presidential campaign.

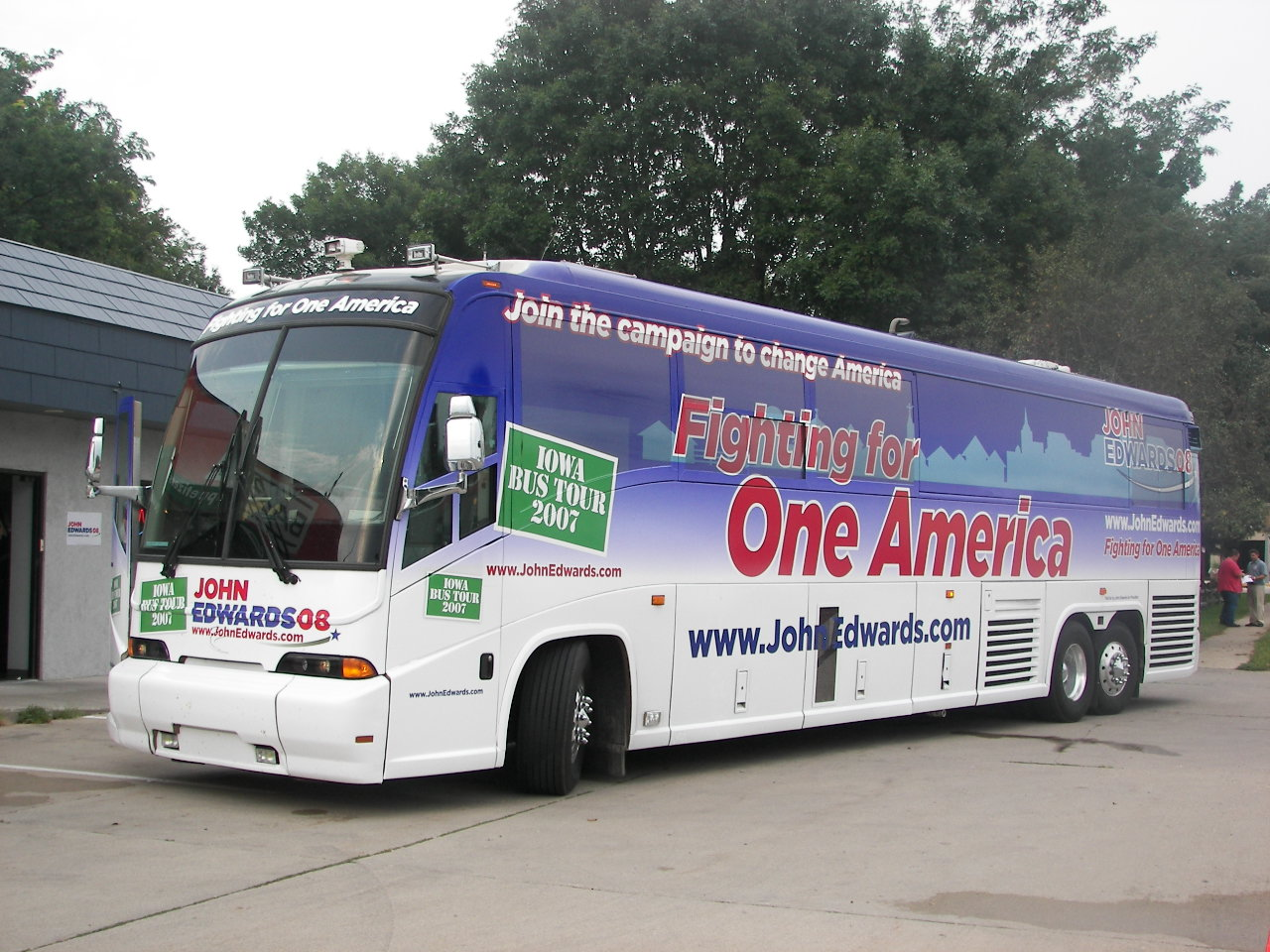
U.S. Senator John Edwards campaign bus in 2008

Campaign buses are used in many countries. Luiz Inácio Lula da Silva, known popularly as Lula, used this method of campaigning extensively, and was elected President of Brazil. Over the course of his campaign, "Lula traveled to 350 cities and towns in twenty-three states, in separate campaign bus tours". In the United Kingdom, John Major "adopted the old-fashioned practice of addressing the public from a 'soap box' erected outside his campaign bus". Cuauhtémoc Cárdenas also used a campaign bus to great effect during his 1988 campaign for President of Mexico, which although unsuccessful led to the downfall of single-party rule in Mexico. In Canada party leaders often lease coaches with sides decorated with the party name or their own names. The buses are used to travel between destinations that do not require air travel. Members of the media and other campaign officials may travel along with the party leader.

== See also ==
- Sound trucks in Japan
- Tour bus
- Sleeper bus
