= The Oval Gasholders =

Gasholder by the Oval Cricket Ground, London

Coordinates: 51.4851°N 0.1140°W

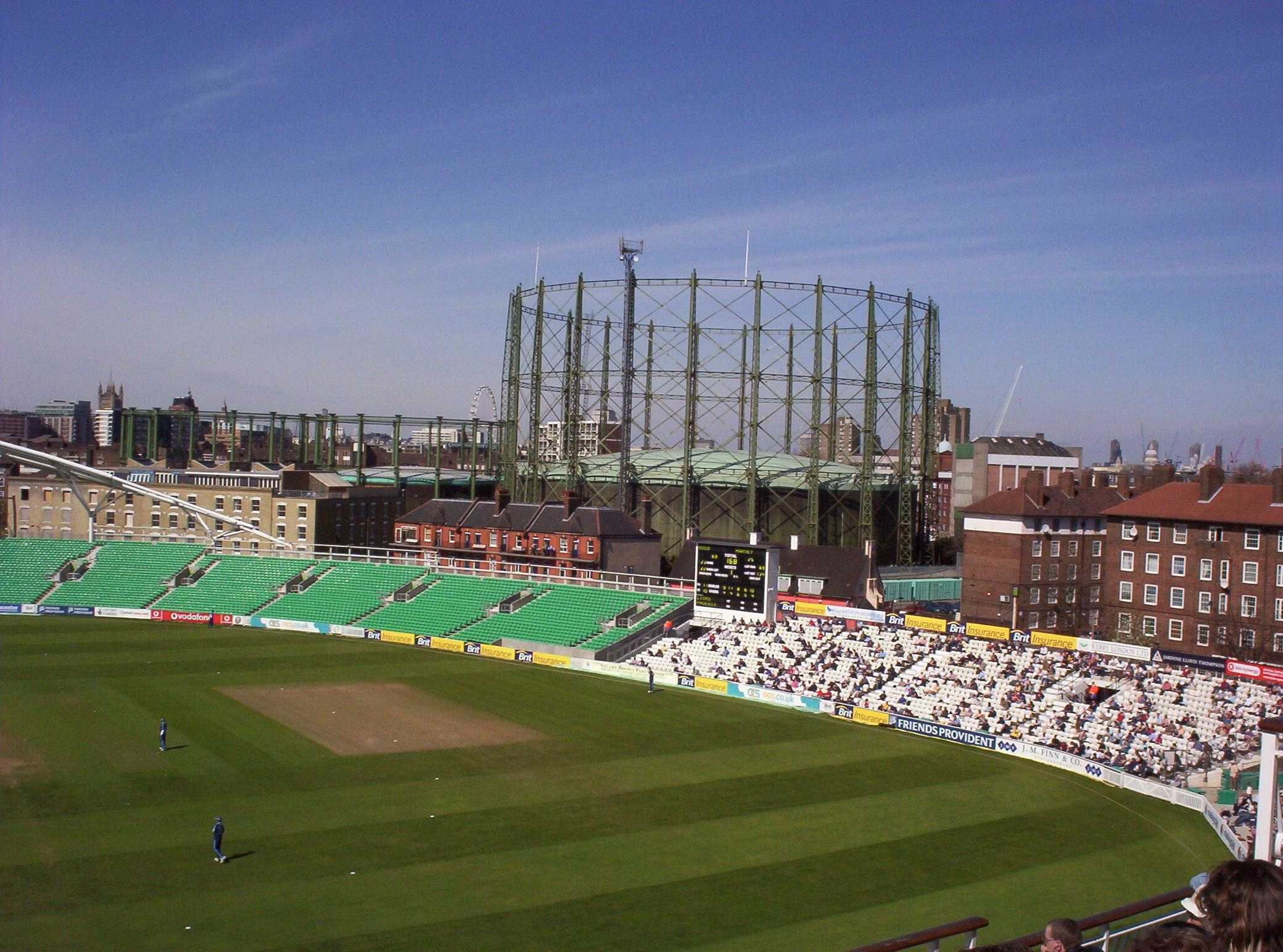
The Oval Gasholders in 2005

The Oval Gasholders is the unofficial name given to the gas holder (gasometer) located near The Oval cricket stadium in London, England. Construction began in 1853 and the site is officially called Kennington Holder Station by its owners, Southern Gas Network. It is a grade II listed building with the listed part of them known as Gasholder No. 1.

== History ==
The Phoenix Gas Light and Coke Company bought the site north of the Oval in 1845 from the Southwark & Vauxhall Waterworks Company, who had laid out the site in 1807 as a waterworks with an engine house and two circular brick-lined reservoirs. The Phoenix Gas Company adapted the circular reservoirs for gasholder tanks and erected five gasometers between 1847 and 1874.

The first iron gasholder was installed on the site in 1847 to service a gasworks next to Vauxhall Bridge. The Phoenix Gas Light and Coke Company replaced it in 1877–79 to designs by Sir Corbet Woodall, with two lifts holding 3 million cubic ft, making it the largest gasholder in the world. It was enlarged again by Frank Livesey in 1891–92 for the South Metropolitan Gas Company, by modifying the guides to increase their height by 50%, and adding two more lifts, including a "flying lift" rising above the guides, doubling its capacity to 6 million cubic feet. It is an early use of wrought iron in a frame. This structure, Gasholder 1, is Grade II listed by virtue of: a) its being the world's largest gasholder at the time, b) its famous designers Frank and George Livesey and c) its being an internationally renowned backdrop to matches at the adjacent Oval Cricket Ground. The cylindrical wrought iron guide frame is about 135 feet (41 m) high, with 24 t-section lattice standards, rising in three tiers and connected by three rows of horizontal lattice girders, with a rising "bell" of four tiers, including the top "flying lift" rising above the standards. It would have topped 180 feet (55 m) when full.

A second gasholder, No.2, was constructed in 1854–55 and converted to a spiral-guided holder in 1950, which does not require a frame. No.3 was constructed in 1869 but demolished c.1975.

The conjoined pair of Gasholders No. 4 & 5, erected in 1874 and 1876, was designed by Sir Corbet Woodall and is locally listed. Each of these gasholders has an elegant neo-classical style frame and Tuscan columns. The gasometers were decommissioned in 2014 and the site is due for redevelopment. There are concerns that only the nationally listed No.1 gasometer will be preserved.

== Cricket ground ==
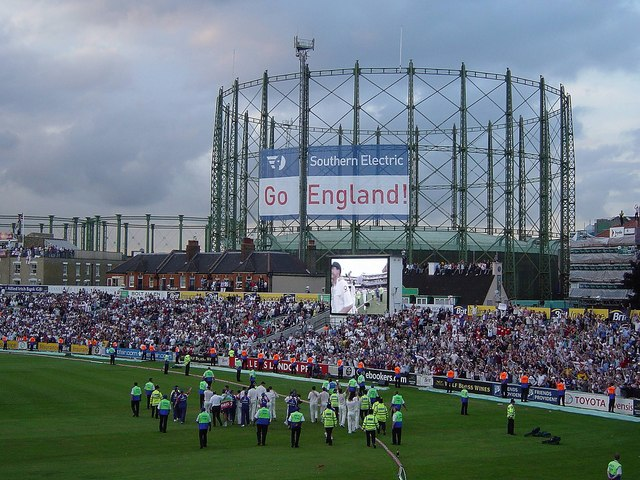
The gasholders after the end of the final day of the 2005 Ashes series, carrying a "Go England!" banner

The gasholders are adjacent to the north-east boundary wall of The Oval, and overlook the Vauxhall End of the ground. They have been long considered an intrinsic part of the traditional background of The Oval with the largest gas holder only ten years younger than the cricket ground, which was established in 1846. During England cricket team matches, huge advertising banners hang from the gas holders. They are regularly referred to in Test Match Special broadcasts.

In 2008 Surrey County Cricket Club, tenants of The Oval, announced plans to redevelop the ground along the side nearest the gas holders. However, their redevelopment plans were objected to by the Health and Safety Executive because of the proximity to the gas holders and amid fears that they might explode despite not cracking or leaking since construction. This view was supported by London Fire Brigade, who listed the gas holders as a hazardous site. The objection of the Health and Safety Executive was rejected by the Secretary of State and planning inspector.

== Recognition and listing ==
In 1999, plans were announced to dismantle all of the United Kingdom's gasholders due to being made largely redundant due to improvements in gas storage. This was intended to include the Oval Gas Holders. In March 2012 Lambeth Council locally listed the three gas holders of 1874, 1876 and 1892 (No.4, No.5 and No.1). In 2015, Lawrence D'Silva, a 26 year old local resident, presented a case to Historic England to make the gasholders listed buildings. Subsequently, Historic England assessed them all for national listing and in March 2016 decided to grant Grade II listed status to just one of the Oval Gasholders – No.1 (the largest of them) dating from 1892. The national listing designation supersedes the local listing status of this gasometer so Gasholder No. 1 was subsequently removed from the Local list by Lambeth – Nos. 4 & 5 remain locally listed. There is a strong presumption in the planning decision-making process against the demolition of a nationally listed heritage asset.

== Development ==
The redevelopment of the previously inaccessible brownfield site by Berkeley Homes as part of their Oval Village development continues Lambeth Council’s ambitions for the regeneration of Vauxhall, Nine Elms, Battersea.

The overall development of 8 blocks (heights from 4-19 storeys) includes 1300 homes, supermarket, community spaces, 14,600sqm of business space and a waste management facility. Substantial landscaping together with the restoration of the Grade II listed Gasholder No. 1 completes project.

Gasholder No. 1 itself is being converted 200 homes, many with views into the Oval cricket ground. A communal roof terrace provides all the residents with a view of the ground.
