= Kelly Hunter =

English actress

Kelly Hunter MBE
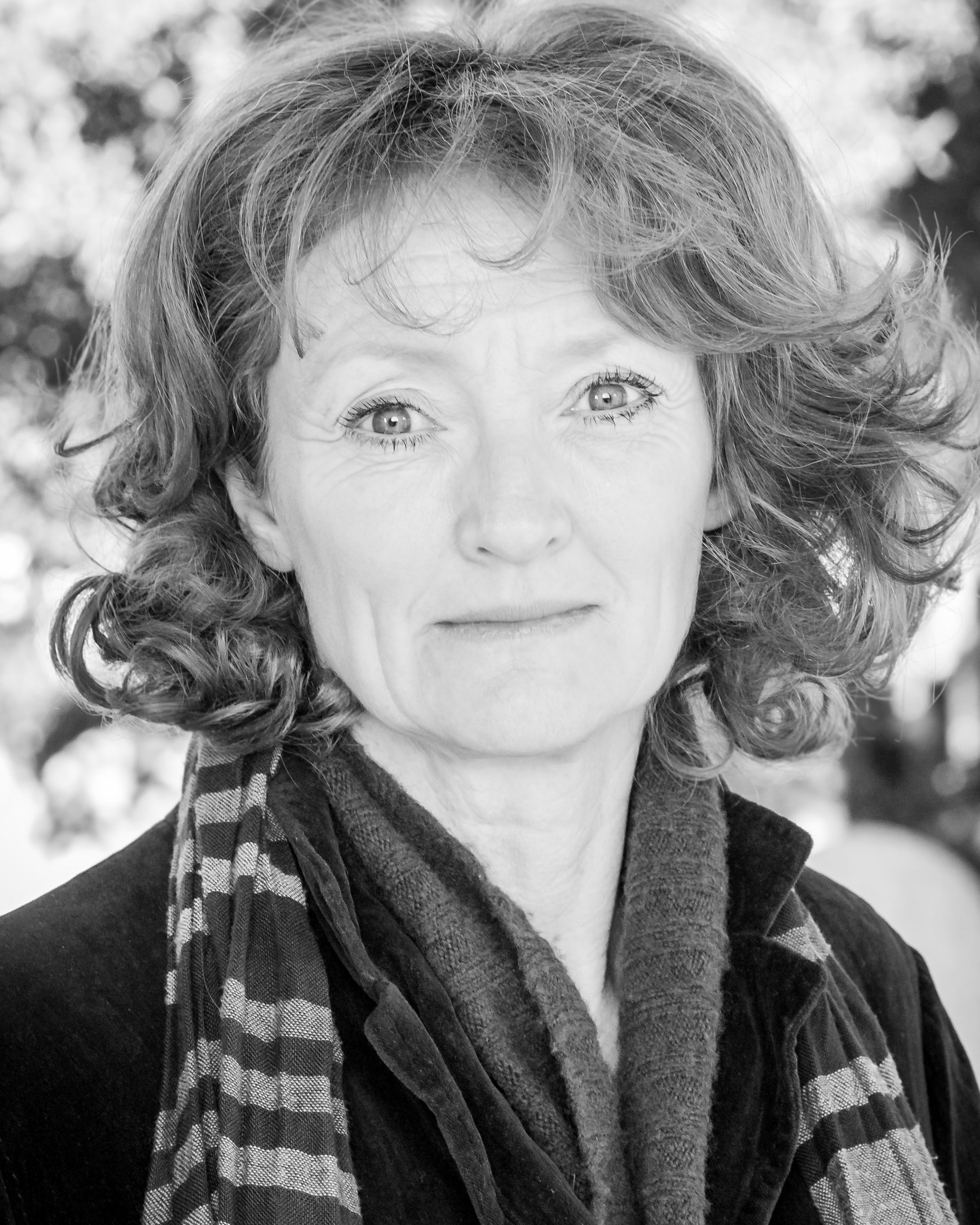
- Born: Kelly Hunter; 21 July 1963 (age 63); Battersea, London, England
- Occupation: Actress
- Years active: 1980–present

Kelly Hunter MBE (born 21 July 1963) is a British film, television, radio, stage and musical actress, a member of the Royal Shakespeare Company and the National Theatre. She is a Laurence Olivier Award nominee and Radio Academy Award and TMA Awards winner.

The daughter of the actors Maria Charles and Robin Hunter, Kelly Hunter grew up in London and attended the Lady Margaret School in Parsons Green, followed by the Arts Educational Schools in London, which she left when she was 16. Her sister is the stage manager Samantha Hunter. She was married to the theatre director Simon Usher with whom she has two sons, Albert Usher (born 1996) and Charlie Usher (born 1998). She is the Founder and Artistic Director of Flute Theatre, a company which produces the works of William Shakespeare for interactive audiences. She lives in South West London.

== Theatre career ==
Born in 1963 in Battersea in London, Hunter's professional acting career began with playing The Mistress in the original West End production of Evita (1980). Over the next decade she appeared in leading roles in musicals for Hal Prince, Sir Peter Hall, Jerome Savary and Trevor Nunn; for the latter she appeared as Lola in The Blue Angel (1991–92) with the Royal Shakespeare Company at the Royal Shakespeare Theatre in Stratford-upon-Avon and in the West End and for which she was nominated for a Laurence Olivier Award in the category 'Best Actress in a Musical' (1993). Stage appearances at the National Theatre include roles in Jean Seberg (1983) directed by Sir Peter Hall, She Stoops to Conquer (1984) directed by Giles Block, and A Chorus of Disapproval (1985) directed by Alan Ayckbourn. At the Strand Theatre she played Sally Bowles in Cabaret (1986) with Peter Land as Cliff and Wayne Sleep as the Emcee, directed and choreographed by Gillian Lynne, while at the Royal Exchange she appeared in School for Scandal (1990) directed by Phyllida Lloyd.

Hunter as Sally Bowles in the London revival of Cabaret (1986)

She worked with Stephen Unwin at the English Touring Theatre, appearing as Nora Helmer in A Doll's House (1994) and as Rosalind in As You Like It (1995), receiving a Theatre Awards UK for the latter role. She played Dorothy Wordsworth in the one-woman play Exquisite Sister (1996), which she co-wrote with Simon Usher and which was performed at West Yorkshire Playhouse in Leeds and the Assembly Rooms during the Edinburgh Festival. In 2000 Hunter appeared in Sir Peter Hall's production of Giuseppe Manfridi's play Cuckoos at the Gate Theatre in London, and appeared in The Lucky Ones at Hampstead Theatre (2002).

For the RSC Hunter appeared as Isobel in Stephen Poliakoff's Talk of the City (1998), Lady Constance in King John (2000), and Eva Maria Garrick in Jubilee (2001). She played Goneril in King Lear and Hermione in The Winter's Tale in David Farr's productions at Stratford, London and New York (2010).

Since 2006 she has made occasional international tours as The Mother in the Icelandic theatre group Vesturport's popular production of Metamorphosis, having originated the role at the Lyric Theatre in Hammersmith.

In September 2013 she played Mrs Alving in Ghosts at the Rose Theatre, Kingston, under the direction of Stephen Unwin.

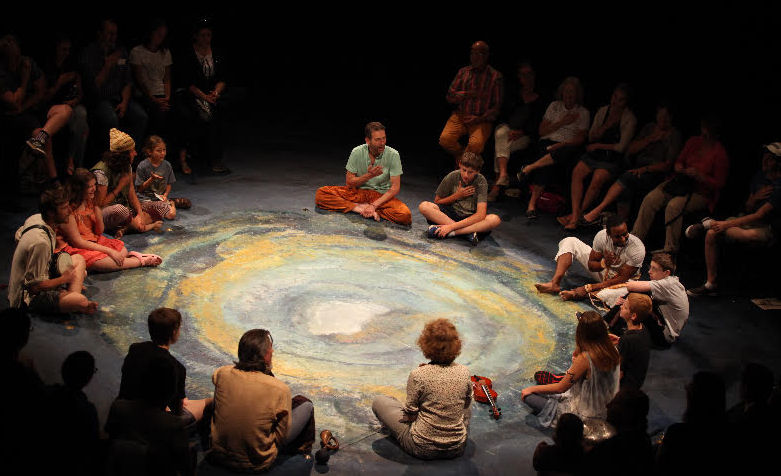
Flute Theatre performing The Tempest for children with autism (2016)

Hunter is the founder and Artistic Director of Flute Theatre, a touring company which performs the works of Shakespeare for interactive audiences. Her production of Hamlet, who's there?, in which she played Gertrude, had an international tour throughout 2016. Flute's other productions which have also toured the international Shakespeare festivals include The Tempest and Twelfth Night.

In June 2019 Hunter was appointed Member of the British Empire (MBE) in the Queen's Birthday Honours for services to theatre.

== Radio, TV and film roles ==
=== Television ===
For television Hunter's roles include:

- Marilyn in Agony (1981).
- Helen in Boon (1989).
- Sylvia in Bergerac (1989).
- Daphne Haycock in The House of Elliot (1991).
- Mrs. Gascoigne in Bottom (1992).
- Jessica Smithy in Prime Suspect 3 (1993).
- Lucy Chapman in Resort to Murder (1995).
- Ronnie Crew in Silent Witness (1996).
- Jackie Reece in Soldier Soldier (1996).
- Eve in the animated series Testament: The Bible in Animation (1996).
- Maddy Hammond in Close Relations (1998).
- Amy Webber in Life Force (2000).
- Nina Partington in Holby City (2000).
- Prison Psychiatrist in The Vice (2001).
- Poppy in Perfect Strangers (2001).
- Lady Rochford in Henry VIII (2003).
- Kate Malpas in Midsomer Murders (2003).
- Judith Lynley in The Inspector Lynley Mysteries (2005).
- Jo Hobson/Lillian Salcedo/Gina Gifford in The Bill (1999–2005).
- Mrs Lane in Life Begins (2005).
- Miss Barbary in Bleak House (2005).
- Laura MacAlpine in Dalziel and Pascoe episode "Guardian Angel" (2006).
- Mrs Douglas in Trial & Retribution (2007).
- Chrissie Hendricks/Helen in Casualty (1996 and 2007).
- Marie Waters in Waking the Dead (2008).
- Shadow Architect in the Doctor Who episodes "The Stolen Earth" (2008) and "The Magician's Apprentice" (2015).
- Hermione and Goneril in Shakespeare: The King's Man (2012).

=== Film ===
Her film appearances include:

- Argonian citizen in Supergirl (1984).
- Deidre in Being Human (1994).
- Maureen in Look Me in the Eye (1994).
- Jamie's Mother in Hollow Reed (1996).
- Mme Victurien in Les Misérables (1998).
- Luzhin's mother in The Luzhin Defence (2000).
- DI Chapman in The Hole (2001).
- The Marchioness of Steyne in Vanity Fair (2004).
- Ursula Walsingham in Elizabeth: The Golden Age (2007).

=== Radio ===
Radio includes

- The Parasites and Soeur Sourire (2003).
- BBC Radio 4 as Hannah Armstrong in Number 10 (2007).

== The Hunter Heartbeat Method ==
Hunter first began working with children with autism during her time with the RSC in 2002, when she set up her own company, Touchstone Shakespeare Theatre, to work with children, some with autism, who had little if any access to the Arts. Through this work she created and developed The Hunter Heartbeat Method, a distinctive methodology which uses Shakespeare's rhythmic language and physical gesture to release communicative blocks within children with all levels of autism, including children who are non-verbal. The methodology is being studied as a long-term research project at Ohio State University.

A DVD Dreams and Voices (2007), documents the early games of the methodology and is available from the National Autistic Society.

In June 2014 Hunter directed a production of The Tempest for children with autism at the Royal Shakespeare Theatre in Stratford-upon-Avon after which it toured to Ohio State University.

== Honours, awards and nominations ==
Hunter was appointed Member of the Order of the British Empire (MBE) in the 2019 Birthday Honours for services to theatre.

=== Laurence Olivier Awards ===
0 win, 1 nomination

Laurence Olivier Award
Year	Nominated work	Category	Result
1993	The Blue Angel playing "Lola" at the Globe Theatre	1993 Laurence Olivier Awards Best Actress in a Musical	Nominated

=== Radio Academy Awards ===
1 win, 1 nomination

Radio Academy Awards
Year	Nominated work	Category	Result
1997	Kelly Hunter for 'Transit of Venus, BBC Radio 3'	Sony Gold Award Winner for Best Dramatic Performance	Won

=== Theatre Awards UK ===
1 win, 1 nomination

Theatre Awards UK
Year	Nominated work	Category	Result
1996	Rosalind for 'As you like it, English Touring Theatre'	Best Actress Award	Won
