= Gillian Wearing =

English artist (born 1963)

Gillian Wearing CBE, RA
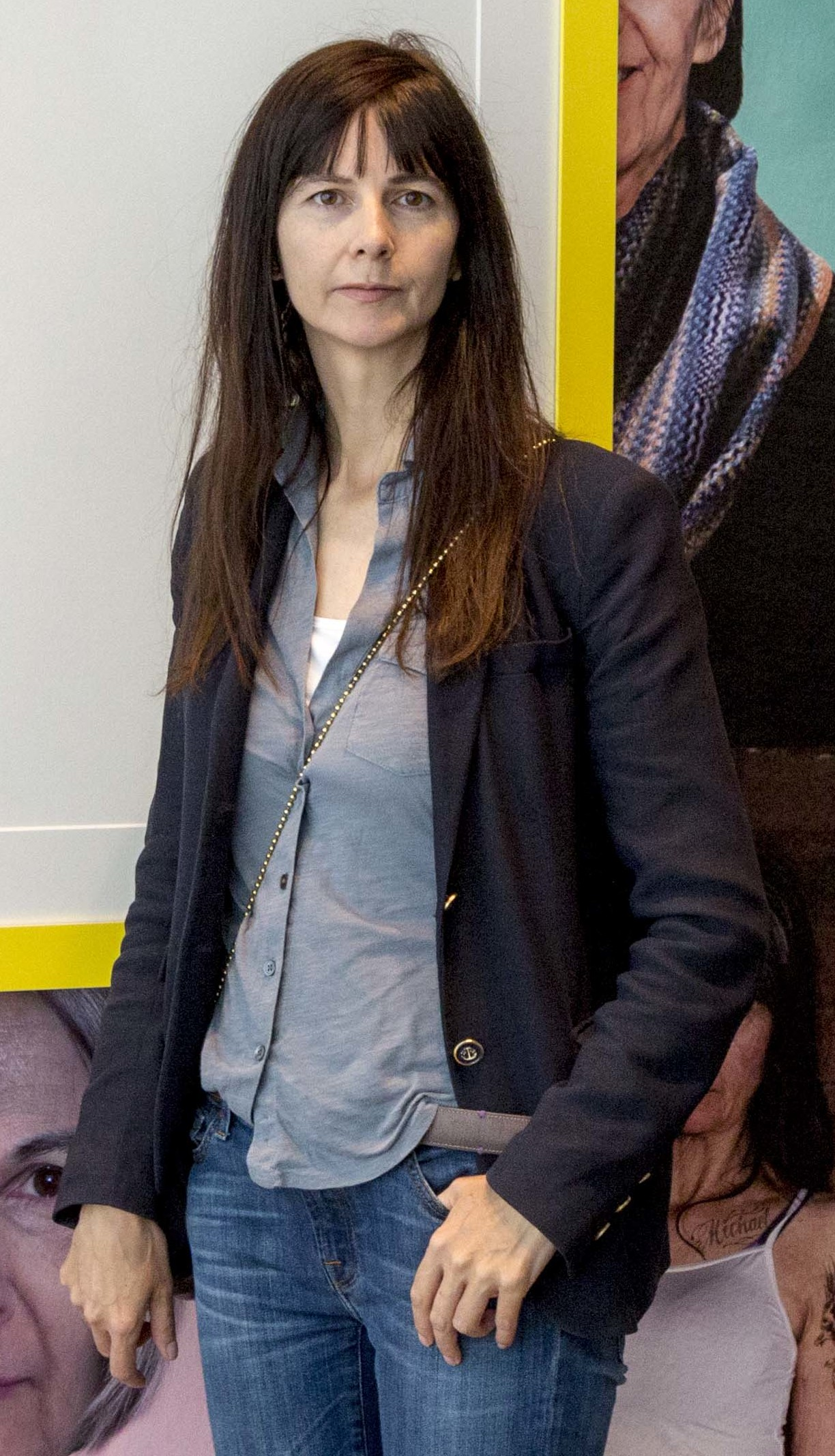
- Gillian Wearing, in the IVAM, València, 2015.
- Born: 10 December 1963 (age 62); Birmingham, England
- Education: Goldsmiths
- Known for: Conceptual art, installation art
- Movement: Young British Artists
- Awards: Turner Prize

Gillian Wearing CBE, RA (born 10 December 1963) is an English conceptual artist, one of the Young British Artists, and winner of the 1997 Turner Prize. In 2007 Wearing was elected as lifetime member of the Royal Academy of Arts in London. Her statue of the suffragist Millicent Fawcett stands in London's Parliament Square.

From 5 November 2021 to 4 April 2022, the Solomon R. Guggenheim Museum in New York City showed Gillian Wearing: Wearing Masks, the first retrospective of Wearing's work in North America.

== Early life ==
Wearing was born in 1963 in Birmingham, England. She attended Dartmouth High School in Great Barr, Sandwell. She moved to Chelsea, London to study art at the Chelsea School of Art and squatted in Oval Mansions. In 1987 she attained a bachelor of technology degree in art and design and in 1990 she attained a BFA from Goldsmiths, University of London.

== Art practice ==
Wearing is known for her method of documentation of everyday life through photography and video, concerning individual identity within the private and the public spaces, where Wearing blurs the line between reality and fiction. John Slyce has described Wearing's method of representation as "frame[ing] herself as she frames the other". Her work in photography and video at first appear like most other journalistic methods of documentation seen in television and documentaries, but after further examination it becomes apparent that they do not conform to mass-media conventions. Wearing's work reveals that the camera does not take a neutral stance towards its object, but is rather a powerful mass-media organ that breaks down the divide between public and private. In the early 1990s, Wearing began putting together photography exhibitions where she worked with strangers. There is a recurring pattern in her work where she plays and mocks the idea of the artist as anthropologist, but her anthropological activities do not focus on discovering a foreign culture but instead challenges what we thought we already knew. Wearing sees that Anthropology "attempts to compress human subjectivity into scientific objectivity". As John Slyce puts it: "Gillian Wearing does not suffer the indignity of speaking for others.". How Wearing approaches her subjects then is by inviting the individual to include their own articulation of thought into the picture within the space that she has provided, rather than an objective documentation. In an interview with Donna De Salvo, Wearing states:

"For me, one of the biggest problems with pure documentary photography is how the photographer, like the artist, engineers something to look like a certain kind of social statement—for instance, you can make someone look miserable, when this is just one side, a nuance of their personality. They might just be looking away at something, but their expression could be read as showing a kind of depression in their overall behavior. I couldn't bear the idea of taking photographs of people without knowing".

=== Signs that say what you want them to say and not Signs that say what someone else wants you to say (1992–1993) ===
In her piece Signs that say what you want them to say and not Signs that say what someone else wants you to say (1992–1993), Wearing conducted a series of portraits wherein she approached strangers that she encountered on the street, and asked them to write what they were thinking about on a placard. Wearing stated that "When they returned with something they had written, it challenged [her] own perception of them". Through this exercise, people of different backgrounds, religions, ages and social statuses become unified through the art practise as "all of a sudden you have to start re-appraising people." The audience's fantasies of imposing their own interpretations onto these photographed subjects are challenged and redirected by the paper that they are holding. This exchange between Wearing and the subjects she photographed transformed the typically alienating portrait photography practise into an intimate conversational piece, linking photographer with subject, and audience with photographer.

=== Mask ===
In Russell Ferguson's "Show Your Emotions" he draws Wearing's use of mask draws to an older tradition that runs back to at least as far as classical Greek tragedy: "One in which the mask functions not so much to substitute one identity for another as to obliterate the superficial aspects of physical appearance in order to reveal more fundamental truths". In Confess all on video. Don't worry you will be in disguise. Intrigued? Call Gillian (1994) is a 30-minute long video where Wearing recruited strangers through posting an ad in Time out magazine and provided a space where participants would confess their terrors and fantasies to the camera, their identity protected by costume masks. The mask is a reoccurring device in Wearing's work and it functions as protection as well as an apparatus that empowers the wearer; by making their identities anonymous it allows them to express their identity without constraint. As the viewer, access to truth becomes dislocated. Wearing presents this fictitious nature of the work as a report. The use of masks also questions authenticity and how reality can be fabricated. as said by Doris Krystof:

"Protected by masks, protected by their anonymity and protect by the free realm of art where their confessions are recorded but not judged, where there are no consequences to fear, no ideology or attempted appropriation to deal with, the participants could enjoy a sense of liberation and trust in their own voices."

Trauma (2000) is a further exploration of confessing with a mask. The eight participants confess their trauma and the mask that is given reflects the age when they suffered their trauma, with the intention of transporting the viewer back to "the defining moment in the wearer's lives". What's intriguing about this piece is that it seems like that it's not the first time that the participants have told their story because of how well rehearsed it looks. But that's not the case, it might be that they have been reciting the trauma that they have experienced in their heads over many years.

In Homage to the woman with the bandaged face who I saw yesterday down Walworth Road (1995), Wearing covers her head with white bandages and walks around in public. This piece materialized after Wearing caught a glimpse of a woman she saw with a bandaged head while in her friend's car. Wearing initially wanted to ask for permission to film the woman, although she decided to cover her own face with bandages and reenact what she had seen instead. Her walk was documented discreetly from behind and there was a hidden camera installed inside of the mask, capturing onlookers' horrid reactions. Krystof Doris contextualizes Wearing's approach: "The relationship between observer and observed is first established, then reversed, but always recounted from the perspective of the artist." In 2003-2006, Gillian Wearing recreated photographs of her relatives that were found in her family album. She created masks out of silicone of her mother, her father, her sister, her uncle, and a mask of herself with help from experts that were trained at Madam Tussauds in London. They start creating the mask in clay from a two-dimensional image into a three-dimensional object. In an article for The Guardian she explains that the process takes four months per mask, and how at first "some people tried to direct me to use prosthetics, but I was adamant it had to be a mask, something that transforms me entirely, something that was not grotesque but real, like a trompe l'oeil". These expensive silicone masks deteriorate easily after use, turning the photo shoot into a performative act where the action is unrepeatable. This process becomes paradoxical because of the difficulties that are encountered while recreating these casual snapshots. This work references into the canonical work in the history of photography of Cindy Sherman, though Wearing has shifted the focus to exploring her own persona and its underlying relationships as a social construct. The works in Album then do not necessarily put the family members as the main focus; rather they capture Wearing's engagement with the family members.

=== Turner Prize ===
"60 Minutes Silence (1996)" is the piece that won Wearing the Turner Prize in 1997. Wearing used a fixed camera and the length of the pose was long in duration, which resulted in an awkward personal moment. At first the image appears like a backlit group portrait of British police officers but after further examination the slight movements that they make reveals that it is in fact a video. In Krystof Doris' text "Masks, Identity, and Performativity" he explains that the power relation between the viewer and the viewed (the police officers) are reversed due to the disciplining scenario that Wearing placed upon the group of police officers. The individuality of each member begins to assert itself as the recording goes on and the officers conclusively become "ordinary human beings".

=== 1990s ===
In the early 1990s, Wearing started putting together photography exhibitions that were based around the idea of photographing anonymous strangers in the street who she had asked to hold up a piece of paper with a message on it. The series was named Signs That Say What You Want Them To Say and Not Signs That Say What Someone. Of these "confessional" pieces, Wearing stated,

I decided that I wanted people to feel protected when they talked about certain things in their life that they wouldn't want the public that knows them to know. I can understand that sort of holding on to things—it's kind of part of British society to hold things in. I always think of Britain as being a place where you're meant to keep your secrets—you should never tell your neighbors or tell anyone. Things are changing now, because the culture's changed and the Internet has brought people out. We have Facebook and Twitter where people tell you small details of their life.

In 1994, Wearing created the provocative film "Dancing in Peckham", where she recorded herself dancing in a busy South London shopping centre capturing the reactions of passers-by to explore the gap between public and private experience.

One of Wearing's first UK shows was held at the Chisenhale Gallery in east London, in June 1997. In 1997, Wearing won the Turner Prize and exhibited videos such as 60 minutes silence which is a video of 26 uniformed police officers, but at first appears to be a photograph. Wearing said, "The piece is about authority, restraint, and control." She also exhibited Sacha and Mum showing emotions between a mother and daughter. Wearing described the piece as, "Things can not be finalized—- as far as emotions are concerned. They're always in turmoil and can go to two polar opposites." Cornelia Parker, Christine Borland and Angela Bulloch were the other shortlisted artists.

In the late 1990s, Wearing made a three-channel video called Drunk (1997-1999), for which she filmed a group of street drinkers who she had got to know outside her studio against the backdrop of a white photographic backdrop. The drinkers are shown in different scenes individually and in groups. They stagger around, fall over, bicker, fight, sleep and in the end one of the men stands against the backdrop and urinates.

=== 2000s ===
In Wearing's Broad Street (2001), she documents the behavior of typical teenagers in British society who go out at night and drink large amounts of alcohol. Wearing shows teenagers partying at various clubs and bars along Broad Street, Birmingham. Wearing follows these teenagers demonstrating how alcohol contributes to their loss of inhibitions, insecurities, and control.

In 2003, Wearing caused controversy with her cover for The Guardian's G2 supplement, consisting solely of the handwritten words "Fuck Cilla Black". The cover illustrated an article by Stuart Jeffries complaining about the cruelty of modern television.

The themes of modern television were further explored in Wearing's project Family History (2006) commissioned by Film and Video Umbrella, and accompanied by a publication on the project.

=== 2010s ===
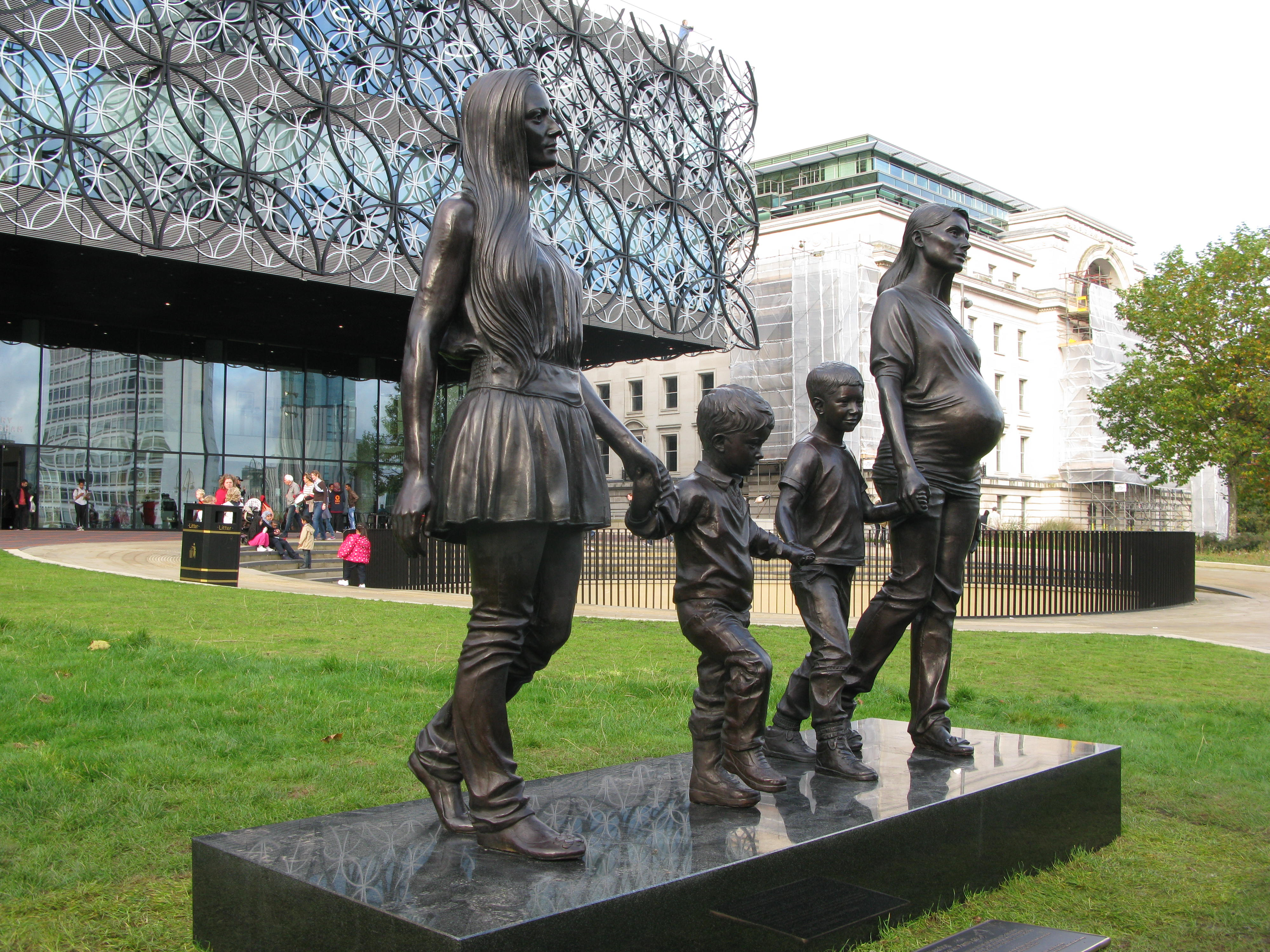
A Real Birmingham Family

Wearing's 2010 show People (2005–2011) at Tanya Bonakdar Gallery included work ranging from video, to photographic portraiture, to installation and sculpture. Snapshot (2005) is a series of seven single-projection videos framed by a candy-colored array of plasma screens, each depicting different stages of the female life cycle—from the innocence of early childhood to old age.

Wearing also released her first feature film in this year: Self Made. Film theorist David Deamer writes that the film 'is a paradox. And it is the nature of the paradox that gives the film its power [...] The paradox emerges indirectly, a consequence of the two modes of narration of the film. First mode: documentary. The participants – through their facilitator, Sam Rumbelow – explore the techniques of "the method", method acting, which will allow them to encounter themselves anew and so generate their own "self-made" film. In this way each participant goes on to star in their own short, which, while encompassed by director Gillian Wearing's documentary, appears as its own moment of narration. So, second mode: fiction'.

Wearing was appointed Officer of the Order of the British Empire (OBE) in the 2011 Birthday Honours for services to art. In the same year, she was among the names in Blake Gopnik's list "The 10 Most Important Artists of Today".

In 2012, a major retrospective of her work was held at Whitechapel Gallery, London (March–June 2012), which surveyed her career and premiered new films and sculptures. The exhibition was organised with Kunstsammlung Nordrhein-Westfalen, Düsseldorf and supported by Maja Hoffmann, Vicky Hughes and John Smith, and Dr Naomi Milgrom AO. An accompanying monograph was published by Ridinghouse and included texts by curator Daniel Herrmann, Doris Krystof, Bernhart Schwenk and David Deamer.

In 2013, Wearing showed her exhibit People: Selected Parkett Artists' Editions from 1984 to 2013 Parkett Space, Zurich, Switzerland (9 February-11 March 2013).

On 30 October 2014 her sculpture A Real Birmingham Family was unveiled in front of the Library of Birmingham.

On 24 April 2018, her statue of the suffragist Millicent Fawcett was unveiled in London's Parliament Square; it is the first statue of a woman in Parliament Square. This makes Wearing the first woman to create a statue that is in Parliament Square.

=== 2020s ===
From November 5, 2021 to April 4, 2022, the Solomon R. Guggenheim Museum in New York City was showing Gillian Wearing: Wearing Masks, the first retrospective of Wearing's work in North America.

== Personal life ==
Wearing lives and works in London with her partner, British artist Michael Landy.

== Awards ==
- 1997: Turner Prize for 60 Minutes Silence (1996)
- 2007: Lifetime membership of the Royal Academy of Arts, London
- 2016: Honorary Doctorate from Birmingham City University
