= 2023 Runnymede Borough Council election =

2023 English Local election

| ← 2022 | 4 May 2023 | 2024 → |

14 of the 41 seats in the Runnymede Borough Council 21 seats needed for a majority
- Registered: 59,845
- Turnout: 19,547 (32.7%)
| | First party | Second party | Third party |
|---|---|---|---|
| Leader | Tom Gracey | Robert King | Don Whyte |
| Party | Conservative | Labour Co-op | Liberal Democrats |
| Leader since | 2022 | 2021 | 2019 |
| Leader's seat | Woodham & Rowtown | Egham Hythe | Longcross, Lyne and Chertsey South |
| Last election | 6 | 2 | 1 |
| Seats before | 24 | 3 | 3 |
| Seats won | 5 | 2 | 2 |
| Seats after | 20 | 4 | 4 |
| Seat change | ▼4 | ▲1 | ▲1 |
| Popular vote | 7,211 | 4,236 | 3,751 |
| Percentage | 36.9% | 21.7% | 19.2% |
| Swing | ▼1.0 pp | ▲4.4 pp | ▲0.6 pp |
| | Fourth party | Fifth party | Sixth party |
| Leader | Isabel Mullens | Steve Ringham | Malcolm Cressey |
| Party | RIRG | Green | Independent |
| Leader since | 2022 | 2022 | 2019 |
| Leader's seat | Egham Town | Addlestone North | Ottershaw |
| Last election | 2 | 1 | 1 |
| Seats before | 6 | 1 | 4 |
| Seats won | 2 | 1 | 2 |
| Seats after | 6 | 2 | 5 |
| Seat change | 0 | ▲1 | ▲1 |
| Popular vote | 1,667 | 1,278 | 1,237 |
| Percentage | 8.5% | 6.5% | 6.3% |
| Swing | 0.0 pp | ▲0.1 pp | ▼4.8 pp |
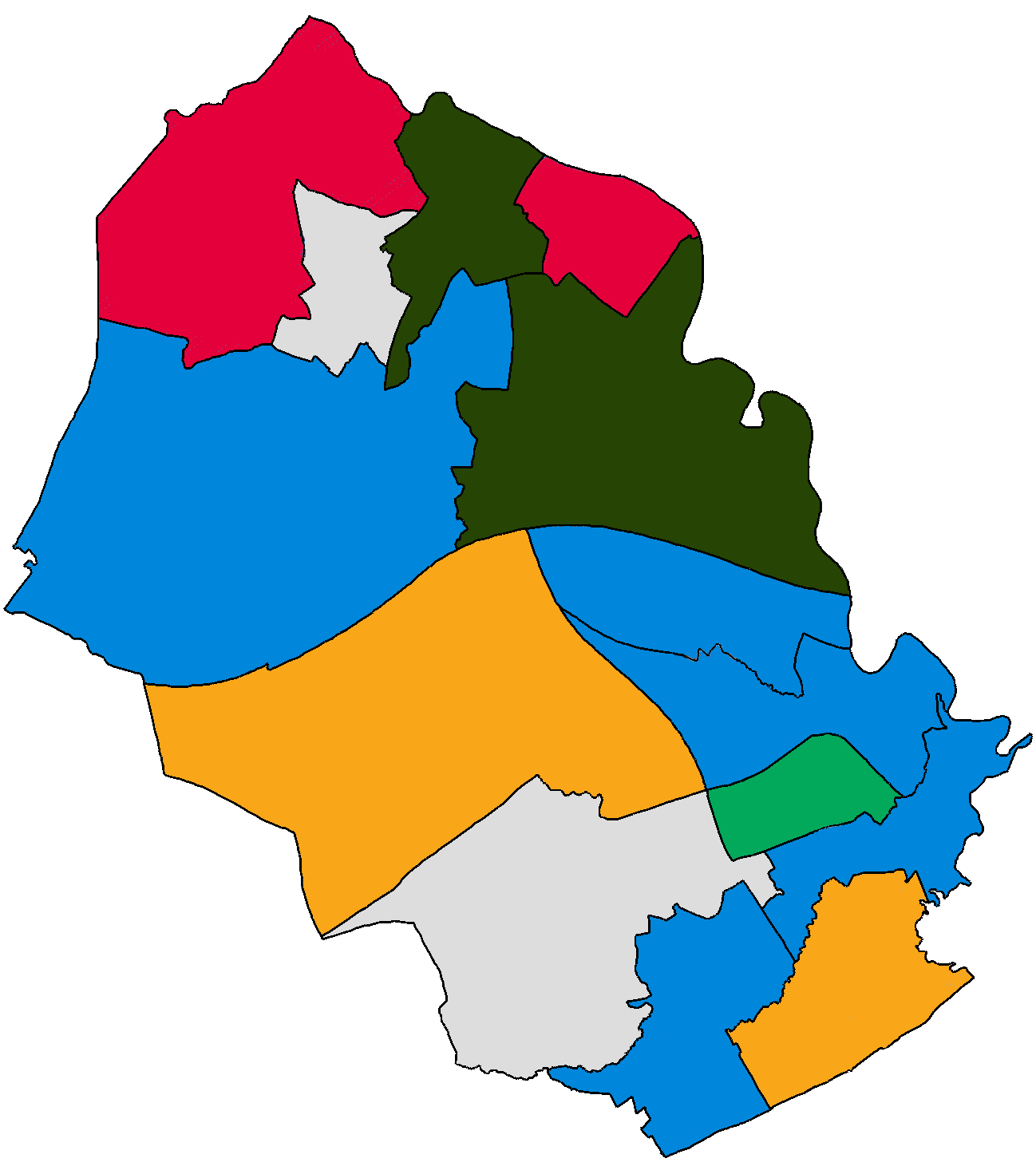
- A map presenting the results of the election, by party of the councillor elected from each ward
Leader before election
Tom Gracey
Conservative
Leader after election
Tom Gracey
Conservative
No overall control

The 2023 Runnymede Borough Council election took place on 4 May 2023 to elect one-third of members of the Runnymede Borough Council in Surrey, England. This was on the same day as other local elections in England.

The Conservative Party lost control of the council for the second time since the first election in 1973, the first being a short period between 1996 and 1998 when it was also under no overall control. In the previous election in 2022, the Conservative Party retained control of the council, winning 6 out of 14 seats and holding their majority, albeit reduced to 7. Liberal Democrat, Labour Co-op Party and Green Party each made gains of one seat each, and one independent gained a seat also.

The Conservatives managed to form a minority administration after the election with informal support from the three independent councillors representing the Ottershaw ward.

These were the first elections to be held with a new requirement for voters to have photo ID to vote in person at a polling station.

== Overall results ==
Runnymede Borough Council election 2023
| Party | This election | | | Full council | | | This election | | |
| Party | Seats | Net | Seats % | Other | Total | Total % | Votes | Votes % | +/− |
|---|---|---|---|---|---|---|---|---|---|
| Conservative | 5 | ▼4 | 35.7 | 15 | 20 | 48.8 | 7,211 | 36.9 | -1.0 |
| Labour Co-op | 2 | ▲1 | 14.3 | 2 | 4 | 9.8 | 4,236 | 21.7 | +4.4 |
| Liberal Democrats | 2 | ▲1 | 14.3 | 2 | 4 | 9.8 | 3,751 | 19.2 | +0.6 |
| RIRG | 2 | 0 | 14.3 | 4 | 6 | 14.6 | 1,667 | 8.5 | =0.0 |
| Independent | 2 | ▲1 | 14.3 | 3 | 5 | 12.2 | 1,237 | 6.3 | -4.8 |
| Green | 1 | ▲1 | 7.1 | 1 | 2 | 4.9 | 1,278 | 6.5 | +0.1 |
| Liberal | 0 | New | 0.0 | 0 | 0 | 0.0 | 81 | 0.4 | New |
| Reform | 0 | New | 0.0 | 0 | 0 | 0.0 | 71 | 0.4 | New |
| Heritage | 0 | 0 | 0.0 | 0 | 0 | 0.0 | 15 | 0.1 | -0.2 |

== Ward results ==
The results for each ward were as follows:

=== Addlestone North ===
Addlestone North
| Party | Candidate | Votes | % | ±% |
|---|---|---|---|---|
| Green | Manu Singh | 545 | 39.7 | −0.9 |
| Conservative | David Curran | 515 | 37.5 | +0.3 |
| Labour Co-op | June Tilbury | 228 | 16.6 | +2.2 |
| Liberal Democrats | Rudi Dikty-Daudiyan | 86 | 6.3 | −1.6 |
| Majority | | 30 | 2.2 | |
| Rejected ballots | | 7 | | |
| Turnout | | 1374 | 31.5 | |
| Green gain from Conservative | | Swing | -0.6 | |

=== Addlestone South ===
Addlestone South
| Party | Candidate | Votes | % | ±% |
|---|---|---|---|---|
| Conservative | Peter Snow | 609 | 41.7 | −2.6 |
| Labour Co-op | Elaine Percival | 529 | 36.3 | +11.7 |
| Liberal Democrats | Ray Williamson | 178 | 12.2 | −6.0 |
| Green | Brian Gardiner | 143 | 9.8 | −3.0 |
| Majority | | 80 | 5.5 | |
| Rejected ballots | | 14 | | |
| Turnout | | 1459 | 30.3 | |
| Conservative hold | | Swing | -7.1 | |

=== Chertsey Riverside ===
Chertsey Riverside
| Party | Candidate | Votes | % | ±% |
|---|---|---|---|---|
| Conservative | Jaz Mavi | 565 | 41.9 | +2.7 |
| Labour Co-op | Cai Parry | 519 | 38.5 | +11.0 |
| Liberal Democrats | Annabel Jones | 158 | 11.7 | −10.4 |
| Green | Elaine Brindley | 107 | 7.9 | −3.6 |
| Majority | | 46 | 3.4 | |
| Rejected ballots | | 5 | | |
| Turnout | | 1349 | 29.3 | |
| Conservative hold | | Swing | -4.1 | |

=== Chertsey St. Ann's ===
Chertsey St. Ann's
| Party | Candidate | Votes | % | ±% |
|---|---|---|---|---|
| Conservative | Mark Nuti | 647 | 45.1 | +10.8 |
| Labour Co-op | Ricky Milstead | 524 | 36.5 | +16.5 |
| Liberal Democrats | Kevin Lee | 167 | 11.6 | −1.5 |
| Green | Tim Hayes | 96 | 6.7 | New |
| Majority | | 123 | 8.6 | |
| Rejected ballots | | 10 | | |
| Turnout | | 1434 | 30.1 | |
| Conservative hold | | Swing | -2.9 | |

=== Egham Hythe ===
Egham Hythe
| Party | Candidate | Votes | % | ±% |
|---|---|---|---|---|
| Labour Co-op | Robert King | 749 | 49.8 | −8.0 |
| Conservative | Mark Adams | 624 | 41.5 | −0.8 |
| Liberal | Roberto Buono | 81 | 5.4 | New |
| Independent | John Olorenshaw | 49 | 3.3 | New |
| Majority | | 125 | 8.3 | |
| Rejected ballots | | 2 | | |
| Turnout | | 1503 | 30.8 | |
| Labour Co-op hold | | Swing | -3.6 | |

=== Egham Town ===
Egham Town
| Party | Candidate | Votes | % | ±% |
|---|---|---|---|---|
| RIRG | Isabel Mullens | 927 | 64.6 | +9.2 |
| Labour | Meera Saravanan | 213 | 14.9 | −0.1 |
| Conservative | John Osborn | 212 | 14.8 | −3.9 |
| Liberal Democrats | Ian Heath | 82 | 5.7 | +0.9 |
| Majority | | 714 | 49.8 | |
| Rejected ballots | | 7 | | |
| Turnout | | 1434 | 32.8 | |
| RIRG hold | | Swing | +4.7 | |

=== Englefield Green East ===
Englefield Green East
| Party | Candidate | Votes | % | ±% |
|---|---|---|---|---|
| Independent | Trevor Gates | 442 | 54.5 | +8.6 |
| Conservative | Lewis Virgo | 188 | 23.2 | −3.9 |
| Labour Co-op | Archie Langdon | 113 | 13.9 | −5.9 |
| Liberal Democrats | Tom Jordan | 68 | 8.4 | +1.2 |
| Majority | | 254 | 31.3 | |
| Rejected ballots | | 1 | | |
| Turnout | | 811 | 33.2 | |
| Independent gain from Conservative | | Swing | +6.3 | |

=== Englefield Green West ===
Englefield Green West
| Party | Candidate | Votes | % | ±% |
|---|---|---|---|---|
| Labour | Eliza Kettle | 613 | 53.9 | +17.1 |
| Conservative | Tanya Solomon | 525 | 46.1 | +11.1 |
| Majority | | 88 | 7.7 | |
| Rejected ballots | | 6 | | |
| Turnout | | 1138 | 30.0 | |
| Labour gain from Conservative | | Swing | +3.0 | |

=== Longcross, Lyne and Chertsey South ===
Longcross, Lyne and Chertsey South
| Party | Candidate | Votes | % | ±% |
|---|---|---|---|---|
| Liberal Democrats | Don Whyte | 689 | 73.2 | +4.4 |
| Conservative | Tommy Traylen | 252 | 26.8 | −4.4 |
| Majority | | 437 | 46.4 | |
| Rejected ballots | | 3 | | |
| Turnout | | 941 | 33.6 | |
| Liberal Democrats hold | | Swing | +4.4 | |

=== New Haw ===
New Haw
| Party | Candidate | Votes | % | ±% |
|---|---|---|---|---|
| Liberal Democrats | Mike Smith | 1,135 | 64.7 | +17.2 |
| Conservative | Jacqui Gracey | 536 | 30.6 | −17.5 |
| Green | Martin Robson | 68 | 3.9 | New |
| Heritage | Gian Palermiti | 15 | 0.9 | −3.5 |
| Majority | | 599 | 34.2 | |
| Rejected ballots | | 8 | | |
| Turnout | | 1754 | 37.0 | |
| Liberal Democrats gain from Conservative | | Swing | +17.4 | |

=== Ottershaw ===
Ottershaw
| Party | Candidate | Votes | % | ±% |
|---|---|---|---|---|
| Independent | Michael Cressey | 746 | 45.4 | −10.2 |
| Conservative | Peter Edwards | 431 | 26.2 | +1.1 |
| Labour Co-op | Joe Rourke | 215 | 13.1 | +1.9 |
| Liberal Democrats | Kevin DeCruz | 133 | 8.1 | −0.1 |
| Green | Peter Chiverton | 118 | 7.2 | New |
| Majority | | 315 | 19.2 | |
| Rejected ballots | | 6 | | |
| Turnout | | 1643 | 34.1 | |
| Independent hold | | Swing | -5.7 | |

=== Thorpe ===
Thorpe
| Party | Candidate | Votes | % | ±% |
|---|---|---|---|---|
| RIRG | Elaine Gill | 740 | 53.5 | +0.4 |
| Conservative | Jacqueline Sharp | 395 | 28.6 | +0.6 |
| Labour Co-op | Benjamin Niblett | 178 | 12.9 | −1.1 |
| Liberal Democrats | Cheryl Smith-Wright | 70 | 5.1 | +0.2 |
| Majority | | 345 | 24.9 | |
| Rejected ballots | | 7 | | |
| Turnout | | 1383 | 32.1 | |
| RIRG hold | | Swing | -0.1 | |

=== Virginia Water ===
Virginia Water
| Party | Candidate | Votes | % | ±% |
|---|---|---|---|---|
| Conservative | Chris Howorth | 789 | 47.5 | −9.2 |
| Liberal Democrats | Karin Roswell | 646 | 38.9 | +2.9 |
| Labour Co-op | Karen McKinlay-Gunn | 107 | 6.4 | −0.9 |
| Reform | Mayuran Senthilnathan | 71 | 4.3 | New |
| Green | Maciej Pawlik | 48 | 2.9 | New |
| Majority | | 143 | 8.6 | |
| Rejected ballots | | 4 | | |
| Turnout | | 1661 | 38.7 | |
| Conservative hold | | Swing | -6.0 | |

=== Woodham and Rowtown ===
Woodham and Rowtown
| Party | Candidate | Votes | % | ±% |
|---|---|---|---|---|
| Conservative | Tom Gracey | 923 | 55.5 | +0.4 |
| Liberal Democrats | Jennifer Coulon | 339 | 20.4 | −8.3 |
| Labour Co-op | Michael Scott | 248 | 14.9 | New |
| Green | Vicky Flyn | 153 | 9.2 | −7.0 |
| Majority | | 584 | 35.1 | |
| Rejected ballots | | 7 | | |
| Turnout | | 1663 | 34.4 | |
| Conservative hold | | Swing | +4.4 | |
