= 2022 Runnymede Borough Council election =

2022 UK local government election

| ← 2021 | 5 May 2022 | 2023 → |

14 of the 41 seats in the Runnymede Borough Council 21 seats needed for a majority
| | First party | Second party | Third party |
|---|---|---|---|
| Leader | Nick Prescot | Isabel Mullens | Robert King |
| Party | Conservative | RIRG | Labour Co-op |
| Leader since | 2017 | 2022 | 2021 |
| Leader's seat | Englefield Green West | Egham Town | Egham Hythe |
| Last election | 9 | 2 | 0 |
| Seats before | 26 | 6 | 1 |
| Seats won | 6 | 2 | 2 |
| Seats after | 24 | 6 | 3 |
| Seat change | ▼4 | Steady | ▲2 |
| Popular vote | 7,198 | 1,624 | 3,280 |
| Percentage | 37.9% | 8.5% | 17.3% |
| Swing | ▼6.6 pp | ▼0.6 pp | ▲0.6 pp |
| | Fourth party | Fifth party |
| Leader | Don Whyte | Steve Ringham |
| Party | Liberal Democrats | Green |
| Leader since | 2019 | new 2022 |
| Leader's seat | Longcross, Lyne and Chertsey South | Addlestone North |
| Last election | 1 | 0 |
| Seats before | 3 | 0 |
| Seats won | 1 | 1 |
| Seats after | 3 | 1 |
| Seat change | Steady | ▲1 |
| Popular vote | 3,524 | 1,208 |
| Percentage | 18.6% | 6.4% |
| Swing | ▲4.8 pp | ▲2.8 pp |
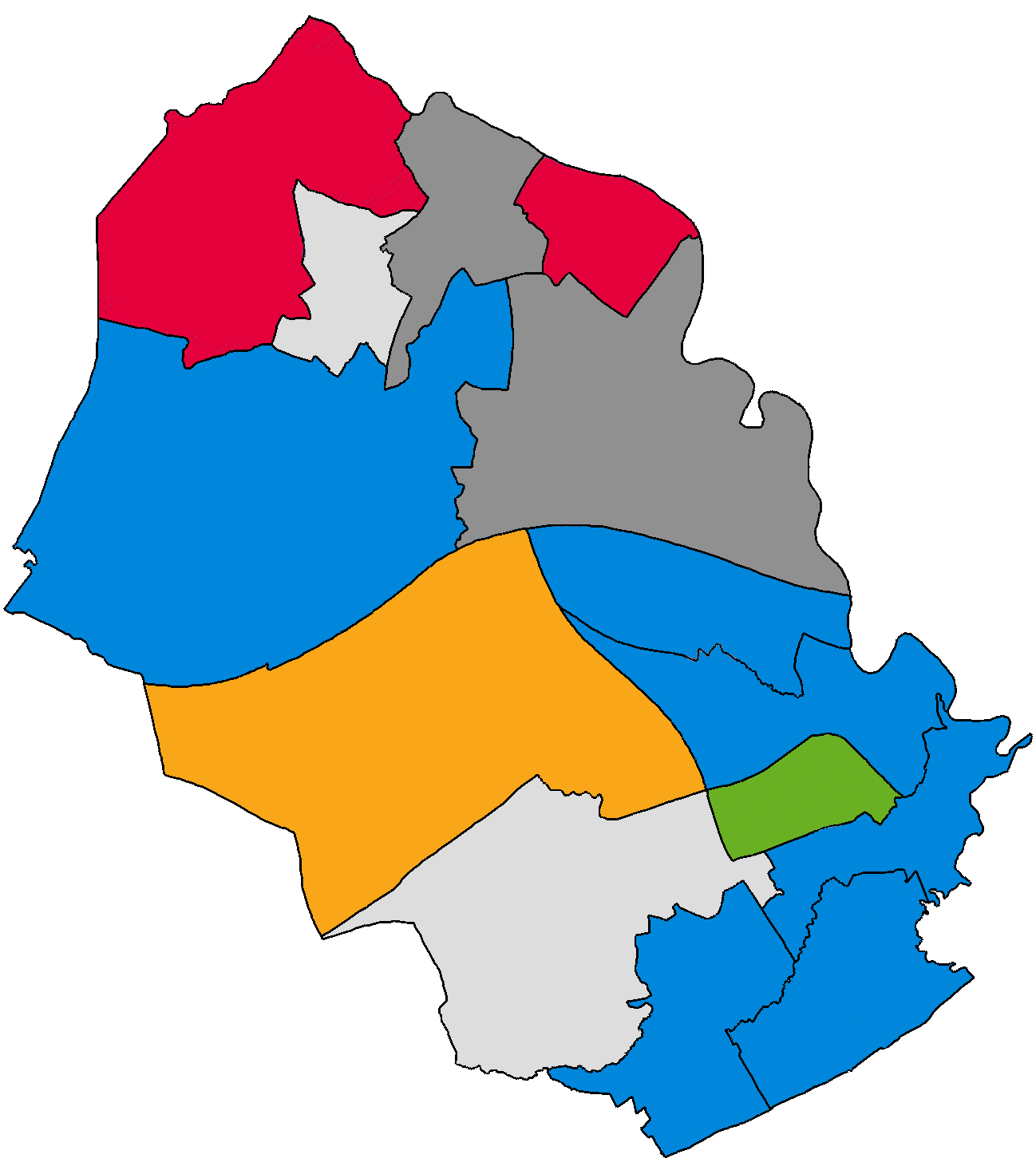
- A map presenting the results of the election, by party of the councillor elected from each ward.
Council control before election
Conservative
Council control after election
Conservative

The 2022 Runnymede Borough Council election took place on 5 May 2022 to elect one-third of members of the Runnymede Borough Council in England. This was on the same day as other local elections in the U.K.

Since its first election in 1973, the council has been under Conservative control, apart from a short period between 1996 and 1998 when it was under no overall control. In the previous election in 2021, the Conservative Party retained control of the council, winning 9 out of 13 seats and holding their majority, albeit reduced to 4. Liberal Democrat and Labour Co-op Party councillors, are also present on the council. Since that election, one Conservative councillor, Mike Kusneraitis, had defected to become an independent and was defending his seat.

Following the election, the majority Conservatives lost four seats and reducing their majority to Four, with Labour gaining two, Green Party of England and Wales gaining one, and independent candidate Andrea Berardi picking up his seat from the Conservatives also.

The election occurred in the national context of the Partygate scandal and the cost of living crisis.

== Results summary ==
Runnymede Borough Council Election 2022
| Party | This election | | | Full council | | | This election | | |
| Party | Seats | Net | Seats % | Other | Total | Total % | Votes | Votes % | +/− |
|---|---|---|---|---|---|---|---|---|---|
| Conservative | 6 | ▼4 | 42.8 | 18 | 24 | 58.5 | 7,198 | 37.9 | -6.6 |
| Liberal Democrats | 1 | Steady | 7.1 | 2 | 3 | 7.3 | 3,524 | 18.6 | +4.8 |
| Labour Co-op | 2 | ▲2 | 14.3 | 1 | 3 | 7.3 | 3,280 | 17.3 | +0.6 |
| Independent | 2 | ▲1 | 14.3 | 2 | 4 | 9.8 | 2,102 | 11.1 | =0.0 |
| RIRG | 2 | Steady | 14.3 | 4 | 6 | 14.6 | 1,624 | 8.5 | -0.6 |
| Green | 1 | ▲1 | 7.1 | 0 | 1 | 2.4 | 1,208 | 6.4 | +2.8 |
| Heritage | 0 | Steady | 0.0 | 0 | 0 | 0.0 | 61 | 0.3 | New |

== Ward results ==
=== Addlestone North ===
Addlestone North
| Party | Candidate | Votes | % | ±% |
|---|---|---|---|---|
| Green | Steve Ringham | 525 | 40.57 | +17.30 |
| Conservative | David Curran | 481 | 37.17 | −9.75 |
| Labour Co-op | Michael Scott | 186 | 14.37 | −4.47 |
| Liberal Democrats | Rudi Dikty-Daudiyan | 102 | 7.88 | −0.45 |
| Majority | | 44 | 3.4 | |
| Rejected ballots | | 6 | | |
| Turnout | | 1294 | | |
| Green gain from Independent | | Swing | +13.53 | |

=== Addlestone South ===
Addlestone South
| Party | Candidate | Votes | % | ±% |
|---|---|---|---|---|
| Conservative | Jonathan Wilson | 610 | 44.33 | −13.23 |
| Labour Co-op | Nigel Base | 339 | 24.64 | −2.20 |
| Liberal Democrats | Ray Williamson | 251 | 18.24 | +2.64 |
| Green | Andrew Smith | 176 | 12.79 | New |
| Majority | | 271 | 19.7 | |
| Rejected ballots | | 13 | | |
| Turnout | | 1376 | | |
| Conservative hold | | Swing | -5.52 | |

=== Chertsey Riverside ===
Chertsey Riverside
| Party | Candidate | Votes | % | ±% |
|---|---|---|---|---|
| Conservative | Shannon Saise-Marshall | 475 | 39.16 | −15.54 |
| Labour Co-op | Bernie Stacey | 333 | 27.45 | +4.18 |
| Liberal Democrats | Kevin Lee | 268 | 22.09 | +7.22 |
| Green | Richard Miller | 140 | 11.54 | New |
| Majority | | 142 | 11.7 | |
| Rejected ballots | | 14 | | |
| Turnout | | 1216 | | |
| Conservative hold | | Swing | -9.86 | |

=== Chertsey St. Ann's ===
Chertsey St. Ann's
| Party | Candidate | Votes | % | ±% |
|---|---|---|---|---|
| Conservative | Dolsie Clarke | 502 | 34.34 | −18.29 |
| Independent | Peter Waddell | 479 | 32.76 | New |
| Labour | Peter Kingham | 292 | 19.97 | +1.30 |
| Liberal Democrats | Annabel Jones | 191 | 13.06 | −1.26 |
| Majority | | 23 | 1.6 | |
| Rejected ballots | | 9 | | |
| Turnout | | 1464 | | |
| Conservative hold | | Swing | -25.53 | |

=== Egham Hythe ===
Egham Hythe
| Party | Candidate | Votes | % | ±% |
|---|---|---|---|---|
| Labour Co-op | James Rhys Davies | 827 | 57.75 | +16.87 |
| Conservative | Mark Adams | 605 | 42.25 | −0.35 |
| Majority | | 222 | 15.5 | |
| Rejected ballots | | 11 | | |
| Turnout | | 1432 | | |
| Labour Co-op gain from Conservative | | Swing | +8.61 | |

=== Egham Town ===
Egham Town
| Party | Candidate | Votes | % | ±% |
|---|---|---|---|---|
| RIRG | Sam Jenkins | 826 | 55.44 | +2.53 |
| Conservative | Hollie Bolitho | 278 | 18.66 | −2.81 |
| Labour Co-op | Jacqueline Teale | 224 | 15.03 | −5.45 |
| Green | Timothy Hayes | 91 | 6.11 | New |
| Liberal Democrats | Ian Heath | 71 | 4.77 | −0.37 |
| Majority | | 548 | 36.8 | |
| Rejected ballots | | 8 | | |
| Turnout | | 1490 | | |
| RIRG hold | | Swing | +2.67 | |

=== Englefield Green East ===
Englefield Green East
| Party | Candidate | Votes | % | ±% |
|---|---|---|---|---|
| Independent | Andrea Berardi | 368 | 45.89 | New |
| Conservative | Rania Elzeiny | 217 | 27.06 | −17.44 |
| Labour Co-op | Cai Parry | 159 | 19.83 | −2.23 |
| Liberal Democrats | Tom Jordan | 58 | 7.23 | −16.66 |
| Majority | | 151 | 18.8 | |
| Rejected ballots | | 2 | | |
| Turnout | | 802 | | |
| Independent gain from Conservative | | Swing | +31.67 | |

=== Englefield Green West ===
Englefield Green West
| Party | Candidate | Votes | % | ±% |
|---|---|---|---|---|
| Labour Co-op | Abby King | 403 | 36.84 | +15.80 |
| Conservative | Tanya Solomon | 383 | 35.01 | −12.64 |
| Independent | Michael Kusneraitis | 308 | 28.15 | N/A |
| Majority | | 20 | 1.8 | |
| Rejected ballots | | 4 | | |
| Turnout | | 1094 | | |
| Labour Co-op gain from Conservative | | Swing | +14.22 | |

=== Longcross, Lyne and Chertsey South ===
Longcross, Lyne and Chertsey South
| Party | Candidate | Votes | % | ±% |
|---|---|---|---|---|
| Liberal Democrats | Sylvia Whyte | 657 | 68.80 | +23.14 |
| Conservative | Neill Rubidge | 298 | 31.20 | −9.34 |
| Majority | | 359 | 37.6 | |
| Rejected ballots | | 9 | | |
| Turnout | | 955 | | |
| Liberal Democrats hold | | Swing | +16.24 | |

=== New Haw ===
New Haw
| Party | Candidate | Votes | % | ±% |
|---|---|---|---|---|
| Conservative | Vanda Cunningham | 661 | 48.11 | −8.28 |
| Liberal Democrats | Kevin DeCruz | 652 | 47.45 | +3.84 |
| Heritage | Gian Palermiti | 61 | 4.44 | New |
| Majority | | 9 | 0.7 | |
| Rejected ballots | | 4 | | |
| Turnout | | 1374 | | |
| Conservative hold | | Swing | -6.06 | |

=== Ottershaw ===
Ottershaw
| Party | Candidate | Votes | % | ±% |
|---|---|---|---|---|
| Independent | Malcolm Cressey | 947 | 55.58 | −2.92 |
| Conservative | Leo Davies | 428 | 25.12 | −10.41 |
| Labour | John Gurney | 190 | 11.15 | −2.01 |
| Liberal Democrats | Stuart Lawrence | 139 | 8.16 | +1.84 |
| Majority | | 519 | 30.5 | |
| Rejected ballots | | 6 | | |
| Turnout | | 1704 | | |
| Independent hold | | Swing | +3.75 | |

=== Thorpe ===
Thorpe
| Party | Candidate | Votes | % | ±% |
|---|---|---|---|---|
| RIRG | Linda Gillham | 798 | 53.09 | +2.06 |
| Conservative | Nick Wase-Rogers | 421 | 28.01 | −5.80 |
| Labour Co-op | Benjamin Niblett | 211 | 14.04 | +3.06 |
| Liberal Democrats | Cheryl Smith-Wright | 73 | 4.86 | +0.68 |
| Majority | | 377 | 25.1 | |
| Rejected ballots | | 5 | | |
| Turnout | | 1503 | | |
| RIRG hold | | Swing | +3.93 | |

=== Virginia Water ===
Virginia Water
| Party | Candidate | Votes | % | ±% |
|---|---|---|---|---|
| Conservative | Jonathan Hulley | 900 | 56.68 | +14.60 |
| Liberal Democrats | Karin Rowsell | 572 | 36.02 | +12.10 |
| Labour Co-op | Karen McKinley-Gunn | 116 | 7.26 | −2.35 |
| Majority | | 328 | 20.7 | |
| Rejected ballots | | 10 | | |
| Turnout | | 1588 | | |
| Conservative hold | | Swing | +1.25 | |

=== Woodham and Rowtown ===
Woodham and Rowtown
| Party | Candidate | Votes | % | ±% |
|---|---|---|---|---|
| Conservative | Max Darby | 939 | 55.07 | −4.46 |
| Liberal Democrats | Jennifer Coulon | 490 | 28.74 | +17.15 |
| Green | Peter Chiverton | 276 | 16.19 | New |
| Majority | | 449 | 26.3 | |
| Rejected ballots | | 8 | | |
| Turnout | | 1705 | | |
| Conservative hold | | Swing | -10.81 | |
